= List of alumni of St John's College, Cambridge =

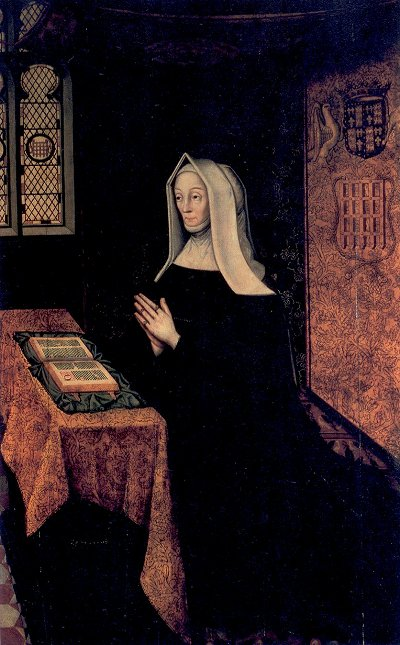
Portrait of Lady Margaret Beaufort, foundress

The following is a list of notable people educated at St John's College, Cambridge. When available, years of attendance are provided as indicated in the College Register or in the Oxford Dictionary of National Biography. Over 1000 former members of St John's College appear in the Oxford Dictionary of National Biography.

== Politics, military, and the civil service ==
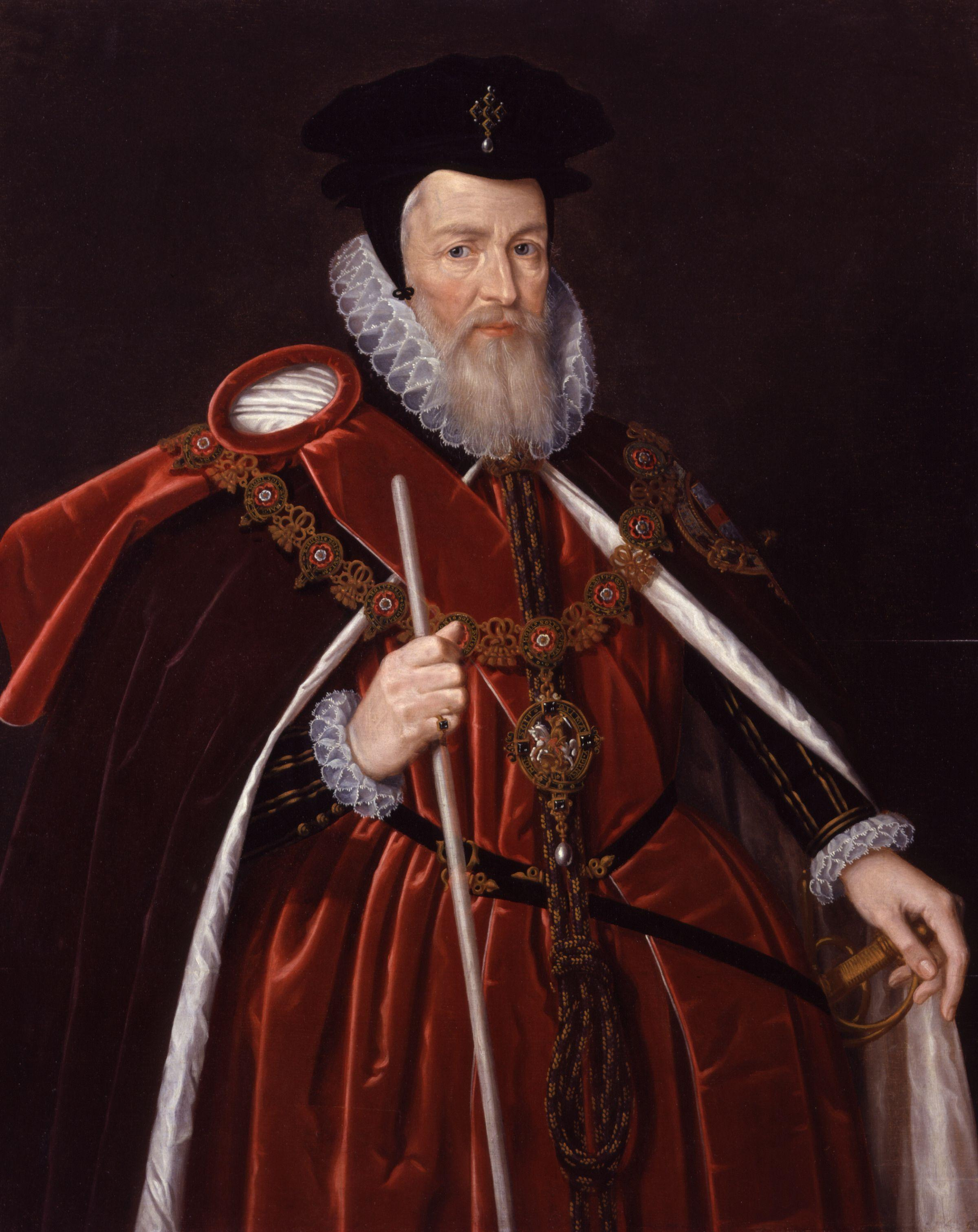
William Cecil

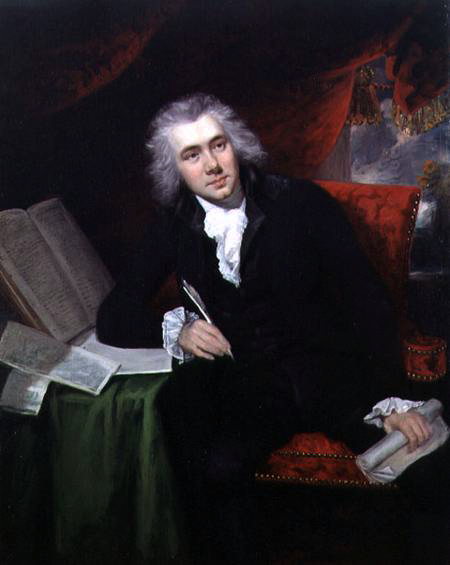
William Wilberforce

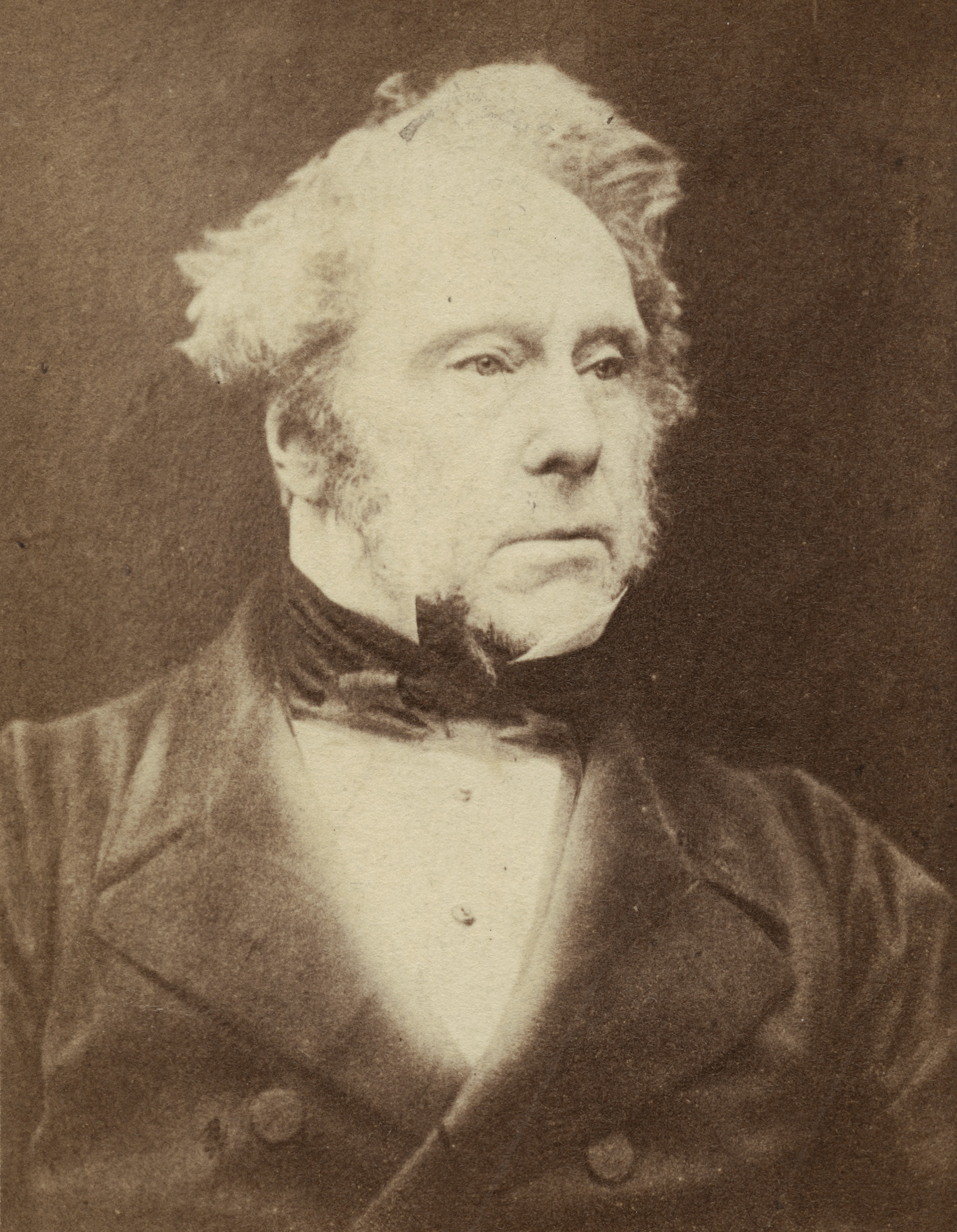
Lord Palmerston

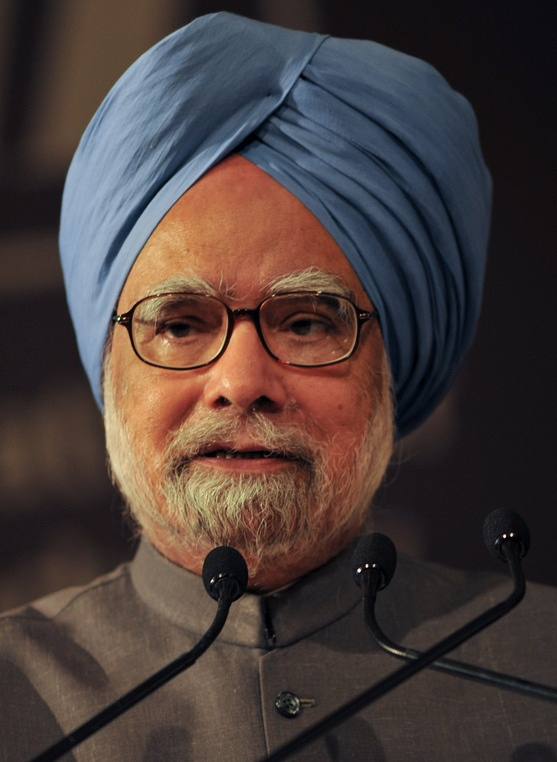
Manmohan Singh

=== United Kingdom ===
- John Aislabie, Chancellor of the Exchequer, 1718–21
- Prince Adolphus, Duke of Cambridge (honorary degree)
- Roger Ascham, tutor of Elizabeth I and advisor to Edward VI and Mary I
- Martin Bladen, Chief Secretary for Ireland, 1715–17
- Lucius Cary, 2nd Viscount Falkland, Secretary of State, 1642–43
- John Cheke, Secretary of State, 1553
- Thomas Clarkson, abolitionist and a leading campaigner against the slave trade in the British Empire
- John Duncombe, Chancellor of the Exchequer, 1672–76
- Gilbert Elliot-Murray-Kynynmound, 2nd Earl of Minto, Lord Privy Seal, 1846–52, First Lord of the Admiralty, 1835–1841
- Thomas de Grey, 2nd Earl de Grey, Lord Lieutenant of Ireland, 1841–44
- Sir Percy James Grigg, Secretary of State for War, 1942–45
- Henry Howard, 6th Duke of Norfolk, Earl Marshal, 1672–84
- Sir William Molesworth, 8th Baronet, Secretary of State for the Colonies, 1855
- Alfred Mond, 1st Baron Melchett, Minister of Health, 1921–22, Founder & Chairman of Imperial Chemical Industries
- Francis North, 1st Baron Guilford, Lord Keeper, 1682–85
- Fletcher Norton, 1st Baron Grantley, Speaker of the House of Commons, 1770–80
- Matthew Prior, Chief Secretary for Ireland, 1697–99, poet, ambassador & secret agent who negotiated the Treaty of Utrecht
- Hugh Percy, 3rd Duke of Northumberland, Lord Lieutenant of Ireland, 1829–30, Chancellor of the University of Cambridge 1840–47
- Dudley Ryder, 1st Earl of Harrowby, Secretary of State for Foreign Affairs, 1804-5
- Richard Ryder, Home Secretary, 1809–12
- Walter Montagu Douglas Scott, 5th Duke of Buccleuch, Lord Privy Seal, 1842–46
- Robert Stewart, Viscount Castlereagh, Secretary of State for Foreign Affairs, 1812–22
- Sarah Teather, Minister of State for Children and Families, 2010–12
- Thomas Thynne, 1st Marquess of Bath, Secretary of State, 1768–70 & 1775–79 (South), 1768 & 1779 (North)
- Richard Trench, 2nd Earl of Clancarty, British Ambassador to the Netherlands, 1813–23, President of the Board of Trade, 1812–18
- James Vernon, Secretary of State 1697–1700 (North) and 1700–02 (South)
- Edward Villiers, 1st Earl of Jersey, Secretary of State 1699–1700 (South)
- George Villiers, 4th Earl of Clarendon, Secretary of State for Foreign Affairs, 1853–58, 1865–66, 1868–70
- Thomas Wentworth, 1st Earl of Strafford, leading advisor to Charles I, Lord Lieutenant of Ireland, 1633–41
- William Wilberforce, Member of Parliament and a leader of the movement to abolish the slave trade
- Fred Willey, Minister of State for Housing and Local Government, 1964–70
- William, Prince of Wales (affiliated)
- Charles Philip Yorke, Home Secretary, 1803–04, First Lord of the Admiralty, 1810–12

==== Current Members of Parliament ====
- Richard Burgon
- Robert Jenrick, Minister of State for Immigration, 2022–present
- Hamish Falconer
- Josh Simons

==== Current Members of the House of Lords ====
- John Browne
- Charles Courtenay, 19th Earl of Devon
- Nigel Crisp
- Nigel Dodds
- Peter Hennessy
- David Hope
- Mervyn King
- Colin Renfrew
- Larry Whitty

==== Lord High Treasurers ====
- Robert Cecil, 1st Earl of Salisbury, Lord High Treasurer, 1608–12
- William Cecil, 1st Baron Burghley, Lord High Treasurer, 1572–98
- Thomas Howard, 1st Earl of Suffolk, Lord High Treasurer, 1614–18
- Thomas Sackville, 1st Earl of Dorset, Lord High Treasurer, 1599–1608
- Thomas Wriothesley, 4th Earl of Southampton, Lord High Treasurer, 1660–67

==== Prime Ministers ====
- George Hamilton-Gordon, 4th Earl of Aberdeen, Prime Minister of the United Kingdom, 1852–55
- F. J. Robinson, 1st Viscount Goderich, Prime Minister of the United Kingdom, 1827–28
- Henry John Temple, 3rd Viscount Palmerston, Prime Minister of the United Kingdom, 1855–58 & 1859–65
- Charles Watson-Wentworth, 2nd Marquess of Rockingham (briefly admitted), Prime Minister of Great Britain, 1765–66 & 1782

==== Colonial Administrators and Diplomats ====
- Sir Thomas Bendish, 2nd Baronet, British Ambassador to the Ottoman Empire, 1647–55
- Henry Brind, British Ambassador to Somalia, 1977–80, High Commissioner to Malawi, 1983–87
- Sir Bryan Cartledge, British Ambassador to the USSR, 1985–88
- Peter Collecott, British Ambassador to Brazil, 2004–08
- Walter Coutts, Governor of Uganda, 1961–63
- John Cradock, 1st Baron Howden, Governor of the Cape Colony, 1811–14
- Sir Percy Cradock, British Ambassador to the People's Republic of China, 1978–83
- Alleyne FitzHerbert, 1st Baron St Helens, British ambassador to Russia, 1783–87 & 1801–02
- Hugh Foot, Baron Caradon, Governor of Cyprus, 1957–60, British Permanent Representative to the United Nations, 1964–70
- Harry Edward Spiller Cordeaux, Governor of Saint Helena, 1912–20, and Governor of Uganda, 1910–11
- Thomas Gibson-Carmichael, 1st Baron Carmichael, Governor of Victoria, 1908–11
- Christopher Ingham, British Ambassador to Uzbekistan, 1999-2002
- Edward Law, 1st Earl of Ellenborough, Governor-General of India, 1842–44
- John Margetson, British Ambassador to Vietnam, 1978–80, Ambassador to the Netherlands 1984–88
- Sir Robin McLaren, British Ambassador to the People's Republic of China, 1991–94
- James Broom Millar – first Director General of the Ghana Broadcasting Corporation (1954–1960)
- Sir James Peiris, Governor of Ceylon, 1929
- Richard Penn, Lieutenant Governor of Pennsylvania, 1771–73
- Sir Richard Posnett, Governor of Belize, 1972–76, Governor of Bermuda 1981–83
- Sir Andrew Ridgway, Lieutenant Governor of Jersey, 2006–11
- John Vernon Rob, 1st British High Commissioner to Singapore, 1965–67
- Sir Fraser Russell, Governor of Southern Rhodesia, 1934–35, 1942, and 1946
- Sir Philip Thomas, British High Commissioner to Nigeria, 2001–04, Consul-General in New York, 2004–07

==== Military ====
- William Cavendish, 1st Duke of Newcastle, General and major supporter of Charles I in the English Civil War
- Thomas Fairfax, 3rd Lord Fairfax of Cameron, General and parliamentary commander-in-chief in the English Civil War
- Wilmot Fawkes, Admiral
- Sir Roger Palin, Air Chief Marshal
- Algernon Percy, 4th Duke of Northumberland, Admiral, First Lord of the Admiralty, 1852
- Algernon Percy, 10th Earl of Northumberland, Admiral of the Fleet, Lord High Admiral, 1638–43
- Hugh Percy, 2nd Duke of Northumberland, General during the American Revolutionary War
- Edmund Phipps, General
- Hugh Rose, 1st Baron Strathnairn, Field Marshal
- Edward Russell, 1st Earl of Orford, Admiral of the Fleet, First Lord of the Admiralty, 1694–99, 1709–10, and 1714–17
- Sir Thomas Snow, Lieutenant-General during WWI
- George Townshend, 1st Marquess Townshend, Field Marshal, Lord Lieutenant of Ireland, 1767–72

=== International ===
- Morris Alexander, South African member of parliament
- Sir James Allen, Minister of Finance (New Zealand), 1912–15
- Fra' Matthew Festing, Prince and Grand Master of the Sovereign Military Order of Malta, 2008–17
- Yoshirō Fujimura, 2nd Baron Fujimura, Minister of Communications (Japan), 1924, Director of Mitsui & Co.
- Akhter Husain, Governor of West Pakistan, 1957–60
- Abul Hassan Isphani, Ambassador to the United States (Pakistan), 1948–52
- Kenchō Suematsu, 1st Viscount Suematsu, Minister of Home Affairs (Japan), 1900–01, Minister of Communications, 1898
- Nawab Mohammad Ismail Khan, President of the All-India Muslim League, 1930–47
- Geoffrey Onyeama, Minister of Foreign Affairs (Nigeria), 2015–present
- Sir R. P. Paranjpye, High Commissioner to Australia (India), 1944–47
- Lim Chuan Poh, Chief of Defence Force (Singapore), 2000–03
- Sir Henry Lee Hau Shik, Finance Minister of Malaysia, 1957–59
- Makoto Taniguchi, Permanent Representative of Japan to the United Nations, 1986–89, Chairman of UNICEF, 1988
- Edward Ronald Walker, Permanent Representative of Australia to the United Nations, 1956–59
- Princess Theodora of Liechtenstein, environmentalist and founder of Green Teen Team Foundation, 2022–2025

==== Prime Ministers ====
- Sir Francis Bell, Prime Minister of New Zealand, 1925
- Alfred Domett, Prime Minister of New Zealand, 1862–63
- Manmohan Singh, Prime Minister of India, 2004–2014

== Justice ==
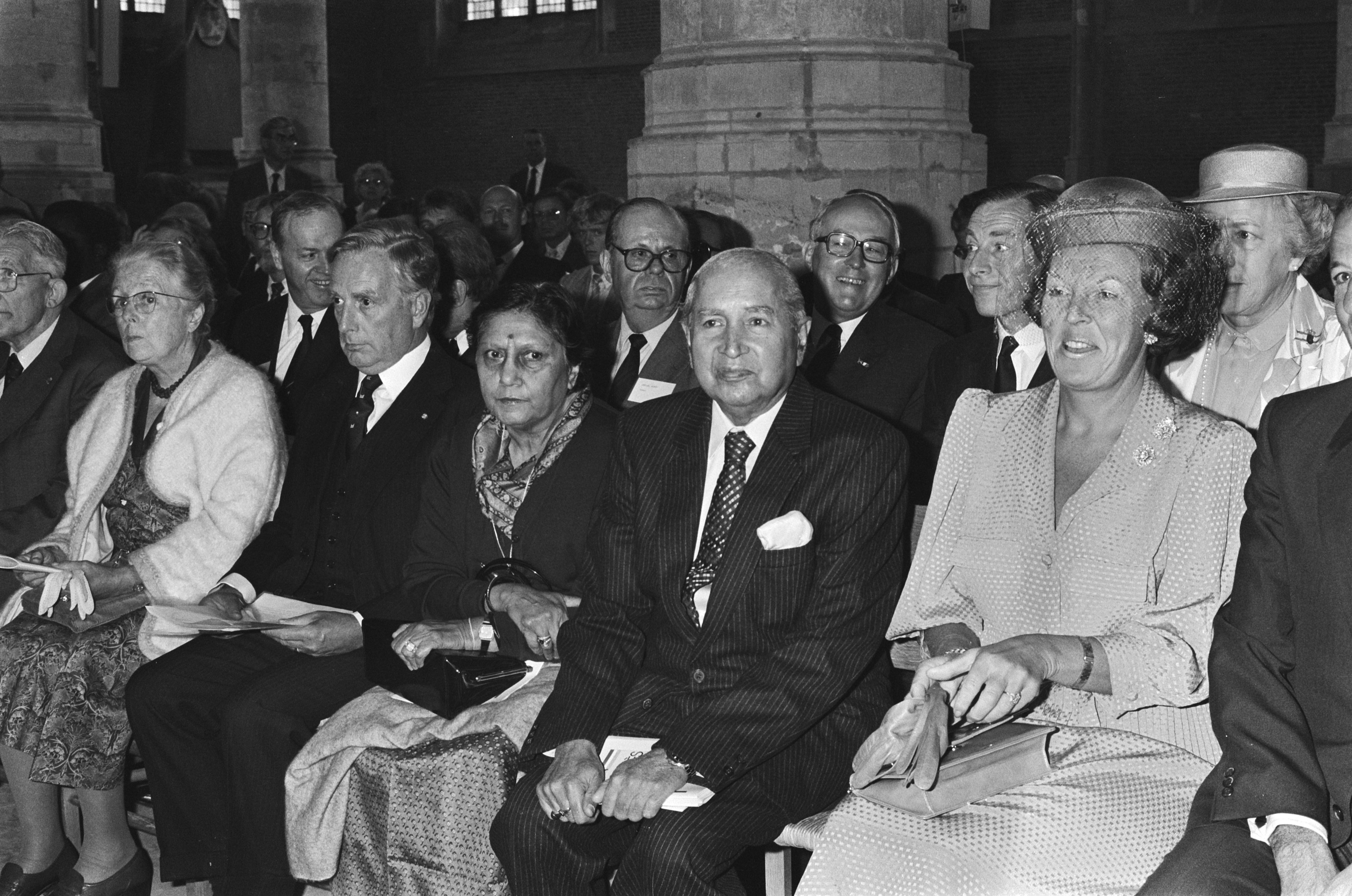
Nagendra Singh

- Edmund Anderson, Chief Justice of the Common Pleas, 1583–1605
- Stanley Berwin, one of the leading lawyers of the second half of the 20th century
- Robert Booth, Lord Chief Justice of Ireland, 1679–80
- Sir Codrington Edmund Carrington, 1st Chief Justice of Ceylon, 1801–06
- E. C. Clark, Regius Professor of Civil Law, 1854–58
- Thomas Denman, 1st Baron Denman, Lord Chief Justice of England, 1832–50
- Asaf Ali Asghar Fyzee (1899–1981), advocate in Bombay High Court, 1st Indian ambassador to Egypt
- Edward Marshall Hall, Victorian era barrister known as "The Great Defender"
- Robert Heath, Lord Chief Justice of England, 1642–45
- Ahmad Mohamed Ibrahim, 1st Attorney-General of Singapore, 1965–67
- Donald Kingdon, Chief Justice of Nigeria, 1929–46
- William Martin, Chief Justice of New Zealand, 1841–57
- G. M. Paterson, Attorney General of Ghana, 1956–57
- Maharaj Nagendra Singh, President of the International Court of Justice, 1985–88
- John Smalman Smith, Chief Justice of Lagos (Nigeria), 1889–95
- Wee Chong Jin, Chief Justice of Singapore, 1963–90
- Glanville Williams, described in 1997 by The New York Times as the greatest lawyer of the 20th century
- Humphrey Winch, Lord Chief Justice of Ireland, 1608–11
- Walter Woon, Attorney-General of Singapore, 2008–10

== Science, mathematics, and technology ==
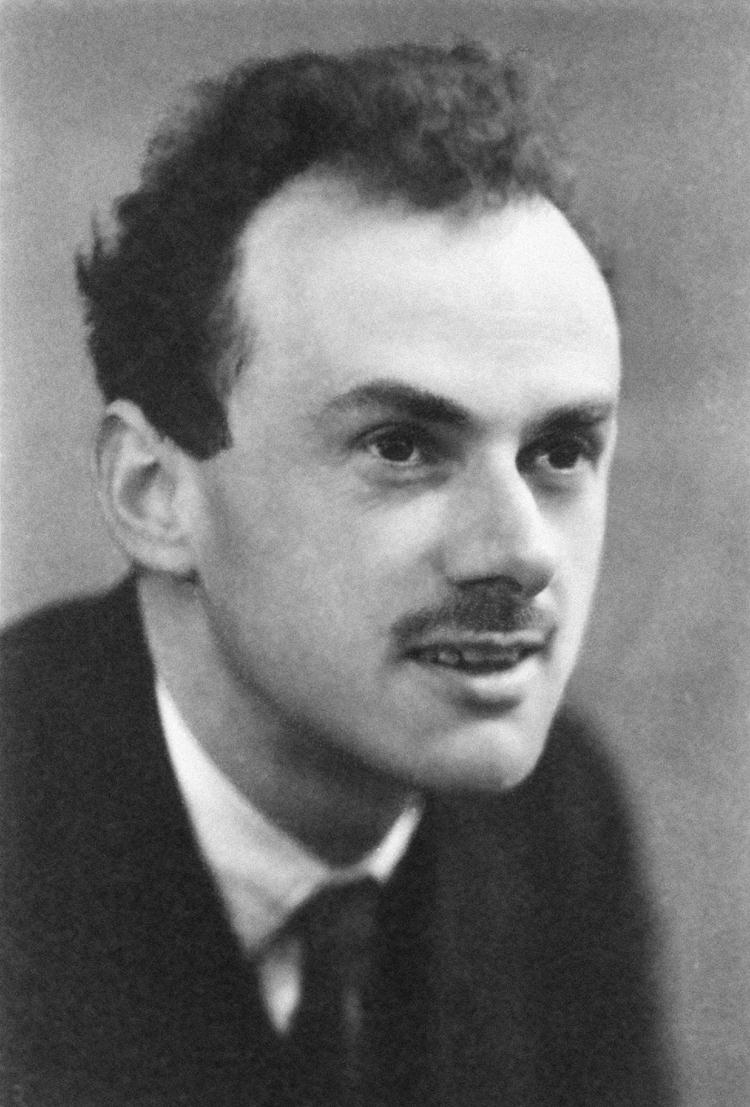
Paul Dirac

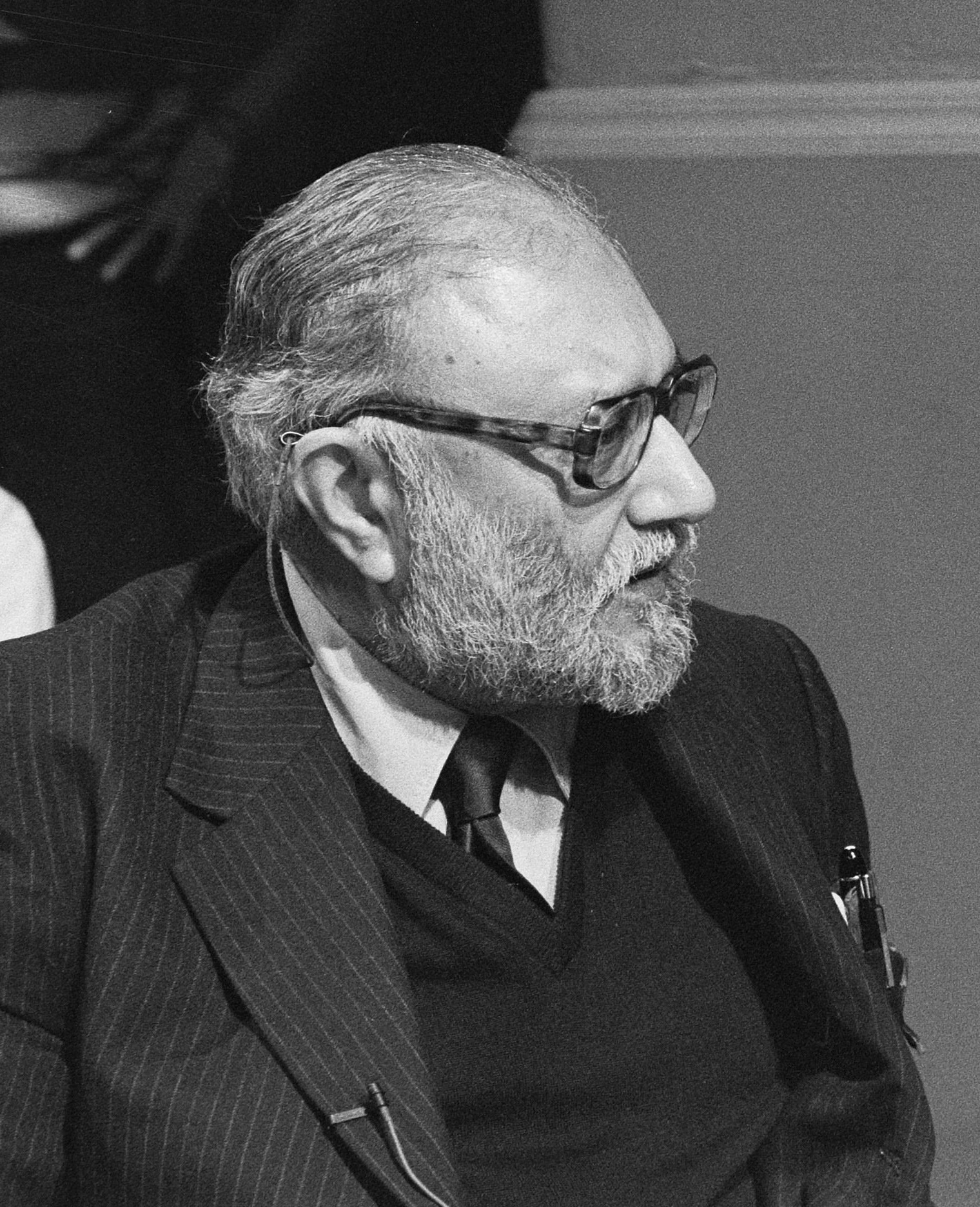
Abdus Salam

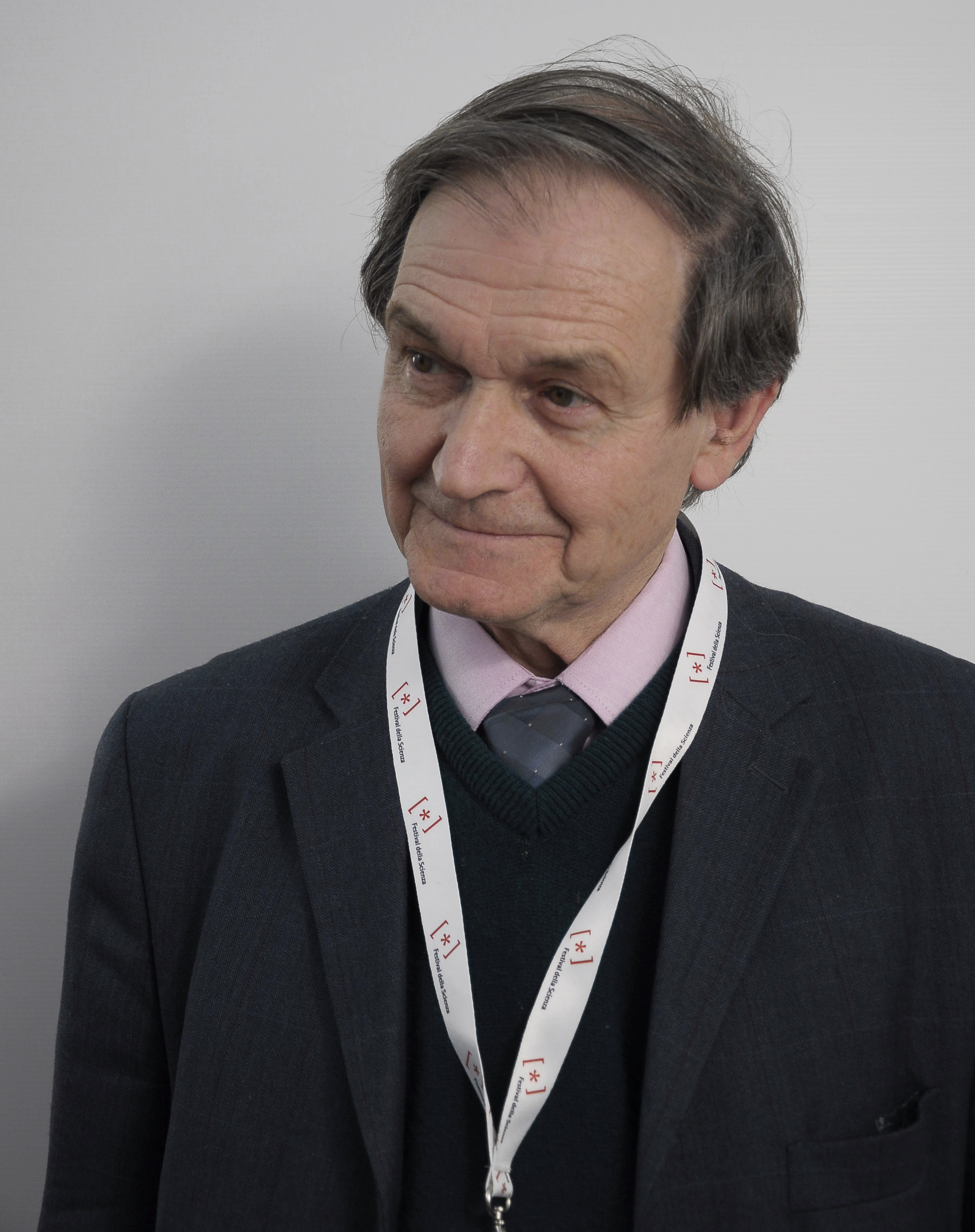
Roger Penrose

- Bernard Armitage, fellow of the College and psychiatrist
- George Barnard, statistician known for his work on the foundations of statistics
- Frederic Bartlett, psychologist
- William Bateson, biologist
- Frank H. Berkshire, Principal Teaching Fellow in Fluid Dynamics at Imperial College London
- Jagdish Bhagwati, economist
- Henry Briggs, mathematician
- William Burnside, mathematician
- Gladwin Albert Hurst Buttle, pharmacologist
- Sir David Cox, prominent statistician
- Sir Samuel Curran, physicist, inventor of the scintillation counter and proportional counter, and founder of Strathclyde University
- George Darwin, astronomer
- John Dee, mathematician, astronomer, astrologer, geographer, and consultant to Queen Elizabeth I
- Eric Denton, marine biologist
- Fearon Fallows, astronomer
- Thomas Fink, physicist and author
- John Ambrose Fleming, electrical engineer
- Steve Furber, computer scientist
- William Gilbert, physician and natural philosopher, discoverer of the Earth's magnetic field and inventor of the word 'electricity'
- Johannes de Villiers Graaff, economist
- William Gregor, discoverer of titanium
- William D. Hamilton, evolutionary biologist who formalised the concept of kin selection
- Douglas Hartree, mathematician
- David Harvey, Marxist geographer, social scientist
- William Heberden, British physician, gave the first clinical description (1768) of angina pectoris and demonstrated that chicken pox was different from smallpox
- John Herschel, prominent mathematician and astronomer who coined the word "photography"
- W. E. Hick, pioneer of cognitive science and discoverer of Hick's law
- Robert Hinde, Professor of Zoology, and former Master of St. John's
- Cyril Benoni Holman Hunt, entomologist and agriculturist
- William George Horner, mathematician
- Sir Fred Hoyle, pioneering but controversial cosmologist who first used the term 'Big Bang'
- James Jago, scientist and physician
- Sir Harold Jeffreys, applied mathematician and geophysicist
- Joseph Larmor, mathematician and physicist
- Louis Leakey, archaeologist and naturalist credited with the discovery of Homo habilis
- John Marrack, immunologist
- Alfred Marshall, economist
- William McDougall, psychologist
- James McKeen Cattell, psychologist
- Louis J. Mordell, mathematician
- Seymour Papert, computer scientist
- Sir Charles Algernon Parsons, inventor of the steam turbine
- Rudolf Peierls, physicist
- Sir Roger Penrose, mathematical physicist and philosopher
- Cedric Price, architect
- Richard A. Proctor, astronomer
- Oswald Longstaff Prowde, civil engineer
- Richard Samworth, statistician
- Vikram Sarabhai, father of the Indian space programme
- Edmund Sharpe, architect
- David Stoddart, biogeographer
- James Joseph Sylvester, mathematician
- Brook Taylor, mathematician
- William West Jr, botanist
- George Stephen West, Hutchinson research student, botanist
- Sir Maurice Wilkes, one of the founding fathers of modern computer science, and inventor of the first stored program digital computer
- John Tuzo Wilson, geophysicist and geologist who achieved worldwide acclaim for his contributions to the theory of plate tectonics
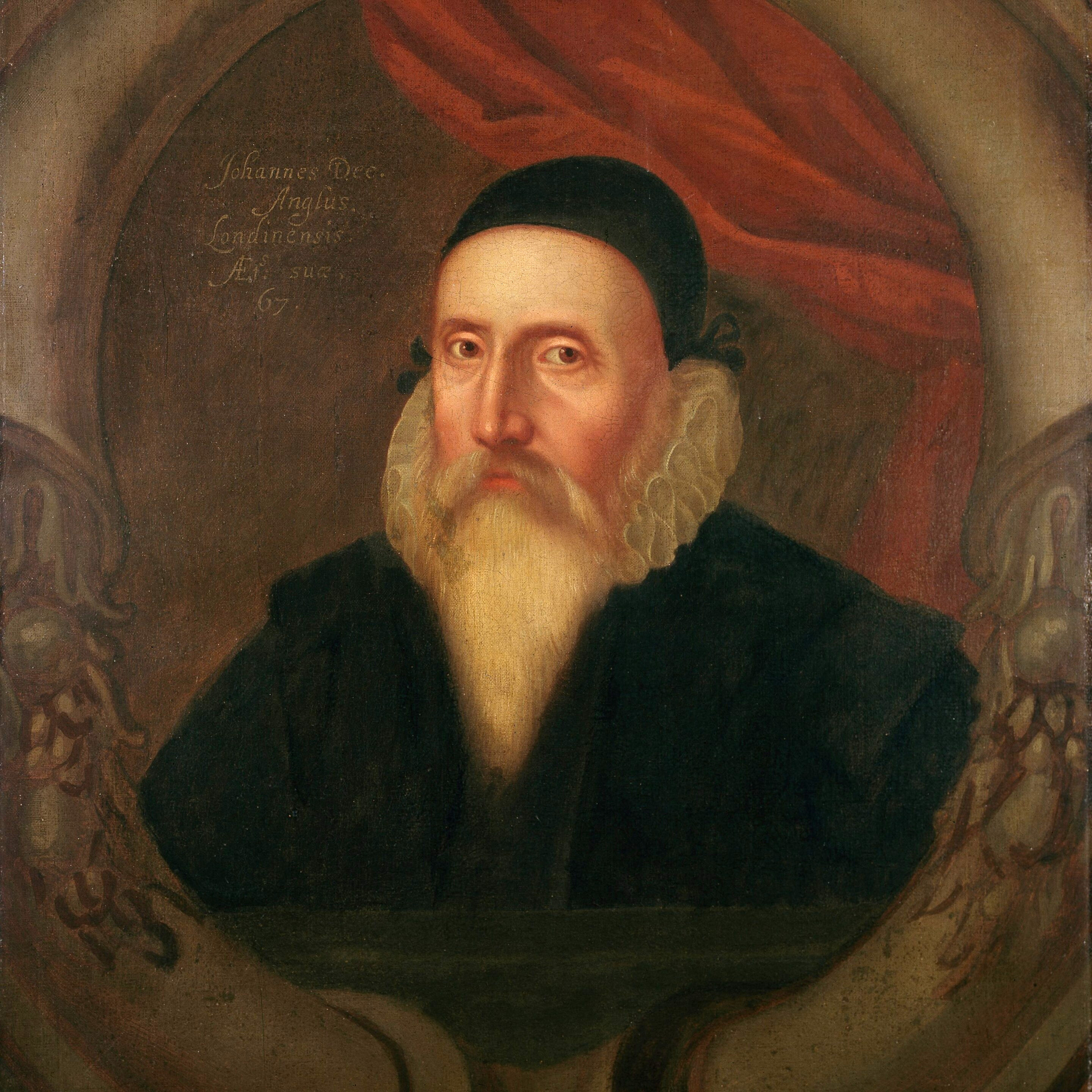
John Dee

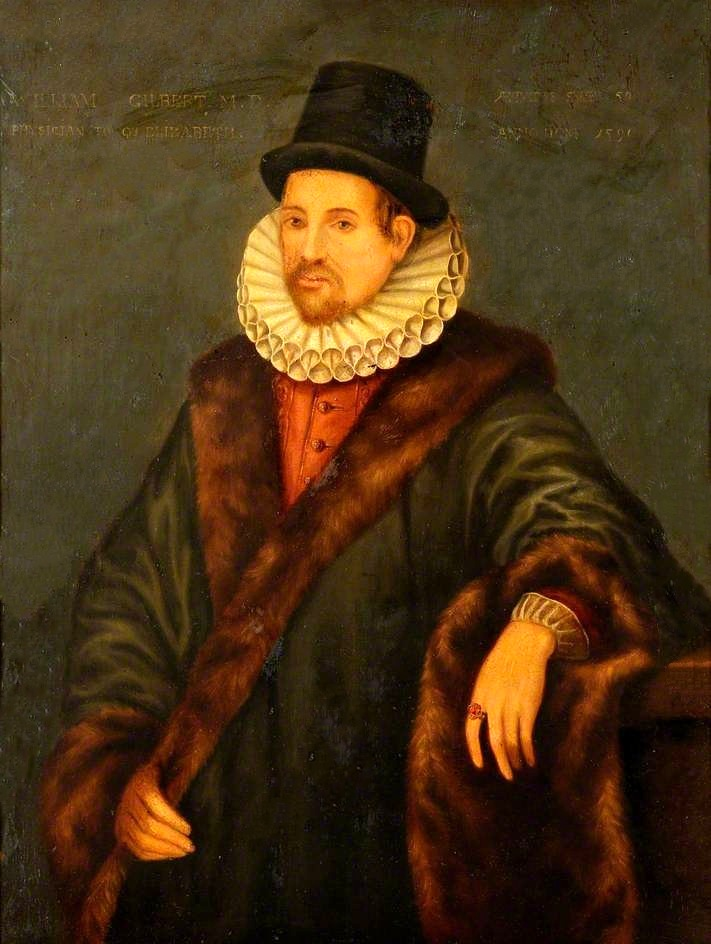
William Gilbert

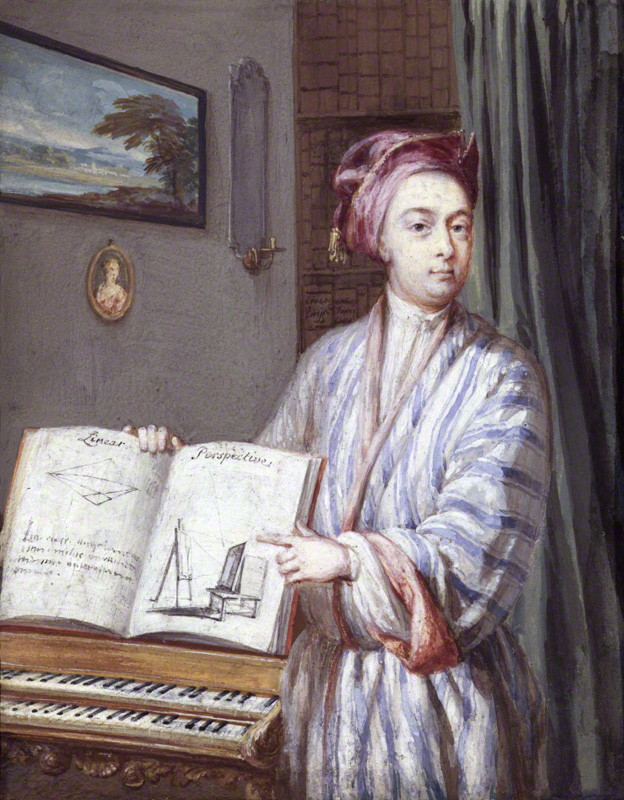
Brook Taylor

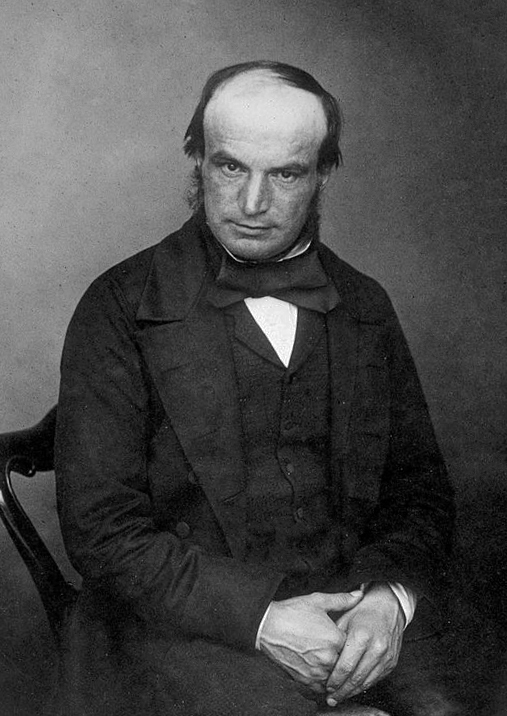
John Couch Adams

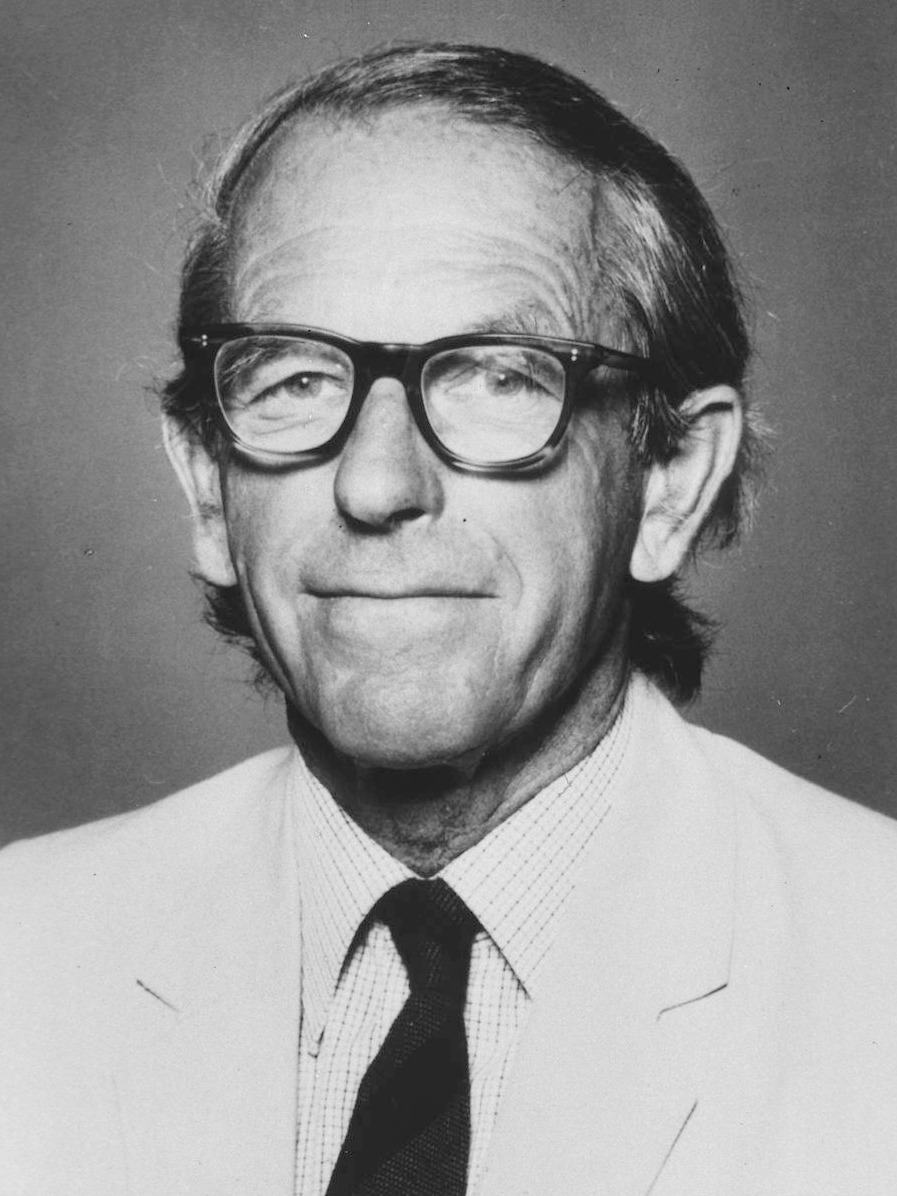
Frederick Sanger, the fourth person to win two Nobel Prizes

=== Nobel Prize winners ===
- Sir Edward Appleton, winner of the Nobel prize for Physics, for discovering the Appleton layer
- Max Born (affiliated), Nobel laureate in Physics
- Sir John Cockcroft, Nobel prize-winning physicist who first split the atom
- Allan Cormack, Nobel laureate in Medicine or Physiology for the invention of the CAT scan
- Paul Dirac, Nobel laureate in Physics and one of the founders of Quantum Mechanics
- Sir Nevill Francis Mott, awarded Nobel prize for Physics for work on the behaviour of electrons in magnetic solids
- Abdus Salam, Nobel laureate in Physics, for unifying the electromagnetic force and the weak force
- Frederick Sanger, molecular biologist and one of only four double Nobel Prize winners
- Maurice Wilkins, awarded Nobel prize for Medicine or Physiology with Watson and Crick for discovering the structure of DNA
- Eric Maskin, Prize in Economic Sciences in Memory of Alfred Nobel, "for having laid the foundations of mechanism design theory"
- Roger Penrose, Nobel Prize in Physics, "for the discovery that black hole formation is a robust prediction of the general theory of relativity"

=== Royal Medal winners ===
Three Royal Medals, known also as the Queen's Medals, are awarded annually by the Sovereign upon the recommendation of the Council of the Royal Society, "two for the most important contributions to the advancement of Natural Knowledge (one in the physical and one in the biological sciences) and the other for distinguished contributions in the applied sciences". The first Royal Medal was awarded in 1826 and previous recipients include thirty-eight Johnians.

Name	Year	Rationale
John Herschel	1836	For his paper on nebulae and clusters of stars, published in the Philosophical Transactions for 1833
James Sylvester	1861	For his various memoirs and researches in mathematical science
John Newport Langley	1892	For his work on secreting glands, and on the nervous system
Charles Pritchard	1892	For his work on photometry and stellar parallax
Arthur Schuster	1893	For his spectroscopic inquiries, and his researches on disruptive discharge through gases and on terrestrial magnetism
Percy MacMahon	1900	For the number and range of his contributions to mathematical science
William Burnside	1904	For his researches in mathematics, particularly in the theory of groups
Augustus Love	1909	On the ground of his researches in the theory of elasticity and cognate subjects
William Mitchinson Hicks	1912	On the ground of his researches in mathematical physics
Grafton Elliot Smith	1912	No citation.
William Johnson Sollas	1914	For researches in palaeontology
Joseph Larmor	1915	On the ground of his numerous and important contributions to mathematical and physical science
William Rivers	1915	On the ground of his important contributions to ethnography and ethnology
William Bateson	1920	On the ground of his contributions to biological science, and especially his studies in genetics
Frederick Blackman	1921	For his researches on the gaseous exchange in plants & on the operation of limiting factors
Albert Seward	1925	For his researches on the palaeobotany of Gondwanaland
John Edward Marr	1930	For his pioneer work in the accurate zoning of the palaeozoic rocks
Patrick Laidlaw	1933	For his work on diseases due to viruses, including that on the cause and prevention of distemper in dogs.
Alfred Harker	1935	In recognition of his distinguished work and influence as a petrologist
Paul Dirac	1939	For the leading part he had taken in the development of the new quantum mechanics
William Topley	1942	For his outstanding work on experimental epidemiology and immunology
Harold Jeffreys	1948	For his distinguished work in geophysics and his important contributions to the astronomy of the Solar System
Edward Appleton	1950	For his work on the ele [sic] transmission of electromagnetic waves round the earth and for his investigations of the ionic state of the upper atmosphere
Frederic Bartlett	1952	In recognition of his creation of an experimental school of psychology which has established under his leadership an outstanding position recognised internationally as without superior
Nevill Mott	1953	In recognition of his eminent work in the field of quantum theory and particularly in the theory of metals
John Cockcroft	1954	In recognition of his distinguished work on nuclear and atomic physics
W. V. D. Hodge	1957	In recognition of his distinguished work on algebraic geometry
Rudolf Peierls	1959	In recognition of his distinguished work on the theoretical foundations of high energy and nuclear physics
Raymond Lyttleton	1965	In recognition of his distinguished contributions to astronomy, particularly for his work on the dynamical stability of galaxies
Frank Yates	1966	In recognition of his profound and far-reaching contributions to the statistical methods of experimental biology
Joseph Hutchinson	1967	In recognition of his distinguished work on the genetics and evolution of crop-plants with particular reference to cotton
Charles Oatley	1969	In recognition of his distinguished work in the wartime development of radar and latterly for the design and development of a highly successful scanning electron microscope
Frederick Sanger	1969	In recognition of his pioneer work on the sequence of amino acids in proteins and of nucleotides of ribonucleic acids
Fred Hoyle	1974	In recognition of his distinguished contributions to theoretical physics and cosmology
Abdus Salam	1978	In recognition of his outstanding contributions to the physics of elementary particles with special reference to the unification of the electromagnetic and weak interactions
Roger Penrose	1985	For his fundamental contributions to the theory of gravitational collapse and to other geometric aspects of theoretical physics
Eric Denton	1987	In recognition of his outstanding contributions to the physiology of marine animals, to marine biology generally, and his leadership of UK marine science
Robert Hinde	1996	In recognition of his contributions to the field of animal behaviour and the dominant influence it achieved on the emerging field of ethology
Christopher Dobson	2009	For his outstanding contributions to the understanding of the mechanisms of protein folding and mis-folding, and the implications for disease

== Arts, sports and literature ==
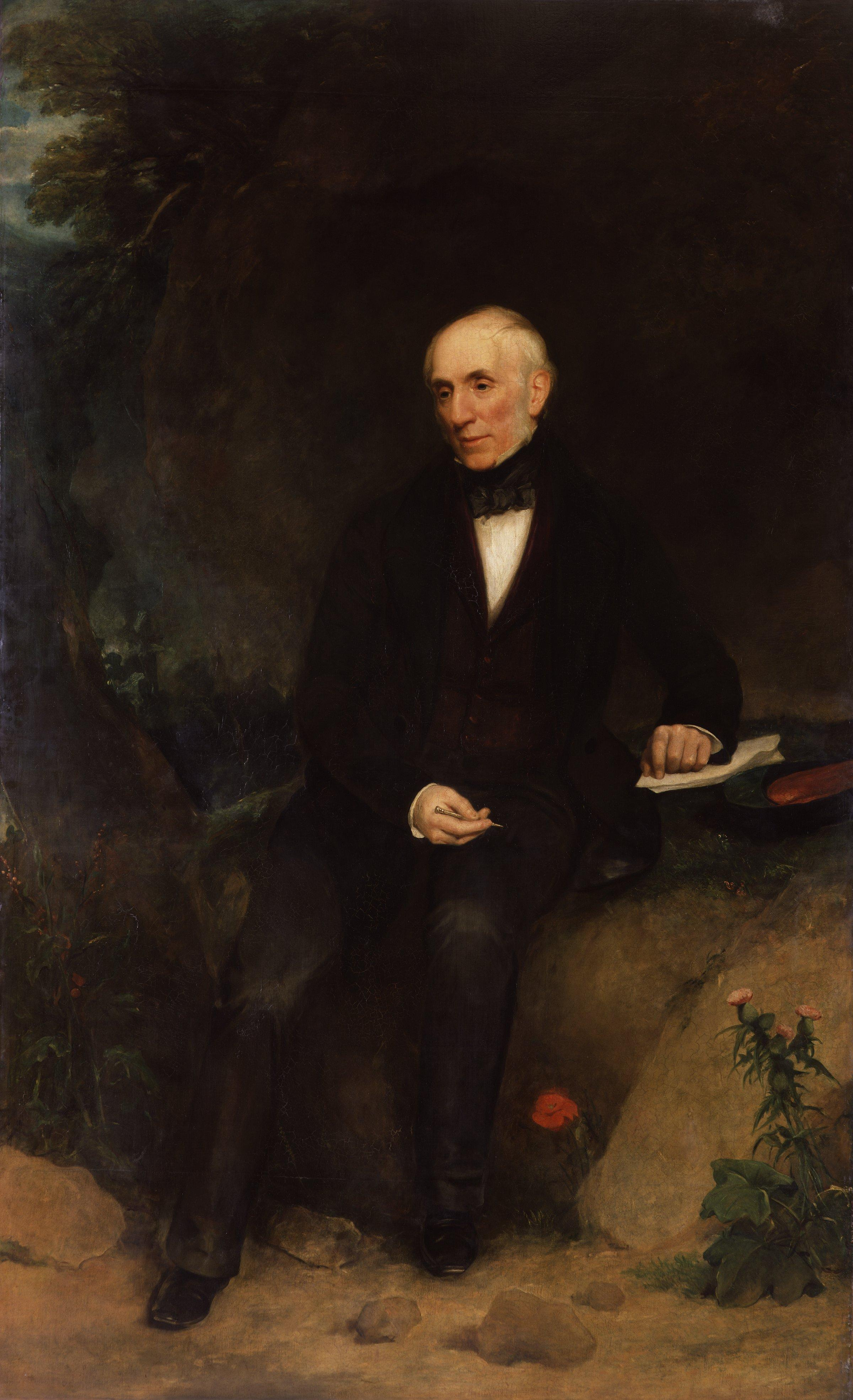
William Wordsworth

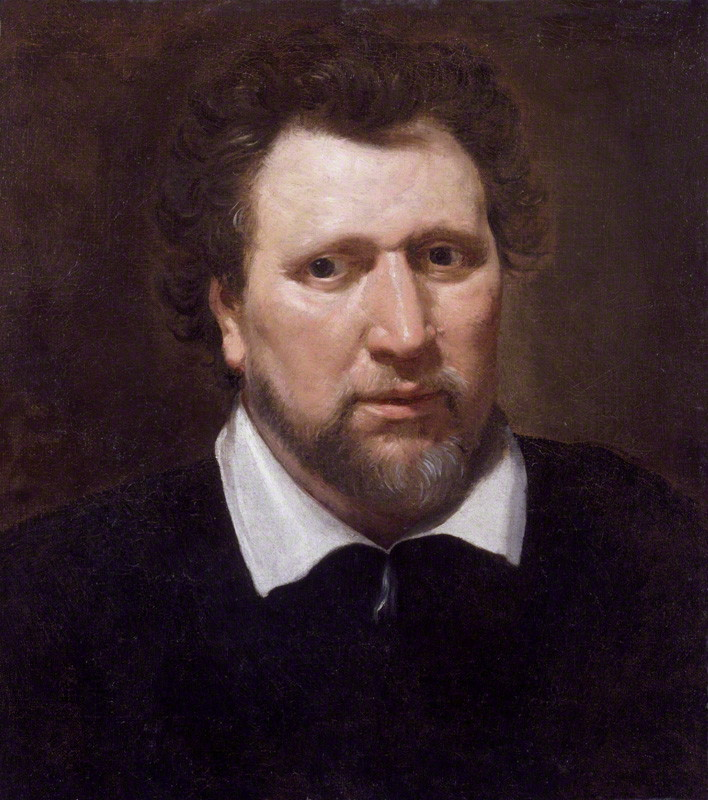
Ben Jonson

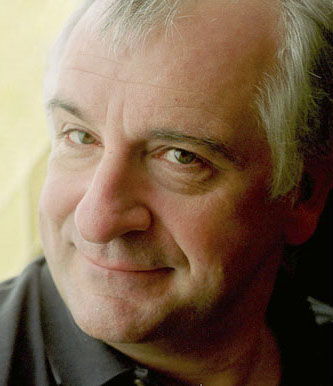
Douglas Adams

- Douglas Adams, author
- Donald Alexander, documentary film director
- Rob Andrew, England rugby footballer
- John Andrews, crime and antiques writer
- Jamie Bamber, actor
- Sir Cecil Beaton, renowned photographer, Academy Award winner, and one of the Bright Young Things
- Rodney Bennett, television director
- Chris Brasher, Olympic gold medallist runner, founder of the London Marathon
- Mike Brearley, cricketer, England Captain
- Patrick Brontë, father of the Brontë sisters
- Samuel Butler, author
- Sir Hugh Casson, president of the Royal Academy of Arts, 1974–84
- Sir John Clements, actor and theatrical producer
- Noah Charney, author, professor, presenter
- Emma Corrin, actress
- Jin Yong, Chinese novelist and newspaper editor
- Paul Dempsey, TV presenter
- Hugh Dennis, actor, comedian
- Jimmy Edwards, comedy actor
- Jennifer Egan, author, winner of 2011 Pulitzer Prize for fiction
- James Ogilvie Fairlie, Scottish landowner, known as the 'Father of the Open Championship'
- John Gardner, author
- Andrew Gilligan, controversial journalist
- Jonny Gray, army officer and sports executive.
- Robert Greene, arguably the first professional English author of plays, poems and novels
- Tony Hendra, actor, comedian
- Sir Derek Jacobi, actor
- Logie Bruce Lockhart, Scotland rugby footballer
- Ben Macintyre, author and journalist
- Jonathan Miller, physician, theatre and opera director, television presenter
- Thomas Nashe, pamphleteer, satirist and playwright
- Frederic Raphael, screenwriter, novelist and journalist, received Academy Award for Best Original Screenplay, 1965
- Piers Paul Read, novelist and historian
- Paul Ritter, actor
- Bob Roberts, Olympic athlete
- Angus Scott, Olympian
- Sir C. Aubrey Smith, cricket player and prominent 1930s Hollywood actor
- Tom Rob Smith, award nominee author of Soviet-era novels; erstwhile writer for Channel 5's defunct soap opera Family Affairs
- Robert Stevenson, nominated for Academy Award for Best Director, 1964
- Paul Sussman, author, archaeologist and journalist
- James St Clair Wade, Architect
- Sid Waddell, darts commentator
- Peter Warfield, England rugby player
- Henry Wriothesley, 3rd Earl of Southampton, patron of William Shakespeare
- Jez Butterworth, film director

=== Poets ===
- William Barnes, poet
- Richard Eberhart, poet, winner of 1966 Pulitzer Prize for poetry, United States Poet Laureate, 1969-61
- Robert Herrick, author of renowned poem "To the Virgins, to Make Much of Time"
- Ben Jonson (statutably admitted), poet
- Edward de Vere, 17th Earl of Oxford, courtier and poet, subject of the Oxfordian theory of Shakespeare authorship
- William Wordsworth, major English Romantic poet and Poet Laureate of the United Kingdom, 1843–50
- Thomas Wyatt, courtier and poet

=== Musicians ===
- James Anderson-Besant, organist and choir director
- William Sterndale Bennett, 19th-century composer
- Andrew Carwood, Director of Music St Paul's Cathedral (2007), tenor and conductor
- Christopher Gabbitas, singer
- Andrew Gant, chorister and composer
- Harry Gregson-Williams, film score composer and Golden Globe nominee
- Rupert Gregson-Williams, film score composer and recipient of the European Film composer award
- George Guest, Welsh choral conductor, college organist 1951–91
- Herbert Howells, English composer, college organist
- Geoffrey Paterson, conductor, college organist
- John Scott, English organist, organ scholar 1974–78, organist of St Paul's 1990–2004

== Academics, philosophers, and explorers ==
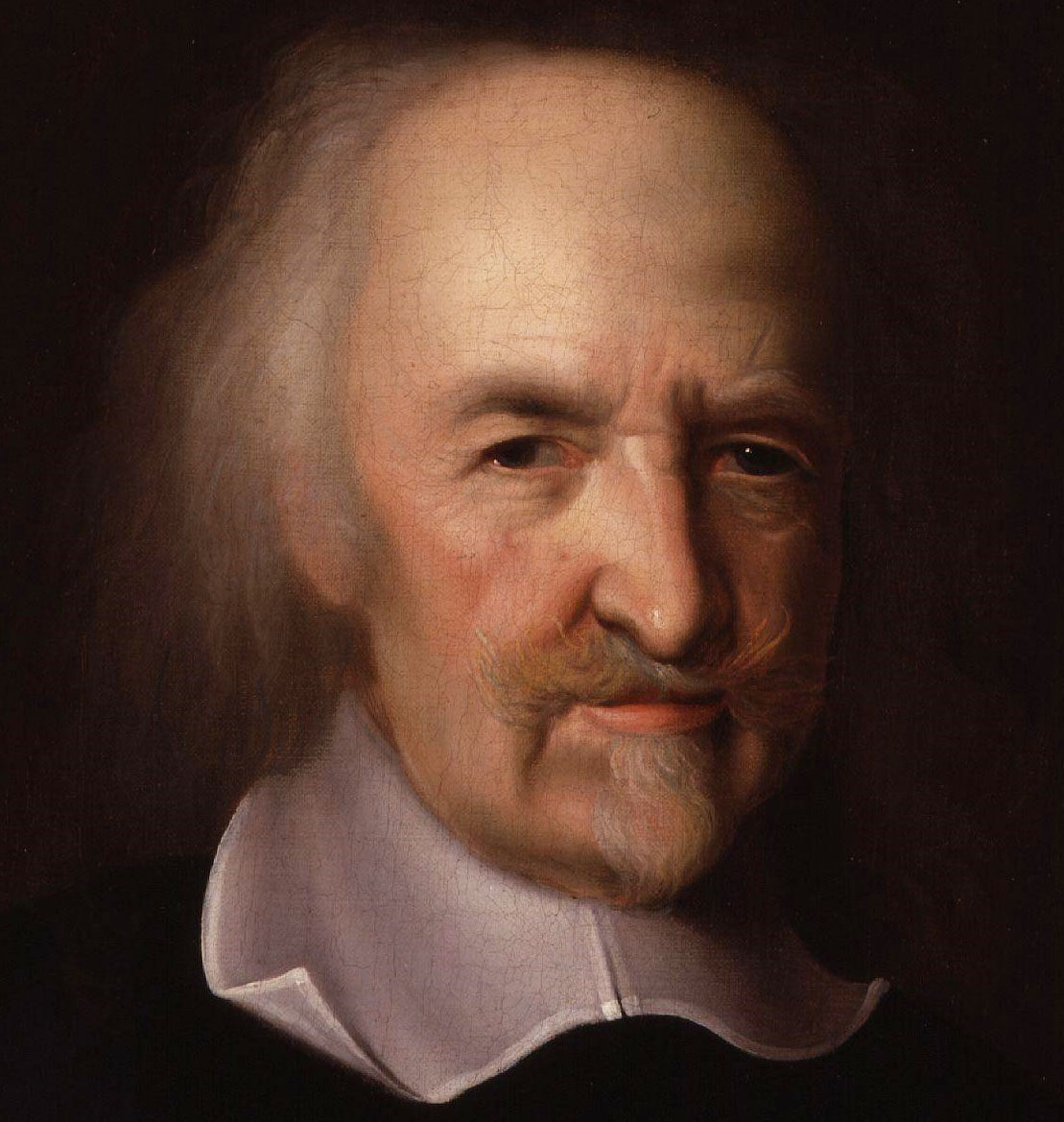
Thomas Hobbes obtained a BA by incorporation while tutoring his patron William Cavendish at St John's in 1608.

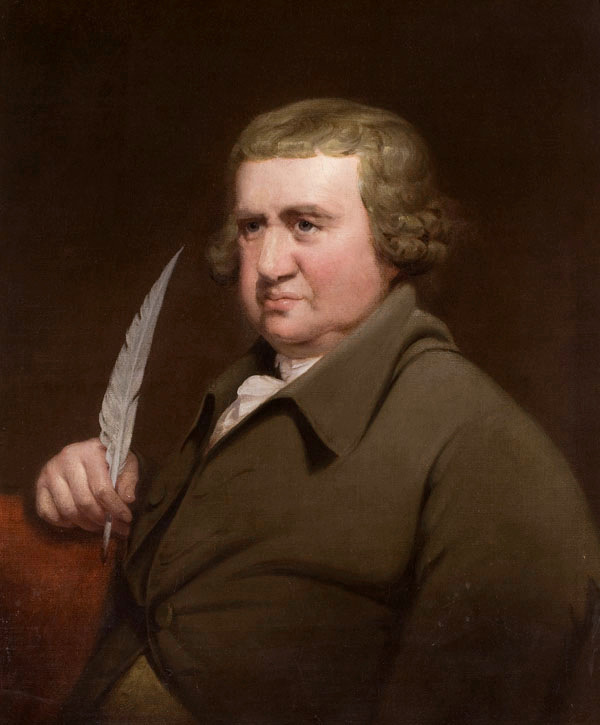
Erasmus Darwin

- Gregory Bateson, anthropologist
- Owen Chadwick, church historian, Vice-Chancellor of the University of Cambridge, 1969–71
- Baron Kikuchi Dairoku, Japanese Minister of Education, 1901-3, President of Tokyo University, 1898-01
- Erasmus Darwin, key thinker of the Midlands Enlightenment and founding member of the Lunar Society of Birmingham
- John Gordon Dower, architect and leading light to create the National Parks of England and Wales
- Livingston Farrand, President of Cornell University, 1921–37
- Sir Vivian Fuchs, President of the Royal Geographical Society, completed the first overland crossing of Antarctica
- Charles Sydney Gibbes, English tutor of Tsarevich Alexei Nikolaevich of Russia
- Andrew D. Hamilton, Vice-Chancellor of the University of Oxford, 2009–15, President of New York University, 2016–
- William Richard Hamilton, President of the Royal Geographical Society
- Peter Hennessy, English historian of government
- John Stevens Henslow English clergyman, botanist and geologist
- Thomas Hobbes, philosopher
- Edward Latymer, founder of Latymer Upper School and The Latymer School
- Sir Donald MacAlister, 1st Baronet, physician and chancellor of the University of Glasgow
- Richard Cockburn Maclaurin, President of the Massachusetts Institute of Technology, 1909–20
- Victor Alessandro Mundella, physicist and Principal of Sunderland Technical College
- E. J. Rapson, numismatist and professor of Sanskrit (1906–36) at the University of Cambridge
- W. H. R. Rivers, anthropologist
- Sir Humphry Davy Rolleston, 1st Baronet, President of the Royal College of Physicians, 1922–25
- Max Rosenheim, President of the Royal College of Physicians, 1966–71
- Grafton Elliot Smith, Egyptologist and anthropologist
- Stephen Sykes, theologian, former Dean of St John's and Bishop of Ely, and principal of St John's College, Durham
- Frank Thistlethwaite, Vice-Chancellor of the University of East Anglia (1961–1980)
- Bhaskar Vira, Pro-Vice-Chancellor for Education at the University of Cambridge
- Sir Thomas Watson, 1st Baronet, President of the Royal College of Physicians, 1862–66
- Peter Whelan (lawyer), Professor of Law
- Anthony Wolf
- Sir James Wordie, President of the Royal Geographical Society, helped plan the first successful ascent of Mount Everest

== Religion ==
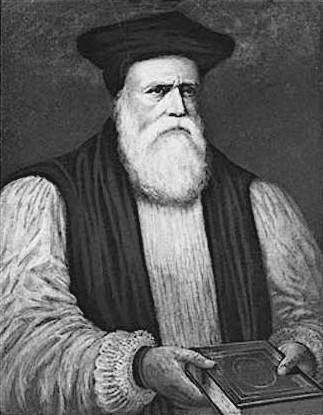
William Morgan (1564) was the first to translate the Bible into Welsh.

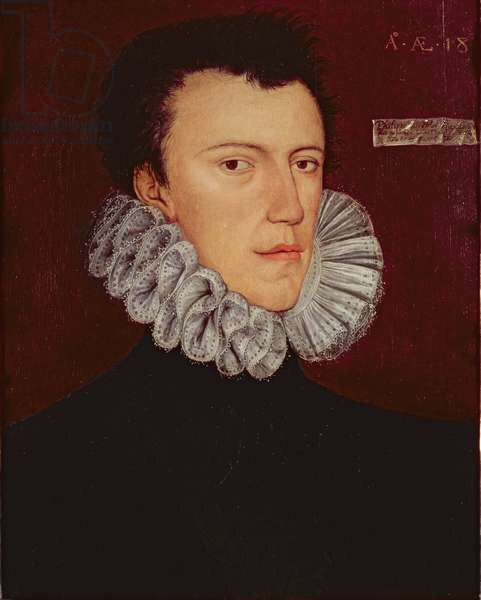
Saint Philip Howard

- Christina Beardsley, priest and advocate for transgender inclusion in the Church of England
- Haslefoot Bridges, English Puritan minister
- Thomas Carter, Puritan minister in the Massachusetts Bay Colony and signatory of the Dedham Covenant
- Oliver Carter (priest), Church of England clergyman
- William Cassels, missionary and member of the Cambridge Seven
- D'Ewes Coke, clergyman and colliery master
- John Colenso, Bishop of Natal, 1853–83
- Richard Hancorn, English clergyman and aristocrat
- Henry Martyn, missionary to India and Persia
- William Morgan, Bishop of Llandaff and Bishop of St Asaph; Welsh Bible translator
- Titus Oates, chaplain who fabricated the "Popish Plot"
- Edward Stillingfleet, British theologian and scholar

=== Roman Catholic cardinals, saints and martyrs ===
- William Andleby, martyr
- Saint John Fisher (Fellow and Founder), martyr and cardinal
- Saint Richard Gwyn, martyr
- Saint Philip Howard, 20th Earl of Arundel, martyr
- Philip Howard, cardinal
- William Howard, 1st Viscount Stafford, martyr

=== Anglican archbishops ===
- Richard Boyle, Archbishop of Tuam, 1638–45
- Peter Carnley, Primate of Australia 2000–05, Archbishop of Perth 1981–2005
- Lowther Clarke, Archbishop of Melbourne, 1905–20
- Donald Coggan, Archbishop of Canterbury, 1974–1980
- John Cradock, Archbishop of Dublin, 1772–78
- Harrington Lees, Archbishop of Melbourne, 1921–29
- Richard Neile, Archbishop of York, 1631–40
- Edwin Sandys, Archbishop of York, 1577–88
- George Selwyn, Primate and 1st bishop of New Zealand, 1841–67
- Gerald Sharp, Archbishop of Brisbane, 1921–33
- William Stuart, Archbishop of Armagh, 1800–22
- John Williams, Archbishop of York, 1641–50, Lord Keeper of the Great Seal, 1621–25
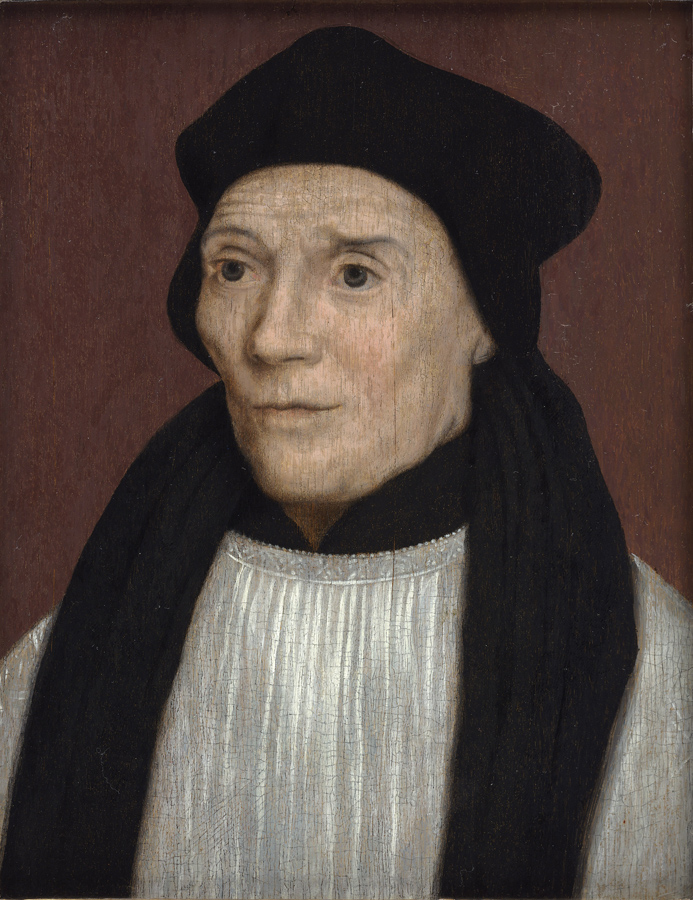
Saint John Fisher

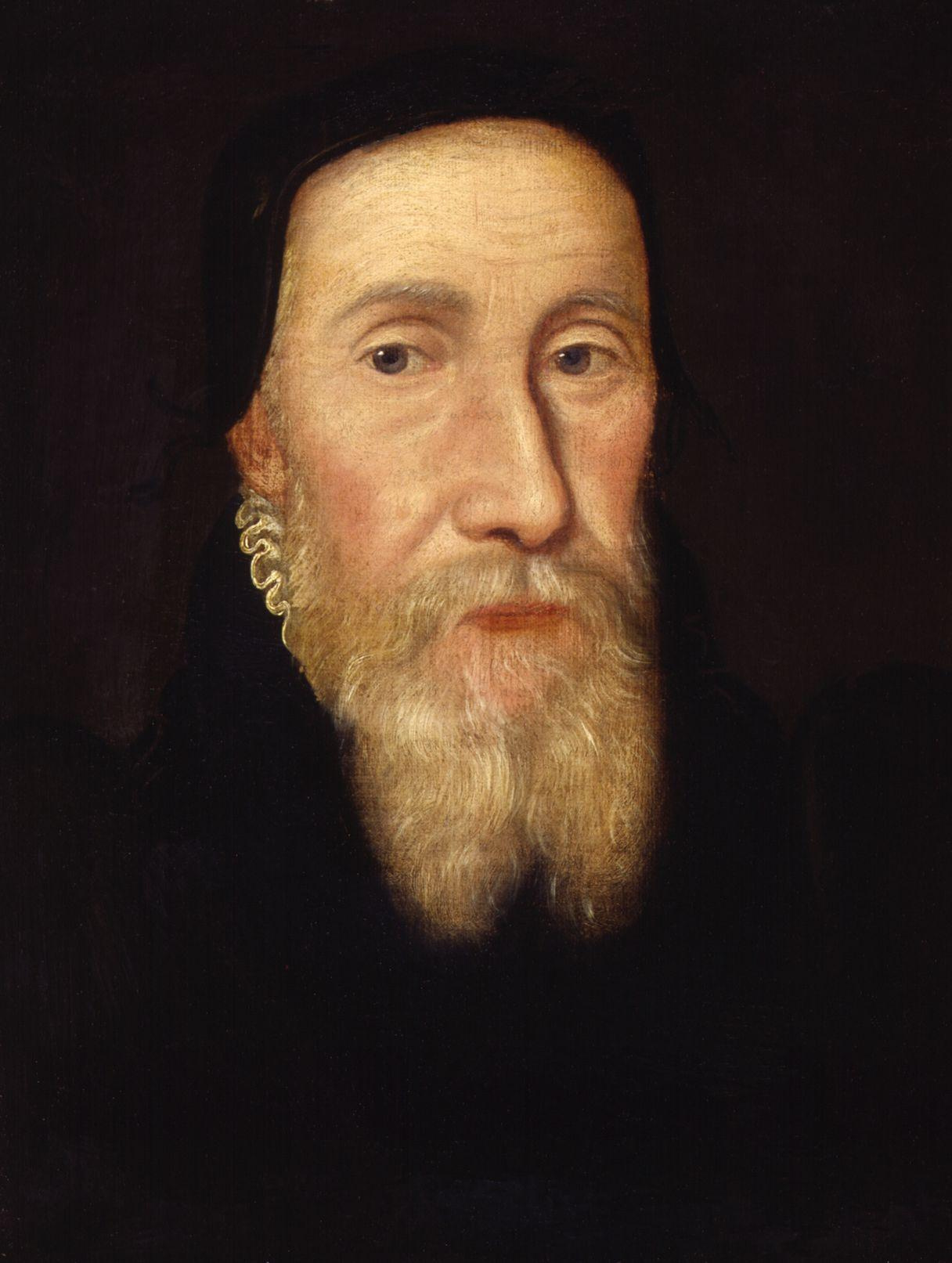
Edwin Sandys

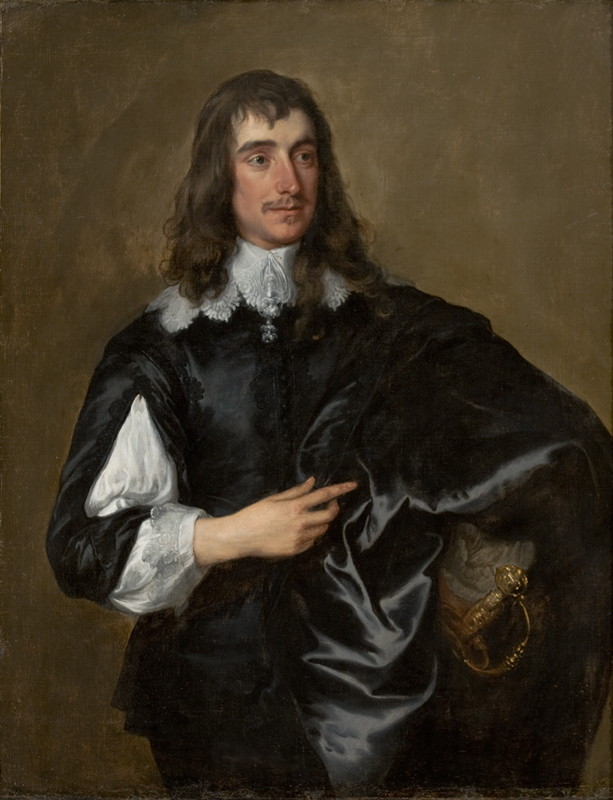
William Howard

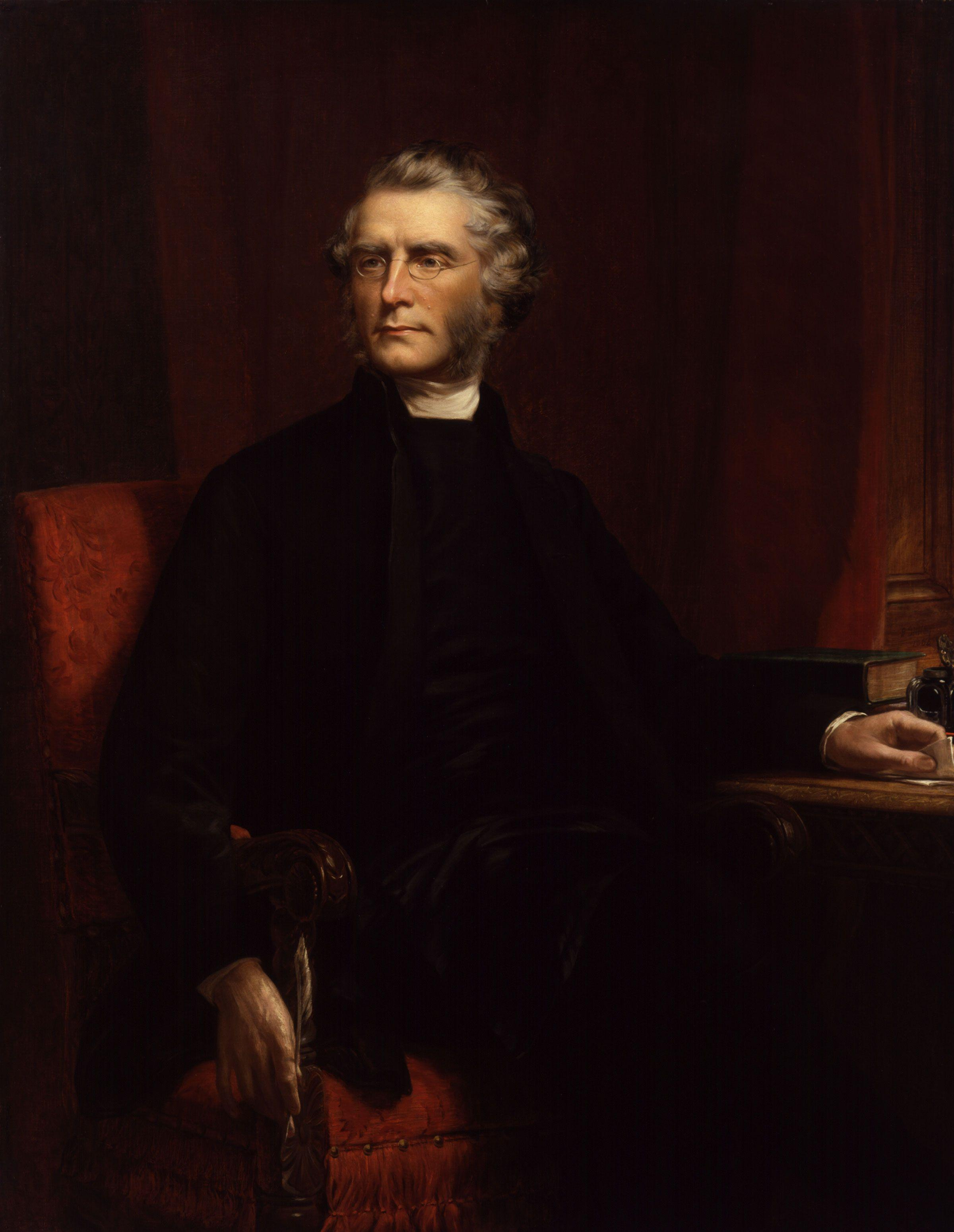
John Colenso

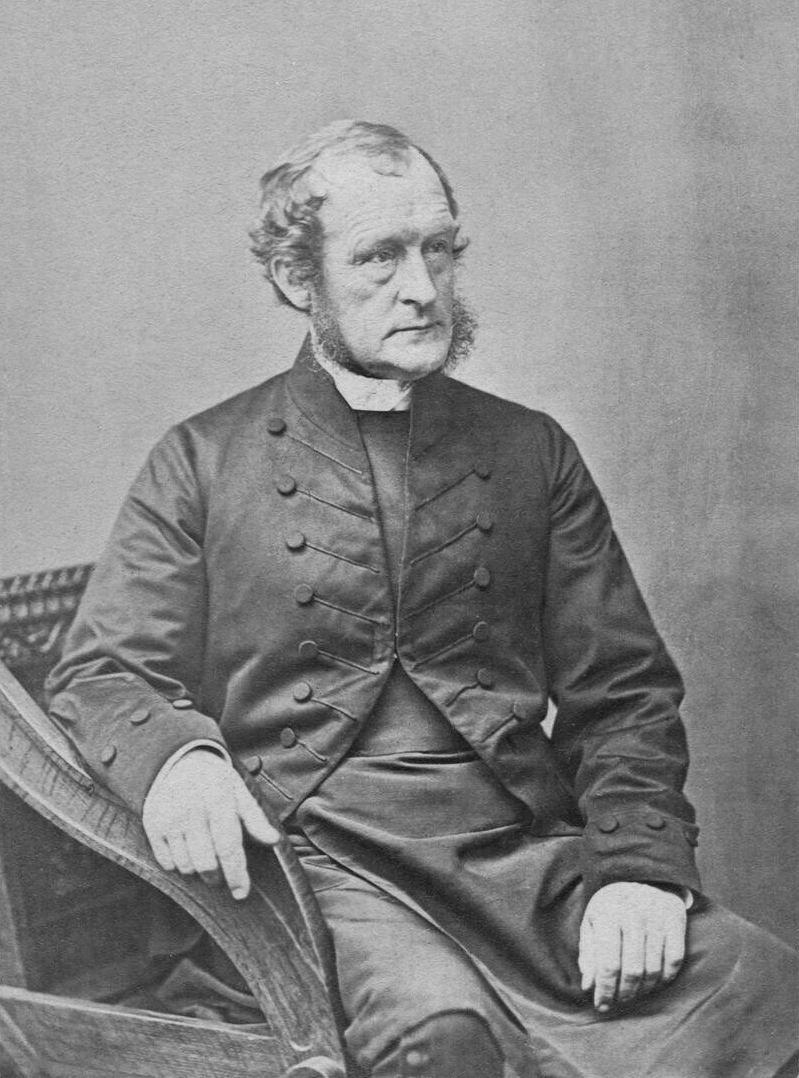
George Selwyn

== Business ==
- John Browne, Baron Browne of Madingley, CEO of BP, 1995–2007
- Damon Buffini, former head of private equity firm Permira
- Mike Clasper, chairman of Coats Group, 2013–present
- Charles Corfield, founder of Frame Technology Corporation
- Mark Coombs, billionaire and CEO of Ashmore Group
- Gavyn Davies, multi-millionaire and former Goldman Sachs partner, chairman of BBC, 2001–04
- Sir Harpal Kumar, CEO of Cancer Research UK, 2007–18
- Dame Louise Makin, CEO of BTG plc, 2004–present
- Sir Mark Moody-Stuart, chairman of Royal Dutch Shell, 1998–2001
- Richard Reed, Adam Balon and Jon Wright, co-founders of Innocent Drinks
- Thomas Sutton, founder of Charterhouse School and one of 16th-century England's wealthiest individuals
- Hon. John Tayloe III, planter and one of the wealthiest men in America in the early 19th century
- Kenneth Thomson, 2nd Baron Thomson of Fleet, ninth richest man in the world upon his death in 2006
- Eben Upton, CEO of Raspberry Pi Ltd.
- Charles Woodburn, CEO of BAE Systems, 2017–present
