= Robin Alexander =

British educationist and academic

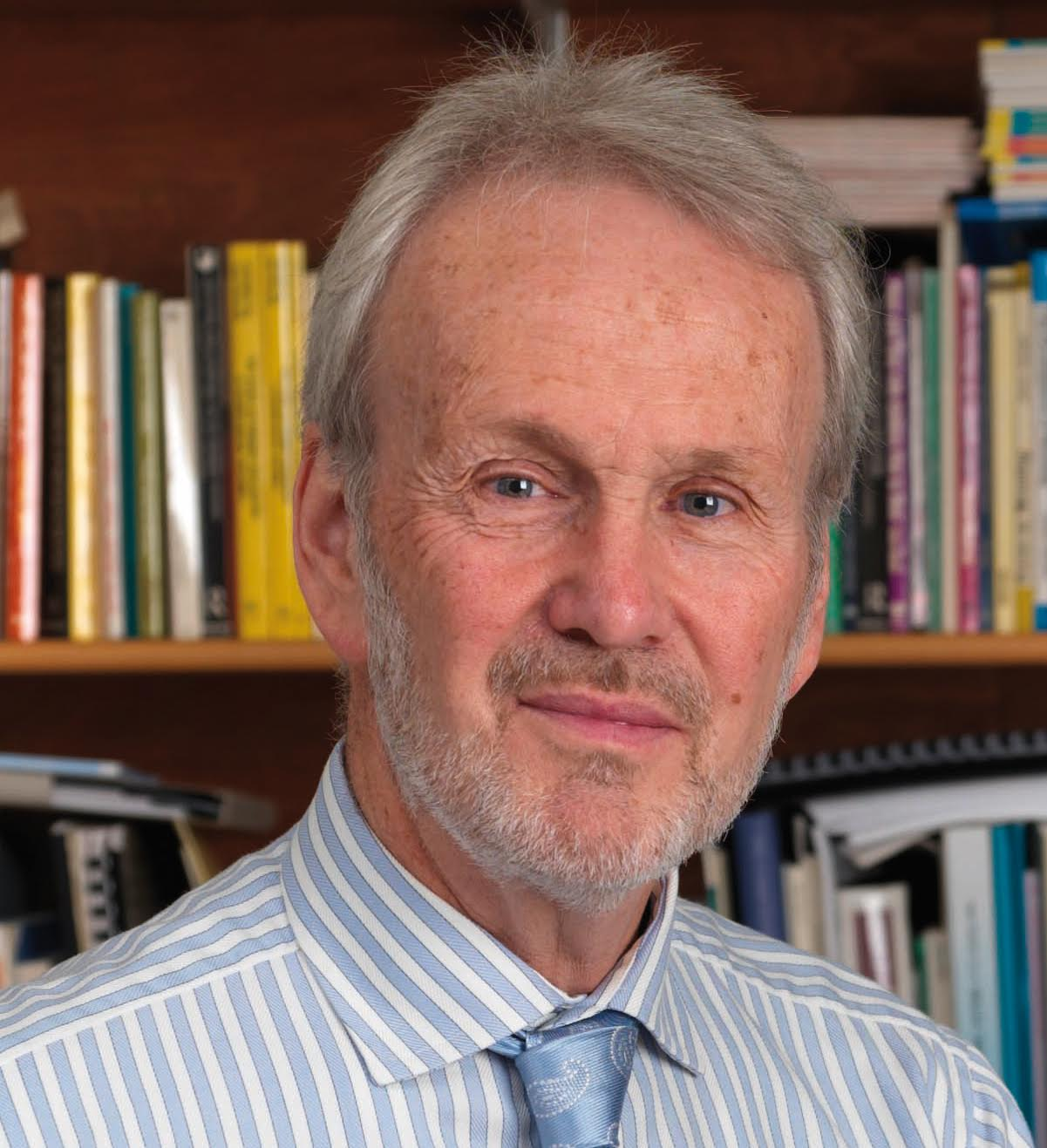
Professor Robin Alexander

Robin Alexander is a British educationist and academic known particularly for championing the cause of primary education, for his leadership of the Cambridge Primary Review, and for his research and writing on education policy, culture, curriculum, pedagogy, dialogic teaching and comparative and international education. He is currently Fellow of Wolfson College at the University of Cambridge and Professor of Education Emeritus at the University of Warwick. In 2011 he was elected Fellow of the British Academy (FBA), the UK's national academy for the humanities and social sciences and chaired its Education Section from 2018 to 2021.

== Career ==
The son of artist Isabel Alexander and documentary film-maker Donald Alexander, he was born in 1941 and educated at the Perse School and the universities of Cambridge (Downing College, MA, PhD, LittD), Durham (PGCE), London (Ac Dip Ed) and Manchester (MEd), and at Trinity College of Music (ATCL). He taught in schools and colleges before moving to the universities of Leeds (1977–95) and Warwick (1995–2001), at both of which he was Professor of Education. In 2001 he moved to Cambridge University, as Visiting Fellow of Hughes Hall (2001–2), Leverhulme Emeritus Fellow (2002–4), Fellow of Wolfson College (since 2004), Professorial Director of Research in the Faculty of Education (2006–10) and Director of the Cambridge Primary Review (2006–12). From 2013 to 2017 he combined his Cambridge affiliation with an honorary chair at the University of York and leadership of the Cambridge Primary Review Trust (CPRT), a not-for-profit company dedicated to building on the work of the Cambridge Primary Review. At the University of York he also co-directed the joint CPRT/IEE project on dialogic teaching and social disadvantage, funded 2014–17 and successfully subjected to randomised control trial by the Education Endowment Foundation.

== Public roles ==
- Council for National Academic Awards (CNAA) (1975–84)
- Chair, Association for the Study of Primary Education, 1987–89
- Council for the Accreditation of Teacher Education (CATE) (1989–94)
- Department for Education and Science (DES) ‘three wise men’ enquiry into primary education (1991–2)
- BFI/TES Warnock Commission on the Teaching of English (1992–3)
- Government of India District Primary Education Programme and Sarva Shiksha Abhiyan, technical support on behalf of the European Commission (EC) and the Department for International Development (DfID) (1995–2005)
- Board of the Qualifications and Curriculum Authority (QCA) (1997–2002)
- Adviser to Hong Kong Council for Academic Accreditation and University Grants Committee (Hong Kong) (1999–2005)
- Office for Standards in Education (Ofsted) enquiry into the Education of Six-Year Olds in England, Denmark and Finland (2002–03)
- Director, Dialogos UK Ltd (2004–)
- Director, Cambridge Primary Review, 2006–2012
- President, British Association for International and Comparative Education, 2008–09
- Court, Bishop Grosseteste University (2011–)
- International Steering Committee, Van Leer Jerusalem Institute (2012–13)
- Chair, Director and Trustee, Cambridge Primary Review Trust (2012–17)
- Strategic Committee, Expert Subject Advisory Groups (ESAG) (2013–16)
- Board of Governors, Bath Spa University (2013–18)
- Vice-President, Early Education (2014–15)
- Board of Trustees, Children and the Arts, formerly the Prince's Foundation for Children and the Arts (2014–21).

== Publications ==
Alexander's research has yielded more than 300 publications. These deal mainly with pedagogy and classroom research, discourse analysis and classroom talk reform, curriculum, the educational policy process and its impact, and international, comparative and development education. Much of this work has focused on the primary phase of schooling. His books and monographs include:

- Professional Studies for Teaching (1979)
- Developments in PGCE Courses (1980)
- Advanced Study for Teachers (1981)
- The Self-Evaluating Institution (1982)
- Primary Teaching (1984)
- Change in Teacher Education (1984)
- Changing Primary Practice (1989)
- Policy and Practice in Primary Education (1992)
- Curriculum Organisation and Classroom Practice in Primary Schools (1992)
- Innocence and Experience: reconstructing primary education (1994)
- Versions of Primary Education (1995)
- Other Primary Schools and Ours: hazards of international comparison (1996)
- Policy and Practice in Primary Education: local initiative, national agenda (1997)
- Time for Change: curriculum managers at work (1998)
- Learning from Comparing: new directions in comparative educational research: Volume 1, Contexts, Classrooms and Outcomes (1999)
- Learning from Comparing: new directions in comparative educational research: Volume 2, Policy, Professionals and development (2000)
- Culture and Pedagogy (2001)
- Towards Dialogic Teaching (2004, 5th edition 2017)
- Education as Dialogue: moral and pedagogical choices for a runaway world (2006)
- Essays on Pedagogy (2008)
- Education for All, the Quality Imperative and the Problem of Pedagogy (1998)
- Children, their World, their Education: final report and recommendations of the Cambridge Primary Review (2010)
- The Cambridge Primary Review Research Surveys (2010).
- A Dialogic Teaching Companion (2020)
- Education in Spite of Policy (2022)
- Rhondda Portraits (2024)

He has been an occasional columnist for the Times Educational Supplement, The Guardian and other national newspapers and from 2014 to 2017 edited and contributed to the weekly CPRT Blog.

== Honours and awards ==
- American Educational Research Association (AERA) Outstanding Book Award (for Culture and Pedagogy), 2001
- Society for Educational Studies Book Awards, First Prize (for Culture and Pedagogy), 2002
- Sir Edward Youde Memorial Visiting Professor, Hong Kong Institute of Education, 2005–06
- Honorary Fellow (FCollT), the College of Teachers, 2009
- Honorary doctorates from Manchester Metropolitan University and Bishop Grosseteste University, 2010
- Miegunyah Distinguished Visiting Fellow, University of Melbourne, 2010
- C.K.Koh Visiting Professor, National Institute of Education, Singapore, 2010
- Fellow of the Academy of Social Sciences (FAcSS), 2011
- Association for Managers in Education (AMiE) Award for Services to Education, 2011
- Fellow of the British Academy (FBA), 2011
- National Union of Teachers, Fred and Anne Jarvis Award for Campaigning for Education, 2011
- Society for Educational Studies Book Awards, First Prize (for Children, their World, their Education), 2011
- Cambridge Journal of Education Best Paper Prize, 2011
- BERA/Sage Public Impact Award for initiation and leadership of the Cambridge Primary Review and Cambridge Primary Review Trust (2015).
- Honorary doctorate from The Open University (2018).
