= Asaf Ali Asghar Fyzee =

Indian diplomat and scholar (1899–1981)

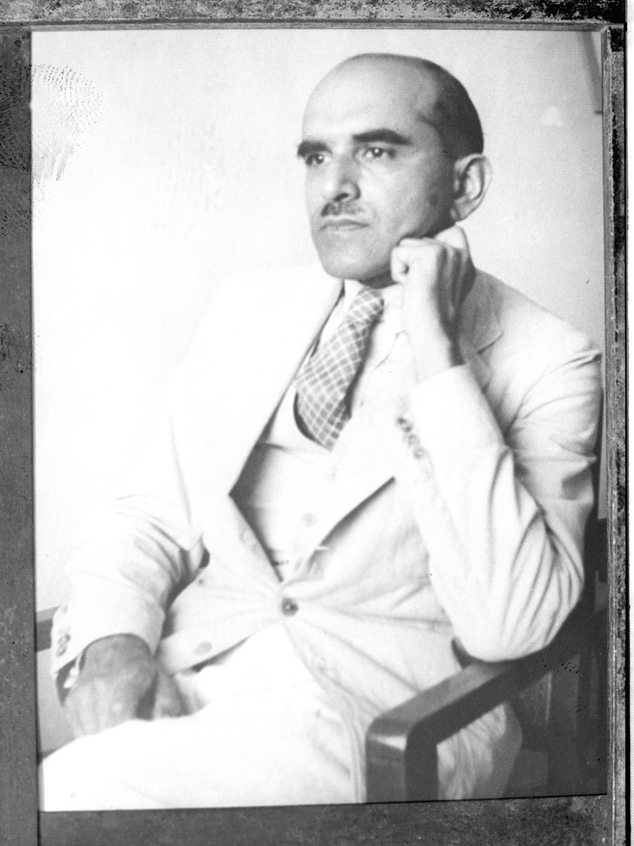
- Fyzee in June 1949

Ambassador of India to Egypt
- In office 1949-1952
- Preceded by: Syud Hossain
- Succeeded by: K. M. Panikkar

Personal details
- Born: 10 April 1899 Matheran, Bombay Presidency, British India
- Died: 23 October 1981 (aged 82) Mumbai, Maharashtra, India
- Relatives: Tyabji family
- Education: St John's College, Cambridge
- Occupation: Educator; author; jurist; diplomat; Islamic scholar
- Awards: Padma Bhushan (1962)
- Notable Works: Outlines of Muhammadan law; A Modern Approach to Islam; Cases in the Muhammadan Law of India, Pakistan and Bangladesh
- Cricket career

Cricket information

Domestic team information
- Years: Team
- 1928-1930: Muslims

Career statistics
Competition	FC
Matches	2
Runs scored	17
Batting average	8.50
100s/50s	-/-
Top score	8*
Catches/stumpings	1/-

Asaf Ali Asghar Fyzee (10 April 1899 – 23 October 1981) was an Indian educator, jurist, author, diplomat, and Islamic scholar who is considered one of leading pioneers of modern Ismaili studies. He also served as India's second ambassador to Egypt from 1949 to 1952, and Vice-Chancellor of the University of Jammu and Kashmir from 1957 to 1960.

His best-known literary work is Outlines of Muhammadan law, which states that "in order to understand Islamic law, one has to be familiar with historic and cultural background of the law". He was honoured with the Padma Bhushan award by the President of India in 1962, India's third highest civilian award. In his writings, Fyzee advocates the need to incorporate modern reforms in Islamic law without compromising on the "essential spirit of Islam". Fyzee was the grandson of Budruddin Tyabji and a member of the notable Tyabji family.

== Early life ==
Fyzee was born on 10 April 1899 to the Tyabji family of Sulaymani Ismaili Bohra in the Matheran town of Maharashtra. In his early years Fyzee was heir apparent to Nawab Sidi Sir Ahmad Khan Sidi Ibrahim Khan III the Nawab of Janjira state, as his marriage to Nazli Begum had failed to produce an heir. The selection of Fyzee was discouraged and Sir Ahmed Khan ultimately remarried. During his time at Janjira, Fyzee was taught Sanskrit, Persian, Urdu, and Arabic along with shooting and swordsmanship. Fyzee took his initial education in Mumbai and completed his LL.B degree at Government Law College, Mumbai. In 1922, he went to England and studied at St John's College, Cambridge. At Cambridge, he also studied Arabic and Persian under eminent orientalist Reynold A. Nicholson.

He competed in a few First-class cricket matches between 1928 and 1930.

== Career ==
In 1925, at the age of 26, he became a barrister-at-law and started his career as an advocate in the Bombay High Court from 1926 to 1938.

From 1938 to 1947, Fyzee was Principal and Perry Professor of Jurisprudence in Government Law College, Mumbai. After the partition of India, he remained in that country and served as the second Indian ambassador to Egypt from 1949 to 1952. In 1952 he was appointed as a member of the Union Public Service Commission, New Delhi. He also held the position of Vice-Chancellor of the University of Jammu and Kashmir from 1957 to 1960.

== Writings ==
We need not bother about nomenclature, but if some name has be [sic] given to it, let us call it liberal Islam

— Fyzee on Liberalism in Islam

Apart from his academic and government duties, Fyzee made significant contributions to the modern scholarship of Ismaili studies. He wrote several books based on Islam, which promoted the idea of modernizing Islam.

Following are some of books written by Fyzee.

- Outlines of Muhammadan law: This is Fyzee's most famous book. The first edition was published in 1949 by Oxford University Press. This book discuss topics related to "Islamic law" with respect to India and topics related to "Freedom of religion". The fourth edition of the book included topics related to change in English law with respect to Muslim immigrants in England. It also incorporated new laws resulting from the formation of Bangladesh and the introduction of Islamic policies in Pakistan.
- A modern approach to Islam: This book posits a re-interpretation of Islamic jurisprudence and re-discovery of original Islamic philosophy. In this book, Fyzee argues that modern reforms can be incorporated in Islamic law without compromising on the "essential spirit of Islam".
- Cases in the Muhammadan law of India and Pakistan
- Cases in the Muhammadan law of India, Pakistan, and Bangladesh
- Compendium of Fatimid Law
- The Pillars of Islam

== Honours and recognition ==
- In 1956 Fyzee was elected as a corresponding member of the Arab Academy of Damascus.
- He was the honorary secretary of the Islamic Research Association from 1933 to 1949.
- He was awarded the Padma Bhushan by the President of India, the third highest civilian award of India.
- He is listed as a “famous Johnian” or notable alumnus of St John’s college, Cambridge.
- He was an original associated member on the executive committee of the Encyclopaedia of Islam.
- He lectured as a visiting professor in several American and Canadian universities.
- He was a member of the Royal Asiatic Society.
- He held the "Commonwealth Fellowship".
- He was a member of the Indian delegation to the Third General Conference of UNESCO, held in Beirut in November 1948.

== See also ==
- Syed Akbaruddin
