= Oliver Carter (priest) =

Church of England clergyman

The Reverend Oliver Carter

Personal details
- Born: c. 1540
- Died: 1605 (aged about 65)
- Buried: Collegiate Church, Manchester
- Denomination: Anglican
- Spouse: "Eme" (m. ?; died 1590); Alice (m. ?; his death)
- Children: at least 7 from first marriage
- Education: St. John's College, Cambridge

Oliver Carter (c. 1540 – 1605) was a Church of England clergyman and divine.

== Biography ==
=== Education ===
Oliver Carter was probably a native of that part of Richmondshire which is in the historic county of Lancaster. He was admitted a scholar of St. John's College, Cambridge, on the Lady Margaret's foundation, in November 1555; he was BA 1559–60; fellow, 18 March 1562–3; MA, 1563; senior fellow, 28 April 1564; and college preacher, 25 April 1565, William Fulke also serving in the same capacity. He was BD in 1569. Later in life the title STP is found attached to his name.

=== Scandals ===
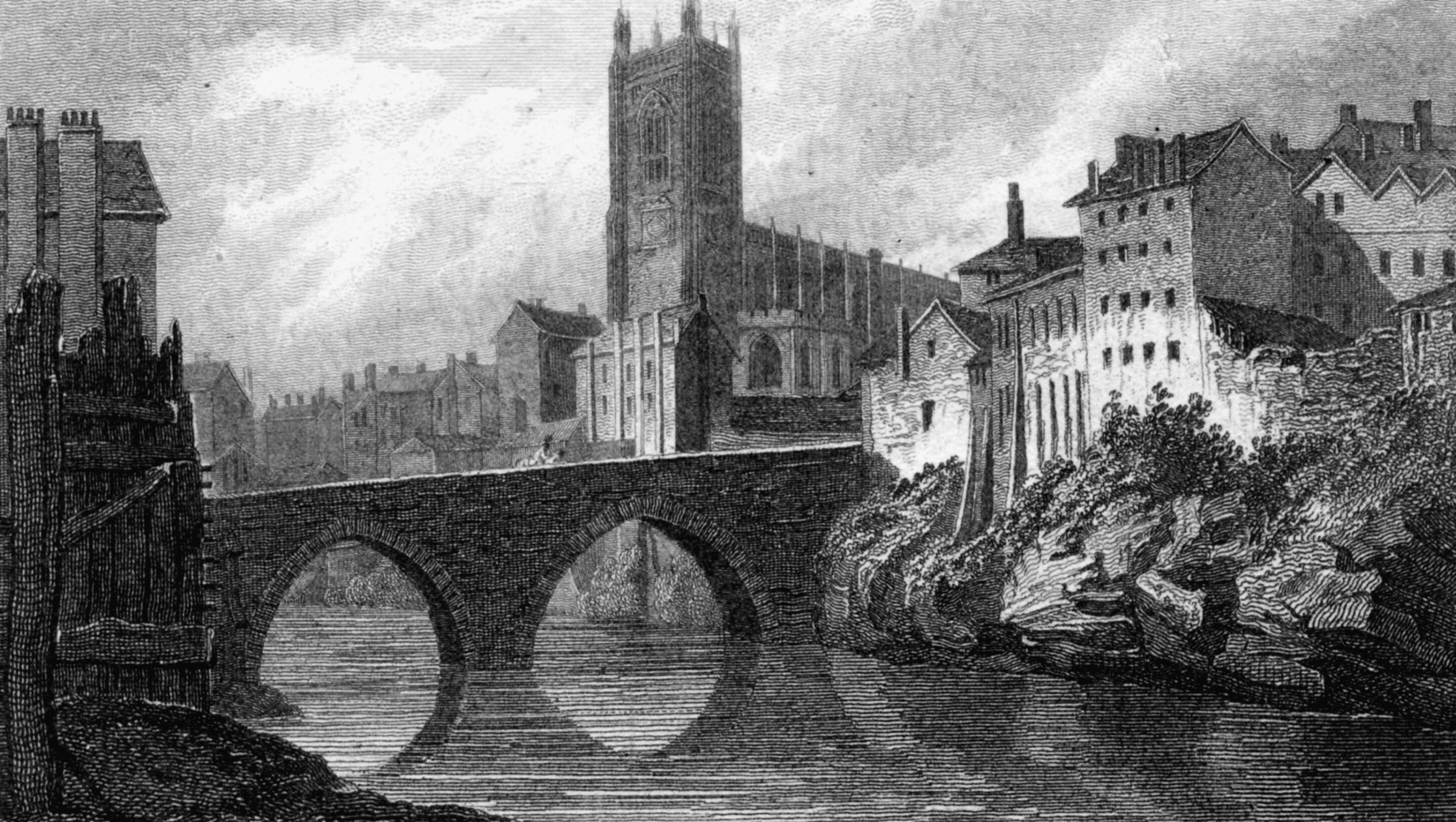
Salford Old Bridge, in Manchester, with the Church visible in the background (1800)

Carter's first known promotion was to a preacher's place in the collegiate church of Manchester. This was after June 1571; his appointment as fellow there has been placed too early by Churton and others. His name first appears in the local records on the occasion of the baptism of his child Sarah on 6 October 1573, when he is called "Mr. Olyver Carter". Herle, the warden of the college, complaining of the bitter antagonism of the Roman Catholic population of the district, described in a letter to Lord Burghley, dated in April 1574, how "our preacher, who is a bachelor of divinity", was riding out on 14 March to one of the neighbouring chapels, when he was assaulted and wounded.

Carter seems at first to have connived with Herle in making unfavourable grants of the college lands upon long leases and small rents, though soon after he resisted the spoliation. One of these questionable grants was that by which the warden and the fellow-chaplains, September 1575, bestowed the stewardship of the lands and property of the college upon Edmund Trafford, Esq. and his heirs; this document, signed by the warden, Carter, and two other fellows, is still preserved among the muniments of the De Trafford family at Trafford Hall. Funds were not always available for the payment of the stipends of the members of the foundation; and it is suggestive to find, with respect to Carter, that it was about this time that he was assisted out of the money provided by the bounty of Robert Nowell. The executors of that benevolent man, one of them his brother, Alexander Nowell, the famous dean of St Paul's, lent "to one Mr. Carter, a preacher at Manchester", 40s., "to be repayed again the 20th March Ao 1575", i.e. 1575–6. Soon after he borrowed 40s. more, when his entire debt was 4l. On 20 November 1576 there was a further loan of 5l. Carter's introduction to the college occurred at a critical point in its history, being then in so pitiful a condition that it was near dissolution. The warden, said by some to have been a papist, was non-resident; the fabric of the church was in decay; there had been no election of churchwardens from 1563 to 1571; painted pictures, in spite of the regulations to the contrary, still adorned the walls; and the only plate the church possessed was one broken chalice. Carter bitterly complained to Burghley, with whom he seems to have been intimate, on the condition of the college and parish; but he was unable to bring about any measures of relief until he enlisted the sympathy of Dean Nowell, in whom he found a ready "compassion for the college, the town, and country", i.e. county.

=== Works ===
Carter was already a fellow, and acting apparently as sub-warden, when, in 1576, he was plaintiff in a suit in the Duchy Court against Herle, concerning his unpaid stipend. His great charges in this "most necessary suit" are alluded to by Dean Nowell (28 October 1576), who, with Carter, was named fellow of the collegiate body by the new charter of 1578. Carter is met with in 1579 as befriending Thomas Sorocold, "scholar of Manchester", who afterwards wrote the popular Supplications of Saints. The only book which came from Carter's pen was of a controversial character, being a reply to a work by Dr. Richard Bristow, called Motives to the Catholic Faith, in 1574, afterwards issued in 1576 and called Demaunds to be proposed of Catholikes to the Heretickes. This double title explains Hollinworth's otherwise puzzling statement that Carter "writ a book in answer to Bristow's Motives". The reply came out in 1579, and was entitled An Answeare made by Oliver Carter, Bachelor of Divinitie, vnto Certaine Popishe Questions and Demawndes (London, 8vo). It was printed by Thomas Dawson for George Bishop, and was entered on the Stationers' Hall Registers 4 February 1578–9, by Mr. Bishop the younger, warden of the company. It is a very rare book, the only known copies being those in the University Library, Cambridge, and the Chetham Library, Manchester. Dr. White refers to it in his Way to the True Church, 4to, 1624. Fulke also replied to Bristow's work. Carter dedicated his Answer to his very good lord, Henry, Earl of Derby, at whose houses in Lancashire in subsequent years he, with other prominent ministers, was a frequent guest or preacher.

=== Later life ===
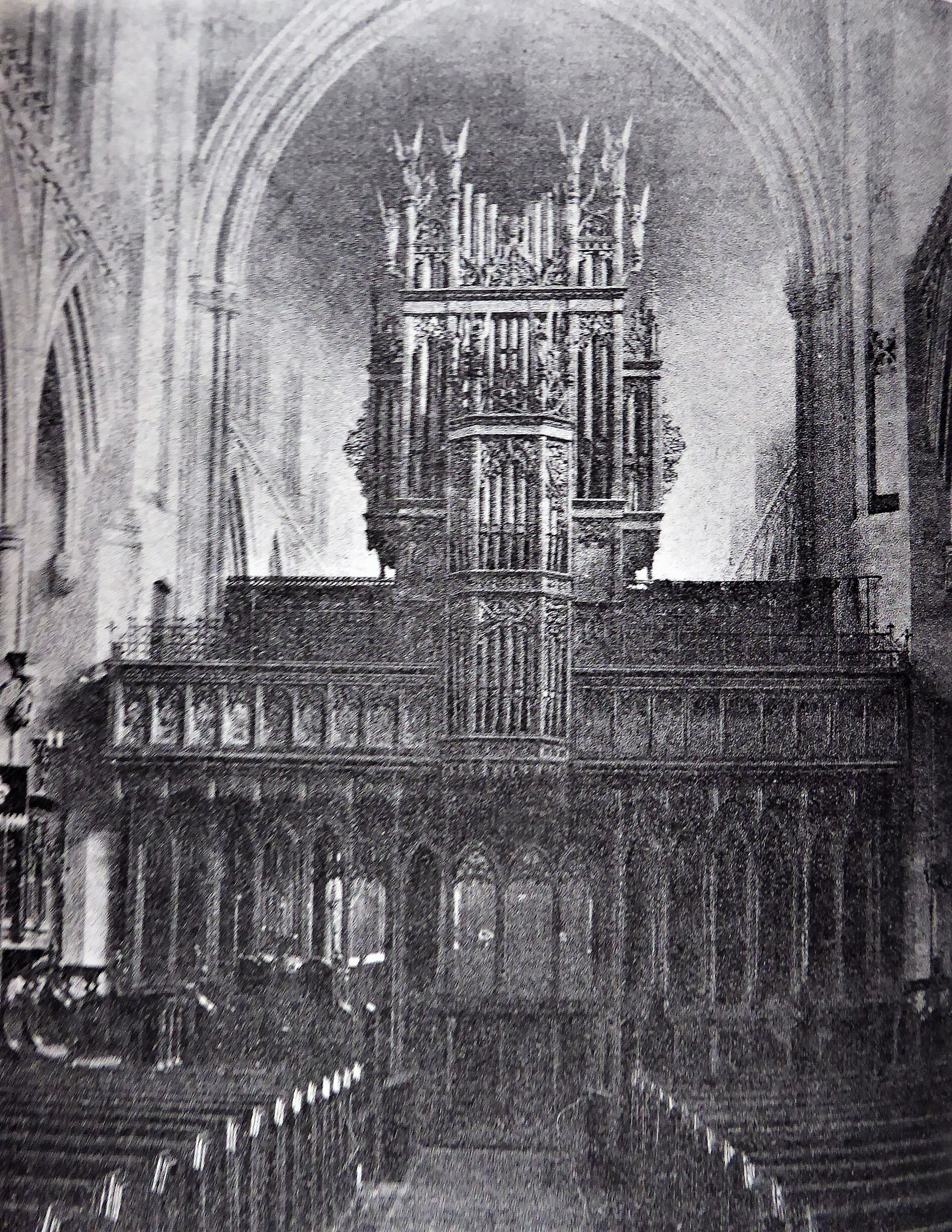
The Church organ, as seen looking down the nave (c. 1890)

In 1581, during the wardenship of Bishop Chaderton, Carter was conferring with Lord Burghley about the surrender of the college leases granted in Herle's time. The bishop on 1 September 1585 nominated "Mr. Carter, B.D., and preacher of Manchester", one of the moderators of the monthly assemblies, called "Prophesyings", to meet in each deanery. In 1590 he instituted an action in the Duchy Court concerning the tithes of his parish. In the same year he set his name to a remarkable paper drawn up by the Lancashire ministers of his neighbourhood, describing what are called the "enormities" of the ecclesiastical state, enumerating many matters that called for reform; and he signed also a letter to the Archbishop of York urging action in the same direction. Both letters, which give a curious picture of old religious customs, are printed in the Chetham Miscellanies, vol. v. On 31 May 1595 it was charged against him, at an inquiry at his church, that being "the preacher there" he made wills, and was a common solicitor in temporal causes. He was highly shocked that year at the news of the coming of Dr. Dee to be warden; in July Dee notes that he had had a letter from him. On Dee's arrival a very bitter hostility arose between them; Carter would not consent to the use of an organ in the church, which Dee favoured, nor would he agree to the payment of money for Dee's house-rent. Other scandalous quarrels occurred in the chapter-house and the church. In January 1597 Carter was threatening Dee with a prosecution in London. On Sunday, 25 September that year Dee alludes to Carter's "impudent and evident disobedience" in the church (not "dissoluteness", as printed in the Camden Society's edition of the Diary).

=== Death ===
The circumstances of Carter's death were long remembered in Manchester. "Hee fell sicke in the pulpit as hee was preaching of God's providing a succession of godly ministers, on Matt. ix. 38; and Mr. William Burne went up immediately into the pulpit, and God assisting him, preached on the same text—a visible and present proofe of Mr. Carter's doctrine". His health was probably affected by the visit of a pestilence that year, of which there is a suggestive record in the register of burials. He made his will on 22 February 1604–5. He was interred in the chancel of the church on 20 March 1604–5, being called "one off the foure ffellowes of ye colledg"; and three days afterwards Mrs. Jane Dee, "wyffe to ye Righte Wor. John Dee", was buried.

=== Legacy ===
Carter's Answer to Bristow shows him to have been a man of learning and familiar with books. His co-fellow, John Buckley, near whom he was buried, in 1593 bequeathed him a copy of Tremellius's Bible, and Carter appraised Buckley's valuable library. Richard Hollinworth, in the following century, who had conversed with persons who knew Carter, says that he preached solidly and succinctly. Campion, referring to the ministers of the neighbourhood, singles out Carter as one that boasted much of his learning, and as one who laboured to win converts. Canon Raines says that it is "clear that Carter was a man of extensive reading, and wrote ably and strongly, though upon the whole temperately, against his subtle and harassing theological opponents. He thoroughly understood the points of difference between himself and them, and was not disposed to lessen their importance; but there is no evidence that he was a vain man, or that he boasted of his attainments, although he had to thank Cambridge and his own industry for possessing no mean store of learning". He was twice married, his first wife, "Eme", being buried in 1590; the second wife was one Alice ...., one of his executors. There were at least seven children of the first marriage, of whom Dorothy, Abraham, John, and Mary survived. Hollinworth says that the sons walked in the godly ways of their father. Abraham had property at Blackley, where the father frequently preached; he married and had a child baptised there in 1603, and was buried there in 1621. John, baptised at Manchester on 26 February 1580–1, became in 1606 vicar-choral of Christ Church, Dublin, and in the following year prebendary of St. Michan's in the same cathedral; but of the latter he was deprived by Archbishop Jones in 1613, when all record of him is lost. This apparently is the son Hollinworth refers to when he says that he was preferred to a bishopric in Ireland, and that he was noted for the number of persons whom he baptised. The name Oliver Carter occurs in the Irish Fasti in the following century.

== Sources ==
- Stanley Papers (Chetham Soc.), ii. 128–32;
- Cooper's Athenæ Cantabrigienses, ii. 394, 554;
- Mayor's St. John's, vol. i.;
- Raines's MSS. xxii. 54, 132, xxiv. 67, xxv. 164, xli. 103;
- Chetham Miscellany, v. 16–17 (Chetham Soc. vol. xcvi.);
- Strype's Annals, 8vo, II. 68, 546, 548, 710–11;
- Strype's Parker, ii. 12;
- Churton's Nowell, 253–5;
- Hollinworth's Mancuniensis, ed. 1839, pp. 87, 106–8;
- Hibbert-Ware's Foundations of Manchester, i. 87, 106–8;
- J. E. Bailey's Dee's Diary, 4to, pp. 24, 80;
- Grosart's Account of the Executors of Robert Nowell, 169–70; 256–7;
- Duchy Calendar, iii. 4, 237, 286;
- Booker's History of the Ancient Chapel of Blackley, pp. 47, 64–6.

== Bibliography ==
- Bailey, John Eglington (1887). "Carter, Oliver" . In Stephen, Leslie (ed.). Dictionary of National Biography. Vol. 9. London: Smith, Elder & Co. pp. 203–205.
