= Cyril Benoni Holman Hunt =

British agriculturist and entomologist

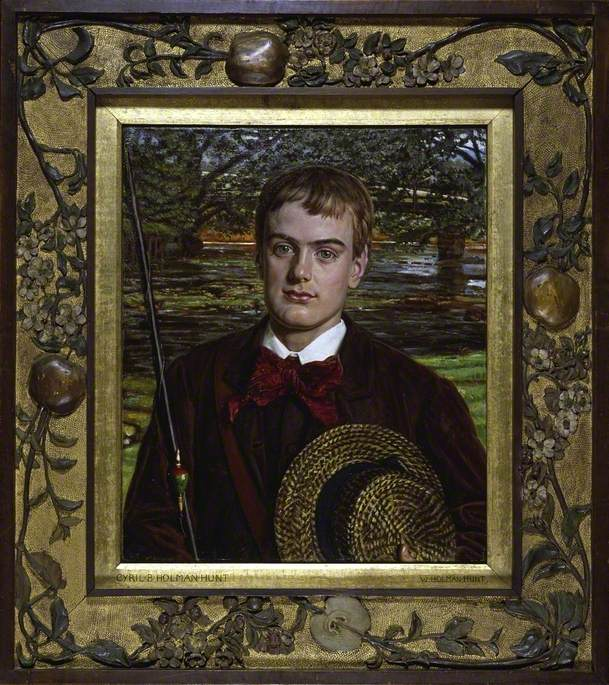
Painting of Cyril Benoni Holman Hunt by his father William Holman Hunt (1880)

Cyril Benoni Holman Hunt (27 October 1866 – 25 July 1934) was a tea planter, agriculturalist and entomologist, and the eldest son of William Holman Hunt, an English painter, and one of the three founding members of the Pre-Raphaelite Brotherhood.

== Early life and education ==
Holman Hunt was born in Florence, Italy on 27 October 1866. Within a few weeks his mother Fanny died from complications relating to the birth, and his father decided to give him the middle name "Benoni" meaning "son of sorrow" in Hebrew.

He spent much of his childhood living with his grandparents in Paddington, London whilst his father frequently travelled in connection with his work. When his father wedded Fanny's sister in 1875, Holman-Hunt suffered from resentment from his step-mother who was jealous of his relationship with his father.

He was educated at Summerfields in Oxford, Harrow, and St. John's College, Cambridge. His first job was as an engineer but he soon left and attended medical school for three years followed by a year working as a doctor at St. Thomas's Hospital in London.

== Career ==
In 1890, much to the disappointment of his father, he resigned his position at the hospital and sought work abroad, finding employment in Ceylon (now Sri Lanka) on a tea plantation with Eastern Produce and Estate Company. After a few years, he left and joined another tea plantation, the Meddecombra Estate in Dimbula, where he worked for 11 years as assistant manager before he accepted employment with Labukella and Rothschild.

In 1902, he departed Ceylon having received an offer to work as estate manager at Finlay, Muir & Co. in Travancore, southern India, where he remained for three years.

In 1905, he decided to try his luck in the rubber industry which was experiencing rapid growth in the Malay Peninsula and travelled to Selangor of the Federated Malay States where he initially took up residence in Kuala Lumpur. After working on a rubber plantation for several years, he accepted the post of temporary curator at the Selangor State Museum before he joined the Malay Civil Service in 1909.

For the next 13 years, until his retirement in 1921, he worked as an entomologist in the Government's Agricultural Department, researching diseases affecting rubber trees.

== Retirement ==
Before returning to England he wrote a book, Indo-Malayan Musings in Verse, which was published in Kuala Lumpur in 1921, and included descriptions of the struggles experienced by young, foreign planters working in the East. Back in England he went to live in Dorset, and died in Bridport in 1934 following an operation, aged 67, and was cremated at Golders Green, London. He never married.
