= Donald Alexander (filmmaker) =

British filmmaker

Donald Alexander (1913–1993) was a British documentary film-maker who worked as producer, director, writer and editor of films documenting social and industrial conditions, most notably in the coal-mining industry, between the 1930s and 1970s. The movement of which he was part is now regarded as the golden age of British documentary. Its leading figures also included Paul Rotha, John Grierson, Edgar Anstey, Humphrey Jennings, Basil Wright and Arthur Elton.

== Biography ==
Alexander’s family came from Wick, in north-east Scotland, though he was educated in England, first at Shrewsbury School and then Cambridge University. In 1939 he married Slade-trained artist and illustrator Isabel Alexander and then, after their divorce in 1945, fellow film-maker Budge Cooper, with whom he collaborated over many years.

In 1936, on the strength of an amateur film of miners in the Rhondda Valley, he was taken on by Paul Rotha at Strand films. He made films for Strand, Films of Fact and the Ministry of Information before leading a group of younger documentarists away from the big names in documentary and setting up the independent co-operative film unit DATA (Documentary and Allied Films Alliance), which he chaired for several years. Many of DATA’s commissions came from the National Coal Board (NCB), which was established in 1947 to run the newly-nationalised mining industry. Film was by then so useful to industries such as this for technical training and information exchange as well as entertainment, that in 1953 the NCB agreed to the establishment of an in-house film unit, which Alexander was invited to set up and which he led until 1963. Patrick Russell, head of documentary film at the British Film Institute, rates the NCB Film Unit as one of the world’s biggest and best industrial film units, and Donald Alexander as ‘arguably the key figure in the story of coal on film'. It produced a remarkable body of work – some 900 films in all, including the fabled cine-magazine Mining Review – before closing in 1984, the year of the bitter but unsuccessful campaign to prevent Prime Minister Margaret Thatcher from closing down large numbers of collieries as a prelude to the demise of the entire UK mining industry.

Technically polished and visually arresting, especially in black and white, the films of Alexander and his colleagues provide not just technical support but also a remarkably detailed visual history of the rise and decline of the post-war mining industry, and of the communities from which the miners came. Taken together with Alexander’s films in other fields they both meet the informational and technical needs for which they were commissioned and provide a powerful, reformist and sometimes polemical commentary on social and economic conditions in Britain before, during and after the Second World War.

== Filmography ==
Alexander’s 100 or so film credits include:

- Rhondda (1936)
- Today We Live (1937)
- Eastern Valley (1937)
- Dundee (1937)
- Wealth of a Nation (1938)
- Our School (1941)
- Five and Under (1941)
- Defeat Diphtheria (1941)
- Land Girl (1942)
- West Indies Calling (1944)
- Children of the City (1944)
- Cotton Come-Back (1946)
- The Bridge (1946)
- All Eyes on Britain (1947)
- Here’s Health (1948)
- Scottish Universities (1948)
- Plan for Coal (1952)
- Miner’s Window (1953)
- The Big Meeting (1963)
- Tayside (1974)
- Mining Review (especially 1947–50 and 1963)

Together with numerous NCB films between 1948 and 1971 and films commissioned by Films of Scotland, which he later chaired (1973–81).

== Sources ==
- Alexander, Isabel and Alexander, Donald, edited by Robin Alexander (2024) Rhondda Portraits, Grey Mare Press.
- Atken, I. (2006) ‘Donald Alexander’ in Encyclopedia of the Documentary Film, Routledge.
- "Donald Alexander: Film Credits". British Film Institute. Archived from the original on 2009-09-07.
- "NCB Film Unit (1952–84)". BFI Screenonline. British Film Institute. Archived from the original on 2016-08-02.
- British Film Institute, Mining Review,
- Cranston, R. When Coal Was King, British Film Institute, https://www.bfi.org.uk/features/when-coal-was-king
- British Film Institute, Land of Promise: the British Documentary Movement, 1930–1950 (DVD box set with text).
- Hardy, F. (1993), ‘Donald Alexander: documentary maker’, The Scotsman, 24 July
- Hogenkamp, B. (1991) The British Documentary Movement and the 1945–51 Labour Government, PhD thesis, CNAA.
- Hogenkamp, B. (1986) Deadly Parallels: film and the Left in Britain, 1929–39, Lawrence and Wishart.
- McBain, J. and Cowle, K. (1997) With an Eye to the Future: Donald Alexander and Budge Cooper, Scottish Screen Publications.
- Obituary: Donald Alexander, The Independent, 26.7.93
- Obituary: Donald Alexander, The Guardian, 30.7.93
- Obituary: Donald Alexander, The Times, 6.8.93
- Russell, P. "Donald Alexander (1913–1993)". BFI Screenonline. British Film Institute. Archived from the original on 2016-08-02.
- Russell, P. Born in 1913: six filmmakers’ centenaries, British Film Institute, https://www.bfi.org.uk/features/born-1913-6-filmmakers-centenaries
