= Haslefoot Bridges =

English Puritan minister

Haslefoot Bridges (died about 1677) was an English Anglican Puritan minister, who was ejected from his position at St Alban, Wood Street in the Great Ejection of 1662. Later, his name was listed in the Declaration of Indulgence (1672) signifying that he was licensed to preach as a Presbyterian minister. His home was listed as Enfield, Middlesex. However, the Declaration was withdrawn a year later.

Bridges studied at St. John's College, Cambridge and was described as "much admired, though of a reserved disposition."

Bridges was a signatory to "A seasonable exhortation of sundry ministers in London" and "To the Christian reader, especially heads of families" the latter being a document attached to the Westminster Standards.
