= Isabel Alexander =

British artist and illustrator

Isabel Alexander (1910–1996) was a British artist and illustrator whose work encompassed drawing, water colour, oils, lithography, lino-printing and three-dimensional work, and whose output ranged from socially-engaged documentation of the lives and work of Welsh coalminers, Irish fishermen and English farmworkers through book illustration to landscapes, seascapes and abstracts. Like many other women artists of her generation she struggled during her lifetime for opportunity and recognition in a field that was overwhelmingly male and her significance has only belatedly begun to be acknowledged.

== Biography ==
Born in Birmingham, Alexander attended King Edward's High School for Girls before training first at Birmingham School of Art (1929–33) and then the Slade School of Fine Arts in London (1934–35), where she won a prize for life drawing. In 1939 she married the Scottish documentary film director Donald Alexander. The couple separated in 1941 after the birth of their son, propelling Isabel Alexander into a decade of financial hardship and lone parenting aggravated by the privations of the war years. Despite this, she managed to combine part-time teaching with working as an art director on documentary, educational, medical and information films and undertaking various book illustration projects and commissions.

In Alexander's early work drawing was paramount, and after her time in documentary film it provided the impetus for an alternative documentary response to people and conditions in the South Wales coalfield during the wartime years before nationalisation, a project in which she was encouraged by film-maker Paul Rotha. Some of the striking portraits and landscapes from her extended visits to Rhondda in 1943, 1944 and 1945 appeared as illustrations to Miner's Day by B. L. Coombes and publications on post-war social and industrial reconstruction. After this, and exploiting her extensive botanical knowledge, she consolidated her work as an illustrator. She wrote and autolithographed The Story of Plant Life, one of the celebrated Puffin Picture Books, and embarked on a range of other illustration projects, developing her lithographic skill with the help of Barnett Freedman.

In 1949 Alexander at last gained financial security as a trainer of art teachers at Saffron Walden Teachers' Training College, and was able to move from work undertaken in part to make ends meet to a succession of phases of creative experimentation. While never forsaking line, she turned from illustration to paint, colour and form on a larger scale, and during the next forty years produced distinctive and often dramatic landscapes and seascapes interspersed by portraiture and forays into abstraction. The result was an impressive and remarkably varied body of sketches, studies, drawings, paintings and prints.

Alexander travelled extensively in Britain and continental Europe, though during the latter part of her life spent more and more time in Scotland's Hebridean islands. After attending the London International Surrealist Exhibition in 1936 and Hitler's notorious Exhibition of 'Degenerate Art' in Munich in 1937, she became an avid and lifelong exhibition-goer, retaining a strong international outlook and a particular interest in European and American modernism. The sheer variety of her work, and the influences she documented in her publication Sources of 20th Century Art, run counter to later attempts to pigeon-hole her as a typical small-scale English landscape painter.

During her lifetime there were 36 public exhibitions of Alexander's work, 27 of them joint and nine solo. Most of her works are in private collections, mainly in Britain but also in Australia, the United States and China. There are also public holdings at the Glynn Vivian Art Gallery in Swansea, the Mercer Art Gallery in Harrogate, Tullie House Museum and Art Gallery in Carlisle, the University of Cambridge and – as result of her submissions to the Pictures for Schools exhibitions at the Royal Academy during the 1960s and 1970s – several schools and local councils.

In 2017, three events combined to renew and extend interest in Alexander's work: a major biographical and artistic book-length study by Janet McKenzie; a retrospective exhibition at the Mercer Gallery in Harrogate, and the addition of images of over 70 of her works to the Bridgeman Images international on-line art library. In 2022, her Rhondda mining portraits featured in the exhibition Art and Industry: stories from South Wales at the Glynn Vivian Gallery in Swansea. Other exhibitions are currently being planned.

In 2021, over 70 of Alexander’s Rhondda drawings, lithographs and paintings were brought together for a new edition of the B.L.Coombes classic Miner’s Day (for which she had provided the original illustrations in 1945). In the new book, edited and introduced by Peter Wakelin, Coombes’s text and Alexander’s images are given equal treatment. Many of the 1940s Rhondda images were featured in the 2024 book Rhondda Portraits, this time in combination with a 1944 commentary by Donald Alexander which was discovered only recently in his archive at the National Library of Scotland.

== Publications ==
- Alexander, Isabel and Alexander, Donald, edited by Robin Alexander (2024) Rhondda Portraits, Grey Mare Press.
- Coombes, B.L., with Rhondda images by Isabel Alexander, edited by Peter Wakelin (2021) Miner's Day. Cardigan, Parthian Press.
- Alexander, Isabel (1996) Sources of 20th Century Art. Mimeo.
- Alexander, Isabel (1947) Comment Vivent les Plantes. Paris: Collection du Vieux Chamois.
- Alexander, Isabel (1946), The Story of Plant Life. London: Puffin Picture Books.
- Durham University History Department, illustrated by Isabel Alexander (1946), ‘Coal: the national black spot’, Future Books 1.
- Coombes, B.L., illustrated by Isabel Alexander (1945), Miner’s Day. London: Penguin
