= Eric James Denton =

British marine biologist

Eric Denton
- Born: Eric James Denton; 30 September 1923; Bentley, Yorkshire, England
- Died: 2 January 2007 (aged 77); St. Just, Cornwall
- Occupation: Marine Biologist
- Awards: Frink Medal (1987); Royal Medal (1987); International Prize for Biology (1989)

Sir Eric James Denton CBE FRS (30 September 1923 – 2 January 2007) was a British marine biologist who won the Royal Society's Royal Medal in 1987.

Denton was born in Bentley, South Yorkshire. He was educated at Doncaster Grammar School and St John's College, Cambridge, where he graduated with an Ordinary degree in Physics, before pursuing biophysics research at University College London. He was subsequently a lecturer in Physiology at the University of Aberdeen, and then a physiologist at the Marine Biological Association Laboratory in Plymouth. From 1974 to 1987 he was the Director of the Marine Biological Association Laboratory.

Denton died in St Just, Cornwall on 2 January 2007.
