= Mining Review =

British mining newsreel

Mining Review titles, 1954.

Mining Review was a newsreel of the British coal industry commissioned by the National Coal Board which ran from 1947 to 1983. It was renamed Review in September 1972 when its frequency was reduced from monthly to bi-monthly. At its peak it was seen by 12 million people at 700 British cinemas, mainly in mining areas. Its final and 420th edition was produced in March 1983.
