= Bissell (surname) =

Bissell is a surname deriving from the Middle English "buyscel", meaning "measure of grain", as well as the Yiddish "Bissel" and "Biselman". Respelling of German "Biesel". Notable persons with that name include:

- A. Keith Bissell (born 1941), American politician
- Anna Sutherland Bissell (1846–1934), American manufacturing businesswoman
- Arthur D. Bissell (1844–1926), American transport businessman and banker
- Austin Bissell (died 1807), British Captain in the Royal Navy
- Bert Bissell (1902–1998), English mountain climber and peace activist
- Clark Bissell (1782–1857), American judge and politician, governor of Connecticut
- Claude Bissell (1916– 2000), Canadian author and educator
- Clayton Lawrence Bissell (1896–1972), American soldier
- Daniel Bissell (disambiguation), several people
- Emily Bissell (1861–1948), American social worker and activist
- Emma Bissell (born 2001), English footballer
- Frank Bissell (disambiguation), multiple people
- Gene Bissell (1926–2016), American football player and coach
- George Bissell (industrialist) (1821–1884), American oil businessman
- George Edwin Bissell (1839–1920), American sculptor
- Hezekiah Bissell (1835–1928), American civil engineer
- Israel Bissell (1752–1823), American post rider
- James D. Bissell (born 1952), American art director
- Jean Galloway Bissell (1936–1990), American judge and attorney
- John Winslow Bissell (born 1940), American judge and attorney
- Keith Bissell (1912–1992), Canadian composer, conductor, and music educator
- Laura Bissell (born 1983), English road and track racing cyclist
- Melville Reuben Bissell (1843–1889), American entrepreneur and inventor
- Mina Bissell, Iranian-American biologist
- Nicholas L. Bissell Jr. (1947–1996), American prosecutor
- Patrick Bissell (1957–1987), American dancer
- Peter Bissell (1986–2007), English road and track racing cyclist
- Raymond Ward Bissell (1936–2019), American art historian
- Richard M. Bissell Jr. (1910–1994), American spy and intelligence officer
- Richard Pike Bissell (1913–1977), American author
- Silas Bissell (1942–2002), American activist
- Stanley Bissell (1906–1999), English wrestler
- Susan Bissell (21st century), UNICEF's Child Protection Section chief
- Tom Bissell (born 1974), American journalist, critic, and fiction writer
- Whit Bissell (1909–1996), American actor
- William Bissell (disambiguation), several people
- Wilson S. Bissell (1847–1903), American politician from New York

== See also ==
- Bissell (disambiguation)
