= Bussell (surname) =

Bussell is a surname. Notable people with the Bussel or Bussell surnames include:

- The Bussell family, early settlers in Western Australia
  - John Bussell (1803–1875), of the Bussell family
  - Alfred Bussell (1816–1882), of the Bussell family
- Darcey Bussell (born 1969), English ballerina
- Gerry Bussell (born 1943), American football player
- Harold Busséll, American pastor and author
- Nick Bussell (born 1983), American racing driver
- Norm Bussell (born 1945), Australian rules footballer
- Rachel Kramer Bussel (born 1975), American author, columnist, and editor

== See also ==
- Bissell (surname)
- Bussell (disambiguation)
