= Bissell (disambiguation) =

Bissell is a manufacturer of vacuum cleaners and other floor care products.

Bissell may also refer to:

- Bissell, New Jersey, United States, unincorporated community
- Bissell (surname), people with the surname Bissell
- Bissel bogie or Bissel axle (sometimes spelt Bissell), a type of locomotive wheelset
- Bissell (cycling team), American professional road cycling team
- Bissell Tower, a historic standpipe water tower in College Hill, St. Louis

== See also ==
- Bissel (disambiguation)
- Bissell Bridge (disambiguation)
