= City of Death (novel) =

2016 Indian crime novel by Abheek Barua

- Author: Abheek Barua
- Language: English
- Genre: Crime fiction
- Publisher: Juggernaut Books
- Publication date: 2016
- Publication place: India
- Pages: 263
- ISBN: 978-81-9323-721-2

City of Death is a 2016 Indian English-language crime novel written by Abheek Barua and published by Juggernaut Books. It is set in Kolkata and follows Sohini Sen, a female police officer who is reinstated from a bureaucratic posting to investigate the murder of a young woman from a prominent family. The novel was initially published under the title The Beheading before being retitled. It is Barua's debut work of fiction.

== Plot ==
On a monsoon afternoon, a young woman named Ahona Chatterjee from a well-connected Kolkata family is found brutally murdered. Her father uses his political connections to have the case assigned to Sohini Sen, a senior crime-branch officer who had previously been sidelined due to her involvement in a high-profile investigation and has since struggled with alcoholism and depression. Assisted by Arjun Sinha, Sen investigates a case entangled in corruption, political interference, and the private lives of the victim's family. The novel's backdrop of Kolkata, its politics, media, and social strata, forms a central element of the story alongside the criminal investigation.

== Background and publication ==
Barua, who had worked in the financial sector for over two decades and was serving as Chief Economist of HDFC Bank at the time of publication, had been a reader of crime fiction for many years before writing the novel. He cited Nordic crime writers and British authors Ian Rankin and Kate Atkinson as literary influences.

The book was initially released under the title The Beheading. Following reader feedback, which indicated that the story was as much about Kolkata and its social character as it was about the crime itself, the title was changed to City of Death. The novel was published by Juggernaut Books and was one of the publisher's early releases.

== Reception ==
Writing in Deccan Chronicle, the reviewer described the novel as a "nerve-racking account" of a murder investigation that illuminates the darker aspects of the city and the human mind, distinguishing it from conventional crime fiction through its attention to Kolkata's social and political textures.

Livemint reviewed the novel, examining its place within the emerging tradition of Indian urban crime fiction and its treatment of Kolkata as both setting and subject.

Hindustan Times carried two separate reviews of the novel. One described it as a "mysterious crime thriller exploring the human mind", and another assessed Barua's debut as a work that used the conventions of the police procedural to examine contemporary Indian society.

HuffPost India reviewed the novel under the headline "City of Death: A Kolkata Chiaroscuro of Crime", framing it as an atmospheric noir whose power lay in its portrait of the city as much as in its plot.

In a 2017 essay for Scroll.in on Indian urban crime fiction, the novel was cited alongside works by Jerry Pinto and Anita Nair as part of a wave of novels using the crime genre to explore the social fabric and decay of Indian cities. The essay described City of Death as a "gory thriller" in which Kolkata itself functions as a central presence, the city's dysfunction and political corruption acting as both backdrop and driver of the investigation.

Writing in World Literature Today, critic J. Madison Davis included the novel in a 2017 survey of Indian crime fiction, describing it as a thriller with global potential in the tradition of Jeffery Deaver, and noting that it brought urban noir fully to a Kolkata setting for an international audience.

India Today included the novel in a roundup of recent Indian serial-killer fiction titled "Blood on the Page", describing it concisely as a Kolkata-set thriller in which an alcoholic female cop confronts a ruthless killer while battling her own demons and institutional resistance.

ThinkerViews praised the novel's atmospheric writing but drew comparisons to other works in the thriller genre, noting that the killer's psychological profile echoed elements from Dan Brown's Angels & Demons and Robert Galbraith's Career of Evil.
