= Watershed 1967 =

Military book

Watershed 1967: India’s Forgotten Victory over China
- First edition
- Author: Probal DasGupta
- Language: English
- Genre: Nonfiction
- Publisher: Juggernaut Books
- Publication date: 17 February 2020
- Publication place: India
- Media type: Paperback, E-book, Print (hardcover)
- Pages: 309
- ISBN: 9789353450939

Watershed 1967: India's Forgotten Victory over China is a book by Probal Dasgupta, a former Indian army veteran. The book was published by Juggernaut Books and was released in February 2020. The book narrates the accounts of the events during 1967 when the troops from India and China clashed at the heights of Cho La and Nathu La at the Sikkim border and the events following after it.

== Overview ==
The book provides descriptive accounts of the period after the first India-China War in 1962, leading to the India-Pakistan war in 1965. The narrative extends to the period after 1967, which includes the events leading to the India-Pakistan war in 1971, along with the impact and repercussions in history on relations between India and China.

The book mentions the various standoffs between India and China in the last 50 years, including the Sumdorung Chu in 1987, Depsang, Dault Beg Oldi, and Doklam in 2017 besides also describing other key events, military and political leadership issues, their significance and impact on India's international relations, especially with China.

== Reception ==
The book has been reviewed and featured in mainstream media by The Telegraph (India), Business Standard, and The Hindu, Outlook, and Mathrubhumi. The book also appeared at the Military Literature Festival in Chandigarh in Dec 2020.

Shekhar Gupta, an Indian Author and a Journalist, described it as “[An] engagingly written page-turner of a book… a valuable addition to the still thin genre of military biography in India” while Husain Haqqani, Author of India vs. Pakistan, said that the book “Sheds light on little known facts…” and is “…critical for anyone following the India-China competition”.

The book received the attention of the Former Retired Air Vice Marshal Arjun Subramaniam, the author of India's Wars, who praised the book for being “Well-researched…” and added that, “DasGupta is a gifted storyteller with a real feel for battle.”

Oxford historian and China scholar Rana Mitter wrote that the book makes a convincing case that the Indian victory in 1967 forced China to rethink its approach, which ultimately shaped the subcontinent, and that it helps explain why the rift between India and China has not healed. He described DasGupta's prose as "full of clipped emotion".

The rights for the book were acquired by Story Ink, a Mumbai-based books-to-film agency that hopes to create a film based on it in the near future with the partnership of Vikram Lamba of Bion Films.
