= Wow! Momo =

Indian quick-service restaurant

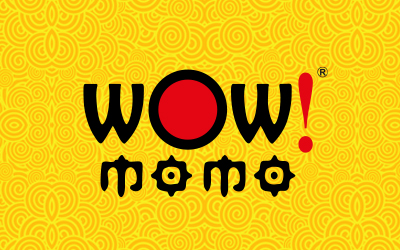
- Type: Private
- Industry: Food and beverage Fast food restaurants
- Founded: August 2008; 18 years ago
- Founder: Sagar J. Daryani; Binod K. Homagai; Shah M. Rahman - Co-founder; L Muralikrishnan - Co-founder
- Headquarters: Kolkata, West Bengal, India
- Number of locations: 30 cities
- Area served: India
- Key people: Sagar J Daryani (CEO); Binod K. Homagai (COO); Shah Miftaur Rahman (CFO); Muralikrishnan L (CMO); Mithun Appaiah (CEO - FMCG)
- Products: Momo; Burger; Dessert
- Revenue: ▲₹450 Crores (FY 2023 (est))
- Number of employees: 6000
- Parent: Wow! Momo Foods Private Limited
- Website: https://www.wowmomo.com/

Wow! Momo is an Indian chain of fast food restaurants headquartered in Kolkata. The chain specializes in momo (specifically Nepali Mo:Mo), momo-filled burgers (MoBurgs) and momo-based desserts. It was established in 2008 by St. Xavier's College alumni Sagar Daryani and Binod Homagai.

As of December 2021, there are around 425 outlets across 19 cities in India. Wow! Momo Foods Pvt. Ltd. operates 3 Brands; Wow! Momo, Wow! China and Wow! Chicken which was launched in December 2021.

As per Fintrackr’s estimates, Wow! Momo in 2022 raised fresh investment in Series D round at a valuation of $270 million.

== History ==
The founders of Wow! Momo, Sagar Jagdish Daryani and Binod Kumar Homagai, first met each other at St. Xavier's College during their undergrad. With an initial amount of ₹30,000, they started the venture in 2008 at the age of 21. Wow! Momo began as a 6' by 6' kiosk in a Spencer's, which was one of their initial stores (the other one being a kiosk inside a Big Bazaar on rent for 18% of revenue share per month). They were later joined by another St. Xavier's alumnus and friend Shah Miftaur Rahman, and Muralikrishnan joined as the fourth co-founder in 2018.

Wow! Momo, in June 2017, managed to raise ₹44 crore from Lighthouse funds and through investments by Indian Angel Network. A year later, Fabindia's managing director, William Bissell, invested ₹3 crore (US$440,000) in the company, which helped Wow! Momo reach a valuation of ₹300 crore (US$45 million). And in September 2019, after an investment by Tiger Global Management of ₹130 crore (US$23 million), the valuation of the company crossed ₹860 crore (US$120 million), which led to the opening of more outlets in commercial locations like malls and tech parks.

During the COVID-19 pandemic, Wow! Momo entered into a strategic partnership with Café Coffee Day, in which they decided to share outlet space along with costs and revenue.

In January 2024, Wow! Momo raised approximately ₹410 crore in funding from Khazanah Nasional Berhad and Oaks Capital Management, bringing the company's valuation to over ₹2,400 crore.

In April 2024, Wow! Momo managed to raise $9 million (₹70 crore) from Z3 Partners.

== Controversies ==
In March 2023, in a trademark dispute, the Delhi High Court issued a prima facie injunction against the restaurant chain Wow Punjabi, temporarily restraining it from using a mark resembling that of Wow! Momo. The court acknowledged Wow! Momo's registered trademarks and market presence, noting Wow Punjabi’s failure to respond to cease and desist notices.

In January 2026, a major fire at a warehouse complex in Anandapur, Kolkata, resulted in the deaths of 50 people, including workers from multiple units; one of the affected facilities was a warehouse leased by Wow! Momo.
