= Akbar of Hindustan =

Book by Parvati Sharma

- Author: Parvati Sharma
- Language: English
- Subject: Akbar
- Genre: Biography, Non-fiction
- Published: 2022
- Publisher: Juggernaut Books
- Publication place: India
- Media type: Print
- Pages: 352
- ISBN: 978-93-91165-60-4

Akbar of Hindustan is a biography of Mughal emperor Akbar written by Indian author Parvati Sharma. Published in 2022 by Juggernaut Books, the book examines Akbar’s reign from 1556 to 1605, focusing on his political strategies, religious policies, and cultural contributions. The book received positive reviews for accessible prose and balanced perspective, with critics noting its contribution to popular historical writing on the Mughal Empire.

== Summary ==
The book chronicles Akbar’s life from his ascension to the Mughal throne at age 13 to his death in 1605. It covers his military campaigns to expand the empire, administrative reforms like the mansabdari system, and diplomatic alliances, including marriages with Rajput princesses. Sharma addresses the misconception that Akbar’s Rajput wife was “Jodha Bai,” identifying her as Harkha Bai and noting the absence of romantic details in historical records. Akbar’s religious initiatives, such as the establishment of the Ibadat Khana for interfaith debates and the promotion of Din-i-Ilahi, are discussed, alongside his patronage of art, literature, and architecture, including the Fatehpur Sikri complex. The narrative avoids modern labels like “secular” but analyses how Akbar’s policies fostered a multicultural empire.

== Development and release ==
Parvati Sharma, a Delhi-based historian and author of books like Jahangir: An Intimate Portrait of a Great Mughal, wrote Akbar of Hindustan to offer a nuanced perspective on Akbar’s legacy. The book draws on Mughal chronicles, court records, and secondary sources to correct popular myths, such as the romanticized portrayal of Akbar’s marriage. Sharma conducted research over several years, aiming to make the biography accessible to general readers while maintaining historical accuracy. Juggernaut Books announced the book in early 2022 and released it in print in June 2022. A digital version was made available later that year.

== Critical reception ==
Akbar of Hindustan was well-received by literary critics. Lakhamt R Hasan of Hindustan Times praised Sharma’s “lucid prose” and ability to depict Akbar’s complexities without idealizing him. Supriya Nair, writing for Scroll.in, noted that the book “presents its subject with all his ambiguities,” balancing Akbar’s tolerance with his military campaigns. The Hindu described it as a “vividly written” account that appeals to both scholars and general readers. Shireen Qudari of LiveMint commended Sharma’s use of primary sources, calling the book a “valuable addition to Mughal historiography.” Some reviewers suggested improvements. India Today noted that while the book is engaging, it prioritizes narrative flow over exhaustive historical analysis, which might disappoint academic readers. The Indian Express observed that Sharma’s focus on Akbar’s public life leaves less room for his personal relationships, such as those with his family.
