= Chiki Sarkar =

Indian book publisher (born 1977)

- Born: Calcutta, India (now Kolkata, West Bengal)
- Occupation: Publisher
- Years active: 1998–present
- Parent: Aveek Sarkar (father)
- Website: juggernaut.in

Chiki Sarkar is a book publisher from Kolkata born in 1979. She is the lead founder of Juggernaut Books.

== Background ==
Chiki Sarkar was born into a Bengali family, the daughter of Aveek Sarkar, a journalist proprietor, and his wife Rakhi Sarkar. Aveek Sarkar belongs to the family which runs the Kolkata-based Ananda Bazaar Patrika Media Group, which was first founded in 1876.

== Career ==
She started her career in publishing with the London-based company Bloomsbury Publishing.She worked there for seven years, and later moved to Delhi in 2006, and joined Random House. In 2011, Chiki Sarkar became the publisher at Penguin Books India. In 2013, publishers Penguin Books and Random House merged and Sarkar was made the India publishing head. Two years later, in 2015, she set up her own publishing company Juggernaut Books.

A World Economic Forum Young Global Leader, Sarkar is also a Fortune India's Most Powerful Women, Forbes 2018 W-power trailblazers and Economic Times's Rising Women Leaders of 2015.

=== Career timeline ===
- Bloomsbury Publishing 1999–2006
- Random House 2006–2011 founding publisher
- Penguin Books India 2011–2013
- Penguin Random House 2013–2015
- Juggernaut Books founder-publisher 2015–present

== Juggernaut Books ==
In 2015, Sarkar set up her own publication house, Juggernaut Books, a publishing company with its own app. Juggernaut's investors include Nandan Nilekani, Neeraj Aggarwal and Bharti Airtel.

The Juggernaut app has its own writing platform for amateur writers to upload their stories directly.

Juggernaut has published books written by the following authors:

- Abhijit Banerjee, Esther Duflo
- William Dalrymple
- Arundhati Roy
- Aditya Tiwari
- Nandini Sundar
- Perumal Murugan
- Shyam Saran
- Manu S. Pillai
- Rajdeep Sardesai
- Sourav Ganguly
- Twinkle Khanna
- Sunny Leone
- Yasser Usman
- Rajat Gupta
- Abdullah Khan Abdullah Khan, author of ‘Patna Blues’, on his long struggle to become a writer
- Tony Joseph
- Anirban Mahapatra
- Umar Khalid
