= Bissel =

Bissel may refer to:

- Bissel bogie or Bissel axle (sometimes spelt Bissell), a type of steam locomotive wheelset
- Bissel (Greyhawk), the fictitious Dungeons and Dragons state

== See also ==
- Bissell (disambiguation)
