= William Bissell =

William Bissell may refer to:

- William Henry Bissell (1811–1860), governor of the U.S. state of Illinois
- William G. Bissell (1857–1925), member of the Wisconsin State Senate
- William Nanda Bissell (born 1966), Indian businessman and the chairman of Fabindia
