= Bussell =

Bussell may refer to:

- Bussell (surname), a surname (including a list of people with the name)
- Bussell Highway, a road in Western Australia
- Bussell Island, an island in Tennessee of archaeological importance
