= Anirban Mahapatra =

Indian microbiologist

- Education: Ohio State University (Masters); Ohio State University (PhD)
- Occupations: microbiologist; author; editor

Anirban Mahapatra is an Indian American microbiologist and the chief science and global strategy officer of the American Society for Microbiology (ASM) . Earlier he was editorial director. He is the author of two popular science books. Earlier, he led an editorial team at the American Chemical Society (ACS).

== Education and career ==
Mahapatra has a Masters and a PhD in microbiology from The Ohio State University. He launched several scientific journals while at ACS.

Mahapatra has written a popular science column for The Hindustan Times, a leading Indian national daily newspaper since 2021. His science columns have also been published by The Morning Context.

== Publications ==
Mahapatra has written a couple of popular science books:

- COVID-19:Separating Fact from Fiction published by Penguin Random House India.
- When the Drugs Don't Work: The Hidden Pandemic That Could End Modern Medicine published by Juggernaut Books.

Sukumar Ranganathan reviewed COVID-19:Separating Fact from Fiction in The Hindustan Times. Devangshu Datta reviewed it in the Business Standard. Ranjona Banerji reviewed the book in The Asian Age.

Sucheta Dasgupta reviewed When the Drugs Don't Work: The Hidden Pandemic That Could End Modern Medicine in The Asian Age. Soma Das reviewed the book in The Financial Express. The book featured in an India Today podcast.
