= Bissell Street Water Tower =

- U.S. National Register of Historic Places
- St. Louis Landmark
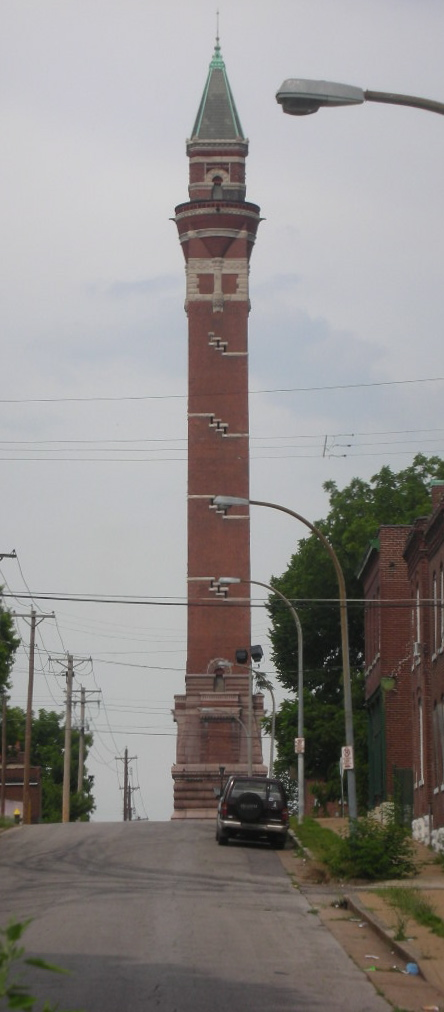

- Location within St. Louis Location within Missouri Location within the United States
- Location: Jct. of Bissell St. and Blair Ave., St. Louis, Missouri
- Coordinates: 38°40′13″N 90°12′21″W
- Area: less than one acre
- Built: 1885
- Architect: Eames, William S.
- NRHP reference No.: 70000906
- Added to NRHP: June 5, 1970

Bissell Street Water Tower (also known as the "New Red" tower) is a historic standpipe water tower located at the junction of Bissell Street and Blair Avenue in St. Louis, Missouri. The tower was completed in 1886 and was in service until 1912. It is one of three remaining historic standpipes in Saint Louis, along with the Grand Avenue Water Tower and the Compton Hill Water Tower.

== See also ==
- College Hill, St. Louis
- Chicago Water Tower
- Louisville Water Tower
- National Register of Historic Places listings in St. Louis north and west of downtown
