= Frank Bissell =

Frank Bissell may refer to:

- Frank Bissell (American football) (1902–1983)
- Frank Bissell (politician) (1878–1970), American politician from Iowa
- Frank S. Bissell (1913–2012), American wrestler
