= Grand Avenue Water Tower =

- U.S. National Register of Historic Places
- St. Louis Landmark
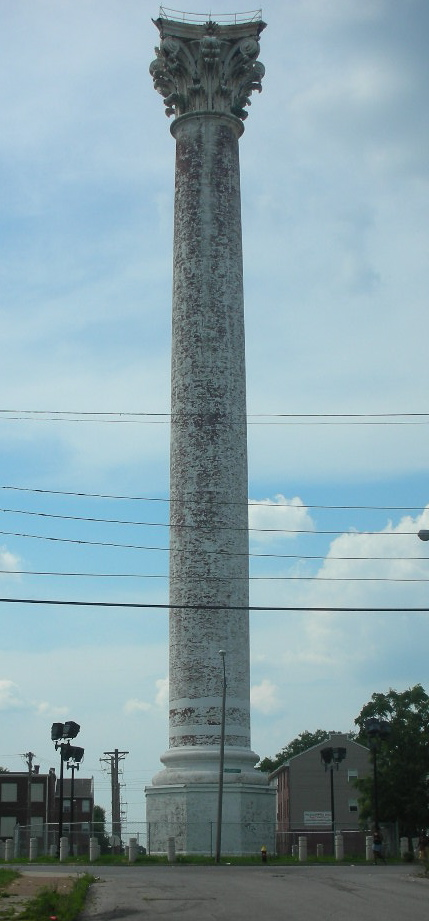
- Grand Avenue Water Tower
- Location: Intersection of E. Grand Blvd and 20th Street; St. Louis, Missouri
- Coordinates: 38°40′14.8″N 90°12′33.9″W
- Built: 1871
- Architect: George I. Barnett
- NRHP reference No.: 70000908
- Added to NRHP: April 20, 1970

The Grand Avenue Water Tower is a water tower located at the intersection of Grand Boulevard and 20th Street in the College Hill neighborhood of St. Louis, Missouri. It is the oldest extant water tower in St. Louis, pre-dating both the Bissell Street Water Tower and the Compton Hill Water Tower.

== History ==
The tower was built in 1871 by architect George I. Barnett in the form of a Corinthian order column with brick, stone and cast iron trim. Inclusive of its base, shaft and capital, it stands 154 feet (47 m) tall. Inside was a standpipe with a diameter of five feet, designed to hold water. In addition to being used for firefighting, the pressure in the pipe regulated water pressure in the area. In 1912, the water tower was decommissioned, and its standpipe and internal spiral staircase were removed. The staircase was replaced by a vertical ladder, and the tower was modified to include an aircraft warning light. In 1998, the water tower was restored and lit by floodlights.

The tower is the tallest free-standing Corinthian column in the world. At 46.94 metres (154.0 ft) it is much taller than the free-standing Corinthian columns Pompey's Pillar in Alexandria (20.46 metres (67.1 ft)) or the Column of the Goths in Istanbul (18.5 metres (61 ft)), or those in colonnades at the Temple of Jupiter at Baalbek which are 19.82 metres (65.0 ft) tall, the Temple of Mars Ultor in Rome at 17.74 metres (58.2 ft), and the Olympieion in Athens at 16.83 metres (55.2 ft).

== See also ==
- Architecture of St. Louis
- College Hill, St. Louis § Water Towers
- Compton Hill Reservoir Park
