= Henry Shaw (philanthropist) =

American philanthropist (1800–1889)

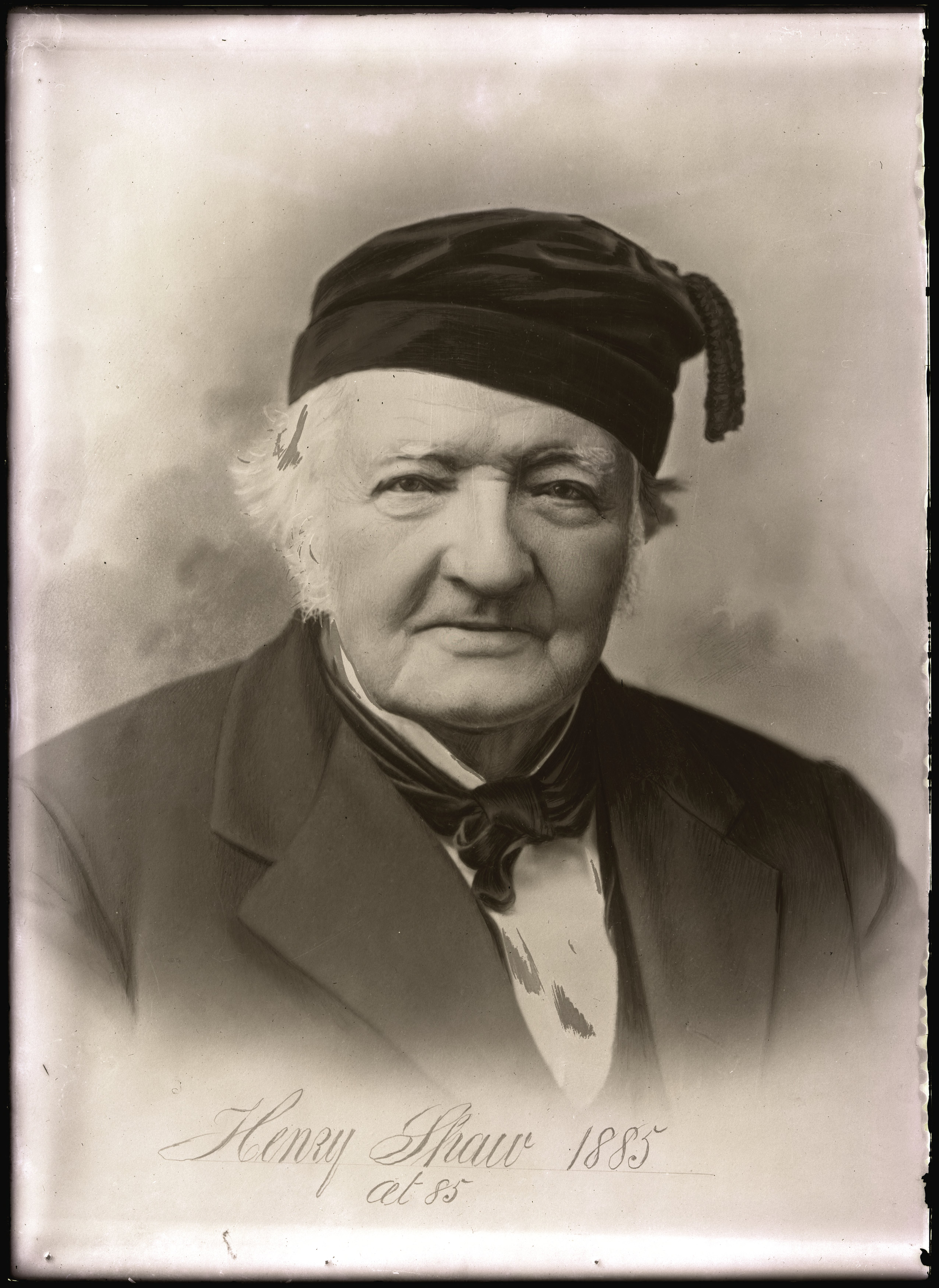
- Henry Shaw
- Born: July 24, 1800; Sheffield, England
- Died: August 25, 1889 (aged 89); St. Louis, Missouri
- Occupation: Businessman
- Known for: Founding the Missouri Botanical Garden

Henry Shaw (July 24, 1800 – August 25, 1889) was an American businessman, amateur botanist, and slave owner in St. Louis, Missouri, when it was a gateway city to the West. His businesses supplied residents, pioneers and others. Having made his fortune, he was able to retire at age 40, pursue his interest in botany, and used much of his fortune in philanthropy. He is best known as the founder of the Missouri Botanical Garden, but he also donated the land to the city for Tower Grove Park and oversaw its development. He donated funds to several other city institutions as well.

== Early life ==
Shaw was born on July 24, 1800, in Sheffield, England, which had been a center of iron and steel manufacturing. Henry’s father, Joseph Shaw, had moved to Sheffield as a young man to open his own iron factory, along with a partner. The firm manufactured grates, fire irons and so forth. Henry was the oldest of four children in the family. He had two sisters, Sarah and Caroline, and a brother who died in infancy. Shaw received his primary school education in the village of Thone near his home in Sheffield. When he was about ten or eleven, he was transferred to the Mill Hill School near London. He studied at this boarding school for about six years, before returning home to Sheffield in 1816 or 1817.

Shaw was taken out of school because of his father’s financial difficulties. While he had been away at school, his father’s business had come upon hard times. The family could no longer afford to send Henry to the expensive school with other children of the upper classes. But in his time at Mill Hill School, Shaw had gained the basic education of an English gentleman. He had studied the classics, learned some Latin and Greek, and studied French. He also studied mathematics and was introduced to the sciences. More importantly, he acquired the attitudes and outlook of an English gentleman, and a polish he would continue to have even after decades of life in the United States.

== Business career ==
On his return to Sheffield, Shaw began to assist his father with the business. Searching for new markets, the elder Shaw turned his sights on the vast markets of the Americas. Iron and steel manufacturing in the former colonies was not as advanced as in England, and Sheffield steel products were some of the finest in the world. In 1818, Henry accompanied his father on his first trip across the Atlantic Ocean, where the pair did business in Quebec, Canada. Young Henry must have impressed his father with his business acumen because the next year he was sent to New Orleans alone on business.

A shipment of goods to New Orleans had been lost or misplaced, and Shaw was sent to find the shipment. Although he recovered the goods, he could not find a buyer in New Orleans. Shaw turned to the interior of the country, determined to find a market for the goods. Vast territories of the American Midwest had been opened up in the previous decade by the Louisiana Purchase, which doubled the size of the United States. In about 1817, New Orleans had become the gateway to this area by the first steam-powered paddlewheel riverboat that made its way up the Mississippi River from the port of New Orleans.

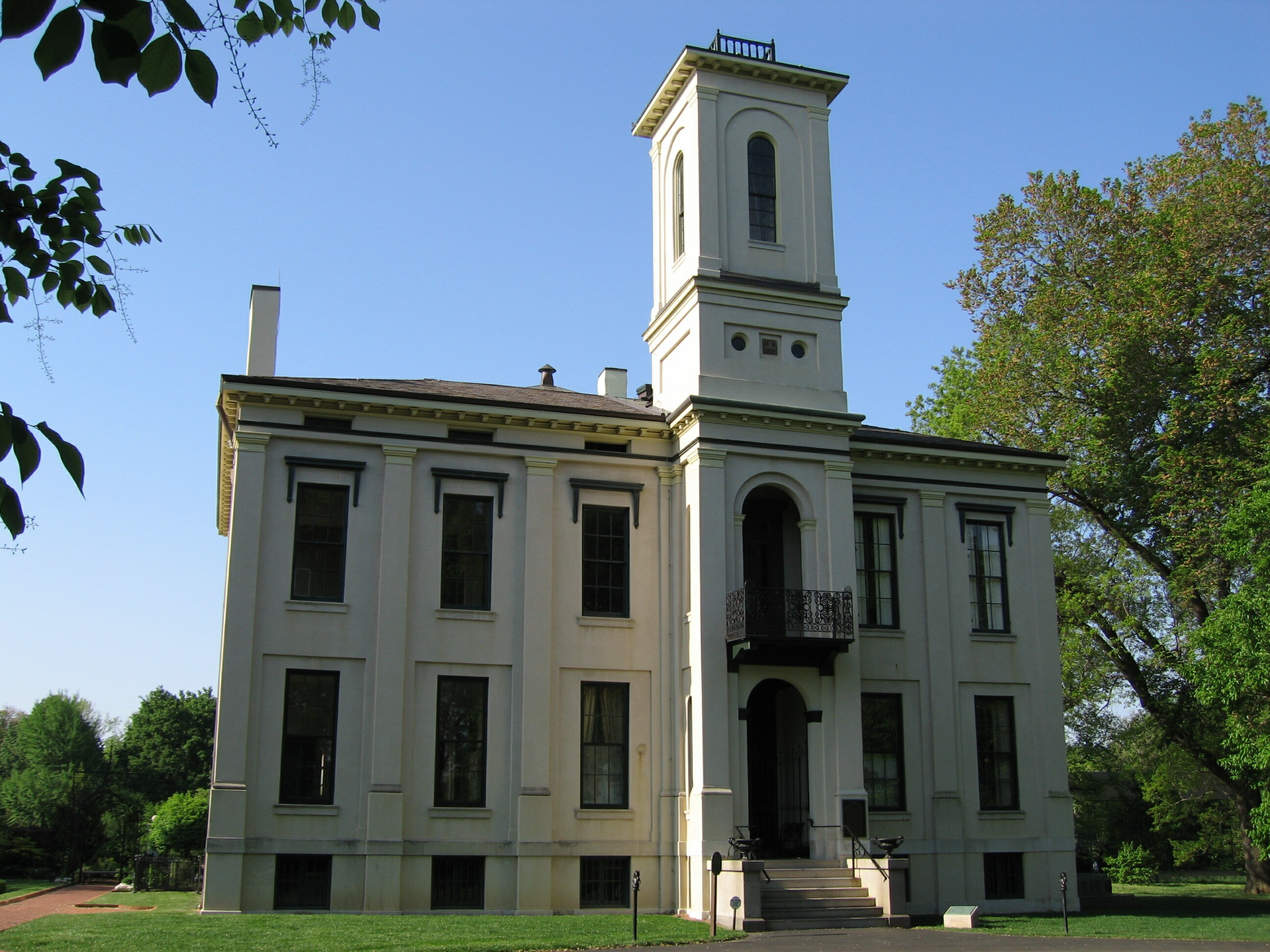
Henry Shaw's Tower Grove House, built in 1849.

In the Spring of 1819, Henry Shaw purchased passage for himself and his goods on a steamship called the Maid of Orleans. The trip, which took 40 days, cost Shaw $120. On May 3, 1819, Shaw landed in a small French village on the west side of the Mississippi called St. Louis. At the time, the village was about fifty years old. It ran about three blocks deep for about a mile along the bank of the river. Shaw set up a hardware store in St. Louis, selling high quality cutlery and other metal products. His first storefront was at Four North Main, on the west side of the street between Market and Chestnut. The goods were purchased by Shaw’s uncle, James Hoole, in Sheffield and shipped to St. Louis. Hoole also provided the initial capital for the business. It turned out to be a good investment, as it was a good time to be in the hardware business in St. Louis.

During the two decades Shaw operated his business, roughly 1819 to 1839, St. Louis grew quite rapidly. Shaw sold his goods to the people of St. Louis, to soldiers and farmers, and to the other new immigrants to the area. He also found a ready market in the pioneers making their way to the open lands of the West. Many of the pioneers moving westward were outfitted in St. Louis before moving West. Shaw carried the kind of hardware, tools and cutlery they would need to make the trip and set up a new homestead. As his business went well, he continued to buy land on the outskirts of the city.

=== Slave ownership ===
Missouri was a slave state, and Shaw acquired enslaved African Americans as workers by 1828 for his working farm land. He also had several slaves working as domestic servants. He owned as many as eleven slaves at a time. In June 2020, the Missouri Botanical Garden shared a Facebook post with the names of some of Shaw's slaves: Peach, Juliette, Bridgette, Joseph, Jim, Sarah, Tabitha and her daughter Sarah, Ester and her children. In 1855, four of Shaw’s slaves escaped but were caught as they crossed the Mississippi River. Esther and her children were trying to get to the free state of Illinois where they hoped to connect with helpers to travel further north on the Underground Railroad. Shaw consequently sold Esther south to Vicksburg, Mississippi, separating her from her children. A census record reveals that Shaw had eight slaves in 1860.

== Retirement ==
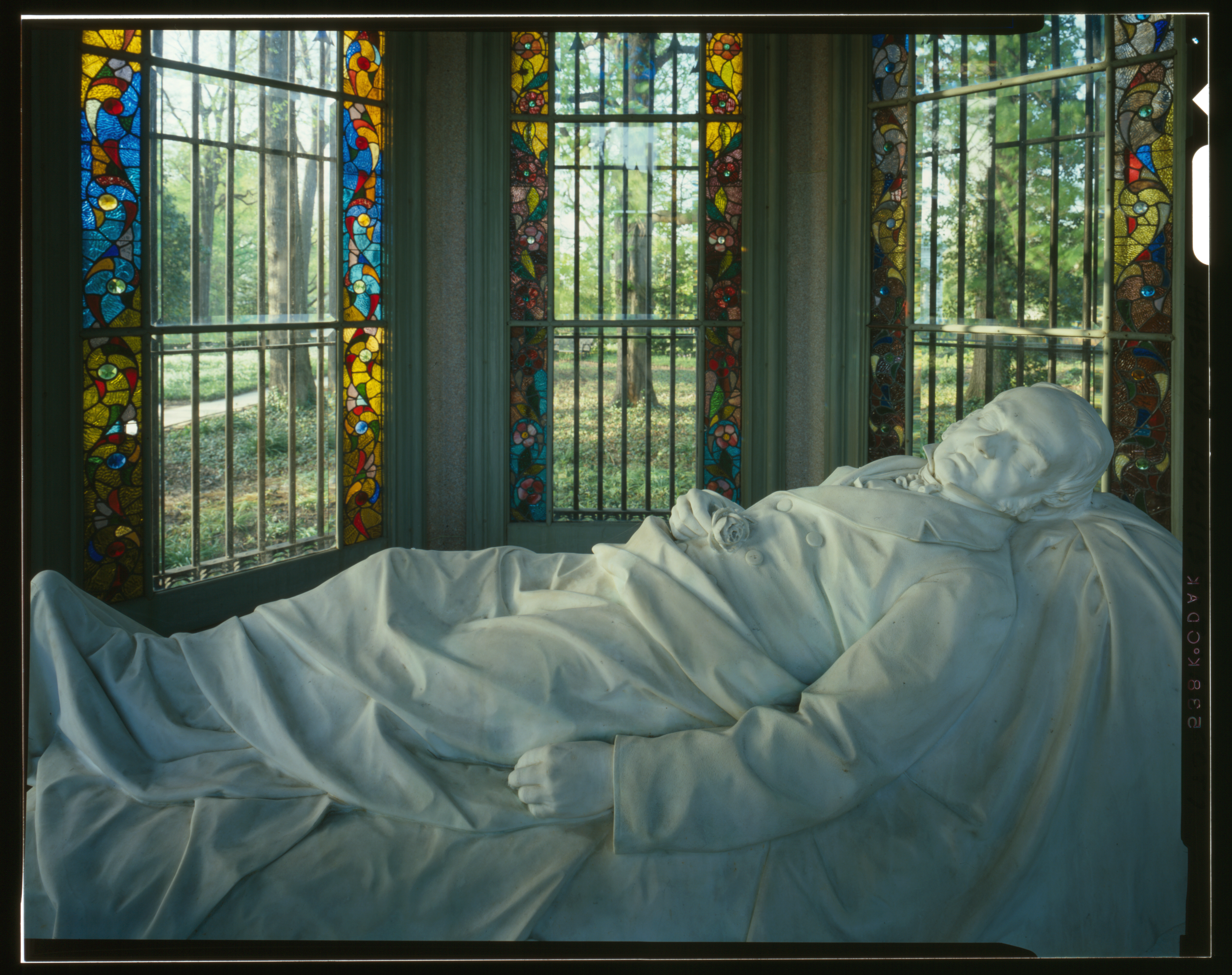
Henry Shaw mausoleum statue, Missouri Botanical Garden.

By the age of 40, Shaw was one of the largest landholders in the city and was able to retire. This gave him the freedom to travel and to pursue his great interest in botany. Following his retirement, Shaw travelled extensively for years. He returned to St. Louis in 1851. He engaged architect George I. Barnett (who later also designed Shaw's mausoleum) to design and build Tower Grove House, which became the center of his estate. Working with leading botanists, Shaw planned, funded and built what would become the Missouri Botanical Garden on the land around his home. As the garden became more extensive, Shaw decided to open it to the general public in 1859.

Shaw donated additional land adjoining the garden to the city of St. Louis for Tower Grove Park. He helped with its construction, including the pavilions and various works of art. He gave the city a school and land for a hospital. He endowed Washington University in St. Louis School of Botany, and helped found the Missouri Historical Society. Shaw died in 1889 and is buried in a mausoleum surrounded by a grove of trees on the grounds of the gardens he founded. He is widely remembered for his generosity and philanthropy. Over 100 years after his death, many who visit the Missouri Botanical Gardens still refer to it affectionately as "Shaw's Garden" or "Hank's Garden". For his philanthropic work, Shaw has been recognized with a star on the St. Louis Walk of Fame.
