= Dastkar =

- Formation: 1981
- Type: NGO
- Headquarters: Kisan Haat, Andheria Morh, Mehrauli; Delhi-74
- Services: crafts promotion
- Chairperson: Laila Tyabji
- Website: www.dastkar.org

Dastkar is an Indian non-government organisation working with craftspeople across India, for promotion and revival of traditional crafts of India. It was founded in 1981 in Delhi, by a group of six women, including Laila Tyabji, its current chairperson.

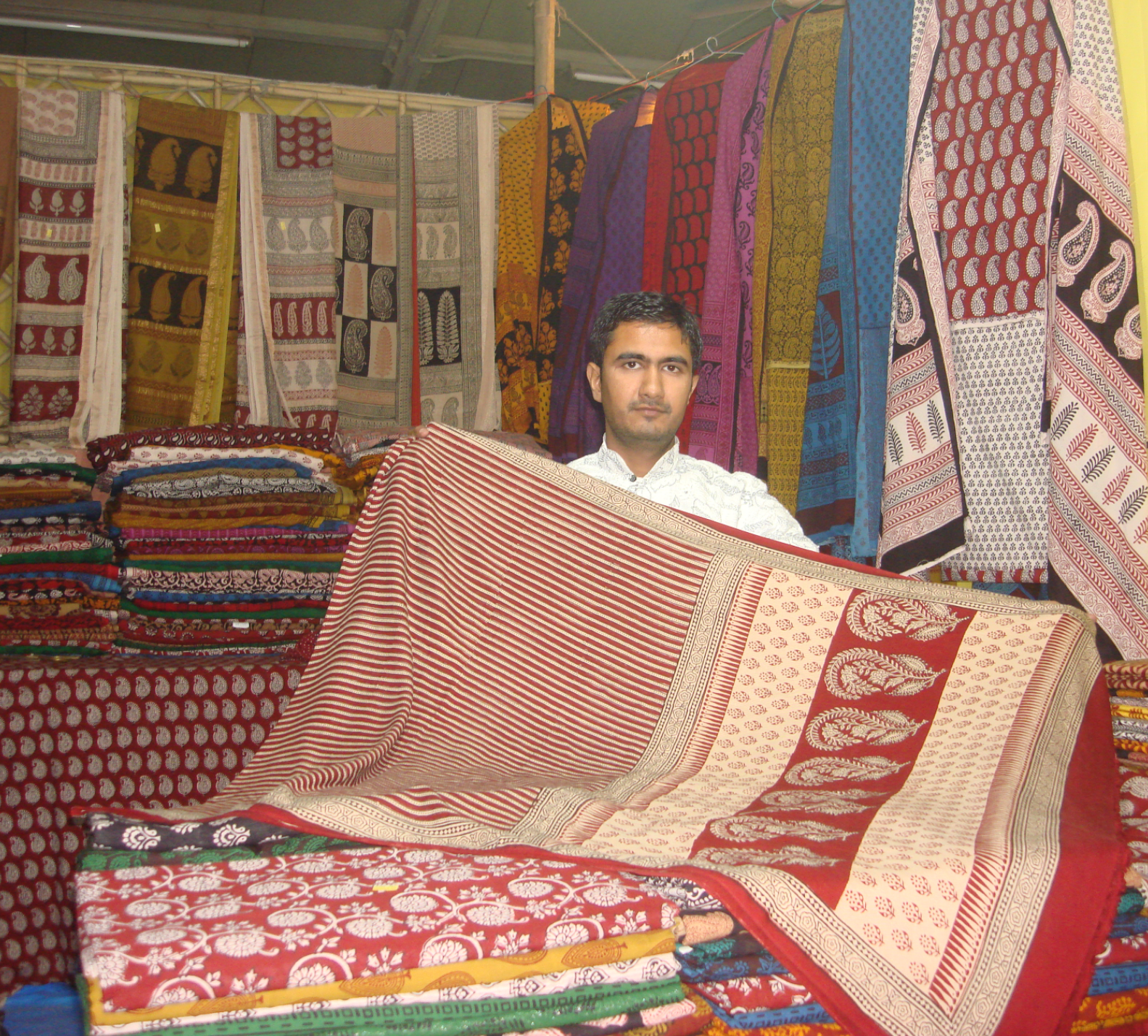
A traditional Bagh Print craftsman Mohammed Bilal Khatri from Bagh, Madhya Pradesh, at Dastkar Design Fair, 2015

Today, it is synonymous with the Dasktar Mela, a crafts exhibition it organises every year since 1982.

== History ==
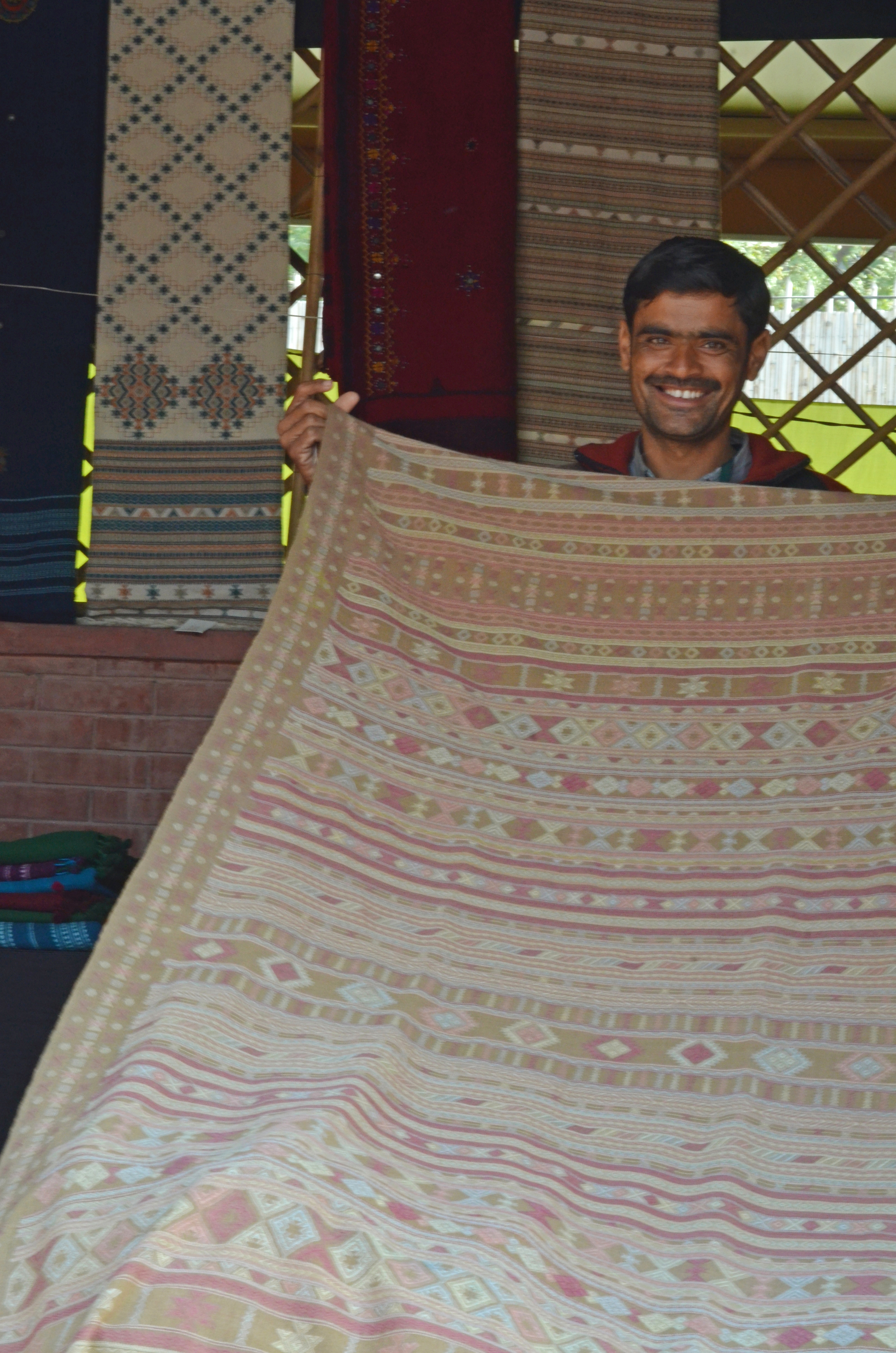
A traditional shawl maker from Kutch, Gujarat, at Dastkar Nature Bazaar, Mehrauli, 2014

Dastkar started working started with 15 crafts groups in 1981, and 30 years later it is associated 350 craft groups across India. Over the years, Dastkar has worked in women empowerment in rural areas, where it has been involved in developing self-reliant artisan groups.

In 2005, Tyabji became a founder-member of All India Artisans and Craft Workers Welfare Association (AIACA), along with Pritam Singh (Anokhi), Ritu Kumar, Madhukar Khera and Fabindia. She was awarded the Padma Shri by the Government of India in 2012.

== Dastkar Mela ==
Dastkar started organising the annual "Dastkar Mela", the crafts fair and exhibition during the autumn, preceding the autumn festive seasons, and Diwali. Held in Delhi, the mela sees craftspeople and artisans from over 22 states selling their works and crafts items. Besides this, it also features workshops and demonstrations by the artisans.

== Dastkar Nature Bazaar ==
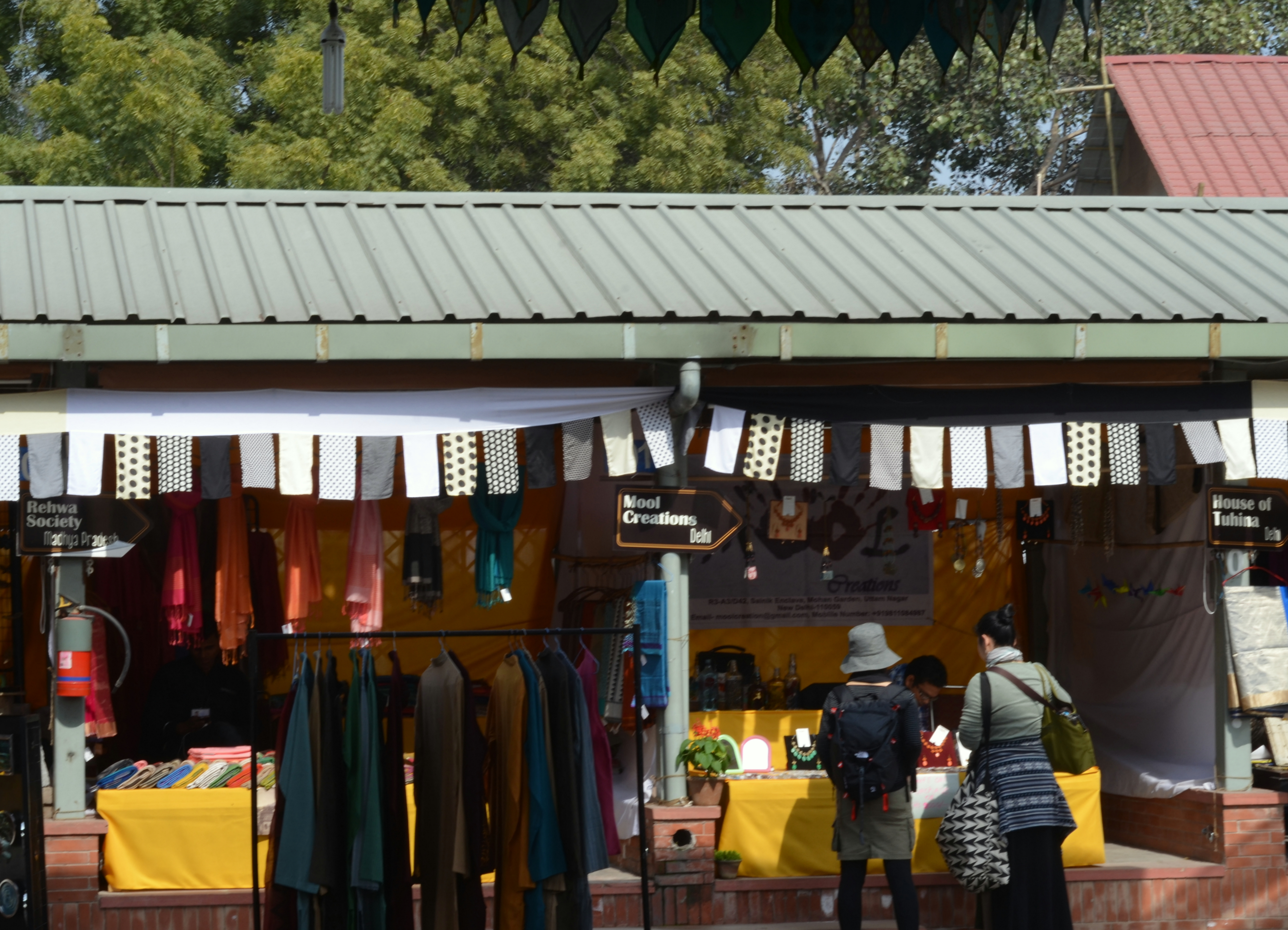
Handicraft shops at Dastkar Nature Bazaar, Mehrauli, 2014.

In 1983, it started organising the "Dastkar Nature Bazaar" after environmentalist Valmik Thapar suggested the idea of promoting natural materials and fibres, along with nature-inspired products with nature motifs and images of birds and animals. Over the years, it has been held at various locations in Delhi, including the Dilli Haat, Crafts Museum, Delhi, Indira Gandhi National Centre for the Arts (IGNCA) and Kisan Haat in Mehrauli. In 2012, the Kisan Haat in Mehrauli was taken on a 15-year lease from Delhi Tourism to organize where theme-based bazaars, this included South Asian Bazaar, Winter Weaves, and Basant Bazaar. Here regional and speciality cuisines from various parts of India has also been featured

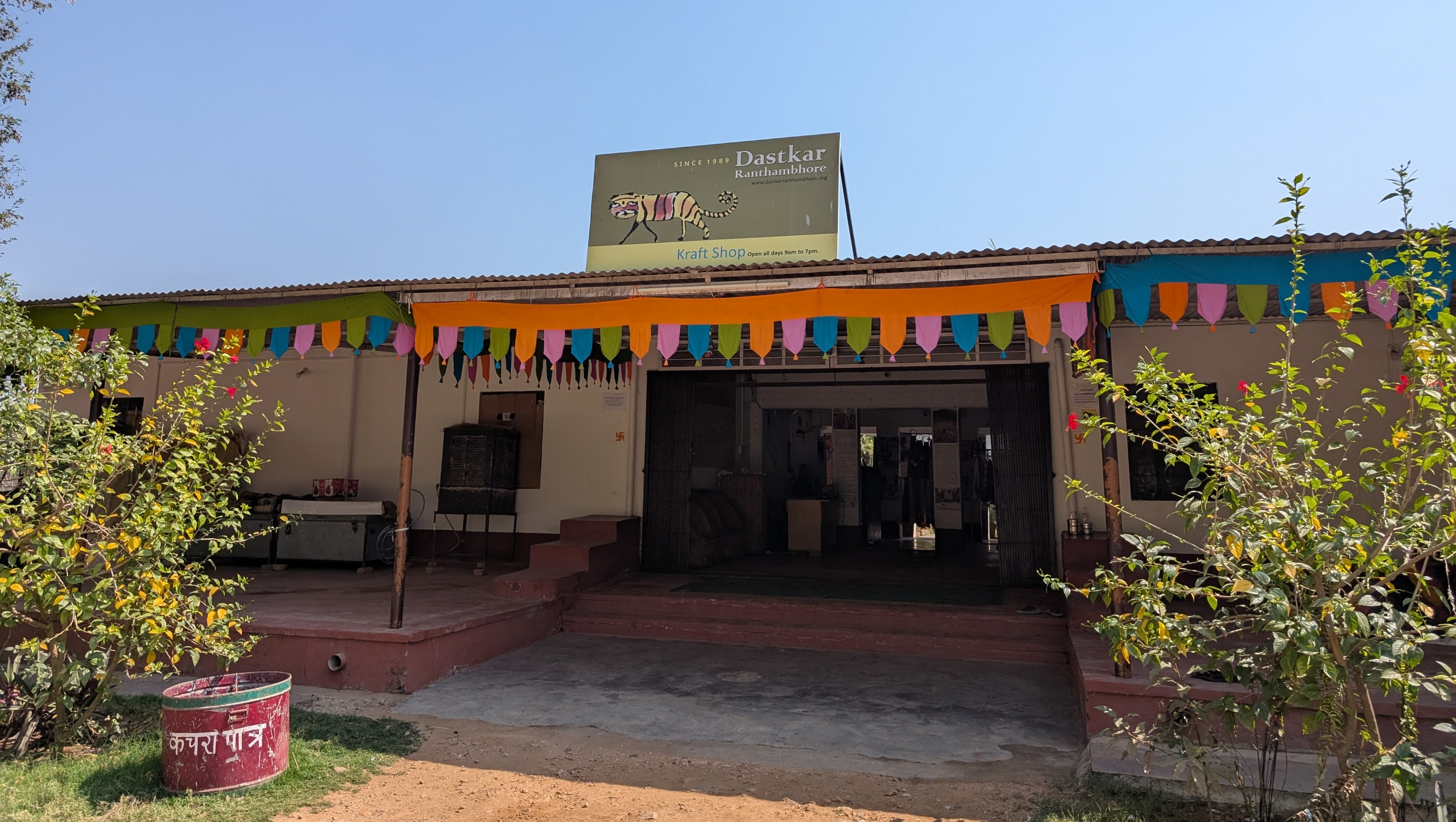
Dastkar Kraft Shop, Ranthambhore

Similar Dastkar Bazaars are now organized in many parts of the country, where craft groups and different states display and sell the works.

== Bibliography ==
- Radhika Singh (2010). The Fabric of Our Lives: The Story of Fabindia. Penguin Books India. ISBN 978-0-670-08434-0.
