= Frank S. Bissell =

Frank Semple Bissell (22 February 1913 – 9 September 2012) was an American wrestler and wrestling coach.

Bissell was born in Pittsburgh and was raised in Hyannis Port, Massachusetts and graduated from The Hill School in 1933. At Michigan, he was a National AAU Champion in 1936, and Big Ten Champion in 1937. He competed at the U.S. trials for the 1948 Summer Olympics.

Bissell served as head wrestling coach at The Hill School from 1947 to 1973, where he amassed a career record of 243-66-5 and guided the wrestling team to 17 Prep National Championships. He retired from coaching in 1973. During his tenure, 44 wrestlers claimed individual national championships.

He married Eleanor Reynolds Merrick in 1937.

He is the grandfather to indie filmmaker Maria Bissell.

He was inducted into the National Wrestling Hall of Fame in 2012. He died in September 2012, aged 99.
