= William Nanda Bissell =

Indian businessman

- Born: 10 June 1966 (age 60); New Delhi, India
- Occupation: Businessman
- Known for: Managing Director of Fabindia
- Notable work: Making India Work (Penguin India, 2009)

William Nanda Bissell (born 10 June 1966) an Indian businessman and the chairman of Fabindia. Until 2018, Bissell served as the managing director of the company.

== Early life and education ==
In 1960, John Bissell founded Fabindia, a company that connected rural craftsmen, weavers and artists from across India to urban markets.

Bissell grew up in Delhi and later attended Wesleyan University in the United States. After graduating in 1988, Bissell set up an artisans' co-operative based on the Gandhian model, which involved working with leather workers in Rajasthan. In 1993, Bissell returned to New Delhi to help John run Fabindia.

== Work ==
Bissell acquired Organic India. He has also served as a trustee of Centre for Science and Environment in Delhi.

In 2009, he authored Making India Work, published by Penguin India, in which he drew from the experience of working with over 40,000 rural craftspeople in India and addressed India's economical and socio-political challenges.

== Investing ==
Bissell is an angel investor and has made numerous investments across sectors, some of which include, the publishing platform Juggernaut Books, Wow! Momo, educational and school software startup Foradian.
