= Susan Bissell =

Canadian academic and human rights advocate

- Occupations: Senior advisor; scholar; consultant
- Employer: Independent
- Known for: Child protection

Susan Bissell is Canadian academic and human rights advocate, working as a visiting scholar and senior fellow at the FXB Centre for Health & Human Rights, T.H. Chan School of Public Health of Harvard University. Prior to this appointment, her thirty-year career with the United Nations Children's Fund (UNICEF) was centered on protecting the rights, safety, and security of children throughout the world.

Bissell obtained her first two degrees from the University of Toronto, and her PhD in public health and medical anthropology from the University of Melbourne. As an advocate for children, Bissell served as UNICEF's global lead on Child Protection, and was the founding director of the Global Partnership to End Violence Against Children.

Bissell's current board memberships include Cure Violence Global, Global Child and the FIFA Human Rights Advisory Board. With an interest in documentary film-making, she collaborated with Trudie Styler and the Bangladeshi team of Catherine and Tareque Masud to produce A Kind of Childhood, for television and the Human Rights Watch Film Festival. Currently, Bissell is an Executive Producer of Running to Stand Still / Heart of the Matter, focusing on migration around the world, the exploitation of men, women and children, and the people on the front lines respecting their dignity and humanity.

== Works ==
- Māsuda, Styler, Bissell, Tareque Masud, Catherine Masud, Trudie Styler, Shelley King, Māsuda, Kyātharina, Māsuda, Tāreka, Bissell, Susan, & Xingu Films, production company. (2002). A Kind of Childhood: Growing Up in Dhaka City [Video recording].
- Bissell, Susan (December 2015). "Protecting children from all forms of violence". Child Abuse & Neglect. 50: 9–14. doi:10.1016/j.chiabu.2015.08.012.
- McClure, Craig; Chandler, Caitlin; Bissell, Susan (January 2015). "Responses to HIV in sexually exploited children or adolescents who sell sex". The Lancet. 385 (9963): 97–99. doi:10.1016/S0140-6736(14)60979-X.
- Reading, Richard; Bissell, Susan; Goldhagen, Jeffrey; Harwin, Judith; Masson, Judith; Moynihan, Sian; Parton, Nigel; Pais, Marta Santos; Thoburn, June; Webb, Elspeth (January 2009). "Promotion of children's rights and prevention of child maltreatment". The Lancet. 373 (9660): 332–343. doi:10.1016/S0140-6736(08)61709-2.
- Cappa, Claudia; Moneti, Francesca; Wardlaw, Tessa; Bissell, Susan (September 2013). "Elimination of female genital mutilation/cutting". The Lancet. 382 (9898): 1080–1081. doi:10.1016/S0140-6736(13)61532-9.
- Santos Pais, Marta; Bissell, Susan (February 2006). "Overview and implementation of the UN Convention on the Rights of the Child". The Lancet. 367 (9511): 689–690. doi:10.1016/S0140-6736(06)68267-6.
- Bissell, Susan (June 2001). "Young Garment Workers in Bangladesh: Raising the rights question". Development. 44 (2): 75–80. doi:10.1057/palgrave.development.1110241. ISSN 1011-6370.
- AYNSLEY-GREEN, Albea; HALL, David; THOBURN, June; WEBB, Elspeth; READING, Richard; BISSELL, Susan; GOLDHAGEN, Jeffrey; HARWIN, Judith; MASSON, Judith; MOYNIHAN, Sian; PARTON, Nigel; SANTOS PAIS, Marta (2009). "Promotion of children's rights and prevention of child maltreatment. Commentary". Promotion of children's rights and prevention of child maltreatment. Commentary. 373 (9660): 280–281, 332–343 [14 p.] ISSN 0140-6736.
- Bissell, Susan L.; Steven, David (2022-05-30), "Founding the Global Partnership to End Violence against Children", Partnerships for Sustainability in Contemporary Global Governance (1 ed.), London: Routledge, pp. 167–186, doi:10.4324/9781003148371-10, ISBN 978-1-003-14837-1
- Bissell, Susan; Manderson, Lenore; Allotey, Pascale (January 2000). "In focus: Film, focus groups and working children in Bangladesh". Visual Anthropology. 13 (2): 169–183. doi:10.1080/08949468.2000.9966796. ISSN 0894-9468.
- Poole, O., Bell, M., & Bissell, S. (2013). Hope comes to the heart of Africa/Disaster on a colossal scale - but as far as the media is concerned, it isn’t news/Unicef needs the help of states, communities - and people like you. Independent (London, England : 1986), 29–31.
- Hockings, P., Jhala, J., Mahias, M.-C., Jeffery, P., Jeffery, R., Bissell, S., Manderson, L., Allotey, P., & Maaker, E. de. (2000). Excursions with the camera in Hindustan. Visual Anthropology (Journal), 13(2), 99–198.
- Harcourt, W., Evans, J. L., Goonesekere, S., Cupples, J., Brown, J., Combes, B., Bosch, A., French, J., Antrobus, P., Jain, D., Thomson, M., Karlsson, L., Hammill, J., Bissell, S., Nyland, B., Johnson-Welch, C., Strickland, R., Kent, G., Ardaya, N. S., ... Doe, S. S. J. (2001). Women’s rights and child rights. Development (Society for International Development), 44(2), 3–116.
- Bissell, Susan (June 2001). "Young Garment Workers in Bangladesh: Raising the rights question". Development. 44 (2): 75–80. doi:10.1057/palgrave.development.1110241. ISSN 1011-6370.
