= Nicholas L. Bissell Jr. =

American politician

Nicholas Louis Bissell Jr.
- Born: January 14, 1947
- Died: November 27, 1996 (aged 49); Laughlin, Nevada
- Occupation: Prosecutor
- Employer: Somerset County, New Jersey
- Spouse: Barbara Bissell
- Parent(s): Nicholas Louis Bissell Sr. (1919–2002) & Louise Bissell

Nicholas Louis "Nick" Bissell Jr. (January 14, 1947 – November 27, 1996) was the county prosecutor of Somerset County, New Jersey. After being charged with embezzlement, tax fraud and abuse of power, he fled to Laughlin, Nevada, and killed himself after a standoff with US Marshals.

== Biography ==
Born in 1947 to Nicholas L. Bissell Sr. (1919–2002) and his wife, Louise, Nick Bissell grew up in Woodbridge Township, New Jersey, and later moved to Somerville, New Jersey. He entered private practice, then worked as a part-time judge. He then became an assistant prosecutor in Somerset County, and was appointed county prosecutor in 1982 by Governor Tom Kean. He held that position for 13 years. His specialty was civil forfeiture. At one point, the value of the assets he seized were the highest in the state, even though Somerset County is the eighth-smallest county in New Jersey. One of his best-known cases that didn't involve a forfeiture was the prosecution of Matthew Heikkila, a 21-year-old from affluent Basking Ridge, who, on January 29, 1991, murdered his adoptive parents. Although Bissell pressed for the death penalty, the jury sentenced Heikkila to two consecutive life sentences.

=== 1995 Franklin Township jewelry store shooting ===
In March 1995, Bissell led the Somerset County Prosecutor's Office investigation into the fatal shooting of Brenda Lee Marks-Wolf during a robbery at Jeffrey Scott Fine Jewelers, the Franklin Township store she owned with her husband, Jeffrey Wolf. Although Jeffrey Wolf continually maintained that an armed robber had shot her, Bissell announced at a press conference that ballistic evidence showed she had actually been killed by a bullet fired from her husband's own .357 Magnum handgun, and that the .22-caliber firearm carried by suspect Marqis A. Kennon had not been fired. Authorities ultimately absolved Jeffrey Wolf of criminal charges, ruling the shooting accidental, and Bissell pursued felony murder, robbery, and conspiracy charges against five men accused in the plot—even as Marks-Wolf's parents and a defense ballistics expert later testified during co-defendant Harry Insabella's June 1996 trial regarding discrepancies in Jeffrey Wolf's account and evidence that the fatal shot was fired from two to four inches away. In the resulting prosecutions, Kennon and a juvenile co-defendant were convicted of murder, Robert L. Williams was convicted of robbery and weapons charges, and Insabella admitted to helping plan the robbery. Accused ringleader Avram D. Gottlieb was acquitted of murder charges in November 1997 but convicted of armed robbery and weapons offenses, receiving a life sentence. After serving nearly 30 years, Gottlieb's sentence was commuted for immediate release by Governor Phil Murphy in January 2026.

=== Forfeiture Case Indictment ===
In 1990, a forfeiture case proved to be Bissell's downfall. On May 10, 1990, James Giuffre was arrested on charges of selling $700 worth of cocaine. Bissell said he would drop the charges if Giuffre forfeited two plots of land to the prosecutor's office, valued at $174,000. They were sold at auction below their appraised value to a friend of Bissell's chief of detectives. Giuffre filed a civil suit against Bissell (which the Somerset County Freeholders later settled for $435,000) and also then contacted the Internal Revenue Service and the FBI. Forensic accountants with the IRS discovered that Bissell skimmed cash from a gas station of which he was part owner. The FBI discovered that Bissell had destroyed a suspect's written request for a lawyer and threatened to frame his gasoline wholesaler for cocaine possession.

=== Bissell Indicted ===
In September 1995, Bissell was indicted on 30 federal charges of mail fraud, tax evasion and abuse of power, and was promptly fired by Governor and Somerset County resident Christine Todd Whitman.

=== 1996 Federal Convictions ===
In May 1996, he was convicted on all charges and faced a minimum sentence of six to eight years in federal prison and a maximum of ten years. He was released under the condition that he wear an electronic bracelet until he was sentenced. He abruptly cut it off on November 18, 1996, and fled to Nevada, leaving a note in which he stated that he intended to commit suicide. He was tracked by his cell phone.

=== 1996 Suicide ===
He fatally shot himself after a 10-minute standoff in his hotel room, while members of the United States Marshals Service tried to lure him out of his room.
