= George I. Barnett =

American architect

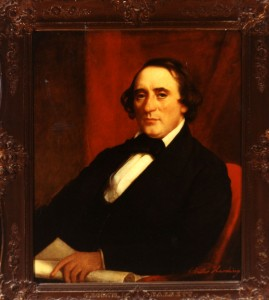
- Born: George Ingham Barnett; 1815; Nottingham, England
- Died: December 29, 1898 (aged 82–83); St. Louis, Missouri, U.S.
- Occupation: Architect
- Buildings: Missouri Governor's Mansion, Tower Grove House, Henry Shaw Mausoleum, Boyle Mansion

George Ingham Barnett (1815–1898) was an architect from St. Louis, Missouri. He was called "The Dean of St. Louis Architecture" for his contributions to the buildings of St. Louis as well as for his influence on other architects in the United States.

== Early life in England ==
Barnett was born in Nottingham, England. He completed a classical education by the age of 16, then trained with Sir Thomas Hine at a builder in Nottingham, and then took on an apprenticeship with an architectural firm in London. Barnett left England for the United States in early 1839, remaining in New York City for six months before departing for St. Louis.

== Work in St. Louis and Illinois ==
Barnett designed hundreds of buildings in St. Louis, many in Greek Revival, Italianate, and Gothic design. Barnett did not deviate from classical designs, and his portfolio was largely responsible for establishing Classicism as St. Louis' dominant architectural influence. His works included houses, churches, commercial, and civic structures. Among his best known structures are renovations to the Old Courthouse, the Missouri Governor's mansion, the structures of the Missouri Botanical Garden, Tower Grove Park, the Southern Hotel, and country home of Louis Auguste Benoist. The Samuel Moody Grubbs House in Litchfield Illinois. The only structure in Illinois he designed. It is a second Empire design.

Barnett died at his home in St. Louis on December 29, 1898.

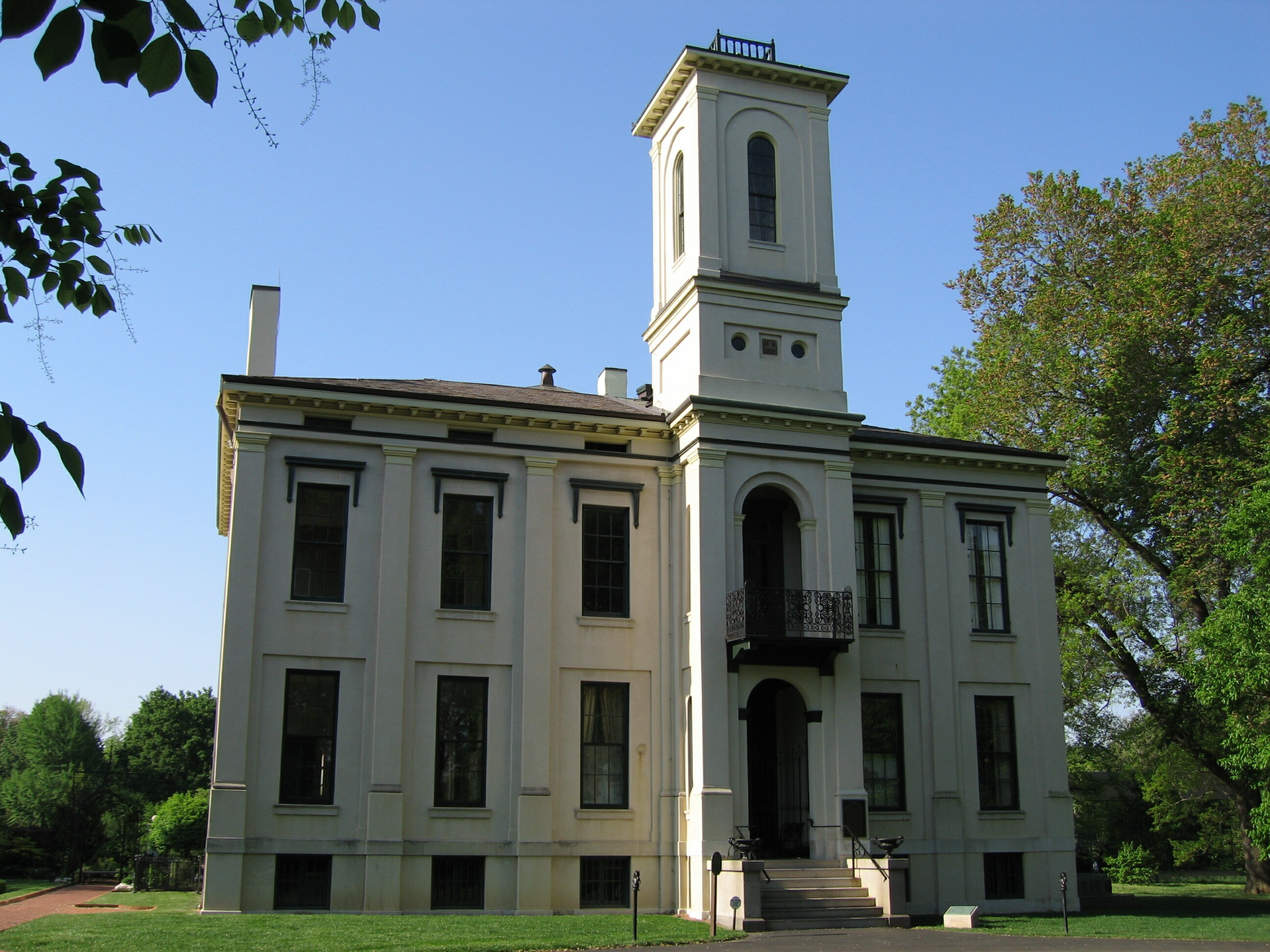
Tower Grove House, 1849

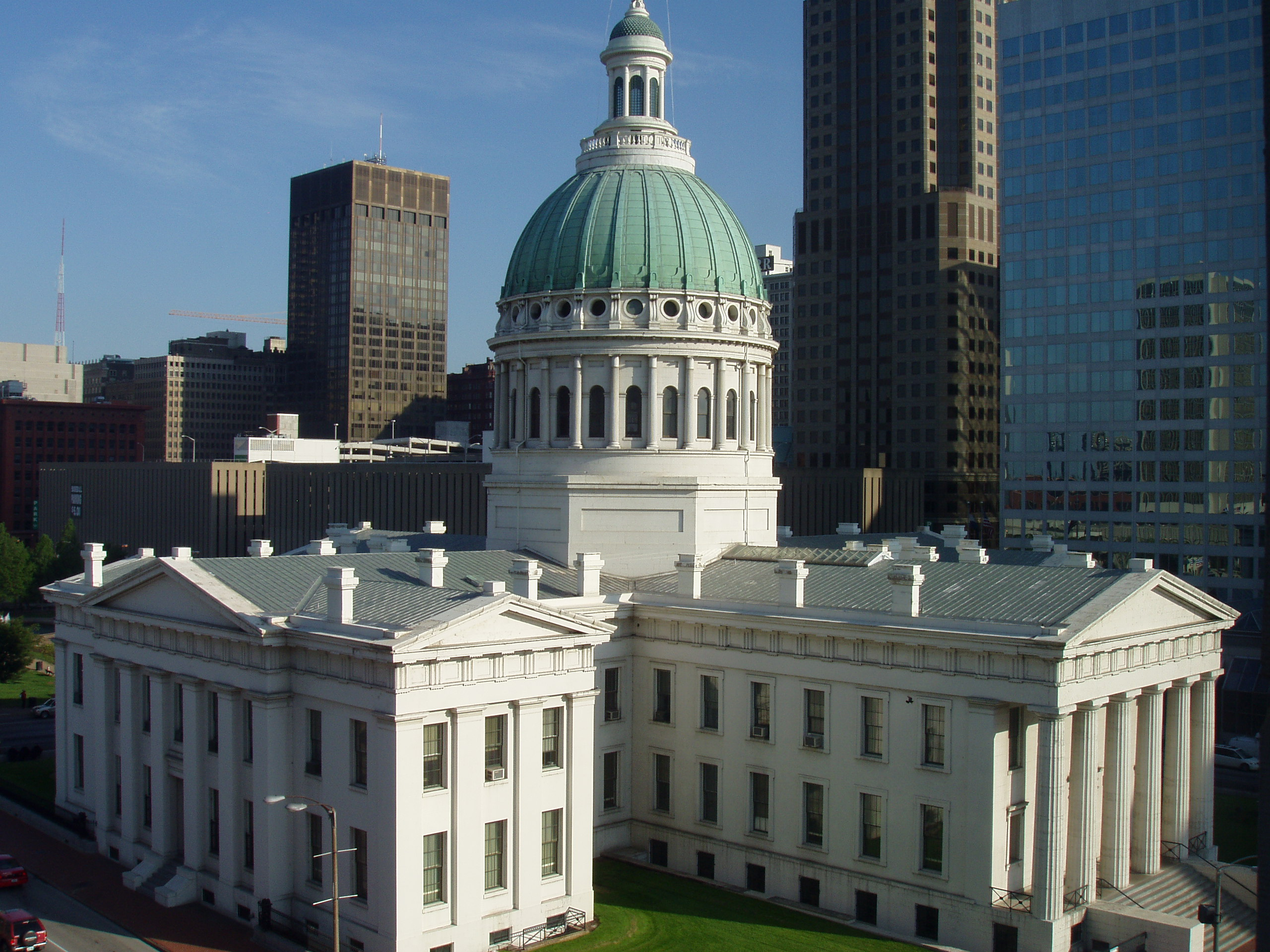
Old Courthouse, completed 1864

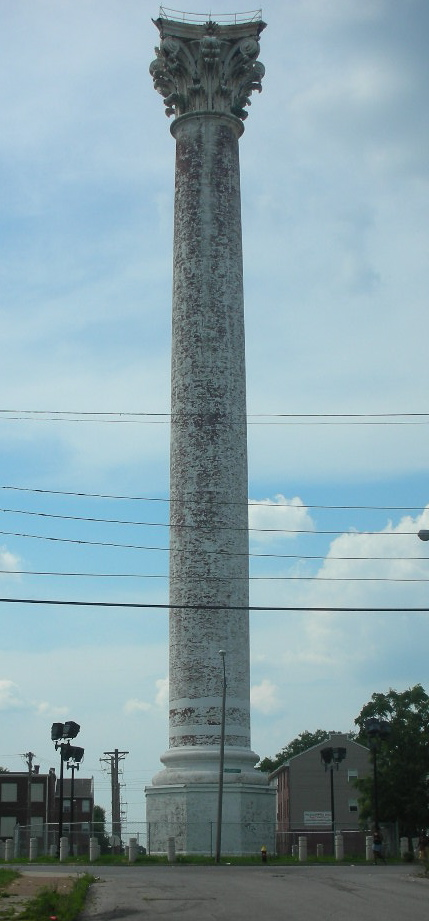
Grand Avenue Water Tower, 1871

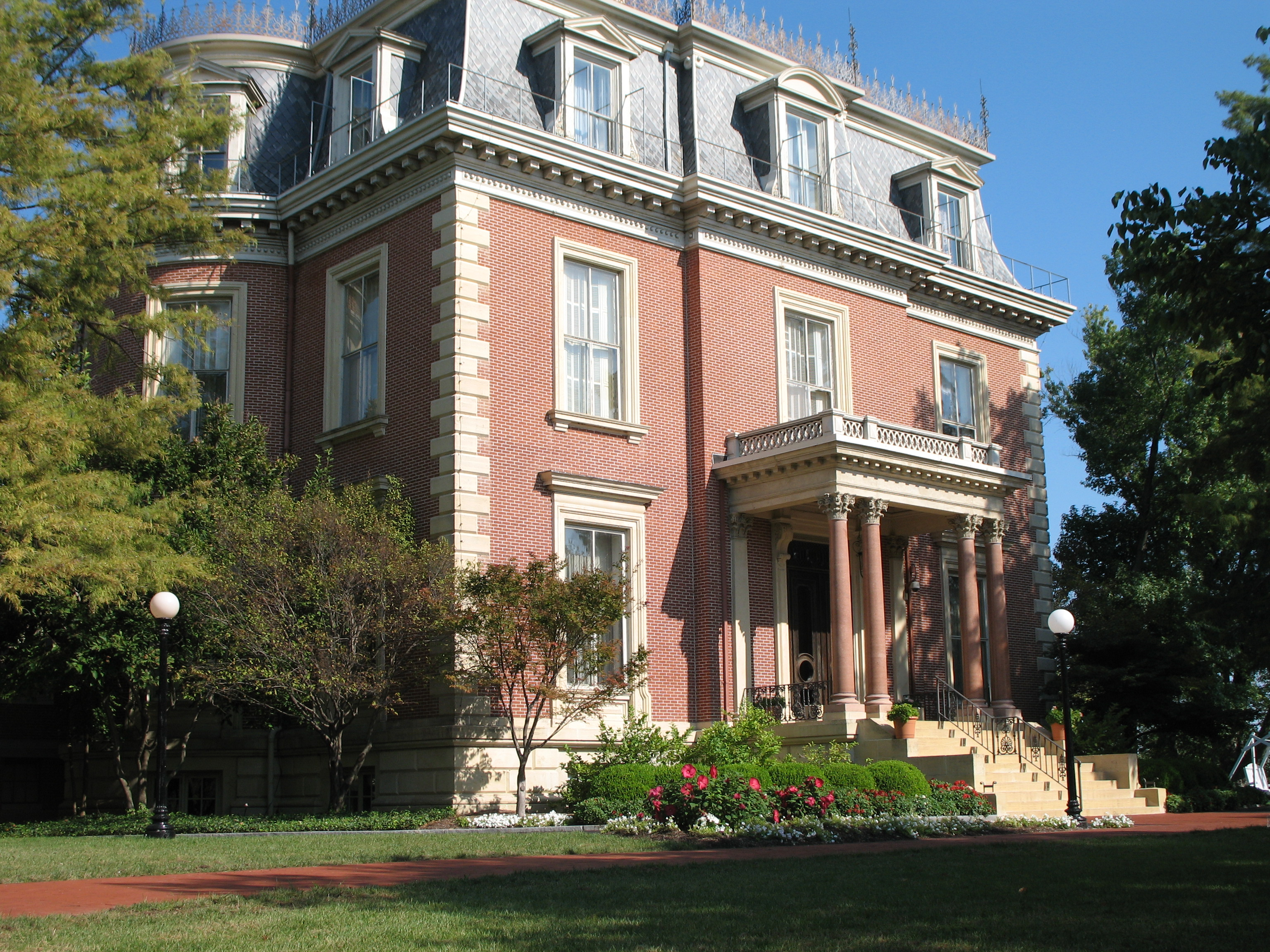
Missouri Governor's Mansion, 1871

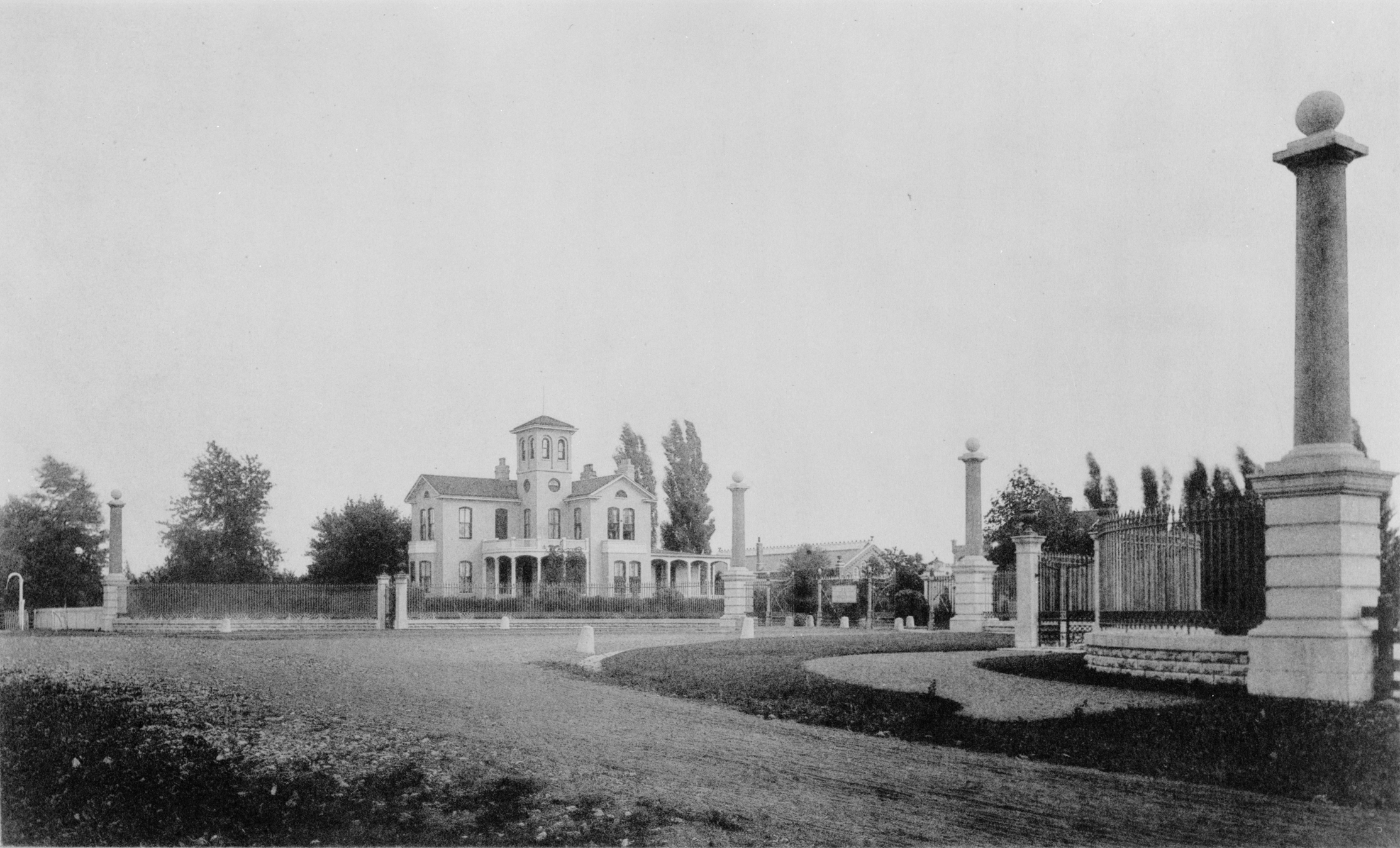
Tower Grove Park, 1875

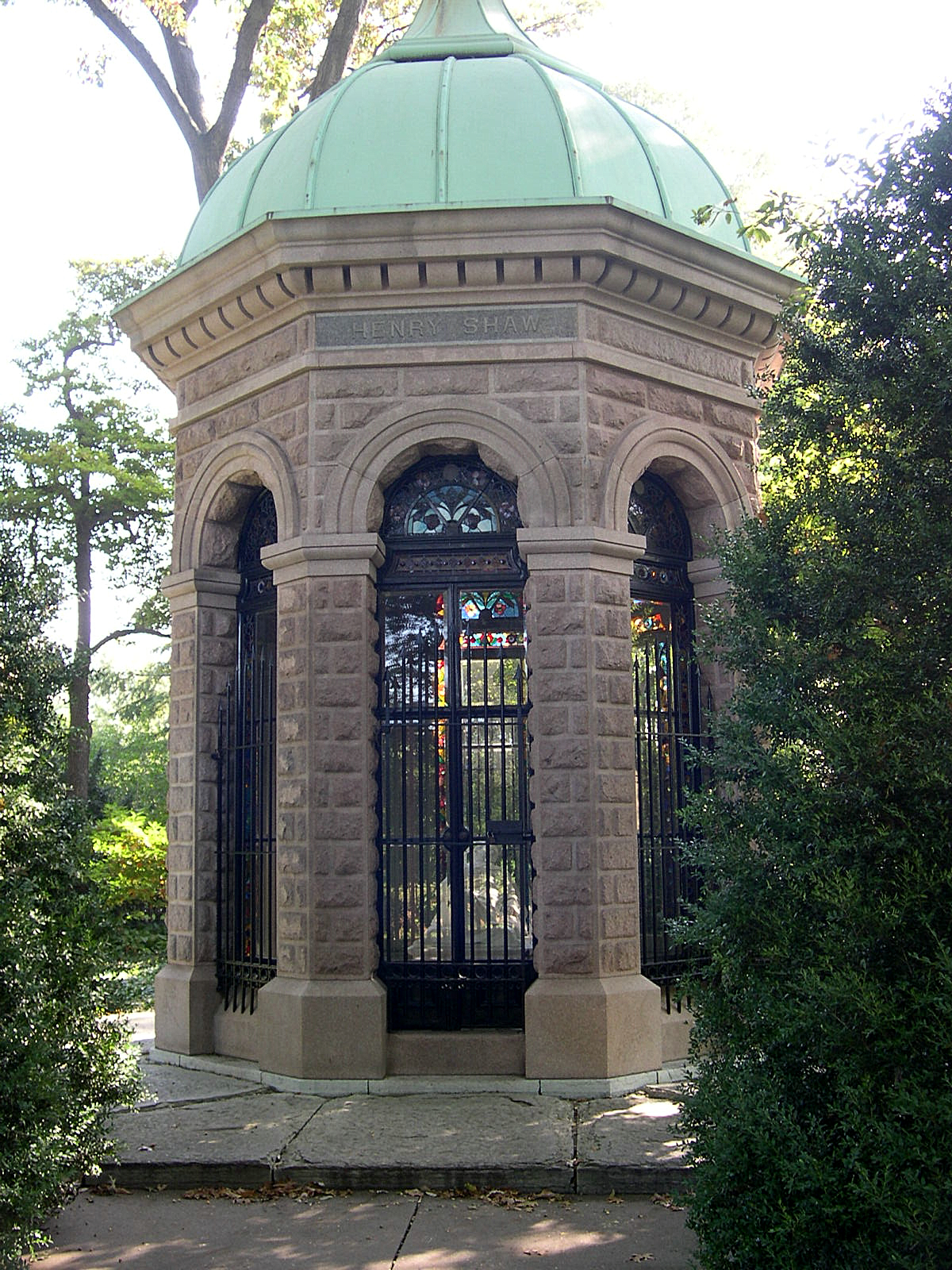
Henry Shaw Mausoleum, 1889

== Influence on other architects ==
Barnett's son, Thomas P. Barnett, trained with the elder Barnett and went on to design such American landmarks as the Cathedral Basilica of St. Louis and the Adolphus Hotel in Dallas. His other son, George D. Barnett, and his son-in-law, John Ignatius Haynes, joined Tom Barnett to form the architectural firm of Barnett, Haynes & Barnett. His eldest son, Absalom J. Barnett, became a successful architect in San Francisco.

Other notable architects who apprenticed under Barnett included Henry G. Isaacs, Alfred H. Piquenard, Charles F. May, H. William Kirchner, Isaac S. Taylor and George S. Mills.
