= Daniel Bissell =

Daniel Bissell may refer to:

- Daniel Bissell (spy) (1754–1824), American spy during the Revolutionary War
- Daniel Bissell (general) (1768–1833), American soldier, active during the War of 1812
- Daniel P. Bissell (1802–1874), American physician and politician
