= Harold Busséll =

American pastor and author

Harold L. Busséll is a pastor and author. He has a M.A. in psychology from Santa Clara University and a Doctorate of Divinity from Andover Newton Theological Seminary. Between 1968 and 1970 he served with Teen Challenge Paris, a Christian outreach program that works with drug addicts in Paris, France. His book Unholy Devotion – Why Cults Lure Christians, (later renamed, By Hook or by Crook: How Cults Lure Christians) talks about his experiences while in Europe. Busséll has written, "my wife and I were involved with an Evangelical youth mission based in Switzerland. We were with the group only six weeks, but it was almost seven years before I had overcome the psychological damage caused by their cult-like control and spiritualization... Questioning a leader was considered an act of rebellion against God and His chain of command." Busséll went on to become a pastor in Saratoga, California. He also served as one of the Deans at Gordon College. Busséll served as senior pastor from 1984 to 1996 at the First Congregational Church in Hamilton, Massachusetts, a mainline church affiliated with the United Church of Christ. The New York Times recognizes Busséll as an author who has written books about mind control and religious groups. Christianity Today noted Busséll as a pastor who has "experienced spiritual warfare." Paul R. Martin has noted Busséll's opinion on recovery from what they refer to as cults, that "a clear understanding of the gospel is the single most important issue in a cultist's recovery and future immunity from further cultic involvement."

== Books ==
- Thoughtful Prayers For Serious Believers. Nashville: Westbow. 2016. ISBN 978-1512739534.
- Unholy Devotion – Why Cults Lure Christians. Grand Rapids: Zondervan. 1983. ISBN 0-310-37251-8.

Later published as:

- By Hook or by Crook : How Cults Lure Christians. New York: McCracken. 1993. ISBN 1-56977-585-0.
- Lord, I Can Resist Anything But Temptation. Grand Rapids: Zondervan. 1985. ISBN 0-310-37271-2.
