= Bissell Bridge =

Bissell Bridge may refer to:

- Bissell Bridge (Connecticut), over the Connecticut River, connecting the towns of Windsor and South Windsor, Connecticut, U.S.
- Bissell Bridge (Massachusetts), over Mill Brook in Charlemont, Massachusetts, U.S.
