= Juggernaut Books =

Book publishing house

- Founded: September 2015
- Founder: Chiki Sarkar
- Country of origin: India
- Headquarters location: New Delhi, India
- Distribution: Online and physical
- Publication types: Online publishing, short stories, autobiographies, ebooks
- Official website: www.juggernaut.in

Juggernaut Books is a publisher headquartered in New Delhi, India. Starting with digital books distributed via its website and mobile app, it turned to publishing physical books later

== History ==
Juggernaut was founded by Chiki Sarkar in September 2015. Before co-founding Juggernaut, Sarkar was a publisher of Penguin India and founder-publisher of Random House India. Raghunath was the CEO of Network18 Digital, senior VP-Growth, at Zomato and also founded Firstpost.

Juggernaut raised Rs 15 crores in its initial round of seed funding from Fabindia's chairman William Bissell; former CEO and co-founder of Infosys, Nandan Nilekani and MD of Boston Consulting Group, Neeraj Aggarwal.

In April 2016, Juggernaut launched India's first mobile-publishing application. Priya Ramani was appointed as the editor-at-large for its digital properties in the same year. In February 2017, Raghunath resigned from the post of CEO and decided to continue as a shareholder. Simran Khara is the current CEO of the publishing house.

In December 2017, Bharti Airtel acquired a strategic stake in the house. In March 2019, American publishing house HarperCollins joined in a partnership with Juggernaut Books, becoming their sales, distribution partner.

== Controversies ==
On 4 August 2017, Delhi High Court imposed a ban on publication and sale of book Godman to Tycoon: The Untold Story of Baba Ramdev from Juggernaut Books written by Priyanka Pathak Narain based on Ramdev's life. After a legal battle with Ramdev, the ex-parte interim injunction was lifted from the book on 28 April 2018.

In 2018, the book The Burning Forest: India's war in Bastar published from Juggernaut books, written by Delhi University professor Nandini Sundar based on Maoist insurgency and the violence in Bastar was dropped from the department's syllabus. Sundar was also indicted in a murder case filed by a woman called Vimla Baghel of her husband, a Maoist activist. But in February 2019, the professor was cleared of murder charges by police.

== Published works ==
- Akbar of Hindustan by Parvati Sharma (2022)
