= Fabindia =

Indian chain retailer

- Type: Private/community owned
- Industry: Textiles, home furnishings, handloom apparel, jewellery
- Founded: 1960
- Founder: John Bissell
- Headquarters: New Delhi, India
- Key people: William Nanda Bissell (Managing Director)
- Revenue: ▲₹1,688 crore (US$180 million) (FY23)
- Net income: ▼₹−121 crore (US$−13 million) (FY23)
- Website: www.fabindia.com

Fabindia is an Indian chain store retailing garments, home decor, furnishings, fabrics, and products handmade by craftspeople across rural India. Established in 1960 by John Bissell, an American working for the Ford Foundation, New Delhi, Fabindia started out exporting home furnishings, before stepping into domestic retail in 1976, when it opened its first retail store in Greater Kailash, New Delhi. The chairman of the company is John Bissell's son, William Nanda Bissell. As of July 2020, Fabindia operated 350 stores across India and 14 international stores.

In 2008, Fabindia had a revenue of $65 million, a 30% increase from the previous year. Fabindia sources its products from across India through 17 community-owned companies, a certain percentage of the shares of which are held by artisans and craftspersons.

The products of Fabindia are mainly sourced from villages, helping to provide and sustain rural employment in India. They are currently produced by over 40,000 artisans and craftspeople across India. The hand-crafted products also encourage good craftsmanship.

== History ==
=== 1960: Foundation and early decades ===
Fabindia was founded as an export company for home furnishings by John Bissell in two small rooms adjoining his bedroom in Golf Links, as "Fabindia Inc.", incorporated in Canton, Connecticut, and financed by his recently deceased grandmother's $20,000 legacy. Originally from Hartford, where his grandfather was the president of the Hartford Fire & Life Insurance Company; Bissell left his position as a buyer for Macy's, New York, and relocated to India in 1958 as a consultant for the Ford Foundation, advising the government of India-run Central Cottage Industries Corporation and given a two-year grant for instructing Indian villagers in the making of goods for export. He believed in the emerging Indian textile industry and was determined to showcase Indian handloom textiles as a way to employ traditional artisans. In 1964, Bissell met British designer Terence Conran, whose newly established home furnishing retail company, Habitat, soon became one of their biggest customers. Fabindia also established a distribution network in the United States, supplying products to small retailers, including mom-and-pop shops. Bissell travelled across craft-based villages and towns in India, meeting weavers and entrepreneurs who would produce flat weaves, pale colors, and precise weights in handloom yardage. His main supplier became A. S. Khera, a dhurrie and home furnishing manufacturer in Panipat. By 1965, the company had a turnover of Rs. 20 lakhs and moved into an office.

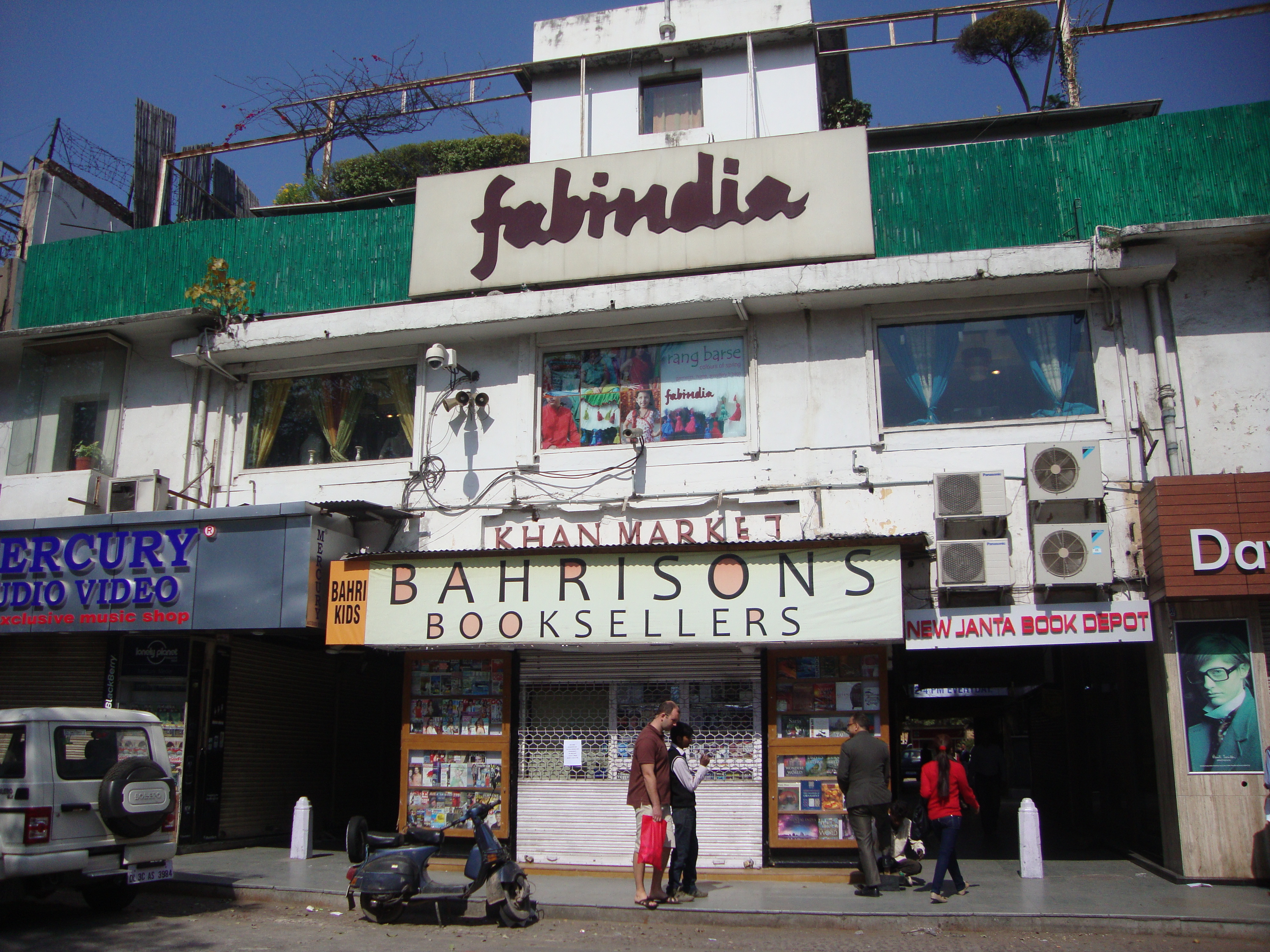
Fabindia outlet in Khan Market, New Delhi

In 1976, major equity restructuring occurred within the company, in adherence with Reserve Bank of India's rules instructing foreign companies to limit their foreign equity to 40 percent. Fabindia offered shares to close family members, associates, and suppliers like Madhukar Khera, an early supplier to the company. This was also the height of the Indian Emergency period (1975–1976), when the rule barring commercial establishments from being operated at residential properties was implemented, forcing the company from its secondary premises, a house on the Mathura Road, and prompting Bissell to open the first Fabindia retail store in Greater Kailash, N-Block market in New Delhi, in 1976 that remains its registered office.

Now catering to urban India as well in the coming decade, Fabindia differentiated itself from other government-owned and often subsidized competitors in handloom fabrics and the apparel sector, like KVIC and various state emporiums, by adapting its fabrics and designs to urban tastes. For this, designers were enlisted to modernize its line of home linens and, most importantly, introduced a range of ready-to-wear garments, including churidar-kurta suits for women and men's shirts. Today, Fabindia's team of designers continues to provide most of the designs and colors, created by village-based artisans who, in turn, learned the basics of quality, consistency, and finish, such as avoiding frayed edges on handwoven shawls. The result was that traditional apparel and products became mainstream, fashionable, and quickly adopted by a growing Indian middle-class and identified as the brand for the elite and intellectual, as well as affordable ethnic chic.

Fabindia lost its biggest customer, UK-based Habitat, in 1992, when the latter was bought by Ikano group, founder of IKEA, which then decided to appoint its own buying agent in India. The following year, John Bissell suffered a stroke, and his son William gradually took over the helm, completing the leadership transition after the death of his father in 1998 at the age 66. William, an undergrad from Wesleyan University who had majored in philosophy, political science and government, had spent several years in Jodhpur since completing his education in 1988. Working with rural artisans and crafts co-operatives across Rajasthan, he was instrumental in the formation of various weavers' cooperatives. One of the first tasks taken up by William was shifting Fabindia's focus to the domestic market, en route to becoming a retail chain; until then, it only had two stores in Delhi. In time, Fabindia's retail business overtook its exports.

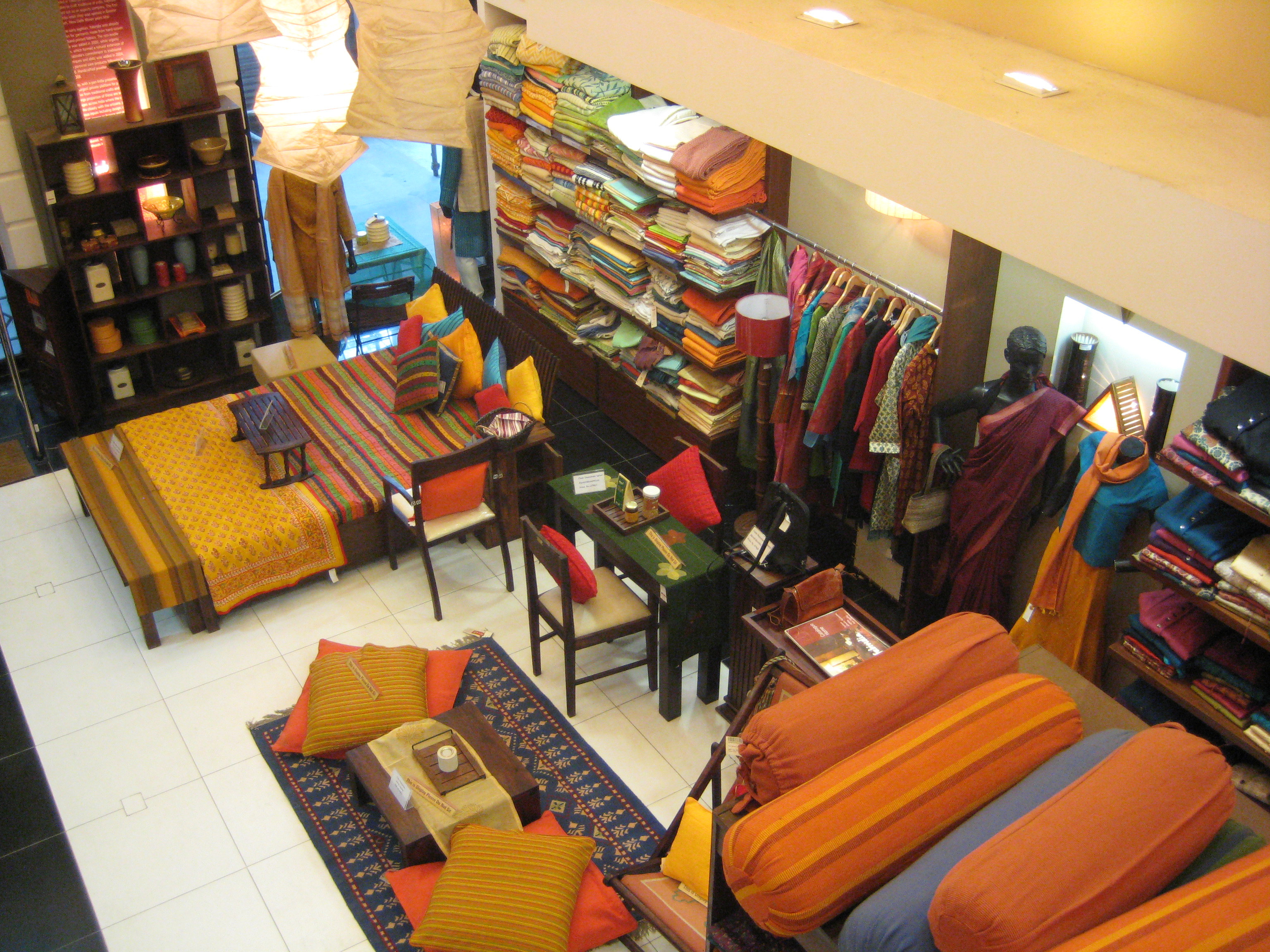
Interior of a Fabindia store in Delhi.

=== 2000 onwards ===
Over the next two decades, Fabindia emerged as a successful retail business in India, with 111 retail outlets within the country and 6 abroad. Fabindia added its non-textile range in 2000, organic foods in 2004, personal care products in 2006, and finally its range of handcrafted jewellery in 2008. Fabindia sells a variety of products ranging from textiles, garments, stationery, furniture, home accessories, ceramics, organic foods, and bodycare products, besides exporting home furnishings. Fabindia's retail expansion plans started taking shape from 2004 onward as it opened multiple and larger stores in metros like Mumbai, Chennai and Delhi, while at the same time spreading out beyond metros to cities like Vadodara, Dehradun, Coimbatore and Bhubaneswar, Durgapur. Revenues also grew from Rs 89 crore in 2004–05 to Rs 129 crore in 2005–06, reaching Rs 200 crore in 2007, the year when it sourced its products from 22,000 artisans in 21 states.

Usually, village-based artisans in India get barely 5% of the tag price of their products, as the rest is taken away by the middlemen. To counter this practice, Fabindia introduced an artisan-shareholder system through "supply-region companies" incorporated as subsidiaries. Here, the craftspeople collectively own 26% of the equity in each company, based in nationwide centres, with Artisans Micro Finance, a Fabindia arm holding 49%, and employees and other private investors holding the balance. Also as part of its expansion plans, 6% in Fabindia was sold in 2007 at an estimated $11 million to Wolfensohn Capital Partners, a private equity firm founded by former World Bank president James Wolfensohn. In 2009, it acquired a 25% stake in UK based £30 million ethnic womenswear retailer, EAST. Today the company has retail outlets in all major cities of India—137 at last count—in addition to international stores in Dubai, UAE; 3 stores in Bahrain; Doha, State of Qatar; Rome, Italy; and one in Guangzhou, China.

In 2005, Fabindia became a founder-member of All India Artisans and Craft Workers Welfare Association (AIACA), along with Pritam Singh (Anokhi), Ritu Kumar, Madhukar Khera and Laila Tyabji (Dastkar). On the occasion of its 50th anniversary in 2010, the company made all its 842 employees shareholders. By 2012, the company had around 1,000 employees and 16 community-owned companies, or supplier region companies (SRCs), that were formed in 2007 and employ 86,000 artisans.

In 2013, Fabindia purchased a 40% stake in the Lucknow-based organic food and supplements company Organic India, co-founded by Hindu convert and daughter of billionaire Edgar Bronfman, Sr., Holly Bronfman Lev, in 1997.

=== Launch of Fabels ===
In 2014, Fabindia launched a western wear brand "Fabels". The brand was first launched at Fabindia's Connaught Place store in Delhi, and later made available across India. Currently, Fabindia sells through its own retail outlets, multi-brand stores, and online store.

== Controversy ==
On 3 April 2015, Union Minister of Human Resource Development, Smriti Irani allegedly spotted a camera positioned to record near a changing room, at an outlet of Fabindia in Candolim, Goa. She immediately raised an alarm, alerting her husband and then called a local legislator, Michael Lobo, who lodged a First Information Report (FIR).

A local court later came down heavily on the Calangute police, saying that they exercised their power of arrest arbitrarily against four staff members of Fabindia's Candolim outlet who were held late on 3 April.

Judge Dvijple Patkar said, "It appears that the police have lightly interfered/tampered with the personal liberty of the applicants for reasons best known to them. It appears that the applicants were automatically and unnecessarily arrested by the police. In my opinion, the circumstances of the case do not warrant any arrest. The police officer exercising the power of arrest, as well as the investigating officer, has not stated any valid justification for the arrest."

On 8 April 2015 company's Managing Director, William Bissell, its former chief executive officer, Subrata Dutta, regional manager Ruchira Puri, marketing chief Ramu Chandra, stores in-charge Kundan Gupta, E-commerce head Arun Naikar, and category head Ashima Agarwal have sought anticipatory bail to avoid arrest in district court in Mapusa town.

In October 2021, Fabindia received backlash after they named their Diwali collection as 'Jashn-e-Riwaaz'.

== Philanthropy ==
William and John Bissell established "The Fabindia School" in 1992 in Bali, in Pali district of Rajasthan, today it is co-educational, senior secondary school with 600 students including 40% in partnership with "The John Bissell Scholars Fund", established in 2000.

== Acknowledgments ==
Fabindia was awarded "Best Retail Brand" in 2004 by The Economic Times. In 2004, Fabindia was featured as part of a CNBC special TV report on India. Fabindia brand does not advertise, and largely works through word-of-mouth publicity, then in 2007 the craft-conscious enterprise concept of Fabindia became a Harvard Business School case study. 2010 marked 50 years of the foundation of Fabindia, and release of the book, The Fabric of Our Lives: The Story of Fabindia, by Radhika Singh.

== Notes ==
- "Fabindia- Fabric of India (Case Study)" (PDF). NMIMS. 2010. Archived from the original (PDF) on 27 November 2010.

== Bibliography ==
- Mira Kamdar (2007). Planet India: How the Fastest Growing Democracy Is Transforming America and the World. Scribner. pp. 185–188. ISBN 978-1-4165-3863-9.
- Radhika Singh (2010). The Fabric of Our Lives: The Story of Fabindia. Penguin Books India. ISBN 978-0-670-08434-0.
- Mukti Khaire; Prabakar Pk Kothandaraman (2010). Fabindia Overseas Pvt. Ltd. Harvard Business School Publishing.
- William Nanda Bissell (2010). Making India Work. Penguin Books Limited. ISBN 978-81-8475-393-6.
