= Taraben Premchand =

Indian suffragist, social worker, and independence movement activist

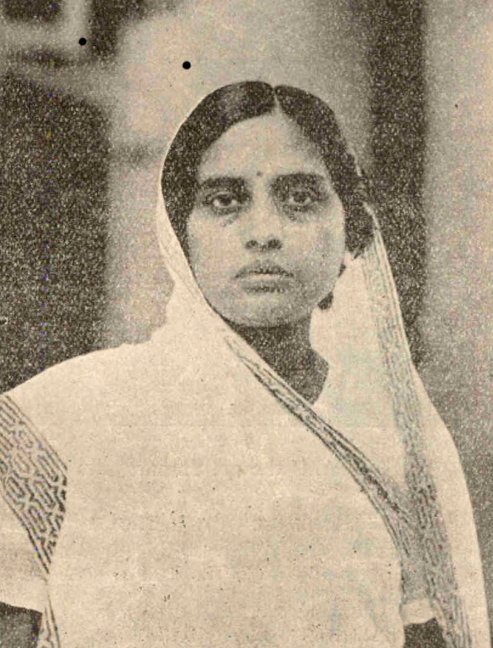
- Premchand in 1927
- Occupation(s): Social worker, suffragist, and Indian independence movement activist
- Organization: All India Women's Conference

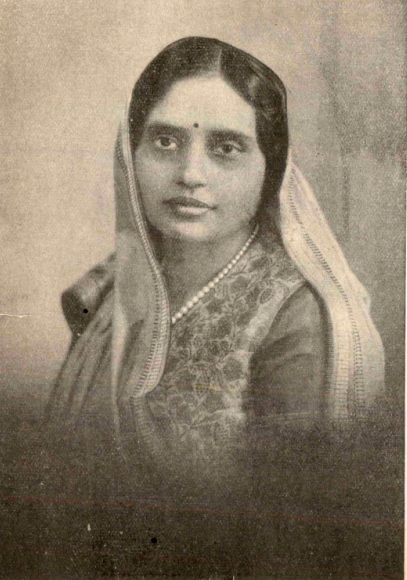
c. 1936

Taraben Maneklal Premchand was an Indian social worker, suffragist and Indian independence movement activist. She was a member of the All India Women's Conference, and was a member of a committee that authored a notable report on universal suffrage in India. She was married to industrialist Maneklal Premchand.

Premchand was active in the suffragist movement in India. Along with Rajkumari Amrit Kaur, Nallamuthu Ramamurthi, and Lakshmi Menon she publicly advocated for universal suffrage, and made a personal representation to Lord Lothian and the Simon Commission for adult franchise in India, and to grant the vote to women. She was also a member of the All India Women's Conference, and in 1931, was appointed to a committee constituted by the Conference to prepare a report on universal franchise in India. She prepared this report with Hansa Mehta, Margaret Cousins, Faiz Tyabji, Hilla Rustomji Fardoonji, Shareefa Hamid Ali, Malini Sukhtankar and Lakshmibai Rajwade, and submitted it to the Second Round Table Conference, calling for universal franchise and opposing separate electorates on the basis of gender or religion.

Premchand was also closely involved with the work of the Shraddhanand Ashram, a Hindu religious institution that helped provide care for orphaned and destitute children. In 1934, she was appointed as a trustee of the Jyoti Sangh, along with Zarina Currimbhoy, Vijayalakshmi Pandit, Lady Tanumati Girijaprasad, and Anasuyaben Ramniklal Parikh. The Jyoti Sangh was an organisation established with support from Mahatma Gandhi, to provide education, training, and employment to women in Ahmedabad, Gujarat. She was the president of the Jain Mahila Parishad, an organisation of women belonging to the Jain religion, and was instrumental in preparing a constitution for the organisation based on principles of equality. In 1938, she publicly campaigned for the closure of slaughter houses for cattle in Uttar Pradesh, on religious grounds, in accordance with views on cow slaughter in India.
