= Herabai Tata =

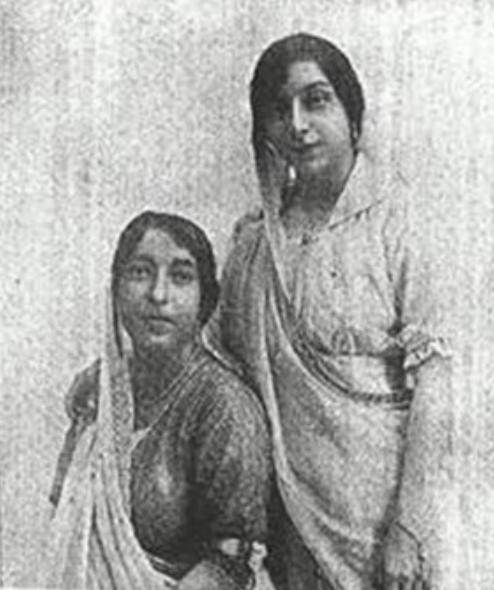
- Herabai (seated) and Mithan Tata, 1919
- Born: 1879; Bombay, British Raj
- Died: 1941 (aged 61–62)
- Other names: Herabai A. Tata, Herabai Ardeshir Tata
- Occupations: women's rights advocate, suffragist
- Years active: 1911–1920s

Herabai Tata (1879–1941) was an Indian women's rights activist and suffragist. Married in 1895, Tata's husband was progressive and supported the education of his wife and daughter, hiring tutors to help her with her schooling. In 1909, Tata, who was Parsi, developed an interest in Theosophy and within a few years made the acquaintance of Annie Besant. Around the same time, in 1911, she met Sophia Duleep Singh, a British suffragist with Indian heritage, who influenced her development as a suffragist. A founding member and the general secretary of the Women's Indian Association, she became one of the women who petitioned for enfranchisement before the Montagu-Chelmsford investigation in 1917.

When the reforms which were proposed failed to include women's suffrage, Tata and other feminists began protesting and publishing articles on the need for the vote. Referred to the Southborough Franchise Committee to develop the electoral regulations for implementing the Montagu–Chelmsford Reforms, she wrote an article for The Times of India arguing that as some municipalities already allowed women to vote, extending the right was justified. Nonetheless, the Southborough Committee also rejected the inclusion of enfranchisement for women and sent their recommendations to the Joint Select Committee of the House of Lords and Commons. Tata was chosen by the Bombay Suffrage Committee to travel to England to present the case in favor of suffrage to the Joint Committee.

Compiling a report to substantiate the claim for suffrage, Tata and her daughter Mithan made two presentations to the government and traveled throughout the country to try to gain support for their cause. She published articles in various journals and spoke, inspiring individuals and organizations to flood the India Office with endorsements. Though unable to influence the reform act to include complete suffrage for women, the final bill did allow provisions for Indian provinces to enfranchise women if they chose to do so. Once in England, Tata and her daughter enrolled in courses at London School of Economics and remained until 1924. She continued to work for voting rights and legislation protecting children until her husband was injured in an accident and required her care. Tata died in 1941 and is remembered as one of the prominent suffragists in the early struggle for the vote in India.

== Early life ==
Herabai was born in 1879 in Bombay, which at the time was in the British Raj. At the age of sixteen, she was married to Ardeshir Bejonji Tata (Note: Some references indicate that her husband was from the influential, industrialist Tata family, while others disclaim the familial relationship.) an employee at a textile mill. The family were Parsis. On 2 March 1898 the couples' daughter, Mithan was born in Maharashtra. They soon moved to Phulgaon, near Nagpur, where Ardeshir worked at a textile mill as an assistant master weaver. He was progressive in his thoughts on women's education and hired tutors to help Tata in her wish to further her education. Taking a position in a mill in Ahmedabad, the family remained there until 1913, when they relocated to Bombay, where Ardeshir became manager of a large textile mill.

== Activism ==
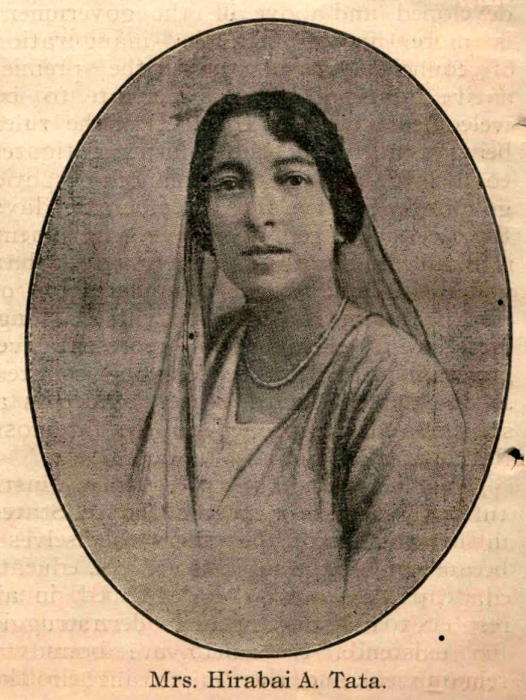

=== Early activism ===
In 1909, Herabai became interested in Theosophy and began attending conventions in Adyar, Madras and Benaras. At the 1912 convention in Benaras, she met Annie Besant, who had become president of the Theosophical Society Adyar in 1908. In 1911, while vacationing in Kashmir with her daughter, Tata met the suffragist, Sophia Duleep Singh. Charmed by her enthusiasm for the cause and after reading the literature Singh later sent, Tata became active in the fight for women's enfranchisement. In 1916, discussions about Indian Home Rule began to escalate and the Montagu investigations began. Edwin Montagu, Secretary of State for India, and Lord Chelmsford, Viceroy of India traveled to the country with the aim of soliciting opinion on a limited political devolution of British power.

In 1917, Margaret Cousins founded the Women's Indian Association in Adyar to create a vehicle for women to influence government policy. Besant and Tata were both founding members, along with other women. Besant served as the president and Tata was named as the general secretary of the organization. Cousins secured an audience with Montagu to present the political demands of women. On 15 December 1917, Sarojini Naidu led a deputation of 14 leading women from throughout India to present the call to include women's suffrage in the new Franchise Bill under development by the Government of India. As part of the delegation, Tata made an impassioned plea for women to be included as "people" and not prohibited from voting as if they were foreigners, children or lunatics.

Despite their efforts, when the Montagu–Chelmsford Reforms were introduced in 1918 no recommendation was made for women's enfranchisement. Suffragists prepared petitions and submitted them to legislatures and conferences and published updates about the struggle in Stri Dharma, urging support for women's political empowerment as a part of the anti-colonial movement against Britain. As the next step of the process, the Southborough Franchise Committee was formed to develop the electoral regulations for implementing the Montagu–Chelmsford Reforms. Their report issued in April 1919 also rejected including women's suffrage, as they felt the conservative society would be against it. Tata published her rationale for women's enfranchisement in The Times of India in June, arguing that as women already could vote in Bombay municipal elections, extending the vote was not a novel idea. In July women in Bombay organized a protest meeting at which Tata spoke. When Lord Southborough sent his report to the Joint Select Committee of the House of Lords and Commons, the Bombay Committee on Women's Suffrage (Note: This committee is variously given as an entity from the All India Home Rule League, the Bombay Women's Suffrage Union, or the Women's Indian Association.) decided to send Tata and her daughter Mithan to give evidence along with Sir Sankaran Nair.

=== Move to England ===
The Bombay Suffrage Committee financed the trip with funds provided by Tata Limited, but as all of the expenses were not covered, Tata's husband, Ardeshir, who encouraged her to go, provided the remaining funds needed. She wrote to influential people in a wide range of organizations to gain their support for the cause and was an active speaker at events. Mother and daughter compiled numerous reports on women's franchise to substantiate their case in favor of granting women the vote. Besant and Naidu presented pleas for enfranchisement in August. In September 1919, Tata presented the memorandum Why Should Women Have Votes to the India Office. While in England, the Tatas spoke at various public meetings and events of British suffragists, traveling to "Birkenhead, Bolton, Edinburgh, Glasgow, Harrowgate, Liverpool, Manchester and Newcastle" to gain the support of other women. They were very successful in their pleas which resulted in the India Office being inundated with resolutions of support for women's suffrage in India. She also sent regular correspondence to Jaiji Petit, chair of the Bombay Committee on Women's Suffrage. Tata and her daughter participated in a second presentation before the Joint Select Committee on 13 October. They were also present for the final reading of the bill in December 1919, which included a clause that Indian provinces could enfranchise women if they chose to do so.

Initially planning to stay through the end of the year, Tata and her daughter decided to remain in England when Mithan was accepted for post graduate studies at the London School of Economics. Tata also enrolled at the school and though she did not obtain a degree, she took courses between 1919 and 1922 in administration, economics, and social science. During her time in England, Tata worked actively to develop support for women's political identity. She published articles in various journals, like The Vote and United India. These activities were not always appreciated in India, as she drew criticism from Young India, when an article published in 1920 alleged that she was not fighting British colonialism, but rather seeking help from their colonizers. That year, she participated in the 8th Congress of the International Woman Suffrage Alliance (IWSA) held in Geneva, Switzerland. In 1923, she was a delegates to the 9th IWSA Congress in Rome. Though not elected, Tata was proposed as a member of the international board, which was the first time Indian women could qualify for administrative positions in the organization.

=== Return to India ===
In 1924, Tata and her daughter returned to India. That year, she organized a public conference with various women's groups to provide input on a pending bill for children. Among the suggestions sent to the government were provisions to allow women to participate in drafting the act, increased penalties for "forcing a girl into immorality", recognition of women as parents on par with men, and placing women magistrates on the Children's Courts. In 1925, when the National Council of Women in India (NCWI) was formed, Tata joined along with her daughter Mithan. An injury which caused Ardeshir to lose his sight, curtailed her ability to participate as actively as she had formerly, as she became his caregiver.

== Death and legacy ==
Tata died in 1941. Much of her legacy was overshadowed by her more famous daughter, but writer and activist Rita Banerji said Tata was one of the central figures in the fight for suffrage in India. Geraldine Forbes, distinguished teaching professor of history and director of the women's studies department at the State University of New York at Oswego, called Tata the "real soldier" in the campaign for women's enfranchisement in India.
