= Bandhan Tod =

Mobile app

- Type: Mobile App
- Official language: Hindi English
- Key people: Prashanti Tiwari, Anis Bari
- Website: genderalliance.org.in

Bandhan Tod is a mobile app to stop child marriage in India's Bihar state through SOS button in the app. When the SOS on Bandhan Tod is activated, the nearest small NGO will attempt to resolve the issue. If the family resists, then the police gets notified. Till now so many child marriages has been cancelled through Bandhan Tod interventions.

Bandhan Tod is an initiative of Gender Alliance managed by Prashanti Tiwari to support the state government's efforts to end child marriage and dowry.
