= Lakshmibai Rajwade =

Indian medical doctor, family planning advocate, and suffragist

Rani Lakshmibai Rajwade
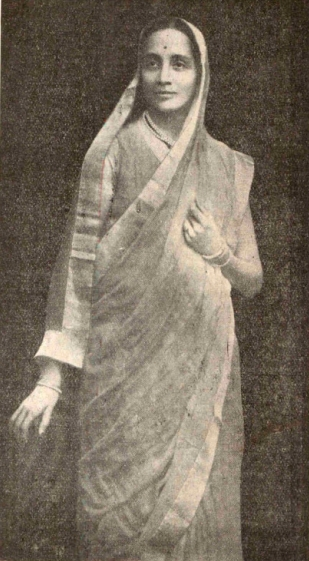
- Born: c. 1887
- Died: 1984
- Education: Grant Medical College
- Occupations: medical doctor, family planning advocate and suffragist
- Organization: All-Asian Women's Conference
- Father: Moropant Vishvanath Joshi

Rani Lakshmibai Rajwade (née Joshi, 1887–1984) was an Indian medical doctor, feminist, and family planning advocate. She was also a suffragist and advocate for the right of women to vote in India, and presided over the All India Women's Conference as well as acting as its secretary. She was the author of an influential report on the role of women in the Indian economy in 1938, as well as a driving force in the adoption of family planning measures as part of the agenda of the Indian independence movement. Rajwade also represented India internationally, at the United Nations and helped establish links between Indian women's organizations and international women's organizations.

== Life ==
Lakshmibai Rajwade was born as Lakshmi Joshi in 1887 to Sir Moropant Vishvanath Joshi, a lawyer, and political activist from the Central Provinces and Berar, and Lady Yashodabai Joshi. She studied medicine at the Grant Medical College in Bombay, and continued her education in England, with the support of Gopal Krishna Gokhale. She married Major General C. R. Rajwade, the erstwhile noble of the Gwalior state, and was given the title of 'Rani' (queen) of Gwalior. Rajwade was a widower, and she adopted his six children, consisting of four sons and two daughters. She died in 1984.

== Work ==
Rajwade practised medicine in Bombay throughout her career.

She was also closely involved with feminist advocacy and women's rights organizations, and particularly advocated for the right of women to vote in legislative councils in colonial India. In 1917, Rajwade, along with Sarojini Naidu, Annie Besant, and S. Naik, were given a private interview with Edwin Montagu and Viscount Chelmsford, the Viceroy of India, after they circulated a memorandum on suffrage amidst proposals for the Montagu-Chelmsford Reforms. During this interview, they described the lack of women in legislative councils as "deplorable" and argued for their inclusion in electoral processes. In 1931, she was a member of a drafting committee within the All India Women's Conference, chaired by Sarojini Naidu, and consisting of Hansa Mehta, Taraben Premchand, Margaret Cousins, Faiz Tyabji, Hilla Rustomji Fardoonji, Shareefa Hamid Ali, Malini Sukhtankar and herself. They submitted a report to the Second Round Table Conference, calling for universal franchise and opposing affirmative action for women in the electoral process.

In 1932, Rajwade was also active in efforts to establish collaborations and links with feminist organizations and movements outside India, and particularly within Asia. Along with Margaret Cousins, she was one of the early founders of the All-Asian Women's Conference. In this context, Rajwade was an active opponent of colonialism, arguing in a speech at the All India Women's Conference in 1931 that support should be extended to the right of all nations to self-determination.

Rajwade was closely involved with the work of the All India Women's Conference, and in 1931 gave a notable speech on family planning to the conference, first proposing the adoption of a resolution to create a "committee of medical women to study and recommend ways and means of educating the public to regulate the size of their families." The resolution did not succeed, but Rajwade continued to organize support for the involvement of women in family planning at the Conference through 1932, and in 1933, the resolution was finally adopted. In 1935, Rajwade was the Honorary Secretary of the All India Women's Conference, and at Margaret Cousins' urging, invited birth control advocate and educator Margaret Sanger to lecture at the conference. Despite opposition to her speech, Cousins was able to speak at the Conference, advocating for the All India Women's Conference to take a more active role in family planning. From 1939 to 1940, Rajwade was the president of the All India Women's Conference.

In 1938, Rajwade chaired the Subcommittee on Women, in the Indian National Congress' National Planning Committee. As chair, she authored and published a widely circulated report on family planning in 1940, which explicitly advocated for the use of measures to control reproduction and supported the recognition of female contributions to the economy. The report, which has been described as "remarkably modernist" by scholar Mary E. John, argued for the recognition of the economic rights of women, including their contributions to the economy through unpaid domestic labour. It received some opposition from members of the national movement, with Jawaharlal Nehru writing to Rajwade that public opposition to the subject of family planning would be harsh, and stating "One has to approach the subject in a manner which is least offensive to large sections of people."

In 1938, as well, Rajwade gave a notable speech at the All India Women's Conference, opposing communalisation, and calling for the women's movement to promote secularism. She said, "I am confident that the women’s unity will be the ultimate means of bringing about a brotherly understanding and even active co-operation among the seemingly divided communities of this land." In 1933, Rajwade had previously written to the British government on behalf of the All India Women's Conference, opposing the Communal Award, which established separate electorates in India on the basis of religion. In 1950, Rajwade was one of three Indian delegates to the United Nations Economic and Social Council.
