= Dorothy Jinarajadasa =

English feminist, suffragette and writer

Dorothy Jinarajadasa (born Dorothy May Graham; 19 March 1881 - 13 January 1963) was an English feminist, suffragette, and writer based in India. Along with Margaret Cousins and Annie Besant, she established the Women's Indian Association in 1917, and was active in efforts to end child marriage and female illiteracy in India. She was a justice of the peace for Madras, and an active Theosophist. She is one of the earliest members of the suffragist movement in India, and is known for her efforts to build transnational networks between suffrage movements.

== Biography ==
She was born as Dorothy May Graham in the United Kingdom, and married Sri Lankan Theosophist, Curuppumullage Jinarajadasa on 11 November 1916. They had met in Adyar, in meetings of the Theosophical Society, and had traveled back to London to be married.

== Career ==
Jinarajadasa was active in efforts to establish suffrage for women in the United Kingdom as well as in India, and was arrested (but not charged) for her participation in protests for the British suffrage movement.

In 1917, she established the Women's Indian Association (WIA) along with Margaret Cousins and Annie Besant. The organization was conceived of by Cousins and Jinarajadasa, who met at the Theosophical Society in Adyar, where Jinarajadasa and her husband were living, and where she served as a justice of the peace. The initial purpose of the organization was to encourage women's sports, as well as to promote women's education and craft. Once established, Jinarajadasa reached out to the Theosophical Society to invite them to establish similar branches of the Women's India Association across India. Through her efforts, forty-three additional branches were established over the following year. Jinarajadasa served as the first secretary of the organization. The WIA was very politically active, advocating against child marriage, engaging in philanthropy, and supporting suffragist efforts. In 1918, Cousins and Jinarajadasa founded Stri Dharma, a women's magazine that they edited, and which carried articles concerning women's welfare, and Jinarajadasa contributed extensively to the magazine as well as editing it. Jinarajadasa had previously established a smaller women's organisation in Madanapalle. Along with Hannah Sen, Jinarajadasa advocated for the involvement of Indian women in the suffrage movement, and protested against Western misrepresentations of Indian religious and cultural practices.

In 1917, Jinarajadasa was part of a delegation of women, including Cousins, Sarojini Naidu, Annie Besant, Herabai Tata and others, to address Sir Edwin Montagu, the secretary of state for India, on a proposal to extend the vote for women. Although their efforts were unsuccessful at the time, they received wide attention in the Indian and English press and were soon supported by demands for suffrage from other organizations, including the Indian National Congress. In 1918, at the Malabar District Conference of the Indian National Congress, Jinarajadasa successfully moved a resolution in support of female suffrage, which was passed unanimously. Through 1918, she was in regular correspondence with Constance Villiers-Stuart, who was advocating in England for the inclusion of women in the Indian electorate. In April 1921, when the franchise was extended to women in the Madras Presidency, Jinarajadasa was one of several women who attended the debates. Writing in Sri Dharma, she contrasted the Indian experience of suffrage to her experiences in Britain, where the suffrage movement had been received with violence and arrests.

As part of her efforts to promote suffrage, Jinarajadasa worked to establish links between women's organisations across the world. While traveling with her husband between Vienna and Madras, she visited a number of such organizations along the way, and particularly, addressed meetings for women in Basrah, Iraq. In the 1920s, she also toured Australia, interacting with Australian suffragists, and addressing a number of public gatherings, including the National Council of Women in Brisbane in September 1919; the National Council of Women in Australia in Melbourne in October 1919; and the Australian Women's National League in October 1919. Her efforts were matched by suffragist women's organizations reaching out to establish links in India; for instance, in 1921, members of the Women's International League for Peace and Freedom reached out to her about drawing in Indian members. In 1921, Jinarajadasa published a pamphlet with the Women's Indian Association titled Why Women Want the Vote, in which she advocated for the building of networks between suffrage movements in the Commonwealth. In 1923, she was a delegate for India at the conference of the International Alliance for Women, and addressed the conference on the issue of Indian suffrage in widely reported speech.

In 1934, Jinarajadasa led early efforts to raise the age of marriage and consent for women to 16, in the Madras Presidency. She prepared a letter in support of a bill to raise the age, and circulated it across political leaders in India, drawing letters of support, including one notably from Mahatma Gandhi.

Along with her husband, Curuppumullage Jinarajadasa, she was an active Theosophist. She died in London, aged 81, in 1963.

== Publications ==
- Dorothy Jinarajadasa, Why Women Want the Vote (Adyar: Women's Indian Association, 1921)
- Dorothy Jinarajadasa, 'The Women's Suffrage Resolution', Stri Dharma (October 1918): 53
- Dorothy Jinarajadasa, 'The Emancipation of Indian Women', Transactions of the Eighth Congress of the Federation of European National Societies of the Theosophical Society held in Vienna July 2 to 26 1923, ed. C. W. Dijkgraaf (Amsterdam: Council of the Federations, 1923), 82–8
