= Masuma Begum =

Indian politician, social worker and feminist

President, All India Women's Conference 1962

Deputy Leader, Indian National Congress, 1957

Personal details
- Born: 8 October 1902 Hyderabad, Andhra Pradesh, India
- Died: 2 March 1990 (aged 87) Hyderabad, Andhra Pradesh, India
- Party: Indian National Congress
- Cabinet: Andhra Pradesh State Government, 1960
- Portfolio: Social Welfare and Religious Endowments
- Awards: Padma Shri, 1974

Masuma Begum (8 October 1902 – 2 March 1990) was an Indian politician, social worker, and feminist. She was a member of the Indian National Congress party, serving as their deputy leader, and was active in politics in Andhra Pradesh, becoming a member of the cabinet in 1960. She was the President of the All India Women's Conference in 1962, and worked towards building networks with international feminist organizations, advocating family planning, and working with social welfare organizations in Hyderabad. She was an early public advocate for the end of the social seclusion of Indian women, a practice known as purdah. She was a recipient of the Padma Shri, one of India's highest civilian honors, in 1974.

== Early life ==
Begum was born in Hyderabad in 1902. She and her sisters attended Mahbubiya Girls' School.

== Career ==
Begum began her career with charitable work in Hyderabad, and later joined the Indian National Congress party. She won her first election in 1952, joining the Andhra Pradesh Legislative Assembly from the Hyderabad constituency. In 1957, she was appointed Deputy Leader of the Congress Party, and in 1960, she became a Minister for Social Welfare and Religious Endowments in the Andhra Pradesh government.

Begum was involved with the All India Women's Conference (AIWC) a feminist organisation dedicated to women's rights and interests, since 1927, and served as its vice-president twice. In 1957, she took charge of the AIWC's international relations and outreach, and in 1962, she was appointed as AIWC's president. During her time in the AIWC, she led a delegation to the Golden Jubilee of the International Alliance of Women in Colombo in 1955; in 1959, she was elected as a member of the interim committee of the United Nations' Second Conference of Non-Governmental Organisations in Geneva, and also led AIWC delegations to international feminist conferences in Yugoslavia and Indonesia.

Begum was active in efforts to implement family planning in India. In the 1970s, the Government of India had appointed a committee to examine the question of legalizing abortions in India, and along with Avabai Wadia, Begum served on the committee, and legislation towards this was introduced in 1972. She was one of several Muslim leaders who defended and advocated for the Sarda Act, which criminalised the practice of child marriage in India.

In Hyderabad, Begum was closely involved with a number of social welfare organisations. She was appointed the chair of the Central Social Welfare Board in Hyderabad, a government organisation, and also served on the boards of several non-government organisations, including the Red Cross, Lady Hydari Club, and Anjuman-e-Khawateen, an organisation that she launched to promote education for Muslim women.

In 1974, she was a recipient of the Padma Shri, a civilian honor awarded by the Indian government.

== Personal life ==
Begum married her cousin, Husain Ali Khan, who studied at Oxford and later headed Osmania University. Although she had been raised in a household where women were in purdah (seclusion), her husband encouraged her to abandon the practice of seclusion, and she gradually did so, becoming an advocate against it. After India attained independence, she entirely stopped wearing a burqa or maintaining purdah. Begum spoke and read Persian, Urdu, and English with fluency.
