= Premchand (disambiguation) =

Premchand (1880–1936) was an Indian writer.

Premchand may also refer to:

- Premchand Aggarwal, Indian politician
- Premchand Degra, Indian bodybuilder
- Premchand Guddu, Indian politician
- Premchand Roychand, Indian businessman
- Manek Premchand, Indian writer and historian
- Taraben Premchand, Indian independence activist
