= Child marriage among Muslims in Kerala =

Marriage in Kerala, India

The issue of child marriage among Muslims in Kerala was addressed by a circular issued on 14 June 2013 by the social-welfare department of the Indian Union Muslim League (part of Kerala's ruling United Democratic Front (UDF)). The circular instructs marriage registrars to register Muslim marriages even if the parties have not attained the age fixed by the Prohibition of Child Marriage Act, 2006. Political parties and Muslim women's organisations have said that this would encourage child marriages. Following an amendment, only underage marriages occurring before 28 June 2013 could be registered. Nine prominent Muslim organisations in Kerala took legal action seeking exemption from the community marriage-age restrictions, saying that the minimum marriage age for women (fixed at 18 by the Child Marriage Act) as well as its Supreme Court endorsement infringe on the Muslim law.

== Background ==
The Indian Union Muslim League (IUML) opposes the Child Marriage Act on the grounds that it contravenes the Muslim personal law. According to a survey by the Integrated Child Development Scheme, of the 3,400 girls aged 13 to 18 married in Malappuram, Kerala in 2012, 2,800 were Muslims. In 2008, 4,249 of the 4,955 brides in child marriages were Muslims. Although most Muslim religious organisations and clerics have defended the government circular, Muslim women have opposed it.

== Examples ==
A 28-year-old United Arab Emirates (UAE) citizen, Jasem Mohammed Abdul Karim Abdulahmed, married a 17-year-old girl from an orphanage in Malappuram on 13 June 2013. He left the country after two weeks, divorcing her by telephone with a triple talaq. Outrage over child marriage is believed to have been triggered by this incident, and the Kerala High Court later halted the marriage of a 14-year-old girl from Kannur.

== Film ==
Aryadan Shoukath's film on the topic, Paadam Onnu: Oru Vilapam, received national acclaim.

== Opposition ==
The Students' Federation of India organised meetings at colleges across the state to protest the move by Muslim organisations to legally challenge the minimum age of marriage, demonstrating their opposition by wearing gags. Communist Party of India (Marxist) state secretary Pinarayi Vijayan said that the IUML was trying to polarise the community to influence Lok Sabha elections and deny educational rights to Muslim girls by lowering their marriageable age. Opposition leader and former Chief Minister of Kerala V. S. Achuthanandan condemned the move by some Muslim organisations to reduce the marriageable age of Muslim girls, and the Kerala Women’s Commission has also condemned child marriage.
