= Mithan Jamshed Lam =

Indian lawyer and women's rights activist

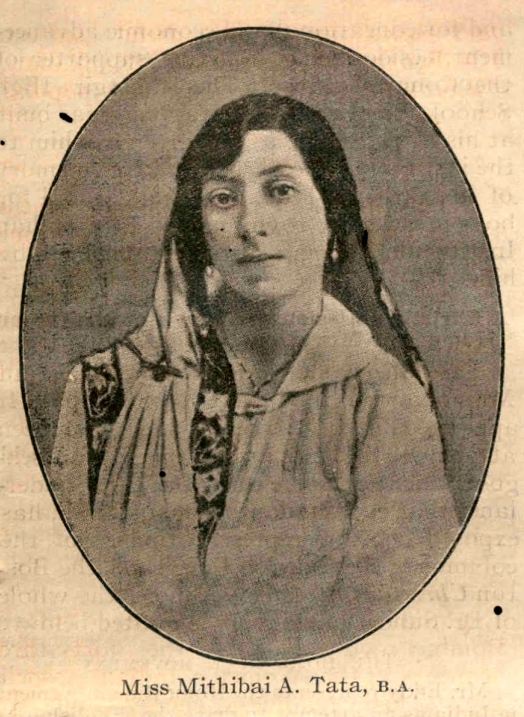
- Born: 2 March 1898; Maharashtra, British Raj
- Died: 1981
- Occupations: Lawyer; Social activist
- Years active: 1919–1981
- Known for: Women's rights
- Spouse: Jamshed Sorabsha Lam
- Children: Sorab Jamshed Sorabsha Lam
- Parent(s): Ardeshir Tata; Herabai Tata
- Awards: Padma Bhushan; Cobden Club Medal

Mithan Jamshed Lam (1898–1981) was an Indian lawyer, social activist and the Sheriff of Bombay. She was the first Indian woman barrister and the first Indian woman lawyer at the Bombay High Court. She was a member of the All India Women's Conference and served as its president in 1961–62. The Government of India awarded her the third highest civilian honour of the Padma Bhushan, in 1962, for her contributions to society.

== Biography ==
Mithan Jamshed Lam, née Mithan Ardeshir Tata, was born on 2 March 1898 in the western Indian state of Maharashtra, in a Parsi Zoroastrian family, to Ardeshir Tata, a textile mill employee and Herabai Tata, a women's rights activist. Her childhood and early education were at Phulgaon, in Pune district, where her father was working at a local textile mill, but later, she moved to Ahmedabad when her father shifted his job to that place. Soon, she came to Bombay, where she joined Frere Fletcher School (present-day J.B. Petit High School for Girls) to complete her school education. Her graduate studies were at Elphinstone College, Bombay and she secured her degree in economics with honours, winning the Cobden Club Medal, for standing first in Economics. It was during this time, she accompanied her mother to London for appearing before the Southborough Franchise Committee, headed by Francis Hopwood, 1st Baron Southborough. During the visit, she also had opportunity to discuss the topic of Woman suffrage in India with the members of the House of Commons. Deciding to stay in England, she joined London School of Economics to successfully complete her master's degree, simultaneously studying law to qualify as a Barrister-at-Law of Lincoln's Inn in 1919, becoming one of the first woman barristers and the first Indian woman barrister. Her stay in England also gave her opportunities to get associated with notable Indian woman leaders such as Sarojini Naidu and Annie Besant, who were also there in the country to advocate for woman suffrage in India. She visited Scotland, along with these leaders, and also addressed the House of Commons. The efforts were reported to have assisted in getting the suffrage to Indian women.

On her return to India in 1923, Lam joined Bombay High Court as the first woman lawyer in its history, and started practice as an associate of Bhulabhai Desai, a leading lawyer and a freedom activist. After three years of practice, she was appointed as a Justice of the Peace and executive magistrate as well as a member of the committee on Parsi Marriage Act of 1865, which helped her to contribute to the amendment of the act that came to be known as the Parsi Marriage and Divorce Act of 1936. In 1947, she was appointed as the Sheriff of Bombay, first woman to hold the post. She was also involved in the activities of the All India Women's Conference (AIWC) and served as its president for the term 1961–62. She was the editor of Sthri Dharma, the official journal of AIWC for five years and served as the appointed member of the organization for United Nations Affairs. She was also active with the National Council of Indian Women, founded two years prior to AIWC, in 1925, and was a member of its legislative, labour and press committees.

Lam served as visiting faculty at the Bombay Law College and her contributions were also reported in the drafting of Hindu Code Bills. She was the founder-president of the Indian Federation of Women Lawyers, a vice-president of the International Federation of Women Lawyers (IFWL) and chaired the 13th convention of IFWL, besides serving as the representative of the federation at the United Nations. She also served as the president of the Women Graduates Union of Bombay. After her retirement from legal practice, she joined Maharashtra State Women's Council (MSWC) and chaired the Sub-committee of Labour for a period, during which time, she initiated efforts to establish primary medical centre, nursery school and vocational training centre for the slum dwellers of Matunga Labour Camp as well as providing them with water and electricity. When she assumed the responsibility of the president of the organization, she was also inducted as the chairperson into the Women's Committee on Relief and Rehabilitation of Refugees from Pakistan, an agency established in the wake of the Partition of India. She participated in several international conferences including the Asian Workshop of the Committee of Correspondence, held in US. The Government of India awarded her the civilian honour of the Padma Bhushan in 1962.

Mithan Lam was married to Jamshed Sorab Lam, a lawyer and notary public and the couple had two children. The daughter died young and the son, Sorab Jamshed Sorabsha Lam, popularly known as Soli, who died in 2010, was an orthopedic surgeon, a Fellow of the Royal College of Surgeons of England and a Hunterian Society Award winner for pioneering fractured kneecap surgery. She became blind towards the later days of her life and died in 1981, aged 83; her husband preceding her in death by two and a half years. Her life story has been documented in her autobiography, Autumn Leaves, published by the K. R. Cama Oriental Institute. Her biography is also featured in an encyclopedic book, Encyclopaedia of Women Biography.

The Lam family has notable people in India such as Dr. Sorab Lam, Framroze Lam, Dinshaw Lam, Jamshyd D. F. Lam, Phiroze Lam, Frederick Faredoon Lam, Xenia Lam, Jiaan Lam.

== See also ==
- Sheriff of Mumbai
- All India Women's Conference
- List of members of Lincoln's Inn
