= Committee on Home Administration (British India) =

British committee which sat in India from 1918 to 1919

The Committee on Home Administration was one of three British committees which sat in India from 1918 to 1919, including also the Southborough Franchise Committee and the Feetham Function Committee. The Home Administration committee was headed by Robert Crewe-Milnes, 1st Marquess of Crewe, and recommended "the reorganistion of the Council of India, the appointment of High Commissioner for India in London, and placing of charges on account of political and administrative work of Indian office on the British exchequer."
