= Afro-Asian Women's Conference =

The Afro-Asian Women's Conference was an international women's conference, which took place in Colombo in Ceylon on 15–24 February 1958.

It is known as the first Afro-Asian Women's Conference. As an Afro-Asian international conference, it was preceded by the first Afro-Asian Peoples' Solidarity Conference in Cairo, Egypt (26 December 1957 to 1 January 1958).

It was arranged by women's groups from Ceylon, Burma, Indonesia and Pakistan. Representatives from a number of countries in Asia and Africa attended. Among them were delegates from Afghanistan, which was the first time women represented Afghanistan in public.

It was followed by the Afro-Asian Women's Conference in Cairo, Egypt, January 1961.

== See also ==
- All-Asian Women's Conference
- Second Eastern Women's Congress
