= Kriti Bharti =

Indian rehabilitation psychologist

- Born: Kriti Chopra; August 19, 1987 (age 39); Jodhpur, Rajasthan
- Education: Jai Narain Vyas University
- Organization: Saarthi Trust
- Known for: Child marriage activism

Kriti Bharti (born August 19, 1987) is an Indian rehabilitation psychologist and children's rights activist. Bharti made headlines as the first annuller of child marriage in India. She is the founder and director of Saarthi Trust, a non-profit organization that primarily rescues and ensures the recovery and welfare of child marriage victims. Bharti's team has annulled more than 41 child marriages and prevented more than 1,400 from occurring.

== Early life and education ==
Bharti was born on August 19, 1987, in Jodhpur, Rajasthan. Bharti's father abandoned her pregnant mother, Indu Chopra. This was considered a disgrace in a conservative environment, and relatives demanded that Chopra abort or remarry. Despite the pressure, Bharti's mother persisted and raised the child alone. Her mother also suffered medical complications during her pregnancy and Bharti was born prematurely at seven months.

As a child, Bharti was physically and verbally tortured by relatives who considered her cursed. One went to the extent of giving her a slow poison at 10 years old, and Bharti managed to survive but she was bedridden and paralyzed. She went through several treatments from different hospitals, until she was able to recover two years later, attributing her healing to reiki therapies.

Upon her recovery, she changed her last name to "Bharti" (Daughter of India) in an attempt to free herself from the caste system, religion and kin.

Due to the paralysis, Bharti was unable to finish fourth grade. She managed to accelerate to 10th grade as she cleared her boards.

Bharti obtained a Doctorate in Psychology at the Jai Narain Vyas University in Jodhpur.

== NGOs ==
At college, Bharti joined many NGOs and started counselling simultaneously. Her first case was a rape victim who was just 9 years old. Bharti thought that a temporary relief via counselling is ultimately pointless. The encounter prompted her to pursue.

Through the NGOs, Bharti was able to work with several street children that suffered from child labour, poverty and child marriage. After seven months, she noticed that a pressing issue among the homeless children is child marriage. Child marriage, although considered illegal in India, remained prevalent, especially in rural areas. Bharti's hometown, Rajasthan, was considered the world's epicenter of child marriage.

A report of the UNICEF in 2009, titled State of the Worlds Children, goes on further to say that 40 percent of the world's child marriages happen in India. The report also stated that 56 percent of the women surveyed in rural areas married before 18 years old.

== Saarthi Trust ==
As Bharti worked with NGOs, she noticed how they were just spreading awareness; while she believed it is essential, it is merely treating the problem at the surface level. Thus, in 2011, driven by her experience with children in NGOs, she established Saarthi Trust. Saarthi Trust works on grassroots level and ensures the rehabilitation and welfare of child marriage victims after rescue. The organization provides education, vocational training and employment opportunities to ensure the independence of the victims thereafter.

In 2012, Bharti made headlines on her first case, Laxmi Sargara. She was the first woman in India to have her child marriage nullified. Since then, Bharti and her team have been working on personally visiting villages and schools to discuss the detrimental effects of child marriage and to teach women empowerment. The organization has a helpline for underage brides and grooms to report their case. As victims reach out, Bharti's team obtains proof of the marriage and then talks to the family of both the bride and bridegroom, and then to the elders of the community in an attempt to convince them. If it fails, Bharti's team seeks legal help and takes the case to the court.

Throughout years of activism, Bharti has faced countless death and rape threats. Hidebound Hindu leaders who approve the practice of child marriage have threatened to chop her nose and gang-rape her.

Saarthi Trust has rehabilitated more than 6,000 children and 5,500 women. Since it was established in 2011, Bharti's team has annulled more than 44 child marriages and halted more than 1,400 from happening.
