= Feetham Function Committee =

The Feetham Function Committee was one of three British committees which sat in Indian from 1918 to 1919, including also the Southborough Franchise Committee and the Committee on Home Administration. The Feetham committee was headed by Richard Feetham. Its role as to meet with provincial governments and assess their response to the division of functions, and thereafter advise the British Government on what functions were to be transferred and what functions were to be reserved It recommended "the allocation of subjects between the centre and the provinces", as well as "the division of provincial subjects into the Reserved and Transferred categories."
