= Har Bilas Sarda =

Indian academic, judge and politician (1867–1955)

Dewan Bahadur Har Bilas Sarda
- Born: 3 June 1867; Ajmer, Ajmer-Merwara
- Died: 20 January 1955 (aged 87); Ajmer, Ajmer State
- Other name: Harbilas Sharda
- Occupations: Teacher, judge, legislator, social reformer
- Known for: Child Marriage Restraint Act

Har Bilas Sarda (1867–1955) was an Indian academic, judge, and politician. He is best known for having introduced the Child Marriage Restraint Act (1929).

== Early life ==
Har Bilas Sarda was born on 3 June 1867 in Ajmer, in a Maheshwari family. His father, Sriyut Har Narayan Sarda (Maheshwari), was a Vedantist who worked as a librarian at the Government College, Ajmer. He had a sister who died in September 1892.

Sarda passed his matriculation exam in 1883. Subsequently, he studied at Agra College (then affiliated with Calcutta University), and obtained a Bachelor of Arts (BA) degree in 1888. He passed with Honours in English and also studied philosophy and Persian. He started his career as a teacher at the Government College, Ajmer, in 1889. He wanted to pursue further studies at Oxford University, but abandoned his plans because of his father's poor health. His father died in April 1892; a few months later, his sister and mother also died.

Sarda travelled extensively in British India, from Shimla in the north to Rameswaram in the south, and from Bannu in the west to Calcutta in the east. In 1888, Sarda visited the Indian National Congress session in Allahabad. He attended several more meetings of the Congress, including those at Nagpur, Bombay, Benares, Calcutta, and Lahore.

== Judicial service ==
In 1892, Sarda started working at the Judicial Department of the Ajmer-Merwara province. In 1894, he became the Municipal Commissioner of Ajmer and worked on revising the Ajmer Regulation Book, the province's compendium of laws and regulations. Later, he was transferred to the Foreign Department, where he was appointed guardian to the ruler of Jaisalmer State. He returned to the Judicial Department of Ajmer-Merwara in 1902. Over the years, he served in various roles, including the Additional Extra Assistant Commissioner, the Sub-judge First Class, and a judge of Small Cause Court. He also served as the Honorary Secretary of the Ajmer-Merwara Publicity Board during World War I. In 1923, he was made the Additional District and Sessions Judge. He retired from the government service in December 1923.

In 1925, he was appointed Senior Judge of the Chief Court, Jodhpur.

== Political career ==
Sarda was elected a member of the Central Legislative Assembly in January 1924, when Ajmer-Merwara was given a seat in the Assembly for the first time. He was re-elected to the Assembly in 1926 and 1930. A member of the now-defunct Nationalist Party, he was elected its Deputy Leader in 1932. The same year, he was elected one of the Assembly's chairpersons.

He served in several committees, including:

- Petitions Committee
- Primary Education Committee
- Retrenchment Committee
- General Purposes Sub-Committee
- Standing Finance Committee
- House Committee (President)
- B. B. &. C. I. Railway Advisory Committee

As a legislator, he introduced several bills passed in the Assembly:

1. Child Marriage Restraint Act (passed in September 1929; came into effect in 1930)
2. Ajmer-Merwara Court Fee Amendment Act (passed)
3. Ajmer-Merwara Juvenile Smoking Bill (thrown out by the Council of State)
4. A bill to give the Hindu widows a right to family property (thrown out due to government opposition)

Sarda also played a role in the municipal administration. He was appointed a member of the Ajmer Municipal Administration Enquiry Committee in 1933 and was elected Senior Vice-chairman of the New Municipal Committee. He served as the President of Rajasthan, Harijan Sevak Sangh, in 1934.

Besides legislative politics, he also participated in several social organizations. In 1925, he was elected President of the All India Vaishya Conference in Bareilly. In 1930, he was elected President of the Indian National Social Conference in Lahore.

== Arya Samaj ==
Har Bilas Sarda was a follower of the Hindu reformer Dayanand Saraswati since childhood and a member of the Arya Samaj. In 1888, he was appointed President of the Ajmer chapter of the Samaj, and also President of the Pratinidhi Sabha (representative committee of the Arya Samajis) of Rajputana. In 1890, he was appointed a member of the Paropkarini Sabha, a body of 23 members appointed by Dayanand Saraswati by his will to carry on his works after him. In 1894, he replaced Mohanlal Pandya as the Joint Secretary of the Paropkarini Sabha when the organization's office moved from Udaipur to Ajmer. After Pandya's retirement, Sarda became the sole secretary of the organization.

Sarda played an important role in the establishment of a DAV school in Ajmer and later became the President of the DAV Committee of Ajmer. He also played an important role in organizing Dayanand's Birth Centenary functions in Mathura, in 1925. He was General Secretary of the group that organized a function for the semi-centenary of Dayanand in Ajmer in 1933.

== Author ==
Sarda authored the following books and monographs:

1. Hindu Superiority ISBN 9780265215074
2. Ajmer: Historical and Descriptive ISBN 9789381839119
3. Maharana Kumbha ISBN 9780267557141
4. Maharana Sanga ISBN 9781290942614
5. Maharaja Hammir of Ranthambhor

He wrote research papers for The Indian Antiquary and the Journal of the Royal Asiatic Society.

== Awards and honours ==
Sarda was awarded the following titles by the British Indian government:

- Rai Sahib, for his services in garnering support for the British government during World War I
- Dewan Bahadur (1931), for his work in the Legislative Assembly
