= Muddiman Committee =

1921 British and Indian government committee

The Muddiman Committee or the Reforms Enquiry Committee (1924) was a committee led by Sir Alexander Muddiman, organized by the British and selected Indian politicians, to meet the demand of Indian leaders in the context of Indians new Swaraj Party founded in 1923. This committee would aid in investigating the diarchy issue on the constitution as set up in 1921 under the Government of India Act 1919.

== Noteworthy members ==
- Sir Alexander Muddiman
- Sir Sivaswami Aiyar
- Dr. R. P. Paranjape
- Sir Tejbahadur Sapru
- Mohammad Ali Jinnah
- Bijoy Chand Mahtab

== The reports ==
The reports created by the committee was divided into two parts due to disagreements, the majority report and minority report.

The Majority Report declared by officials that a diarchy had not been established, has not been given a fair trial run, and so only minor changes in non-official Indians were recommended

The Minority Report declared by nonofficials that the Government of India Act 1919 had failed, and that they need a Constitution that has a permanent basis with a provision for automatic progress in the future.

Submitted in September 1925, the combination of these reports recommended the appointment of a Royal Commission.

Lord Birkenhead, the Secretary of State for India, stated that actions would be taken on the basis of the majority report.
