= Prohibition of Child Marriage Act, 2006 =

Indian law

Parliament of India
- Long title: An Act to provide for the prohibition of solemnisation of child marriages and for matters connected therewith or incidental thereto
- Citation: Act No. 6 of 2007
- Territorial extent: India
- Enacted by: Parliament of India
- Assented to: 10 January 2007
- Commenced: 1 November 2007

Legislative history
- Bill title: The Prohibition of Child Marriage Act, 2005

Related legislation
- Child Marriage Restraint Act
- Status: In force

The Prohibition of Child Marriage Act, 2006 came into force on 1 November 2007 in India. It forbids child marriages, and protects and provides assistance to the victims of child marriages.

== Historical background ==
UNICEF defines child marriage as a formal marriage or informal union before 18 years of age and considers this practice a violation of human rights. Child marriage has been an issue in India for a long time. Because of its root in traditional, cultural and religious protection it has been a hard battle to fight. According to the 2001 census, there are 1.5 millions girls in India under the age of 15 years already married. Some of the harmful consequences of such child marriage are a child's loss of opportunities for education and segregation from family and friends, sexual exploitation, early pregnancy and related health risks, child brides being more vulnerable to domestic violence, higher infant mortality rate, low weight babies, premature birth, etc.

== Objective ==
The object of the Act is to prohibit solemnization of child marriage and connected and incidental matters.

To ensure that child marriage is eradicated from within the society, the Government of India enacted Prevention of Child marriage Act 2006 by replacing the earlier legislation of Child Marriage Restraint Act 1929. This new Act is armed with enabling provisions to prohibit for child marriage, protect and provide relief to victim and enhance punishment for those who abet, promote or solemnize such marriage. This Act also calls appointment of Child Marriage Prohibition Officer for whole or a part of a State by the State government.

== About the Act ==
=== Structure of the Act ===
This Act consists of 21 sections. It extends all over India and renoncants (those who reject the local laws and accept French law) of the Union territory of Pondichery.

=== Definitions ===
The Section 2 of the Act contains definitions.

- Child: A child is a person who has not completed 21 years in case of male and 18 years in case of female.
- Contracting party: Either of the parties whose marriage is or is about to be solemnized.
- Child marriage: A marriage to which either party is a child.
- Minor: A person who is not deemed to be major under Majority Act.
- Voidable marriage: (Section 3 ) Every child marriage is voidable at the option of the contracting party who was child at the time of solemnization of marriage. A Decree of nullity can be obtained by such person by filing petition before the District court for annulment of marriage within 2 years after attaining majority. While granting a decree, the district court shall make an order directing both parties and their parents or guardians to return to the other party, money, gold, ornaments, gifts and other valuables.

=== Provision for maintenance and residence of female ===
The District Court while granting annulment of the child marriage, make an interim or final order directing the male contracting party, to pay maintenance to the female contracting party. If the male contracting party is minor, then the court shall direct the parents/guardian to the minor, to pay maintenance to the female contracting party. The female contracting party is entitled to get maintenance up to her remarriage. The amount of maintenance may be paid monthly or in lump sum. The quantum of maintenance shall be determined considering the needs of the child, life style enjoyed by her and means of income of the paying party. The District court may also issue suitable order as to the residence of female contracting party.

District court shall make appropriate order for the custody of the children of such child marriage and while making such order of custody, the court issue order taking in to account of the welfare and best interest of the child of such marriage. The court shall also make appropriate orders of maintenance and issue visitation orders also.

Child begotten or conceived of such child marriage shall be deemed to be legitimate children not withstanding such marriage is annulled by the court.

Court has power to add modify or revoke any order made under S. 3, 4 and 5, i.e., with respect to maintenance, residence, when there is change in circumstances.

For getting maintenance and residence of female contracting party or child born in such marriage and for custody of children, application can be moved before the district court having jurisdiction where

1. The defendant / child resides,
2. where marriage was solemnized or
3. where the parties last resided or
4. where the petitioner is residing on the date of presentation of petition.

=== Offences and punishment under this Act ===
1. Punishment for male adult: If an adult male who is above 18 years of age contracts child marriage, he shall be punishable with rigorous imprisonment for 2 years or with fine which may extend to one lakh rupees or both.
2. Punishment for solemnizing marriage: If a person performs, conducts, directs or abets any child marriage, he shall be punishable with rigorous imprisonment for 2 years or with fine which may extend to one lakh rupees or both.
3. Punishment for promoting / permitting solemnization of marriage: Any person having charge of the child whether parent or guardian or any other person including member of organization or association of persons who does any act to promote the passing or permit child marriage or negligently fails to prevent it from being solemnized, including attending or participating such marriage, shall be punishable with rigorous imprisonment for 2 years or with fine which may extend to one lakh rupees or both.

Offence under this Act is cognizable and non bailable.

=== When marriage is null and void ===
Marriage will be null and void in the following circumstances

1. Where minor child is taken or enticed out of the keeping legal guardian
2. By force compelled or by any deceitful means induced to go from any place
3. Is sold for purpose of marriage and go through a form of marriage or if the minor is married after which the minor is sold off or trafficked or used for immoral purpose

Such marriage shall be null and void.

=== Injunction ===
The Judicial First Class magistrate / Metropolitan Magistrate has power to issue an injunction prohibiting child marriage. Which can be done by an application from the child marriage prohibition officer or receipt of any complaint or even suo motu and if the court is satisfied that a child marriage in contravention to the Act is arranged or about to be solemnized, court shall issue injunction against any person including a member of organization prohibiting such marriage. Usually injunction is issued against any person after giving him notice and an opportunity to show cause, however, in case of urgency, the court has power to issue interim injunction without giving any notice. A person disobeying the injunction shall be punishable with imprisonment for a term which may extend 2 years and fine which may extend to 1 lakh rupees or with both. No women shall be punishable with imprisonment under this section. For preventing mass child marriage on certain days such as Akshaya Tritiya, the District Magistrate has power to stop or prevent solemnizing of child marriage and District Magistrate has even power to use minimum force so as to prevent such marriage.

Any child marriage solemnized in contravention to the injunction order issued whether interim or final shall be void ab initio.

=== Child marriage prohibition officers and their duties ===
The government shall appoint Child marriage prohibition officers over the area specified in the official gazette. Their duties are

1. To prevent child marriage by taking action.
2. To collect evidence for effective prosecution.
3. To advise the locals not to indulge in promoting or helping or allowing solemnization of child marriage.
4. To create awareness of the evil of such child marriage
5. To sensitize the community on the issue
6. To furnish periodical returns and statistics when the government may direct
7. Such other duties assigned by the Government.

The Child marriage prohibition officers are deemed to be public servant and no suit will lie on the action taken by the Child marriage prohibition officers in good faith. Child marriage Restraint Act is repealed by this new Act. There are some controversies existing regarding the marriageable age of girls, particularly Muslim girls. In Kerala, nine Muslim organizations led by the Indian Union Muslim League resolved on September 21, 2013, to move the Supreme Court to get Muslim women excluded from the Prohibition of Child Marriage Act of 2006.

== Prohibition of Child Marriage (Amendment) Bill, 2021 ==
The amendment was introduced in the Lok Sabha to raise the marriageable age for women from 18 to 21 years. In December 2021, Union Minister for Women and Child Development, Smriti Irani referred the proposed bill to a parliamentary standing committee for detailed scrutiny. This bill will override all the existing laws after being passed.

The Government of India, introduced the bill by considering the data of the National Family Health Survey (NFHS) and recommendations made by the Jaya Jaitly committee to bring uniformity in marriageable age of women at par with men.

== See also ==
- Child marriage in India
