= Child marriage in India =

Child marriages in India

Child marriage in India in Indian law is a marriage in which the bride and groom both, is less than 18 years of age. Most child marriages involve girls younger than 18, many of whom are from poor families.

Child marriages are prevalent in India. Estimates vary widely between sources as to the extent of child marriages. A 2015–2016 UNICEF report estimated India's child marriage rate at 27%. The Census of India has counted and reported married women by age, with proportion of females in child marriage falling in each 10 year census period since 1981. In its 2001 census report, India stated at least a few married girls below the age of 10, 1.4 million married girls out of 59.2 million girls aged 10–14, and 11.3 million married girls out of 46.3 million girls aged 15–19. Times of India reported that 'since 2001, child marriage rates in India have fallen by 46% between 2005 and 2009'.

During British colonial times, the legal minimum age of marriage was set at 14 for girls and 18 for boys. Child marriage was outlawed in 1929, under a law in British India. (However, the Assam Muslim Marriages and Divorces Registration Act, 1935, allowed child marriage in the Indian state of Assam, but it was repealed in 2024.) Under protests from Muslim organisations in undivided India, a Muslim personal law was passed in 1937 that allowed child marriages with consent from the child bride's guardian. After India's independence in 1947, the act underwent two revisions. The minimum legal age for marriage was increased to 15 for girls in 1949, and to 18 for females and 21 for males in 1978. The child marriage prevention laws have been challenged in Indian courts, with some domestic Muslim organizations seeking no minimum age and that the age matter be left to their personal law. Child marriage is an active political subject as well as a subject of continuing litigation under review in the highest courts of India.

Several states of India have introduced incentives to delay marriages. For example, the state of Haryana introduced the Apni Beti, Apna Dhan program in 1994, which translates to "My daughter, My wealth". It is a conditional cash transfer program dedicated to delaying under-age marriages by providing a government paid bond in her name, payable to her parents, in the amount of ₹25,000 (US$260), after her 18th birthday if she is unmarried.

== Definitions of child marriage ==
=== India ===
Child marriage is a complex subject under Indian law. It was defined by the Child Marriage Restraint Act, 1929, which set the minimum age of marriage for females to be 14 and males 18. The law was opposed by Muslims and subsequently superseded for Muslims of British India by the Muslim Personal Law (Shariat) Application Act, 1937, which implied no minimum limit and allowed parental or guardian consent in case of Muslim marriages. The 1929 law for non-Muslims was amended twice after India gained independence in 1947. In 1949, the minimum age for girls was increased to 15, and in 1978 the minimum age was increased for both genders: to 18 for females and 21 for males. The applicability and permissibility of child marriage among Muslims under the 1937 Act, under India's Constitution adopted in 1950, remains a controversial subject, with a series of Supreme Court cases and rulings.

The definition of child marriage was last updated by India with the Prohibition of Child Marriage Act, 2006, which applies to all Indians except the state of Jammu and Kashmir and the renoucants of the union territory of Puducherry. For Muslims of India, child marriage definition and regulations based on Sharia and Nikah has been claimed by some as a personal law subject but has been ruled by various courts that it applies to Muslims also. For all others, The Prohibition of Child Marriage Act of 2006 defines "child marriage" means a marriage, or a marriage about to be solemnized, to which either of the contracting parties is a child; and child for purposes of marriage is defined based on gender of the person – if a male, it is 21 years of age, and if a female, 18 years of age.

=== World ===
UNICEF defines child marriage as a formal marriage or informal union before 18 years of age, because it can lead to a lifetime of suffering for girls who are more likely to experience domestic violence or die due to complications in pregnancy and childbirth. UN Women proposes that child marriage be defined as a forced marriage because they believe children under age are incapable of giving a legally valid consent.

== Statistics ==
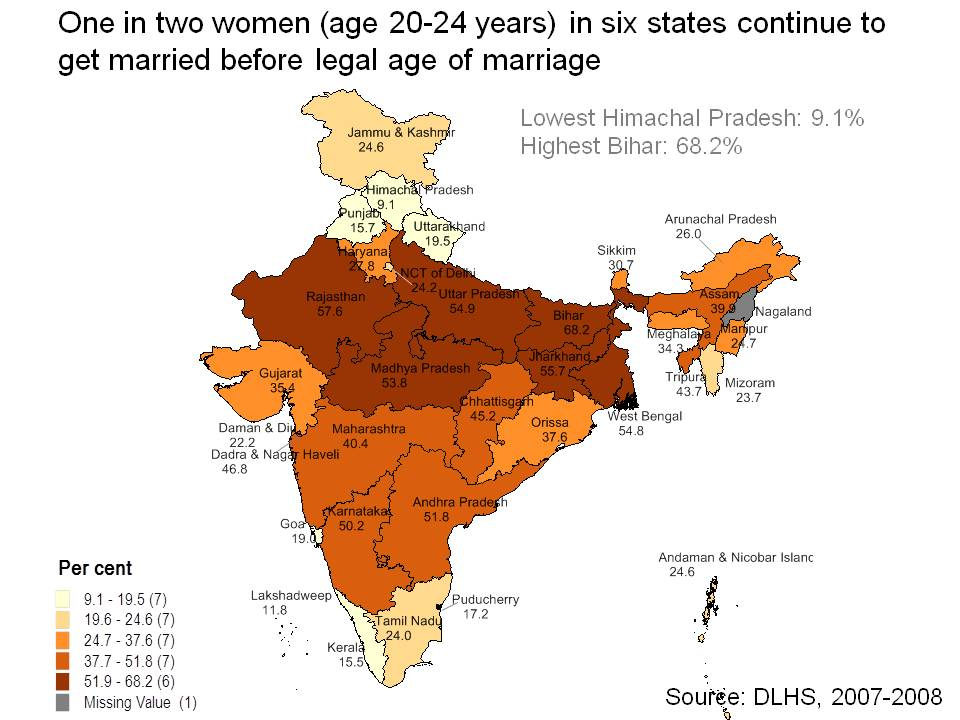
Child Marriage rates by Indian states, 2015

Child marriage rate estimates in India vary significantly among sources.

=== UN and other estimates ===
Source	% Females married (< 18)	Data Year	Sampling method	Reference
ICRW	47	1998	small sample survey	
UN	30	2005	small sample survey	
NFHS-3	44.5	1998–2002	small sample survey	
UNICEF	47	2005–06		
UNICEF	27	2020-21		
NFHS-4	26.8	2015–2016		

The small sample surveys have different methods of estimating overall child marriages in India, some using multi-year basis data. For example, NFHS-3 and NFHS-4 data for 2005 mentioned in above table, used a survey of women aged 20–24, where they were asked if they were married before they were 18. The NFHS-3 also surveyed older women, up to the age of 49, asking the same question. The survey found that many more 40–49 were married before they turned 18, than 20–24 age women who were interviewed. In the 1970s, the minimum legal age of marriage, in India, for women was 15.

According to UNICEF report published in 2005–06, child marriage rates in India were estimated to be around 47%. This figure declined to 27% in 2015–16 according to a new report published by UNICEF. UNICEF also reported that the child marriage was wide spread in three Indian states (Jharkhand, Bihar and West Bengal) and there is a 40% prevalence of child marriage in these states.

Javier Aguilar, UNICEF’s chief of child protection, stated that India accounts for the highest number of child marriages in South Asia given its size and population.

=== Indian government estimate ===
Source	% Females married (< 18)	Data Year	Sampling method	Reference
1981 census of India	43.4	1981	Nationwide census	
1991 census of India	35.3	1991	Nationwide census	
2001 census of India	14.4	2001	Nationwide census	
2011 census of India	3.7	2011	Nationwide census	

=== By states ===
The states with highest observed marriage rates for under-18 girls in 2009, according to a Registrar General of India report, were Jharkhand (14.1%), West Bengal (13.6%), Bihar (9.3%), Uttar Pradesh (8.9%) and Assam (8.8%). According to this report, despite sharp reductions in child marriage rates since 1991, 7% of women passing the age of 18 in India were married as of 2009. UNICEF India has played a significant role in highlighting the Indian child marriage rate prevalence data from its 1990s study.

According to 2011 nationwide census of India, the average age of marriage for women is 21.2. In the age group 15–19, 69.6% of all women surveyed in India had never been married.

=== Criticism ===
Several activists have expressed skepticism regarding the decline in child marriage cases in India. They believe that "the UNICEF report might not be reflecting reality on the ground and the numbers are likely not as low as they appear in the report". They state that the data relating to child marriage is colled by local government and not by UNICEF. In India, the government ask about the age of bride and groom as a part of census data, which is collected every year. However, since the people know that child marriage is illegal in India, so they are less likely to tell the authorities that they have broken the law. Dhuwarakha Sriram, child protection specialist at UNICEF India, says that "everyone knows that there is underreporting in India – even the UNICEF is aware of it". According to Sriram, people are aware of the illegal age of marriage in India, so they are less likely to tell the truth, which in turn leads to underreporting.

Kriti Bharti, who runs a non-government organization called Saarthi, says people in Rajasthan have developed ways of evading the law. For example, marriage ceremonies for underage persons will be held at night, with small groups of people attending. This reduces the chance of neighbours or relatives alerting authorities. Once the marriage has taken place, the underage bride remains with her parents until she reaches puberty. This way, even if the authorities have been tipped off, the families can deny any wrongdoing. Bharti states in addition to this, 'in some parts of India, authorities are not always interested and child marriage may be accepted as a part of the culture.

== Laws against child marriage ==
=== Child Marriage Restraint Act, 1929 ===
The Child Marriage Restraint Act, 1929, also called the Sarda Act, was a law to restrict the practice of child marriage. It was enacted on 1 April 1930, extended across the whole nation, with the exceptions of some princely states like Hyderabad and Jammu and Kashmir. This Act defined the age of marriage to be 18 for males and 14 for females. In 1949, after India's independence, the minimum age was increased to 15 for females, and in 1978, it was increased again for both females and males, to 18 and 21 years, respectively.

The punishment for a male between 18 and 21 years marrying a child became imprisonment of up to 15 days, a fine of 1,000 rupees, or both. The punishment for a male above 21 years of age became imprisonment of up to three months and a possible fine. The punishment for anyone who performed or directed a child marriage ceremony became imprisonment of up to three months and a possible fine, unless he could prove the marriage he performed was not a child marriage. The punishment for a parent or guardian of a child taking place in the marriage became imprisonment of up to three months or a possible fine. It was amended in 1940 and 1978 to continue raising the ages of male and female children.

=== Prohibition of Child Marriage Act, 2006 ===
In response to the plea (Writ Petition (C) 212/2003) of the Forum for Fact-finding Documentation and Advocacy at the Supreme Court, the Government of India brought the Prohibition of Child Marriage Act, 2006 (PCMA), and it came into effect on 1 November 2007 to address and fix the shortcomings of the Child Marriage Restraint Act, 1929. The change in name was meant to reflect the prevention and prohibition of child marriage, rather than restraining it. The previous Act also made it difficult and time consuming to act against child marriages and did not focus on authorities as possible figures for preventing the marriages.

This Act kept the ages of adult males and females the same but made some significant changes to further protect the children. Boys and girls forced into child marriages as minors have the option of voiding their marriage up to two years after reaching adulthood, and in certain circumstances, marriages of minors can be null and void before they reach adulthood. All valuables, money, and gifts must be returned if the marriage is nullified, and the girl must be provided with a place of residency until she marries or becomes an adult. Children born from child marriages are considered legitimate, and the courts are expected to give parental custody with the children's best interests in mind. Any male over 18 years of age who enters into a marriage with a minor or anyone who directs or conducts a child marriage ceremony can be punished with up to two years of imprisonment or a fine.

=== Prohibition of Child Marriage (Amendment) Bill, 2021 ===
In December 2021, the Indian Government presented a bill called the 'Prohibition of Child Marriage (Amendment) Bill, 2021' in Parliament. The purpose of this bill is to equalize the age of marriage for women with that of men by raising it to 21 years. The underlying premise of the Bill is that by increasing the age of marriage, it will eliminate the prevalence of child marriage. Shortly after the bill was introduced, Women and Child Development Minister Smriti Irani stated that the bill aims to supersede all current laws, including any traditions, customs, or practices related to marriage.

==== Applicability ====
Muslim organizations of India have long argued that Indian laws passed by its parliament, such as the 2006 child marriage law, do not apply to Muslims, because marriage is a personal law subject. The Delhi High Court, as well as other state high courts of India, have disagreed. The Delhi Court, for example, ruled that the Prohibition of Child Marriage Act, 2006 overrides all personal laws and governs each and every citizen of India The ruling stated that an under-age marriage, where either the man or woman is over 16 years old, would not be a void marriage but voidable one, which would become valid if no steps are taken by such court as has option[s] to order otherwise. In case either of the parties is less than 18 years old, the marriage is void, given the age of consent is 18 in India, sex with minors under the age of 18 is a statutory crime under Section 376 of Indian Penal Code.

Various other High courts in India – including the Gujarat High Court, the Karnataka High Court and the Madras High Court – have ruled that the act prevails over any personal law (including Muslim personal law).

=== Legal action on legal confusion ===
There is a standing legal confusion as to Marital Rape within prohibited Child Marriages in India. Marital rape per se is not a crime in India; but the position with regard to children is confusing. While the exception under the criminal law (section 375, Indian Penal Code, 1860) applicable to adults puts an exception and allows marital rape of a girl child between the age of 15–18 years by her husband. However this provision of exception has been read down by the Supreme Court of India in the case of Independent Thought v. Union of India in October 2017 and it declares that sexual intercourse with all wives below 18 years of age shall be considered as rape; another new and progressive legislation Protection of Children from Sexual Offences Act, 2012 disallows any such sexual relationships and puts such crimes with marriages as an aggravated offense.

=== CEDAW ===
The Convention on the Elimination of All Forms of Discrimination Against Women (CEDAW) is an international bill attempting to end discrimination against women. Article 16, Marriage and Family Life, states that all women, as well as men, have the right to choose their spouse, to have the same responsibilities, and to decide on how many children and the spacing between them. This convention states that child marriage should not have a legal effect, all action must be taken to enforce a minimum age, and that all marriages must be put into an official registry. India signed the convention on 30 July 1980 but made the declaration that, because of the nation's size and population, it is impractical to have a registration of marriages.

== Consequences of child marriage ==
=== Early maternal deaths ===
Girls who marry earlier in life are less likely to be informed about reproductive issues, and because of this, pregnancy-related deaths are known to be the leading cause of mortality among married girls between 15 and 19 years of age. These girls are twice more likely to die in childbirth than girls between 20 and 24 years of age. Girls younger than 15 years of age are five times more likely to die in childbirth.

=== Infant health ===
Infants born to mothers under the age of 18 are 60% more likely to die in their first year than to mothers over the age of 19. If the children survive, they are more likely to suffer from low birth weight, malnutrition, and late physical and cognitive development.

=== Fertility outcomes ===
A study conducted in India by the International Institute for Population Sciences and Macro International in 2005 and 2006 showed high fertility, low fertility control, and poor fertility outcomes data within child marriages. 90.8% of young married women reported no use of a contraceptive prior to having their first child. 23.9% reported having a child within the first year of marriage. 17.3% reported having three or more children over the course of the marriage. 23% reported a rapid repeat childbirth, and 15.2% reported an unwanted pregnancy. 15.3% reported a pregnancy termination (stillbirths, miscarriages or abortions). Fertility rates are higher in slums than in urban areas.

=== Violence ===
Young girls in a child marriage are more likely to experience domestic violence in their marriages as opposed to older women. A study conducted in India by the International Centre for Research on Women showed that girls married before 18 years of age are twice as likely to be beaten, slapped, or threatened by their husbands and three times more likely to experience sexual violence. Young brides often show symptoms of sexual abuse and post-traumatic stress.

== Prevention programmes ==
Apni Beti, Apna Dhan (ABAD), which translates to "My daughter, My wealth", is one of India's first conditional cash transfer programmes dedicated to delaying young marriages across the nation. In 1994, the Indian government implemented this programme in the state of Haryana. On the birth of a mother's first, second, or third child, they are set to receive ₹ 500, or US$11 within the first 15 days to cover their post-delivery needs. Along with this, the government gives ₹ 2,500, or US$35, to invest in a long-term savings bond in the daughter's name, which can be later cashed for ₹ 25,000, or US$350, after her 18 birthday. She can only receive the money if she is not married. Anju Malhotra, an expert on child marriage and adolescent girls said of this programme, "No other conditional cash transfer has this focus of delaying marriage... It's an incentive to encourage parents to value their daughters."

The International Centre for Research on Women will evaluate Apni Beti, Apna Dhan over the course of the year 2012, when the program's initial participants turn 18, to see if the programme, particularly the cash incentive, has motivated parents to delay their daughters' marriages. "We have evidence that conditional cash transfer programmes are very effective in keeping girls in school and getting them immunized, but we don’t yet have proof that this strategy works for preventing marriage," said Pranita Achyut, the program manager for Apni Beti, Apna Dhan. "If Haryana state’s approach proves to be valuable, it could potentially be scaled up to make a significant difference in many more girls' lives – and not only in India."

=== Bal Vivah Mukt Bharat ===
In November 2024, India's Ministry of Women and Child Development launched the national campaign Bal Vivah Mukt Bharat (Child Marriage Free India) on 27 November. The campaign adopts a whole-of-government and whole-of-society approach, with activities including public awareness, community mobilisation, strengthening the role of Child Marriage Prohibition Officers, encouraging the reporting of cases, and identifying girls at risk of child marriage or who have left school so that they can be supported to continue their education and develop skills.

On 4 September 2026, the United Nations General Assembly adopted by consensus a resolution establishing 27 November as the International Day for the Elimination of Child, Early and Forced Marriage. India was among the resolution's co-sponsors. The date coincides with the launch anniversary of the Bal Vivah Mukt Bharat campaign. The resolution encourages governments to develop and implement multisectoral national strategies to end child, early and forced marriage, and highlights education and the empowerment of girls as part of prevention efforts.

== Works ==
- The 1927 book Mother India, by American journalist Katherine Mayo, brought attention to child marriage in India, as well as criticising other aspects of Indian culture. Its publication prompted the writing of over fifty books and pamphlets in protest.

== See also ==
- Child marriage
- Teenage pregnancy
