= Solar dryer =

Device using energy for drying

Solar dryers are devices that use solar energy to dry substances, especially food. Solar dryers use the heat from the Sun to reduce the moisture content of food substances. There are two general types of solar dryers: direct and indirect.

== Direct ==
A schematic of a direct solar dryer

Direct solar dryers expose the substance to be dehydrated to direct sunlight. Historically, food and clothing was dried in the sun by using lines, or laying the items on rocks or on top of tents. In Mongolia cheese and meat are still traditionally dried using the top of the ger (tent) as a solar dryer. In these systems the solar drying is assisted by the movement of the air (wind) that removes the more saturated air away from the items being dried. More recently, complex drying racks and solar tents were constructed as solar dryers.

One modern type of solar dryer has a black absorbing surface which collects the light and converts it to heat; the substance to be dried is placed directly on this surface. These driers may have enclosures, glass covers and/or vents in order to increase efficiency.

== Indirect ==
In indirect solar dryers, the black surface heats incoming air rather than directly heating the substance to be dried. This heated air is then passed over the substance to be dried and exits upwards often through a chimney, taking moisture released from the substance with it. They can be very simple, just a tilted cold frame with black cloth to an insulated brick building with active ventilation and a back-up heating system. One of the advantages of the indirect system is that it is easier to protect the food, or other substance, from contamination whether wind-blown or by birds, insects, or animals. Also, direct sun can chemically alter some foods making them less appetizing.

Solar drying is mostly carried out between 50-70 degree Celsius. Solar dryers such as Vyom and many other models now use polycarbonate sheets or UV preventive glass so that UV rays of the sun do not penetrate the food which leads to degradation of dried food. Solar dryers not only make the drying faster, it also prevents dust, pathogens, bird droppings, and interference of external agents that affect the quality of the food. Food items such as fruits, vegetables, spices and other items once dried in solar can be stored for longer period of time.

== See also ==
- Solar cooker
