= Rameshwari Nehru =

Indian social worker (1886-1966)

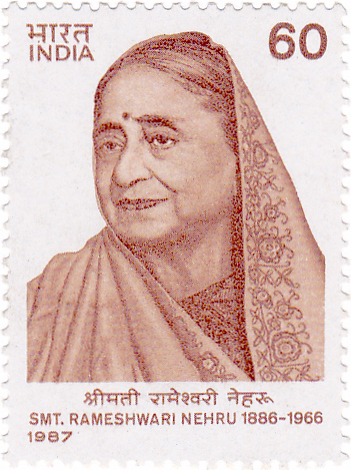
- Rameshwari Nehru on a 1987 stamp
- Born: Rameshwari Raina; 10 December 1886
- Died: 8 November 1966 (aged 79)
- Citizenship: British Indian (1886-1947); Indian (1947-1966)
- Occupation: Social worker
- Spouse: Brijlal Nehru
- Children: Braj Kumar Nehru
- Relatives: Nehru-Gandhi family
- Awards: Padma Bhushan (1955); Lenin Peace Prize (1961)

Rameshwari Nehru (née Rameshwari Raina; 10 December 1886 – 8 November 1966) was a social worker of India. She worked for the upliftment of the poorer classes and of women.

== Career ==
She edited Stri Darpan, a Hindi monthly for women, from 1909 to 1924. She was one of the founders of All India Women's Conference (AIWC) and was elected its president in 1942. She led delegations to the World Women's Congress in Copenhagen and the first Afro-Asian Women's Conference in Cairo (1961). The Schenectady Gazette reported her to be active in "communist affairs" in India and in 1954 to be chairman of the committee of Indians who opposed American military pact with Pakistan.

She was one of the signatories of the agreement to convene a convention for drafting a world constitution. As a result, for the first time in human history, a World Constituent Assembly convened to draft and adopt the Constitution for the Federation of Earth.

== Personal life ==
Rameshwari was born on 10 December 1886 in the wealthy family of Narendra Nath at Lahore. Narendra Nath (born 1864) was bestowed with "Deevan Bahadur" title in 1908 and was the first Indian to be appointed as the Commissioner of Lahore division in 1911. However, his position was taken back after Sir Reginald Craddock (the then Home Minister of India) restricted any Indians to hold the position of Commissioner. To please his ego, he was bestowed with the title of "Raja Narendra Nath". His father, Rameshwari's grandfather was Dewan Baij Nath, was also into administrative services; but died early on a pilgrimage in 1875. Her great grandfather was Dewan Ajodhia Prasad, who served as military commander under Maharaja Ranjit Singh. Later, he received jagir and monthly pension from British administration. Rameshwari had three sisters and a brother Anand Kumar.

In 1902, she married Brijlal Nehru, a nephew of Motilal Nehru and cousin of the first prime minister of independent India, Jawaharlal Nehru. Her son Braj Kumar Nehru was an Indian civil servant who served as governor of several states.

== Awards and honours ==
Nehru was awarded the Padma Bhushan by the Government of India for her social work, in 1955, and won the Lenin Peace Prize in 1961.
