= All India Women's Conference =

Indian non-governmental organisation

- Founded: 1927
- Founder: Margaret Cousins
- Type: Community service
- Location: India
- Region served: Shelter & Rehabilitation for Women in Distress, Home for Orphans & Destitute Children, Old Age home for Women
- Key people: Kalyani Raj (President)
- Website: www.aiwc.org.in

The All India Women's Conference (AIWC) is a non-governmental organisation (NGO) based in Delhi. It was founded in 1927 by Margaret Cousins in order to improve educational efforts for women and children and has expanded its scope to also tackle other women's rights issues. The organisation is the oldest nation-wide women's rights organization in India and has branches throughout the country. It is a member of the International Alliance of Women.

== History ==
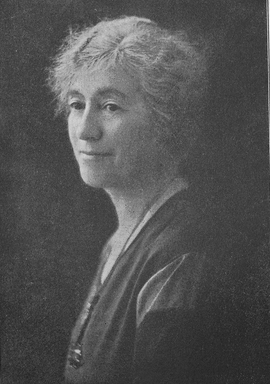
Margaret Cousins, founder of AIWC

The All India Women's Conference (AIWC) was founded in 1927 in Pune in order to promote women and children's education and social welfare. Margaret Cousins had called for the creation of an organisation as early as late 1925 by writing to other women's groups and to friends to come together to discuss education for women. The first meeting held in Poona saw 2,000 attendees who met at the Fergusson College Hall on Poona University. Most of the attendees were observers, but others were women that Cousins had brought together to help create the AIWC. Amrit Kaur was one of the founding members of AIWC. One of the first secretaries of AIWC was Kamaladevi Chattopadhyay.

Beginning in 1928, AIWC began to raise money to open the Lady Irwin College of Domestic Science. Also in 1928, the AIWC recognised that women's education couldn't be addressed properly without dealing with "harmful social customs." Women of the AIWC set up a committee to "watch and report on the progress of the Child Marriage Bill, 1929," and to also lobby politicians relating to the practice of child marriage. Other issues that were tackled included giving women the right to divorce, to inherit and to vote.

AIWC was registered in 1930 under Section XXI of Societies Registration Act, 1860. (No. 558 of 1930). AIWC created a journal, Roshni, in 1941 which was published in both English and Hindi. The organisation was involved in lobbying Parliament to pass new laws to protect women in India and also to help expand voting rights. A central office for AIWC was set up in 1946. Also in 1946, a "Skippo Committee" was set up to help provide villages with medical treatment. When India was fighting for independence, many more radical members left the organisation in order to become "nationalist agitators." The organisation also expelled members who were associated with Communist groups in 1948.

== Activities and programmes ==
One of the initial main objectives of the AIWC was education of women, and it remains a primary concern today. The organisation's literacy campaign was intensified in 1996 by initiating non-formal education programmes for school drop outs and literacy programmes for adult woman with craft training through its branches. AIWC also operates microcredit schemes and energy development for rural women. AIWC has trained women in the use of solar driers for hygienically storing food. They also help women find employment, are involved in health issues and the prevention of human trafficking.

== Past presidents ==
This is a list of the past presidents of AIWC:

- Maharani Chimnabai, 1927
- Jahan Begum of Bhopal, 1928
- Rani Lalit Kumari (Dowager Rani of Mandi), 1929
- Sarojini Naidu, 1930
- Dr. Muthulakshmi Reddy, 1931
- Sarala Roy, 1932
- Lady Vidyagauri Nilkanth, 1933
- Lady Abdul Quadir, 1934
- Hilla Rustomji Faridoonji 1935
- Maharani Sethu Parvathi Bayi, 1936
- Margaret E. Cousins, 1937
- Amrit Kaur, 1938
- Rani Lakshmibai Rajwade, 1939
- Shareefa Hamid Ali, 1940–41
- Rameshwari Nehru, 1942
- Vijayalakshmi Pandit, 1943
- Kamladevi Chattopadhyay, 1944–45
- Hansa Mehta, 1946
- Dhanvanthi Rama Rau, 1947
- Anasuyabai Kale, 1948
- Urmila Mehta, 1949–50
- Hannah Sen, 1951–52
- Renuka Ray, 1953–54
- Lakshmi N. Menon, 1955–58
- Raksha Saran, 1959–60
- Mithan Jamshed Lam, 1961–62
- Masuma Begum, 1963–64
- M.S.H.Jhabwala 1965–68
- B. Tarabai, 1969–70
- Lakshmi Raguramaiah, 1971–79
- Sarojini Varadappan, 1981–85
- Ashoka Gupta, 1986–90
- Shobhana Ranade, 1991–95
- Kunti Paul, 1996–98
- Kalavati Tripathi, 1999–2001
- Aparna Basu, 2002–2004
- Manorma Bawa, 2005–2007
- Gomathi Nair, 2008–2010
- Bina Jain, 2011–2013
- Veena Kohli, 2014–2016
- Rakesh Dhawan, 2017–2019
- Sheela Kakde, 2020–2022

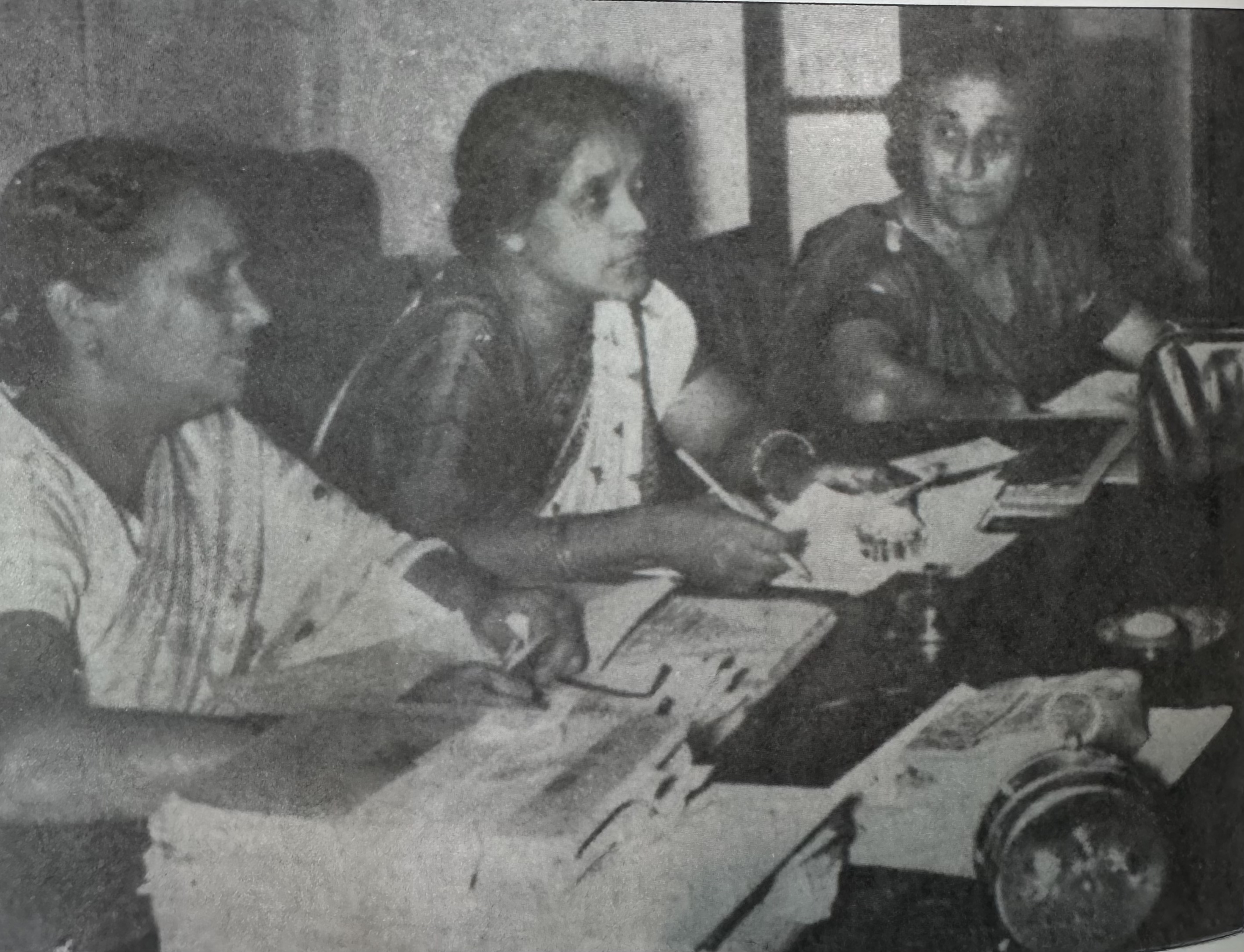
All India Women's Conference Meeting 1953. L-R: Mrs Indira Anant Maydeo (Secretary), Mrs Renuka Ray (President), Mrs Meherbeen Zhabwala (Treasurer)

== Other members ==
- Kitty Shiva Rao
- Indirabai Maydeo (Secretary 1953–54)

== See also ==
- List of women's rights organisations
- All-Asian Women's Conference
- National Council of Women in India
