= Child Marriage Restraint Act, 1929 =

1929 law in British India

Imperial Legislative Council
- Long title: An Act to define the age of marriage in India.
- Territorial extent: Whole of British Raj
- Enacted by: Imperial Legislative Council
- Enacted: 28 September 1929
- Commenced: 29 September 1929

Repealed by
- Prohibition of Child Marriage Act, 2006
- Status: Repealed

The Child Marriage Restraint Act, 1929, passed on 28 September 1929, in the Imperial Legislative Council of India, fixed the minimum age of marriage for girls at 14 years and boys at 18 years. In 1949, after India's independence, it was amended to fix the age of marriage at 15 for girls, and in 1978 at 18 for girls and 21 for boys. It is popularly known as the Sarda Act, after its sponsor Harbilas Sarda. It came into effect six months later on 1 April 1930 and applied to all of British India. It was a result of social reform movement in India. Despite strong opposition from the British authorities, the legislation was passed by the British Indian Government which had a majority of Indians. However, it lacked implementation from the British Indian government, largely due to the fear of British authorities losing support from their loyal Hindu and Muslim communalist groups.

== Legislation process ==
Various bills addressing questions regarding the minimum age of consent were introduced in the Indian legislatures and defeated. In 1927, Rai Sahib Harbilas Sarda introduced his Hindu Child Marriage Bill in the Central Legislative Assembly. Under the pressure of world opinion, the social reformists in India and Indian nationalists, the Government referred the Bill to a select committee named as the Age of Consent Committee headed by Sir Moropant Visavanath Joshi, the Home Member of Central Provinces. The other members of the committee were Arcot Ramasamy Mudaliar, Khan Bahadur Mathuk, Mian Imam Baksh Kadu, Mrs. O. Brieri Beadon, Rameshwari Nehru, Satyendra Chandra Mitra, Thakur Dass Bhargava, Maulvi Muhammad Yakub, Mian Sir Muhammad Shah Nawaz and M. D. Sagane as Secretary.

The All India Women's Conference, Women's Indian Association and National Council of Women in India, through their members developed and articulated the argument in favour of raising of the age for marriage and consent before the Joshi Committee. Muslim women presented their views to the Joshi Committee in favour of raising the age limit of marriage even when they knew that they would face opposition from Muslim Ulemas.

The Joshi Committee presented its report on 20 June 1929 and was passed by the Imperial Legislative Council on 28 September 1929 and became a law on 1 April 1930 extending to the whole of British India. It fixed 14 and 18 as the marriageable age for girls and boys respectively of all communities.

== Significance ==
The Child Marriage Restraint Act was the first social reform issue that was taken up by organized women in India. They played a major role in the development of arguments and actively used the device of the political petition and contributed to the field of politics.

Pro-reform politicians, such as Motilal Nehru, were caught off guard when the organized women's association met with leaders to ask for their support for the bill. The all-India women's association pressured politicians for their support of the bill, standing outside their delegations holding placards and shouting slogans such as 'if you oppose Sarda's bill, the world will laugh at you'. It was also this group who pushed for, and eventually succeeded in having Gandhi address the evils of child marriage in his speeches. Victory for the bill can be credited to the women's association, which presented the act as a means for India to demonstrate its commitment to modernity. Declaring they would begin to make their laws, free of male influence, the women's organization brought liberal feminism to a forefront.

Although this is a victory for the women's movement in India, the act itself was a complete failure. In the two years and five months, it was an active bill, there were 473 prosecutions, of which only 167 were successful. The list goes on with 207 acquittals, with 98 cases still pending during August 1932. Out of the 167 successful prosecutions, only 17 or so did either all of or part of their sentence. The majority of cases were in Punjab and the United Provinces.

A 1931 census was available to the public during the summer of 1933 to give a status report of how the bill was doing: the number of wives under fifteen had increased from 8.5 million to 12 million, but the number of husbands under the age of fifteen had gone from 3 to more than 5 million. The number of wives under the age of five had quadrupled (originally the numbers were about 218,500, which then shot up to 802,200). The percentage of widowed children had decreased from about 400,000 to about 320,000. Though these numbers are startling, during the six months between when it was passed and when it became an active bill, it's suggested that only about three million girls and two million boys were forced into a child marriage; the largest percentage of these marriages were between Muslim children. However, the bill's census report shows that the law reached and affected the masses, even if the numbers are very slight.

However, the Act remained a dead letter during the colonial period of British rule in India. As per Jawaharlal Nehru, this was large because the colonial British government did nothing to propagate awareness of it, especially in smaller towns and villages of India. In his autobiography, Nehru elucidates that this was large since the British did not want to earn the displeasure of the communal elements among the Hindus and Muslims. In the 1930s, the only parties in India that continued to support British rule were these collaborative groups. The British government did not wish to lose their support, hence they completely avoided implementing this and similar social reforms, instead focusing their attention on preventing the Indian freedom movement. Thus their infamous "Dual Policy" prevented any significant social reform in India.

== See also ==
- Age of Consent Act, 1891
