= Stri Dharma =

Stri Dharma, translated into English as 'The Sphere of Women', was an anti-colonial and pro-nationalist magazine of the Women's Indian Association which was first published in January 1918 by two Theosophist feminists –Margaret Cousins and Dorothy Jinarajadasa– and continued until August 1936. Dorothy Graham Jinarajadasa, Annie Besant, Margaret Cousins, Mahadeva Sastri, Srimati Patwardhan and Muthulakshmi Reddy formed the magazine's originating board. Its title was Sanskrit for the dharma of women: their right way.

== Audience ==
The magazine targeted Anglo-Indian, Indian, and British women readers.

== Content ==
It published news of women’s activities, feminist opinion pieces on topics such as women’s suffrage and equal rights, reports of conventions and analysis of new legislations that affected women in India and abroad.

== Pricing ==
Like other women's magazines of its time, Stri Dharma focussed more on recovering production costs than making a profit and focused on reaching a female audience. It was priced cheaply at 2 annas and was available in reading rooms and educational institutions. Initially, it did not publish advertisements. To manage costs, the magazine experimented with paper quality, size and frequency of publication.
