= Women's Indian Association =

Women's organisation in India, founded 1917

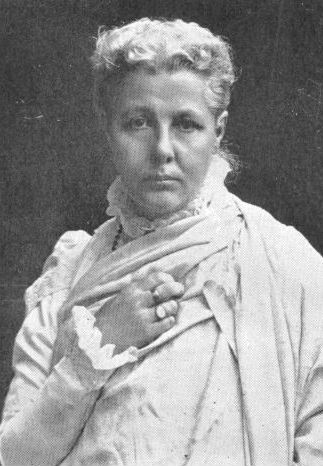
Annie Besant in 1897

The Women's Indian Association (WIA) was founded at Adayar, Madras, in 1917 by Annie Besant, Margaret Cousins, Dorothy Jinarajadasa, and others to liberate women from the deplorable condition women suffered in socio-economic and political matters during the 19th and the early 20th century. The Association later developed into a potent force to fight against illiteracy, child marriage, the Devadasi system and other social ills. After Besant's death in 1933, Dorothy Jinarajadasa became more involved in the internal politics of theosophists. The faction she supported fell from favour, and her name stopped appearing in all documents from that point onward.

== History ==
The name of the organization was chosen to indicate its inclusive makeup, allowing both Indian and European women to join, and lack of affiliation to any philosophy, religion, caste, or social class. Founded on 8 May 1917, in Adyar, Madras by Margaret E. Cousins, its first president was Annie Besant. Founding members included S. Ambujammal, Kamaladevi Chattopadhyay, Mary Poonen Lukose, Begam Hasrat Mohani, Saralabai Naik, Dhanvanthi Rama Rau, Muthulakshmi Reddy, Mangalammal Sadasivier, and Herabai Tata.

== Stri Dharma ==
The Stri Dharma was the journal published by the WIA to voice its ideals and beliefs. It addressed political and social issues facing women in India as well as the achievements of women worldwide.
