= Hilla Rustomji Faridoonji =

Indian educationist and political activist

Hilla Rustomji Faridoonji (1872–1956) was an Indian educationist and political activist.

She was secretary of the Women's Education Fund Association.

At the All India Women's Conference meeting in Madras in 1931–2, Faridoonji proposed the removal of caste distinctions and the abolition of separate schools for different religious sects. In 1935, she served as President of the AIWC, and continued as a patron on the Standing Committee of the Conference. She was a close associate of Kamaladevi Chattopadhyay and became a close friend of Mahatma Gandhi.

She was one of the first administrators of Lady Irwin College when it opened in 1932. She was its convenor and treasurer and continued to work for the college until her death. In 1954 she opened the college's postgraduate accommodation in her role as President of the All India Women's Education Fund Association. The main hall of residence is now known as the Hilla Faridoonji Hall in her memory.
