= Southborough Franchise Committee =

British committee in India

The Southborough Committee, referred to at the time as the Franchise Committee, was one of three British committees which sat in India from 1918 to 1919, including also the Committee on Home Administration and the Feetham Function Committee.

The committee was chaired by Francis Hopwood, 1st Baron Southborough, and recommended:

... a scheme of territorial constituencies, urban and rural, the latter based on the existing land revenue districts, together with communal representation for Mohammedans and Sikhs (as contemplated in the original scheme) and for Indian Christians, Europeans, and Anglo-Indians: and the representation of special interests, including commerce and industry.
