= Margaret Cousins =

Irish-indian suffragist and feminist

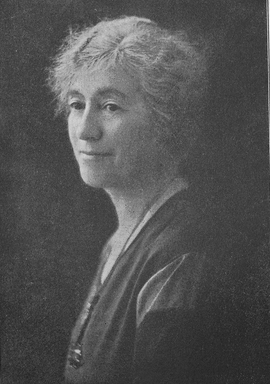
- Cousins in 1932
- Born: Margaret Elizabeth Gillespie; 17 November 1878; Boyle, County Roscommon, Ireland
- Died: 11 March 1954 (aged 75); Adyar, Madras, India
- Education: Royal University of Ireland, BMus, 1902
- Occupations: Educationist; suffragist; Theosophist
- Known for: Founder of the All India Women's Conference (AIWC); Co-founder of the Women's Indian Association (WIA)
- Spouse: James Cousins (m. 1903)

Margaret Elizabeth Cousins (née Gillespie; 7 November 1878 – 11 March 1954), known as Gretta Cousins, was an Irish-Indian educationist, suffragist and Theosophist, known for founding the All India Women's Conference (AIWC) and co-founding the Women's Indian Association (WIA).

Cousins is credited with preserving the tune of the Indian National Anthem Jana Gana Mana, and was a member of the Flag Presentation Committee which presented the National Flag to the Constituent Assembly on 14 August 1947.

== Early life and education ==
Margaret Elizabeth Gillespie was born on 7 November 1878 in Boyle, County Roscommon to Joseph Gillespie, a petty session clerk, and Margaret Annie Gillespie (née Shera). The eldest of 15 siblings, Cousins was raised in an Unionist and Methodist household.

In 1894, Cousins was awarded a scholarship to study at Victoria High School for Girls in Derry. In 1898, Cousins moved to Dublin and studied music at the Royal Irish Academy of Music before attending the Royal University of Ireland. Cousins graduated with a BMus in 1902.

== Activism ==
=== Ireland ===
Following her marriage to James Cousins in 1903, Cousins worked as a part-time music teacher. During the wedding reception Cousins announced her commitment to vegetarianism, a practice which James Cousins followed.

In 1906, after attending a National Conference of Women meeting in Manchester, Cousins joined the Irish branch of the NCW. In 1907 she and her husband attended the London Convention of the Theosophical Society, and she made contacts with suffragettes, vegetarians, anti-vivisectionists, and occultists in London.

Cousins was a vegetarian and was a speaker for the Vegetarian Society in 1907. She was also involved with the Irish Vegetarian Society. Cousins co-founded the Irish Women's Franchise League with Hanna Sheehy-Skeffington in 1908, serving as its first treasurer. In 1910 she was one of six Dublin women attending the Parliament of Women, which attempted to march to the House of Commons to hand a resolution to the Prime Minister. After 119 women marching to the House of Commons had been arrested, 50 requiring medical treatment, the women decided to break the windows of the houses of Cabinet Ministers. Cousins was arrested and sentenced to a month in Holloway Prison.

Vacationing with W. B. Yeats in 1912, Cousins and her husband heard Yeats read translations of poems by Rabindranath Tagore. In 1913, breaking the windows of Dublin Castle on the reading of the Second Home Rule Bill, Cousins and other suffragists Mabel Purser, Barbara Hoskins and Meg Connery were arrested and sentenced to one month in Tullamore Jail. The women demanded to be treated as political prisoners, and went on hunger strike to achieve release.

=== Britain ===
In 1913, Cousinses moved to Garston (present-day Liverpool) where James Cousins worked at a vegetarian food factory. During this period Cousins struggled to form ties with local suffragists.

In 1915, James Cousins secured a position in Adyar, Madras as a literary editor at the New India newspaper founded by Annie Besant, the then president of the Theosophical Society.

=== India ===
On 11 November 1915, the Cousinses arrived in Madras. James Cousins initially worked for New India before Besant was forced to dismiss him for an article praising the Easter Uprising. In 1916, Cousins became the first non-Indian member of the Indian Women's University at Poona (present-day Pune). In late 1916, the Cousinses moved to Madanapalle where Cousins taught English at Besant's newly founded Madanapalle College where James Cousins was appointed the Vice-Principal.

In 1917 Cousins co-founded the Women's Indian Association (WIA) with Besant and Dorothy Jinarajadasa. Cousins edited the WIA's journal, Stri Dharma. In 1919–1920 Cousins was the first Head of the National Girls' School at Mangalore. In 1922, she became the first woman magistrate in India. In 1927, she co-founded the All India Women's Conference, serving as its president in 1936.

In 1932, she was arrested and jailed for speaking against the Emergency Measures. By the late 1930s she felt conscious of the need to give way to indigenous Indian feminists:

I longed to be in the struggle, but I had the feeling that direct participation by me was no longer required, or even desired by the leaders of India womanhood who were now coming to the front.

She was a member of the Flag Presentation Committee, which was a committee of 74 Indian women led by Hansa Mehta at the Constituent Assembly. The committee presented the National Flag of India on behalf of the women of India to the House on 14 August 1947.

== Personal life ==
On 9 April 1903 Cousins married James Cousins, whom she had met in 1900.

A stroke left Cousins paralysed from 1943 onwards. She received financial support from the Madras government, and later Jawaharlal Nehru, in recognition of her services to India.

On the 1 March 1954 Cousins died in Adyar, Madras State (present-day, Chennai, Tamil Nadu) aged 75. Her manuscripts are dispersed in various collections across the world.

== Publications ==
- Cousins, Margaret E. (1922). The Awakening of Asian Womanhood'. Madras: Ganesh & Co.
- Cousins, Margaret E. (1935). The Music of Orient and Occident; Essays Towards Mutual Understandings. Madras: B.G. Paul & Co. Publishers.
- Cousins, Margaret E. (1941). Indian Womanhood Today. Kitabistan Series No.5. Allahabad: Kitabistan.
- Cousins, James H.; Cousins, Margaret E. (1950). We Two Together. Madras: Ganesh & Co.

== See also ==
- List of suffragists and suffragettes
- List of women's rights activists
- Timeline of women's rights (other than voting)
- Timeline of women's suffrage
- Women's suffrage organisations
