= Shareefa Hamid Ali =

Indian feminist

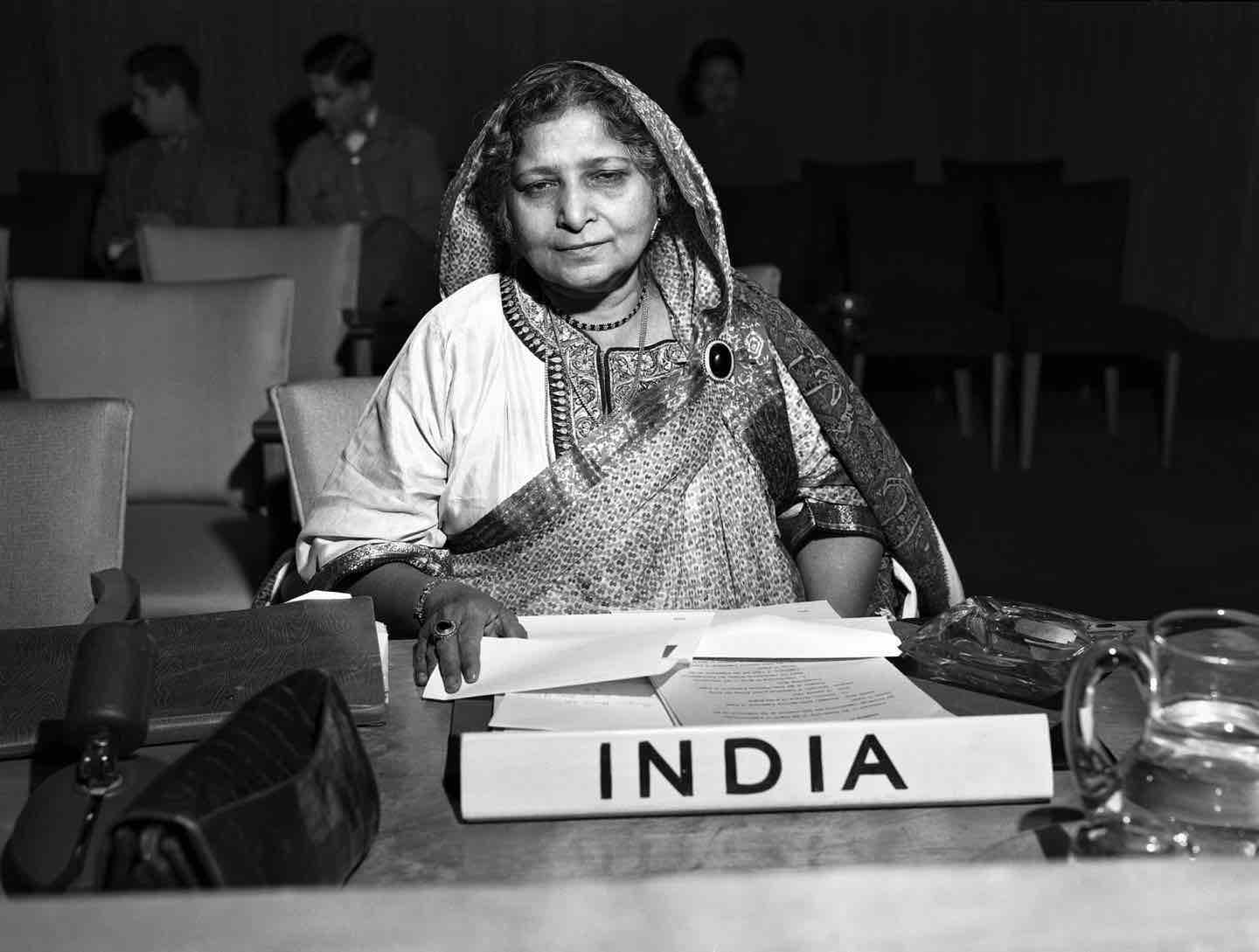
- Born: 1883; Vadodara (formerly Baroda), Gujarat, India
- Died: 1971 (aged 87–88)
- Other names: Sharifa Hamid Ali, Begum Hamid Ali
- Occupations: Political figure and advocate
- Organization: All India Women's Conference
- Spouse: Hamid Ali
- Parents: Abbas J. Tyabji (father); Ameena Tyabji (mother)
- Relatives: see Tyabji family

Shareefa Hamid Ali (c. 1883 – 1971), also known as Begum Hamid Ali, was an Indian feminist, nationalist, advocate, and political figure. She was the President of the All India Women's Conference in 1935, and one of the founding members of the United Nations Commission on the Status of Women in 1947 and debated a gender inclusive language in the Universal Declaration of Human Rights.

== Personal life ==
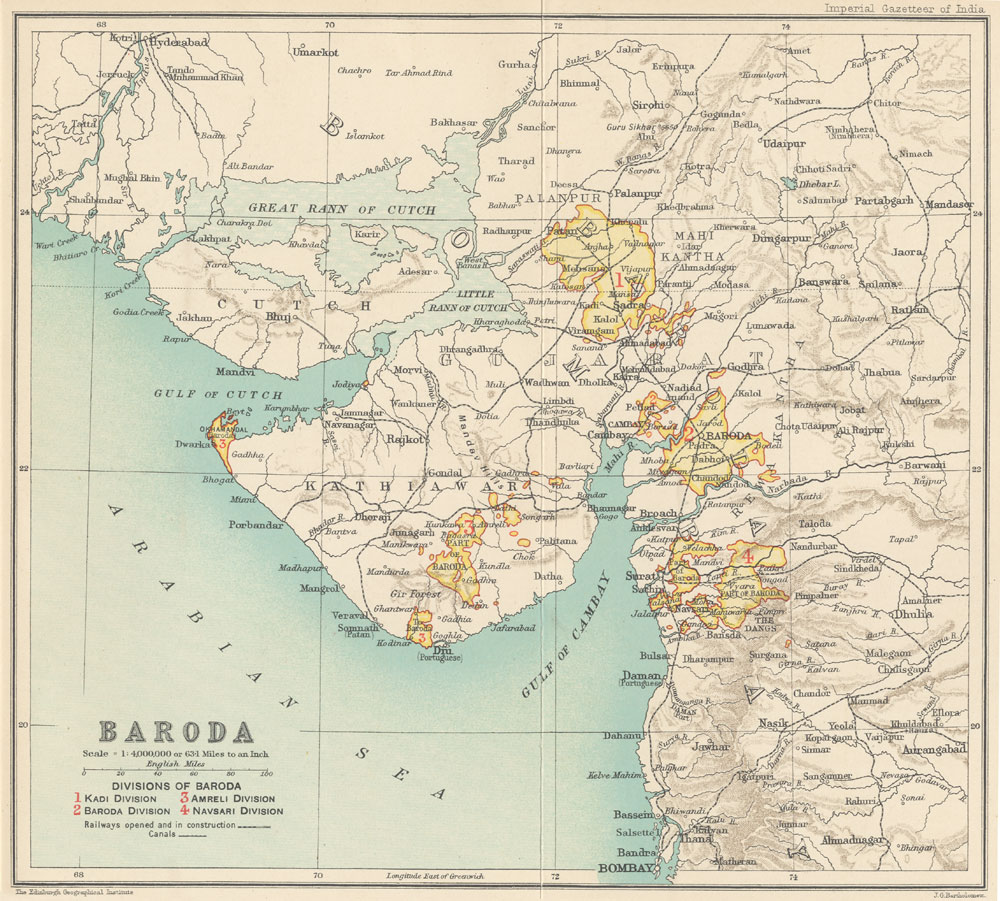
Baroda State in 1909

Begum Shareefa Hamid Ali was born on 12 December 1883, to a progressive Muslim family in Baroda (now known as Vadodara), Gujarat, the administrative center of colonial British India. She was the daughter of Ameena Tyabji and Abbas J. Tyabji, the nephew of the Indian activist and politician Badruddin Tyabji. Her father, Abbas J. Tyabji, was the Chief Justice of Baroda State and a follower of Mahatma Gandhi. Her mother Ameena was one of the first prominent Muslim women to disavow purdah. Ali followed her mother's example and supported the movement against this restrictive law, as she saw it as a symbol of social division and gendered oppression. In fact, her parents had supported her and her sisters’ education by sending them to school despite purdah restrictions. Begum Hamid Ali learned to speak six languages, Urdu, Gujarati, Persian, Marathi, English and French. She also devoted her time to painting, drawing and music. At the age of twenty-five she married Hamid Ali, her cousin and an Indian Civil Service Officer. After their marriage, they moved to the province of the Bombay Presidency in India. She remained involved in social work and continued to cultivate her interests.

== Political career ==
In 1907, Ali attended a session of the Indian National Congress, which developed her interest towards the Swadeshi Movement and the support and uplifting in society of the Harijans. She also worked in villages to start nursing centres and classes for women, while providing her help and guidance. One of her most renowned achievements was organizing a campaign to encourage the Sarda Act, also known as the Child Marriage Restraint Act, which was passed on 28 September 1929. She addressed Muslim women in Sindh and used the example of her own experience to gain their support. As the mother of seven daughters, Ali claimed that two of them had been ‘’victim to this custom.’’ Because of this, she had decided to postpone their marriages until they were educated and mature as she believed that legal age for marriage should be eighteen.

In 1935 she represented the All India Women's Conference at the Istanbul Congress of the International Alliance of Women, and in 1937 at Lohacovice, Czechoslovakia, she took part in the Congress of the Women's International League for Peace and Freedom.

Ali was appointed to a women's sub-committee of the National Planning Committee in 1939. The role of the sub-committee was to review the social, economic and legal status of women, as well as to recommend measures to make equality of opportunity and status possible. Initially appointed with two other Muslim women, they later resigned as they felt they were not being listened to. As such, Ali was the only Muslim woman participating in the committee and encouraged consultation with authorities on Muslim Law in order to obtain a different perspective. To her disappointment, she found that other members did not understand or pay attention to her arguments. As she mentions, she found that the draft report:

Showed such ignorance of Islam – its laws and practice (in spite of my having sent a very clear and detailed report in my evidence of these matters) that I had to protest very strongly against its inclusion.

— Shareefa Hamid Ali, Forbes, Geraldine, Women in Modern India, Cambridge University Press, vol. IV,2 (State university of New York, 1996), 199-200.

Following Jawaharlal Nehru's intervention and grant of an extension to the sub-committee, she signed the final report.

The Indian Government appointed her as the Indian representative to the United Nations Commission on the Status of Women. She also became a member of the National Planning Commission of the Indian National Congress and the Hindustan Textbook Committee.

== The Child Marriage Restraint Act (Sarda Act) ==
Ali lobbied for Har Bilas Sarda's Child Marriage Restraint Act, also known as the Sarda Act (or Sharda Act), which aimed to reduce the number of women getting married under the age of fifteen. Ali organized a campaign in Sindh where she gathered Muslim women together to back the bill by pressuring lawmakers. She argued that women should delay marriage until they were more mature and educated, and suggested the age of eighteen. As a mother of seven daughters, two of whom had risked getting married before they were adults, she had a personal connection to the campaign. The Sarda campaign had support from women unified by liberal feminism, including Hindus, Muslims, Sikhs, and the lower castes. These women banded together to eliminate doubt about what women wanted, and embarrassed the colonial state. The movement resulted in the passing of the Sarda Act in 1929, making it the first legislation for minimum age of marriage in India. It was set at 14 years old for girls and 18 for boys.

== All India Women's Conference ==
Ali was a prominent leader in the All India Women's Conference (AIWC). She was, in order, the Honorary Treasurer, chairwoman, vice-president, and President of AIWC, and started several of its branches across India. Ali was also named Chairwoman of the Governing Body of the All India Women's Education Association. She became a part of the AIWC as the previous president, Sarojini Naidu, a political activist who fought for Indian independence and a poet, was in prison. As a result, there were rotating presidents for each session, and Ali became one of two Indian women who took up this role.

As part of the AIWC, she testified in front of the Joint Select Committee on Indian Constitutional Reform in London in 1933. In opposition of the establishment of a separate electorate that would bring about unbalanced power to religious-based parties, she argued that this would hinder the reform of inheritance laws. Begum Shah Nawaz, a politician and Muslim League activist, questioned her attempt, arguing that Muslim women would not agree with Ali's proposal if Muslim men did not accept her electoral proposal.

The AIWC advocated for a common civil code that was consistent with the organization's commitments and that also took both non-communal and communal approaches. Ali and other Muslim women within the AIWC feared domination by Hindus, but there were diverging opinions even among the Muslim women. Ali, as a Congress Muslim, justified her position by alluding to the Iraqi and Turkish secular models, as well as the Indian penal code. Her position was challenged by Begum Sultan Mir Amiruddin, who claimed that:

Muslim women intend merely to secure restitution of privileges granted to them by their prophet.

— Begum Sultan Mir Amiruddin,

In the end, the AIWC hoped for a secular civil code and did not explicitly call for a common civil code. The marriage and inheritance rights proposal of the AIWC did pertain more to Hindu concerns than those of Muslim women.

== UN Commission on the Status of Women ==
Emblem of the United Nations

In February 1947, Ali represented India as one of 15 women to attend the first United Nations Commission on the Status of Women. She worked alongside delegates from Australia, the USSR, the People's Republic of China, Costa Rica, Denmark, France, Guatemala, Mexico, Syria, Turkey, the United Kingdom, the United States of America, and Venezuela. At the commission, Ali and the other delegates established the guiding principles of the commission:

To raise the status of women, irrespective of nationality, race, language or religion, to equality with men in all fields of human enterprise, and to eliminate all discrimination against women in the provisions of statutory law, in legal maxims or rules, or in interpretation of customary law.

—

Today, the commission is still guided by these principles, and has influenced the drafting of resolutions related to Ali's work in India in the 1950s and 1960s. This includes the United Nations Universal Declaration of Human Rights and the Convention on Consent to Marriage, Minimum Age for Marriage and Registration of Marriages.

== See also ==
- All India Women's Conference
- United Nations Commission on the Status of Women
- Sarda Act
- United Nations Universal Declaration of Human Rights
- Convention on Consent to Marriage, Minimum Age for Marriage and Registration of Marriages

== Bibliography ==
- Everett, Jana (2001). "'All the Women Were Hindu and All the Muslims Were Men': State, Identity Politics and Gender, 1917-1951". Economic and Political Weekly. 36 (23): 2071–2080. JSTOR 4410720.
- Forbes, Geraldine. Women in Modern India. Cambridge University Press. Vol. IV,2. State University of New York, 1996.
- Luchsinger, Gretchen, ed. (2019). Short history of the Commission on the Status of Women (PDF). UN Women. ISBN 978-1-63214-154-5.
- Jain, Devaki (2005). Women, Development, and the UN: A Sixty-Year Quest for Equality and Justice. Indiana University Press. ISBN 978-0-253-11184-5. Project MUSE book 9204.
- Mukherjee, Sumita (4 May 2017). "The All-Asian Women's Conference 1931: Indian women and their leadership of a pan-Asian feminist organisation". Women's History Review. 26 (3): 363–381. doi:10.1080/09612025.2016.1163924. hdl:1983/a56bd83d-e982-46ba-84b3-82225ecba694. S2CID 147853155.
- Mukherjee, Sumita (November 2006). "Using the Legislative Assembly for Social Reform: the Sarda Act of 1929". South Asia Research. 26 (3): 219–233. doi:10.1177/0262728006071514. S2CID 144032025.
- Shamsie, Muneeza (11 July 2015). And the World Changed: Contemporary Stories by Pakistani Women. Feminist Press at The City University of New York. pp. 5–. ISBN 978-1-55861-931-9.
- Sinha, Mrinalini (2000). "Refashioning Mother India: Feminism and Nationalism in Late-Colonial India". Feminist Studies. 26 (3): 623–644. doi:10.2307/3178643. hdl:2027/spo.0499697.0026.308. JSTOR 3178643.
- Srivastava, Gouri. The Legend Makers: Some Eminent Women of India. New Delhi: Concept Pub. Co., 2003.
- Wayne, Tiffany K. Feminist Writings from Ancient Times to the Modern World: A Global Sourcebook and History. Greenwood, 2011.
- Woodsmall, Ruth Frances. Women in the Changing Islamic System. BIMLA Publishing House, 1936.
- Zabel, Darcy A . "Shareefah Hamid Ali." In Feminist Writings from Ancient Times to the Modern World : A Global Sourcebook and History, 514–16. ABC-CLIO, LLC, 2011.
