= Kamila Tyabji =

Indian lawyer

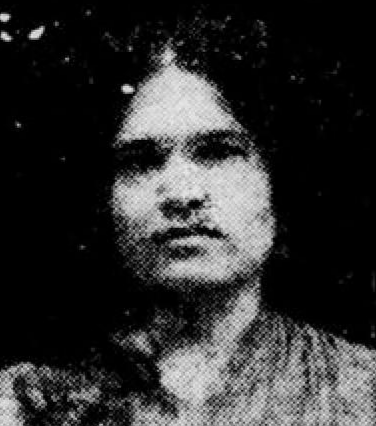
- Kamila Tyabji as a young woman, from a 1937 newspaper.
- Born: Kamila Faiz Badruddin Tyabji; 14 February 1918; Mumbai
- Died: 17 May 2004 (aged 86); Mumbai
- Occupation(s): Lawyer, philanthropist
- Family: Tyabji family

Kamila Tyabji (14 February 1918 – 17 May 2004) was an Indian philanthropist and lawyer. As a lawyer, Tyabji was renowned for being London's only woman barrister and the first to argue a case before the Privy Council.

== Early life and education ==
Kamila Faiz Badruddin Tyabji was born in Bombay, a member of the prominent Muslim Tyabji family of that city. Her father was Faiz Badruddin Tyabji, a judge, and her mother Salima was a member of the Bombay Legislative Assembly. Her grandfather was Badruddin Tyabji (1844-1906), third president of the Indian National Congress. Her brother was Badruddin Tyabji, Laila Tyabji is her niece, and Zafar Futehally was her first cousin.

Tyabji attended St. Xavier's College in Bombay, and St Hugh's College, Oxford; at the latter school, she was a classmate of Indira Gandhi's. She was one of the earliest Muslim women to study at Oxford, arriving in 1937, only two years younger than Velia Abdel-Huda, who is credited as first.

== Career ==
Tyabji wore "brilliant silken saris" while she practiced insurance law in London for 25 years, and hosted a BBC television program, Asian Club, with Shakuntala Shrinagesh, between 1953 and 1956. In 1960 she was founder and first chair of the Women's Indian Association of the United Kingdom.

After returning to India in the mid-1960s, Tyabji founded a charity, the Women's India Trust (WIT) in 1968, to improve women's economic independence by supporting home-based work including sewing, embroidery, and cookery. She began the Kamila Trust in the UK, to support the work of the WIT and open a London shop, Kashi, to sell WIT goods.

Tyabji wrote Limited Interests in Muhammadan Law (1949), "Education and Life: Some Rethinking for Commonwealth Women" (1966), and "Polygamy, Unilateral Divorce, and Mahr in Muslim Law as Interpreted in India". She was India's representative on the United Nations Commission on the Status of Women.

== Personal life and legacy ==
Tyabji died in Mumbai in 2004, aged 86 years. WIT continues working for women's economic independence, and runs a nursing home and teacher training school in addition to its original activities. The Kamila Tyabji WIT Centre in Panvel was named in her honour. In 2014, she was posthumously awarded the KarmaVeer Puraskaar, for her lifetime achievements.
