= Tyabji family =

Indian family

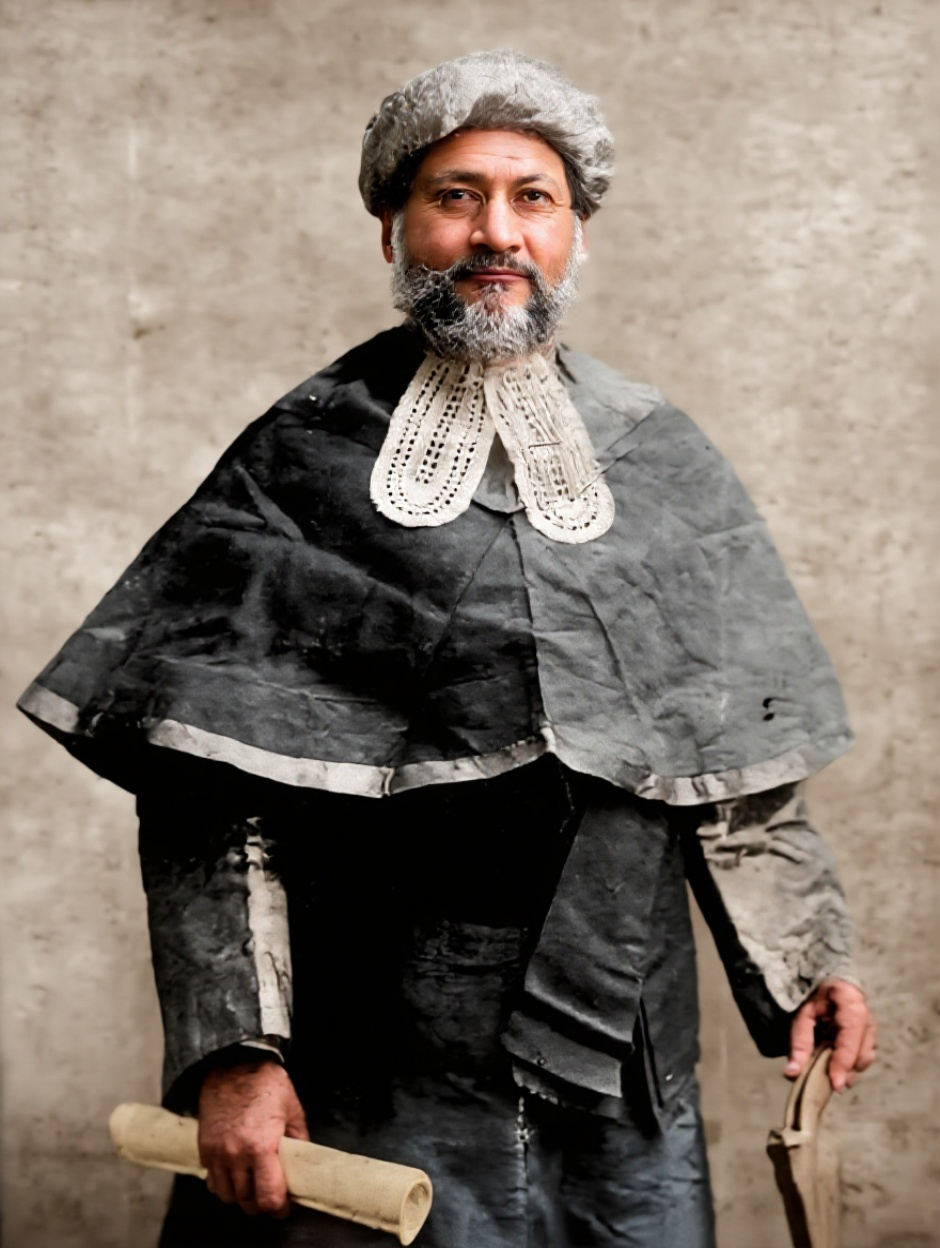
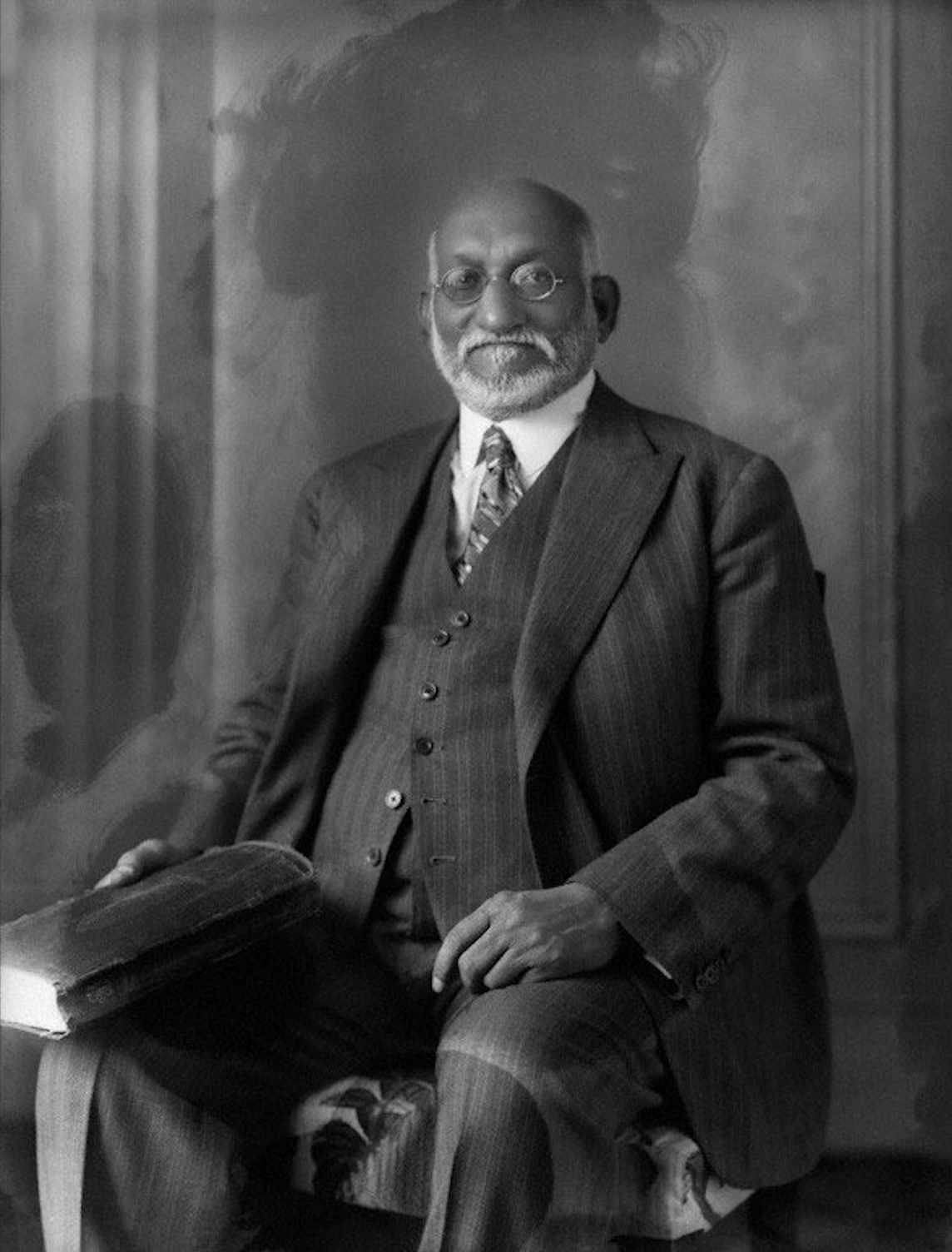
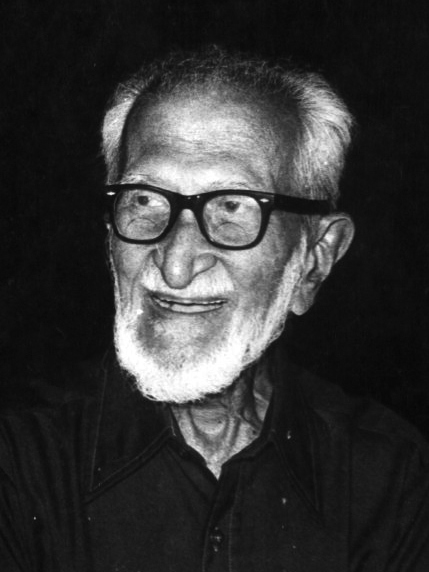
- Badruddin Tyabji Akbar Hydari Salim Ali
- Current region: Mumbai, India
- Etymology: Tyab from Tayyab (Arabic): 'good-natured' ji from -ji: 'gender-neutral honorific'
- Origin: Cambay
- Founded: 1825 as Tyabjee&Co.
- Founder: Tyab Ali (1803–1863)
- Traditions: Sulaimani Bohra Islam

The Tyabji family, also known through its various branches as the Tyabji-Hydari, Tyabji-Fyzee, and Tyabji-Futehally, is an Indian Muslim family distinguished for its contributions to public service, intellectual life, and the Indian independence movement. Members of the family have held influential positions in politics, diplomacy, law, academia, the arts, and the armed forces, and several were among the first Indians to hold senior positions in the civil service, judiciary, and military. Several individuals served as leading figures within the Indian National Congress. Members have often been closely associated with colonial and post-independence governance structures.

Members of the family include individuals who have served as heads of state, state governors, ambassadors, chiefs of the Indian Air Force and Indian Navy, as well as former Olympians. Through marriage and descent, the family has been connected to various princely and aristocratic families, including the royal houses of Hyderabad, Bengal, Wanaparthy, and Janjira.

== Origin ==
The Tyabji family is descended from Mullah Tyab Ali Bhoymeeah and his younger brother Feyzhyder, members of the Sulaimani Bohra community, and a scion of an old Cambay emigrant Arab family. Bhoymeeah began his career as a petty trader. In the second half of the 18th century, Bhoymeeah was among the early immigrants who moved to Bombay. Bhoymeeah initially established commercial relationships with British residents, accumulated funds, and invested them by working as a dallal (broker). By 1825, the Tyabjis founded their own business, Tyabji&Co., an import-export company. By the end of Bhoymeeah's life, the family was listed among the shetia, the "Merchant princes" of Bombay. The Tyabjis adopted the -ji suffix as a result of their high social status.

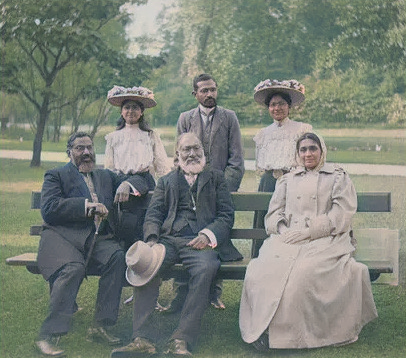
Badruddin Tyabji and family in Regent's Park in 1906

The emergence of the family can largely be attributed to Badruddin Tyabji. Following Partition, the majority of the family remained in India, with some emigrating to Pakistan. Those who stayed in India, especially those traditionally linked with government service and The Indian National Congress, often benefited from the opportunities created by the emigration of other Muslims and Jawaharlal Nehru's policy of ensuring Muslim representation in public sectors. As a result, the Tyabjis showed high representation in all public sectors, including the Indian armed forces.

The Tyabjis were primarily educated at the University of Oxford, the University of Cambridge, and St. Xavier's College, Mumbai. With a minority having read at Aligarh Muslim University. Children were often sent to private day and boarding schools in the United Kingdom among which a few notable examples include Rugby School, Highgate School, and The Royal School, Haslemere.

Currently, the lingua franca of the Tyabjis is English.

== Governance and diplomacy ==
Major-general Sahibzada Iskander Ali Mirza, CIE, OSS, OBE, Order of Pahlavi, India General Service Medal (1909) was the first president of Pakistan. He was educated at the University of Bombay and was the first Indian to attend the Royal Military College in Sandhurst. Mirza was appointed as the first Defence Secretary and later as Governor of East Bengal.

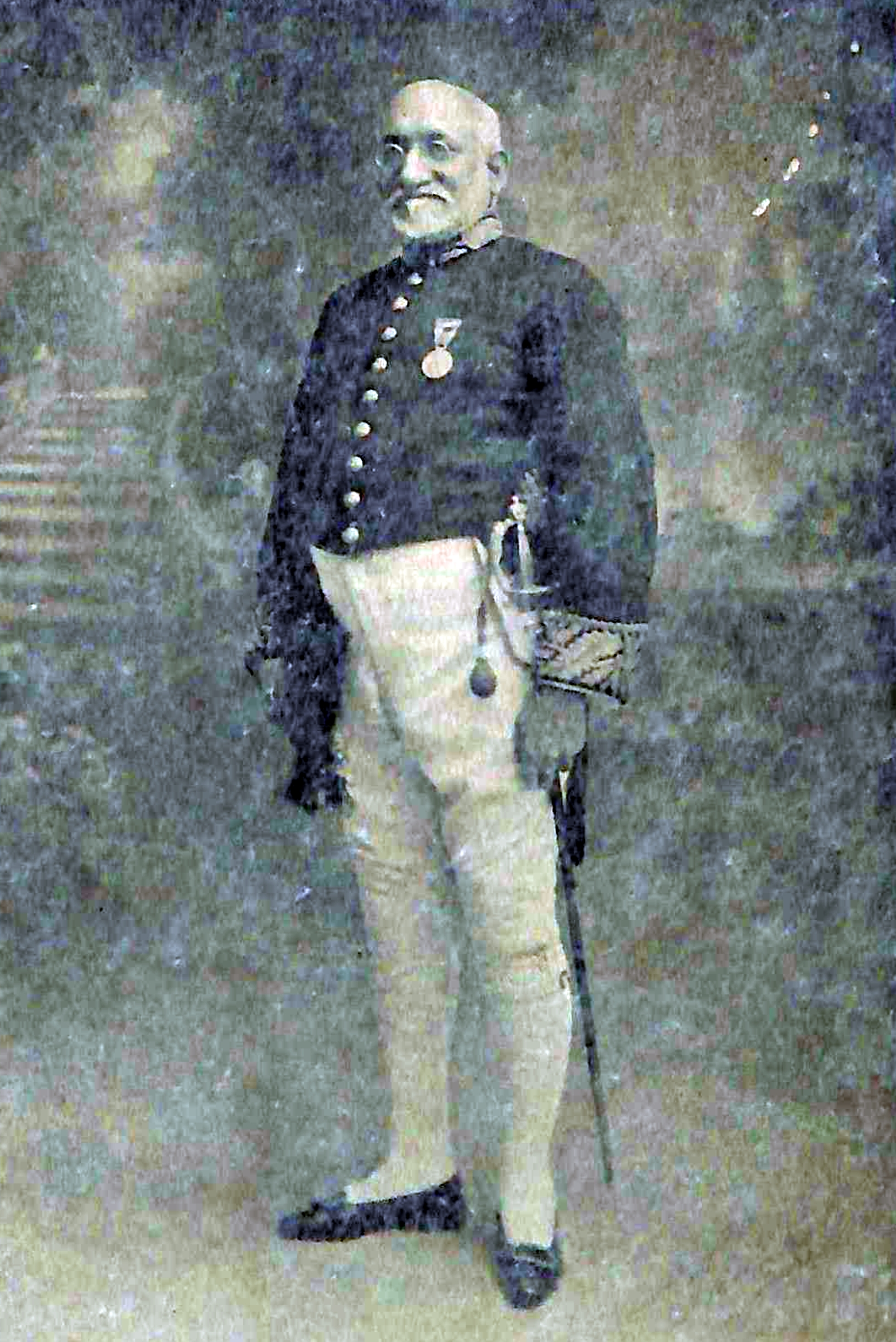
Sir Muhammad Akbar Nazar Ali Hydari, the Prime Minister of Hyderabad State

Sir Muhammad Akbar Nazar Ali Hydari, PC, was the Prime Minister of Hyderabad State. He represented Hyderabad at the First round Table Conference. He was later appointed as a member of the Privy Council of the United Kingdom. Hydari was the first Muslim to pass the examination of the Gazetted Officer for the Finance Department.

Hydari was pivotal in the foundation of the Doon School, working to obtain the former estate of the Forest Research Institute, in Dehradun, from the government on favourable terms for the site of the school. Of the four original houses Hyderabad House was named after Akbar Hydari, who secured a contribution from the Nizam of Hyderabad's government.

Badruddin Faiz Tyabji, ICS, served as the Indian ambassador to Indonesia, Iran, Germany, and Japan. Tyabji graduated from Balliol College, Oxford before joining the ICS. In 1948, he was charged with starting the Embassy of India in Brussels, Belgium. He served as the Deputy Secretariat of the Constituent Assembly of India and as Vice-Chancellor of the Aligarh Muslim University.

Asaf Ali Asghar Fyzee, Padma Bhushan, served as India's second ambassador to Egypt and Vice-Chancellor of the University of Jammu and Kashmir. Fyzee was a barrister-at-law and an advocate in the Bombay High Court. Fyzee was appointed as a member of the Union Public Service Commission, New Delhi. Fyzee was a member of the Indian delegation to the Third General Conference of UNESCO, held in Beirut in November 1948.

Agha Hilaly, ICS, Hilal-i-Quiad-I-Azam, Grand Cross of Order of Northern Star, Grand Cross of Order of Gurkha, was one of the first members to join the Civil Service of Pakistan and played a vital role in Pakistan's foreign policy in the years following Partition. Hilaly graduated from the University of Cambridge. Hilaly served as the Pakistani ambassador to the United States of America, Sweden, Russia, the Czech Republic, and India. Hilaly represented Pakistan in the United Nations and facilitated the secret visit of US Secretary of State Henry Kissinger to China.

Shareefa Hamid Ali was the President of All India Women's Conference and a founding member of the United Nations Commission on the Status of Women in 1947. Ali could speak Urdu, Gujarati, Persian, Marathi, English and French. She represented India at the Istanbul Congress of the International Alliance of Women and partook in the Congress of the Women's International League for Peace and Freedom in Czechoslovakia. Ali was also a member of the National Planning Commission of the Indian National Congress and the Hindustan Textbook Committee. Ali's work at the United Nations influenced the United Nations Universal Declaration of Human Rights, the Convention on Consent to Marriage, the Minimum Age for Marriage, and the Registration of Marriages.

Dr Alma Camruddin Latifi, CIE, OBE, Kaisar-i-Hind Medal (1937), was a member of Punjab's Legislative Council and Secretary of the Consulting Committee at the Third round Table Conference in London in 1932. Latifi was of Gray's Inn, Barrister-at-Law and Senior Whewell Professor of International Law, Cambridge, 1902. Latifi graduated with a degree from St. John's College, Cambridge, a donation of a Bodhisattva head belonging to Latifi can be found in the British Museum in London. Latifi published several papers that can be found in the American Political Science Review and the Political Science Quarterly. Latifi was also a member of the exclusive Athenæum Club in London, a club that boasts 51 Nobel Laureates as members.

Saif Faiz Badruddin Tyabji was a Congress Member of Parliament in 1957 from Jalna Lok Sabha Constituency in Maharashtra. Tyabji received his degrees from the University of Bombay and the University of Cambridge. Tyabji opposed the purdah system and urged educated Muslims to take part in Indian politics and policymaking.

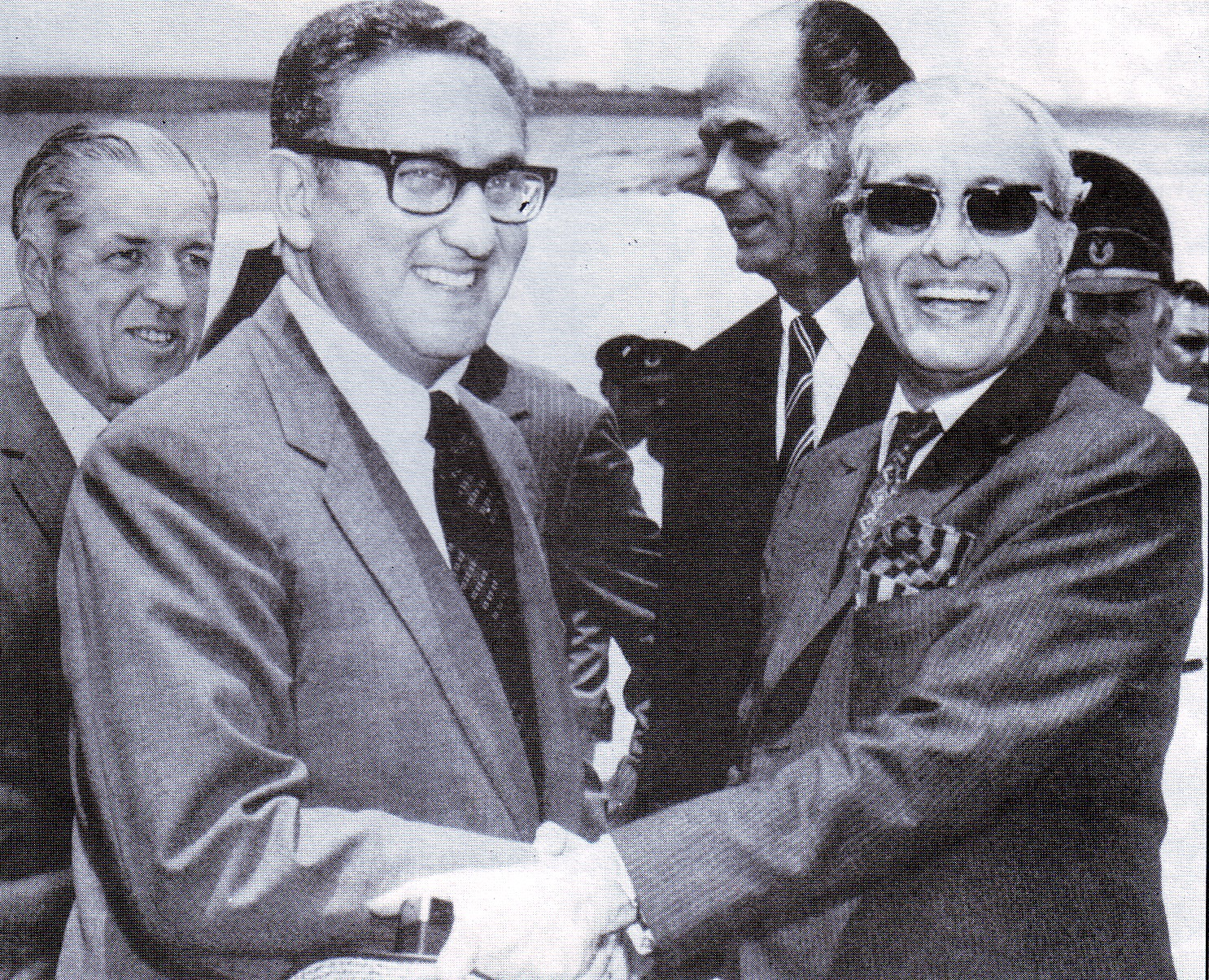
Agha Hilaly with US Secretary of State Henry Alfred Kissinger, KCMG

Danial Alma Latifi was the first Indian to practice as barrister in the Bombay High Court and the first Muslim to rise to position of Senior Advocate in the Indian Supreme Court. Latifi attended Government College Lahore and Rugby School and graduated with a BA and MA from St John's College, Oxford. Latifi was called to the Bar at Gray's Inn in 1939. Among Latifi's well-known cases was the Shah Bano Case, Mohd. Ahmad Khan v. Shah Bano Begum which became household knowledge in India. Latifi presented St John's College with a set of silver pattens in 1958, which remain in the College's silver store.

Nawab Ali Yavar Jung Bahadur, IFS, Padma Vibhushan, Padma Bhushan, was an Indian diplomat and politician who served as the governor of Maharashtra. Bahadur studied at Queen's College, Oxford where he received a degree in History. Bahadur served as the Indian ambassador to Argentina, Egypt, Yugoslavia, Greece, and the United States of America. His close relationships with Juan Perón, Gamal Abdel Nasser, Josip Broz Tito, Charles de Gaulle, and Lyndon B. Johnson have been noted to have substantially contributed to foreign understanding of independent India's foreign policy. The Western Express Highway in Mumbai and The National Institute for the Hearing Handicapped located there are named after him.

Mohammad Habib was an eminent Indian historian and politician, playing a role in the Indian independence movement. Habib was also a close associate of Mahatma Gandhi and Jawaharlal Nehru. Habib received his degrees from Aligarh Muslim University and New College, Oxford. In 1926 Habib won the Uttar Pradesh Legislative Council election representing the Swaraj Party. He unsuccessfully contested the position of Vice-President of India in 1967, losing to Varahagiri Venkata Giri.

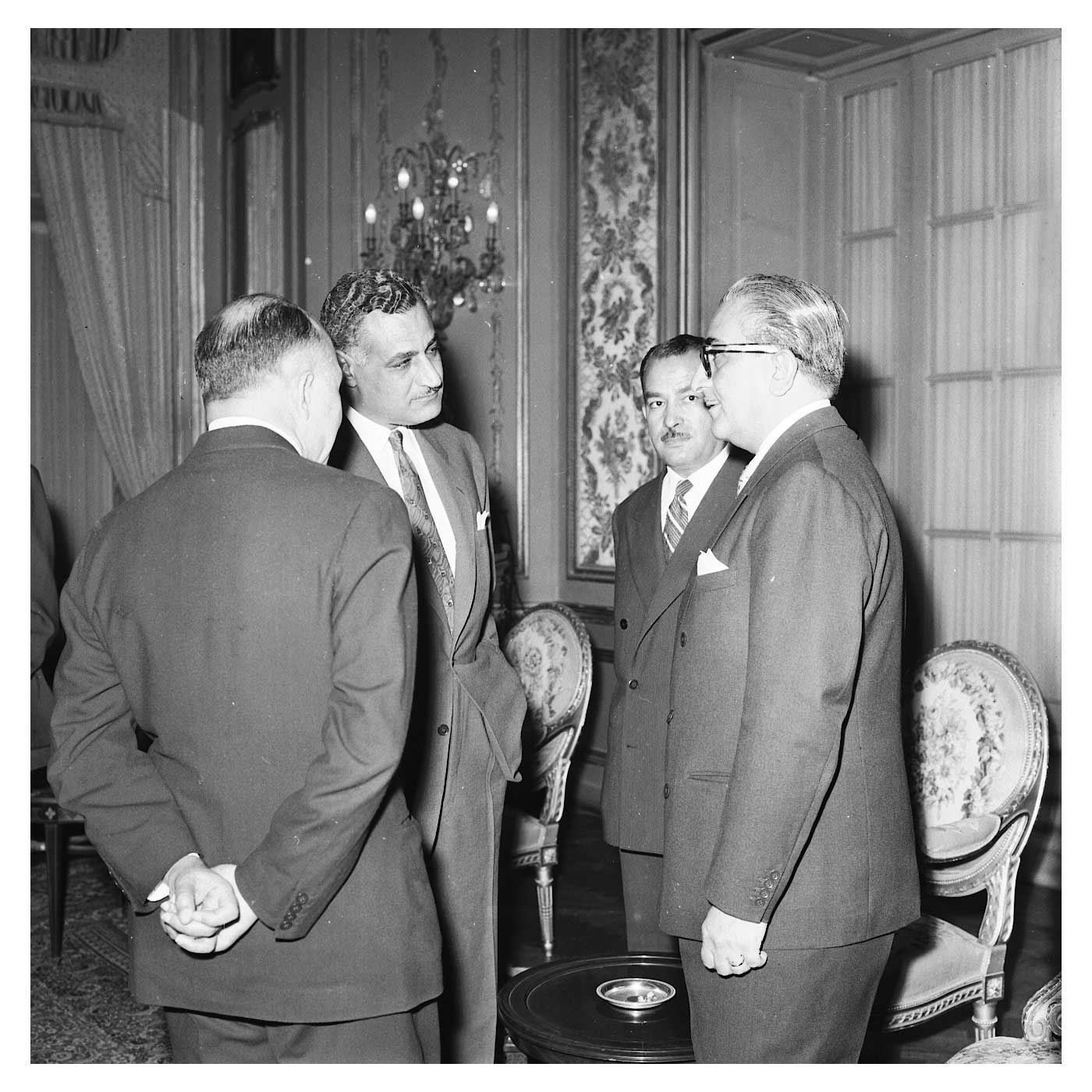
Nawab Ali Yavar Jung Bahadur (centre right) with the second president of Egypt His Excellency Gamal Abdel Nasser (centre left)

Sir Muhammad Saleh Akbar Hydari, KCIE, CSI, ICS was the last governor of Assam appointed by King George VI. Hydari graduated from the University of Oxford and served as the undersecretary in the Department of Education, Health and Lands of the imperial government of India. Hydari served as the secretary to the Imperial Council of Agricultural Research. Hydari represented Hyderabad State at the Round Table Conferences in London.

Judeline Kim Mary Tyabji is a former British Columbia politician, who was the youngest elected Member of the Legislative Assembly of British Columbia.

Mohsin Badruddin Tyabji, ICS, completed his degrees from St. Xavier's College and Balliol College, University of Oxford. Tyabji was later Chief Justice of the Baroda High Court. Tyabji was the first Muslim to join the Indian Civil Service in 1885.

Salima Faiz Tyabji was a member of the Bombay Legislative Assembly in 1937. Tyabji completed her degrees from the University of Bombay and the University of Oxford. Tyabji worked with the Oxford University Press in Delhi, specialising in history.

Zafar Hilaly served as the Pakistani ambassador to Yemen, Nigeria, and Italy. Hilaly was educated at Highgate School and later joined the Pakistan Foreign Service.

Hatim Badruddin Tyabji was educated at Balliol College, Oxford and later became the Chief Judge of Sindh High Court in 1947.

Husain Badruddin Tyabji read law at Downing College, Cambridge, and was called to the bar. In 1952 Tyabji wrote a detailed and accurate biography of his father titled Badruddin Tyabji: A Biography that has served as a foundational text on the life of Badruddin Tyabji.

Camruddin Tyabji was one of the first Indians to study in the United Kingdom and in 1858 became the first Indian to be admitted a solicitor in England.

== Indian independence movement ==
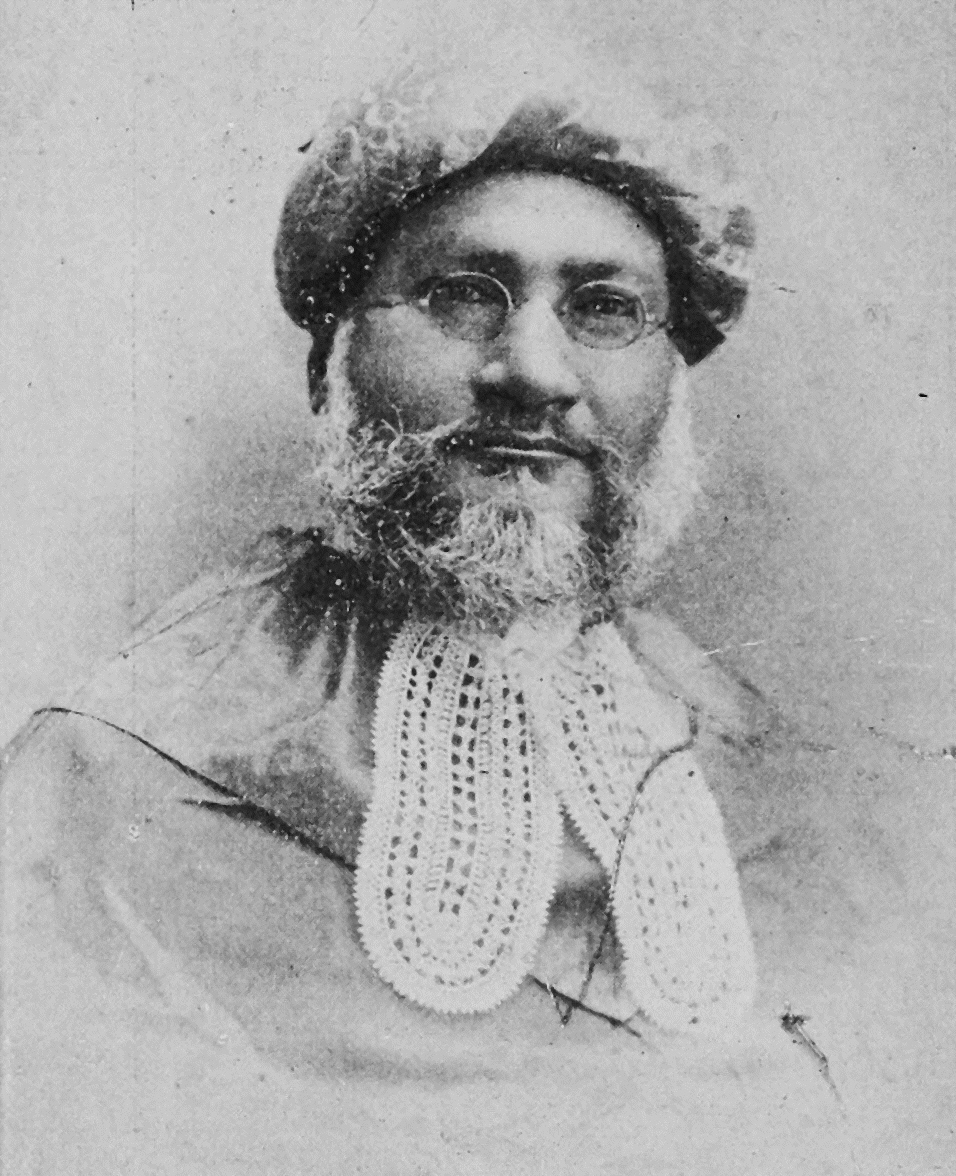
Badruddin Tyabji, President of the Indian National Congress

Badruddin Tyabji was a founding member and the first Muslim president of the Indian National Congress. Tyabji graduated from University College London a member institution of the University of London and was called to the bar at Middle Temple. Tyabji was the first Indian to hold the post of Chief Justice of the Bombay High Court. Tyabji was nominated to the Bombay Municipal Corporation, he was a member of the University of Bombay and appointed to the Bombay Legislative Council. Tyabji founded Anjuman-i-Islam College in Bombay.

"Be moderate in your demands, be just in your criticism, be accurate in your facts, be logical in your conclusions, and you may rest assured that any propositions you may make to our rulers will be received with that benign consideration which is the characteristic of a strong and enlightened Government."

— Badruddin Tyabji, Presidential Address – Indian National Congress Session, 1887, Madras.

Surayya Tyabji is recognised to have assisted in designing the flag of India. In the weeks leading up to Indian independence Jawaharlal Nehru instructed Tyabji's husband Badruddin Tyabji to present a final design. This involved forming a committee with Dr Rajendra Prasad and contacting several of India's top art schools. English historian Trevor Royle stated in The Last Days of The Raj: "Originally the tricolour was to have contained the spinning wheel symbol (charkha) used by Gandhi but this was a party symbol, which Tyabji thought might strike the wrong note. After much persuasion Gandhi agreed to the wheel because the Emperor Ashoka was venerated by Hindu and Muslim alike. The flag which flew on Nehru’s car that night had been specifically made by Tyabji’s wife".

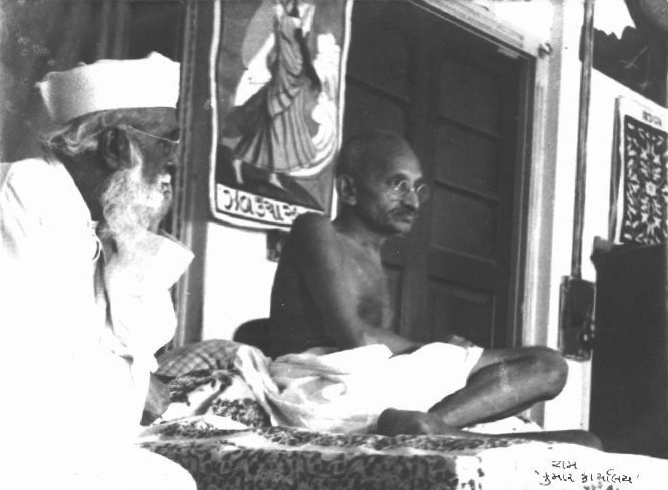
Abbas Tyabji with Mahatma Gandhi

Abbas Tyabji the Grand Old Man of Gujarat was a freedom fighter and close associate of Mahatma Gandhi, Tyabji was a prominent figure in the Indian independence movement. Tyabji served as the Chief Justice of Baroda State. In 1919, Tyabji was appointed chairman of the independent fact-finding committee by the Indian National Congress for the Jallianwala Bagh massacre. This led to him becoming a loyal supporter of Gandhi and the independence movement. In 1930, the Indian National Congress declared Purna Swaraj, following Gandhi's arrest. Tyabji launched the Dharasana Satyagraha, marching alongside Kasturba Gandhi. Tyabji was later appointed by Gandhi to become the leader of the Salt Satyagraha for which he was later arrested by the British Indian Government.

Raihana Tyabji was a staunch follower of Mahatma Gandhi and renounced her familial inheritance to devote her life to his cause. Tyabji played a major role in the Non-cooperation movement, urging the masses to adopt ‘swadeshi’ as the principle of their lives. Tyabji was the president of the Youth League Congress and was arrested for participating in the Indian independence movement. Even though Tyabji was a Muslim she regularly sang Hindu devotional songs and was the first Muslim to sing Vande Mataram at an Indian National Congress session. Tyabji worked with Gandhi to eradicate untouchability and prohibit child marriage.

== Royalty ==
Nawab Sidi Sir Ahmad Khan Sidi Ibrahim Khan III, GCIE, was the king of the princely state of Janjira. Khan was a descendent of a North African seafaring Islamic tribe known as the Siddis. They were referred to as the best sea fighters in the Muslim world.

Princess Nazli Rafiya Begum of Janjira was married to Nawab Sidi Sir Ahmad Khan Sidi Ibrahim Khan III, GCIE. In 1908, she undertook a formal tour of Britain, Europe, and the Ottoman Empire in accompaniment of her princely husband. Alongside the Maharaja of Cooch Behar and Maharaja of Nepal, Begum and her husband were received by King Edward VII and Queen Alexandra in London.

Nawab Sayyid Mansur Ali Khan was the Nawab of Bengal. Khan succeeded his father at the age of eight years to become the Nawab of Bengal with Kishvar Khan as his Wazir and Khwaja Fazal Mohammed as the chief Qazi. Khan founded the Nizamat School and College and rebuilt the present building of Nizamat Imambara. Khan is the great grandfather of Major-general Sahibzada Iskander Ali Mirza CIE, OSS, OBE, Order of Pahlavi, India General Service Medal (1909).

Nahid Iskander Mirza, was a British-Iranian noblewoman who became the first First Lady of Pakistan from 1956 to 1958. Nahid was the daughter of Amirteymour Kalali, and the granddaughter of Prince Mir 'Ali Mardan Shah, Nuzrat ol-Molk and his wife Ashraf us-Sultana Qajar.

== Academia ==
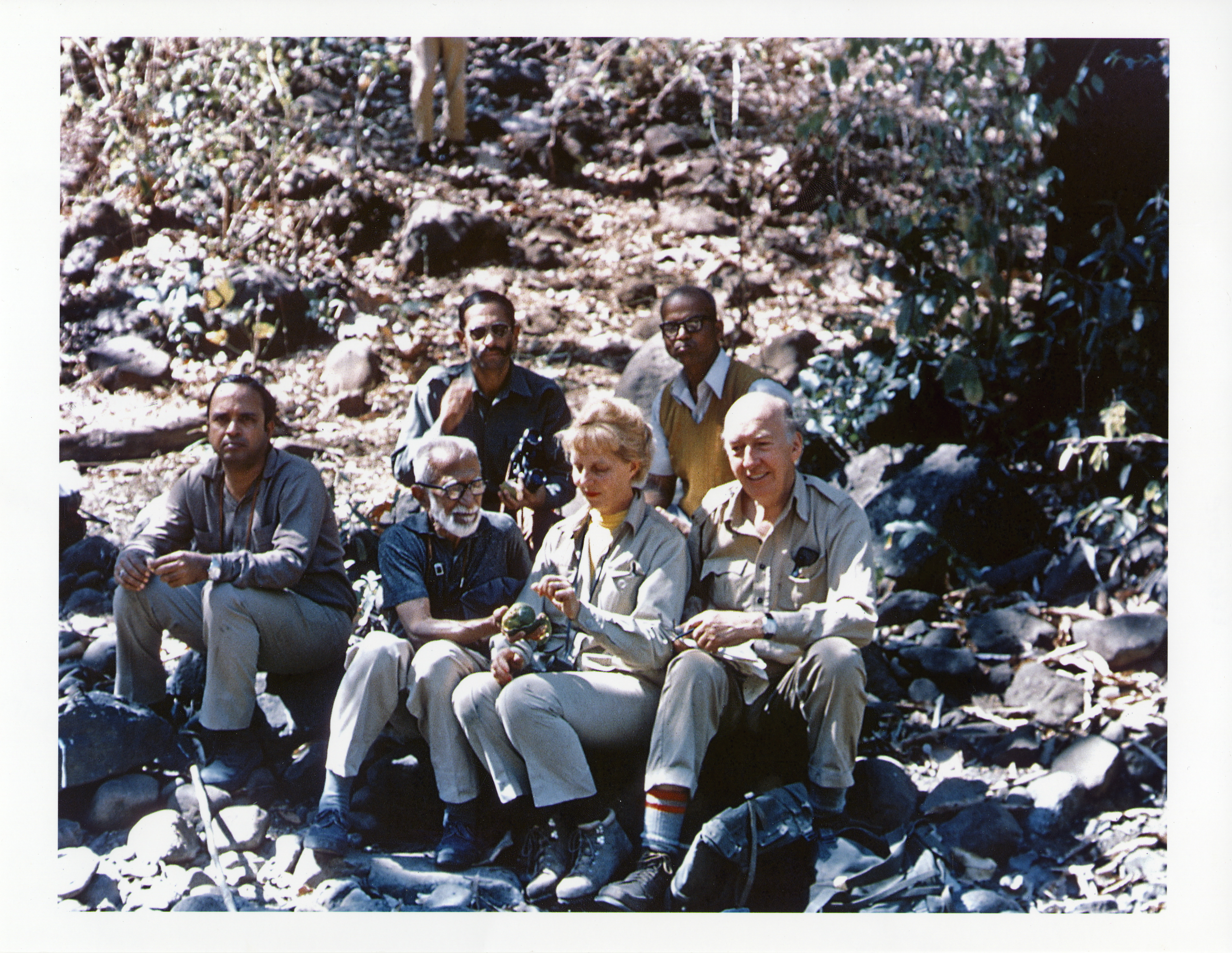
Mary Livingston Ripley (d. 1996), S. Dillon Ripley (1913–2001), and Salim Ali

Sálim Moizuddin Abdul Ali, Padma Vibhushan, Padma Bhushan, Order of the Golden Ark, the Birdman of India was an Indian ornithologist and naturalist. Ali played a major role in establishing the Bharatpur bird sanctuary, a UNESCO World Heritage Site, and preventing the destruction of Silent Valley National Park. Ali along with Sidney Dillon Ripley wrote the 10 volume Handbook of the Birds of India and Pakistan. Several species of birds as well as sanctuaries and institutions have been named after Ali, including the Salim Ali's fruit bat. Ali received his degree from St. Xavier's College, Mumbai and was a prominent contributor to the Bombay Natural History Society. Ali became the first non-British citizen to receive the Gold Medal of the British Ornithologists' Union.

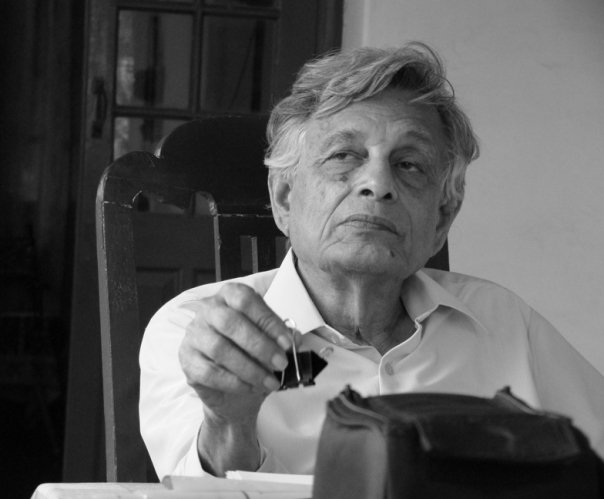
Irfan Habib

Asaf Ali Asghar Fyzee, Padma Bhushan, was also an academic who is considered to be the father of modern Ismaili studies. Fyzee completed his LL. B at Government Law College, Mumbai and went on to study Arabic and Persian at St John's College, Cambridge under eminent orientalist Reynold A. Nicholson. Fyzee is best known for his work Outlines of Muhammadan law and was Principal and Perry Professor of Jurisprudence in Government Law College, Mumbai. Fyzee taught Islamic law at McGill University, University of Cambridge, and University of California, Los Angeles. Fyzee is listed as a notable alumni of St John's College, Cambridge.

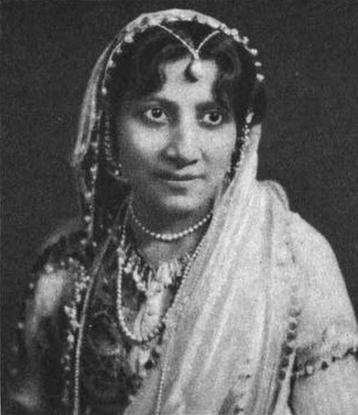
Atiya Begum Fyzee, from a 1921 publication

Irfan Habib, Padma Bhushan, Yash Bharati, is an Indian historian of ancient and medieval India. Habib has authored several books including the Agrarian System of Mughal India, 1556–1707, an Atlas of the Mughal Empire: Political and Economic Maps with Detailed Notes, and an Atlas of Ancient Indian History. Habib graduated from Aligarh Muslim University and New College, Oxford. Habib is a Professor Emeritus at Aligarh Muslim University and delivered the Radhakrishnan Lecture at the University of Oxford in 1991. Habib is an Elected Corresponding Fellow of the British Royal Historical Society. Habib is an Honorary Fellow, New College, Oxford.

Humayun Abdulali was an Indian ornithologist and biologist who contributed greatly to bird collections at the Bombay Natural History Society. Abdulali graduated from St. Xavier's College, Mumbai with a Bachelor of Arts degree. Abdulali published 356 notes in his lifetime and covering birds, snakes, frogs, and other fauna. Abdulali authored 270 scientific papers and wrote 50 book reviews. Abdulali was elected to the Executive Committee of the BNHS in 1942 and served as Joint Secretary of the BNHS. Abdulali played a major role in drafting the Bombay Wild Animals and Wild Birds Protection Act of 1951. Abdulali obtained permission from the Prince of Wales Museum to house the BNHS in its premises. Several Taxa have been named in his honour including Nyctibatrachus humayuni.

Romulus Earl Whitaker, Padma Shri, an American Indian herpetologist and wildlife conservationist, is the founder of the Madras Snake Park, the Andaman and Nicobar Environment Trust, and the Madras Crocodile Bank Trust. Whitaker is a winner of a Whitley Award for outstanding leadership in nature conservation. Whitaker is a member of the advisory committee and the editorial board of the Bombay Natural History Society. Whitaker's 1996 wildlife documentary, The King and I, received an Emmy Award for Outstanding News and Documentary Program Achievement.

Atiya Begum Fyzee was an author and the first woman from South Asia to attend the University of Cambridge. Fyzee was a close associate of Muhammad Ali Jinnah who allotted a palatial residence to her in Pakistan after the Partition. Fyzee published numerous works including a collection of anecdotes from her diary, Atiya's Journeys: A Muslim Woman from Colonial Bombay to Edwardian Britain.

Zafar Rashid Futehally, Padma Shri, Order of the Golden Ark, was an Indian naturalist and conservationist best known for his work as the secretary of the Bombay Natural History Society and for the Newsletter for Birdwatchers. Futehally studied economics at St. Xavier's College, Bombay. Futehally's letters to Prime Minister Indira Gandhi led to the establishment of Karnala Bird Sanctuary in Raigad in the 1960s. Futehally published various works in the media and in scientific journals.

Zehra Fyzee was a writer, playwriter and editor working in India in the early part of the twentieth century.

== Social work ==
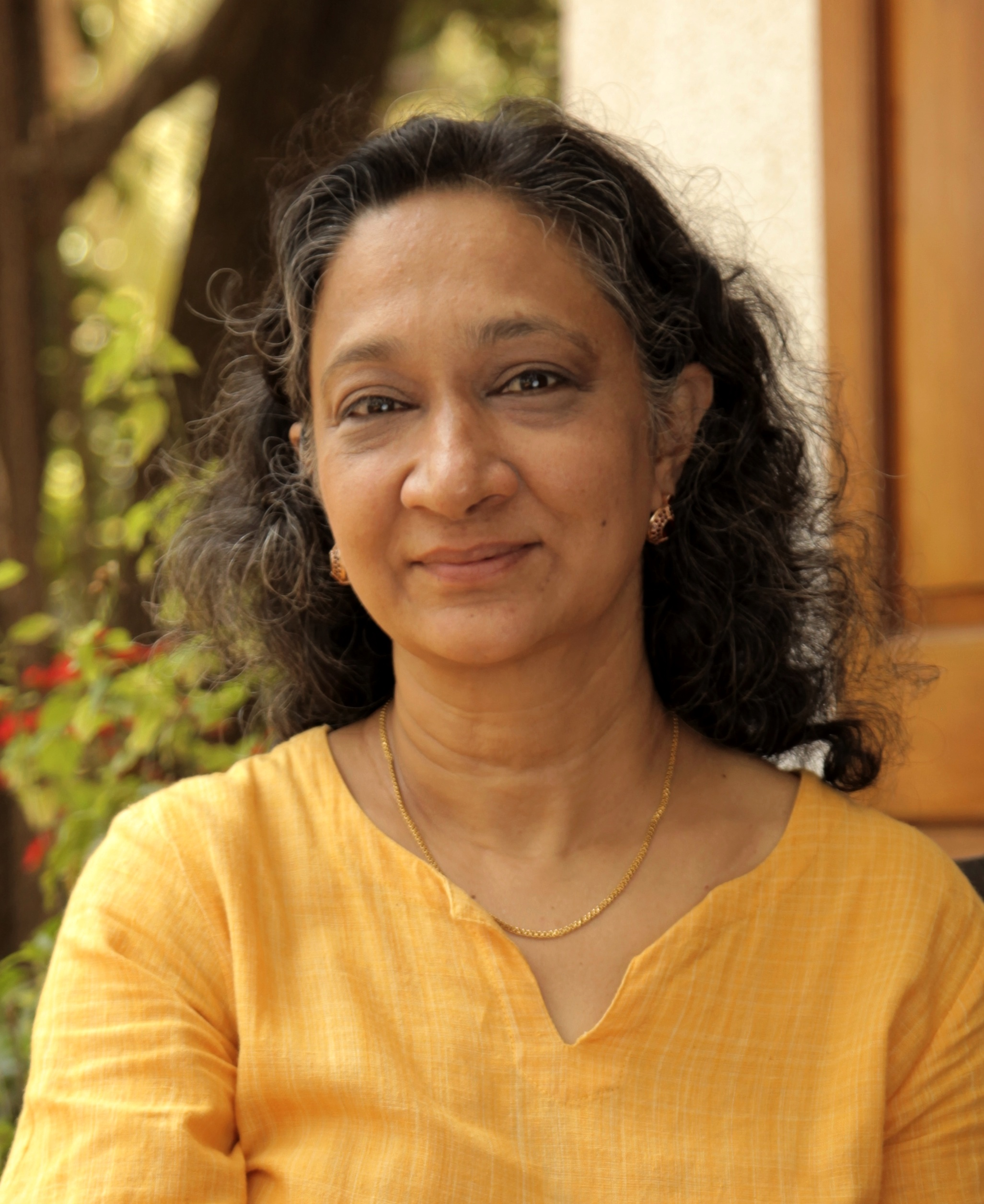
Sumaira Abdulali

Sumaira Abdulali is the founder of the NGO Awaaz Foundation and convenor of the Movement against Intimidation, Threat and Revenge against Activists. Abdulali is currently Governing Council member of the Bombay Natural History Society. Abdulali has been referred to as one of India's foremost environmental activists. Abdulali has spoken at events in universities such as Harvard University, IIT, Delhi University, Bombay University and has been awarded the Mother Teresa Award for Social Justice.

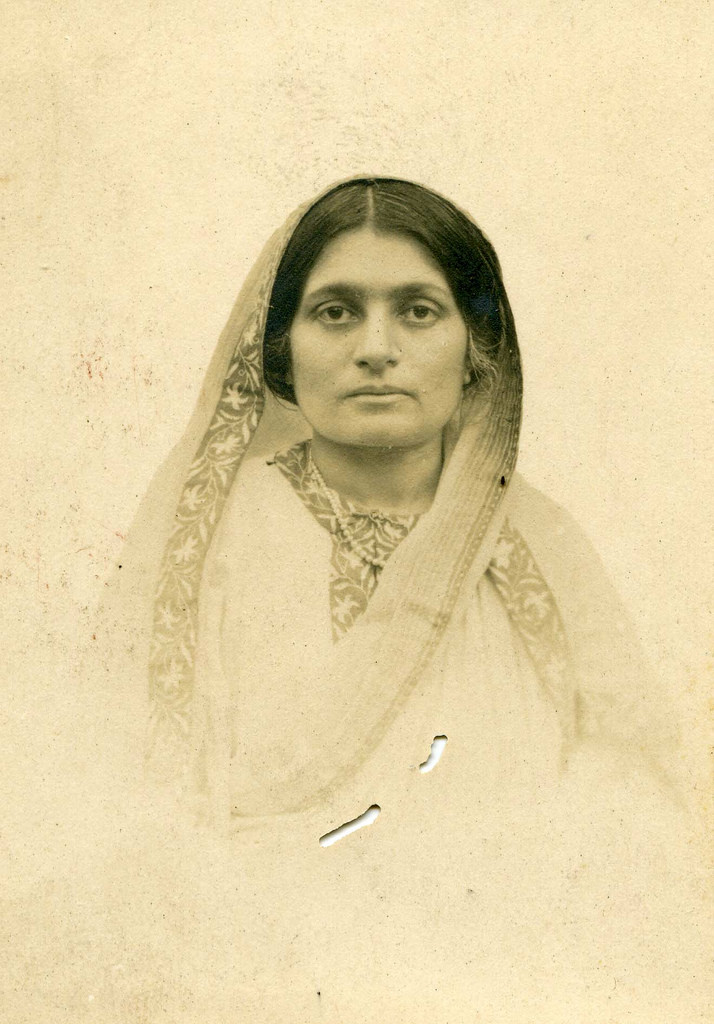
Amina Hydari

Kamila Faiz Badruddin Tyabji, KarmaVeer Puraskaar, was the founder and first chair of the Women's Indian Association of the United Kingdom and founder of Women's India Trust. As a lawyer, Tyabji was renowned for being London's only woman barrister and the first to argue a case before the Privy Council. Tyabji represented India at the United Nations Commission on the Status of Women. Tyabji attended St. Xavier's College, Bombay and St Hugh's College, Oxford, where Indira Gandhi was a classmate of hers. Tyabji is recognized as one of the first Muslim women to graduate from the University of Oxford and has published several works on Muhammadan Law.

Laila Tyabji, Padma Shri, is an Indian social worker, designer, writer, and craft activist. She is one of the founders of Dastkar, a Delhi-based non-governmental organization, working for the revival of traditional crafts in India.

Amina Hydari, Kaisar-i-Hind, was an Indian social worker and the first female recipient of the Kaisar-i-Hind Medal. She founded the Lady Hydari Club in 1929.

Bilkees Latif, Padma Shri, was an Indian social worker and writer from Telangana, known for her work in the slums of India. She was a founding member of INTACH. She is the author of several articles and five books, including Essential Andhra Cookbook, Fragrance of Forgotten Years and The Ladder of His Life : Biography of Air Chief Marshal Idris Latif.

Azim Husain Tyabji was a Muslim scholar and reformer. Tyabji founded the Muslim Education Society (MES) in 1936, MES established the first Muslim High School and MES Girls High School in 1946. MES has since gone on to establish 14 schools across Vadodra.

== Military ==
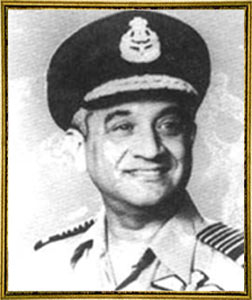
Idris Hasan Latif

Air Chief Marshal Idris Hasan Latif, PVSM, was the 10th chief of the air staff. He also served as the 11th governor of Maharashtra from 1982 to 1985 and then as the Indian ambassador to France. Latif joined the Indian Air Force Volunteer Reserve (IAFVR) during World War II and worked with the Royal Air Force. Latif led the No. 4 Squadron IAF that led the fly-past during the first Republic Day parade in 1950. Latif served as the air attaché at the Embassy of India, Washington, D.C. from 1961 to 1965.

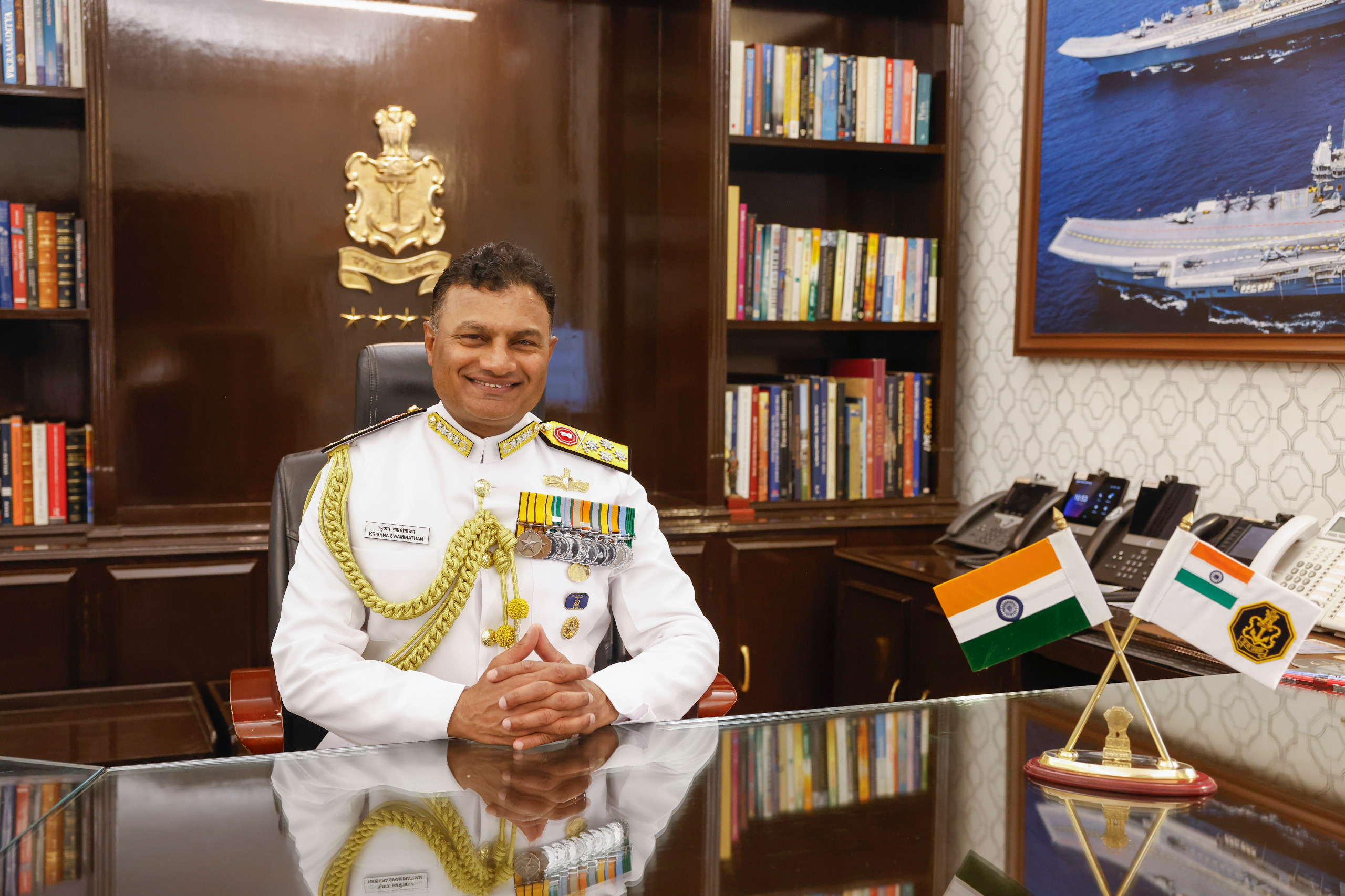
Admiral Krishna Swaminathan, chief of the naval staff

Admiral Krishna Swaminathan, PVSM, AVSM, VSM is the 27th chief of the naval staff. He previously served as the flag officer commanding-in-chief Western Naval Command and as the 39th vice chief of naval staff. His earlier appointments include chief of personnel, controller of personnel services, chief of staff of the Western Naval Command, flag officer Defence Advisory Group, flag officer commanding Western Fleet and flag officer sea training. He was the second commanding officer of the aircraft carrier INS Vikramaditya. Krishna attended the Bishop Cotton Boys' School and the Sainik School, Bijapur before graduating from the National Defence Academy, Pune. He also attended the Joint Services Command and Staff College in the United Kingdom, the higher command course at the College of Naval Warfare and the Naval War College in Newport, Rhode Island.

Captain Nadir Salahuddin Tyabji was in the Royal Indian Navy and assisted in the evacuation of hundreds of thousands of Indian settlers from Burma. Tyabji played a role in reducing Japanese advancements in Burma during World War II.

== Film and fine art ==
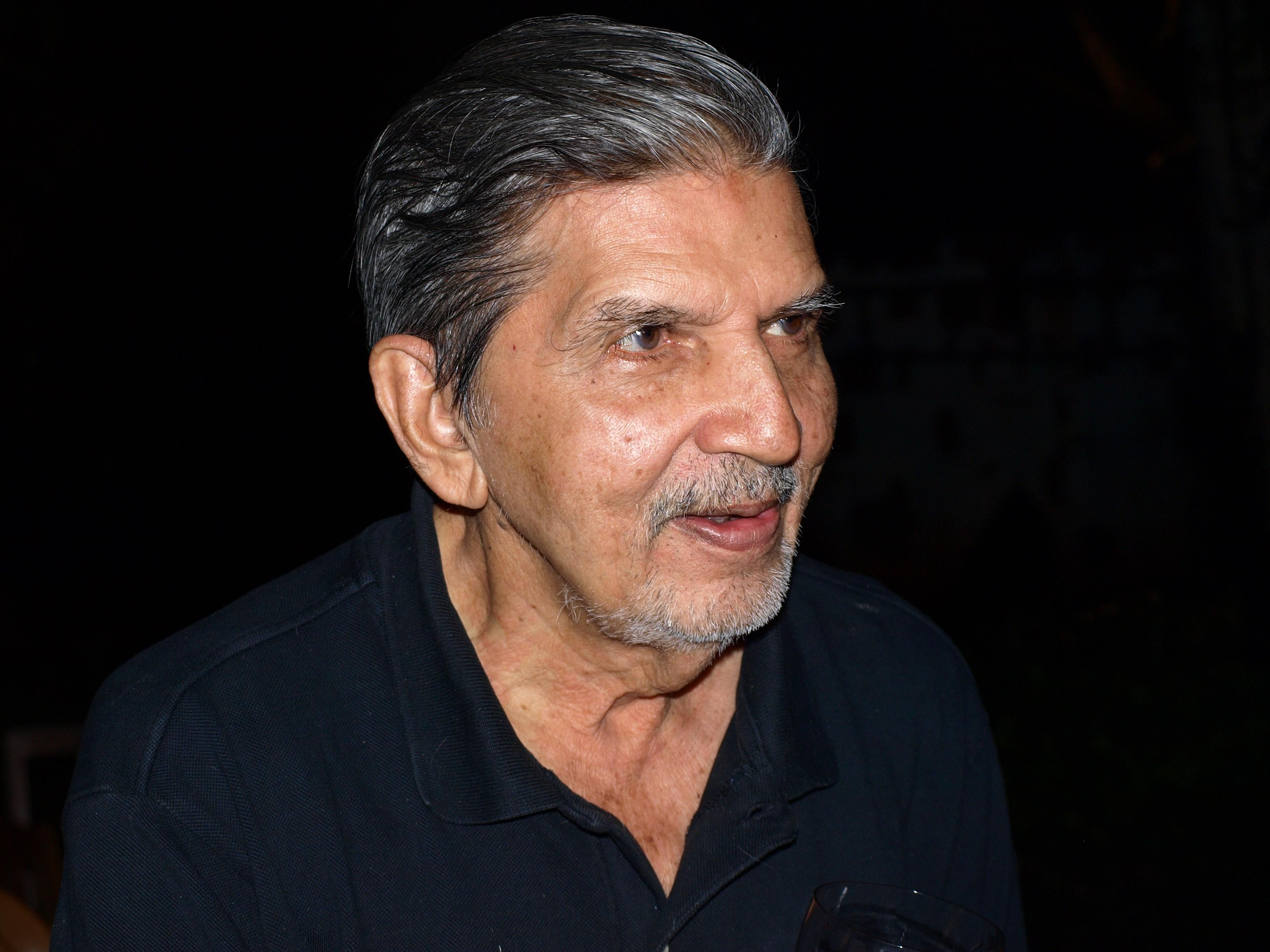
A portrait of Mário Miranda

Mario Miranda (1926–2011) Padma Vibhushan, Padma Bhushan, Padma Shri, Order of Prince Henry, Order of Isabel the Catholic, was a cartoonist and painter based in the Goa. He was married to artist Habiba Hydari, the granddaughter of Akbar Hydari. Miranda has worked with The Times of India, The Economic Times, and The Illustrated Weekly of India. Miranda studied at St. Joseph's Boys' High School, Bangalore and received a B.A. in history from St. Xavier's College, Mumbai. His caricatures have been published in magazines like Mad, Lilliput and Punch. Miranda has held solo exhibitions in over 22 countries, including the United States, Japan, Brazil, Australia, Singapore, France, Yugoslavia, and Portugal. and grand-daughter of Akbar Hydari.

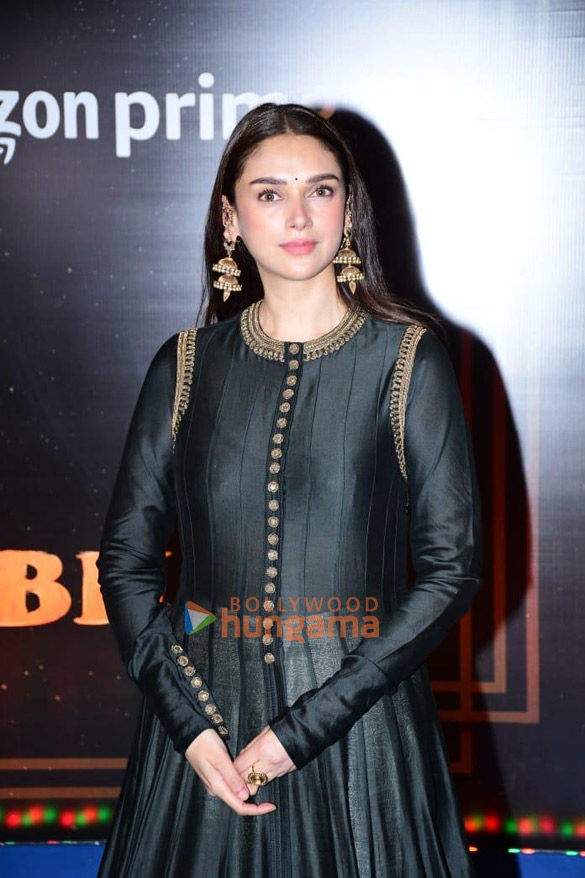
Aditi Rao Hydari

Samuel Fyzee-Rahamin is an Indian painter of portraits, figures, landscapes, and murals. Rahamin studied at the School of Art, Bombay, and for four years at the Royal Academy Schools, London under John S. Sargent and Solomon J. Solomon. Rahamin is considered to be the first Muslim artist to enter the collection of the Tate Modern Art Gallery, and possibly the first non-European artist. Rahamin has exhibited with the Bombay Art Society and assisted the Victoria and Albert Museum and the Metropolitan Museum, New York, in the reorganisation of their oriental sections. The collection of Rahamin's own paintings and other works of art which he presented to the Aiwan-e-Riffat Museum in Karachi is now housed in a separate building as the Fyzee Rehamin Art Gallery.

Nasreen Mohamedi was an Indian artist best known for her line-based drawings, and is today considered one of the most essential modern artists from India. Mohamedi's work has been the subject of remarkable revitalisation in international critical circles and has received popular acclaim over the last decade. Her work has been exhibited at the Museum of Modern Art (MoMA) in New York, the Kiran Nadar Museum of Art in New Delhi, documenta in Kassel, Germany, and at Talwar Gallery, which organised the first solo exhibition of her work outside of India in 2003. Mohamedi attended St. Martin's School of the Arts, in London, from 1954 to 1957. Aditi Rao Hydari is an Indian actress. Hydari gained attention for her performance in Sudhir Mishra's 2011 romantic thriller Yeh Saali Zindagi, which won her the Screen Award for Best Supporting Actress. Hydari graduated from Lady Shri Ram College, University of Delhi. In 2016, Hydari starred alongside Amitabh Bachchan and Farhan Akhtar in Bejoy Nambiar's crime thriller film Wazir.

Meary Tambimuttu was a Tamil poet, editor, critic and publisher, who for many years played a significant part in the literary scenes of London and New York City. In 1939 he founded the respected literary magazine Poetry London, which "soon became the best known poetry periodical in England, and Tambimuttu became widely known as a skillful editor."

== Sports ==
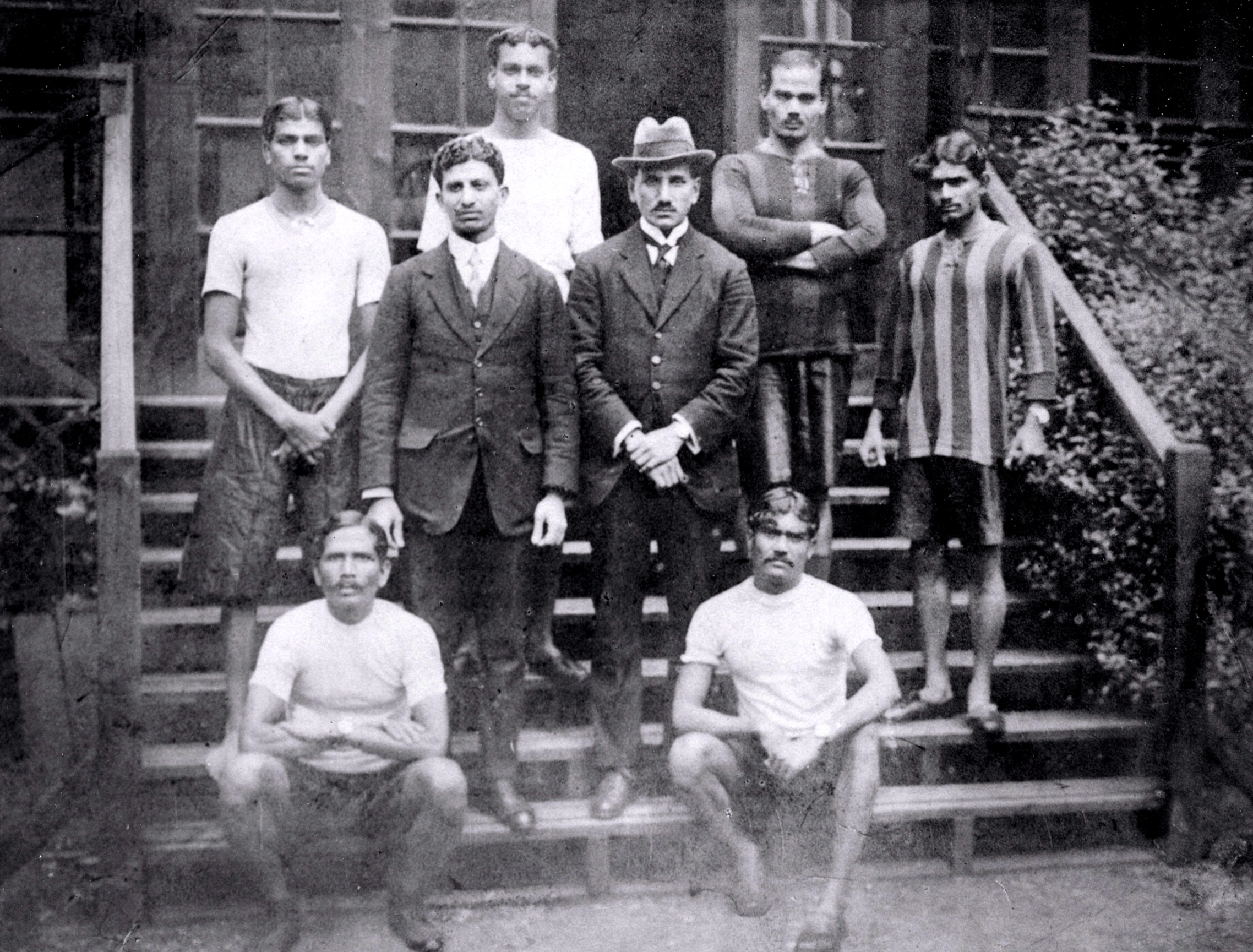
Dr Ali Azhar Hassanally Fyzee as a medical officer for the 1920 Indian Olympic Team (middle)

Ali Athar Hassanally Fyzee was part of India's first ever Olympic contingent comprising Indian nationals in the 1924 Summer Olympic Games in Paris. Fyzee competed in singles tennis and reached the round of 64. Fyzee won bronze in the 1926 World Table Tennis Championships in London. Fyzee played for the Indian Davis Cup team and participated in 15 editions of the Wimbledon Championships between 1910 and 1933. Fyzee's best result in the singles event was reaching the third round in 1926. Fyzee played at Roland Garros in 1925–27, 1929 and 1934, making the round of 16 in 1925 where he lost to René Lacoste.

Dr. Ali Azhar Hassanally Fyzee won bronze in the 1926 World Table Tennis Championships in London. Fyzee was the president of the Table Tennis Federation of India and played a role in the foundation of the International Table Tennis Federation. He reached the quarter-finals of the British Covered Court Championships in tennis losing to Stanley Doust. Fyzee played for the Indian Davis Cup team winning 4 of his 17 single matches and 6 of his 11 doubles matches. Fyzee played at Wimbledon and Roland Garros he ended his career with a 67% win rate. In 1910, Fyzee became the first Indian to win a match at Wimbledon in the main draw. Fyzee won the Herga LTC tournament at Harrow three times, the Northern Championships in Liverpool, the Roehampton tournament defeating Nicolae Mișu of Romania, the Midland Counties Championships at Edgbaston, the Welsh Covered Court Championships at Craigside, Llandudno indoors twice, and the North London Hardcourts at Highbury. Fyzee was medical officer and adviser for the first ever Indian Olympic contingent at the 1920 Summer Olympics in Antwerp.

== Business ==
Shama Bothe (Moizuddin) and Guido Bothe founded Chinkara Motors. The Chinkara (vehicle) was considered India's first Caterham or kit car. it came powered by an Isuzu sourced 1800-cc engine capable of making almost 90 hp along with a 5-speed manual gearbox.

== Family tree ==
Family tree
- Mullah Tyab Ali (1803–1863)
  founder of the family
  m. Ameena Tyab Ali
  - Al-Haj Mulla Najmuddin Tyabji
    m. Durrat-ul-Sadaf binte Feyzhyder
    - Amina Hydari (died 1949)
      social worker
      m. Sir Muhammad Akbar Nazar Ali Hydari (1869–1942), Prime Minister of Hyderabad State
      - Leila Hydari (adoptive daughter and niece)
        m. Hasan Latif
        - Idris Hasan Latif (1923–2000), Air Chief Marshal
          m. Bilkees I. Latif (1928–2017), social worker
        - Surayya Badruddin Tyabji
          m. Badruddin Tayyabji (1907–1995), diplomat
          see grandson of Badruddin Tyabji below
          - Laila Tyabji (born 1948), social worker and craft activist
      - Sir Muhammad Saleh Akbar Hydari (1894–1948), Governor of Assam
      - Iqbal Mohammed Akbar Hydari
        - Habiba Hydari
          m. Mário Miranda (1926–2011), cartoonist and painter
        - Ehsaan (Ahsan) Iqbal Hydari
          m. Vidya Rao (b. 1963), classical singer
          - Aditi Rao Hydari (born 1986), actress
      - Ali Mohammed Akbar Hydari
        m. Alys Hydari
        - Bilkees I. Latif (1928–2017), social worker
          m. Idris Hasan Latif (1923–2000), Air Chief Marshal
          see above
  - Badruddin Tyabji (1844–1906), lawyer and President of Indian National Congress
    founder of modern family prominence
    m. Rahat-un-Nafs Tyabji
    - Faiz Tyabji
      m. Salima Faiz Tyabji
      - Kamila Tyabji (1918–2004), barrister and social worker
      - Badruddin Tayyabji (1907–1995), diplomat
        m. Surayya Tyabji (1915–2004), co-designer of Indian flag
        see daughter of Badruddin Tyabji below
        - Laila Tyabji (born 1948), social worker and craft activist
          see above
      - Saif Faiz Tyabji (1904–1957), Member of Parliament
        m. Vazir Latif
        - Hasan Camruddin Tyabji
          m. Zehra Tyabji
        - Prof. Nasir Tyabji, author
    - Salman Tyabji
      m. Saada Salman Tyabji
      - Najmuddin Salman Tyabji
        m. Mona Tyabji
        - Alan Tyabji
          m. Barbara Tyabji
          - Judi Tyabji (born 1965), Canadian politician
      - Rafia Humayun Abdulali
        m. Humayun Abdulali (1914–2001), ornithologist
        - Akbar Humayun Abdulali
          m. Sumaira Abdulali (born 1961), environmental activist
    - Hanifa Rashid Futehally
      m. Rashid Futehally
      - Zafar Futehally (1919–2013), naturalist
        m. Laeeq Futehally
        - Zahida (Zai) Whitaker
          m. Romulus Whitaker (born 1943), herpetologist
      - Nazar Rashid Futehally
        m. Shamima Nazar Futehally
        - Rafia Vaseem Moizuddin
          m. Vaseem Ilyas Moizuddin
          - Laila Swaminathan
            m. Krishna Swaminathan (born 1964), Admiral
    - Husain Tyabji
      m. Mahmooda Tyabji
      - Azim Husain Tyabji (1901–1988), judge
    - Surayya Tyabji (1915–2004), co-designer of Indian flag
      m. Badruddin Tayyabji (1907–1995), diplomat
      see grandson of Badruddin Tyabji above
      - Laila Tyabji (born 1948), social worker and craft activist
        see above
    - Amina (Ameena) Abbas Tyabji
      m. Abbas Tyabji (1854–1936), freedom fighter
      see son of Shamsuddin Tyabji below
      - Shareefa Hamid Ali (1883–1971), President of All India Women's Conference
        m. Hamid Ali
        see below
      - Sohaila Tyabji
        m. Dr. Mohammad Habib (1895–1971), historian
        - Irfan Habib (born 1931), historian
          m. Sayera Siddiqui
      - Raihana Tyabji (1901–1975), freedom fighter
    - Haleema Ali Asghar Fyzee (Tyabji)
      m. Ali Asghar Fyzee
      - Asaf Ali Asghar Fyzee (1899–1981), jurist and diplomat
    - Rafia Hasan Latif
      m. Hasan C. Latif
      - Idris Hasan Latif (1923–2000), Air Chief Marshal
        m. Bilkees I. Latif (1928–2017), social worker
        see above
  - Shamsuddin Tyabji
    m. Amina bu binte Anwar Ali
    - Abbas Tyabji (1854–1936), freedom fighter
      m. Amina Tyabji
      see daughter of Badruddin Tyabji above
      - Shareefa Hamid Ali (1883–1971), President of All India Women's Conference
        m. Hamid Ali
        see above
      - Sohaila Tyabji
        m. Dr. Mohammad Habib (1895–1971), historian
        see above
        - Irfan Habib (born 1931), historian
          see above
      - Raihana Tyabji (1901–1975), freedom fighter
        see above
    - Zeenuth Moizuddin Abdul Ali
      m. Moizuddin Jivabhai Abdul Ali
      - Salim Ali (1896–1987), ornithologist "Birdman of India"
        m. Tehmina
      - Hamid Ali
        m. Shareefa Hamid Ali (1883–1971), President of All India Women's Conference
        see above
  - Shujauddin Tyabji
    m. Durrat Vali binte Mulla Jivabhai
    - Amirunnisa Fyzee
      m. Haji Hassanally bin Feyzhyder
      - Ali Asghar Fyzee
        m. Haleema Fyzee
        see daughter of Badruddin Tyabji above
        - Asaf Ali Asghar Fyzee (1899–1981), jurist and diplomat
          see above
      - Dr. Ali Azhar Hassanally Fyzee (1880–1951), tennis player and doctor
      - Ali Athar Fyzee (1891–1964), tennis player
        m. Doris Ali Athar Fyzee
      - Atiya Fyzee (1877–1967), author
        m. Samuel Fyzee-Rahamin (1880–1964), painter
      - Zehra Fyzee (fl. early 20th century), writer and playwright
      - Princess Nazli Rafiya Begum Fyzee (1894–1970)
        m. H.H. Nawab Sidi Sir Ahmad Khan Sidi Ibrahim Khan III GCIE, Nawab of Janjira
  - Justice Camruddin Tyabji
    m. Begum Sahib Khawar Sultana Tyabji
    - Dilshad Begum
      m. Syed Mohammed Fateh Ali Mirza, grandson of Mansur Ali Khan (1830–1884), Nawab of Bengal
      - President Syed Iskander Ali Mirza (1899–1969), first President of Pakistan
        m. Nahid Mirza (1919–2019), First Lady of Pakistan
    - Kazim Jan Camaruddin Tyabji
      m. Jehanara Begum Tyabji
      - Begum Malik Taj Hilaly
        m. Agha Hilaly (1911–2015), diplomat
        - Zafar Hilaly (born 1945), diplomat
  - Zainab bu Zauja-e-Shaikh Dawood
    m. Shaikh Dawood bin Shaikh Ahmed
    - Badrunnisa binte Shaikh Dawood
      m. Mulla Jeevabhai bin Mulla Mohammed Ali
      - Wazirunnisa binte Shaikh Ali Fateh Ali
        m. Khan Bahadur Dr. Shamsuddin bin Mulla Jeevabhai Mohamedi
        - Mohammed Ashraf Dr. Shamsuddin Mohamedi
          m. Zynab Mohamedi
          - Nasreen Mohamedi (1937–1990), artist
  - Kulsum Faizunnisa Tyabji
    m. Mulla Shaikh Fateh Ali bin Shaikh Ahmed
    - Faiz Mohammed Futehally
      - Ateka Hadi Tyabji
        m. Mohammed Hadi Camaruddin Tyabji
        - Safia Hadi Tyabji
          m. Tambimuttu (1915–1983), poet and literary editor
