= Mohammad Habib =

Indian historian (1895–1971)

- Born: 1895
- Died: 1971 (aged 75–76)
- Spouse: Sohaila Habib (née Tyabji)
- Children: Irfan Habib , Kamal Habib
- Relatives: see Tyabji family, Abbas Tyabji (father-in-law)

Academic background
- Education: M.A.O. College; Oxford University

Academic work
- Doctoral students: Syed Anwarul Haq Haqqi

Mohammad Habib (1895–1971) was an Indian historian, who worked at the Aligarh Muslim University. He was involved in the Indian Independence movement, and was an associate of both Gandhi and Jawaharlal Nehru.

He was a candidate in the 1967 Indian vice-presidential election, which he lost to V. V. Giri. Habib, contesting as an independent candidate, received 28.55% of the votes.

== Early life and education ==
Habib was a son of Mohammed Naseem, a barrister in Lucknow. His wife Sohaila Tyabji was the daughter of Abbas Tyabji, a noted disciple of Mahatma Gandhi. Their sons are Kamal Habib and Irfan Habib, who is a Professor Emeritus of history at Aligarh Muslim University.

Habib studied at the Muhammadan Anglo-Oriental (M.A.O.) School and College (now Aligarh Muslim University. He topped the B.A. examination of the Allahabad University in 1916. The Muhammadan Anglo-Oriental College was then affiliated to Allahabad University. He then proceeded to New College, Oxford for higher studies. He became president of the Oxford Majlis for one term.

It was in Oxford that he received his baptism in nationalism. The ideas of his liberal-minded tutor Ernest Barker, a meeting with Sarojini Naidu and the patronage of Maulana Mohammad Ali, who visited London during his stay in England, played a role in shaping his ideas. At the call of Mohammad Ali, he returned to India to teach at Jamia Millia Islamia but apparently never became a regular member of its staff. When the non-co-operation movement was called off in 1922, he accepted an appointment as a Reader, and almost immediately afterwards as Professor, at the newly chartered Aligarh Muslim University.

== Career ==
In 1926, he won the election of the U.P. Legislative Council as a member of the (Swaraj Party). He admired Jawaharlal Nehru and donated a considerable part of his income to the Indian National Congress.

At Aligarh, Habib made his mark in many ways. As an academician, his great emphasis was on writing history based on original sources, and he encouraged the study of aspects of history other than dynastic or political rule. He himself wrote on social and cultural history, and painstakingly unravelled the history of Muslim mystics for some of whom he came to cherish an almost personal affection.

In the forties, his interest in Marxism heightened and in 1952 he presented, in a remarkable piece, his introduction to a reprint of volume II of Elliot and Dowson's The History of India, as Told by Its Own Historians, which was an interpretation of early medieval India deeply influenced by Marxist ideas. He visited Paris to represent his country at the UN General Assembly, followed by a trip to Peking (now Beijing) in 1952 on the first goodwill mission from India to the People's Republic of China. Both the visits strengthened him in his belief in the need for India to help countries resisting imperialism. He kept nursing the sapling of liberalism in the portals of his university.

== Post-retirement ==
He unsuccessfully contested for the office of the Vice-President of India in 1967 as a candidate of the combined opposition.

== Death ==
He died in 1971.

== Legacy ==
The Mohammad Habib Hall of AMU was named after him in 1972. It has three hostels: Chakraverty Hostel, Umaruddin Hostel and Haider Khan Hostel.

== Selected publications ==
- A Comprehensive History of India: The Delhi Sultanate (A.D. 1206-1526) (general editor with K. A. Nizami)
- Hazrat Amir Khusrau of Delhi. 1st Pakistan ed. Lahore : Islamic Book Service [1979].
- Hazrat Nizamuddin Auliya: hayat aur talimat.Dihli : Shubah-yi Urdu, Dihli Yunivarsiti, [1972] University of Delhi. Dept. of Urdu. Silsilah-i matbuat-i Shubah-yi Urdu [1970].
- The political theory of the Delhi sultanate (including a translation of Ziauddin Barani's Fatawa-i Jahandari, ...) Allahabad, Kitab Mahal [1961].
- Politics and society during the early medieval period: collected works of Professor Mohammad Habib / edited by Khaliq Ahmad Nizami. New Delhi : People's Pub. House [1974–1981].
- Some aspects of the foundation of the Delhi Sultanat [sic]. Delhi, Dr. K. M. Ashraf Memorial Committee; [sole distributors: Kalamkar Cooperative, 1968] Dr. K. M. Ashraf memorial lecture, 1966
- Sultan Mahmud of Ghaznin. 2d ed.Delhi, S. Chand [1967].
