= Badruddin Tyabji (diplomat) =

Indian diplomat (1907–1995)

Badruddin Tayyabji

Ambassador of India to Germany
- In office 1958–1960
- Preceded by: A. C. N. Nambiar

Vice Chancellor of Aligarh Muslim University
- In office 7 November 1962 – 28 February 1965
- Chancellor: Taher Saifuddin
- Preceding: Bashir Hussain Zaidi
- Succeeded by: Ali Yavar Jung

Ambassador of India to Iran
- In office 30 October 1956 – 29 August 1958
- Succeeded by: Triloki Nath Kaul

Personal details
- Born: 1907 Bombay, Bombay Presidency, British India
- Died: 1995 (aged 87–88) Mumbai, Maharashtra, India
- Spouse: Surayya Tyabji
- Relations: see Tyabji family
- Children: Laila Tyabji, Adil, Khalid, Hindal Haider

Badruddin Faiz Tyabji (1907–1995) was a senior Indian Civil Service officer, who served as vice-chancellor of the Aligarh Muslim University, from 1962 to 1965. While serving as a diplomat in 1948, he had undertaken the task of starting the Embassy of India, Brussels. He also served as Indian ambassador in Jakarta, Tehran, Bonn and Tokyo.

== Early life ==
He was born in Bombay. His father was Faiz Tyabji, a judge of Bombay High Court. His sister Kamila Tyabji was a lawyer and philanthropist.

== Career ==
Historian Trevor Royle wrote in his book The Last Days of the Raj that Tyabji designed the final form of the current National Flag of India, the tricolour with Ashoka's Dharmachakra in the centre, and that his wife, Surayya Tyabji, made the first copy that flew on Nehru's car on the night of independence.

Royle wrote,

"By one of those contradictions which run through India’s history, the national flag was designed by a Muslim, Badr-ud-Din Tyabji. Originally the tricolour was to have contained the spinning-wheel symbol ( charkha ) used by Gandhi but this was a party symbol, which Tyabji thought might strike the wrong note. After much persuasion Gandhi agreed to the wheel because the Emperor Ashoka was venerated by Hindu and Muslim alike. The flag which flew on Nehru’s car that night had been specially made by Tyabji’s wife."

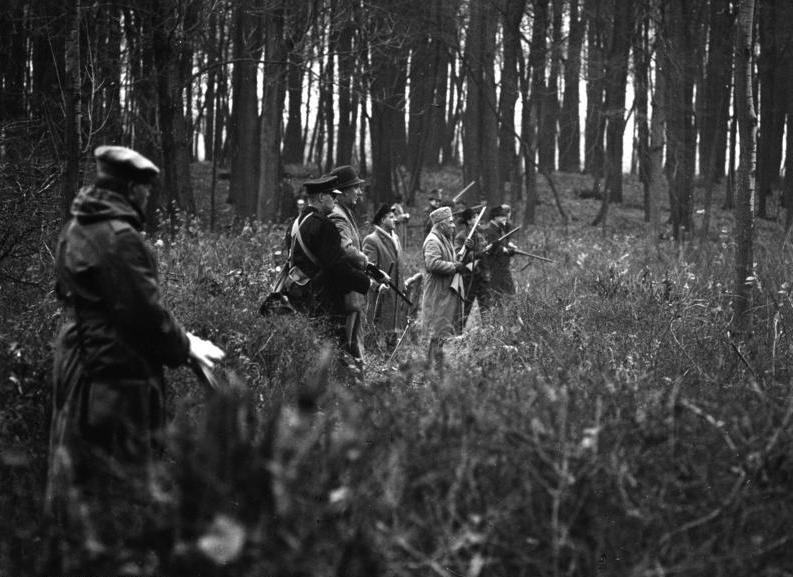
Diplomat hunt in Geistholz (Oelde/Westphalia), November 18, 1960. The Federal President's hunt in the ghost wood, with the participation of the Federal President Dr. Lübke, the Prime Minister of North Rhine-Westphalia and Lower Saxony and the Diplomatic Corps. The most successful shooter was the Indian ambassador to the Federal Republic, H.E. Badruddin Tyabji.

It was approved, accepted and adopted in its present form during a meeting of the Constituent Assembly held on 22 July 1947, and it became the official flag of the Dominion of India on 15 August 1947.

His daughter is Laila Tyabji, a Padma Shri awardee. His grand-father was the Indian National Congress leader, Badruddin Tyabji.
