= Saif Tyabji =

Solicitor, mathematician, educator & 2nd MP of Jalna

Member of Parliament, Lok Sabha
- In office 1957 – 12 November 1957 (died)
- Preceded by: Hanumantrao Ganeshrao Vaishnav
- Succeeded by: Ramrao Narayan Rao
- Constituency: Jalna

Personal details
- Born: 13 December 1904
- Died: 12 November 1957 (aged 52)
- Resting place: Mumbai, Maharashtra, India
- Party: Indian National Congress
- Spouse: Vazir Latif
- Relations: see Tyabji family
- Children: Hasan Camruddin Tyabji (Son) Salima Rafia Tyabji (Daughter) Prof. Nasir Tyabji (Son)
- Parents: Faiz Hasan Tyabji (father); Salima Faiz Tyabji (mother)
- Occupation: Mathematician; Solicitor; Politician
- Known for: female Education

Saif Faiz Badruddin Tyabji (1904–1957) was a solicitor, mathematician, an educationist passionately devoted to the cause of female education, and a nationalist committed to the idea of India. He was closely associated with the Anjuman-i Islam of Bombay from the 1930s till his death in November 1957. He was a Congress Member of Parliament in 1957 from Jalna in Maharashtra.

== Education & work ==
Tyabji was grandson of an early president of India's Congress party, Badruddin Tyabji (1844–1906). Though he was an engineer educated at Cambridge, his career as a lawyer and a judge were perhaps surpassed by his role as a Member of Parliament representing the Congress party in newly independent India. He was in the forefront of reform of his own community. He realised the lack of English education amongst the Muslims had hurt them. He resolutely opposed the purdah system for Muslim women as it prevented their education and social advancement.

In 1955 Tyabji wrote a series of essays in the influential Urdu newspaper Inquilab, which later were translated to English and published under the title, The Future of Muslims in India. He felt that Muslims should do a lot more than vote for India's dominant party - they should join it and influence its policies. Like other kinds of Indians, he felt Muslims had to "take an active part in the formation of a new Indian Culture". However, he noted "if Muslims sit back with folded arms, we can rest assured that the new Indian Culture will have little to do with the achievements of this country". Tyabji's other suggestions were that Muslims ask for technical and commercial education, rather than merely study the humanities and join the ranks of the educated unemployed.

== Names after ==
- The Anjuman-I-Islam Girls High School and Junior College of Arts and Science, based in Mumbai, was renamed 'Anjuman-I-Islam Saif Tyabji Girls High School and Junior College' on 31 May 1982, in honor of its former president, Mr. Saif Tyabji. Mr. Saif Tyabji, a practicing solicitor and the grandson of Sir Badruddin Tyabji, had been actively associated with the Anjuman. He served as its Honorary Secretary since 1935 and had also held the position of President of the parent body. His contributions greatly fostered the progress and advancement of the institution.

== Death ==
His early death on 12 November 1957 was described by his cousin, the distinguished conservationist Zafar Futehally as, "a great tragedy for the Muslims of India".
