= Azim Tyabji =

- Died: 11 December 2003; Vadodara
- Family: Tyabji family

Azim Tyabji was a Muslim scholar and reformer.

He was the son of Hussein Tyabji, and grandson of Justice Badruddin Tyabji, who was one of the founders and presidents of the Indian National Congress and the Anjuman-e-Islam college of Mumbai. He worked in several administrative positions in the country.

Tyabji died at a grand age of 100 in Vadodara on 11 December 2003.
