= Surayya Tyabji =

Designer of Indian's Modern Flag

- Born: 1919; Hyderabad, Hyderabad State, British India
- Died: 1978 (aged 58–59); Mumbai, Maharashtra, India
- Known for: Contributing to the design of the Indian national flag
- Spouse: Badruddin Tyabji
- Children: Laila Tyabji
- Family: see Tyabji family

Surayya Tyabji (1978) was an Indian artist who designed the current Indian national flag by adding the Ashoka Chakra from the Lion Capital of Ashoka, replacing the Charkha on the 1931 flag of the Indian National Congress.

== Work ==
The Swaraj flag, officially adopted by the Indian National Congress in 1931

Current national flag of India

Historian Trevor Royle wrote in his book The Last Days of the Raj that Badruddin Tyabji designed the final form of the current Indian national flag. Surayya Tyabji made the first copy that flew on Jawahar Lal Nehru's car on the night of independence:

"By one of those contradictions which run through Indian's history, the national flag was designed by a Muslim, Badr-ud-Din Tyabji. Originally the Flag was to have contained the Charka symbol used by Gandhi. but this was a party symbol, which Tyabji thought might strike the wrong note. After much persuasion Gandhi agreed to the verse because the Emperor Asoka was venerated by Hindu and Muslim alike. The flag which flew on Nehru's car that night had been specially made by Tyabji's wife."

She also served as the member of various committees under the Constituent Assembly.

Surayya Tyabji's daughter, social worker, designer and activist Laila Tyabji wrote in 2018 that both her mother and her father were involved in the design of the flag, having been commissioned by Nehru to do so, as a development of a design by the soldier, scientist and lecturer Pingali Venkayya.

== Family and ancestry ==
She belonged to the Tyabji clan. She was the niece of Sir Akbar Hydari, who served as the Prime Minister of Hyderabad from 1937 to 1941, and granddaughter of Lady Amina Hydari, who championed the cause of Muslim women's education in Hyderabad. She was married to Badruddin Tyabji, a civil servant and later the Vice Chancellor of Aligarh Muslim University.
