= Badruddin Tyabji =

Indian lawyer, activist, and politician (1844 – 1906)

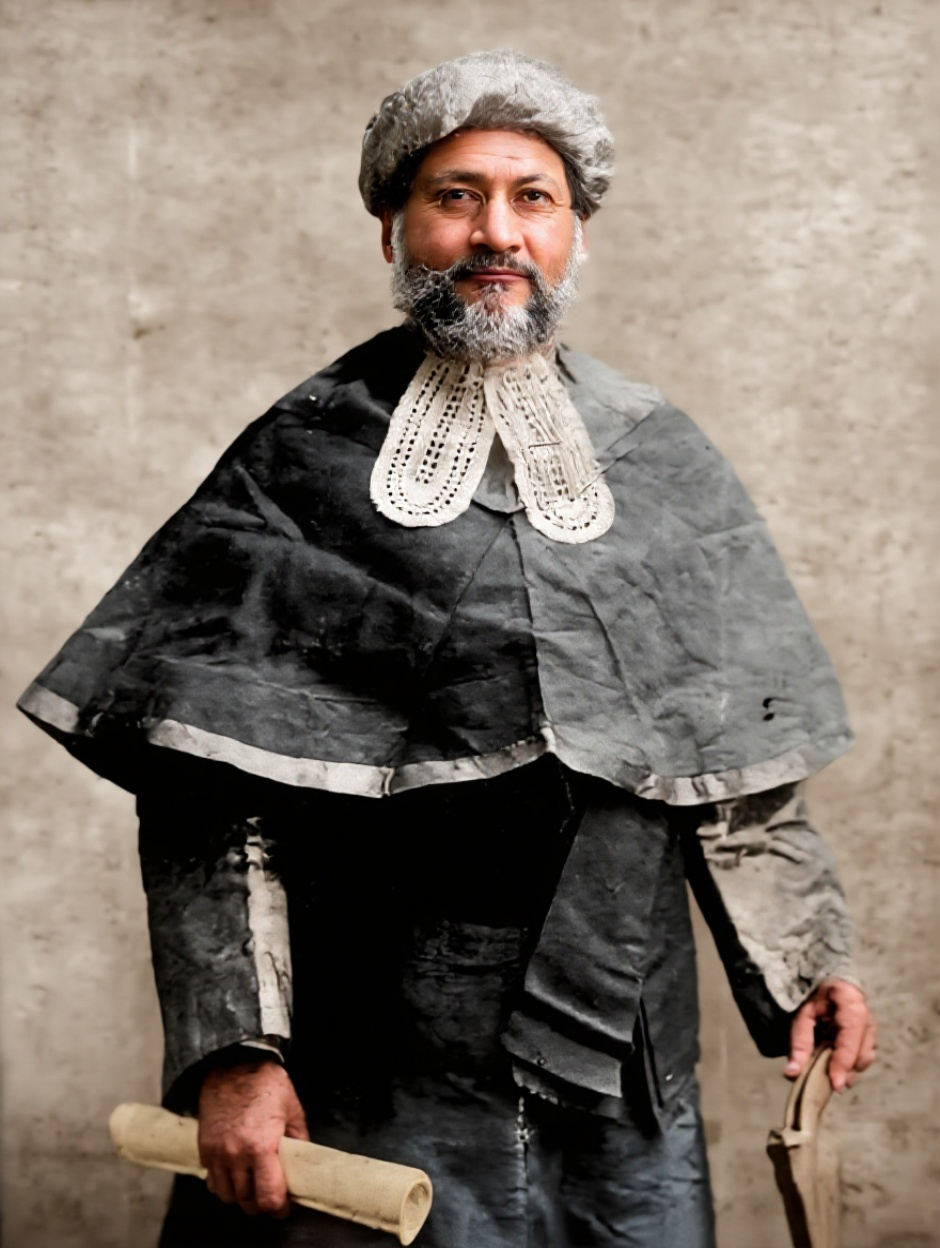

3rd President of the Indian National Congress
- In office 1887–1888
- Preceded by: Dadabhai Naoroji
- Succeeded by: George Yule

Personal details
- Born: Badruddin Tyabji; 10 October 1844 Bombay, Bombay Presidency, British India
- Died: 19 August 1906 (aged 61) London, England, United Kingdom
- Relations: Tyabji family
- Education: University College London; Middle Temple
- Occupation: Lawyer, activist, politician
- Known for: Co-founder and 3rd President of Indian National Congress, First Indian Barrister of Bombay

Badruddin Tyabji (10 October 1844 – 19 August 1906) was an Indian lawyer, activist, and politician during the British Raj. Tyabji was the first Indian to practice as a barrister of the High Court of Bombay. He also served as the third President of the Indian National Congress. He was one of the founding members and the first Muslim president of the Indian National Congress. He founded the Anjuman-i-Islam College in Bombay in 1874. It started with one school and today it has more than eighty institutions from pre-primary schools to graduate and postgraduate level. Tyabji is often referred to as the most prominent member of the Tyabji family.

== Early life ==
=== Background ===
Tyabji was born on 10 October 1844 in Bombay, part of the Bombay Presidency of British India. He was the son of Mullah Tyab Ali Bhai Mian, a member of the Sulaimani Bohra community, and a scion of an old Cambay emigrant Arab family.

His father had sent all of his seven sons to Europe for further studies, at a time when English education was considered anathema for Muslims in India. His elder brother, Camruddin, had been the first Indian solicitor admitted in England and Wales, and inspired the 15-year-old Badruddin to join the Bar.

=== Education ===
After learning Urdu and Persian at Dada Makhra's Madrassa, he joined the Elphinstone Institution (now Elphinstone College) in Bombay, after which he was sent to France for eye treatment. In 1860, at the age of sixteen, he joined Newbury High Park College in London.

Whilst in England, his father gave him letters of introduction to Lord Ellenborough, the retired Governor-General of India After Newbury, Tyabji enrolled at University College London a member institution of the University of London and Middle Temple in 1863. Suffering from deteriorating eyesight he returned to Bombay in late 1864 but resumed his studies at the Middle Temple in late 1865 and was called to the Bar in April 1867.

== Career ==
=== Return to India ===
On his return to Bombay in December 1867, Tyabji became the first Indian barrister in the High Court of Bombay.

Tyabji was nominated to the Bombay Municipal Corporation in 1873. He was a member of the University of Bombay senate between 1875 and 1905 and appointed to the Bombay Legislative Council in 1882, resigning in 1886 owing to ill health. Along with Pherozeshah Mehta and Kashinath Trimbak Telang, he was largely responsible for forming the Bombay Presidency Association in 1885, a body which championed Indian interests and hosted the first meeting of the Indian National Congress in Bombay at the end of 1885.

=== Involvement with Indian National Congress ===
Badruddin and his elder brother Camruddin were deeply involved in the founding of the Indian National Congress. Tyabji was instrumental in building the national scope of the Congress by working to gain support from both Hindus and Muslims and during his time as President of the Indian National Congress between 1887 and 1888, he focused on uniting the Muslim community. To promote social interaction among the city's Muslims, Tyabji was instrumental in founding both the Islam Club and the Islam Gymkhana.

In response to criticisms that Muslims should boycott the Congress, Tyabji declared that he had denounced all communal and sectarian prejudices. To further conciliate Muslims and bring them into the Congress fold, Tyabji introduced Resolution No. XIII at the 1888 Allahabad Congress stating stated, "That no subject shall be passed for discussion by the Subject Committee, or allowed to be discussed at any Congress...to the introduction of which the Hindu or Mahomedan Delegates as a body object...provided that this rule shall refer only to subjects in regard to which the Congress has not already definitely pronounced an opinion." This measure was introduced with intention of appealing to Muslims by limiting the scope of Congress activities to only those items that both Muslims and Hindus agreed upon.

Despite these overtures, many Muslim leaders were still sceptical of Congress's ability to represent them. Chief among these critics was Syed Ahmad Khan, who in an open letter to Tyabji, wrote, "I ask my friend Budruddin Tyabji to leave aside those insignificant points in the proposals of the Congress in which Hindus and Mahomedans agree (for there are no things in the world which have no points in common -- there are many things in common between a man and a pig), and to tell me what fundamental political principles of the Congress are not opposed to the interests of Mahomedans."

Despite these criticisms, Tyabji continued to believe in Congress as a capable institution for forwarding the collective interests as Indians as a whole and he sought to set the example for cross-communal cooperation. In his Presidential Address to the 1887 Madras Congress, Tyabji reassured members of his faith, stating, "I, at least, not merely in my individual capacity but as representing the Anjuman-i-Islam of Bombay, do not consider that there is anything whatever in the position or the relations of the different communities of India -- be they Hindus, Musalmans, Parsis, or Christians -- which should induce the leaders of any one community to stand aloof from the others in their efforts to obtain those great general reforms, those great general rights, which are for the common benefit of us all; and which, I feel assured, have only to be earnestly and unanimously pressed upon Government to be granted to us." He was considered among the moderate Muslims during the freedom movement of India.

=== Later life ===
In June 1895 Tyabji was made a judge of the Bombay High Court, the first Muslim and the third Indian to be so elevated. In 1902, he became the first Indian to hold the post of Chief Justice of the Bombay High Court. Tyabji was also active in women's emancipation and worked to weaken the zenana system. He sent all of his daughters to be educated in Bombay and in 1904 he sent two of them to boarding school in Haslemere in England.

== Death ==
On 26 August 1906, while on a furlough in London, England Badruddin Tyabji died suddenly of a heart attack.

== Family ==
He was married to Rahat-un-Nafs and together they had eighteen children. His nephew was Abbas Tyabji. His grandsons included Saif Tyabji, Azim Tyabji, Asaf Ali Asghar Fyzee, and Badruddin Tyabji. His great granddaughter is Laila Tyabji.
