= 1967 Indian vice presidential election =

Vice-presidential election in India

← 1962	6 May 1967	1969 →
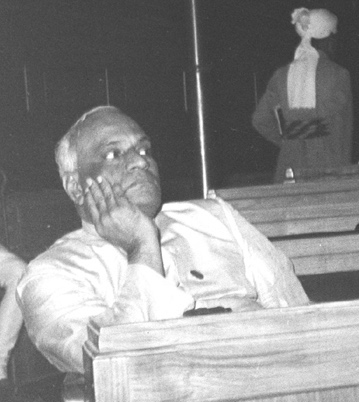
Nominee	Varahagiri Venkata Giri	Mohammad Habib
Party	Independent	Independent
Home state	Andhra Pradesh	Uttar Pradesh
Electoral vote	483	193
Percentage	71.45%	28.55%
Vice President before election
Zakir Husain
Independent
Elected Vice President
Varahagiri Venkata Giri
Independent

The 1967 Indian vice presidential election was held on 6 May 1967 to elect vice president of India. V. V. Giri was elected for the post.

== Results ==
Result of the Indian vice-presidential election, 1967
Candidate	Electoral Votes	% of Votes
V. V. Giri	483	71.45
Mohammad Habib	193	28.55
Total	676	100.00
Valid Votes	676	99.56
Invalid Votes	3	0.44
Turnout	679	90.65
Abstentions	70	9.35
Electors	749	

== See also ==
- 1967 Indian presidential election
