= Laila Tyabji =

Indian craft designer and social activist (b. 1947)

- Born: 2 May 1947 (age 79); Delhi, India
- Occupations: Craft designer and social activist
- Years active: 1968–present
- Parents: Badruddin Tyabji (father); Surayya Tyabji (mother)
- Relatives: Tyabji family
- Awards: Padma Shri; Aid to Artisans Preservation of Craft Award; NIFT Lifetime Achievement Award; Chishti Harmony Award; Limca Book of Records Person of the Year

Laila Tyabji (born 2 May 1947) is an Indian social worker, designer, writer, and craft activist. She is one of the founders of Dastkar, a Delhi-based non governmental organization, working for the revival of traditional crafts in India. She was honored by the Government of India in 2012 with the Indian civilian award of Padma Shri. She is the daughter of late Badruddin Tyabji, ICS, who was a senior Indian civil servant and diplomat.

== Biography ==
Beyond her image as a sophisticated and stylish woman, Laila could make and hold a bridge with craftspeople. She has been there for them through calamity and crisis; from teaching them how to price their products to valuing themselves. The respect and affection they have for her is rare, says Archana Seth, a Delhi based entrepreneur and author of the book, Shifting Sands, Kutch: Textiles, Traditions, Transformations.

Laila Tyabji was born in Delhi on 2 May 1947 to an Indian civil servant as one of his four children. Her early schooling was in schools abroad and at the Welham Girls' School in Dehradun. She subsequently continued her studies in art at the Faculty of Fine Arts, MS University, Vadodara. Later, she went to Japan to study with Toshi Yoshida, the well-known Japanese printmaking artist, before returning to India to start a career as a freelance designer. Assignments included graphic and interior design, costumes and sets for the theatre, garments and textiles.

The turning point in her career came when Tyabji was asked by the Gujarat State Handloom and Handicrafts Development Corporation Ltd to document, revive and design the traditional handicrafts of Kutch tradition. The assignment, originally fixed for 3 months got prolonged to six. Returning from Kutch, Tyabji worked as a merchandiser for Taj Khazana, a chain of luxury lifestyle stores run by Taj Group of Hotels, dealing in Indian arts and crafts. However, the difficulties of getting small rural artisans to benefit from and become a sustainable part of the mainstream retail chain gave Tyabji the idea of starting an organisation that would act as a bridge between craftspeople and urban buyers.

A meeting with Bunny Page, a Parsi woman with the same concerns and ideas, and many discussions and meetings, resulted in Tyabji co-founding Dastkar with five other women in 1981. The objective was to give traditional craftspeople the design, product development, market information, and entrepreneurship training that would help them regain their place in the mainstream market. The Dastkar Bazaars, where craftspeople came directly to sell their own products in the Metro market, were both a sales opportunity and a learning place for craftspeople who had never previously encountered their urban customers. It was a novel idea at that time – much imitated since. The inaugural Dastkar Bazaar was held in New Delhi, the same year at the Triveni Kala Sangam. Bazaars in Mumbai, Kolkota, Pune, Bangalore, Chennai, and other Indian cities followed, and became annual events.

The first NATURE BAZAAR in 1995 was an attempt (inspired by Valmik Thapar, the well known tiger expert and wildlife conservationist) to get craftspeople to use Nature as a source of both creative inspiration and raw material . It has since become a regular event, with a permanent venue at Kisan Haat, Mehrauli, Delhi. Over the last 35 years, Dastkar and Tyabji have worked with numerous crafts organisations and NGOs to use craft skills as a means of earning and empowerment. She is credited with revolutionizing the craft industry in India by developing a market for Indian crafts, modernizing the artisans' skills, and acting as the liaising link between the artisans and the buyers. Dastkar operates on the policy of leaving the ownership of the goods to the artisans who produced them, retaining a 10 percent revenue towards the operating costs. It provides the artisans with entrepreneurial training and assists them with credit, designs, and product development techniques. The organization has a producer group base of over 700 artisan groups, collectively comprising over 1 lakh craftspeople.

Under the aegis of Dastkar, Tyabji has worked with Self-Employed Women's Association of India (SEWA), a similar non-governmental organization founded by renowned Gandhian, Ela Bhatt, URMUL, Sandur Kushal Kala Kendra, Rangsutra, SASHA, Berozgar Mahila Kalyan Samiti, and many others. Other major DASTKAR projects are in Kashmir for the social reestablishment of the victims of terrorism, in Ranthambore, for the rehabilitation of the people who were evacuated for the National Park and in Bellary for the revival of the dying art of Lambani embroidery. She is associated with the artisans across the country such as Banjara Needle Crafts and Rabari mirror work craftswoman of Kutch and Maharashtra, Chikan craft workers of Lucknow, gond, Phad, mata ni pacheri and madhubani painters, Kasuti embroidery artisans of Karnataka, handloom weavers in Bihar and Karnataka, and the leather, textile and terracotta artisans in Rajasthan.

Laila Tyabji authored Threads and Voices – Behind the Indian Textile Tradition, published in 2007, and has written numerous articles in Indian journals. Unmarried by choice, she lives in Delhi, designing, writing, and speaking on behalf of crafts and craftspeople at her Andheria Modh office as Chairperson, Dastkar.

== Awards and recognitions ==
In 2003, Tyabji was awarded the Aid to Artisans' Preservation of Craft Award, the first Asian and the second overall recipient of the award, the investiture ceremony taking place in New York. Eleven years later in 2012, the Government of India honored her with Padma Shri, the fourth–highest Indian civilian award. She is also a recipient of the NIFT Lifetime Achievement Award and the Chishti Harmony Award. The Limca Book of Records, an Indian repository of records and achievements, named Laila Tyabji as the Person of the Year, in 2014.

== See also ==
- Dastkar
- Lambani
- Banjara Needle Crafts
- Kasuti
