= Banjara Needle Crafts =

Banjara needle crafts are traditional handmade fabrics made by Banjaras in India. They are made in tribals Lambada habitation known as Thanda.
