= Abbas Tyabji =

Indian freedom fighter

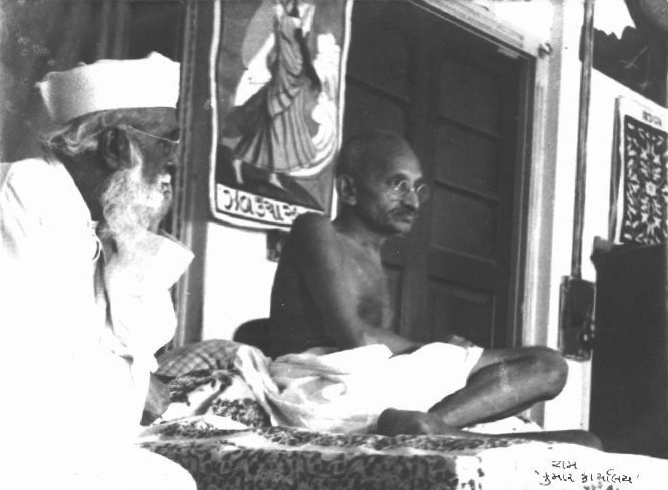
- Abbas Tyabji and Mahatma Gandhi in 1934
- Born: 1 February 1854; Baroda state, Bombay Presidency, British India
- Died: 9 June 1936 (aged 82); Mussoorie, United Provinces, Indian Empire
- Other name: Grand Old Man of Gujarat
- Political party: Indian National Congress
- Relatives: Salim Ali (nephew)
- Family: Tyabji family

Abbas Tyabji (1 February 1854 – 9 June 1936) was an Indian freedom fighter from Gujarat, and an associate of Mahatma Gandhi. He also served as the Chief Justice of Baroda State. His grandson is historian Irfan Habib.

== Family and background ==
Abbas Tyabji was born to a Sulaimani Bohra Arab family of Cambay in Gujarat. He was the son of Shamsuddin Tyabji and grandson of Mullah Tyab Ali, a merchant. His father's elder brother was Badruddin Tyabji, first Indian to become a barrister and then later on a judge of the Bombay High Court and an early, loyalist president of the Indian National Congress.

== Early life ==
Abbas Tyabji was born in Baroda State, where his father was in the service of the Gaekwad Maharaja. He was educated in England, where he lived for eleven years. His nephew, the ornithologist Salim Ali, says in his autobiography,

[Abbas Tyabji], though a moderate nationalist at heart, would stand no adverse criticism of the British as a people, or of the Raj, and even a mildly disparaging remark about the King-Emperor or the royal family was anathema to him. . . If he had any strong sentiments about Swadeshi, he certainly didn't show it by precept or example. . . This being so, he naturally disagreed vehemently with Gandhiji and his methods of political mass agitation. . . In other respects, his moderate but simmering nationalism and his absolute integrity and fairness as a judge were widely recognized and lauded, even by leftist Congressmen and anti-British extremists.

As an England-educated barrister, Tyabji landed a job as judge in the court of Baroda State as a matter of course. With a generous salary added to his sizable family inheritance, and the respectability of a high-government appointment, the family was ensconced in the higher echelons of elite, westernized society, as compradors of the British Raj. For the entirety of his career, Tyabji remained a staunch loyalist of the Raj. He raised his children in a westernized manner, sending them to England for higher education, and in time, he rose in the judiciary to become Chief Justice of the High Court of Baroda State and retired.

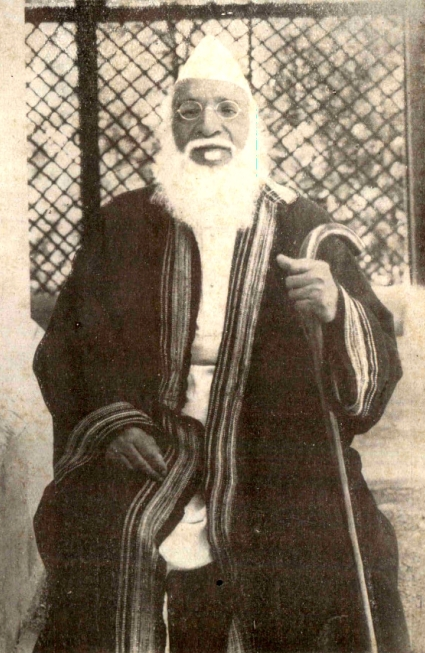

He was an early proponent of women's rights, supporting women's education and social reform. He broke with the prevailing custom of the times by disregarding purdah restrictions and sending his daughters to school. His daughter, Sohaila Habib, was the mother of the eminent historian Irfan Habib.

== Indian Independence Movement ==
Abbas Tyabji attended, along with Mahatma Gandhi, the Social Conference held at Godhra in 1917. At the time, he was seen as a model of Britishness, leading a Western lifestyle and wearing impeccably tailored English suits. All of that changed after the Jallianwala Bagh massacre in 1919, when he was appointed by the Indian National Congress as chairman of an independent fact-finding committee. He cross-examined hundreds of eyewitnesses and victims of the atrocities committed by Reginald Dyer, reacting with "nausea and revulsion". That experience drove him to become a loyal follower of Gandhi, giving strong support to the cause of the Indian National Congress.

Leaving his Western style aristocratic life behind, he adopted many of the symbols of the Gandhi movement, burning his English clothes and spinning and wearing khadi. He traveled around the country in third-class railway carriages, staying in simple dharamsalas and ashrams, sleeping on the ground and walking miles preaching non-violent disobedience against the British Indian government. He continued this new lifestyle well past the age of seventy, including several years in British jails. In 1928, he supported Sardar Vallabhbhai Patel in the Bardoli Satyagraha, which included a boycott of British cloth and goods. Tyabji's daughter, Sohaila, remembered loading a bullock cart with the family's foreign garments, onto which were loaded all her mother's "best Irish linen, bedspreads, table covers... ", her father's "angarkha, chowghas and English suits" and Sohaila's own "favourite caps of silk and velvet", all given to be burnt.

=== Salt satyagraha ===
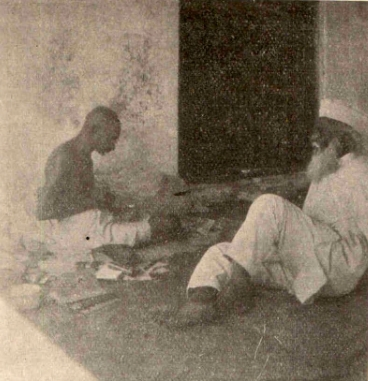

In early 1930, the Indian National Congress declared Purna Swaraj, or independence from the British Raj. As their first act of civil disobedience, or satyagraha, Mahatma Gandhi chose a nationwide non-violent protest against the British salt tax. Congress officials were convinced that Gandhi would quickly be arrested, and chose Tyabji as Gandhi's immediate successor to lead the Salt Satyagraha in case of Gandhi's arrest. On 4 May 1930, after the Salt March to Dandi, Gandhi was arrested and Tyabji placed in charge of the next phase of the Salt Satyagraha, a raid on the Dharasana Salt Works in Gujarat.

On 7 May 1930 Tyabji launched the Dharasana Satyagraha, addressing a meeting of the satyagrahis, and beginning the march with Gandhi's wife Kasturba at his side. An eyewitness remarked "It was a most solemn spectacle to see this Grand Old Man with his flowing snow-white beard marching at the head of the column and keeping pace in spite of his three score and sixteen years." On 12 May, before reaching Dharasana, Tyabji and 58 satyagrahis were arrested by the British. At that point, Sarojini Naidu was appointed to lead the Dharasana Satyagraha, which ended with the beating of hundreds of satyagrahis, an event that attracted worldwide attention to India's independence movement.

Mahatma Gandhi appointed Tyabji, at age seventy-six, to replace him as leader of the Salt Satyagraha in May 1930 after Gandhi's arrest. Tyabji was arrested soon afterward and imprisoned by the British Indian Government. Gandhi and others respectfully called Tyabji the "Grand Old Man of Gujarat".

== Death ==
Abbas Tyabji died in Mussoorie, (now in Uttarakhand) on 9 June 1936. After his death, Gandhi wrote an article in the Harijan newspaper titled "G. O. M. of Gujarat" (Grand Old Man of Gujarat), including the following praise for Tyabji:

At his age and for one who had never known hardships of life it was no joke to suffer imprisonments. But his faith conquered every obstacle... He was a rare servant of humanity. He was a servant of India because he was a servant of humanity. He believed in God as Daridranarayana. He believed that God was to be found in the humblest cottages and among the depressed of the earth. Abbas Mian is not dead, though his body rests in the grave. His life is an inspiration for us all.
