= Convention on Consent to Marriage, Minimum Age for Marriage and Registration of Marriages =

1962 United Nations treaty

Convention on Consent to Marriage, Minimum Age for Marriage, and Registration of Marriages
- Drafted: 7 November 1962
- Effective: 9 December 1964
- Condition: 90 days after the 8th ratification
- Signatories: 16
- Parties: 55
- Languages: English, French, Chinese, Russian, Spanish

Full text
- Convention on Consent to Marriage, Minimum Age for Marriage, and Registration of Marriages at Wikisource

The Convention on Consent to Marriage, Minimum Age for Marriage, and Registration of Marriages is a treaty agreed upon in the United Nations on the standards of marriage. The treaty was drafted by the Commission on the Status of Women and opened for signature and ratification by General Assembly resolution 1763 A (XVII) on 7 November 1962. It was entered into force 9 December 1964 by exchange of letters, in accordance with article 6. The convention has been signed by 16 countries and there are 55 parties to the convention. The convention is based on article 16 of the Universal Declaration of Human Rights. The Convention reaffirms the consensual nature of marriages and requires the parties to establish a minimum marriage age by law and to ensure the registration of marriages.

== History ==
The idea for the convention first developed during the Supplementary Convention on the Abolition of Slavery, the Slave Trade, and Institutions and Practices Similar to Slavery adopted by a Conference of Plenipotentiaries in 1956. This 1956 convention included articles which asserted that underage and forced marriage was a form of slavery. Within article 1 of the convention, certain types of marriage were classified as slavery. The convention stated that institutions or practices that included forced marriage for payment, the transfer of a woman from her marriage/marriage family to transfer her for value, the transfer of a woman upon the death of the husband.

In 1957, the Commission on the Status of Women requested the Economic and Social Council to work on the convention. The draft articles, comments, and revised text were requested by the Commission in its twelfth session in 1958. The Commission on the Status of Women requested the Secretary-General to draft a convention and a recommendation on this issues.

== Summary of Articles ==
Article 1: Marriages should be entered into with the "full and free consent" of both parties.

Article 2: States participating in the convention shall set laws for the minimum age of marriage.

Article 3: Marriages should be registered by the relevant authority.

Article 4: The convention was open for signature until 31 December 1963 and is subject to ratification.

Article 5: The convention is open for accession for all states referred to in Article 4.

Article 6: This article details the date of accession for all states that are part of the Convention

Article 7: This articles outlines the process of denunciation of the Convention

Article 8: Disputes regarding interpretation or application should be referred to the International Court of Justice.

Article 9: The Secretary-General shall notify relevant parties of signatures, instruments, date that the Convention enters into force, notifications of denunciation, and abrogation.

Article 10: The convention is published in several languages and is deposited in the archives of the United Nations. The Secretary-General shall transmit a copy to relevant parties.

== List of signatories and parties ==
| Participant | Signature | Ratification, accession, succession |
|---|---|---|
| Antigua and Barbuda | | 25 Oct 1988 |
| Argentina | | 26 Feb 1970 |
| Austria | | 1 Oct 1969 |
| Azerbaijan | | 16 Aug 1996 |
| Bangladesh | | 5 Oct 1998 |
| Barbados | | 1 Oct 1979 |
| Benin | | 19 Oct 1965 |
| Bosnia and Herzegovina | | 1 Sep 1993 |
| Brazil | | 11 Feb 1970 |
| Burkina Faso | | 8 Dec 1964 |
| Chile | 10 Dec 1962 | |
| Côte d'Ivoire | | 18 Dec 1995 |
| Croatia | | 12 Oct 1992 |
| Canada | | 23 Mar 1991 |
| Cuba | 17 Oct 1963 | 20 Aug 1965 |
| Cyprus | | 30 Jul 2002 |
| Czech Republic | | 22 Feb 1993 |
| Denmark | 31 Oct 1963 | 8 Sep 1964 |
| Dominican Republic | | 8 Oct 1964 |
| Fiji | | 19 Jul 1971 |
| Finland | | 18 Aug 1964 |
| France | 10 Dec 1962 | 14 Oct 2010 |
| Germany | | 9 Jul 1969 |
| Greece | 3 Jan 1963 | |
| Guatemala | | 18 Jan 1983 |
| Guinea | 10 Dec 1962 | 24 Jan 1978 |
| Hungary | | 5 Nov 1975 |
| Iceland | | 18 Oct 1977 |
| Israel | 10 Dec 1962 | |
| Italy | 20 Dec 1963 | |
| Jordan | | 1 Jul 1992 |
| Kyrgyzstan | | 10 Feb 1997 |
| Liberia | | 16 Sep 2005 |
| Libya | | 6 Sep 2005 |
| Macedonia | | 18 Jan 1994 |
| Mali | | 19 Aug 1964 |
| Mexico | | 22 Feb 1983 |
| Mongolia | | 6 Jun 1991 |
| Montenegro | | 23 Oct 2006 |
| Netherlands | 10 Dec 1962 | 2 Jul 1965 |
| New Zealand | 23 Dec 1963 | 12 Jun 1964 |
| Niger | | 1 Dec 1964 |
| Norway | | 10 Sep 1964 |
| Philippines | 5 Feb 1963 | 21 Jan 1965 |
| Poland | 17 Dec 1962 | 8 Jan 1965 |
| Romania | 27 Dec 1963 | 21 Jan 1993 |
| Rwanda | | 26 Sep 2003 |
| Samoa | | 24 Aug 1964 |
| Serbia | | 12 Mar 2001 |
| Slovakia | | 28 May 1993 |
| South Africa | | 29 Jan 1993 |
| Spain | | 15 Apr 1969 |
| Sri Lanka | 12 Dec 1962 | |
| St. Vincent and the Grenadines | | 27 Apr 1999 |
| Sweden | 10 Dec 1962 | 16 Jun 1964 |
| Trinidad and Tobago | | 2 Oct 1969 |
| Tunisia | | 24 Jan 1968 |
| United Kingdom | | 9 Jul 1970 |
| United States | 10 Dec 1962 | |
| Venezuela | | 31 May 1983 |
| Yemen | | 9 Feb 1987 |
| Yugoslavia | 10 Dec 1962 | 19 June 1964 |
| Zimbabwe | | 23 Nov 1994 |

== Status of child marriage ==
Despite the development of this convention, child marriage and forced marriage are still an issue worldwide. More than 12 million girls were forced into marriage in 2020.

On December 10, 2019, then Philippine president Rodrigo R. Duterte signed into law Republic Act 11596 or the "An Act Prohibiting the Practice of Child Marriage and Imposing Penalties for Violations Thereof" thereby criminalizing the practice of child marriage in the Philippines. The law was enacted in compliance with the Philippine obligation under the convention. The law prohibits marriage between a child and a child or between an adult and a child. This is whether in informal union or cohabitation outside of wedlock between an adult and a child, or between children. The law intends to abolish all traditional and cultural practices and structures that perpetuate discrimination, abuse. However, while the law also declared child betrothal as has no legal effect it does not provide any penalty thereof.

== See also ==
- Universal Declaration of Human Rights
- Human trafficking
- United Nations Commission on the Status of Women
- Age of Marriage Act 1929
