= 1929 French Championships – Men's doubles =

Men's doubles
- 1929 French Championships

Final
- Champion: (France) René Lacoste (France) Jean Borotra
- Runner-up: (France) Henri Cochet (France) Jacques Brugnon
- Score: 6–3, 3–6, 6–3, 3–6, 8–6

Events
Singles	men	women
Doubles	men	women
← 1928 ·	French Championships	· 1930 →

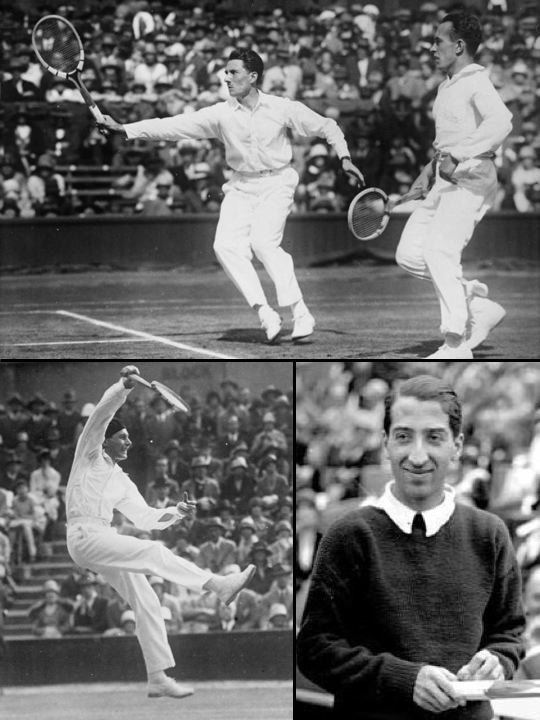
Jacques Brugnon, Henri Cochet (up), the runner-up for the event; Jean Borotra (down-left) and René Lacoste (down-right) the triumphant doubles players

Jean Borotra and Jacques Brugnon were the defending champions but they split up and Borotra teamed up with René Lacoste and Brugnon partnered with Henri Cochet. The final saw the encounter of these teams known all together as the Four Musketeers with the former pair clinching the title.

== Seeds ==
Every but 16 teams (neither the third and four seeds) received a bye into the second round.

1. (United States) Bill Tilden / (United States) Frank Hunter (semifinal)
2. (France) Henri Cochet / (France) Jacques Brugnon (final)
3. (Italy) Leonardo Bonzi / (Italy) Clemente Serventi (second round)
4. (France) André Roche / (France) Pierre Joba (second round)
5. (France) René Lacoste / (France) Jean Borotra (champions)
6. (Czechoslovakia) Roderich Menzel / (Czechoslovakia) Josef Malacek(third round)
7. (France) Emmanuel du Plaix / (France) Raymond Rodel (third round)
8. (France) René de Buzelet / (France) Christian Boussus (Quarterfinal)

== Draw ==
=== Key ===
- Q = Qualifier
- WC = Wild card
- LL = Lucky loser
- Alt = Alternate
- ITF = ITF entry
- PR = Protected ranking
- SR = Special ranking
- SE = Special exempt
- JE = Junior exempt
- JR = Junior Accelerator Programme entrant
- CO = College Accelerator Programme entrant
- NG = Next Gen Accelerator Program entrant
- w/o = Walkover
- r = Retired
- d = Defaulted

=== Finals ===
Quarterfinals
1	(United States) Tilden (United States) Hunter	3	6	6	6
(Hungary) Kehrling (Weimar Republic) Kleinschroth	6	3	1	4
5	(France) Lacoste (France) Borotra	2	6	1	6	6
(Italy) De Morpurgo (Italy) del Bono	6	2	6	4	3
(United Kingdom) Gregory (United Kingdom) Collins	6	2	6	6
8	(France) de Buzelet (France) Boussus	3	6	2	3
(Netherlands) Timmer (Austria) O. von Salm-Hoogstraeten	2	2	7
2	(France) Cochet (France) Brugnon	6	6	9

Semifinals
1	(United States) Tilden (United States) Hunter	3	2	6	3
5	(France) Lacoste (France) Borotra	6	6	3	6
(United Kingdom) Gregory (United Kingdom) Collins	3	4	3
2	(France) Cochet (France) Brugnon	6	6	6

Final
5	(France) Lacoste (France) Borotra	6	3	6	3	8
2	(France) Cochet (France) Brugnon	3	6	3	6	6

=== Top half ===
==== Section 1 ====
First round

Second round
1	(United States) Tilden (United States) Hunter	6	6	6
(Denmark) Rasmussen (Norway) Nielsen	0	1	0
(France) É Borotra (United States) Coen	6	11	8
(Egypt) Zahar (Egypt) Danon	2	9	6
(Hungary) Kehrling (Weimar Republic) Kleinschroth	w/o
(Greece) Zerlendis (Greece) Zafiropoulo
(United Kingdom) Olliff (United Kingdom) Austin	8	7	7	3	2
7	(France) du Plaix (France) Rodel	10	5	5	6	6

Third round
1	(United States) Tilden (United States) Hunter	6	4	6	6
(France) É Borotra (United States) Coen	1	6	2	2
(Hungary) Kehrling (Weimar Republic) Kleinschroth	2	6	9	6	6
7	(France) du Plaix (France) Rodel	6	1	11	2	4

Quarterfinals
1	(United States) Tilden (United States) Hunter	3	6	6	6
(Hungary) Kehrling (Weimar Republic) Kleinschroth	6	3	1	4

==== Section 2 ====
First round
(Italy) Umberto De Morpurgo (Italy) Alberto del Bono	6	6	6
Edmond-Blanc (France) Nicolas Magaloff	3	2	4
(France) Henri Reynaud (France) Denis Laurent	6	6	6
(Switzerland) Charles Aeschlimann (Switzerland) Ernst	2	1	3
7	(Chile) Domingo Torralva-Ponsa (Chile) Luis Torralva-Ponsa	3	6	7	7
(France) Jean Augustin (France) François Terrier	6	4	5	5
(United Kingdom) Arthur Wallis Myers; Hunt	2	2	6	7	1
4	(France) André Roche (France) Pierre Joba	6	6	1	5	6

Second round
5	(France) Lacoste (France) Borotra	6	6	6
(British Raj) Fyzee (Romania) Misu	0	3	2
(Weimar Republic) Moldenhauer (Weimar Republic) Prenn	4	6	6	4	6
(France) Benny Berthet (France) Jean Lesueur	6	3	3	6	1
(Italy) De Morpurgo (Italy) del Bono	6	6	6
(France) Reynaud (France) Laurent	3	4	1
(Chile) D Torralva-Ponsa (Chile) L Torralva-Ponsa	4	2	7	7	6
4	(France) Roche (France) Joba	6	6	5	5	1

Third round
5	(France) Lacoste (France) Borotra	2	7	5	6	6
(Weimar Republic) Moldenhauer (Weimar Republic) Prenn	6	5	7	2	2
(Italy) De Morpurgo (Italy) del Bono	6	5	6	6
(Chile) D Torralva-Ponsa (Chile) L Torralva-Ponsa	3	7	2	3

Quarterfinals
5	(France) Lacoste (France) Borotra	2	6	1	6	6
(Italy) De Morpurgo (Italy) del Bono	6	2	6	4	3

=== Bottom half ===
==== Section 3 ====
First round
3	(Italy) Leonardo Bonzi (Italy) Clemente Serventi	6	8	6
(United States) E. Goldschmidt (United States) J. Converse	1	6	3
(France) Georges Glasser (France) André Martin-Legeay	1	4	2
(United Kingdom) Colin Gregory (United Kingdom) Ian Collins	6	6	6
(United States) A.G. Rawlins (United States) Homer Levinson	7	2	3	4
(France) Paul Féret (France) Marcel Cousin	5	6	6	6
(France) Jean Pastré (France) Jacques Deniau	0	4	3
(Monaco) René Gallepe (France) Léonce Aslangul	6	6	6

Second round
3	(Italy) Bonzi (Italy) Serventi	2	5	13
(United Kingdom) Gregory (United Kingdom) Collins	6	7	15
(France) Féret (France) Cousin	2	2	6	6	3
(Monaco) Gallepe (France) Aslangul	6	6	2	1	6
(South Africa) Robbins (Austria) Salm-Hoogstraeten
(France) Danet (France) George	w/o
(Weimar Republic) Fuchs (Weimar Republic) Wetzel	4	1	2
8	(France) de Buzelet (France) Boussus	6	6	6

Third round
(United Kingdom) Gregory (United Kingdom) Collins	6	6	0	6
(Monaco) Gallepe (France) Aslangul	1	2	6	2
(France) Danet (France) George	5	1	4
8	(France) de Buzelet (France) Boussus	7	6	6

Quarterfinals
(United Kingdom) Gregory (United Kingdom) Collins	6	2	6	6
8	(France) de Buzelet (France) Boussus	3	6	2	3

==== Section 4 ====
First round

Second round
6	(Czechoslovakia) Menzel (Czechoslovakia) Malaček	6	6	6
(France) Thurneyssen (France) Gentien	1	2	1
(Belgium) de Borman (Belgium) Toussaint
(Netherlands) Timmer (Austria) O. von Salm-Hoogstraeten	w/o
(Monaco) Landau (France) Broquedis	4	4	1
(Egypt) Grandguillot (United States) Covington	6	6	6
(Austria) Matejka (Austria) Artens	4	4	4
2	(France) Cochet (France) Brugnon	6	6	6

Third round
6	(Czechoslovakia) Menzel (Czechoslovakia) Malacek	4	3	3
(Netherlands) Timmer (Austria) O. von Salm-Hoogstraeten	6	6	6
(Egypt) Grandguillot (United States) Covington	2	4	4
2	(France) Cochet (France) Brugnon	6	6	6

Quarterfinals
(Netherlands) Timmer (Austria) O. von Salm-Hoogstraeten	2	2	7
2	(France) Cochet (France) Brugnon	6	6	9

== Sources ==
Béla Kehrling, ed. (10 June 1929). "A férfi páros mezőnye [The doubles draw]" (in Hungarian) (pdf). Tennisz és Golf. I (Budapest, Hungary: Bethlen Gábor Irod. és Nyomdai RT) 3: 67. Retrieved September 22, 2012.
