= River Plate Championships =

Defunct tennis tournament
- Tour: ILTF Circuit
- Founded: 1893; 133 years ago
- Abolished: 1979; 47 years ago
- Location: Buenos Aires, Argentina
- Venue: Buenos Aires Lawn Tennis Club
- Surface: Clay / outdoor

The River Plate Championships or Campeonatos del Río de la Plata, formally named River Plate International Tennis Championships, were five combined men's and women's tournaments.

The men's single was founded in 1893 as the Buenos Aires Lawn Tennis Club Open and in 1894 it was played for the first time with cash.

Annually held on the outdoor clay courts of the Buenos Aires Lawn Tennis Club, Buenos Aires, Argentina, the championships officially ran until 1978. From 1979 to 2016, the competitions ceased to be events on the international tennis circuits and were abolished in 2017.

== History ==
The River Plate Championships were the most important international tennis tournaments to be held in Argentina and Latin America, preceding the Argentina International Championships by 34 years in men's competitions and by 25 years in women's competitions.

In 1893 the Buenos Aires Lawn Tennis Club organized its first tournament for members of all clubs within the Río de la Plata area, but it was played by local players. The event consisted only of the championship match and it was won by the Argentine player Frank Murray Still, who beat fellow Argentine player Thomas Vesey Melville Knox. The last champion was Argentina's José Luis Clerc, who beat New Zealand's Chris Lewis in the 1978 finale.

The women's championship did not start until 1903. It was won by the Argentine player Miss Chawner, who defeated fellow Argentine player Winnifred M. Boadle. The last champion was the American player Caroline Stoll, who beat Argentina's Emilse Raponi de Longo in the 1978 finale.

== Finals ==
=== Men's singles ===
Year	Champion	Runner-up	Score
1893	(Argentina) Frank Murray Still	(Argentina) Thomas Knox	
1894	(Argentina) Thomas Knox	(Argentina) Frank Murray Still	3–6, 6–4, 6–1
1895	(Argentina) Thomas Knox (2)	(Argentina) B. St. Vershoyle	7–5, 2–6, 6–3
1896	(Argentina) Thomas Knox (3)	(Argentina) Richard Handcock	7–5, 6–3
1897	(Argentina) Thomas Knox (4)	(Argentina) Henry BM Knight	6–3, 4–6, 6–4, 6–1
1898	(Argentina) Henry BM Knight	(Argentina) Thomas Knox	6–2, 6–3, 6–2
1899	(Argentina) AJ McMorran	(Argentina) Henry BM Knight	6–4, 7–5, 10–8
1900	(Argentina) Stanley Knight	(Argentina) AJ McMorran	6–1, 6–3, 6–2
1901	(Argentina) Stanley Knight (2)	(Argentina) AJ McMorran	6–4, 2–6, 6–1, 6–4
1902	(Argentina) Stanley Knight (3)	(Argentina) AJ McMorran	6–4, 3–6, 6–2, 8–6
1903	(Argentina) Stanley Knight (4)	(Argentina) AJ McMorran	6–1, 6–2, 6–4
1904	(Argentina) Stanley Knight (5)	(Argentina) AJ McMorran	0–6, 2–6, 6–4, 6–2, 6–3
1905	(Argentina) Stanley Knight (6)	(Argentina) HW Thompson	6–3, 6–4, 6–4
1906	(Argentina) Stanley Knight (7)	(Argentina) Lionel H. Knight	4–6, 6–2, 6–4, 6–4
1907	(Argentina) Stanley Knight (8)	(Argentina) AJ McMorran	6–3, 6–0, 6–2
1908	(Argentina) Stanley Knight (9)	(Argentina) Henry BM Knight	4–6, 6–4, 7–5, 6–3
1909	(Argentina) J. Easton	(Argentina) HW Thompson	7–5, 6–2, 8–6
1910	(Argentina) Stanley Knight (10)	(Argentina) Lionel Knight	6–1, 8–6, 6–3
1911	(Argentina) Stanley Knight (11)	(Argentina) Lionel Knight	6–1, 6–4, 3–6, 6–1
1912	(Argentina) Diego E. Cerboni	(Argentina) Edward Oswald Jacobs	6–2, 6–2, 7–5
1913	(Argentina) Lionel Knight	(Argentina) RO Sheward	6–4, 6–0, 6–1
1914	(Argentina) Henry B. Knight	(Argentina) JJ Daly	2–6, 6–2, 5–7, 7–5, 6–3
1915	(Argentina) Lionel Knight (2)	(Argentina) Alfredo Villegas	1–6, 5–7, 6–3, 6–4, 6–4
1916	(Argentina) Lionel Knight (3)	(Argentina) Alfredo Villegas	6–3, 7–5, 4–3, ret.
1917	(Argentina) Lionel Knight (4)	(Argentina) Carlos Morea	6–0, 3–6, 6–4, 6–3
1918	(Argentina) Lionel Knight (5)	(Argentina) Arturo Hortal	6–4, 6–2, 6–3
1919	(Argentina) Lionel Knight (6)	(Argentina) Arturo Hortal	6–2, 6–4, 2–6, 6–2
1920	(Argentina) Lionel Knight (7)	(Argentina) Arturo Hortal	6–0, 2–6, 6–0, 7–5
1921	(Argentina) Lionel Knight (8)	(Argentina) Carlos Dumas	6–2, 4–6, 9–7, 6–4
1922	(Argentina) Lionel Knight (9)	(Argentina) Arturo Hortal	w.o.
1923	(Argentina) Lionel Knight (10)	(Argentina) Carlos Dumas	6–0, 3–6, 7–5, 6–2
1924	(Argentina) Guillermo Robson	(Argentina) Carlos Morea	6–4, 7–5, 6–4
1925	(Argentina) Guillermo Robson (2)	(Argentina) Enrique Obarrio	6–1, 6–2, 6–2
1926	(Argentina) Carlos Morea	(Uruguay) Bernardo Ferrés	6–4, 6–4, 6–2
1927	(Argentina) Ronaldo Boyd	(Argentina) Héctor Cattaruzza	7–5, 6–4, 7–9, 6–2
1928	(Spain) Manuel Alonso Areizaga	(Argentina) Ricardo López Pelliza	6–1, 6–4, 6–1
1929	(Argentina) Ronaldo Boyd (2)	(Argentina) Guillermo Robson	6–4, 3–6, 9–7, 6–4
1930	(Argentina) Lucilo del Castillo	(Argentina) Ronaldo Boyd	4–6, 10–8, 6–4, 6–2
1931	(Argentina) Carlos Morea (2)	(Argentina) Ricardo López Pelliza	6–3, 6–3, 6–2
1932	(Argentina) Guillermo Robson (3)	(Argentina) Adriano Zappa	6–1, 7–9, 6–3, 5–7, 8–6
1933	(Argentina) Lucilo del Castillo (2)	(Argentina) Adriano Zappa	6–4, 5–7, 14–12, 6–1
1934	(Argentina) Hector Cattaruzza	(Argentina) Adriano Zappa	7–5, 5–7, 3–6, 6–0, 6–3
1935	(Argentina) Lucilo del Castillo (3)	(Argentina) Adelmar Echeverría	6–2, 6–4, 6–1
1936	(Argentina) Héctor Cattaruzza (2)	(Argentina) Eric Seaton	6–3, 6–2, 6–0
1937	(Brazil) Alcides Procopio	(Argentina) Hector Cattaruzza	w.o.
1938	(Argentina) Lucilo del Castillo (4)	(Argentina) Adriano Zappa	9–7, 6–3, 14–12
1939	(Ecuador) Pancho Segura	(Argentina) Lucilo del Castillo	2–6, 6–3, 11–9, 6–2
1940	(Brazil) Alcides Procopio	(Chile) Efraín González	6–4, 6–2, 4–6, 7–5
1941	(Brazil) Manoel Fernandes	(Argentina) Heraldo Weiss	2–6, 6–3, 6–3, 6–2
1942	(Argentina) Alejo Russell	(Brazil) Manoel Fernandes	1–6, 6–2, 6–4, 6–2
1943	(United States) Don McNeill	(Argentina) Alejo Russell	6–2, 6–0, 6–3
1944	(Argentina) Heraldo Weiss	(Argentina) Héctor Cattaruzza	11–9, 6–2, 8–6
1945	(Argentina) Heraldo Weiss (2)	(Argentina) Enrique Morea	6–2, 6–1, 6–3
1946	(Argentina) Enrique Morea	(Chile) Andrés Hammersley	6–3, 2–6, 9–7, 6–4
1947	(Argentina) Enrique Morea (2)	(United States) Bill Talbert	3–6, 9–7, 6–4, 6–4
1948	(United States) Seymour Greenberg	(Argentina) Enrique Morea	1–6, 2–6, 6–3, 6–4, 6–1
1949	(United States) Earl Cochell	(Argentina) Enrique Morea	2–6, 6–4, 2–6, 7–5, 7–5
1950	(Argentina) Enrique Morea (3)	(Brazil) Armando Vieira	6–4, 4–6, 6–1, 6–2
1951	(Argentina) Salvador Soriano	(Peru) Noé La Jara	4–6, 6–8, 9–7, 6–3, 6–2
1952	(Argentina) Eduardo Prado	(Peru) Noé La Jara	6–0, 6–2, 6–3
1953	(Argentina) Ernesto Della Paolera	(Argentina) Perfecto Suárez	3–6, 8–6, 6–0, 6–1
1954	(Argentina) Eduardo Prado (2)	(Argentina) Oscar González Bonorino	6–1, 6–3, 6–1
1955	(Argentina) Salvador Soriano	(Argentina) Eduardo Prado	6–4, 4–6, 6–0, 6–3
1956	(Argentina) Enrique Morea (4)	(Argentina) Eduardo Prado	10–8, 6–3, 6–4
1957	(Argentina) Enrique Morea (5)	(Argentina) Eduardo Soriano	6–4, 10–8, 6–4
1958	(Argentina) Ernesto Ríos	(Argentina) Eduardo Soriano	7–5, 5–7, 6–4, 6–4
1959	(Argentina) Enrique Morea (6)	(Argentina) Eduardo Prado	6–4, 6–4, 7–5
1960	(Argentina) Eduardo Prado (3)	(Argentina) Enrique Morea	3–6, 9–7, 6–4, 13–11
1961	(Argentina) Eduardo Prado (4)	(Argentina) Roberto Aubone	6–3, 6–4, 8–7, ret.
1962	(Argentina) Enrique Morea (7)	(Argentina) Roberto Aubone	6–1, 3–6, 6–3, 6–2
1963	(Argentina) Enrique Morea (8)	(Argentina) Roberto Aubone	6–1, 6–3, 6–3
1964	(Australia) Roy Emerson	(Mexico) Rafael Osuna	3–6, 6–4, 6–4
1965	(Australia) Fred Stolle	(Australia) Roy Emerson	6–4, 7–5
1966	(Australia) Martin Mulligan	(Mexico) Rafael Osuna	6–2, 7–5, 6–3
1967	(United States) Cliff Richey	(United States) Clark Graebner	3–6, 6–4, 7–5
Open era
1968	(Argentina) Julián Ganzabal	(Argentina) José Prats	w.o.
1969	(Argentina) Julián Ganzabal (2)	(Argentina) Norberto Herrero	6–2, 6–1, 6–4
1970	(Brazil) José Edison Mandarino	(West Germany) Harald Elschenbroich	5–7, 7–5, 9–7, 6–2
1971	(Chile) Jaime Fillol	(Argentina) Julián Ganzábal	6–4, 6–3, 6–3
1972	(Argentina) Guillermo Vilas	(Argentina) Héctor Romani	6–3, 6–1, 6–2
1973	(Argentina) Julián Ganzábal (3)	(Argentina) Ricardo Cano	7–6, 2–6, 3–6, 6–2, 6–2
1974	(Argentina) Guillermo Vilas (2)	(Argentina) Julián Ganzábal	7–6, 4–6, 6–3, 6–3
1975	(Argentina) Guillermo Vilas (3)	(United States) Clark Graebner	6–3, 6–1, 6–4
1976	(Argentina) Julián Ganzábal (4)	(Argentina) Lorenzo Soriano	7–5, 6–3
1977	(Argentina) Guillermo Vilas (4)	(Poland) Wojtek Fibak	6–4, 6–3, 6–0
1978	(Argentina) José Luis Clerc	(New Zealand) Chris Lewis	6–3, 6–1
