= Tennis at the 1924 Summer Olympics – Men's singles =

Men's singles at the Games of the VIII Olympiad
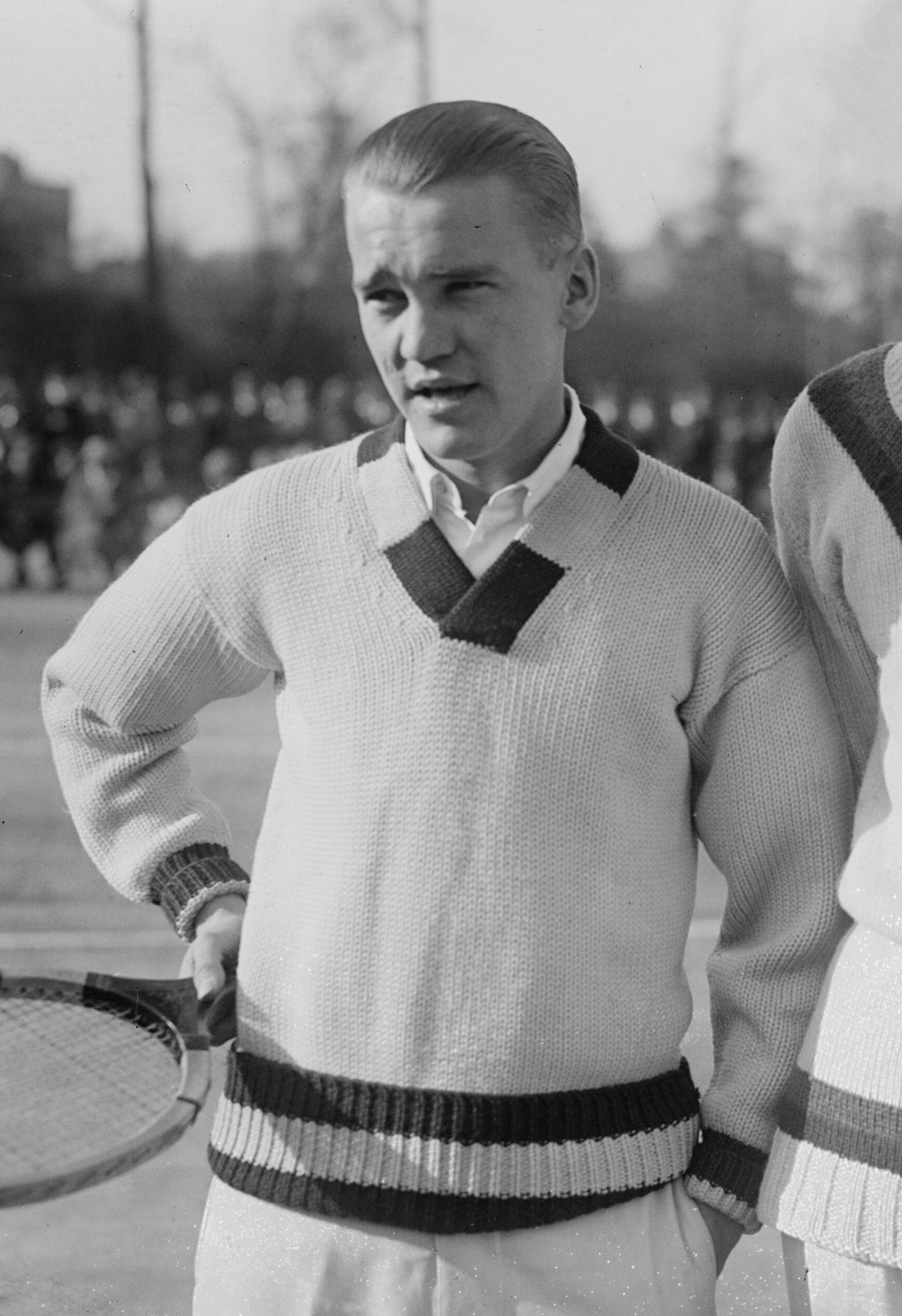
- Vincent Richards (1922)
- Venue: Stade de Colombes
- Dates: 13–20 July 1922
- Competitors: 82 from 27 nations

Medalists
1st place, gold medalist(s)		Vincent Richards	United States
2nd place, silver medalist(s)		Henri Cochet	France
3rd place, bronze medalist(s)		Uberto De Morpurgo	Italy

Men's singles
- Tennis at the 1924 Summer Olympics

Events
Singles	men	women
Doubles	men	women	mixed
- Summer Olympics

The men's singles tennis competition was one of five tennis events at the 1924 Summer Olympics. There were 82 competitors from 27 nations. Nations were limited to four players each, as they had been in 1920. The event was won by Vincent Richards of the United States, the nation's first victory in the event since 1904 and second overall (tied with South Africa for second-most all-time behind Great Britain's three wins). France and Italy each earned their first men's singles tennis medals, with Henri Cochet's silver and Uberto De Morpurgo's bronze, respectively.

== Background ==
This was the seventh appearance of the men's singles tennis event. The event has been held at every Summer Olympics where tennis has been on the program: from 1896 to 1924 and then from 1988 to the current program. Demonstration events were held in 1968 and 1984.

The field for this event was stronger than previous Olympic tournaments, but still had significant absences. The American greats Bill Tilden and Bill Johnston ("Big Bill" and "Little Bill") did not compete, but Vincent Richards was ranked world #2 in 1924 and the rest of the United States team (R. Norris Williams, Watson Washburn, and Francis Hunter) were all significant players. Three of France's Four Musketeers, who would rise to prominence later in the 1920s, competed. Defending champion Louis Raymond of South Africa returned.

Argentina, Chile, Finland, India, Ireland, Luxembourg, Mexico, Portugal, Romania, and Yugoslavia each made their debut in the event. France made its sixth appearance, most among all nations, having missed only the 1904 event.

== Competition format ==
The competition was a single-elimination tournament with a bronze-medal match. All matches were best-of-five sets.

== Schedule ==
Date	Time	Round
Sunday, 13 July 1924		Round of 128; Round of 64
Monday, 14 July 1924		Round of 64
Tuesday, 15 July 1924		Round of 32
Wednesday, 16 July 1924		Round of 16
Thursday, 17 July 1924		Quarterfinals
Friday, 18 July 1924		Semifinals
Sunday, 20 July 1924		Bronze medal match Final

== Draw ==
Key

- Q = Qualifier
- WC = Wild card
- LL = Lucky loser
- Alt = Alternate
- ITF = ITF entry
- PR = Protected ranking
- SR = Special ranking
- SE = Special exempt
- JE = Junior exempt
- JR = Junior Accelerator Programme entrant
- CO = College Accelerator Programme entrant
- NG = Next Gen Accelerator Program entrant
- w/o = Walkover
- r = Retired
- d = Defaulted

=== Finals ===
Quarterfinals
R. Norris Williams (USA)	7	3	2	4
Henri Cochet (FRA)	5	6	6	6
Jean Borotra (FRA)	4	6	7	6
Sydney Jacob (IND)	6	4	5	3
Uberto de Morpurgo (ITA)	6	6	6
Takeichi Harada (JPN)	4	1	1
René Lacoste (FRA)	6	6	6	2	3
Vincent Richards (USA)	8	4	1	6	6

Semifinals
Henri Cochet (FRA)	6	5	6	6
Jean Borotra (FRA)	2	7	2	3
Uberto de Morpurgo (ITA)	3	6	1	4
Vincent Richards (USA)	6	3	6	6

Final (gold-medal match)
Henri Cochet (FRA)	4	4	7	6	2
Vincent Richards (USA)	6	6	5	4	6
Bronze-medal match
Jean Borotra (FRA)	6	1	6	6	5
Uberto de Morpurgo (ITA)	1	6	8	4	7

=== Top half ===
==== Section 1 ====
First round

Second round
A Lammens (BEL)	0	1	0
P Macenauer (TCH)	6	6	6
SM Hadi (IND)	0	2	1
RN Williams (USA)	6	6	6
B von Kehrling (HUN)	6	6	6
A Roman (ROU)	1	1	2
C Aeschlimann (SUI)	7	6	6
C Dumas (ARG)	5	4	0

Third round
P Macenauer (TCH)	2	6	6	2	1
RN Williams (USA)	6	4	3	6	6
B von Kehrling (HUN)	4	6	7	6	6
C Aeschlimann (SUI)	6	8	5	2	3

Fourth round
RN Williams (USA)	6	3	6	4	6
B von Kehrling (HUN)	4	6	3	6	3

==== Section 2 ====
First round

Second round
H Timmer (NED)	6	2	1	6	6
E Ulrich (DEN)	3	6	6	2	3
M Fukuda (JPN)	6	6	6
P Wheatley (GBR)	2	4	3
I Richardson (RSA)	6	6	6
F Sindreu (ESP)	4	4	3
C Colombo (ITA)	w/o
H Cochet (FRA)

Third round
H Timmer (NED)	6	4	7	4
M Fukuda (JPN)	8	6	5	6
I Richardson (RSA)	3	4	4
Henri Cochet (FRA)	6	6	6

Fourth round
M Fukuda (JPN)	2	1	3
H Cochet (FRA)	6	6	6

==== Section 3 ====
First round
WL Wei (ROC)	w/o
H Müller (SWE)
A Kingscote (GBR)	6	6	4	3	6
F Rohrer (TCH)	3	4	6	6	3
A Honda (JPN)	3	3	5
J Borotra (FRA)	6	6	7
A Casanovas (POR)	w/o
L Torralva (CHI)
I Balás (YUG)	w/o
J Nielsen (NOR)
E Tegner (DEN)	6	6	6
A von Kelemen (HUN)	4	1	1

Second round
R Granholm (FIN)
N Brookes (AUS)	w/o
H Müller (SWE)	2	5	2
A Kingscote (GBR)	6	7	6
J Borotra (FRA)	9	7	7
L Torralva (CHI)	7	5	5
J Nielsen (NOR)	5	6	6	9
E Tegner (DEN)	7	4	4	7

Third round
R Granholm (FIN)	2	0	2
A Kingscote (GBR)	6	6	6
J Borotra (FRA)	6	6	6
J Nielsen (NOR)	0	1	2

Fourth round
A Kingscote (GBR)	1	3	1
J Borotra (FRA)	6	6	6

==== Section 4 ====
First round
E Schybergson (FIN)	4	3	3
M Ferrier (SUI)	6	6	6
S Jacob (IND)	6	6	6
R Morales (ESP)	2	4	4
S Halot (BEL)	6	6	6
W Ireland (IRL)	1	4	4
J Willard (AUS)	2	6	6	2	6
L Raymond (RSA)	6	4	4	6	4
S-C Wu (ROC)	w/o
C van Lennep (NED)
P Papadopoulos (GRE)	5	5	1
A Cattaruzza (ARG)	7	7	6
C Serventi (ITA)	4	3	4
W Washburn (USA)	6	6	6
F del Canto (MEX)	4	3	4
G Lupu (ROU)	6	6	6

Second round
M Ferrier (SUI)	7	3	1	1
S Jacob (IND)	5	6	6	6
S Halot (BEL)	6	2	2
J Willard (AUS)	8	6	6
C van Lennep (NED)	6	6	6
A Cattaruzza (ARG)	3	1	1
W Washburn (USA)	6	6	6
G Lupu (ROU)	2	3	4

Third round
S Jacob (IND)	6	6	3	2	6
J Willard (AUS)	1	2	6	6	3
C van Lennep (NED)	6	1	1	2
W Washburn (USA)	2	6	6	6

Fourth round
S Jacob (IND)	6	6	8	6
W Washburn (USA)	1	4	10	2

=== Bottom half ===
==== Section 5 ====
First round
A Hortal (ARG)	6	6	6
R de Castro Pereira (POR)	1	4	2
F Hunter (USA)	6	6	6
A Grahn (FIN)	3	0	2
E Flaquer (ESP)	6	3	6	6
D Torralva (CHI)	4	6	0	0
J Washer (BEL)	6	6	6
N Mișu (ROU)	3	4	2
A Zerlendis (GRE)
S-K Ng (ROC)	w/o
C Langaard (NOR)	2	2	3
A-A Fyzee (IND)	6	6	6
P Debran (SUI)	6	6	6
D McCrea (IRL)	4	4	0
C Wolff (LUX)	1	0	0
U de Morpurgo (ITA)	6	6	6

Second round
A Hortal (ARG)	3	3	1
F Hunter (USA)	6	6	6
E Flaquer (ESP)	1	4	5
J Washer (BEL)	6	6	7
A Zerlendis (GRE)	6	1	3	6	6
A-A Fyzee (IND)	3	6	6	3	4
P Debran (SUI)	2	3	3
U de Morpurgo (ITA)	6	6	6

Third round
F Hunter (USA)	6	6	2	1	4
J Washer (BEL)	2	1	6	6	6
A Zerlendis (GRE)	0	2	4
U de Morpurgo (ITA)	6	6	6

Fourth round
J Washer (BEL)	6	4	6	4	6
U de Morpurgo (ITA)	2	6	1	6	8

==== Section 6 ====
First round
G Leembruggen (NED)
H-H Khoo (ROC)	w/o
Đ Dunđerski (YUG)	6	1	6	2
B Gilbert (GBR)	8	6	2	6
J Bayley (AUS)	6	6	6
B Schildt (FIN)	1	3	4
E Bache (DEN)	2	8	9	6
M Lozano (MEX)	6	6	7	4
M Cousin (FRA)	4	6	6	6
J Condon (RSA)	6	3	2	4
K Kirchmayer (HUN)	6	2	4
C Wennergren (SWE)	8	6	6

Second round
G Leembruggen (NED)	1	10	1
B Gilbert (GBR)	6	12	6
J Bayley (AUS)	6	6	6
E Bache (DEN)	2	1	2
M Cousin (FRA)	6	6	6
C Wennergren (SWE)	4	3	2
T Harada (JPN)	6	3	6	6
L Žemla (TCH)	3	6	2	2

Third round
B Gilbert (GBR)	7	9	6
J Bayley (AUS)	5	7	1
M Cousin (FRA)	w/o
T Harada (JPN)

Fourth round
B Gilbert (GBR)	8	6	9	2
T Harada (JPN)	10	2	11	6

==== Section 7 ====
First round

Second round
R Lacoste (FRA)	6	6	6
L Göncz (HUN)	0	0	1
J Koželuh (TCH)	4	7	10	4	6
S Okamoto (JPN)	6	5	8	6	4
P Spence (RSA)	6	6	7
H Syz (SUI)	3	2	5
B Thalbitzer (DEN)	1	1	2
M Woosnam (GBR)	6	6	6

Third round
R Lacoste (FRA)	6	6	6
J Koželuh (TCH)	1	2	1
P Spence (RSA)	4	10	6	3	6
M Woosnam (GBR)	6	8	3	6	3

Fourth round
R Lacoste (FRA)	6	6	6
P Spence (RSA)	2	0	1

==== Section 8 ====
First round

Second round
M Sleem (IND)	6	6	6
M van der Feen (NED)	4	1	4
V de Laveleye (BEL)	2	4	0
V Richards (USA)	6	6	6
R Sabbadini (ITA)	w/o
M Alonso Areizaga (ESP)
G Robson (ARG)
M Stern (ROU)	w/o

Third round
M Sleem (IND)	6	6	4	6	2
V Richards (USA)	8	2	6	4	6
M Alonso Areizaga (ESP)	7	6	6	6
G Robson (ARG)	9	4	0	4

Fourth round
V Richards (USA)	7	10	2	6
M Alonso Areizaga (ESP)	5	8	6	3

== Results summary ==
Rank	Player	Nation	Round of 128	Round of 64	Round of 32	Round of 16	Quarterfinals	Semifinals	Final
1st place, gold medalist(s)	Vincent Richards	United States	Bye	V de Laveleye (BEL); W 6–2, 6–4, 6–0	M Sleem (IND); W 8–6, 2–6, 6–4, 4–6, 6–2	M Alonso Areizaga (ESP); W 7–5, 10–8, 2–6, 6–3	R Lacoste (FRA); W 8–6, 4–6, 1–6, 6–2, 6–3	U de Morpurgo (ITA); W 6–3, 3–6, 6–1, 6–4	H Cochet (FRA); W 6–4, 6–4, 5–7, 4–6, 6–2
2nd place, silver medalist(s)	Henri Cochet	France	Bye	C Colombo (ITA); W w/o	I Richardson (RSA); W 6–3, 6–4, 6–4	M Fukuda (JPN); W 6–2, 6–1, 6–3	RN Williams (USA); W 5–7, 6–3, 6–2, 6–4	J Borotra (FRA); W 6–2, 5–7, 6–2, 6–3	V Richards (USA); L 6–4, 6–4, 5–7, 4–6, 6–2
3rd place, bronze medalist(s)	Uberto De Morpurgo	Italy	C Wolff (LUX); W 6–1, 6–0, 6–0	P Debran (SUI); W 6–2, 6–3, 6–3	A Zerlendis (GRE); W 6–0, 6–2, 6–4	J Washer (BEL); W 2–6, 6–4, 1–6, 6–4, 8–6	T Harada (JPN); W 6–4, 6–1, 6–1	V Richards (USA); L 6–3, 3–6, 6–1, 6–4	J Borotra (FRA); W 1–6, 6–1, 8–6, 4–6, 7–5
4	Jean Borotra	France	A Honda (JPN); W 6–3, 6–3, 7–5	L Torralva (CHI); W 9–7, 7–5, 7–5	J Nielsen (NOR); W 6–0, 6–1, 6–2	A Kingscote (GBR); W 6–1, 6–3, 6–1	S Jacob (IND); W 4–6, 6–4, 7–5, 6–3	H Cochet (FRA); L 6–2, 5–7, 6–2, 6–3	U de Morpurgo (ITA); L 1–6, 6–1, 8–6, 4–6, 7–5
5	Takeichi Harada	Japan	Bye	L Žemla (TCH); W 6–3, 3–6, 6–2, 6–2	M Cousin (FRA); W w/o	B Gilbert (GBR); W 10–8, 2–6, 11–9, 6–2	U De Morpurgo (ITA); L 6–4, 6–1, 6–1	did not advance	
5	Sydney Jacob	India	R Morales (ESP); W 6–2, 6–4, 6–4	M Ferrier (SUI); W 5–7, 6–3, 6–1, 6–1	J Willard (AUS); W 6–1, 6–2, 3–6, 2–6, 6–3	W Washburn (USA); W 6–1, 6–4, 8–10, 6–2	J Borotra (FRA); L 4–6, 6–4, 7–5, 6–3	did not advance	
5	René Lacoste	France	Bye	L Göncz (HUN); W 6–0, 6–0, 6–1	J Koželuh (TCH); W 6–1, 6–2, 6–1	P Spence (RSA); W 6–2, 6–0, 6–1	V Richards (USA); L 8–6, 4–6, 1–6, 6–2, 6–3	did not advance	
5	R. Norris Williams	United States	Bye	SM Hadi (IND); W 6–0, 6–2, 6–1	P Macenauer (TCH); W 6–2, 4–6, 3–6, 6–2, 6–1	B von Kehrling (HUN); W 6–4, 3–6, 6–3, 4–6, 6–3	H Cochet (FRA); L 5–7, 6–3, 6–2, 6–4	did not advance	
9	Manuel Alonso Areizaga	Spain	Bye	R Sabbadini (ITA); W w/o	G Robson (ARG); W 7–9, 6–4, 6–0, 6–4	V Richards (USA); L 7–5, 10–8, 2–6, 6–3	did not advance		
9	Masanosuke Fukuda	Japan	Bye	P Wheatley (GBR); W 6–2, 6–4, 6–3	H Timmer (NED); W 8–6, 6–4, 5–7, 6–4	H Cochet (FRA); L 6–2, 6–1, 6–3	did not advance		
9	Brian Gilbert	Great Britain	Đ Dunđerski (YUG); W 8–6, 6–1, 2–6, 6–2	G Leembruggen (NED); W 6–1, 12–10, 6–1	J Bayley (AUS); W 7–5, 9–7, 6–1	T Harada (JPN); L 10–8, 2–6, 11–9, 6–2	did not advance		
9	Béla von Kehrling	Hungary	Bye	A Roman (ROU); W 6–1, 6–1, 6–2	C Aeschlimann (SUI); W 4–6, 6–8, 7–5, 6–2, 6–3	RN Williams (USA); L 6–4, 3–6, 6–3, 4–6, 6–3	did not advance		
9	Algernon Kingscote	Great Britain	F Rohrer (TCH); W 6–3, 6–4, 4–6, 3–6, 6–3	H Müller (SWE); W 6–2, 7–5, 6–2	R Granholm (FIN); W 6–2, 6–0, 6–2	J Borotra (FRA); L 6–1, 6–3, 6–1	did not advance		
9	Pat Spence	South Africa	Bye	H Syz (SUI); W 6–3, 6–2, 7–5	M Woosnam (GBR); W 4–6, 10–8, 6–3, 3–6, 6–3	R Lacoste (FRA); L 6–2, 6–0, 6–1	did not advance		
9	Watson Washburn	United States	C Serventi (ITA); W 6–4, 6–3, 6–4	G Lupu (ROU); W 6–2, 6–3, 6–4	C van Lennep (NED); W 2–6, 6–1, 6–1, 6–2	S Jacob (IND); L 6–1, 6–4, 8–10, 6–2	did not advance		
9	Jean Washer	Belgium	N Mișu (ROU); W 6–3, 6–4, 6–2	E Flaquer (ESP); W 6–1, 6–4, 7–5	F Hunter (USA); W 2–6, 1–6, 6–2, 6–1, 6–4	U De Morpurgo (ITA); L 2–6, 6–4, 1–6, 6–4, 8–6	did not advance		
17	Charles Aeschlimann	Switzerland	Bye	C Dumas (ARG); W 7–5, 6–4, 6–0	B von Kehrling (HUN); L 4–6, 6–8, 7–5, 6–2, 6–3	did not advance			
17	James Bayley	Australia	B Schildt (FIN); W 6–1, 6–3, 6–4	E Bache (DEN); W 6–2, 6–1, 6–2	B Gilbert (GBR); L 7–5, 9–7, 6–1	did not advance			
17	Marcel Cousin	France	J Condon (RSA); W 4–6, 6–3, 6–2, 6–4	C Wennergren (SWE); W 6–4, 6–3, 6–2	T Harada (JPN); L w/o	did not advance			
17	Runar Granholm	Finland	Bye	N Brookes (AUS); W w/o	A Kingscote (GBR); L 6–2, 6–0, 6–2	did not advance			
17	Francis Hunter	United States	A Grahn (FIN); W 6–3, 6–0, 6–2	A Hortal (ARG); W 6–3, 6–3, 6–1	J Washer (BEL); L 2–6, 1–6, 6–2, 6–1, 6–4	did not advance			
17	Jan Koželuh	Czechoslovakia	Bye	S Okamoto (JPN); W 4–6, 7–5, 10–8, 4–6, 6–4	R Lacoste (FRA); L 6–1, 6–2, 6–1	did not advance			
17	Pavel Macenauer	Czechoslovakia	Bye	A Lammens (BEL); W 6–0, 6–1, 6–0	RN Williams (USA); L 6–2, 4–6, 3–6, 6–2, 6–1	did not advance			
17	Jack Nielsen	Norway	I Balás (YUG); W w/o	E Tegner (DEN); W 5–7, 6–4, 6–4, 9–7	J Borotra (FRA); L 6–0, 6–1, 6–2	did not advance			
17	Ivie Richardson	South Africa	Bye	F Sindreu (ESP); W 6–4, 6–4, 6–3	H Cochet (FRA); L 6–3, 6–4, 6–4	did not advance			
17	Guillermo Robson	Argentina	Bye	M Stern (ROU); W w/o	M Alonso Areizaga (ESP); L 7–9, 6–4, 6–0, 6–4	did not advance			
17	Mohammed Sleem	India	Bye	M van der Feen (NED); W 6–4, 6–1, 6–4	V Richards (USA); L 8–6, 2–6, 6–4, 4–6, 6–2	did not advance			
17	Hendrik Timmer	Netherlands	Bye	E Ulrich (DEN); W 6–3, 2–6, 1–6, 6–2, 6–3	M Fukuda (JPN); L 8–6, 6–4, 5–7, 6–4	did not advance			
17	Christiaan van Lennep	Netherlands	S-C Wu (ROC); W w/o	A Cattaruzza (ARG); W 6–3, 6–1, 6–1	W Washburn (USA); L 2–6, 6–1, 6–1, 6–2	did not advance			
17	James Willard	Australia	L Raymond (RSA); W 2–6, 6–4, 6–4, 2–6, 6–4	S Halot (BEL); W 8–6, 6–2, 6–2	S Jacob (IND); L 6–1, 6–2, 3–6, 2–6, 6–3	did not advance			
17	Max Woosnam	Great Britain	Bye	B Thalbitzer (DEN); W 6–1, 6–1, 6–2	P Spence (RSA); L 4–6, 10–8, 6–3, 3–6, 6–3	did not advance			
17	Augustos Zerlendis	Greece	S-K Ng (ROC); W w/o	A-A Fyzee (IND); W 6–3, 1–6, 3–6, 6–3, 6–4	U De Morpurgo (ITA); L 6–0, 6–2, 6–4	did not advance			
33	Einar Bache	Denmark	M Lozano (MEX); W 2–6, 8–6, 9–7, 6–4	J Bayley (AUS); L 6–2, 6–1, 6–2	did not advance				
33	Américo Cattaruzza	Argentina	P Papadopoulos (GRE); W 7–5, 7–5, 6–1	C van Lennep (NED); L 6–3, 6–1, 6–1	did not advance				
33	Pablo Debran	Switzerland	D McCrea (IRL); W 6–4, 6–4, 6–0	U De Morpurgo (ITA); L 6–2, 6–3, 6–3	did not advance				
33	Carlos Dumas	Argentina	Bye	C Aeschlimann (SUI); L 7–5, 6–4, 6–0	did not advance				
33	Maurice Ferrier	Switzerland	E Schybergson (FIN); W 6–4, 6–3, 6–3	S Jacob (IND); L 5–7, 6–3, 6–1, 6–1	did not advance				
33	Eduardo Flaquer	Spain	D Torralva (CHI); W 6–4, 3–6, 6–0, 6–0	J Washer (BEL); L 6–1, 6–4, 7–5	did not advance				
33	Athar-Ali Fyzee	India	C Langaard (NOR); W 6–2, 6–2, 6–3	A Zerlendis (GRE); L 6–3, 1–6, 3–6, 6–3, 6–4	did not advance				
33	Lajos Göncz	Hungary	Bye	R Lacoste (FRA); L 6–0, 6–0, 6–1	did not advance				
33	Syed Mohammad Hadi	India	Bye	RN Williams (USA); L 6–0, 6–2, 6–1	did not advance				
33	Stéphane Halot	Belgium	W Ireland (IRL); W 6–1, 6–4, 6–4	J Willard (AUS); L 8–6, 6–2, 6–2	did not advance				
33	Arturo Hortal	Argentina	R de Castro Pereira (POR); W 6–1, 6–4, 6–2	F Hunter (USA); L 6–3, 6–3, 6–1	did not advance				
33	Albert Lammens	Belgium	Bye	P Macenauer (TCH); L 6–0, 6–1, 6–0	did not advance				
33	Victor de Laveleye	Belgium	Bye	V Richards (USA); L 6–2, 6–4, 6–0	did not advance				
33	Gerard Leembruggen	Netherlands	H-H Khoo (ROC); W w/o	Brian Gilbert (GBR); L 6–1, 12–10, 6–1	did not advance				
33	Gheorghe Lupu	Romania	F del Canto (MEX); W 6–4, 6–3, 6–4	W Washburn (USA); L 6–2, 6–3, 6–4	did not advance				
33	Henning Müller	Sweden	WL Wei (ROC); W w/o	A Kingscote (GBR); L 6–2, 7–5, 6–2	did not advance				
33	Sunao Okamoto	Japan	Bye	J Koželuh (TCH); L 4–6, 7–5, 10–8, 4–6, 6–4	did not advance				
33	Alexandru Roman	Romania	Bye	B von Kehrling (HUN); L 6–1, 6–1, 6–2	did not advance				
33	Francisco Sindreu	Spain	Bye	I Richardson (RSA); L 6–4, 6–4, 6–3	did not advance				
33	Hans Syz	Switzerland	Bye	P Spence (RSA); L 6–3, 6–2, 7–5	did not advance				
33	Erik Tegner	Denmark	A von Kelemen (HUN); W 6–4, 6–1, 6–1	J Nielsen (NOR); L 5–7, 6–4, 6–4, 9–7	did not advance				
33	Bjørn Thalbitzer	Denmark	Bye	M Woosnam (GBR); L 6–1, 6–1, 6–2	did not advance				
33	Luis Torralva	Chile	A Casanovas (POR); W w/o	J Borotra (FRA); L 9–7, 7–5, 7–5	did not advance				
33	Einer Ulrich	Denmark	Bye	H Timmer (NED); L 6–3, 2–6, 1–6, 6–2, 6–3	did not advance				
33	Maas van der Feen	Netherlands	Bye	M Sleem (IND); L 6–4, 6–1, 6–4	did not advance				
33	Charles Wennergren	Sweden	K Kirchmayer (HUN); W 8–6, 6–2, 6–4	M Cousin (FRA); L 6–4, 6–3, 6–2	did not advance				
33	Patrick Wheatley	Great Britain	Bye	M Fukuda (JPN); L 6–2, 6–4, 6–3	did not advance				
33	Ladislav Žemla	Czechoslovakia	Bye	T Harada (JPN); L 6–3, 3–6, 6–2, 6–2	did not advance				
61	Félix del Canto	Mexico	G Lupu (ROU); L 6–4, 6–3, 6–4	did not advance					
61	Jack Condon	South Africa	M Cousin (FRA); L 4–6, 6–3, 6–2, 6–4	did not advance					
61	Đorđe Dunđerski	Yugoslavia	Brian Gilbert (GBR); L 8–6, 6–1, 2–6, 6–2	did not advance					
61	Arne Grahn	Finland	F Hunter (USA); L 6–3, 6–0, 6–2	did not advance					
61	Asaji Honda	Japan	J Borotra (FRA); L 6–3, 6–3, 7–5	did not advance					
61	Rodrigo de Castro Pereira	Portugal	A Hortal (ARG); L 6–1, 6–4, 6–2	did not advance					
61	Walter Ireland	Ireland	S Halot (BEL); L 6–1, 6–4, 6–4	did not advance					
61	Aurél von Kelemen	Hungary	E Tegner (DEN); L 6–4, 6–1, 6–1	did not advance					
61	Kálmán Kirchmayer	Hungary	C Wennergren (SWE); L 8–6, 6–2, 6–4	did not advance					
61	Conrad Langaard	India	A-A Fyzee (NOR); L 6–2, 6–2, 6–3	did not advance					
61	Mariano Lozano	Mexico	E Bache (DEN); L 2–6, 8–6, 9–7, 6–4	did not advance					
61	D'Arcy McCrea	Ireland	P Debran (SUI); L 6–4, 6–4, 6–0	did not advance					
61	Nicolae Mișu	Romania	J Washer (BEL); L 6–3, 6–4, 6–2	did not advance					
61	Raimundo Morales	Spain	S Jacob (IND); L 6–2, 6–4, 6–4	did not advance					
61	Pantelis Papadopoulos	Greece	A Cattaruzza (ARG); L 7–5, 7–5, 6–1	did not advance					
61	Louis Raymond	South Africa	J Willard (AUS); L 2–6, 6–4, 6–4, 2–6, 6–4	did not advance					
61	Friedrich Rohrer	Czechoslovakia	A Kingscote (GBR); L 6–3, 6–4, 4–6, 3–6, 6–3	did not advance					
61	Boris Schildt	Finland	J Bayley (AUS); L 6–1, 6–3, 6–4	did not advance					
61	Ernst Schybergson	Finland	M Ferrier (SUI); L 6–4, 6–3, 6–3	did not advance					
61	Clemente Serventi	Italy	W Washburn (USA); L 6–4, 6–3, 6–4	did not advance					
61	Domingo Torralva	Chile	E Flaquer (ESP); L 6–4, 3–6, 6–0, 6–0	did not advance					
61	Camille Wolff	Luxembourg	U De Morpurgo (ITA); L 6–1, 6–0, 6–0	did not advance					
—	Iván Balás	Yugoslavia	J Nielsen (NOR); L w/o	did not advance					
—	Norman Brookes	Australia	Bye	R Granholm (FIN); L w/o	did not advance				
—	Antonio Casanovas	Portugal	L Torralva (CHI); L w/o	did not advance					
—	Cesare Colombo	Italy	Bye	H Cochet (FRA); L w/o	did not advance				
—	Khoo Hooi-Hye	Republic of China	G Leembruggen (NED); L w/o	did not advance					
—	Ng Sze-Kwang	Republic of China	A Zerlendis (GRE); L w/o	did not advance					
—	Riccardo Sabbadini	Italy	Bye	M Alonso Areizaga (ESP); L w/o	did not advance				
—	Misu Stern	Romania	Bye	Guillermo Robson (ARG); L w/o	did not advance				
—	Wei Wing Lock	Republic of China	H Müller (SWE); L w/o	did not advance					
—	Wu Sze-Cheung	Republic of China	C van Lennep (NED); L w/o	did not advance					

== Sources ==
- ITF, 2008 Olympic Tennis Event Media Guide
- M. Avé, Comité Olympique Français (ed.). Les Jeux de la VIII^{e} Olympiade Paris 1924 – Rapport Officiel (PDF) (in French). Paris: Librairie de France. pp. 379–384. Archived (PDF) from the original on 5 May 2011.
