= 1924 International Lawn Tennis Challenge =

International tennis tournament

Details
- Duration: 12 May – 13 September 1924
- Edition: 19th
- Teams: 22

Champion
- Winning nation: United States

The 1924 International Lawn Tennis Challenge was the 19th edition of what is now known as the Davis Cup. The tournament was, for the second straight year, divided into the America and Europe Zones. 17 teams competed in the Europe Zone, and 6 in America. China, Cuba, Hungary, Mexico, and New Zealand all competed for the first time, and South Africa and Austria returned to create the largest field to date.

For the second straight year, Australia defeated France in the Inter-Zonal play-off, but once again fell to the United States in the challenge round. The final was played at the Germantown Cricket Club in Philadelphia, Pennsylvania, United States on 11–13 September.

== America Zone ==
=== Draw ===
Quarterfinals; 24 July–1 August
Mexico
bye
Brooklyn, NY, United States (grass)
China	0
Australia	5
Ottawa, Canada (clay)
Canada	3
Cuba	2
bye
Japan

Semifinals; 7–10 August
Baltimore, MD, United States (grass)
Mexico	0
Australia	5
Montreal, Canada (grass)
Canada	1
Japan	4

Final; 14–16 August
Providence, RI, United States (grass)
Australia	5
Japan	0

=== Final ===
Australia vs. Japan

Australia
5
Agawam Hunt Club, Providence, RI, United States
14–16 August 1924
Grass

Japan
0

			1	2	3	4	5
1	(Australia) (Japan)	Gerald Patterson; Zenzo Shimizu	7; 5	11; 9	6; 4
2	(Australia) (Japan)	Pat O'Hara Wood; Sunao Okamoto	6; 4	2; 6	6; 4	2; 6	6; 1
3	(Australia) (Japan)	Pat O'Hara Wood / Gerald Patterson; Takeichi Harada / Sunao Okamoto	7; 5	6; 2	6; 4
4	(Australia) (Japan)	Gerald Patterson; Sunao Okamoto	7; 5	6; 1	6; 4
5	(Australia) (Japan)	Pat O'Hara Wood; Zenzo Shimizu	6; 4	6; 4	6; 2

== Europe Zone ==
=== Draw ===
First round
Torquay, England (clay)
Great Britain	3
Belgium	2

Second round
Birmingham, England (grass)
Great Britain	3
Spain	2
Argentina
South Africa	w/o
Arnhem, Netherlands (clay)
Netherlands	1
India	4
Dublin, Ireland (grass)
Ireland	0
France	5
Copenhagen, Denmark
Hungary	2
Denmark	3
Romania
Italy	w/o
Prague, Czechoslovakia
Czechoslovakia	4
New Zealand	0
Vienna, Austria
Switzerland	4
Austria	1

Quarterfinals
Scarborough, England (grass)
Great Britain	4
South Africa	1
Paris, France (clay)
India	0
France	4
Copenhagen, Denmark
Denmark	3
Italy	2
Prague, Czechoslovakia
Czechoslovakia	4
Switzerland	1

Semifinals
Eastbourne, England (grass)
Great Britain	1
France	4
Copenhagen, Denmark
Denmark	2
Czechoslovakia	3

Final
Évian-les-Bains, France (clay)
France	5
Czechoslovakia	0

=== Final ===
France vs. Czechoslovakia

France
5
Évian Sports Club, Évian-les-Bains, France
3–5 August 1924
Clay

Czechoslovakia
0

			1	2	3	4	5
1	(France) (Czechoslovakia)	René Lacoste; Pavel Macenauer	6; 2	10; 8	6; 4
2	(France) (Czechoslovakia)	Henri Cochet; Ladislav Žemla	6; 1	8; 6	6; 4
3	(France) (Czechoslovakia)	Jacques Brugnon / Henri Cochet; Jan Koželuh / Ladislav Žemla	7; 5	3; 6	6; 4	6; 4
4	(France) (Czechoslovakia)	René Lacoste; Ladislav Žemla	6; 3	6; 2	6; 2
5	(France) (Czechoslovakia)	Henri Cochet; Pavel Macenauer	6; 4	3; 6	7; 5	3; 6	6; 2

== Inter-Zonal Final ==
Australia vs. France

Australia
3
Longwood Cricket Club, Boston, MA, United States
4–6 September 1924
Grass

France
2

			1	2	3	4	5
1	(Australia) (France)	Gerald Patterson; René Lacoste	3; 6	2; 6	8; 10
2	(Australia) (France)	Pat O'Hara Wood; Jean Borotra	1; 6	6; 4	1; 6	6; 4	6; 2
3	(Australia) (France)	Pat O'Hara Wood / Gerald Patterson; Jacques Brugnon / René Lacoste	6; 4	6; 4	6; 2
4	(Australia) (France)	Pat O'Hara Wood; René Lacoste	10; 8	1; 6	1; 6	5; 7
5	(Australia) (France)	Gerald Patterson; Jean Borotra	6; 3	6; 1	6; 3

== Challenge Round ==
United States vs. Australia

United States
5
Germantown Cricket Club, Philadelphia, PA, United States
11–13 September 1924
Grass

Australia
0

			1	2	3	4	5
1	(United States) (Australia)	Bill Tilden; Gerald Patterson	6; 4	6; 2	6; 2
2	(United States) (Australia)	Vincent Richards; Pat O'Hara Wood	6; 3	6; 2	6; 4
3	(United States) (Australia)	Bill Johnston / Bill Tilden; Pat O'Hara Wood / Gerald Patterson	5; 7	6; 3	6; 4	6; 1
4	(United States) (Australia)	Bill Tilden; Pat O'Hara Wood	6; 2	6; 1	6; 1
5	(United States) (Australia)	Vincent Richards; Gerald Patterson	6; 3	7; 5	6; 4

== See also ==
- 1924 Wightman Cup
