= Sunao Okamoto =

Japanese tennis player (1894–1955)

- Country (sports): Japan
- Born: 1 September 1894; Higashi-ku, Okayama, Okayama, Japan
- Died: 2 September 1955 (aged 61)
- Turned pro: 1920 (amateur)
- Retired: 1928

Singles
- Career titles: 9

Grand Slam singles results
- Wimbledon: 1R (1924)
- US Open: 3R (1924)

Other tournaments
- Olympic Games: 2R (1924)

Doubles

Grand Slam doubles results
- Wimbledon: 3R (1924)

Other doubles tournaments
- Olympic Games: 2R (1924)

Sunao Okamoto (岡本 忠, Okamoto Sunao, 1 September 1894 – 2 September 1955) was a Japanese male tennis player who represented Japan in the Davis Cup and the Olympic Games. He competed at both the Wimbledon Championships and U.S. National Championships in 1924. He won 9 career singles titles at tournaments maninly played in India.

== Career ==
Okamoto competed in the singles and doubles events at the 1924 Summer Olympics. In the singles event he had a bye in the first round and lost in the second round to Jan Koželuh. With compatriot Takeichi Harada he won in the first round against Bjørn Thalbitzer and Einar Bache for the loss of just one game. In the second round they were beaten by the Spanish brothers José Alonso and Manuel Alonso in four sets.

Okamoto participated in the 1924 Wimbledon Championships, playing in the singles and doubles events. In the singles he lost in the first round in four sets to eventual finalist René Lacoste. In the doubles he teamed up with Khoo Hooi-Hye, reaching the third round in which eventual champions Frank Hunter and Vincent Richards proved too strong.

His other career singles highlights include winning the Bengal Championships in Calcuta four times (1921, 1923, 1925, 1928). He also won the Indian International Championships three times (1923, 1924, 1927) and the Western India Championships two times (1923, 1925).

He became president of the Dai Ichi Trading company and later in life was an adviser to the finance ministry.
