= 1928 French Championships – Men's singles =

Men's singles
- 1928 French Championships

Final
- Champion: (France) Henri Cochet
- Runner-up: (France) René Lacoste
- Score: 5–7, 6–3, 6–1, 6–3

Details
- Draw: 70
- Seeds: 16

Events
Singles	men	women		boys	girls
Doubles	men	women	mixed	boys	girls
← 1927 ·	French Championships	· 1929 →

Henri Cochet defeated René Lacoste 5–7, 6–3, 6–1, 6–3 in the final to win the men's singles tennis title at the 1928 French Championships.

== Seeds ==
The seeded players are listed below. Henri Cochet is the champion; others show the round in which they were eliminated.

1. (France) René Lacoste (finalist)
2. (United States) Frank Hunter (fourth round)
3. (France) Edouard Borotra (third round)
4. (United Kingdom) Mohammed Sleem (fourth round)
5. (United Kingdom) J. Colin Gregory (third round)
6. (Netherlands) Hendrik Timmer (second round)
7. (Argentina) Ronaldo Boyd (quarterfinals)
8. (Australia) Jack Crawford (quarterfinals)
9. (United Kingdom) Nigel Sharpe (third round)
10. (Australia) Norman Brookes (second round)
11. (Australia) Gerald Patterson (fourth round)
12. (Argentina) Guillermo Robson (fourth round)
13. (France) Jacques Brugnon (quarterfinals)
14. (Australia) Harry Hopman (second round)
15. (France) Henri Cochet (champion)
16. (Austria) Franz Matejka (fourth round)

== Draw ==
=== Key ===
- Q = Qualifier
- WC = Wild card
- LL = Lucky loser
- r = Retired

=== Finals ===
Quarterfinals
1	(France) René Lacoste	6	6	7
8	(Australia) Jack Crawford	0	1	5
13	(France) Jacques Brugnon	6	6	3	3	4
(Australia) Jack Hawkes	4	3	6	6	6
(France) Christian Boussus	1	6	5	3
(France) Jean Borotra	6	3	7	6
7	(Argentina) Ronaldo Boyd	5	4	2
15	(France) Henri Cochet	7	6	6

Semifinals
1	(France) René Lacoste	6	6	6
(Australia) Jack Hawkes	2	4	1
(France) Jean Borotra	3	6	5	4
15	(France) Henri Cochet	6	2	7	6

Final
1	(France) René Lacoste	7	3	1	3
15	(France) Henri Cochet	5	6	6	6

=== Earlier rounds ===
==== Section 1 ====
First round

Second round
1	(France) Lacoste	6	6	3	6
(France) Persin	1	1	6	3
(United Kingdom) Crawford
(France) Rodel
16	(Austria) Matejka	6	6	6
(Argentina) Zappa	1	3	4
(France) Bernard	2	1	1
(Netherlands) Van Lennep	6	6	6

Third round
1	(France) Lacoste	6	6	6
(France) Rodel	0	0	2
16	(Austria) Matejka	3	8	6
(Netherlands) Van Lennep	6	6	2	r

Fourth round
1	(France) Lacoste	6	6	6
16	(Austria) Matejka	2	0	3

==== Section 2 ====
First round

Second round
8	(Australia) Crawford	7	6	6	6
(France) Geraud	9	4	3	1
(France) Rigault	2	4	1
(South Africa) Holthouse	6	6	6
9	(United Kingdom) Sharpe	10	6	6
(France) Deniau	8	4	1
(South Africa) Walcott	6	6	4	4	2
(France) Gentien	3	2	6	6	6

Third round
8	(Australia) Crawford	6	6	6
(South Africa) Holthouse	3	4	1
9	(United Kingdom) Sharpe	2	3	2
(France) Gentien	6	6	6

Fourth round
8	(Australia) Crawford	6	2	6	7
(France) Gentien	1	6	4	5

==== Section 3 ====
First round

Second round
4	(United Kingdom) Sleem	6	6	6
(France) Augustin	3	1	2
(France) Thurneyssen	6	1	3	4
(Argentina) Cattaruza	1	6	6	6
(France) Danet	4	2	8	6	1
3	(France) Borotra	6	6	6	3	6
(Philippines) Aragon	0	3	3	r
13	(France) Brugnon	6	6	4

Third round
4	(United Kingdom) Sleem	6	8	6
(Argentina) Cattaruza	1	6	2
3	(France) Borotra	2	3	2
13	(France) Brugnon	6	6	6

Fourth round
4	(United Kingdom) Sleem	2	2	9
13	(France) Brugnon	6	6	11

==== Section 4 ====
First round
(France) Piel	0	7	2
(France) Samazeuilh	6	9	6
(Greece) Zerlendis	6	6	7
(United States) Stralem	1	3	5
(France) Guillemot	1	4	6	3
(France) Landry	6	6	1	6

Second round
5	(United Kingdom) Gregory	6	6	8
(Netherlands) Koopman	3	1	6
(Australia) Hawkes	6	6	6
(France) Siguier	0	3	2
12	(Argentina) Robson	6	6	6
(France) Samazeuilh	4	1	1
(Greece) Zerlendis	0	4	7	4
(France) Landry	6	6	5	6

Third round
5	(United Kingdom) Gregory	4	3	6	3
(Australia) Hawkes	6	6	0	6
12	(Argentina) Robson	4	6	6	6
(France) Landry	6	3	3	1

Fourth round
(Australia) Hawkes	6	6	4	6
12	(Argentina) Robson	2	3	6	1

==== Section 5 ====
First round
(France) Boussus	6	5	6	6
(Argentina) Morea	3	7	3	4
(France) Laurent	6	4	6	6
(United States) Pope	4	6	1	2
(Monaco) Galeppe	3	4	4
(United Kingdom) Bobb	6	6	6

Second round
(France) Boussus	6	6	6
(France) Laurent	1	3	2
(United Kingdom) Bobb	2	6	6	1	6
(France) Grandguillot	6	1	0	6	8
(Chile) Torralva-Ponsa	2	6	6	6
(France) Du Plaix	6	0	3	4
(Philippines) Ingayo	4	6	6	0
11	(Australia) Patterson	6	3	8	6

Third round
(France) Boussus	6	6	6
(France) Grandguillot	1	2	2
(Chile) Torralva-Ponsa	6	6	3	5	4
11	(Australia) Patterson	3	1	6	7	6

Fourth round
(France) Boussus	6	5	9
11	(Australia) Patterson	1	7	7	r

==== Section 6 ====
First round

Second round
6	(Netherlands) Timmer
(France) Aron
(France) Gaston	6	2	6	6
14	(Australia) Hopman	1	6	3	1
(United Kingdom) Turnbull	6	6	6
(Argentina) Del Castillo	0	1	1
(Republic of Ireland) Rogers Lyttelton
(France) Borotra

Third round
(France) Aron	3	8	3	1
(France) Gaston	6	6	6	6
(United Kingdom) Turnbull	3	6	6	3
(France) Borotra	6	1	8	6

Fourth round
(France) Gaston	6	4	1	6	3
(France) Borotra	3	6	6	4	6

==== Section 7 ====
First round

Second round
(France) De Buzelet	6	6	4	6
(Greece) Balli	2	2	6	1
10	(Australia) Brookes
(France) Grandguillot
(Austria) Artens
(France) Rebois
(France) Glasser	4	4	1
7	(Argentina) Boyd	6	6	6

Third round
(France) De Buzelet
(France) Grandguillot
(Austria) Artens	1	4	1
7	(Argentina) Boyd	6	6	6

Fourth round
(France) Grandguillot	5	3	1
7	(Argentina) Boyd	7	6	6

==== Section 8 ====
First round

Second round
15	(France) Cochet	6	6	6
(Denmark) Thalbitzer	2	0	1
(United States) Wood	6	1	7	10
(France) Barrelet De Ricou	4	6	5	8
(United Kingdom) Kingsley	6	6	6
(France) Bonte	4	2	2
(France) Combemale	0	3	2
2	(United States) Hunter	6	6	6

Third round
15	(France) Cochet	6	6	7
(United States) Wood	1	0	5
(United Kingdom) Kingsley	2	8	4
2	(United States) Hunter	6	10	6

Fourth round
15	(France) Cochet	1	6	6	6
2	(United States) Hunter	6	3	4	3

Preceded by 1928 Australian Championships – Men's singles	Grand Slam men's singles	Succeeded by 1928 Wimbledon Championships – Men's singles
