= Gerard Leembruggen =

Dutch tennis player (1897–1980)

- Country (sports): Netherlands
- Born: 26 February 1897 Amsterdam, Netherlands
- Died: 13 May 1980 (aged 83) The Hague, Netherlands

Singles

Grand Slam singles results
- Wimbledon: 2R (1924, 1925, 1926)

Other tournaments
- Olympic Games: 2R (1924)

Doubles

Grand Slam doubles results
- Wimbledon: 1R (1924, 1925, 1926, 1934)

Other doubles tournaments
- Olympic Games: 1R (1924)

Grand Slam mixed doubles results
- Wimbledon: 1R (1924)

Gerard Leembruggen (26 February 1897 – 13 May 1980) was a Dutch male tennis player who represented The Netherlands in the Davis Cup and the Olympic Games. He competed in the singles and doubles events at the 1924 Summer Olympics. In the singles event he had a walkover in the first round and lost in the second round to Brian Gilbert in three straight sets. With compatriot Marius van der Feen he lost in the first round against the Czechoslovak pair Ladislav Žemla and Jan Koželuh, also in straight sets.

Leembruggen competed in four Wimbledon Championships between 1924 and 1934. He reached the second round of the singles event in 1924, 1925 and 1926. In the doubles he teamed up with Bylandt (1924), Marinus van der Feen (1925, 1926) and Joop Knottenbelt (1934) but did not make it past the first round in four attempts. His only participation in the mixed doubles, with Hilary Stebbing in 1924, also ended in the first round.
