= Debran =

Debran is a surname. Notable people with the surname include:

- Pablo Debran (1899–1969), Swiss tennis player
- Roy Debran, American baseball player
