= Lajos Göncz =

Hungarian tennis player

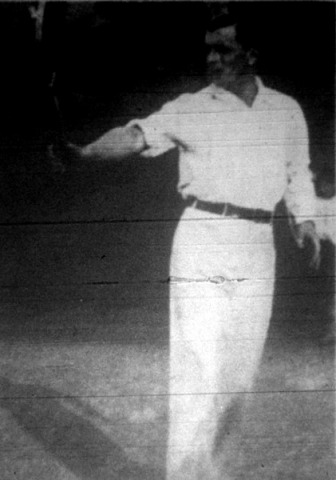
- Lajos Göncz in 1924
- Country (sports): Hungary
- Born: 16 June 1887 Kőszeg, Austria-Hungary
- Died: 14 October 1974 (aged 87) Budapest, Hungary
- Plays: Right-handed

Other tournaments
- Olympic Games: 2R (1924)

Lajos Göncz de Gönc (Hungarian: gönci Göncz Lajos; 16 June 1887 – 14 October 1974) was a Hungarian tennis player and coach, who competed at the 1924 Summer Olympics.

He was also the father of politician and writer Árpád Göncz, who served as president of Hungary between 1990 and 2000. His granddaughter is minister Kinga Göncz.

== Biography ==
Lajos Göncz was born in Kőszeg into a Roman Catholic family of noble origin as the son of Árpád Göncz, Sr. (1858–1928), who functioned as Deputy Secretary of State, and Natália Fejér de Mankóbük (c. 1870–1943). He had four elder sisters, Etelka, Natália, Emma and Gabriella. His family originated from Csáktornya, Zala County (today Čakovec, Croatia), where his grandfather, Lajos Göncz, Sr. was a pharmacist, who later participated in the Hungarian Revolution of 1848 and following the defeat, he was sentenced to nine years in prison.

Göncz was a senior officer at Magyar Posta before turning professional as a tennis player and coach. He participated in the 1924 Summer Olympics, where he was defeated by René Lacoste in men's singles at the second round (0–6, 0–6, 1–6). He also played in men's doubles, alongside Kálmán Kirchmayr, where they were defeated by R. Norris Williams and Watson Washburn (1–6, 0–6, 0–6). Following his player career, Göncz became a coach and lecturer at the Hungarian Royal College of Physical Education. In early 1930s, he was head coach of Hungary's tennis youth team within the Hungarian Tennis Association.

He married Ilona Haimann (b. 1892) in Budapest, who was a Unitarian and born in Transylvania but raised in the capital city after some years of orphanage. She had Jewish and Székely roots. Their only son was Árpád, who was born on 10 February 1922. Lajos Göncz and Ilona Heimann divorced when Árpád was six years old, thus Göncz's relationship with his son became tense in the following years. After the divorce, his ex-wife and son lived in his parents' house, where the woman was considered to be a second-rate family member. Later, Árpád Göncz recalled that "my father was a source of pain to me... There was no intimate, close and loving relationship between us."

== Works ==
- Lajos Göncz: A tenniszjáték iskolája. A Tenniszjáték 7., Athenaeum Sportkönyvtára (ed. János Földessy), Budapest, 1928.

== Bibliography ==
- Kim, Dae Soon (2012). Göncz Árpád – Politikai életrajz (in Hungarian). Scolar Kiadó. ISBN 978-963-244-348-5.
