= Rodrigo de Castro Pereira =

Portuguese tennis player (1887–1983)

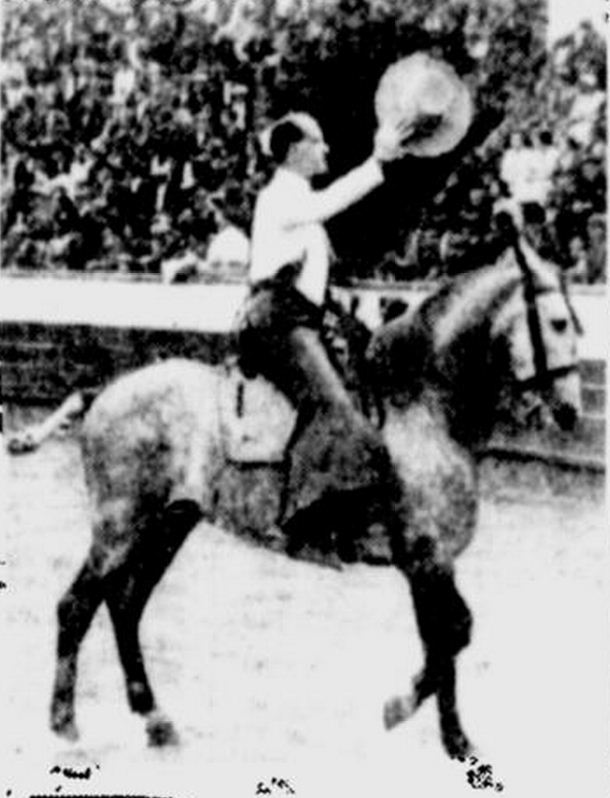
- Rodrigo de Castro Pereira on a bullfight
- Country (sports): Portugal
- Born: 22 July 1887
- Died: 1983 (aged 95–96)
- Plays: right-handed

Grand Slam singles results
- French Open: 2R (1926)
- Wimbledon: 1R (1926)

Other tournaments
- Olympic Games: 1R (1924)

Other doubles tournaments
- Olympic Games: 1R (1924)
- Last updated on: 21 November 2012.

Rodrigo de Castro Pereira (Portuguese pronunciation: [ʁoˈðɾiɣu ðɨ ˈkaʃtɾu pɨˈɾɐjɾɐ]) (22 July 1887 – 1983) was a Portuguese tennis player. He was a one-time Portuguese national singles champion in 1931 and also a one-time doubles title holder. He also won the CSIO Lisbon Equestrian Grand Prix in 1945.

== Early life and family ==
De Castro Pereira was born on 22 July 1887 to Manuel de Castro Pereira, a Bachelor of Laws and Portuguese cavalry officer, and Cecilia van Zeller. His grandfather Rodrigo Delfim Pereira (1823–1891), a Brazilian minister to Berlin, Paris, and Hamburg, titled Lord (Senhor) of Quinta das Murtas, was the illegitimate son of Pedro II of Brazil from his mistress Maria Benedita de Castro do Canto e Melo, Baroness of Sorocaba. His great-grandfather was Pedro I of Brazil, the ruler of Brazil and Portugal and the Algarves in the 1820s and his great-great-grandfather was John VI of Portugal, de facto King of the United Kingdom of Portugal, Brazil and the Algarves and titular Emperor of Brazil. Thus when the Emperor was overthrown in a sudden coup d'état in 1889, leading to the proclamation of the Republic, he was sent to spend his childhood at the royal court of Portugal. At the age of ten, he began practising bullfighting. He graduated from the Academia Militar das Agulhas Negras (Resende, Rio de Janeiro, Brazil) as a civil engineer. At the age of 24 his second cousin once removed Manuel II of Portugal was forced into exile to the United States after the 5 October 1910 revolution; Royalist Rodrigo joined him, fleeing out of fear of being condemned for his affiliations.

== Tennis career ==
In 1924 he competed in tennis at the 1924 Summer Olympics, where he was eliminated in the first round of both singles and doubles by Arturo Hortal and Enrique Maier and Ricardo Saprissa, to whom the Portuguese team gave a walkover. Next year in the 1925 French Championships he was defeated in the first round by Pierre Hirsch. In the follow-up French Championships, he succumbed to Bertie Meyer in five sets. The same year he lost in the Wimbledon first round as well.

In 1927 Pereira was invited into a national squad to represent Portugal in an international team challenge against the Spain Davis Cup team. Two years later he was part of the team who fought a rematch with Spain in Seville, where Arturo Suqué defeated Pereira in two sets. José de Verda and Castro Pereira lost to Enrique de Satrústegui Barrie and Pereira.

At the age of 44 in 1931 he won his first and only national championships trophy in singles.

In April 1933 in the Ernesto Bastos Cup of Laranjeiras, he reached the finals, beating his brother Nuno in the semis. In October he reached the doubles semifinals of the Tijuca tournament with José de Verda. As Portugal was absent from the Davis Cup between 1930 and 1948, in late October de Castro Pereira was drafted into an international team match in Santos, São Paulo, featuring the Brazil team as opponents. Pereira won the singles rubber against Gonçalves and also the doubles partnering Horta Costa against Gonçalves-Tsimonsen.

== Sports diplomat career ==
Rodrigo de Castro Pereira

President of the Federação Portuguesa de Lawn Tennis
- In office 18 January 1934 – 1941
- Preceded by: Guilherme Pinto Basto
- Succeeded by: António Ferro
- In office 1950–1952
- Preceded by: André Navarro
- Succeeded by: Joaquim Miguel Sierra

10th President of the Sociedade Hípica Portuguesa
- In office 1947–1952
- Preceded by: Ferreira de Lima
- Succeeded by: Mário Rafael da Cunha

3rd President of the Federação Equestre Portuguesa
- In office 1957–1967
- Preceded by: Manuel da Costa Latino
- Succeeded by: Kaúlza Oliveira de Arriaga

Personal details
- Relations: Pedro I of Brazil (great-grandfather); John VI of Portugal (great-great-grandfather)
- Education: Academia Militar das Agulhas Negras
- Profession: Civil engineer

In 1934 he was elected the president of the Portuguese Tennis Federation, an office he held twice, assuming it the second time in 1950. He was also the head figure of the Portuguese equestrian movement by first becoming the president of the Portuguese Equestrian Society in 1947 and, a decade later, of the Portuguese Equestrian Federation. He was also the member of the Portuguese Olympic Committee.

== Personal life ==
After emigrating to the United States de Castro Pereira was a blue-collar worker at the Duquesne Works of the United States Steel Corporation for four years. With the help of his degree, he was promoted to Superintendent. Amid World War I he first sought to be enlisted in the Portuguese Army, which was refused; Then in 1917 he joined the American Expeditionary Forces and was transported to France. He earned the rank of captain in the 1st Infantry Division. In 1920 he was appointed vice-president of Dorey Inc., a New York City-based export company. He moved back to Portugal in 1921 and in the 1930s he started working for Fassio Ltd., the Portuguese contractor of the American tractor manufacturer company Allis-Chalmers. In the meantime, he kept on serving at the Portuguese Legion as a captain.

In 1966, he was awarded the Mohammed Taher Trophy by the International Olympic Committee. In 1978 he received the Golden Lion award from the Sporting Club de Portugal.

== Ancestry ==
Ancestors of Rodrigo de Castro Pereira

16. João VI of Portugal
8. Pedro I of Brazil
17. Carlota Joaquina of Spain
4. Rodrigo Delfim Pereira
18. João de Castro do Canto e Melo, 1st viscount of Castro
9. Maria Benedita, Baroness of Sorocaba
19. Escolástica Bonifácia de Toledo Ribas
2. Manuel de Castro Pereira
10. Manuel Maria Bregaro
5. Carolina Bregaro
11. Celestine Clémence Amyot
1. Rodrigo de Castro Pereira
12. Francisco Inácio van Zeller
6. Eduardo van Zeller
13. Ana Adelaide de Almeida Carvalhais
3. Cecilia van Zeller
14. Edward Cairn
7. Isabel Eugenia Cairns
30. James Edwards Henderson
15. Teresa Cairns
31. Mary Henderson
