= Iván Balás =

Yugoslav tennis player

- Country (sports): Kingdom of Serbs, Croats and Slovenes (1922–1928); Hungary (1930–1944)
- Born: 1894 Elemir, Banat, Austria-Hungary
- Died: 1971 (aged 76–77) Paris, France
- Turned pro: 1922 (amateur tour)
- Retired: 1951
- Plays: right-handed

Singles

Other tournaments
- Olympic Games: 1R (1924)

Doubles
- Career record: 2R (1924 Olympic Games)

Team competitions
- Davis Cup: 2R^{EU}

Iván Balás (Serbian: Iván Balaž, Иван Балаж [ǐʋan balâːʒ]; Hungarian: Balázs Iván [ˈbɒlaːʒ ˈivaːn]; 1894 – 1971) was a Yugoslav tennis player of Hungarian ethnicity. He was one of the first to play for the Yugoslavian team at the International Lawn Tennis Challenge, and later the Davis Cup in 1927. Technically, his match was the second rubber of the tie. Apart from team competitions, he clinched international championships for Yugoslavia, Hungary, Austria, Romania and Slovakia in various events.

== Early life and family ==
Iván Balás was born in 1894 in Elemir, Bečkerek (renamed Zrenjanin in 1946), Banat, then part of Austria-Hungary and now Serbia. He was born into a wealthy landowner family of ethnic Hungarians, the son of Iván Balás, Sr. (1866, Tápióbicske – 1909, Budapest and Erna Koronghy (1874, Baracháza – 1850, Budapest). His family's wealth contributed to his rapid growth in tennis. His Hungarian father, built two tennis courts in Elemir where his son Iván learned tennis. Iván attended the Nagybecskerek high school. He continued his studies in Budapest.

== Tennis career ==
In college Balás played tennis as well as basketball, hockey, football and athletics. He began to win club and international tournaments in Nagybecskerek. Balás' first public triumph was recorded in 1922 in the men's singles of the National Championship in Novi Sad.

At the 1924 Olympics in Paris, he played both singles in doubles. In the men's singles, he was defeated in the first round by Jack Nielsen (Norway). And in doubles, he and Đorđe Dunđerski advanced to the second roundbut lost to Jacques Brugnon/Henri Cochet (France).

In 1926, he was crowned the champion of Yugoslavia. He was drafted into the Kingdom of Yugoslavia Davis Cup team for the first-ever Davis Cup match against India in Zagreb in May 1927, joined by Đorđe Dunđerski. Although they didn't win a game or set, both of them provided strong resistance. Balás even had two balls to have a chance to serve out the first set in the match against Hassan-Ali Fyzee, but did not succeed, as the Indian player came back to claim the match. On the third ball, the game was suspended due to bad weather, and so the match was decided after the first two days' results. The organizers agreed not to wait on Monday, but to pass the remaining two dead rubbers and the victory to India.

Balás next represented Hungary, debuting in a match against Austria. At the time, he was fifth/sixth on the Hungarian rankings. In 1930, he earned the second place in mixed doubles at the Bucharest International Championship (lost to Ghica Poulief and Nini Golescu) In Cluj-Napoca he lifted the doubles' trophy with partner Béla Kehrling, defeating Romanian champion Constantin Cantacuzino and Alexandru Botez; he also finished third in singles and mixed contest. In 1931, he reached four doubles finals, including the Hungarian Covered Courts tournament mixed and men's doubles, and the Warsaw International Championships doubles and mixed doubles.

== Personal life ==
In 1928, Balás was engaged in Hungary, and he was no longer in the Davis Cup team of Yugoslavia. He mostly played and practised in Budapest and joined the Magyar Atlétikai Club. In 1944, he moved to Austria, where he continued his tennis career and married Zita Kremmel in 1950. On April 11, 1951, their daughter Charlotte was born. As of 1951 he lived and worked in France, where he was a devoted tennis player and coach for the rest of his life.

Balás died in Paris in 1971. The tennis club Galeb in Zrenjanin organizes a traditional tournament each year that bears his name.

== Works cited ==
=== Primary ===
- Šoškić, Čedomir (2012). Тениски савез Србије Тенис без граници 1922–2012. [Tennis Association of Serbia, Tennis without borders 1922-2012] (PDF) (in Serbian). Belgrade, Serbia: Tennis Association of Serbia. pp. 251–252. Archived from the original (PDF) on 30 December 2013.

=== Secondary ===
- Béla Kehrling, ed. (28 June 1930). "Külföldi hírek" [International news] (PDF). Tennisz és Golf (in Hungarian). II (12). Budapest, Hungary: Bethlen Gábor írod. és Nyomdai Rt: 215.
- Béla Kehrling, ed. (18 March 1931). "Külföldi hírek" [International news] (PDF). Tennisz és Golf (in Hungarian). III (5–6). Budapest, Hungary: Egyesült Kő-, Könyvnyomda, Könyv- és Lapkiadó Rt: 74–75.
- Béla Kehrling, ed. (6 June 1931). "Párizsi Nemzetközi Bajnokságok" [French International Championships] (PDF). Tennisz és Golf (in Hungarian). III (11–12). Budapest, Hungary: Egyesült Kő-, Könyvnyomda. Könyv- és Lapkiadó Rt.: 201–202.
- Béla Kehrling, ed. (22 August 1930). "A Kolozsvári A. C. nemzetközi versenye" [The International Tournament of the AC Cluj-Napoca] (PDF). Tennisz és Golf (in Hungarian). II (15). Budapest, Hungary: Bethlen Gábor Irod. és Nyomdai RT: 295.Cluj-Napoca
