= Walter Ireland (tennis) =

Irish tennis player

Personal information
- Nationality: Irish
- Born: 25 April 1882; Rathmines, Ireland
- Died: 2 November 1932 (aged 50); Liverpool, England

Sport
- Sport: Tennis

Walter Ireland (25 April 1882 – 2 November 1932) was an Irish tennis player. He competed in the men's singles and doubles events at the 1924 Summer Olympics.
