= Kinga Göncz =

Hungarian politician

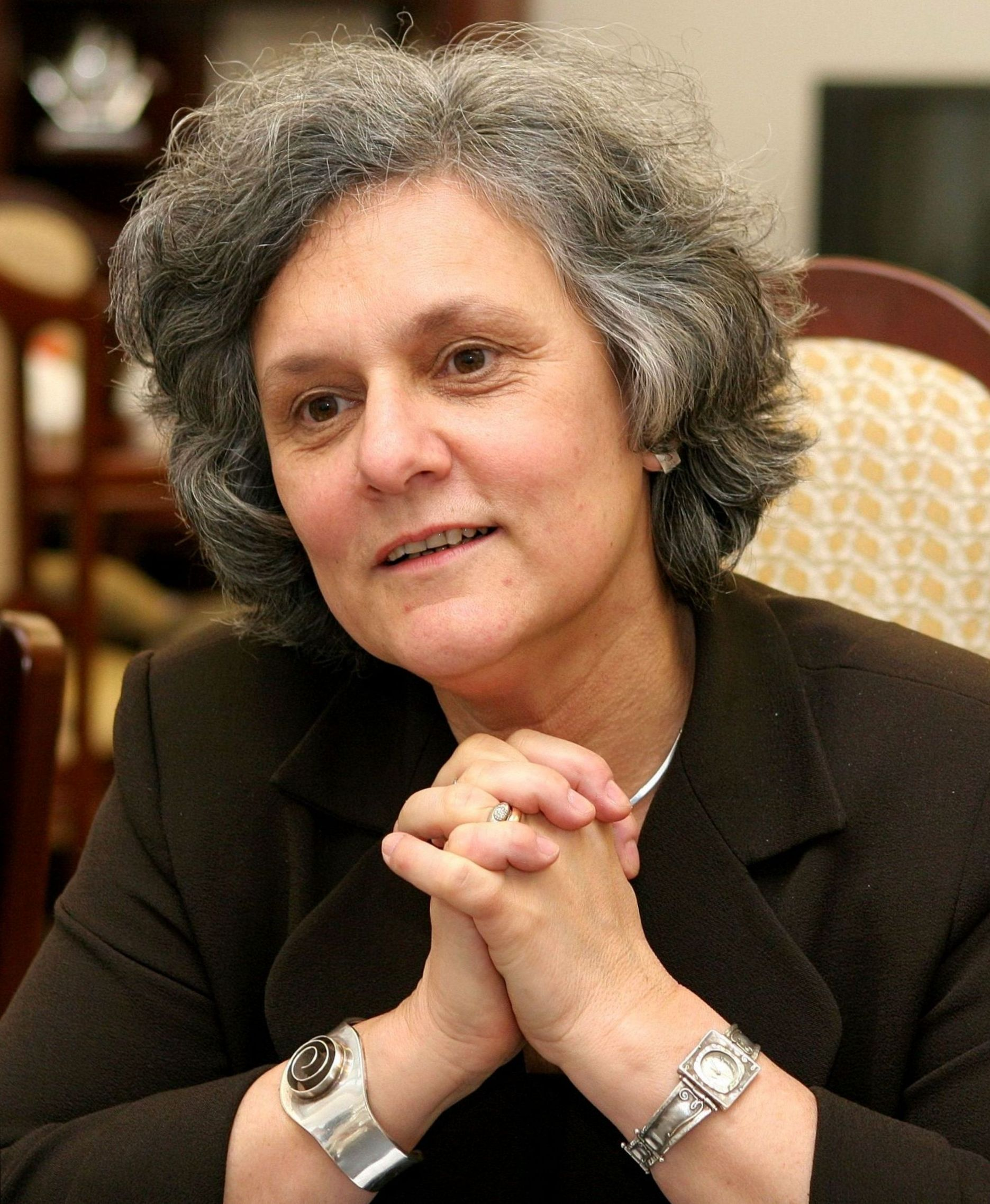
- Göncz in 2007

Member of the European Parliament
- In office 14 July 2009 – 30 June 2014

Minister of Foreign Affairs
- In office 9 June 2006 – 16 April 2009
- Prime Minister: Ferenc Gyurcsány
- Preceded by: Ferenc Somogyi
- Succeeded by: Péter Balázs

Personal details
- Born: 8 November 1947 (age 78) Budapest, Hungary
- Party: MSZP
- Spouse: László Benedek
- Children: 2
- Relatives: Árpád Göncz (father); Lajos Göncz (grandfather)
- Profession: psychiatrist, politician

Kinga Göncz (born 8 November 1947) is a Hungarian academic and the former Minister of Foreign Affairs of Hungary between 2006 and 2009. In 2009 she headed the Hungarian Socialist Party (MSZP) European election list and was subsequently elected as one of 22 Hungarian Members of the European Parliament (MEPs).

== Early life and education ==
Göncz was born on 8 November 1947 in Budapest, Hungary. She is the daughter of Árpád Göncz, former President of Hungary. Her paternal grandfather was tennis player Lajos Göncz. She graduated from the Semmelweis University of Medicine in Budapest in 1972. In 1978, she specialized in psychiatry, in the second half of the 1980s, specialized in psychotherapy. In 2004 she obtained the diploma in psychotherapy of the European Association for Psychotherapy.

== Academic career ==
Göncz worked as a psychiatrist between 1972 and 1978. Following this, she became a senior assistant at the National Medical Rehabilitation Institute, and took part in the development of the first social policy educational programs.

Since 1989 she worked as an associate professor at the Social Policy and Social Work Department of the Institute for Sociology of ELTE University, Budapest, teaching among others communication skills development, mediation and organization development. From 1994 to 2002 she worked as the Director of Partners Hungary. The organization is a member of Partners for Democratic Change International an international network, with the goal of the education of the culture of creative conflict management, techniques of democracy, negotiation techniques and change management. Within this, Göncz worked on the establishment of centers for the prevention and management of social conflicts in Albania, Bulgaria, Romania and in the former Yugoslavia.

She lectured at several universities abroad since 1990. Between 1998 and 2003, she taught the Social Psychology of Prejudice at the Human Rights Department at the Central European University.

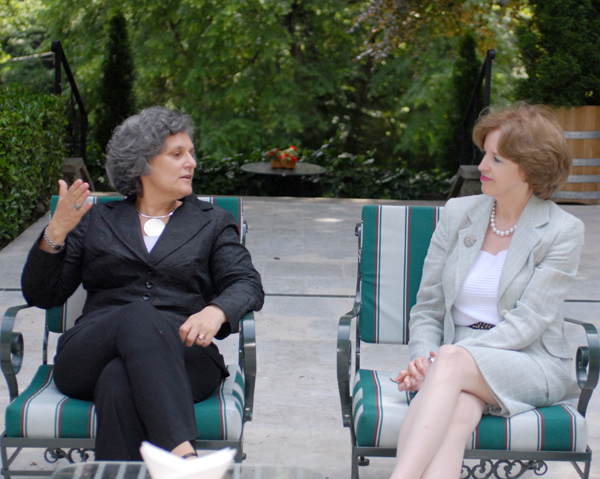
Kinga Göncz, Foreign Minister of Hungary (left) with April Foley, United States Ambassador to Hungary (right). Budapest, May 2008

== Political career ==
Göncz was appointed Political State Secretary of the Ministry for Health, Social and Family Affairs responsible for civil co-ordination in 2002. She was responsible for: the elaboration of the system of keeping contacts with state and non-governmental social policy related organizations, the professional leading of the work for the amendment of the law on social affairs, and the heading of the National Council on Aging and Older People, the Social Council, the National Council for the Issues of Disabled Persons and the Ministry's Tripartite Council for the Reconciliation of Interests.

From 2004 she served as Minister without portfolio for equal opportunities, responsible for disabled persons, Romanis, the equal opportunities of women and men, co-operation with NGOs, and for the co-ordination of the fight against poverty and segregation.

Between 2004 and 2006 she was the minister of youth, family, social affairs and equal opportunities in the first cabinet of Prime Minister Ferenc Gyurcsány. During her assignment at this position, she was responsible, besides the areas she managed as minister without portfolio for equal opportunities, for the heading of the welfare system, the system of family support, the area of caring for children and youth, the affairs of the elderly and pensions, the question of drugs, as well as consumer protection.

From 2006 to 2009 she served as minister of foreign affairs.

=== Member of the European Parliament ===
Göncz became a Member of the European Parliament following the 2009 European elections. A member of the Progressive Alliance of Socialists and Democrats group, she served as vice-chairwoman of the Committee on Civil Liberties, Justice and Home Affairs. Between 2010 and 2012, she was also a member of the Special Committee on the policy challenges and budgetary resources for a sustainable European Union after 2013.

In addition to her committee assignments, Göncz was a member of the parliament's delegation for relations with Albania, Bosnia and Herzegovina, Serbia, Montenegro and Kosovo.

== Life after politics ==
In November 2015, Göncz was appointed by United Nations Secretary-General Ban Ki-moon to the High-Level Panel on Access to Medicines, co-chaired by Ruth Dreifuss, former President of Switzerland, and Festus Mogae, former President of Botswana.

In addition, Göncz is on the Advisory Board Chair of Roma Programs for George Soros' Open Society Foundations.

== Personal life ==
Fluent in English and German, Göncz is married, the mother of two adult children, and the grandmother of four boys.

Political offices
Preceded by Ferenc Somogyi	Minister of Foreign Affairs; 2006–2009	Succeeded by Péter Balázs
