= Camille Wolff =

Luxembourgish tennis player

Personal information
- Nationality: Luxembourgish
- Born: 15 June 1894; Luxembourg, Luxembourg
- Died: 30 December 1977 (aged 83); Luxembourg, Luxembourg

Sport
- Sport: Tennis

Camille Wolff (15 June 1894 – 30 December 1977) was a Luxembourgish tennis player. He competed in the men's singles event at the 1924 Summer Olympics.
