= Boris Schildt =

Finnish tennis player

Personal information
- Nationality: Finnish
- Born: 13 December 1889; Pori, Grand Duchy of Finland
- Died: 25 January 1970 (aged 80); Helsinki, Finland

Sport
- Sport: Tennis

Boris Schildt (13 December 1889 – 25 January 1970) was a Finnish tennis player. He competed in the men's singles and doubles events at the 1924 Summer Olympics.
