= Ernst Schybergson =

Finnish tennis player (1891-1966)

Personal information
- Nationality: Finnish
- Born: 29 January 1891 Helsinki, Finland
- Died: 17 March 1966 (aged 75) Helsinki, Finland

Sport
- Sport: Tennis

Ernst Schybergson (29 January 1891 – 17 March 1966) was a Finnish tennis player. He competed in the men's singles and doubles events at the 1924 Summer Olympics.

He also played football as a forward. He made one appearance for the Finland national team in 1911.
