= Pantelis Papadopoulos =

Greek tennis player (1902–1987)

Personal information
- Nationality: Greek
- Born: 1902
- Died: 1987 (aged 84–85)

Sport
- Sport: Tennis

Pantelis Papadopoulos (1902–1987) was a Greek tennis player. He competed in the men's singles and doubles events at the 1924 Summer Olympics.
