= Asaji Honda =

Japanese tennis player

- Country (sports): Japan

Singles

Other tournaments
- Olympic Games: 1R (1924)

Doubles
- Olympic Games: 2R (1924)

Asaji Honda (本田 朝次, Honda Asaji) was a Japanese male tennis player who represented Japan in the Olympic Games. He competed in the singles event at the 1924 Summer Olympics, losing in the first round to Jean Borotra. With compatriot Masanosuke Fukuda he competed in the men's doubles event and reached the second round. In 1922 he won the singles title at the Singapore Championships.
