= Runar Granholm =

Finnish tennis player

Personal information
- Nationality: Finnish
- Born: 25 July 1889; Helsinki, Finland
- Died: 3 November 1937 (aged 48); Helsinki, Finland

Sport
- Sport: Tennis

Runar Granholm (25 July 1889 – 3 November 1937) was a Finnish tennis player. He competed in the men's singles and doubles events at the 1924 Summer Olympics.
