= Ronaldo Boyd =

Argentine tennis player (1904–1978)

- Full name: Ronaldo Reid Boyd
- Country (sports): Argentina
- Born: 15 August 1904 Belgrano, Buenos Aires, Argentina
- Died: 1978 (aged 73–74) Buenos Aires, Argentina
- Turned pro: 1920 (amateur tour)
- Retired: 1939

Singles
- Career record: 73–47
- Career titles: 16

Grand Slam singles results
- French Open: QF (1928)
- Wimbledon: 4R (1928)

Grand Slam doubles results
- Wimbledon: QF (1928)

Ronaldo Reid Boyd (15 August 1904 – 1978) was an Argentine tennis player. He was a quarter finalist in singles at the 1928 French Championships and a quarter finalist in the men's doubles at the 1928 Wimbledon Championships. He was active from 1920 to 1939 and contested 19 career single finals winning 16 titles.

== Career ==
Ronald Reid Boyd was born on 15 August 1904 in Belgrano, Buenos Aires, Argentina. He was descended from Scottish immigrants to Argentina in 19th century. He was a member of the prestigious Belgrano Athletic Club tennis section. He played his first tournament at the Le Touquet International Championship in 1920 where he reached the final and lost to Joseph Thellier de Poncheville. In 1921 he won his first singles title at the City of Buenos Aires Championships against Enrique Obarrio. In 1928 at the Wimbledon Championships he reached the fourth round before losing to Henri Cochet in straight sets. In 1937 he won his final singles title at the Argentina Grass Court Championships against Alejo Russell. In 1939 he played his final singles tournament at the Argentina Grass Court Championships where he reached the final and lost to Adriano Zappa.

His other career singles highlights include winning the City of Buenos Aires Championships a further four times (1922–23, 1926, 1930), the Argentina Grass Court Championships another four times (1928–30, 1937), the Argentina International Championships two times (1928, 1931), the River Plate Championships two times (1927, 1929), the Argentina Closed Championships (1928), and the South American Championships (1927). In addition he was also a finalist at the East of England Championships (1926) and the Bordeaux International Championships (1928).

He was also member of the Argentina Davis Cup team in 1923, 1928 and 1931. In 1948 after he retired from competitive tennis he became a founding member of the International Lawn Tennis Club of Argentina.
