= Masanosuke Fukuda =

Japanese tennis player (1897–1974)

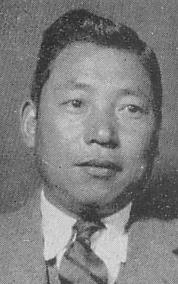
- Country (sports): Japan
- Born: 4 May 1897; Tokyo, Japan
- Died: 22 December 1974 (aged 77)

Singles

Grand Slam singles results
- Wimbledon: 3R (1924)

Other tournaments
- Olympic Games: 4R (1924)

Doubles

Grand Slam doubles results
- Wimbledon: 2R (1924)
- Olympic Games: 2R (1924)

Masanosuke Fukuda (福田 雅之助, Fukuda Masanosuke, 4 May 1897 – 22 December 1974) was a Japanese male tennis player who represented Japan in the Davis Cup and Olympic Games. He competed in the singles event at the 1924 Summer Olympics, reaching the fourth round in which he lost to Henri Cochet. With compatriot Asaji Honda he competed in the men's doubles event and reached the second round. In 1923 he won the Orange Invitation tournament against Frank Anderson.

He competed in the 1924 Wimbledon Championships and reached the third round in the singles event and the second round in the doubles.
