= Maurice Ferrier =

Swiss tennis player

- Ferrier in 1926

Personal information
- Nationality: Swiss
- Born: 8 November 1901 Geneva, Switzerland
- Died: 9 September 1973 (aged 71) Geneva, Switzerland

Sport
- Sport: Tennis

Maurice Ferrier (8 November 1901 – 9 September 1973) was a Swiss tennis player. He competed in the men's singles and doubles events at the 1924 Summer Olympics.
