= Alexandru Roman (tennis) =

Romanian tennis player

Personal information
- Nationality: Romanian
- Born: 1895

Sport
- Sport: Tennis

Alexandru Roman (born 1895, date of death unknown) was a Romanian tennis player. He competed in the men's singles and doubles events at the 1924 Summer Olympics.
