= Jack Nielsen (skier) =

Norwegian alpine skier (1923–2020)

Jack Troye Nielsen (7 October 1923 – 8 May 2020) was a Norwegian alpine skier.

Nielsen was born in Oslo in October 1923, and was the son of Jack Nielsen. He represented the club IL Heming. He participated at the 1948 Winter Olympics in Saint Moritz, where he competed in slalom. Nielsen won the slalom event at the Norwegian championships in 1950.

He died in Switzerland in May 2020, at the age of 96.
