= Américo Cattaruzza =

Argentine tennis player

- Full name: Héctor Américo Cattaruzza
- Country (sports): Argentina
- Born: 25 August 1904
- Died: 23 July 1989 (aged 84)
- Turned pro: 1924 (amateur tour)
- Retired: 1951

Singles
- Career titles: 6

Grand Slam singles results
- French Open: 3R (1928)
- Wimbledon: 3R (1926)

Héctor Américo Cattaruzza (25 August 1904 – 23 July 1989) was an Argentine tennis player. He competed in the men's singles and doubles events at the 1924 Summer Olympics.
