= Đorđe Dunđerski =

Yugoslav tennis player

- Country (sports): Yugoslavia
- Born: 1902 Srbobran, Austria-Hungary
- Died: 1983 (aged 80–81) Futog, SFR Yugoslavia
- Turned pro: 1924 (amateur tour)
- Retired: 1928

Singles

Grand Slam singles results
- French Open: 3R (1926)
- Wimbledon: 1R (1926)

Other tournaments
- Olympic Games: 1R (1924)

Doubles
- Career record: 2R (1924 Olympic Games)

Team competitions
- Davis Cup: 2R^{Eu} (1927)

Đorđe Dunđerski (Serbian Cyrillic: Ђорђе Дунђерски [dʑôːrdʑe dundʑěrskiː]; 1902–1983) was a Yugoslav tennis player. He was the first to play for the Yugoslavian team at the International Lawn Tennis Challenge, and later the Davis Cup in 1927. He was also the first and only Yugoslavian tennis Olympian until the reinstatement of tennis to the Olympic programme in 1988. Apart from that he was a three-time Swiss champion.

== Early life and family ==
Đorđe Dunđerski, better known by the nickname Goga, belonged to the prestigious Serbian family of Dunđerski, the roots of which go far back to Herzegovina from where his ancestors moved to Srbobran in the 17th century, fleeing from the Ottoman occupation. The most prominent members of the Dunđerski family lived in Vojvodina before the First World War, and up to the Second World War occupied important positions in small businesses.

Dunđerski was born in 1902 in Srbobran to father Jaša and mother Vera, the latter being the daughter of a lawyer in Novi Sad a town to which they had moved in 1907. The young Dungyersky was well educated and spoke French better than his mother tongue; he spoke Serbian with a French accent. For high school, he attended the Dugonics András Piarista Gimnázium in Szeged to learn Latin and Hungarian. To avoid conflicts in the First World War, the family escaped to Geneva where he graduated in 1922. It was in Switzerland where he began playing tennis, becoming a high school champion. The family returned to Novi Sad immediately after the war. Dungyersky embarked on law studies at the University of Zagreb, but left during the second semester to focus on tennis.

== Tennis career ==
Dunđerski 's first breakthrough achievement was winning the Geneve International Championships. After that he became the best non-national player in Switzerland and held the Swiss International Championships consecutively between 1924 and 1927. During this period he played for the national team of Switzerland. He played occasionally in his home country and was a member of the HAŠK, the Croatian Academic Sports Club. He participated in the 1924 Summer Olympics in Paris where he lost to John Gilbert in the first round. In doubles, he and Iván Balás advanced to the second round but lost to Jacques Brugnon/Henri Cochet (France).

In 1925, he was a finalist at the Campel doubles tournament partnering Jean Wuarin but came short against Jean Borotra and his Swiss partner, a man named Kyburz. In 1926, he was a runner-up at the Nice L.T.C. tournament, only losing to Umberto de Morpurgo in straight sets. He participated in the first official Davis Cup match in 1927, teaming up with Balás from Bečkerek to represent the Kingdom of Yugoslavia Davis Cup team in Zagreb against India.

== Personal life ==
After retiring from tennis, Dunđerski became a tennis instructor in Geneva, and acted as sparring partner to many famous diplomats including Arthur Balfour. In 1939 he returned to Novi Sad but was never able to enter elite society because he was considered a foreigner and an extravagant person, although he had inherited a large estate from his father and thus had the status of a landowner. After World War II he was stripped of all of his assets in Srbobran by the Socialist Federal Republic of Yugoslavia. He could not get a job as he had done no work apart from playing tennis full-time. He was only permitted occasional access to tennis clubs in exchange for his part-time assistance to the Tennis Association when it needed to tap on his ability to speak, write and read in five languages as an international liaison.

Dunđerski married in 1951 but divorced in 1969. He supported himself by selling parts of his estate until the remainder was nationalized. He was permitted to keep two apartments and lived in them until he sold them, whereupon he became homeless. He moved from town to town, finding shelter in the homes of old friends. Eventually, his social security expired and he died in a poorhouse in Futog in 1983.

== See also ==
- Dunđerski Palace (Čelarevo)
- Fantast Castle

== Works cited ==
=== Primary ===
- Šoškić, Čedomir (2012). Тениски савез Србије Тенис без граници 1922–2012 [Tennis Association of Serbia, Tennis without Borders 1922–2012] (PDF) (in Serbian). Belgrade, Serbia: Tennis Association of Serbia. pp. 250–251.

=== Secondary ===
- François Coty, ed. (December 7, 1925). "Tennis". Le Figaro (in French) (341). Paris: Dassault Group: 4. ISSN 0182-5852.
- François Coty, ed. (February 9, 1926). "Tennis". Le Figaro (in French) (40). Paris: Dassault Group: 6. ISSN 0182-5852.
