= Roy Debran =

American baseball player

- Outfielder

Negro league baseball debut
- 1940, for the New York Black Yankees

Last appearance
- 1940, for the New York Black Yankees

Teams
- New York Black Yankees (1940)

Roy Debran is an American former Negro league outfielder who played in the 1940s.

Debran played for the New York Black Yankees in 1943. In three recorded games, he posted three hits in 12 plate appearances.
