= Pablo Debran =

Swiss tennis player

Personal information
- Nationality: Swiss
- Born: 23 February 1899
- Died: 4 December 1969 (aged 70)

Sport
- Sport: Tennis

Pablo Debran (23 February 1899 – 4 December 1969) was a Swiss tennis player. He competed in the men's singles and doubles events at the 1924 Summer Olympics.
