= Pavel Macenauer =

Czech tennis player (1900–1955)

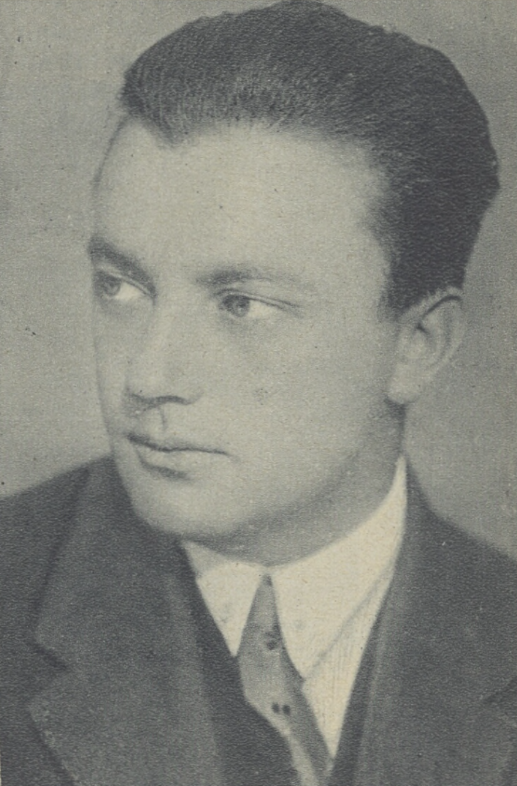
- Pavel Macenauer in 1927
- Country (sports): Czechoslovakia
- Born: 24 April 1901; Úlice, Austria-Hungary
- Died: 30 July 1955 (aged 54); Plzeň, Czechoslovakia

Pavel Macenauer (24 April 1901 – 30 July 1955) was a Czech tennis player. He competed in the men's singles event at the 1924 Summer Olympics.
