= Augustos Zerlendis =

Greek tennis player

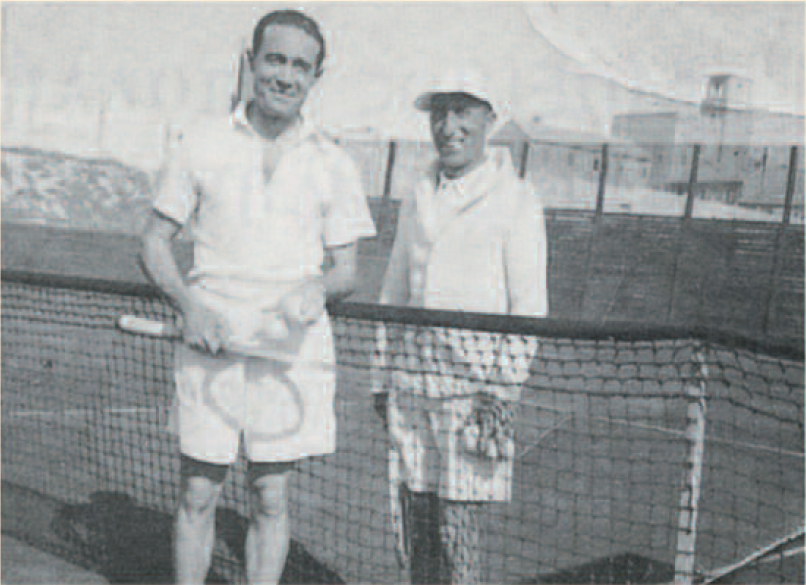
- Zerlendis (left) with Davis Cup partner Max Balli
- Country (sports): Greece
- Born: 5 November 1886^{[a]} Khedivate of Egypt
- Died: 1954 (aged 67–68)
- Turned pro: 1905 (amateur tour)
- Retired: 1947

Singles

Grand Slam singles results
- French Open: 2R (1925, 1928)
- Wimbledon: 4R (1920)

Other tournaments
- WHCC: 1R (1922)
- Olympic Games: 3R (1924)

Doubles

Grand Slam doubles results
- Wimbledon: 2R (1920)

Other doubles tournaments
- Olympic Games: 3R (1924)

Mixed doubles

Grand Slam mixed doubles results
- Wimbledon: 2R (1922)

Other mixed doubles tournaments
- Olympic Games: 2R (1924)

Augustos Zerlendis sometimes spelled Avgoustos Zerlentis (Greek: Αύγουστος Ζερλέντης Greek pronunciation: [ˈav.ɣu.stɔs zeɾˈlenˈtis]]; 5 November 1886 – 1954) was a Greek tennis player who competed at the 1920 Olympic Games in Antwerp. He reached the fourth round of the 1920 Wimbledon Championships singles competition. Between 1927 and 1931, he played in seven ties for the Greek Davis Cup team.

== Early life and family ==
Augustus Zerlentis' family originated from Chios, but he was born in Egypt, where his parents had moved in 1886. He was born to George Zerlendi and Leonora Eleni Agelasto. He started tennis at age 19 in 1905. In World War I he served in the British Red Cross and St. John of Jerusalem within the British forces.

== Tennis career ==
In 1911, Zerlendis toured Switzerland to attend matches in different cities. Around that time, he happened to meet the United States champion R. Norris Williams, whose playing technique had a big impact and influence on his later style. In 1913, he won the International Championships of Alexandria against French player H.J. Pailhé, and the next year, he won the International Championships of Egypt, a title he retained for many years. He joined the Athens Lawn Tennis Club in 1923. He went on to claim three singles championships of Greece (1928, 1929, 1931) and two additional titles (men's doubles in 1928 and 1929, and mixed doubles in 1928). In 1932, he was ranked second on the Greek rankings.

He represented his country in the Davis Cup (1927, 1928, 1929, 1930, 1931), the Balkan Games in 1930 and 1931 and in the Olympics in 1924 and 1920, the latter in which his first round elimination by Francis Lowe still holds the longest Olympic match record with its 76 game^{[b]}. Prior to his Davis Cup enlistment in 1926 he was drafted into a meeting between Greece and Czechoslovakia and won the first two rubbers in singles and second in men's doubles. In 1928, in a mixed team match against Hungary in Budapest, the Greek troupe was whitewashed by the host nation. Zerlendis was defeated in both doubles and mixed doubles. It was the second consecutive loss of Greece to Hungary in the second straight year. More involvement in team events came at the challenge between Vienna and Athens in 1928, at the meetings between the Union Sportive Française d'Alexandrie and Tewfikief Tennis Club of Cairo (1932, 1935, 1936, 1938, 1939), at a meeting between the All Egypt Club and Milano L.C.T. in 1932, at the Games of Y.M.C.A. in 1936, at the Games of New Sports Club of Alexandria in 1936, at the Games of Smouha Club Alexandria, in the last he won the third place in 1938.

His international individual accomplishments include the Championship of the Eastern Mediterranean eight titles (singles 1925, 1926, 1929, 1930/men's doubles 1925/mixed doubles 1925, 1926, 1929). At the International Championships in Cairo he was crowned four times, first a double victory in 1924 at the Gezira Sporting Club in single and mixed doubles then a doubles victory in 1931 to come full circle and exactly a decade later of his first a repeated singles triumph in 1934. He participated in the Championship of Cairo in 1935 and the Egyptian Championships on multiple occasions (1931, 1933, 1934, 1935, 1938, 1940). Moreover, he competed in the Egyptian International Championships (1939), International Championships of Alexandria (1934, 1936, 1937, 1938) and the Championship of Alexandria (1934). Among the numerous trophies he held were the Championship of Thessaloniki in 1929 and the Greek Autumn Championship.

He died in 1954 at age 68.

=== Playing style ===
Eventual world number one Bill Tilden described Zerlendis in 1921 as "[...] a baseliner of the most pronounced type. He gets everything he can put his racquet to. He reminds me irresistibly of Mavrogordato, seemingly reaching nothing, yet they all come back. I cannot adequately analyse his game because his first principle is to put back the ball no matter how, and this he carries into excellent effect. Zerlendi is a match winner first and a stylist second."

== Notes ==
- ^{a} However, his Swiss immigration record gives 1887 as his birth year.
- ^{b} The score was 14–12, 8–10, 5–7, 6–4, 6–4 to Lowe, and the match duration was between five and a half and six hours.

== Works cited ==
=== Books ===
- Bott, Caroline (2010). The Life and Works of Alfred Bestall: Illustrator of Rupert Bear. London, United Kingdom: Bloomsbury Publishing. ISBN 9781408814062.
- Tilden, Bill (1921). "Chapter XV. Spain and the Continent". The art of lawn tennis. London, United Kingdom: Methuen & Co. ISBN 1421900106.

=== Documents ===
- "Überseeische Auswanderungen Im Jahre" [Overseas Emigration in years] (jpg). Swiss immigration record. Nationalarchiven der Schweiz. 1923.
- "Überseeische Auswanderungen Im Jahre" [Overseas Emigration in years] (jpg). Swiss immigration record. Nationalarchiven der Schweiz. 1923.
- "British Army WWI Medal Rolls Index Cards" (jpg). UK Army Medal Office. 1916.

=== Online media ===
- "Augustos Zerlendi". The Championships, Wimbledon. All England Lawn Tennis and Croquet Club.
- "Tsonga venció a Raonic en 'maratón'" [Tsonga beat Raonic in 'marathon']. espn.co.uk (in Spanish). Bristol, Connecticut, United States: ESPNdeportes. 31 July 2012.

=== Periodicals ===
- "Αύγουστος Ζερλέντης, ο πρωτοτενιστής" [August Zerlentis the prototype of tennis]. Ladder (in Greek). 22 (131). Athens, Greece: Athens Lawn Tennis Club: 13. October 2010. Archived from the original (PDF) on 4 March 2016.
- Béla Kehrling, ed. (22 April 1932). "Külföldi hírek" [International news] (PDF). Tennisz és Golf (in Hungarian). IV (3). Budapest, Hungary: Kő-, Könyvnyomda, Könyv- és Lapkiadó Rt: 56.
- "5:0-ra vertük a görögöket a nemzetközi teniszmérkőzésen" [we beat the Greeks 5:0 in international tennis match] (in Hungarian). Budapest, Hungary: Huszadik Század. April 1928.
- Julien Pichené (18 July 2012). Frédéric Schmitt (ed.). "Jeux Olympiques 2012" [Olympic Games 2012] (PDF). Journal du Tennis (in French). Boulogne-sur-Mer, France: Roularta Printing SA: 13.
