= Kálmán Kirchmayer =

Hungarian tennis player (1897–1990)

Personal information
- Nationality: Hungarian
- Born: 15 November 1897 Rzeszów, Austria-Hungary
- Died: 6 November 1990 (aged 92) Budapest, Hungary

Sport
- Sport: Tennis

Kálmán Kirchmayer (15 November 1897 – 6 November 1990) was a Hungarian tennis player. He competed in the men's singles and doubles events at the 1924 Summer Olympics.
