= Jack Nielsen (tennis) =

Norwegian tennis player

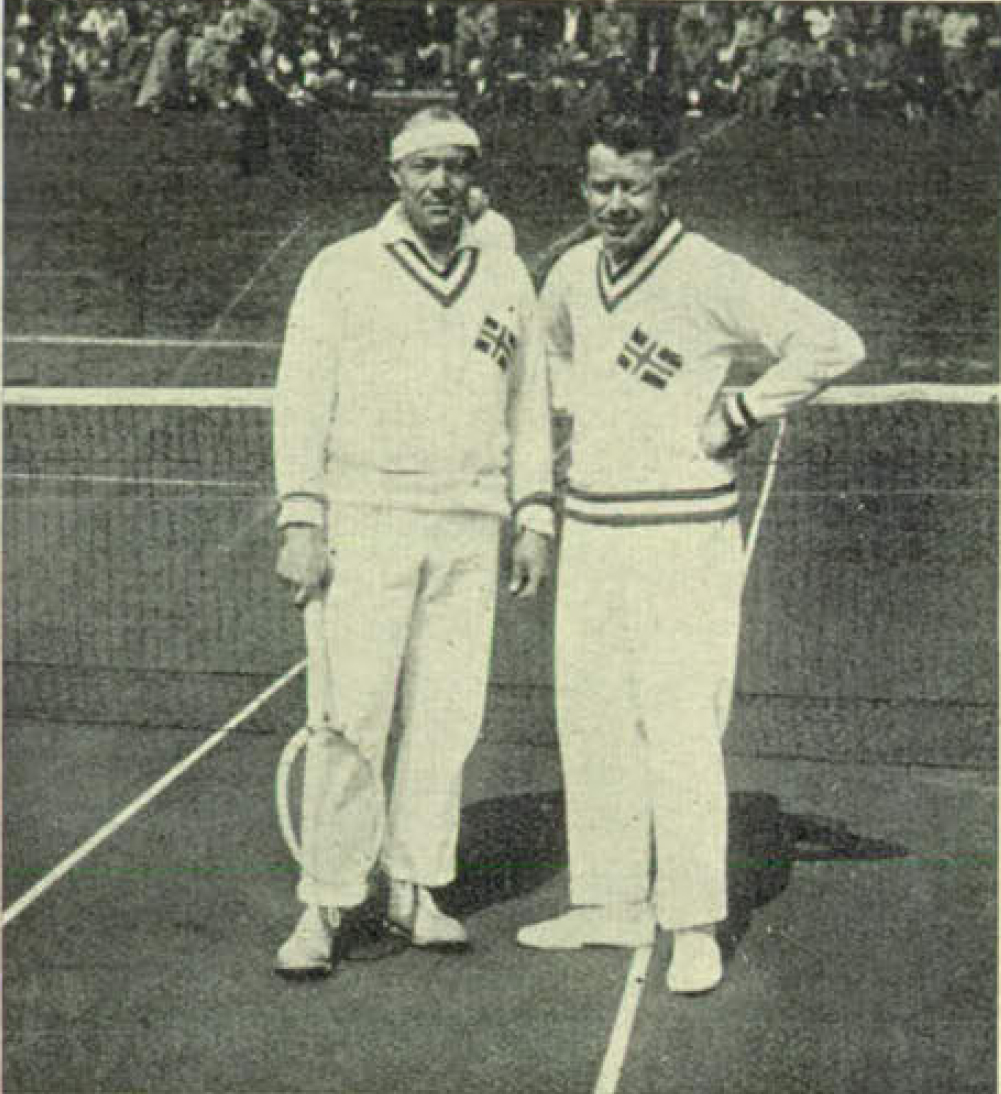
- Torleif Torkildsen (left) and Jack Nielsen (right) in the 1929 Davis Cup Tie against Hungary in Oslo
- Country (sports): Norway
- Born: 3 August 1896 Egersund
- Died: 9 January 1981 (aged 84)
- Plays: Right-handed

Singles

Grand Slam singles results
- French Open: 2R (1929, 1930)
- Olympic Games: 3R (1924)

Doubles

Grand Slam doubles results
- French Open: 2R (1929)
- Olympic Games: QF (1920)

Mixed doubles

Grand Slam mixed doubles results
- French Open: 2R (1930)
- Olympic Games: 2R (1924)

Team competitions
- Davis Cup: 2R (Europe) (1930, 1931)
- Last updated on: 21 February 2013.

Jack Fridtjof Charles Hücke Coucheron Nobel Nielsen (Norwegian pronunciation: [ˈnɪ̀lsn̩]; 3 August 1896 – 9 January 1981) was a Norwegian tennis player. He was a six-time national tennis champion of Norway.

== Biography ==
He was born in Egersund to Peter Godtfried Albert Nielsen, a customs chief officer, and Karen Andrea Coucheron Aamodt. He married Anne-Sofie Troye, daughter of a school principal in Trondheim. He was the father of skier Jack Nielsen.

Nielsen graduated as a chemical engineer from the Dresden University of Technology in 1917. In 1921, he earned his doctorate in the Karlsruhe Institute of Technology on Hydrogenation. In 1924, he worked as a brewmaster in Copenhagen. In 1918-19, he became a chemist in the Aktieselskab Northern Chromate Industrial. In 1922-31, he was employed by the Christiania Aktie Ølbryggeri, Oslo's main beer brewery, where he was promoted to head distiller. Between 1932 and 1946, he switched to Nora Industrier in Oslo; in 1946, he moved to the Trondheim subsidiary, where he lived and worked as the administrative director until 1962 and as the managing director until 1965. He finished the last year of his civil career at the E. C. Dahls Brewery from where he retired in 1966. Apart from serving as president of several regional and national brewer labor unions and mineral water distributors, he was also president of the Norwegian Tennis Federation and the Oslo Tennis Club for several years. He also filled in for the governor seat of the Rotary International between 1963 and 1964.

== Tennis career ==
Nielsen participated at the 1920 Summer Olympics, where he placed fifth in doubles together with Conrad Langaard. He also competed at the 1924 Summer Olympics. He was a six-time national tennis champion of Norway. In the Davis Cup he never won a single match. In 1922 he was a runner-up for the mixed title of the Hotel Métropole Cup of Cannes alongside Madeline O'Neill of Great Britain but eventually lost to the French duo of Suzanne Lenglen and Jean Borotra. In 1930 he clinched the mixed doubles with his Danish partner Else Støckel of the Western Germany Championships at Krefeld by overcoming the couple of Ody Koopman and his wife.
