= Marcel Cousin =

French tennis player

Personal information
- Nationality: French
- Born: 4 August 1896
- Died: 1 August 1968 (aged 71)

Sport
- Sport: Tennis

Marcel Cousin (4 August 1896 – 1 August 1968) was a French tennis player. He competed in the men's singles event at the 1924 Summer Olympics.
