= Stéphane Halot =

Belgian tennis player

Personal information
- Full name: Stéphane Jules Jacques Auguste Marie Halot
- Nationality: Belgian
- Born: 1 November 1897 Brussels, Belgium

Sport
- Sport: Tennis

Stéphane Jules Jacques Auguste Marie Halot (1 November 1897 – ) was a Belgian diplomat and tennis player. He competed at the 1920 Summer Olympics and the 1924 Summer Olympics.

Halot was educated at Saint-Louis University, Brussels. He entered the diplomatic corps in 1920. He had postings as secretary in Prague (1920–21); Berlin (1923–27), and Paris (1928–36); as Consul (1936) and Consul-General in Prague (1939-40); and Minister to Turkey (1945-51), and was appointed Ambassador to India in 1951.
