= Republic of China at the 1924 Summer Olympics =

- Flag of the Republic of China
- IOC code: ROC (Chine used at these Games)
- NOC: Chinese Olympic Committee (Note: See Chinese Olympic Committee#Timeline concerning Olympic recognition and Chinese Taipei Olympic Committee#History.)

in Paris
- Competitors: 4 in 1 sport
- Medals: Gold 0 Silver 0 Bronze 0 Total 0

Summer Olympics appearances (overview)
- 1924; 1928; 1932; 1936; 1948

Other related appearances
- China (1952–pres.); Chinese Taipei (1956–pres.)

China, as the Republic of China, attended the Summer Olympic Games for the first time at the 1924 Summer Olympics in Paris, France. Far Eastern Games Chinese Competition Committee sent 4 tennis players, Khoo Hooi-Hye, Ng Sze-Kwang, Wei Wing-Lock, and Wu Sze-Cheung to sign up for the tennis competition, with Wei Wing-Lock being the team's captain. The delegation even attended the opening ceremony, but later withdrew from the tennis competition. Nevertheless, this is the first appearance of Chinese people at an Olympic venue.

== Tennis ==
The following players:

- No. 50 S.-K. Ng, also known as Ng Sze-Kwang (traditional Chinese: 吳仕光; simplified Chinese: 吴仕光)
- No. 19 W.-L. Wei, also known as Wei Wing-Lock(traditional Chinese: 韋榮洛; simplified Chinese: 韦荣洛)
- No. 64 H.-H. Khoo, also known as Khoo Hooi-Hye (traditional Chinese: 邱飛海; simplified Chinese: 邱飞海)
- No. 39 S.-C. Wu, also known as Wu Sze-Cheung (traditional Chinese: 吳仕章; simplified Chinese: 吴仕章)

attended the opening ceremony and signed up for men's singles and men's doubles tennis, but all withdrew from the competition after the opening ceremony, recorded as forfait général.
