= Otto Salm =

Austrian count and tennis player (1886–1941)

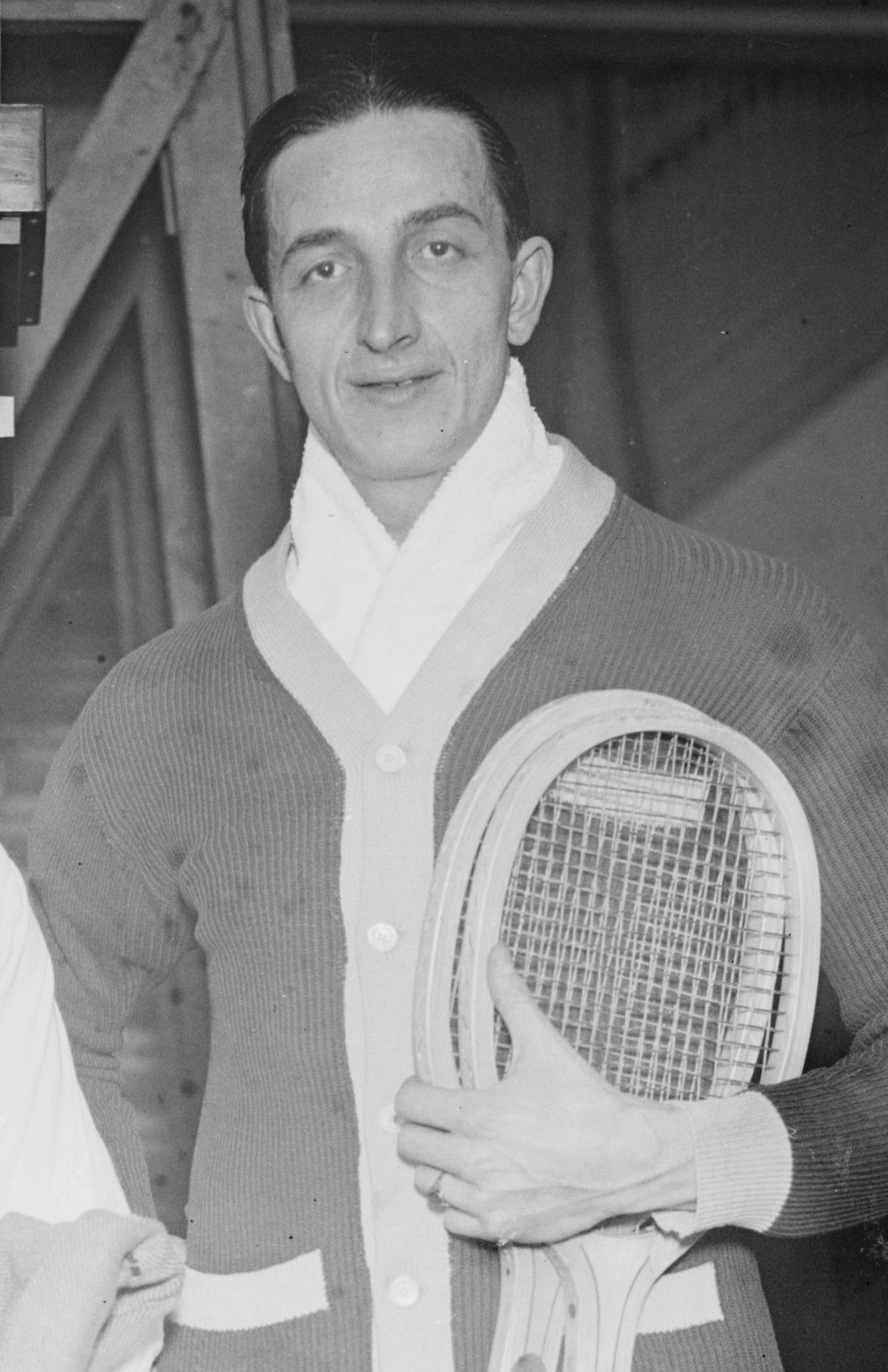
- Full name: Henry Alexander Graf von Salm-Hoogstraeten
- Country (sports): Austria-Hungary
- Born: 25 August 1886
- Died: 20 July 1941 (aged 54)

Grand Slam singles results
- US Open: 1R (1916, 1917)

Henry Alexander Graf von Salm-Hoogstraeten (25 August 1886 – 20 July 1941), known as Otto Salm, was an Austrian count and amateur tennis player.

== Biography ==
The member of a Lotharingian noble family, Salm was the second born son of Prussian cavalry officer Count Alfred von Salm-Hoogstraeten and Baroness Adolphine von Erlanger.

Salm was based in the United States during World War I and competed on the local tennis circuit. He lost to Bill Tilden in the first round of the 1917 U.S. National Championships. By the 1920s, Salm was living on an estate in Hungary. He represented the Austria Davis Cup team in 1924, playing doubles with his brother Ludwig against Switzerland.

Salm married Maud Coster, daughter of financier Charles H. Coster, and had two children (Alexander and Louise). He was known to be residing in Rapallo, Italy, at the time of his death in 1941.

== See also ==
- List of Austria Davis Cup team representatives
