= Maas van der Feen =

Dutch tennis player

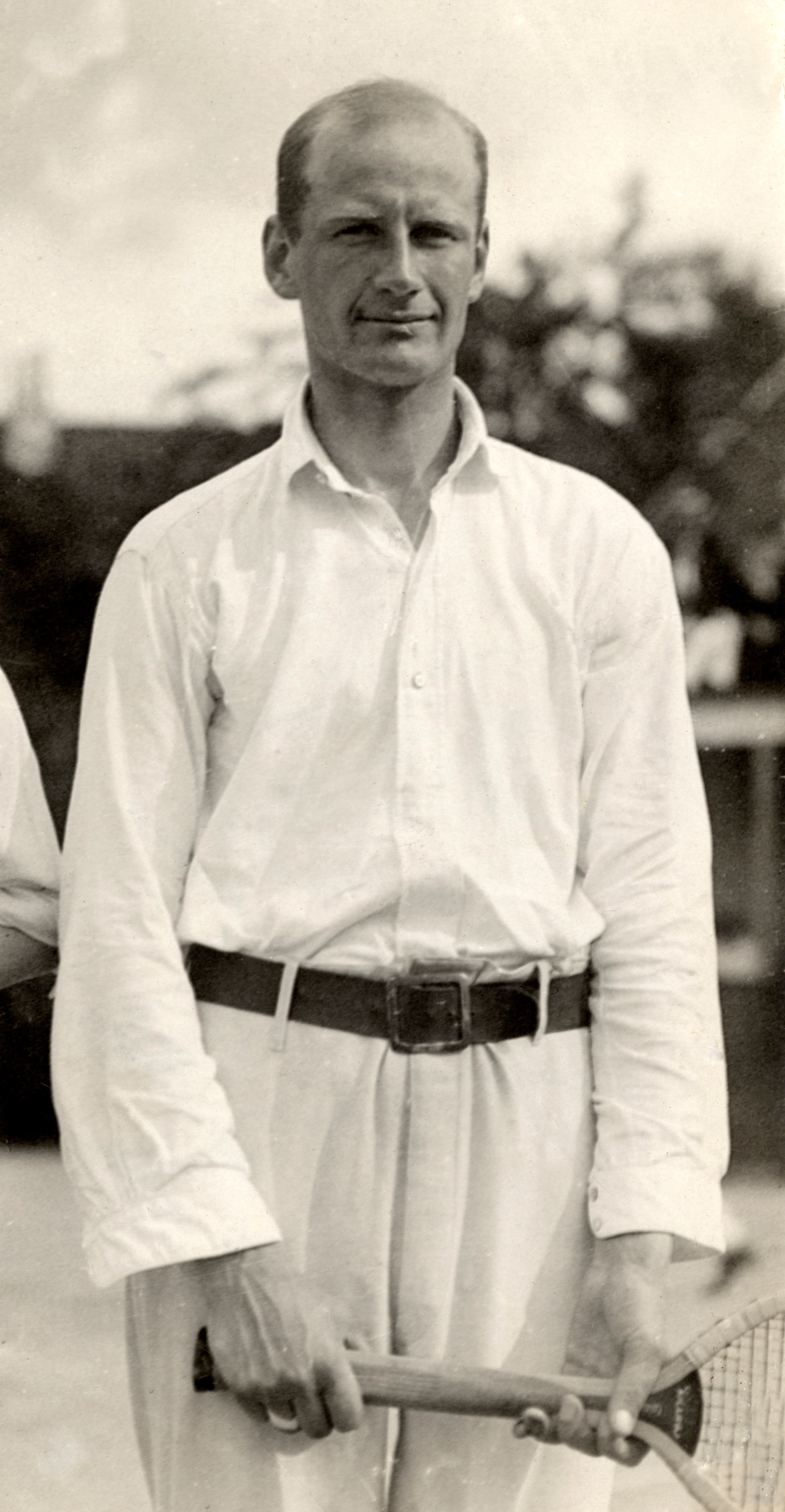
- Van der Feen in 1918
- Born: 1 February 1888 Smallingerland, Netherlands
- Died: 10 March 1973 (aged 85) The Hague, Netherlands

Maas van der Feen (1 February 1888 – 10 March 1973) was a Dutch tennis player. He competed in the men's singles and doubles events at the 1924 Summer Olympics.
