= Carlos Dumas =

Argentine tennis player

Personal information
- Nationality: Argentine
- Born: 1904

Sport
- Sport: Tennis

Carlos Dumas (born 1904, date of death unknown) was an Argentine tennis player. He competed in the men's singles and doubles events at the 1924 Summer Olympics.
