= Einar Bache =

Danish tennis player

Personal information
- Nationality: Danish
- Born: 23 September 1897; Frederiksberg, Denmark
- Died: 24 June 1976 (aged 78); Gentofte, Denmark

Sport
- Sport: Tennis

Einar Bache (23 September 1897 – 24 June 1976) was a Danish tennis player. He competed in the men's singles and doubles events at the 1924 Summer Olympics.
