= Domingo Torralva =

Chilean tennis player

- Country (sports): Chile
- Born: 20 January 1900 Santiago, Chile

Domingo Torralva (born 20 January 1900, date of death unknown) was a Chilean tennis player. He competed in the men's singles and doubles events at the 1924 Summer Olympics. In 1928 and 1929 he was a member of the Chilean Davis Cup team.
