= Guillermo Robson =

Argentine tennis player

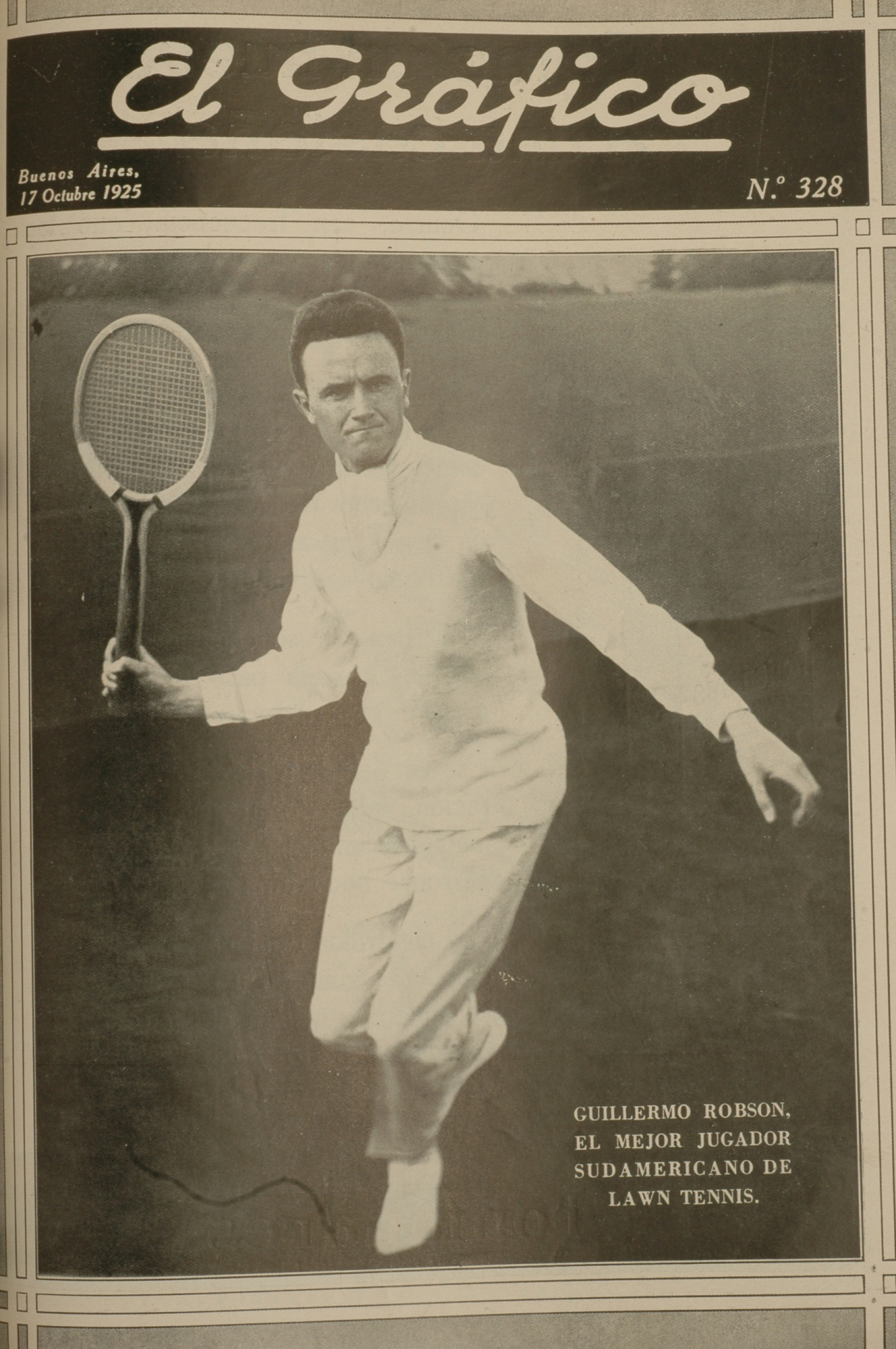
- Guillermo Robson in 1925
- Country (sports): Argentina
- Born: 25 June 1903; Buenos Aires, Argentina
- Died: 6 November 1972 (aged 69); Buenos Aires, Argentina

Guillermo Robson (25 June 1903 – 6 November 1972) was an Argentine tennis player. He competed in the men's singles and doubles events at the 1924 Summer Olympics.
