= Luis Torralva =

Chilean tennis player

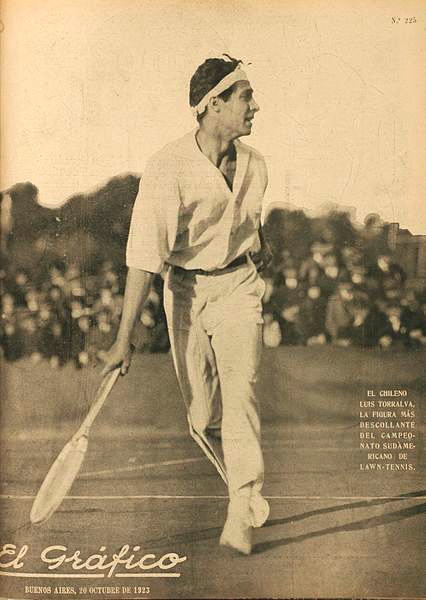
- Luis Torralva in 1923
- Country (sports): Chile
- Born: 13 March 1902
- Died: 20 May 1985 (aged 83)

Luis Torralva (13 March 1902 – 20 May 1985) was a Chilean tennis player. He competed in the men's singles and doubles events at the 1924 Summer Olympics.
