= Arturo Hortal =

Argentine tennis player

Personal information
- Nationality: Argentine
- Born: 24 April 1900

Sport
- Sport: Tennis

Arturo Hortal (born 24 April 1900, date of death unknown) was an Argentine tennis player. He competed in the men's singles event at the 1924 Summer Olympics. He was an architect by profession.
