= Bjørn Thalbitzer =

Danish tennis player

Personal information
- Nationality: Danish
- Born: 13 December 1895; Frederiksberg, Denmark
- Died: 31 March 1969 (aged 73); Sanremo, Italy

Sport
- Sport: Tennis

Bjørn Thalbitzer (13 December 1895 – 31 March 1969) was a Danish tennis player. He competed in the men's singles and doubles events at the 1924 Summer Olympics.
