= Jan Koželuh =

Czech tennis player (1904–1979)

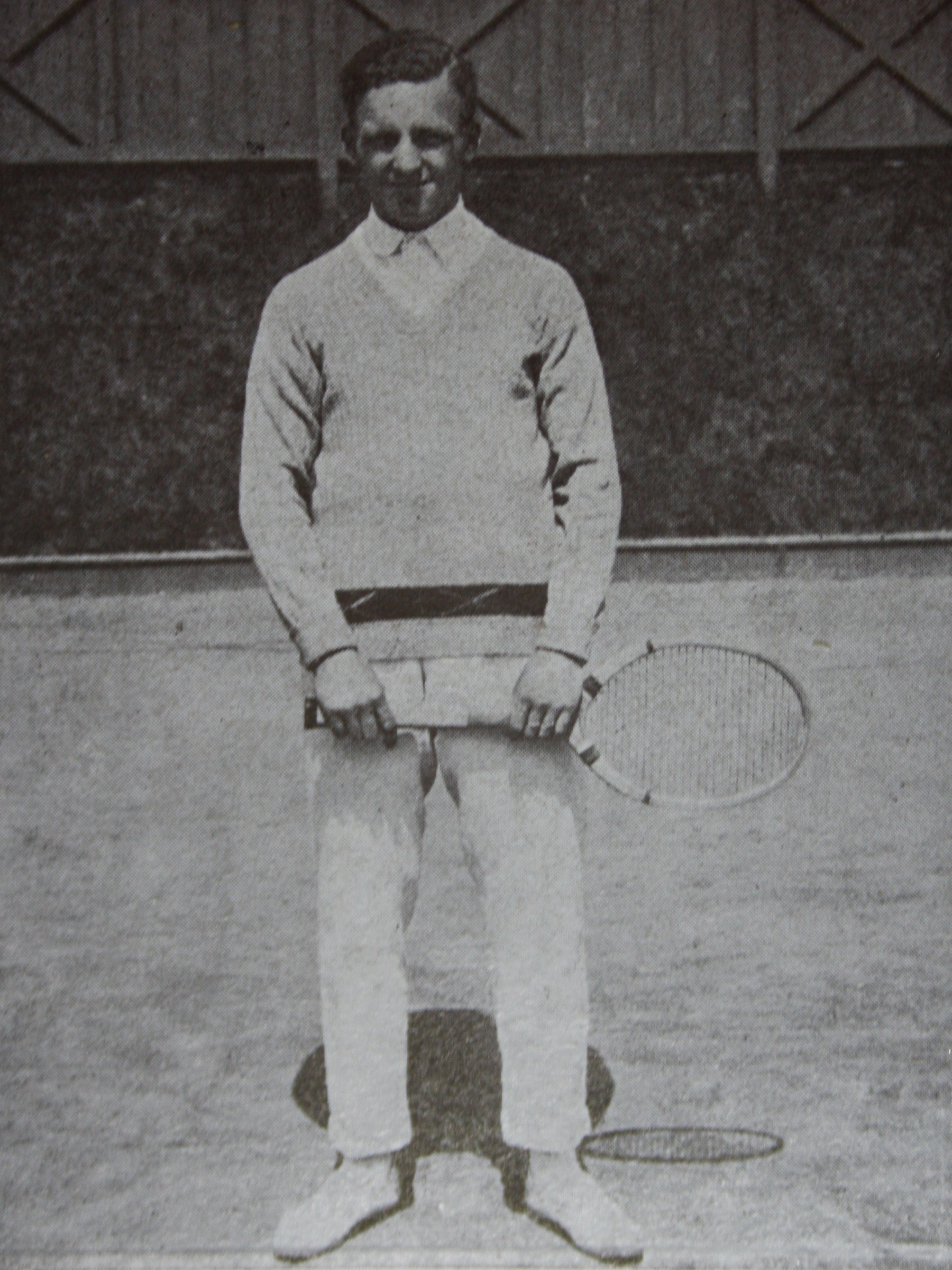
- Country (sports): Czechoslovakia
- Born: 29 January 1904 Prague, Austria-Hungary
- Died: 4 June 1979 (aged 75) Fort Lauderdale, Florida, US
- Turned pro: 1938 (amateur tour from 1923)
- Retired: 1945
- Plays: Right-handed (one-handed backhand)

Singles
- Career titles: 41
- Highest ranking: No. 10 (1927, A. Wallis Myers)

Grand Slam singles results
- French Open: 4R (1926)
- Wimbledon: QF (1926, 1927)

Jan Koželuh (29 January 1904 – 4 June 1979) was a Czech tennis player of the 1920s, not to be confused with his older brother Karel Koželuh (1895–1950), a player of the same era. Although Karel was inducted into the International Tennis Hall of Fame in Newport, Rhode Island, in 2006, Jan is almost totally forgotten today outside his native Czechoslovakia. He also competed at the 1924 Summer Olympics.

== Biography ==
Jan Koželuh was the son of Josef and Maria Koželuh, one of 7 brothers and two sisters. All six brothers and one sister were active in sports, a new phenomenon of that era. Karel, the most notable of the Koželuh family, achieved his fame as one of the first professional players in tennis, soccer, and field and ice hockey.

Jan, said by some to be the most talented of them all, remained an amateur throughout his career. He was the Czech national singles and doubles champion 1925-1928 as well as a quarter-finalist at Wimbledon in 1926 and 1927. He played many matches for the Czechoslovakia Davis Cup team 1924–1930. His highest world ranking was World No. 10 in 1927. Although Karel continued to play at a top level on the professional tennis circuit until he was in his forties, Jan ended his amateur career in the mid 1930s, which many considered a mistake. Afterwards, he lived in Florida, where he gave tennis lessons until his death.
