= 1926 World Table Tennis Championships – Men's team =

1926 Swaythling Cup (men's team)
- Location: London

The 1926 World Table Tennis Championships – Swaythling Cup (men's team) was the first edition of the men's team championship.

The cup was named the Swaythling Cup because it was named after the Dowager Lady Swaythling (the mother of Ivor Montagu) who presented the trophy to the English Table Tennis Association in 1926.

Hungary defeated Austria 5-4 in a play off for the gold medal following the fact that they tied with five wins each in the main competition. The winning team consisted of Roland Jacobi, Zoltán Mechlovits, Béla von Kehrling and Daniel Pecsi.

== Swaythling Cup results ==
| Team one | Team two | Score |
|---|---|---|
| Austria | Czechoslovakia | 7–2 |
| Austria | England | 4–5 |
| Austria | Germany | 9–0 |
| Austria | Hungary | 5–4 |
| Austria | India | 7–2 |
| Austria | Wales | 7–2 |
| Czechoslovakia | England | 0–9 |
| Czechoslovakia | Germany | 5–4 |
| Czechoslovakia | Hungary | 1–8 |
| Czechoslovakia | India | 2–7 |
| Czechoslovakia | Wales | 2–7 |
| England | Germany | 8–1 |
| England | Hungary | 2–7 |
| England | India | 4–5 |
| England | Wales | 5–4 |
| Germany | Hungary | 0–9 |
| Germany | India | 4–5 |
| Germany | Wales | 2–7 |
| Hungary | India | 8–1 |
| Hungary | Wales | 7–2 |
| Wales | India | 4–5 |

== Final table ==
| Pos | Team | P | W | L | Squad |
|---|---|---|---|---|---|
| 1 | Hungary | 6 | 5 | 1 | Roland Jacobi, Béla von Kehrling, Zoltán Mechlovits, Daniel Pecsi |
| 2 | Austria | 6 | 5 | 1 | Paul Flussmann, Eduard Freudenheim, Munio Pillinger |
| 3 | England | 6 | 4 | 2 | Charles Allwright, Bernard Bernstein, Percival Bromfield, Frank Burls, James Thompson |
| 3 | India | 6 | 4 | 2 | Athar-Ali Fyzee, Hassan Ali Fyzee, A.M. Peermahomed, B.C. Singh, S.R.G. Suppiah |
| 5 | Wales | 6 | 2 | 4 | Herbert Geen, Cyril Mossford, Hedley Penny, Solly Stone, C.F. Williams |
| 6 | Czechoslovakia | 6 | 1 | 5 | Bohumil Hájek, Jaroslav Kautsky, Zdeněk Heydušek, Antonín Maleček |
| 7 | Germany | 6 | 0 | 6 | Curt Gerstmann, Hans-Georg Lindenstaedt, Daniel Prenn |

== Final play-off ==
| Austria 4 | Hungary 5 | Scores |
|---|---|---|
| Flussmann | Mechlovits | 16–21, 23–21, 18–21 |
| Flussmann | Pecsi | 21–14, 18–21, 16–21 |
| Flussmann | von Kehrling | 21–16, 21–19 |
| Freudenheim | Mechlovits | 15–21, 11–21 |
| Freudenheim | Pecsi | 15–21, 13–21 |
| Freudenheim | von Kehrling | 21–18, 12–21, 21–18 |
| Pillinger | Mechlovits | 21–12, 24–22 |
| Pillinger | Pecsi | 21–17, 21–13 |
| Pillinger | von Kehrling | 18–21, 21–11, 16–21 |

== See also ==
List of World Table Tennis Championships medalists
