= 1928 World Table Tennis Championships – Men's team =

Men's team event at the 1928 World Table Tennis Championships

1928 Swaythling Cup (men's team)
- Location: Stockholm

The 1928 World Table Tennis Championships – Swaythling Cup (men's team) was the second edition of the men's team championship event, held in Stockholm, Sweden.

Hungary defeated Austria and England 5–2 in a three-way final playoff for the gold medal. The three teams had tied in the main pool, finishing with a 7–1 match record.

== Final table ==
Pos	Team	P	W	L	Squad
1	Austria	8	7	1	Paul Flussmann, Alfred Liebster, Munio Pillinger, Robert Thum
2	Hungary	8	7	1	Laszlo Bellak, Sándor Glancz, Roland Jacobi, Zoltán Mechlovits, Daniel Pecsi
3	England	8	7	1	Charles Allwright, Charles Bull, Adrian Haydon, Charles Mase, Fred Perry
4	Latvia	8	5	3	Mordecai Finberg, Arnold Oschin, Rosenthal I, Rosenthal II
5	Sweden	8	4	4	Valter Kolmodin, Hille Nilsson, Ragnar Söderholz
6	Czechoslovakia	8	3	5	Erwin Fleischmann, Kurt Heller, Antonín Maleček, Bedřich Nikodém
7	Germany	8	2	6	D Baumgarten, Herbert Caro, Heribert Haensch, Hans-Georg Lindenstaedt, Paul Mendel
8	Wales	8	1	7	Trevor Coles, Herbert Geen, Cyril Mossford, Hedley Penny, Solly Stone
9	India	8	0	8	H.N. Bhorucha, S.A. Ismael, S.R.G. Suppiah

== Final Playoffs ==
The final consisted of a three-way playoff between Hungary, Austria, and England, who all finished with a 7–2 record in the main table.

Austria 5	England 2	Scores
Thum	Bull	21–08 24–22
Thum	Haydon	21–14 09–21 18–21
Thum	Perry	17–21 21–16 21–13
Flussmann	Bull	18–21 21–17 21–14
Flussmann	Haydon	23–25 21–18 17–21
Liebster	Bull	21–19 07–21 21–19
Liebster	Haydon	21–14 18–21 21–12

Austria 2	Hungary 5	Scores
Thum	Mechlovits	19–21 18–21
Thum	Glancz	10–21 17–21
Thum	Bellak	21–11 21–15
Liebster	Mechlovits	18–21 15–21
Liebster	Glancz	21–19 23–21
Pillinger	Mechlovits	13–21 21–17 17–21
Pillinger	Bellak	12–21 20–22

England 2	Hungary 5	Scores
Bull	Mechlovits	21–19 11–21 21–11
Bull	Glancz	17–21 21–17 21–17
Bull	Bellak	14–21 21–12 18–21
Allwright	Mechlovits	21–18 13–21 11–21
Allwright	Bellak	17–21 16–21
Haydon	Glancz	09–21 13–21
Haydon	Bellak	10–21 10–21

== See also ==
List of World Table Tennis Championships medalists
