= 1928 World Table Tennis Championships – Men's doubles =

1928 Men's doubles
- Location: Stockholm

The 1928 World Table Tennis Championships men's doubles was the second edition of the men's doubles championship. Alfred Liebster and Robert Thum defeated Charles Bull and Fred Perry in the final by three sets to nil.

== Results ==
Round of 16
(England) Frank Wilde (England) Charles Allwright	21	21	21
(India) S.R.G. Suppiah (India) H.N. Bhorucha	17	13	15
(Kingdom of Hungary) Zoltán Mechlovits (Kingdom of Hungary) Roland Jacobi	21	21	21
(Wales) Cyril Mossford (Wales) Solly Stone	16	6	16
(Sweden) Folke Johansson (Sweden) Harald Feldin	9	21	6	8
(England) Charles Bull (England) Fred Perry	22	15	21	21
(Czechoslovakia) Antonín Maleček (Czechoslovakia) Erwin Fleischmann	21	16	16	17
(Austria) Paul Flussmann (Austria) Munio Pillinger	16	21	21	21
(Germany) Heribert Haensch (Kingdom of Hungary) Daniel Pecsi	8	12	21	21	22
(Sweden) Valter Kolmodin (Sweden) Hille Nilsson	21	21	18	15	20
(Kingdom of Hungary) Laszlo Bellak (Kingdom of Hungary) Sándor Glancz	21	21	20	21
(Sweden) Harry Antonsson (Sweden) Ragnar Hallsten	11	11	22	12
(Austria) Alfred Liebster (Austria) Robert Thum	19	21	22	21
(England) Bernard Hookins (England) Adrian Haydon	21	13	20	12
(Germany) D Baumgarten (Germany) Herbert Caro	12	16	19
(Wales) Trevor Coles (Wales) Hedley Penny	21	21	21

Quarterfinals
(England) Wilde (England) Allwright	17	17	14
(Kingdom of Hungary) Mechlovits (Kingdom of Hungary) Jacobi	21	21	21
(England) Bull (England) Perry	21	21	13	15	21
(Austria) Flussmann (Austria) Pillinger	12	12	21	21	17
(Germany) Haensch (Kingdom of Hungary) Pecsi	14	13	21	11
(Kingdom of Hungary) Bellak (Kingdom of Hungary) Glancz	21	21	18	21
(Austria) Liebster (Austria) Thum	21	21	22
(Wales) Coles (Wales) Penny	16	10	20

Semifinals
(Kingdom of Hungary) Mechlovits (Kingdom of Hungary) Jacobi	14	18	12
(England) Bull (England) Perry	21	21	21
(Kingdom of Hungary) Bellak (Kingdom of Hungary) Glancz	12	21	21	10	10+
(Austria) Liebster (Austria) Thum	21	9	14	21	18+

Final
(England) Bull (England) Perry	10	13	16
(Austria) Liebster (Austria) Thum	21	21	21

+ retired

== See also ==
List of World Table Tennis Championships medalists
