= 1930 World Table Tennis Championships – Men's team =

1930 Swaythling Cup (men's team)
- Location: Berlin

The 1930 World Table Tennis Championships – Swaythling Cup (men's team) was the fourth edition of the men's team championship.

Hungary won the gold medal following a perfect 9-0 match record.

== Swaythling Cup final table ==
Pos	Team	P	W	L	Squad
1	Hungary	9	9	0	Viktor Barna, Laszlo Bellak, Lajos Dávid, István Kelen, Miklós Szabados
2	Sweden	9	8	1	Carl-Eric Bulow, Valter Kolmodin, Hille Nilsson, Folke Pettersson, Henry Wilbert
3	Czechoslovakia	9	7	2	Mikuláš Fried, Bohumil Hájek, Antonín Maleček, Zdeněk Heydušek, Bedřich Nikodém
4	Austria	9	6	3	Manfred Feher, Paul Flussmann, Erwin Kohn, Alfred Liebster, Robert Thum
5	Latvia	9	5	4	A Grapmans, Mordecai Finberg, Arnold Oschin, Kārlis Paegle
6	England	9	4	5	Vincent Blatchford, H.C. Cooke, Bernard Hookins, Stanley Proffitt, Tommy Sears
7	Germany	9	3	6	Herbert Caro, Hans-Georg Lindenstaedt, Nikita Madjaroglou, Cassius Weynand
8	India	9	2	7	D.P. Dhole, Wishnu Kirloskar, A.A Pirzada, Shivdasani, S.Tagore
9	Wales	9	1	8	I.M Davies, Tom Smith, D.V. Williams, T.P Williams
10	Lithuania	9	0	9	M. Blumenthal, E. Glickmann, Mykulas Glickmann, Choné Simensas

== See also ==
List of World Table Tennis Championships medalists
