= 1926 World Table Tennis Championships – Mixed doubles =

1926 Mixed doubles
- Location: London

The 1926 World Table Tennis Championships mixed doubles was the inaugural edition of the mixed doubles championship.

Zoltán Mechlovits and Mária Mednyánszky defeated Roland Jacobi and Linda Gleeson in the final by two sets to nil.

== Results ==
Round of 16
(England) George Ross (England) Joan Ingram
bye
(Austria) Paul Flussmann (Austria) Anastasia Flussmann	10	14
(Kingdom of Hungary) Roland Jacobi (England) Linda Gleeson	21	21
(England) Reginald Berry (England) Kathleen Berry	21	14	14
(England) H.A. Bennett (England) Winifred Land	16	21	21
(England) Bill Pope (England) A. Stevens	11	12
(England) H.L. Morgan (England) K Beaujoy	21	21
(Austria) Eduard Freudenheim (Austria) Gertrude Wildam	21	21
(Wales) Solly Stone (Wales) Doris Gubbins	16	13
(Kingdom of Hungary) Daniel Pecsi (England) Spring	16	21	21
(England) E.G. Nye (England) G. McCosh	21	11	18
(England) Percival Bromfield (England) Valerie Bromfield	w/o
(Czechoslovakia) Zdeněk Heydušek (Czechoslovakia) Riegrova	scr
(Kingdom of Hungary) Zoltán Mechlovits (Kingdom of Hungary) Mária Mednyánszky
bye

Quarterfinals
(England) Ross (England) Ingram	18	7
(Kingdom of Hungary) Jacobi (Kingdom of Hungary) Gleeson	21	21
(England) Bennett (England) Land	21	21
(England) Morgan (England) Beaufoy	13	14
(Austria) Freudenheim (Austria) Wildam	21	21
(Kingdom of Hungary) Pecsi (England) Spring	18	8
(England) Bromfield (England) Bromfield	15	14
(Kingdom of Hungary) Mechlovits (Kingdom of Hungary) Mednyánszky	21	21

Semifinals
(Kingdom of Hungary) Jacobi (England) Gleeson	21	21
(England) Bennett (England) Land	7	19
(Austria) Freudenheim (Austria) Wildam	15	19
(Kingdom of Hungary) Mechlovits (Kingdom of Hungary) Mednyánszky	21	21

Final
(Kingdom of Hungary) Jacobi (England) Gleeson	14	8
(Kingdom of Hungary) Mechlovits (Kingdom of Hungary) Mednyánszky	21	21

== See also ==
List of World Table Tennis Championships medalists
