= 1926 World Table Tennis Championships – Men's doubles =

1926 Men's doubles
- Location: London

The 1926 World Table Tennis Championships men's doubles was the first edition of the men's doubles championship. Roland Jacobi and Daniel Pecsi defeated Zoltán Mechlovits and Béla von Kehrling in the final by three sets to one.

== Draw ==
=== Finals ===
Round of 16
(Germany) Daniel Prenn (Germany) Hans-Georg Lindenstaedt	w/o
(Czechoslovakia) Hodac (Czechoslovakia) Meissner	scr
(Czechoslovakia) Zdeněk Heydušek (Czechoslovakia) Jaroslav Kautsky	20	14	20	18
(Wales) Cyril Mossford (Wales) Hedley Penny	22	21	22	21
(Austria) Eduard Freudenheim (England) P Ranger	20	21	21	14	21
(India) W M Ernest (India) Ismael Kahn	22	11	17	21	15
(Kingdom of Hungary) Zoltán Mechlovits (Kingdom of Hungary) Béla von Kehrling	16	18	21	22	21
(England) Percival Bromfield (England) Lionel Farris	21	21	10	20	18
(India) A M Peermahomed (India) B C Singh	12	18	15
(Wales) Solly Stone (Wales) Herbert Geen	21	21	21
(Kingdom of Hungary) Roland Jacobi (Kingdom of Hungary) Daniel Pecsi	21	21	17	21
(Denmark) August Joergensen (Sweden) Henrik Ander	16	16	21	9
(Austria) Paul Flussmann (Austria) Munio Pillinger	21	21	21
(England) L F Restall (England) H L Morgan	18	12	16
(Germany) Curt Gerstmann (Germany) Fritz Zinn	13	9	9
(England) H A Bennett (England) George Ross	21	21	21

Quarterfinals
(Germany) Prenn (Germany) Lindenstaedt	21	7	17	17
(Wales) Mossford (Wales) Penny	14	21	21	21
(Austria) Freundenheim (England) Ranger	15	10	18
(Kingdom of Hungary) Mechlovits (Kingdom of Hungary) von Kehrling	21	21	21
(Wales) Stone (Wales) Geen	14	19	13
(Kingdom of Hungary) Jacobi (Kingdom of Hungary) Pecsi	21	21	21
(Austria) Flussman (Austria) Pillinger	21	21	21
(England) Bennett (England) Ross	12	5	17

Semifinals
(Wales) Mossford (Wales) Penny	12	20	17
(Kingdom of Hungary) Mechlovits (Kingdom of Hungary) von Kehrling	21	22	21
(Kingdom of Hungary) Jacobi (Kingdom of Hungary) Pecsi	21	21	18	21
(Austria) Flussman (Austria) Pillinger	14	12	21	8

Final
(Kingdom of Hungary) Mechlovits (Kingdom of Hungary) von Kehrling	21	21	19	21
(Kingdom of Hungary) Jacobi (Kingdom of Hungary) Pecsi	15	11	21	11

== See also ==
List of World Table Tennis Championships medalists
