= 1928 World Table Tennis Championships – Mixed doubles =

1928 Mixed doubles
- Location: Stockholm

The 1928 World Table Tennis Championships mixed doubles was the second edition of the mixed doubles championship.

Zoltán Mechlovits and Mária Mednyánszky defeated Daniel Pecsi and Erika Metzger in the final by two sets to one.

== Results ==
Round of 16
(Sweden) Hille Nilsson (Sweden) Ester Wennerström
bye
(Kingdom of Hungary) Zoltán Mechlovits (Kingdom of Hungary) Mária Mednyánszky
bye
(England) Charles Bull (England) Joan Ingram	21	21	21
(Sweden) Folke Johansson (Sweden) Carin Westberg	16	17	15
(Wales) Solly Stone (Wales) Doris Gubbins	w/o
(Austria) Alfred Liebster (Austria) Gertrude Wildam	scr
(England) Frank Wilde (England) Brenda Sommerville	19	17	16
(Kingdom of Hungary) Daniel Pecsi (Germany) Erika Metzger	21	21	21
(Kingdom of Hungary) Laszlo Bellak (Kingdom of Hungary) Anna Sipos	scr
(Germany) Hans-Georg Lindenstaedt (Norway) Ruth Andresen	w/o
(England) Fred Perry (England) Winifred Land
bye
(Austria) Robert Thum (Austria) Fanchette Flamm
bye

Quarterfinals
(Sweden) Nilsson (Sweden) Wennerström	0
(Kingdom of Hungary) Mechlovits (Kingdom of Hungary) Mednyánszky	3
(England) Bull (England) Ingram	w/o
(Wales) Stone (Wales) Gubbins	scr
(Kingdom of Hungary) Pecsi (Germany) Metzger	21	21	21
(Germany) Lindenstaedt (Norway) Andresen	11	15	11
(England) Perry (England) Land	14	14	21
(Austria) Thum (Austria) Flamm	21	21	12

Semifinals
(Kingdom of Hungary) Mechlovits (Kingdom of Hungary) Mednyánszky	w/o
(England) Bull (England) Ingram	scr
(Kingdom of Hungary) Pecsi (Germany) Metzger	w/o
(England) Perry (England) Land	scr

Final
(Kingdom of Hungary) Mechlovits (Kingdom of Hungary) Mednyánszky	19	22	21
(Kingdom of Hungary) Pecsi (Germany) Metzger	21	20	16

== See also ==
List of World Table Tennis Championships medalists
