= 1926 World Table Tennis Championships – Men's singles =

1926 Men's singles
- Location: London

The 1926 World Table Tennis Championships men's singles was the first edition of the men's singles championship. Roland Jacobi met compatriot Zoltán Mechlovits in the final of this event. The latter won 21–12, 24–22, 21–19.

== Draw ==
=== Key ===
- Q = Qualifier
- w/o = Walkover
- w/d = Withdraw
- r = Retired
- DQ = Disqualified

=== Finals ===
Round of 16
(Kingdom of Hungary) Roland Jacobi	21	21	21
(India) T.A. Dawn	18	18	13
(India) A.M. Peemahomed	21	21	21	18	20
(India) W. Ernest	17	23	14	21	22
(Wales) Hedley Penny	19	21	21	15	21
(England) Lionel Farris	21	11	12	21	18
(Weimar Republic) Hans-Georg Lindenstadt	23	16	17
(Austria) Munio Pillinger	25	21	21
(India) S.R.G. Suppiah	19	21	21	16	21
(Wales) Trevor Coles	21	19	12	21	12
(Wales) Cyril Mossford	16	18	22	21	22
(Austria) Eduard Freudenheim	21	21	20	17	24
(India) Hassan Ali Fyzee	21	11	21	24	21
(India) Athar-Ali Fyzee	16	21	17	26	14
(England) Charles Allwright	15	13	15
(Kingdom of Hungary) Zoltán Mechlovits	21	21	21

Quarterfinals
(Kingdom of Hungary) Roland Jacobi	21	18	21	21
(India) W. Ernest	12	21	15	18
(Wales) Hedley Penny	21	18	13	19
(Austria) Munio Pillinger	13	21	21	21
(India) S.R.G. Suppiah	13	21	21	21
(Austria) Eduard Freudenheim	21	16	11	15
(India) Hassan Ali Fyzee	8	11	18
(Kingdom of Hungary) Zoltán Mechlovits	21	21	21

Semifinals
(Kingdom of Hungary) Roland Jacobi	18	21	21	21
(Austria) Munio Pillinger	21	12	15	16
(India) S.R.G. Suppiah	19	9	8
(Kingdom of Hungary) Zoltán Mechlovits	21	21	21

Final
(Kingdom of Hungary) Roland Jacobi	21	24	21
(Kingdom of Hungary) Zoltán Mechlovits	12	22	19
