= Table tennis in India =

- Country: India
- Governing body: Table Tennis Federation of India
- National team: See below

Club competitions
- Ultimate Table Tennis (2017–present)

Table tennis is a popular indoor recreation sport in India. It has gained popularity in states like West Bengal, Tamil Nadu, Gujarat, and Maharashtra. The official governing body of the sport in India is the Table Tennis Federation of India. As of February 2025, the men's team is ranked 12th in the world while the women's team is ranked 9th. India has produced many singles players who have ranked in the top 50 in both categories.

== Medal table ==
Competition	1st place, gold medalist(s)	2nd place, silver medalist(s)	3rd place, bronze medalist(s)	Total
World Championships	0	0	2	2
Commonwealth Games	10	5	13	28
Asian Games	0	0	4	4
Asian Cup	0	1	2	3
Asian Championships	0	0	8	8
Total	10	6	29	45

- Updated till October 2024

== Medalists ==
=== World Championships ===
Year	Players	Category	Medal
1926	Athar-Ali Fyzee; Hassan Ali Fyzee; A.M. Peermahomed; B.C. Singh; S.R.G. Suppiah	Men's team	3rd place, bronze medalist(s)
1926	S.R.G. Suppiah	Men's singles	3rd place, bronze medalist(s)

=== Commonwealth Games ===
Year	Players	Category	Medal
2014	Anthony Amalraj; Sharath Kamal	Men's doubles	2nd place, silver medalist(s)
2018	Manika Batra	Women's singles	1st place, gold medalist(s)
2018	Manika Batra; Mouma Das; Sutirtha Mukherjee; Madhurika Patkar; Pooja Sahasrabudhe	Women's team	1st place, gold medalist(s)
2018	Sharath Kamal; Anthony Amalraj; Harmeet Desai; Sanil Shetty; Sathiyan Gnanasekaran	Men's team	1st place, gold medalist(s)
2018	Sharath Kamal; Sathiyan Gnanasekaran	Men's doubles	2nd place, silver medalist(s)
2018	Manika Batra; Mouma Das	Women's doubles	2nd place, silver medalist(s)
2018	Sharath Kamal	Men's singles	3rd place, bronze medalist(s)
2018	Harmeet Desai; Sanil Shetty	Men's doubles	3rd place, bronze medalist(s)
2018	Manika Batra; Sathiyan Gnanasekaran	Mixed doubles	3rd place, bronze medalist(s)
2022	Sharath Kamal	Men's singles	1st place, gold medalist(s)
2022	Sharath Kamal; Sreeja Akula	Mixed doubles	1st place, gold medalist(s)
2022	Bhavina Patel	Women's singles C35	1st place, gold medalist(s)
2022	Harmeet Desai; Sanil Shetty; Sharath Kamal; Sathiyan Gnanasekaran	Men's team	1st place, gold medalist(s)
2022	Sharath Kamal; Sathiyan Gnanasekaran	Men's doubles	2nd place, silver medalist(s)
2022	Sathiyan Gnanasekaran	Men's singles	3rd place, bronze medalist(s)
2022	Sonalben Patel	Women's singles C35	3rd place, bronze medalist(s)

=== Asian Games ===
Year	Players	Category	Medal
2018	Anthony Amalraj; Harmeet Desai; Sathiyan Gnanasekaran; Sharath Kamal; Manav Thakkar	Men's team	3rd place, bronze medalist(s)
2018	Manika Batra; Sharath Kamal	Mixed doubles	3rd place, bronze medalist(s)
2022	Ayhika Mukherjee; Sutirtha Mukherjee	Women's doubles	3rd place, bronze medalist(s)

=== Asian Championships ===
Year	Players	Category	Medal
1976	Manjit Dua; Vilas Menon	Men's doubles	3rd place, bronze medalist(s)
2021	Harmeet Desai; Manav Thakkar	Men's doubles	3rd place, bronze medalist(s)
2021	Sharath Kamal; Sathiyan Gnanasekaran	Men's doubles	3rd place, bronze medalist(s)
2021	Sanil Shetty; Harmeet Desai; Manav Thakkar; Sathiyan Gnanasekaran; Sharath Kamal	Men's team	3rd place, bronze medalist(s)
2023	Sathiyan Gnanasekaran; Manush Shah; Harmeet Desai; Manav Thakkar; Sharath Kamal	Men's team	3rd place, bronze medalist(s)
2024	Manika Batra; Ayhika Mukherjee; Sreeja Akula; Diya Chitale; Sutirtha Mukherjee	Women's team	3rd place, bronze medalist(s)
2024	Sharath Kamal; Harmeet Desai; Manav Thakkar; Manush Shah; Sathiyan Gnanasekaran	Men's team	3rd place, bronze medalist(s)
2024	Ayhika Mukherjee; Sutirtha Mukherjee	Women's doubles	3rd place, bronze medalist(s)

=== Asian Cup ===
Year	Players	Category	Medal
1997	Chetan Baboor	Men's singles	2nd place, silver medalist(s)
2000	Chetan Baboor	Men's singles	3rd place, bronze medalist(s)
2022	Manika Batra	Women's singles	3rd place, bronze medalist(s)

== World rankings ==
=== Men's singles ===
#	Player	Rank
1	Manav Thakkar	47
2	Harmeet Desai	68
3	Manush Shah	73
4	Snehit Suravajjula	89
5	Sathiyan Gnanasekaran	105
6	Payas Jain	155
7	Ankur Bhattacharjee	176

=== Women's singles ===
#	Player	Rank
1	Manika Batra	29
2	Sreeja Akula	32
3	Ayhika Mukherjee	75
4	Yashaswini Ghorpade	78
5	Sutirtha Mukherjee	101

=== Men's doubles ===
#	Players	Rank	Points
1	Manav Thakkar; Manush Shah	13	1165
2	Harmeet Desai; Manav Thakkar	36	405
3	Sharath Kamal; Sathiyan Gnanasekaran	102	122

=== Women's doubles ===
#	Players	Rank	Points
1	Sutirtha Mukherjee; Ayhika Mukherjee	14	985
2	Diya Chitale; Yashaswini Ghorpade	29	588
3	Sreeja Akula; Archana Kamath	41	400

=== Mixed doubles ===
#	Players	Rank	Points
1	Diya Chitale; Manush Shah	14	734
2	Harmeet Desai; Yashaswini Ghorpade	20	520
3	Manav Thakkar; Archana Kamath	25	464

== Notable Olympics performance ==
Year	Event	Player	Result
2024
2024	Women's team	Sreeja Akula; Manika Batra; Archana Kamath	Quarterfinals

== National award recipients ==
Year	Recipient	Award	Gender
2020	Manika Batra	Rajiv Gandhi Khel Ratna	Female
2022	Dhruv Khedkar	Padma Shri	Male
1961	J. C. Vohra	Arjuna Award	Male
1964	Gautam R. Diwan	Arjuna Award	Male
1966	Usha Sunder Das	Arjuna Award	Female
1967	Faruk R. Khodaiji	Arjuna Award	Male
1969	Mir Khasim Ali	Arjuna Award	Male
1970	Gudalore Jagannath	Arjuna Award	Male
1971	Kaity Farookh Khodaiji	Arjuna Award	Female
1973	Niraj Ramkrishna Bajaj	Arjuna Award	Male
1976	Shailaja Salokhe	Arjuna Award	Female
1979–1980	Indu Puri	Arjuna Award	Female
1980–1981	Manjit Dua	Arjuna Award	Male
1982	Venugopal Chandrasekhar	Arjuna Award	Male
1985	Kamlesh Mehta	Arjuna Award	Male
1987	Monalisa Baruah Mehta	Arjuna Award	Female
1989	Niyati Shah	Arjuna Award	Female
1990	M. S. Walia	Arjuna Award	Male
1997	Chetan Baboor	Arjuna Award	Male
1998	Subramaniam Raman	Arjuna Award	Male
2002	Mantu Ghosh	Arjuna Award	Female
2004	Sharath Kamal	Arjuna Award	Male
2005	Soumyadeep Roy	Arjuna Award	Male
2006	Subhajit Saha	Arjuna Award	Male
2009	Poulomi Ghatak	Arjuna Award	Female
2013	Mouma Das	Arjuna Award	Female
2016	Soumyajit Ghosh	Arjuna Award	Male
2017	Anthony Amalraj	Arjuna Award	Male
2018	Manika Batra	Arjuna Award	Female
2018	Sathiyan Gnanasekaran	Arjuna Award	Male
2019	Harmeet Desai	Arjuna Award	Male
2020	Madhurika Patkar	Arjuna Award	Female
2022	Sreeja Akula	Arjuna Award	Female
2019	Arup Basak	Dhyan Chand Award	Male
2012	Bhawani Mukherjee ^{+}	Dronacharya Award	Male
2018	A. Srinivasa Rao	Dronacharya Award	Male
2019	Sandip Gupta	Dronacharya Award	Male
2021	Subramanian Raman	Dronacharya Award	Male

Key
+ Indicates a Lifetime contribution honour
