= 1928 World Table Tennis Championships – Women's doubles =

1928 Women's doubles
- Location: Stockholm

The 1928 World Table Tennis Championships women's doubles was the inaugural edition of the women's doubles championship.

Fanchette Flamm and Mária Mednyánszky defeated Doris Gubbins and Brenda Sommerville in the final by three sets to nil.

== Results ==
First Round
(Sweden) Lisa Lövdahl (Sweden) Margyl Brandt
bye
(Wales) Doris Gubbins (England) Brenda Sommerville	22	21	13	21
(Germany) Erika Metzger (Norway) Ruth Andresen	20	19	21	18
(Kingdom of Hungary) Mária Mednyánszky (Austria) Fanchette Flamm	21	21	21
(Sweden) Carin Westberg (Sweden) Ester Wennerström	6	9	11
(England) Joan Ingram (England) Winifred Land
bye

Semifinals
(Sweden) Lövdahl (Sweden) Brandt
(Wales) Gubbins (England) Sommerville	w/o
(Kingdom of Hungary) Mednyánszky (Austria) Flamm	20	21	21	21
(England) Ingram (England) Land	22	12	16	18

Final
(Wales) Gubbins (England) Sommerville	16	21	11
(Kingdom of Hungary) Mednyánszky (Austria) Flamm	21	23	21

== See also ==
List of World Table Tennis Championships medalists
