= 1928 World Table Tennis Championships – Women's singles =

1928 Women's singles
- Location: Stockholm

The 1928 World Table Tennis Championships women's singles was the second edition of the women's singles championship. Mária Mednyánszky defeated Erika Metzger in the final of this event, 21–19, 22–20, 21–13.

== Draw ==
=== Key ===
- Q = Qualifier
- w/o = Walkover
- w/d = Withdraw
- r = Retired
- DQ = Disqualified

=== Finals ===
Round of 16
(Kingdom of Hungary) Mária Mednyánszky	25	21	21
(England) Winifred Land	23	13	15
(Sweden) Ester Wennerstrom	21	21	15	21	20
(Norway) Ruth Andresen	9	23	21	17	22
(Austria) Fanchette Flamm	13	13	21	21	21
(Sweden) Lisa Lövdahl	21	21	10	17	14
(Sweden) Margyl Brandt	20	9	21	14
(England) Joan Ingram	22	21	19	21
(Wales) Doris Gubbins	18	21	21	21
(Sweden) Lisa Akerstrom	21	9	15	8
(Kingdom of Hungary) Anna Sipos
(Sweden) Ellen Stridh	W/O
(Sweden) Asta Fogel	22	21	17	21
(England) Brenda Sommerville	20	19	21	18
(Sweden) Carin Westberg	12	13	14
(Weimar Republic) Erika Metzger	21	21	21

Quarterfinals
(Kingdom of Hungary) Mária Mednyánszky	21	21	21
(Norway) Ruth Andresen	5	7	0
(Austria) Fanchette Flamm	10	15	12
(England) Joan Ingram	21	21	21
(Wales) Doris Gubbins	21	21	21
(Sweden) Ellen Stridh	7	10	6
(Sweden) Asta Fogel	17	18	3
(Weimar Republic) Erika Metzger	21	21	21

Semifinals
(Kingdom of Hungary) Mária Mednyánszky	22	21	21
(England) Joan Ingram	20	17	16
(Wales) Doris Gubbins	18	19	21	20
(Weimar Republic) Erika Metzger	21	21	17	22

Final
(Kingdom of Hungary) Mária Mednyánszky	21	22	21
(Weimar Republic) Erika Metzger	19	20	13

== See also ==
- List of World Table Tennis Championships medalists
