= 1928 World Table Tennis Championships – Men's singles =

1928 Men's singles
- Location: Stockholm

The 1928 World Table Tennis Championships men's singles was the second edition of the men's singles championship. Zoltán Mechlovits met compatriot Laszlo Bellak in the final of this event. The latter won 8–21, 18–21, 24–22, 21–12, 21–15.

== Draw ==
=== Key ===
- Q = Qualifier
- w/o = Walkover
- w/d = Withdraw
- r = Retired
- DQ = Disqualified

=== Finals ===
Round of 16
(Sweden) Ragnar Söderholz	21	21	22
(Czechoslovakia) Kurt Heller	15	18	20
(Kingdom of Hungary) Zoltán Mechlovits	21	21	21
(Latvia) I. Rosenthal	9	18	16
(Czechoslovakia) Antonin Malecek	14	17	18
(Austria) Alfred Liebster	21	21	21
(Kingdom of Hungary) Sándor Glancz	21	21	21
(England) Charles Allwright	15	7	17
(England) Fred Perry	21	21	14	21
(Czechoslovakia) Erwin Fleischmann	9	7	21	14
(Kingdom of Hungary) Laszlo Bellak	21	21	17	21
(Sweden) Valter Kolmodin	13	13	21	11
(England) Adrian Haydon	26	18	22	21
(Kingdom of Hungary) Roland Jacobi	24	21	20	16
(Wales) Trevor Coles	12	21	19
(Austria) Paul Flussmann	21	23	21

Quarterfinals
(Sweden) Ragnar Söderholz
(Kingdom of Hungary) Zoltán Mechlovits	W/O
(Austria) Alfred Liebster	12	13	21	21	21
(Kingdom of Hungary) Sándor Glancz	21	21	18	13	18
(England) Fred Perry	7	19	16
(Kingdom of Hungary) Laszlo Bellak	21	21	21
(England) Adrian Haydon	16	21	12	18
(Austria) Paul Flussmann	21	16	21	21

Semifinals
(Kingdom of Hungary) Zoltán Mechlovits	21	21	21
(Austria) Alfred Liebster	17	5	16
(Kingdom of Hungary) Laszlo Bellak	21	21	21
(Austria) Paul Flussmann	10	19	14

Final
(Kingdom of Hungary) Zoltán Mechlovits	8	18	24	21	21
(Kingdom of Hungary) Laszlo Bellak	21	21	22	12	15
