= 1928 World Table Tennis Championships =

The 2nd World Table Tennis Championships were held in Stockholm from January 24 to January 29, 1928.

== Medalists ==
=== Team ===
Event	Gold	Silver	Bronze
Men's team Swaythling Cup	Hungary; Laszlo Bellak; Sándor Glancz; Roland Jacobi; Zoltán Mechlovits; Daniel Pecsi	Austria; Paul Flussmann; Alfred Liebster; Munio Pillinger; Robert Thum	England; Charles Allwright; Charles Bull; Adrian Haydon; Charles Mase; Fred Perry

=== Individual ===
Event	Gold	Silver	Bronze
Men's singles	(Kingdom of Hungary) Zoltán Mechlovits	(Kingdom of Hungary) Laszlo Bellak	(Austria) Paul Flussmann
Men's singles	(Kingdom of Hungary) Zoltán Mechlovits	(Kingdom of Hungary) Laszlo Bellak	(Austria) Alfred Liebster
Women's singles	(Kingdom of Hungary) Mária Mednyánszky	(Weimar Republic) Erika Metzger	(Wales) Doris Gubbins
Women's singles	(Kingdom of Hungary) Mária Mednyánszky	(Weimar Republic) Erika Metzger	(England) Joan Ingram
Men's doubles	(Austria) Alfred Liebster (Austria) Robert Thum	(England) Charles Bull (England) Fred Perry	(Kingdom of Hungary) Laszlo Bellak (Kingdom of Hungary) Sándor Glancz
Men's doubles	(Austria) Alfred Liebster (Austria) Robert Thum	(England) Charles Bull (England) Fred Perry	(Kingdom of Hungary) Roland Jacobi (Kingdom of Hungary) Zoltán Mechlovits
Women's doubles	(Austria) Fanchette Flamm (Kingdom of Hungary) Mária Mednyánszky	(Wales) Doris Gubbins (England) Brenda Sommerville	(England) Joan Ingram (England) Winifred Land
Mixed doubles	(Kingdom of Hungary) Zoltán Mechlovits (Kingdom of Hungary) Mária Mednyánszky	(Kingdom of Hungary) Daniel Pecsi (Weimar Republic) Erika Metzger	(England) Charles Bull (England) Joan Ingram
Mixed doubles	(Kingdom of Hungary) Zoltán Mechlovits (Kingdom of Hungary) Mária Mednyánszky	(Kingdom of Hungary) Daniel Pecsi (Weimar Republic) Erika Metzger	(England) Fred Perry (England) Winifred Land
