= 1926 World Table Tennis Championships – Women's singles =

1926 Women's singles
- Location: London

The 1926 World Table Tennis Championships women's singles was the first edition of the women's singles championship. Mária Mednyánszky defeated Doris Gubbins in the final of this event 21–15, 21–19.

== Draw ==
=== Key ===
- Q = Qualifier
- w/o = Walkover
- w/d = Withdraw
- r = Retired
- DQ = Disqualified

=== Finals ===
First Round
(England) Annie Hall
(England) Joyce Hansor	W/O
(Austria) Anastasia Flussmann	21	21
(England) D.E. Wynter	13	11
(Wales) Doris Gubbins	21	21
(England) Linda Gleeson	12	13
(England) Mead	7	11
(England) Kathleen Berry	21	21
(England) Joan Ingram	W/O
(Czechoslovakia) Riegrova
(England) G. McCosh	21	17
(England) Winifred Land	23	21
(Austria) Gertrude Wildam	21	21
(England) K. Beaufoy	13	6
(Kingdom of Hungary) Mária Mednyánszky	21	21
(England) Spring	6	7

Quarterfinals
(England) Joyce Hansor	21	11	18
(Austria) Anastasia Flussmann	16	21	21
(Wales) Doris Gubbins	16	21	21
(England) Kathleen Berry	21	16	18
(England) Joan Ingram	12	19
(England) Winifred Land	21	21
(Austria) Gertrude Wildam	18	11
(Kingdom of Hungary) Mária Mednyánszky	21	21

Semifinals
(Austria) Anastasia Flussmann	14	15
(Wales) Doris Gubbins	21	21
(England) Winifred Land	24	9
(Kingdom of Hungary) Mária Mednyánszky	26	21

Final
(Wales) Doris Gubbins	15	19
(Kingdom of Hungary) Mária Mednyánszky	21	21

== See also ==
List of World Table Tennis Championships medalists
