= Flussmann =

Flussmann is a surname of German and Yiddish origin (German: Fluss for river). Notable people with the surname include:

- Anastasia Flussmann, Austrian international table tennis player
- Paul Flussmann, Austrian international table tennis player
