= Indian Sports Honours =

Indian sports award ceremony

- Awarded for: Excellence in Sports
- Sponsored by: Sevva Foundation
- Country: India
- Presented by: RPSG Group

History
- First award: 2017
- Editions: 5
- Most wins: Neeraj Chopra
- Most recent: 2024 edition
- Next ceremony: 2025 edition
- Website: Indian Sports Honours

Indian Sports Honours are annual sports awards given by the RPSG Group and the Sevva Foundation to sports personalities from India that have achieved excellence. The awards were founded in 2017.

== Background ==
The inaugural award ceremony was held on 11 November 2017 in Mumbai.

- Pullela Gopichand, former All England Champion and Badminton Coach
- Mahesh Bhupathi, Tennis Player and multiple Grand Slam winner
- P. T. Usha, former sprinter and former President of Indian Olympic Association
- Anjali Bhagwat, former rifle shooter
- Arjun Halappa, former captain of India men's national field hockey team

== Editions ==
Year	Edition	Hosts	Ref(s)
2017	1st Indian Sports Honours	Riteish Deshmukh Malaika Arora	
2019	2nd Indian Sports Honours	Sania Mirza Arjun Kapoor	
2021	3rd Indian Sports Honours	Aparshakti Khurana Saiyami Kher	
2023	4th Indian Sports Honours	Aparshakti Khurana Mallika Dua	
2024	5th Indian Sports Honours	Neha Dhupia Angad Bedi	

== 2017 ==
Sportsman of the Year	Sportswoman of the Year
Srikanth Kidambi; Pankaj Advani; Neeraj Chopra; Shiv Chawrasia	P. V. Sindhu; Dipa Karmakar; Lalita Babar; Sakshi Malik; Sania Mirza
Team Sportsman of the Year	Team Sportswoman of the Year
R Ashwin; Cheteshwar Pujara; Hardik Pandya; Pardeep Narwal; Rupinder Pal Singh; Sunil Chhetri	Mithali Raj; Deepti Sharma; Rani Rampal; Harmanpreet Kaur; Deepika Thakur
Emerging Sportsman of the Year	Emerging Sportswoman of the Year
Neeraj Chopra; Harmanpreet Singh; R Ramkumar; Sameer Verma; Vidit Gujrathi	Aditi Ashok; Ritu Phogat; Smriti Mandhana
Breakthrough of the Year	Comeback of the Year
Hardik Pandya; Harmanpreet Kaur; Dipa Karmakar; Sandesh Jhingan	Saina Nehwal; Amit Rohidas; Kedar Jadhav; Ajay Thakur
Differently Abled Sportsman of the Year	Differently Abled Sportswoman of the Year
Devendra Jhajharia; Mariyappan Thangavelu	Deepa Malik
Game Changer of the Year	Coach of the Year
Sunil Chhetri; P. V. Sindhu; Jasprit Bumrah; Ajay Thakur	Bishweshwar Nandi; Anil Kumble; Harendra Singh; Vijay Divecha; Balwan Singh
Team of the Year	Club of the Year
Women's cricket; Men's kabaddi; Men's cricket; Men's U21 hockey; Women's hockey	Mumbai Indians; Bengaluru FC; Patna Pirates; Aizawl FC
Others
Inspire Honour; Sania Mirza; Spirit of Sport Honour; Yogeshwar Dutt; Lifetime Achievement Honour; Balbir Singh

== 2019 ==
Sportsman of the Year	Sportswoman of the Year
Bajrang Punia; Pankaj Advani; Neeraj Chopra; Saurabh Chaudhary; Srikanth Kidambi	Vinesh Phogat; Mary Kom; P. V. Sindhu; Hima Das; Swapna Barman
Team Sportsman of the Year	Team Sportswoman of the Year
Sunil Chhetri; Rohit Sharma; Cheteshwar Pujara; Jasprit Bumrah	Smriti Mandhana; Harmanpreet Kaur; Savita Punia; Mithali Raj
Emerging Sportsman of the Year	Emerging Sportswoman of the Year
Saurabh Chaudhary; Prithvi Shaw; Lakshya Sen; M Sreeshankar	Manu Bhaker; Hima Das; Mehuli Ghosh; Sakshi Chaudhary
Men's Breakthrough of the Year	Women's Breakthrough of the Year
Jasprit Bumrah; Rishabh Pant; Pawan Sehrawat; Jeremy Lalrinnunga	Jemimah Rodrigues; Manu Bhaker; Manika Batra; Swapna Barman
Differently Abled Sportsman of the Year	Differently Abled Sportswoman of the Year
Sandeep Chaudhary; Suyash Jadhav; Sharad Kumar	Rakshitha Raju; Parul Parmar; Ekta Bhyan
Comeback of the Year	Spirit of Sport Honour
Dipa Karmakar; Dutee Chand; Vinesh Phogat; Maninder Singh	Sunil Chhetri; Ajinkya Rahane; Neeraj Chopra; Shailaja Jain
Team of the Year	Coach of the Year
Men's cricket; Men's hockey; Women's table tennis; Mixed badminton	Pullela Gopichand; Yogeshwar Dutt; Vijay Sharma; Sandeep Gupta
Club of the Year	Lifetime Achievement Honour
Chennai Super Kings; Patna Pirates; Real Kashmir FC; Bengaluru FC	Milkha Singh

== 2021 ==
Sportsman of the Year	Sportswoman of the Year
Amit Panghal; Saurabh Chaudhary; Bajrang Punia; Abhishek Verma	P. V. Sindhu; Vinesh Phogat; Apurvi Chandela; Koneru Humpy
Team Sportsman of the Year	Team Sportswoman of the Year
Rohit Sharma; Harmanpreet Singh; Mohammed Shami; Mandeep Singh	Rani Rampal; Smriti Mandhana; Gurjit Kaur; Deepti Sharma
Emerging Sportsman of the Year	Emerging Sportswoman of the Year
Deepak Punia; Manav Thakkar; Srihari Nataraj; Sameer Verma; R Praggnanandhaa	Elavenil Valarivan; Shafali Verma; Jamuna Boro; Archana Kamath
Men's Breakthrough of the Year	Women's Breakthrough of the Year
Brandon Fernandes; Mayank Agarwal; Naveen Kumar; Sumit Nagal	Shafali Verma; Ashalata Devi; Bhavani Devi; Sweety Kumari
Differently Abled Sportsman of the Year	Differently Abled Sportswoman of the Year
Pramod Bhagat; Sandeep Chaudhary; Sundar Singh Gurjar	Manasi Joshi; Ekta Bhyan; Avani Lekhara
Comeback of the Year	Spirit of Sport Honour
Mohammad Shami; Wriddhiman Saha; S. V. Sunil; Mirabai Chanu	KL Rahul; Man Kaur; Saina Nehwal; Hockey India
Team of the Year	Coach of the Year
Men's cricket; Men's table tennis; Junior men's cycling; Men's archery	Ravi Shastri; Jaspal Rana; Pullela Gopichand; R. B. Ramesh
Club of the Year	Lifetime Achievement Honour
Mumbai Indians; FC Goa; Bengal Warriorz; Bengaluru FC	I. M. Vijayan

== 2023 ==
Sportsman of the Year	Sportswoman of the Year
Neeraj Chopra; Sharath Kamal; Bajrang Punia; Ravi Dahiya	Mirabai Chanu; Nikhat Zareen; P. V. Sindhu; Vinesh Phogat
Team Sportsman of the Year	Team Sportswoman of the Year
P. R. Sreejesh; Chirag Shetty; Satwiksairaj Rankireddy; R Ashwin; Mohammed Siraj	Renuka Singh Thakur; Lovely Choubey; Rupa Rani Tirkey; Richa Ghosh; Savita Punia
Emerging Sportsman of the Year	Emerging Sportswoman of the Year
Lakshya Sen; Govind Sahani; Ronaldo Laitonjam; Umran Malik	Antim Panghal; Ridhi Phor; Shweta Sehrawat; Asha Kiran Barla
Differently Abled Sportsman of the Year	Differently Abled Sportswoman of the Year
Pramod Bhagat; Sumit Antil; Sudhir; Yogesh Kathuniya	Avani Lekhara; Bhavina Patel; Manisha Ramadass; Jayanti Behera
Comeback of the Year	Electrifying Performance of the Year
Neeraj Chopra; Hardik Pandya; Sharath Kamal	Shubman Gill; Nikhat Zareen; Lakshya Sen
Incredible T20 Performer	Incredible Young T20 Performer
Yuzvendra Chahal; Rahul Tewatia; Rajat Patidar	Shubman Gill; Umran Malik; Tilak Varma
Team of the Year	Coach of the Year
Women's U19 cricket; Men's U19 cricket; Women's lawn bowls; Men's badminton	Vijay Sharma; Nooshin Al Khadeer; Hrishikesh Kanitkar; Virender Kumar
Club of the Year	Lifetime Achievement Honour
Jaipur Pink Panthers; Gujarat Titans; Mumbai City FC	Prakash Padukone

== 2024 ==
Sportsman of the Year	Sportswoman of the Year
Neeraj Chopra; Aman Sehrawat; Swapnil Kusale; Sarabjot Singh	Manu Bhaker; Anahat Singh; Parul Chaudhary; Esha Singh
Team Sportsman of the Year	Team Sportswoman of the Year
Harmanpreet Singh; Jasprit Bumrah; Pawan Sehrawat; P. R. Sreejesh; Rohan Bopanna	Smriti Mandhana; Jemimah Rodrigues; Deepika Thakur; Pushpa Rana
Para Athlete of the Year Male	Para Athlete of the Year Female
Sumit Antil; Harvinder Singh; Kumar Nitesh; Navdeep Singh; Praveen Kumar; Dharambir Nain	Avani Lekhara; Preethi Pal; Sheetal Devi; Rubina Francis; Thulasimathi Murugesan
Breakthrough Performance of the Year Male	Breakthrough Performance of the Year Female
Yashasvi Jaiswal; Abhishek Nain; Sarabjot Singh; Rinku Singh	Shreyanka Patil; Esha Singh; Dhinidhi Desinghu; Salima Tete
Coach of the Year Male	Coach of the Year Female
Jaspal Rana; Craig Fulton; Rahul Dravid; Pullela Gopichand; Mathias Boe	Suma Shirur; Munkhbayar Dorjsuren; Purnima Mahato; Pranamika Borah
Team of the Year Male	Team of the Year Female
Hockey team; Cricket team; Kabaddi team; Chess team	Chess team; 25 m pistol team; Kabaddi team; Table tennis team
Club of the Year	Lifetime Achievement Honour
Kolkata Knight Riders; Royal Challengers Bengaluru; Puneri Paltan; Mohun Bagan SG	Murlikant Petkar

== 2026 ==
TBD

== See also ==
- Sport in India
