= Béla von Kehrling =

Hungarian tennis player (1891–1937)

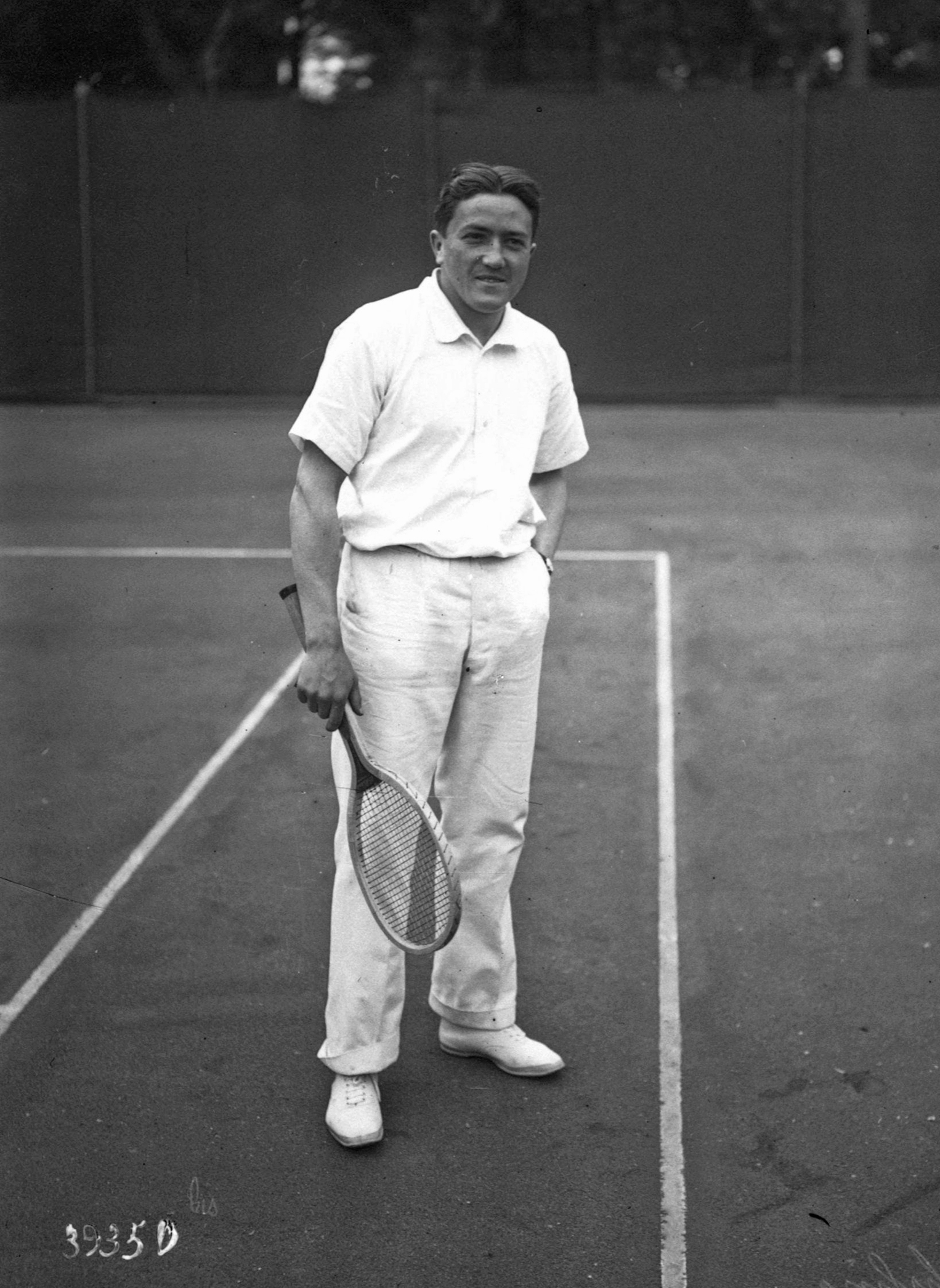
- Kehrling in 1914
- Country (sports): Hungary
- Born: 25 January 1891 Szepesszombat, Austria-Hungary (present-day Spišská Sobota as part of Poprad, Slovakia)
- Died: 26 April 1937 (aged 46) Budapest, Hungary
- Turned pro: 1910 (amateur tour)
- Retired: 1933
- Plays: Right-handed (1-handed backhand)

Singles
- Career titles: 312 (1931)
- Highest ranking: No. 10 (1929, Bill Tilden)

Grand Slam singles results
- French Open: QF (1926, 1929)
- Wimbledon: QF (1929)

Other tournaments
- WHCC: QF (1913, 1914)
- Olympic Games: 4R (1924)

Grand Slam doubles results
- French Open: QF (1926, 1929)
- Wimbledon: SF (1925, 1926)

Other doubles tournaments
- WHCC: SF (1914)
- Olympic Games: 2R (1912)

Grand Slam mixed doubles results
- Wimbledon: QF (1926, 1927)
Association football career
- Position: Defender
Senior career*
Years	Team	Apps	(Gls)
1910–1911	33 FC		
1911–1917	Magyar AC		
International career
1914–1916	Hungary	4	(0)
- * Club domestic league appearances and goals
Medal record
Table Tennis
Representing Hungary
World Table Tennis Championships
Silver medal – second place	London 1926	Doubles
Gold medal – first place	London 1926	Team

Béla von Kehrling (Hungarian: Kehrling Béla [ˈkeːrliŋɡ ˈbeːlɒ]; 25 January 1891 – 26 April 1937) was a Hungarian tennis, table tennis, and football player but eventually a winter sportsman familiar with ice-hockey and occasionally competing in bobsleigh. He competed at the 1912 Summer Olympics and the 1924 Summer Olympics.

== Career ==
Kehrling like Fred Perry, he played both tennis and table tennis professionally. In 1926 he played in the first table tennis World Championships final in London with Zoltán Mechlovits in doubles but lost to Roland Jacobi (who won the singles title) and Dániel Pécsi. He was also featured in the Hungarian team that won gold in team competition. Originally he wasn't part of the national team. While the Hungarians unanimously swept all of the medals after Roland Jacobi's singles and doubles success he suddenly been reported of the death of his father thus he decided to travel home. The substitute player was Béla von Kehrling who had to beat Munio Pillinger of Austria to have the team medal as well. He did so and completed the flawless victory for Hungary. In the end he took two medals in the table tennis world championships, one gold and one silver.

In 1924, he won the German Tennis Championships. The following year he was back in the finals but then lost against Otto Froitzheim. The same year he won Hungarian Tennis Championships (which he did 13 times altogether counting only the singles). In July 1933, Von Kehrling won the doubles and mixed doubles title at the Dutch Championships.

Züricher Sport newspaper ranked Kehrling as No. 10 in the European Top 10 rankings in 1931.

In conjunction with his sports activity he was the vice-president of the Hungarian Tennis Association and the editor-in-chief of its official magazine the bimonthly Tennisz és Golf (Tennis and Golf).

== Personal life ==
Béla Kehrling married Magda Schlauch. She occasionally played tennis as well and wrote articles to the newspaper published by her husband. They had one son named Béla Kehrling Jr, born in 1917 in Budapest who served as an ensign in the cavalry brigade of the Hungarian Army in 1944. They had another son named Tamás who was born in 1924 and died in 1999.

== Tennis career statistics ==
=== Singles titles ===
Legend (singles)
Grand Slam (0)
Consolation tournaments (2)
International Championships (13)

No.	Date	Tournament	Surface	Opponent	Score
1.	1920	Kassa	N/A	(Hungary) Kamill Fittler	N/A
1.	1923	Gothenburg Games	Outdoors	(Germany) Oscar Kreuzer	4–6, 6–4, 6–7, 6–4, 6–2
2.	1923	Merano	N/A	(Germany) Otto Froitzheim	11–9, 8–6, 6–0
3.	1924	German International Championships	N/A	(Germany) Louis Maria Heyden	8–6, 6–1, 9–7
4.	1925	All England Plate^{[a]}	Grass	(France) Roger George	6–3, 6–4
5.	1925	Lake Geneva Championships	Clay	(Austria) Ludwig von Salm-Hoogstraeten	6–1, 6–1, 6–2
6.	1925	Swiss International Covered Courts	Wood (i)	(Germany) Hans Moldenhauer	6–1, 6–1, 6–2
7.	1926	Monte Carlo Championships	Clay	(United Kingdom) Charles Kingsley	6–4, 6–1, 6–3
8.	1926	Nice	N/A	N/A	N/A
9.	1926	Beaulieu	N/A	N/A	N/A
10.	1926	Cannes	N/A	(United Kingdom) Charles Kingsley	7–5, 3–6, 6–1, 6–3
11.	1927	Monaco	Clay	(Denmark) Erik Worm	walkover
12.	1931	Budapest	N/A	(Japan) Hyotaro Sato	6–3, 6–2, 5–7, 6–2
13.	1931	French Riviera Championships	Clay	(Republic of Ireland) George Lyttleton-Rogers	7–5, 6–2, 6–4
14.	1932	Budapest	N/A		
15.	1932	Italian Riviera Championships	Clay	(Republic of Ireland) George Lyttleton-Rogers	6–3, 6–3, 6–3

=== Runner-up ===
No.	Date	Tournament	Surface	Opponent	Score
1.	1924	Switzerland		(Netherlands) Hendrik Timmer	3 sets to 2
2.	1925	Hamburg		(Germany) Otto Froitzheim	6–4, 6–1, 4–6, 6–1
3.	1928	Monaco	clay	(France) Henri Cochet	3–6, 2–6, 6–3, 6–3, 6–2
4.	1929	Bordighera	clay	(Italy) Giorgio De Stefani	6–4, 7–5, 6–4
5.	1930	Zagreb	clay	(France) Emmanuel du Plaix	6–1, 6–4, 3–6, 6–2
6.	1930	Budapest	clay	(Czechoslovakia) Roderich Menzel	4–6, 6–3, 6–4, 6–2
7.	1931	Bordighera	clay	(Republic of Ireland) George Lyttleton-Rogers	1–6, 6–3, 6–4, 0–6, 6–4
8.	1932	Cannes		(Spain) Enrique Maier	6–4, 7–9, 6–1, 6–4
9.	1933	Cannes		(Weimar Republic) Gottfried von Cramm	8–6, 6–3, 3–6, 8–6

- ^{a} The All England Plate was a tournament played by the losers of the first two rounds of the Wimbledon Men's Singles tournament.

=== Davis Cup ===
Europe Zone
Round	Date	Opponents	Final match score	Location	Surface	Match	Opponent	Rubber score
2R	16–18 May 1924	Denmark	2–3	Copenhagen	N/A	Singles 2	Einer Ulrich	10–8, 6–0, 6–4 (W)
2R	16–18 May 1924	Denmark	2–3	Copenhagen	N/A	Doubles (with Jenő Péteri)	Björn Thalbitzer / Einer Ulrich	5–7, 5–7, 6–1, 7–5, 5–7(L)
2R	16–18 May 1924	Denmark	2–3	Copenhagen	N/A	Singles 4	Axel Petersen	6–2, 6–4, 6–3 (W)
1R	8–10 May 1925	France	0–5	Budapest	clay	Singles 2	René Lacoste	3–6, 3–6, 3–6 (L)
1R	8–10 May 1925	France	0–5	Budapest	clay	Doubles (with Aurél Kelemen)	Jean Borotra / René Lacoste	4–6, 2–6, 10–8, 3–6(L)
1R	8–10 May 1925	France	0–5	Budapest	clay	Singles 4	Jean Borotra	6–8, 6–1, 6–4, 6–2 (W)
2R	16–18 May 1926	Argentina	2–3	Barcelona	clay	Singles 1	Guillermo Robson	6–3, 3–6, 6–3, 6–2 (W)
2R	16–18 May 1926	Argentina	2–3	Barcelona	clay	Doubles (with Kálmán Kirchmayer)	Enrique Obarrio / Guillermo Robson	2–6, 4–6, 3–6(L)
2R	16–18 May 1926	Argentina	2–3	Barcelona	clay	Singles 5	Enrique Obarrio	6–3, 7–5, 6–4 (W)
2R	13–15 May 1927	Italy	2–3	Budapest	N/A	Singles 1	Umberto De Morpurgo	7–5, 4–6, 4–6, 7–5, 1–6 (L)
2R	13–15 May 1927	Italy	2–3	Budapest	N/A	Doubles (with Jenő Péteri)	Umberto De Morpurgo / Giorgio De Stefani	3–6, 5–7, 6–8 (L)
2R	13–15 May 1927	Italy	2–3	Budapest	N/A	Singles 5	Clemente Serventi	6–2, 6–1, 6–4 (W)
1R	4–6 May 1928	Norway	5–0	Christiania	N/A	Singles 1	Rolf Christoffersen	6–1, 6–3, 6–1 (W)
1R	4–6 May 1928	Norway	5–0	Christiania	N/A	Doubles (with Jenő Péteri)	Rolf Christoffersen / Torleif Torkildsen	6–2 6–2 4–6 6–0 (W)
1R	4–6 May 1928	Norway	5–0	Christiania	N/A	Singles 4	Torleif Torkildsen	7–5, 3–6, 6–3, 6–1 (W)
2R	18–20 May 1928	Netherlands	2–3	Noordwijk	clay	Singles 2	Arthur Diemer Kool	7–5, 4–6, 2–6, 6–1, 1–1 Ret. (W)
2R	18–20 May 1928	Netherlands	2–3	Noordwijk	clay	Doubles (with Jenő Péteri)	Hendrik Timmer / Ody Koopman	6–1, 4–6, 2–6, 5–7 (L)
2R	18–20 May 1928	Netherlands	2–3	Noordwijk	clay	Singles 4	Hendrik Timmer	3–6, 4–6, 3–6 (L)
1R	10–12 May 1929	Norway	4–1	Oslo	N/A	Singles 2	Jack Nielsen	11–9, 1–6, 6–2, 6–2 (W)
1R	10–12 May 1929	Norway	4–1	Oslo	N/A	Doubles (with Pál Aschner)	Torleif Torkildsen / Jack Nielsen	6–4, 6–4, 6–1 (W)
1R	10–12 May 1929	Norway	4–1	Oslo	N/A	Singles 5	Torleif Torkildsen	6–1, 6–2, 6–1 (W)
2R	14–16 May 1929	Monaco	3–2	Budapest	N/A	Singles 2	Vladimir Landau	6–4, 6–4, 6–2 (W)
2R	14–16 May 1929	Monaco	3–2	Budapest	N/A	Doubles (with Jenő Péteri)	René Gallepe/Vladimir Landau	4–6, 6–3, 2–6, 8–10 (L)
2R	14–16 May 1929	Monaco	3–2	Budapest	N/A	Singles 4	René Gallepe	6–0, 6–3, 6–1 (W)
QF	7–9 June 1929	Netherlands	3–2	Budapest	clay	Singles 1	Arthur Diemer Kool	6–2, 6–1, 6–2 (W)
QF	7–9 June 1929	Netherlands	3–2	Budapest	clay	Doubles (with Imre Takáts)	Hendrik Timmer / Arthur Diemer Kool	6–1, 2–6, 6–4, 3–6, 2–6 (L)
QF	7–9 June 1929	Netherlands	3–2	Budapest	clay	Singles 5	Hendrik Timmer	8–6, 6–3, 3–6, 6–3 (W)
SF	14–16 June 1929	Great Britain	2–3	Budapest	clay	Singles 1	Colin Gregory	5–7, 7–5, 5–7, 6–2, 6–3 (W)
SF	14–16 June 1929	Great Britain	2–3	Budapest	clay	Doubles (with Pál Aschner)	Colin Gregory / Ian Collins	2–6, 6–4, 2–6, 3–6 (L)
SF	14–16 June 1929	Great Britain	2–3	Budapest	clay	Singles 4	Bunny Austin	3–6, 6–4, 6–2, 6–2 (W)
1R	2–4 May 1930	Japan	0–4	Budapest	clay	Singles 1	Takeichi Harada	6–2, 3–6, 6–8, 2–6 (L)
1R	2–4 May 1930	Japan	0–4	Budapest	clay	Doubles (with Pál Aschner)	Tamio Abe / Takeichi Harada	2–6, 2–6, 6–3, 4–6 (L)
1R	2–4 May 1930	Japan	0–4	Budapest	clay	Singles 5	Yoshiro Ota	4–6, 6–4, 7–5, 6–6 suspended (U)
1R	1–3 May 1931	Italy	1–4	Budapest	clay	Singles 2	Umberto De Morpurgo	6–3, 6–3, 6–4 (W)
1R	1–3 May 1931	Italy	1–4	Budapest	clay	Doubles (with Emil Gábori)	Alberto del Bono / Umberto De Morpurgo	6–8, 6–3, 5–7, 5–7 (L)
1R	1–3 May 1931	Italy	1–4	Budapest	clay	Singles 5	Giorgio de Stefani	2–6, 6–4, 2–6, 6–4, 2–6 (L)
1R	3–5 May 1932	Finland	5–0	Budapest	clay	Singles 1	Ali Biaudet	6–1, 6–2, 6–2 (W)
1R	3–5 May 1932	Finland	5–0	Budapest	clay	Doubles (with Emil Gábori)	Bo Grotenfeld / Ali Biaudet	6–4, 6–3, 6–3 (W)
1R	3–5 May 1932	Finland	5–0	Budapest	clay	Singles 5	Bo Grotenfeld	6–0, 6–3, 6–4 (W)
2R	19–21 May 1932	Ireland	1–4	Dublin	grass	Singles 2	Edward McGuire	6–3, 6–2, 6–4 (W)
2R	19–21 May 1932	Ireland	1–4	Dublin	grass	Doubles (with Emil Gábori)	George Lyttleton-Rogers / Edward McGuire	6–4, 5–7, 4–6, 3–6 (L)
2R	19–21 May 1932	Ireland	1–4	Dublin	grass	Singles 5	George Lyttleton-Rogers	0–6, 3–6, 3–6 (L)
1R	5–7 May 1933	Japan	0–5	Budapest	clay	Singles 2	Ryosuki Nunoi	6–4, 6–8, 3–6, 1–6 (L)
1R	5–7 May 1933	Japan	0–5	Budapest	clay	Singles 4	Jiro Sato	6–4, 6–8, 3–6, 1–6 (L)
1R	28–30 July 1933	Belgium	2–3	Brussels		Singles 1	André Lacroix	1–6, 5–7, 2–6 (L)
1R	28–30 July 1933	Belgium	2–3	Brussels		Doubles (with Emil Gábori)	André Lacroix / Léopold de Borman	6–2, 1–6, 5–7, 6–3, 4–6 (L)
1R	28–30 July 1933	Belgium	2–3	Brussels		Singles 5	Léopold de Borman	7–5, 6–3, 6–4 (W)

== Table tennis career statistics ==
- World Table Tennis Championships
  - 1926 London
    - 2nd place doubles (with Zoltán Mechlovits)
    - 1st place with the Hungarian team (Dániel Pécsi, Zoltán Mechlovits, Roland Jacobi)
- International Masters Cup
  - 1927 Berlin – 1st place doubles (with Zoltán Mechlovits)

== Football career statistics ==
Number	Opponent	Venue	Attendance	Type	Date	Result	Goals scored
1.	(Austrian Empire) Austria	Budapest	12.000–16.000	Friendly match	4 October 1914	2–2	0
2.	(Austrian Empire) Austria	Vienna	N/A	Friendly match	8 November 1914	2–1	1
3.	(Austrian Empire) Austria	Vienna	1.200	Friendly match	3 October 1915	4–2	N/A
4.	(Austrian Empire) Austria	Hütteldorf	8000	Friendly match	7 May 1916	1–3	0

== Ice hockey career statistics ==
Number	Club affiliation	Opponent	Venue	Type	Date	Result	Goals scored
1.	BKE	(Austrian Empire) Wiener Eislaufverein	Vienna	International match	March 1915	14–2	several
2.	BKE	(Austrian Empire) Wiener Eislaufverein	Vienna	International match	December 1915	7–3	2
3.	BKE	(Austrian Empire) Wiener Eislaufverein	Budapest	Csáky Challenge Cup	February 1917	2–7	2
4.	BKE	(Germany) Leipziger SC	Budapest	Csáky Challenge Cup	January 1925	3–3	1
5.	BKE	(Czech Republic) LTC Prague	Tátrafüred	Grand Hotel Challenge Cup	January 1928	5–2	0

== See also ==
- Hungary Davis Cup team
- Hungary men's national ice hockey team
- Hungary national football team

== Sources ==
- Béla von Kehrling i ITTF-Databank
- Svenska Bordtennisförbundets webbplats
