= Lionel Farris =

British table tennis player

Personal information
- Nationality: England
- Born: 4 February 1905 London, England
- Died: 20 September 1986 Sheffield, England
Medal record
Representing England
World Table Tennis Championships
Bronze medal – third place	1926	Men's Team

Lionel Stephen Edward Farris (4 February 1905 – 20 September 1986), was a male English international table tennis player.

He participated in the 1926 World Table Tennis Championships.

In addition, he was a beaten finalist in the 1925/26 English Championship. He won two English Open titles in the men's doubles with Percival Bromfield and the mixed doubles with Joan Ingram.

== See also ==
- List of table tennis players
- List of World Table Tennis Championships medalists
