= 2021 Asian Table Tennis Championships – Mixed doubles =

Table tennis competition

Mixed doubles at the 2021 Asian Table Tennis Championships
- Venue: Lusail Sports Arena
- Date: September 30, 2021 – October 4, 2021
- Competitors: 66 from 19 nations

The mixed doubles at the 2021 Asian Table Tennis Championships in Doha was held at Lusail Sports Arena from 30 September to 4 October 2021.

== System of play ==
All individual events shall be played in a knock-out system. Matches in Singles events and Doubles events shall be played in best of five (5) games in all stages of the competition.

== Schedule ==
All times are Arabia Standard Time (UTC+03:00)

Date	Time	Round
Thursday, 30 September 2021	16:30	R1 (1/64)
Thursday, 30 September 2021	17:00	R2 (1/32)
Friday, 1 October 2021	14:00	R3 (1/16)
Friday, 1 October 2021	17:45	Quarterfinals
Saturday, 2 October 2021	18:30	Semifinals
Monday, 4 October 2021	15:00	Final

== Main bracket ==
=== Top Draw ===
==== Section 1 ====
Round of 64
(India) H Desai (India) S Akula	11	11	11	3
(Bangladesh) R Bawm (Bangladesh) SR Mou	5	7	3	0

Round of 32
1	(Hong Kong) Wong CT (Hong Kong) Doo HK	11	11	5	11	3
(India) H Desai (India) S Akula	7	8	11	7	1
(Indonesia) BM Pratikto (Indonesia) DO Sugiarto	6	11	9	9	1
(Uzbekistan) A Anorboev (Uzbekistan) R Khadjieva	11	7	11	11	3
(Maldives) M Ahmed (Maldives) A Nazim	11	11	11	3
(Nepal) A Malla (Nepal) S Suwal	8	8	7	0
(Mongolia) M Jargalsaikhan (Mongolia) D Batbayar	11	6	7	0
5	(South Korea) An J-h (South Korea) Shin Y-b	13	11	11	3

Round of 16
1	(Hong Kong) Wong CT (Hong Kong) Doo HK	11	11	11	3
(Uzbekistan) A Anorboev (Uzbekistan) R Khadjieva	7	7	4	0
(Maldives) M Ahmed (Maldives) A Nazim	3	4	2	0
5	(South Korea) An J-h (South Korea) Shin Y-b	11	11	11	3

Quarterfinals
1	(Hong Kong) Wong CT (Hong Kong) Doo HK	6	12	11	11	3
5	(South Korea) An J-h (South Korea) Shin Y-b	11	10	3	7	1

==== Section 2 ====
Round of 64

Round of 32
8	(Chinese Taipei) Feng Y-h (Chinese Taipei) Chen S-y	12	7	11	15	3
(Singapore) Chew ZYC (Singapore) Zhou J	10	11	4	13	1
(Kazakhstan) A Kurmangaliyev (Kazakhstan) Z Akasheva	11	11	11	3
(Iraq) A Hameed (Iraq) A Hayt	5	4	4	0
(Thailand) N Thanmathikom (Thailand) W Tayapitak	11	11	11	11	3
(Jordan) Z Abo Yaman (Jordan) T Abo-Yaman	13	6	8	5	1
(Sri Lanka) C Ginige (Sri Lanka) I Madurangi	1	6	5	0
4	(Japan) S Togami (Japan) H Hayata	11	11	11	3

Round of 16
8	(Chinese Taipei) Feng Y-h (Chinese Taipei) Chen S-y	11	11	11	3
(Kazakhstan) A Kurmangaliyev (Kazakhstan) Z Akasheva	3	5	2	0
(Thailand) N Thanmathikom (Thailand) W Tayapitak	4	5	3	0
4	(Japan) S Togami (Japan) H Hayata	11	11	11	3

Quarterfinals
8	(Chinese Taipei) Feng Y-h (Chinese Taipei) Chen S-y	11	5	8	14	7	2
4	(Japan) S Togami (Japan) H Hayata	7	11	11	12	11	3

=== Bottom Draw ===
==== Section 3 ====
Round of 64

Round of 32
3	(Hong Kong) Ho KT (Hong Kong) Lee HC	11	11	11	3
(Indonesia) RN Niman (Indonesia) N Widarahman	3	8	6	0
(Bangladesh) MA Ridoy (Bangladesh) S Sultana	11	9	11	7	12	2
(Uzbekistan) N Panov (Uzbekistan) M Magdieva	6	11	8	11	14	3
(Nepal) B Khaniya (Nepal) E Maharjan	4	6	5	0
(Kazakhstan) K Gerassimenko (Kazakhstan) A Lavrova	11	11	11	3
(Mongolia) S-O Gankhuyag (Mongolia) U Munkhbat	6	3	11	4	1
6	(India) MV Thakkar (India) AG Kamath	11	11	5	11	3

Round of 16
3	(Hong Kong) Ho KT (Hong Kong) Lee HC	11	11	11	3
(Uzbekistan) N Panov (Uzbekistan) M Magdieva	4	3	1	0
(Kazakhstan) K Gerassimenko (Kazakhstan) A Lavrova	4	13	11	6	4	2
6	(India) MV Thakkar (India) AG Kamath	11	11	9	11	11	3

Quarterfinals
3	(Hong Kong) Ho KT (Hong Kong) Lee HC	11	11	9	11	3
6	(India) MV Thakkar (India) AG Kamath	8	4	11	3	1

==== Section 4 ====
Round of 64

Round of 32
7	(Singapore) Pang YEK (Singapore) Lin Y	11	11	11	3
(Maldives) M Shaffan (Maldives) FD Ali	5	7	5	0
(Japan) Y Kizukuri (Japan) M Ando	11	11	11	3
(Jordan) Z Aldmaisy (Jordan) B Al-Wedian	5	2	3	0
(Chinese Taipei) Huang Y-c (Chinese Taipei) Liu H-y	11	11	13	3
(Sri Lanka) P Silva (Sri Lanka) B Bandara	1	6	11	0
(Thailand) P Saelee (Thailand) P Pinyopisan	3	5	8	0
2	(South Korea) Jang W-j (South Korea) Jeon J-h	11	11	11	3

Round of 16
7	(Singapore) Pang YEK (Singapore) Lin Y	5	11	11	11	3
(Japan) Y Kizukuri (Japan) M Ando	11	9	4	7	1
(Chinese Taipei) Huang Y-c (Chinese Taipei) Liu H-y	2	11	6	7	1
2	(South Korea) Jang W-j (South Korea) Jeon J-h	11	9	11	11	3

Quarterfinals
7	(Singapore) Pang YEK (Singapore) Lin Y	13	3	11	5	1
2	(South Korea) Jang W-j (South Korea) Jeon J-h	15	11	5	11	3

== Final bracket ==
Quarterfinals
1	(Hong Kong) Wong CT (Hong Kong) Doo HK	6	12	11	11	3
5	(South Korea) An J-h (South Korea) Shin Y-b	11	10	3	7	1
8	(Chinese Taipei) Feng Y-h (Chinese Taipei) Chen S-y	11	5	8	14	7	2
4	(Japan) S Togami (Japan) H Hayata	7	11	11	12	11	3
3	(Hong Kong) Ho KT (Hong Kong) Lee HC	11	11	9	11	3
6	(India) MV Thakkar (India) AG Kamath	8	4	11	3	1
7	(Singapore) Pang YEK (Singapore) Lin Y	13	3	11	5	1
2	(South Korea) Jang W-j (South Korea) Jeon J-h	15	11	5	11	3

Semifinals
1	(Hong Kong) Wong CT (Hong Kong) Doo HK	8	6	7	0
4	(Japan) S Togami (Japan) H Hayata	11	11	11	3
3	(Hong Kong) Ho KT (Hong Kong) Lee HC	11	9	5	6	1
2	(South Korea) Jang W-j (South Korea) Jeon J-h	7	11	11	11	3

Final
4	(Japan) S Togami (Japan) H Hayata	6	11	11	11	3
2	(South Korea) Jang W-j (South Korea) Jeon J-h	11	9	7	9	1
