= Samuel Fyzee-Rahamin =

Indian painter and artist

Samuel Fyzee-Rahamin (19 December 1880 – 1 January 1964) was an Indian-born Pakistani painter and artist who is known as one of the founders of modern Indian painting. One of the first Indians to study at the Royal Academy of Arts in London, he rejected his western academic training to paint in a distinctly Indian style, inspired by traditional Rajasthani paintings and Mughal miniatures. He married Atiya Begum, a pioneering Muslim intellectual and feminist with whom he also collaborated creatively. Globally acclaimed by the 1920s, his most significant work was the frescoes he did on the Imperial Secretariat in New Delhi towards the end of the 1920s. Following the Partition of India, he emigrated to Pakistan with his wife where he died in poverty in Karachi in 1964.

== Early life and education ==
Fyzee-Rahamin was born on 19 December 1880 in Poona (known as Pune at present), Bombay Presidency in a Bene-Israeli Jewish family as S. Rahamin Samuel Talkar. He studied, initially, at the Sir J. J. School of Art, Bombay and then, on a scholarship, at the Royal Academy in London where he was one of the first Indians to be admitted. At the academy, he trained under John Singer Sargent and Solomon J. Solomon.

== Career ==
=== Baroda ===
On his return from England in 1908 he was appointed the court painter to Baroda State, a position he held until 1918 and during which time he also served as the art advisor to Maharaja Sayajirao Gaekwad III. During this period he made several portraits including those of members of the state's royal family and others depicting places in Baroda such as the Swaminarayan Mandir, Sursagar and the Kamnath Mahadev Mandir. The royal portraits were displayed at the Bombay Exhibition of 1911. Fyzee-Rahamin's paintings of this period are now housed in the Baroda Museum and the Maharaja Fateh Singh Museum.

=== Marriage and collaboration with Atiya Begum ===
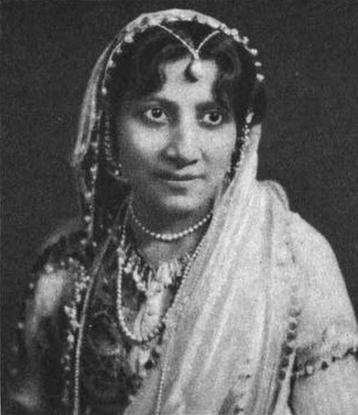
Atiya Fyzee-Rahamin

In 1912 he converted to Islam to marry Atiya Begum, a classical singer and writer. The couple took each other's surnames and he changed his to Fyzee-Rahamin. They collaborated on several exhibitions and travelled the world in pursuit of their artistic careers. Samuel held his first exhibition at the Galerie Georges Petit in Paris in 1914. In subsequent years, his works were show cased at the British Empire Exhibition at Wembley in 1924, at the Arthur Tooth & Sons Gallery in London in 1926 under the title "Water-Colors, India, Vedic, Mythological and Contemporary" and at the American Art Association in New York City in 1939 as "Modern Indian Art, on traditional lines". His assistance was obtained by the Victoria and Albert Museum and the Metropolitan Museum in reorganizing their collections of Asian art. Atiya Begum was a creative collaborator at these exhibitions holding musical programs alongside the shows. Her book, Indian Music, subsequently republished as The Music of India, was co-authored with Samuel who also provided its illustrative paintings.

=== Frescoes at the Imperial Secretariat ===
The Government of India commissioned artists representing the Bombay school of art under W.E. Gladstone Solomon, principal of the JJ School of Art, to decorate the newly built Imperial Secretariat at New Delhi. Samuel was the only artist who did not belong to this group of artists to be commissioned for the work. The project was undertaken between 1926 and 1929 and the frescoes were done using a tempera technique with colours derived from natural stone to ensure their permanence. His work here drew on the tradition of Rajasthani tempera painting and sought to emulate the flatness of the Ajanta murals. His design for the Committee Room B, now called the Fresco Room, features a radiant golden sun at the very top of the dome in the manner of Islamic art and features the takbir. The dome is divided into quadrants, separated by figures of various trees, and feature the themes of Justice, Knowledge, Peace and War which are represented symbolically through female figures holding scales of justice, men holding a globe and the image of a builder guiding his apprentice. A quote from the Persian poet, Saadi, figures below this as do lunettes depicting the seasons. In another room, topped by the smaller dome of the North Block, Samuel chose Hindu mythology with the dome containing images of the gods Vishnu, Shiva, Brahma and Dattatreya around an inscription of Om with the spandrels painted with the ashtanayikas from Sanskrit literature.

=== Writings ===
Fyzee-Rahamin authored the three act plays Invented Gods and Daughter of Ind and a collection of verse called Man and other poems (1944). He also authored two nonfiction books, Beni—Israel in India — A History and Indian Painting and Sculpture (1947). His novel Gilded India, published in 1938, is based on the unhappy marriage of his sister in law, Nazli Rafia Sultana Hassanally who was for many years the Begum of Janjira, having married the Nawab of Janjira, Sidi Sir Ahmad Khan.

=== Notable paintings ===
An early example of Fyzee-Rahamin's portraiture is the portrait of Rosalind Adler, completed in 1906 and now in the Ben Uri Gallery and Museum in London. Some of notable paintings from the years in Baroda include portraits of Sayaji Rao Gaekwad III and the princes Shivaji Rao and Shrimant Sampat Rao of Baroda and that of Sir Chinubhai Baronet and his family. His portrait of Atiya Fyzee, in the Yale University Art Gallery, is done in watercolour as are paintings of Raagni Todi, Goddess Tune (1913) and A Rajput Sirdar (1914–15) which are in the Tate Gallery, London and Ali Pather, Kashmir (1930) – a painting in blue which depicts a small figure, carrying firewood, walking along a lake in front of huge mountains, in possession of the Manchester Art Gallery. He is also known to have done portraits of Nawab Sir Mahabat Khan III of Junagadh State with his son Prince Dilawar Khan and that of the Nawab of Janjira. His portrait of Mahatma Gandhi was reviewed by Herbert Furst as a "masterpiece of characterization" while his portrait of the musician Veene Sheshanna was loaned to the 1934 exhibition on modern Indian art in London by Queen Mary.

== In Pakistan ==
The Fyzee-Rahamins moved to Karachi, Pakistan in 1948 at the invitation of Mohammad Ali Jinnah. Their house on Burns Road, Karachi was named Aiwan-i-Rifat after their residence in Bombay. A few years later, they were later evicted from this home and lived in relative poverty in a local hotel with their friends and well wishers helping pay their bills. Samuel died on 1 January 1964 and he left his collection of paintings to his wife. Atiya regained possession of the Aiwan-e-Rifat after much litigation and entered into an agreement with the Karachi Metropolitan Corporation making it a trustee to the Aiwan-e-Rifat, which she hoped would be turned into a museum to exhibit their work. There exists today a Fyzee Rahamin Art Gallery but proposals to build an auditorium and cultural centre at the site have faced repeated delays.

== Artistic style and legacy ==
Fyzee-Rahamin's oeuvre consisted of portraiture, landscapes and murals which were both influenced by and depicted techniques and themes from Indian art. Although trained in the aesthetics and doctrines of Western art he was part of a group of artists, which included such men as Jamini Roy, who rejected such training in search of distinctly Indian influences giving rise to an ‘Indian Modernism’ in painting becoming one of the founders of modern Indian painting. Fyzee-Rahamin's paintings invoked the artistic style and aesthetics of Rajput paintings and Mughal miniatures and their religious and social allegories which he transposed onto his paintings. Fyzee-Rahamin's art is thought to have reflected an artistic nationalism and stood as an alternative to the Bombay and Bengal schools of art which dominated Indian art in the period prior to Independence. He attained international repute by the end of the 1920s and was commissioned to work on the frescoes of the Imperial Secretariat in Delhi. However, by the 1950s his standing appeared to fall in the West where the Victoria & Albert Museum described him as a 'mediocrity' who 'was never any account as an artist' and that his paintings are 'considered rubbish'. Although the Pakistan Miscellany published by the Government of Pakistan in 1952 devoted an entire chapter to him, the Fyzee-Rahamins faced official apathy and neglect in Pakistan where his paintings are today housed in the Fyzee Rahamin Art Gallery which has suffered from poor upkeep.
