= Shailaja =

Shailaja or Sailaja (Telugu: శైలజ) is an Indian name. In the Sanskrit language, it means Parvati (Shaila = Mountain + ja = Born to). People with this name include:

- Sripathi Panditaradhyula Sailaja, Indian singer
- Shailaja Acharya, former Nepalese politician
- Shailaja Pujari (born 1982), Indian weightlifter
- Shailaja Salokhe, Indian table tennis player

== See also ==
- Mr & Mrs Sailaja Krishnamurthy, a 2004 Telugu-language film
