= Josefine Kolbe =

Austrian table tennis player

Personal information
- Nationality: Austria
Medal record
Representing Austria
World Table Tennis Championships
Bronze medal – third place	1930	Women's singles
Bronze medal – third place	1930	Women's doubles

Josefine 'Pepa' Kolbe was a female Austrian international table tennis player.

She won double bronze at the 1930 World Table Tennis Championships in the singles and in the doubles with Etta Neumann. Kolbe played at the Badener AC Club.

== See also ==
- List of table tennis players
- List of World Table Tennis Championships medalists
