= Tennisz és Golf =

Hungarian sports magazine

- Editor: Béla von Kehrling
- Categories: Sports
- Frequency: Irregular
- First issue: May 10, 1929
- Final issue Number: April 2, 1932; Volume 4, No. 3
- Company: Hungarian Lawn Tennis Association
- Country: Hungary
- Based in: Budapest
- Language: Hungarian
- OCLC: 922660391

Tennisz és Golf (English: Tennis and Golf) was a Hungarian not-for-profit magazine published from 1929 to 1932 by the Hungarian Lawn Tennis Association aiming to popularize the sports of tennis and golf in Hungary. The editorial board was headed by the famous Hungarian tennis player Béla von Kehrling. The publication scheduled varied, starting from bimonthly and ending monthly, but some months had up to three issues while others had only one.
