= Ingeborg Carnatz =

German table tennis player

Personal information
- Nationality: Germany
Medal record
Representing Germany
World Table Tennis Championships
| Bronze medal – third place | 1930 | Mixed doubles |

Ingeborg Carnatz was a female international table tennis player from Germany.

She won a bronze medal at the 1930 World Table Tennis Championships in the mixed doubles with Sándor Glancz.

== See also ==
- List of table tennis players
- List of World Table Tennis Championships medalists
