= Vincent Blatchford =

British table tennis player

Personal information
- Nationality: England
- Born: 9 September 1906 Dulwich, England
- Died: 30 April 1976 Nottingham, England

Vincent Harry Blatchford (9 September 1906 – 30 April 1976) was a male English international table tennis player.

== Table tennis career ==
He was selected to represent England during the 1930 World Table Tennis Championships in the Swaythling Cup (men's team event).

The team consisting of H.C. Cooke, Bernard Hookins, Stanley Proffitt and Tommy Sears finished in sixth place.

== See also ==
- List of England players at the World Team Table Tennis Championships
- List of World Table Tennis Championships medalists
