= Zehra Fyzee =

- Born: 1866
- Died: 23 December 1940
- Occupation: Journalist, writer
- Relatives: Tyabji family

Zehra Fyzee (1866–1940) was an Indian writer, playwriter and editor working in India in the early part of the twentieth century. She was a leading contributor to Urdu women's journals of the time.

Zehra Fyzee was the eldest of three sisters born to Hasanally Feyzhyder and Amirunnisa Fyzee. Her sisters Atiya Fyzee (1877-1967) and Nazli Begum (1874-1968) were also writers. All the sisters were raised in Mazagaon, Mumbai under the influence of their great-uncle, Badruddin Tyabji.

In 1905, Fyzee presided over a women's gathering connected to the Muhammadan Educational Conference. In 1914 she was elected to the working committee of the All India Muslim Ladies Conference

== Writing and editing career ==
Fyzee was a regular contributor to Urdu women's magazines, including Tehzeeb-e-Niswan, Khaton and Ismat.

In 1921, Zehra Fyzee's articles were collated into a book, published as Mazamin (Significations). Her play, Mal-i-khatun (Women's Riches), was published in the same year.

Fyzee also wrote a book on women's health, Tandarusti Hazar Naimat (Health is Wealth) in 1934.

Fyzee edited her sister Atiya's letters and diaries before passing them to Muhammadi Begum for publication in Tehzeeb-e-Niswan. She also edited Nazli's travelogue, Sair-i-Yurop (Travel to Europe), and her mother's books of poetry: Yadgari-Amira and Amin.

Zehra Fyzee died on 23 December 1940.
