= 1930 World Table Tennis Championships =

The 4th World Table Tennis Championships were held in Berlin from January 21 to 26, 1930.

== Medalists ==
=== Team ===
Event	Gold	Silver	Bronze
Swaythling Cup (Men's team)	Hungary; Viktor Barna; Laszlo Bellak; Lajos Dávid; István Kelen; Miklós Szabados	Sweden; Carl-Eric Bulow; Valter Kolmodin; Hille Nilsson; Folke Pettersson; Henry Wilbert	Czechoslovakia; Mikuláš Fried; Bohumil Hajek; Zdeněk Heydušek; Antonín Maleček; Bedřich Nikodém

=== Individual ===
Event	Gold	Silver	Bronze
Men's singles	(Kingdom of Hungary) Viktor Barna	(Kingdom of Hungary) Laszlo Bellak	(Kingdom of Hungary) István Kelen
Men's singles	(Kingdom of Hungary) Viktor Barna	(Kingdom of Hungary) Laszlo Bellak	(Kingdom of Hungary) Lajos Dávid
Women's singles	(Kingdom of Hungary) Mária Mednyánszky	(Kingdom of Hungary) Anna Sipos	(Austria) Josefine Kolbe
Women's singles	(Kingdom of Hungary) Mária Mednyánszky	(Kingdom of Hungary) Anna Sipos	(Austria) Gertrude Wildam
Men's doubles	(Kingdom of Hungary) Viktor Barna (Kingdom of Hungary) Miklós Szabados	(Austria) Alfred Liebster (Austria) Robert Thum	(Kingdom of Hungary) Laszlo Bellak (Kingdom of Hungary) Sándor Glancz
Men's doubles	(Kingdom of Hungary) Viktor Barna (Kingdom of Hungary) Miklós Szabados	(Austria) Alfred Liebster (Austria) Robert Thum	(Sweden) Valter Kolmodin (Sweden) Hille Nilsson
Women's doubles	(Kingdom of Hungary) Mária Mednyánszky (Kingdom of Hungary) Anna Sipos	(Kingdom of Hungary) Magda Gál (Kingdom of Hungary) Márta Komáromi	(Austria) Josefine Kolbe (Austria) Etta Neumann
Women's doubles	(Kingdom of Hungary) Mária Mednyánszky (Kingdom of Hungary) Anna Sipos	(Kingdom of Hungary) Magda Gál (Kingdom of Hungary) Márta Komáromi	(Austria) Helly Reitzer (Austria) Gertrude Wildam
Mixed doubles	(Kingdom of Hungary) Miklós Szabados (Kingdom of Hungary) Mária Mednyánszky	(Kingdom of Hungary) István Kelen (Kingdom of Hungary) Anna Sipos	(Kingdom of Hungary) Viktor Barna (Kingdom of Hungary) Magda Gál
Mixed doubles	(Kingdom of Hungary) Miklós Szabados (Kingdom of Hungary) Mária Mednyánszky	(Kingdom of Hungary) István Kelen (Kingdom of Hungary) Anna Sipos	(Kingdom of Hungary) Sándor Glancz (Weimar Republic) Ingeborg Carnatz
