= Etta Neumann =

Austrian table tennis player

Personal information
- Nationality: Austria
Medal record
Representing Austria
World Table Tennis Championships
Bronze medal – third place	1930	Women's doubles

Etta Neumann was a female Austrian international table tennis player.

== Table tennis career ==
She won a bronze medal at the 1930 World Table Tennis Championships in the doubles with Josefine Kolbe.

== See also ==
- List of table tennis players
- List of World Table Tennis Championships medalists
