= Atiya Fyzee =

Pakistani author

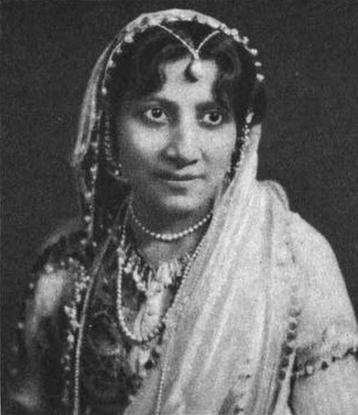
- Atiya Fyzee Rahamin, from a 1921 publication.
- Born: 1 August 1877; Constantinople, Ottoman Empire (present-day Istanbul, Turkey)
- Died: 4 January 1967 (aged 89); Karachi, Pakistan
- Other names: Atiya Fyzee-Rahamin; Atiya Begum; Shahind; Atiya Begu; Fyzee Rahami
- Occupation: Writer
- Known for: Art, Music, Writer, educationalist and traveller
- Spouse: Samuel Fyzee-Rahamin
- Parent: Hasnally Feyzhyder
- Relatives: Nazli Begum (sister); Zehra Fyzee (sister); Hassan Ali Fyzee (brother); Athar-Ali Fyzee (brother); Asaf Ali Asghar Fyzee (nephew)
- Family: Tyabji family

Atiya Fyzee (1 August 1877 – 4 January 1967; also known as Atiya Fyzee-Rahamin, Atiya Begum, Shahinda, Atiya Begum Fyzee Rahamin) was a British Indian-born Pakistani author and the first woman from South Asia to attend the University of Cambridge.

== Life ==
Fyzee was born in Constantinople in 1877 to an Ismaili Bohra family related to the Tyabjis.

=== Writings art and activism ===
She came to London to attend a teachers training college and she arranged for her diary to be published in India in 1907. Fyzee did not complete the course in London. Noted for her intellectualism, Fyzee's correspondences impressed contemporaries including Muhammad Iqbal, Shibli Naumani, Hafeez Jalandhari and Maulana Muhmmad Ali Jauhar.

Her letters to her sister Zehra Fyzee were published later with Zehra editing them to tone down references of her affectionate platonic relationship with Muhammad Iqbal

There were contested gossips about her close friendships with the authors Shibli Nomani and Muhammad Iqbal before she married Samuel Fyzee-Rahamin.

=== 1912 to 1948 ===
In 1912 Atiya Rahamin-Fyzee married Samuel Fyzee-Rahamin a Bene Israeli Jewish artist who converted to Islam to formalize his love relationship with her. After her marriage with Rahamin she traveled back to Europe and USA to visit art galleries. The couple also arranged exhibition on women's craft. She also addressed a gathering in one her visits about women in Indian history, and co-authored a book on Indian music with Rahamin and also choreographed two of Rahamins plays in London in 1940s.

In 1926 at an educational conference at Aligarh, Fyzee defied expectations of Purdah seclusion and addressed the gathering unveiled (without Hijab) to demand equal rights with men to go about on God's earth freely and openly.

=== 1948 to 1967 Karachi, Pakistan ===
Fyzee being neighbor of Jinnah in Mumbai, also closely linked with Muhammad Iqbal, senior founder of Pakistan movement happened to shift to Karachi with her husband and sister in 1948 on invitation of Jinnah who also allotted a palatial residence to them in Karachi.

They created an art and literary space at their new home which was named after their Mumbai residence.

Post Jinnah's death the couple Atiya and Samuel were evicted from their house property allotted by Jinnah, also faced financial difficulties and had to live on assistance from other relatives abroad.

== Death ==
Fyzee died in much reduced circumstances in Karachi in 1967. Her husband had died more than two years earlier in 1964. After they both died their home was open so that visitors could see their art collection. This continued until the 1990s when the collection was archived because the house was demolished.

== Legacy ==
An incomplete project of cultural center in Karachi at her later evicted property.
