= Folke Pettersson =

Swedish table tennis player

Personal information
- Nationality: Sweden
Medal record
Representing Sweden
World Table Tennis Championships
Silver medal – second place	1930	Men's Team

Folke Pettersson was a male Swedish international table tennis player.

== Table tennis career ==
He won a silver medal at the 1930 World Table Tennis Championships in the men's team event.

== See also ==
- List of table tennis players
- List of World Table Tennis Championships medalists
