= Hassan Ali Fyzee =

Indian tennis, table tennis and badminton player (1879–1962)

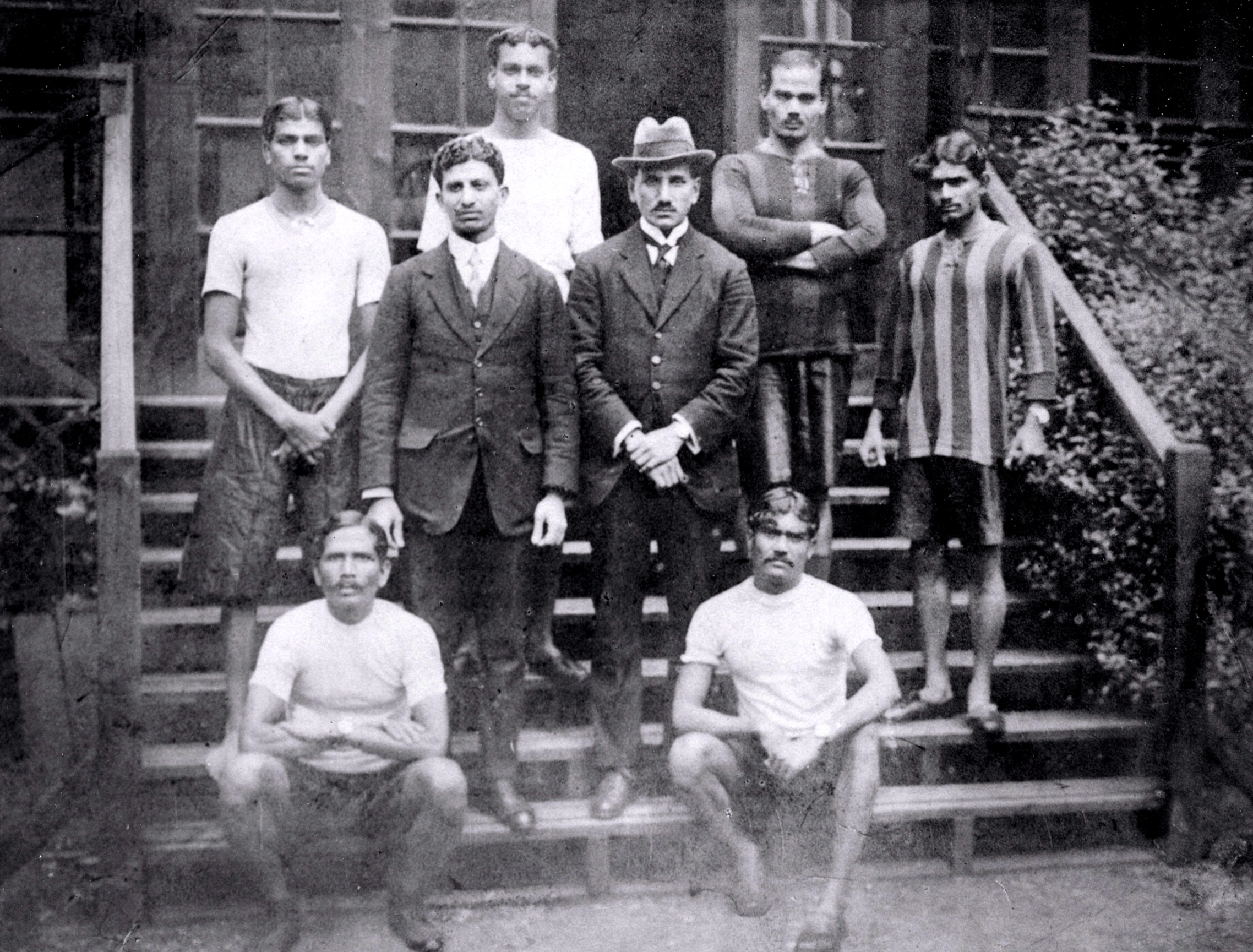
- Hassan Ali Fyzee as a medical officer for the 1920 Indian Olympic Team (middle)

Personal information
- Nationality: Indian
- Born: 9 October 1879 Bombay, Bombay Presidency, India
- Died: 1 January 1962 (aged 82) London, Great Britain
- Relatives: Tyabji family Athar-Ali Fyzee (brother); Nazli Begum (sister); Atiya Fyzee (sister); Asaf Ali Asghar Fyzee (nephew)
Medal record
Table tennis
Representing India
World Championships
Bronze medal – third place	1926 London	Men's Team

Hassan-Ali Fyzee (9 October 1879 – 1 January 1962) was an Indian tennis, badminton, and table tennis player. Fyzee was the first Indian to win a match at Wimbledon in the main draw in 1910, losing to Otto Froitzheim in the second round.

== Table tennis ==
Hassan-Ali Fyzee took part in the first 1926 World Table Tennis Championships in London. Here he won the bronze medal with the Indian men's team, in which also his brother Athar-Ali Fyzee, active in the Davis Cup, played. In 1926, he was president of the Table Tennis Federation of India. At the end of 1926, he took over organizational tasks in the newly founded International Table Tennis Federation as an assessor.

== Tennis ==
He played his first main tournament was at the British Covered Court Championships in London in April 1910 where he reached the quarter-finals before losing to Stanley Doust in straight sets. In a career lasting twenty eight seasons he reached twenty one finals winning ten titles. He won the Herga Championship tournament at Harrow tournament on grass two times (1923, 1929). He won the Northern Championships in Liverpool on grass in June 1922. He won the Roehampton Clay Courts Invitation tournament in June 1923 defeating Nicolae Mișu of Romania in five sets. In July 1923 he won the Midland Counties Championships at Edgbaston on grass.

Adaptable on all surfaces he won the Welsh Covered Court Championships at the Craigside Hydro, Llandudno indoors on wood courts two times (1928, 1931). He also won the North London Hard Court Championships at Highbury on clay in 1926. His played his last tournament was at the North London Hardcourts in May 1938.

Davis Cup

From 1921 to 1927, he completed eleven encounters for the Indian Davis Cup team. He won 4 of his 17 singles and 6 of his 11 doubles.

Fayzee's career singles match record was 223-116 (65.7%).

=== Career Singles titles, (10) and runner up, (11) ===
Included:

Legend
Won (10)
Runner up (11)

No	Date	Tournament	Location	In/Out	Surface	Opponent	Score
1	23-05-1921	Middlesex Championships	Chiswick	Outdoor	Grass	(United States) Frank Hunter	4-6, 6–1, 6–3, 6-4
1	13-06-1921	Roehampton Grass Courts Invitation	Roehampton	Outdoor	Grass	(United States) Frank Hunter	6-1, 6–1, 6–8, 1–6, 3-6
2	24-04-1922	Hampstead Hard Courts Championships	Harrow	Outdoor	Clay	(United Kingdom) Harry S. Lewis-Barclay	3-6, 2–6, 6–4, 2-6
2	05-06-1922	Northern Championships	Liverpool	Outdoor	Grass	(United Kingdom) Louis A. Meldon	6-1, 6-4
3	17-07-1922	Herga Championship	Harrow	Outdoor	Grass	(United Kingdom) Henry George Mayes	6-4, 6–4, 4–6, 6-3
3	18-09-1922	North London Hard Court Championships	Highbury	Outdoor	Clay	(Kingdom of Romania) Nicolae Mișu	3-6, 4–6, 6–0, 2-6
4	25-09-1922	Roehampton Clay Courts Invitation	Roehampton	Outdoor	Clay	(United Kingdom) Walter Cecil Crawley	2-6, 6–2, 4-6
5	16-10-1922	London Covered Court Championships	London	Indoor	Wood	(United Kingdom) Major Ritchie	4-6, 3–6, 4-6
6	02-04-1923	British Covered Court Championships	London	Indoor	Wood	(United Kingdom) Patrick Wheatley	6-1, 2–6, 4–6, 4-6
4	18-06-1923	Roehampton Grass Courts Invitation	Roehampton	Outdoor	Grass	(Kingdom of Romania) Nicolae Mișu	6-2, 1–6, 6–3, 4–6, 6-1
5	16-07-1923	Herga Championship	Harrow	Outdoor	Grass	(United Kingdom) Gordon Crole-Rees	6-4, 6–4, 7-5
6	23-07-1923	Midland Counties Championships	Edgbaston	Outdoor	Grass	(United Kingdom) Donald McNeil Greig	6-2, 6-4
7	17-09-1923	Drive Club Open	Fulham	Outdoor	Clay	(United Kingdom) Donald McNeil Greig	1-6, 6–2, 6-8
8	13-04-1925	Dulwich Gallery Open	Dulwich	Outdoor	Asphalt	(United Kingdom) Edward Higgs	5-7, 6–3, 4–6,2-6
9	18-05-1925	Surrey Championships	Surbiton	Outdoor	Grass	(United Kingdom) Gordon Crole-Rees	6-3, 5–7, 6–3, 2–6,4-6
10	20-07-1925	North Kensington Open	London	Outdoor	Grass	(British Raj) Jagat Mohan-Lal	6-3, 3–6, 2-6
7	26-04-1926	North London Hard Court Championships	Highbury	Outdoor	Clay	(United Kingdom) Norman H. Latchford	7-5, 7-5
8	01-10-1928	Welsh Covered Court Championships	Llandudno	Indoor	Wood	(Republic of Ireland) William G. Ireland	8–6, 5–7, 6–2
9	15-07-1929	Herga Championship	Harrow	Outdoor	Grass	(Japan) Ryuki Miki	6-3, 8-6
11	30-09-1929	Welsh Covered Court Championships	Llandudno	Indoor	Wood	(United States) V. Allman-Smith	3–6, 6–3, 2–6
10	28-09-1931	Welsh Covered Court Championships	Llandudno	Indoor	Wood	(United Kingdom) William D. Radcliffe	6–4, 6–3
