= 1926 World Table Tennis Championships =

The 1st World Table Tennis Championships were held in London from December 6 to December 11, 1926.

The championships were originally held as the European Championships which was the same year that the International Table Tennis Federation was formed. It was retrospectively designated as the first World Championships.

== Medalists ==
=== Team ===
Event	Gold	Silver	Bronze
Men's team Swaythling Cup	Hungary; Roland Jacobi; Béla von Kehrling; Zoltán Mechlovits; Daniel Pecsi	Austria; Paul Flussmann; Eduard Freudenheim; Munio Pillinger	England; Charles Allwright; Bernard Bernstein; Percival Bromfield; Frank Burls; James Thompson
Men's team Swaythling Cup	Hungary; Roland Jacobi; Béla von Kehrling; Zoltán Mechlovits; Daniel Pecsi	Austria; Paul Flussmann; Eduard Freudenheim; Munio Pillinger	India; Athar-Ali Fyzee; Hassan Ali Fyzee; A.M. Peermahomed; B.C. Singh; S.R.G. Suppiah

=== Individual ===
Event	Gold	Silver	Bronze
Men's singles	(Kingdom of Hungary) Roland Jacobi	(Kingdom of Hungary) Zoltán Mechlovits	(Austria) Munio Pillinger
Men's singles	(Kingdom of Hungary) Roland Jacobi	(Kingdom of Hungary) Zoltán Mechlovits	(India) S.R.G. Suppiah
Women's singles	(Kingdom of Hungary) Mária Mednyánszky	(Wales) Doris Gubbins	(Austria) Anastasia Flussmann
Women's singles	(Kingdom of Hungary) Mária Mednyánszky	(Wales) Doris Gubbins	(England) Winifred Land
Men's doubles	(Kingdom of Hungary) Roland Jacobi (Kingdom of Hungary) Daniel Pecsi	(Kingdom of Hungary) Zoltán Mechlovits (Kingdom of Hungary) Béla von Kehrling	(Austria) Paul Flussmann (Austria) Munio Pillinger
Men's doubles	(Kingdom of Hungary) Roland Jacobi (Kingdom of Hungary) Daniel Pecsi	(Kingdom of Hungary) Zoltán Mechlovits (Kingdom of Hungary) Béla von Kehrling	(Wales) Cyril Mossford (Wales) Hedley Penny
Mixed doubles	(Kingdom of Hungary) Zoltán Mechlovits (Kingdom of Hungary) Mária Mednyánszky	(Kingdom of Hungary) Roland Jacobi (England) Linda Gleeson	(Austria) Eduard Freudenheim (Austria) Gertrude Wildam
Mixed doubles	(Kingdom of Hungary) Zoltán Mechlovits (Kingdom of Hungary) Mária Mednyánszky	(Kingdom of Hungary) Roland Jacobi (England) Linda Gleeson	(England) H.A. Bennett (England) Winifred Land
