= Linda Gleeson =

English table tennis player

Personal information
- Nationality: England
Medal record
Representing England
World Table Tennis Championships
Silver medal – second place	1926	Mixed Doubles

Linda Gleeson was a female English international table tennis player.

She won a silver medal at the 1926 World Table Tennis Championships in the mixed doubles with Roland Jacobi.

== See also ==
- List of table tennis players
- List of World Table Tennis Championships medalists
