= Bernard Hookins =

British table tennis player

Personal information
- Nationality: England
- Born: 16 November 1883 Nottingham, England
- Died: 1946 Whitby, England

Bernard Lyddon Hookins (16 November 1883 – 1946), was a male English international table tennis player.

== Table tennis career ==
He was selected to represent England during the 1930 World Table Tennis Championships in the Swaythling Cup (men's team event). He was also selected as England captain for two international fixtures.

The team consisting of H.C. Cooke, Vincent Blatchford, Stanley Proffitt and Tommy Sears finished in sixth place. He was one of the four founders of the Yorkshire County Table Tennis Association in 1924 and represented Pontefract at club level.

== See also ==
- List of England players at the World Team Table Tennis Championships
- List of World Table Tennis Championships medalists
