= Massimo Costantini =

Italian table tennis player (born 1958)

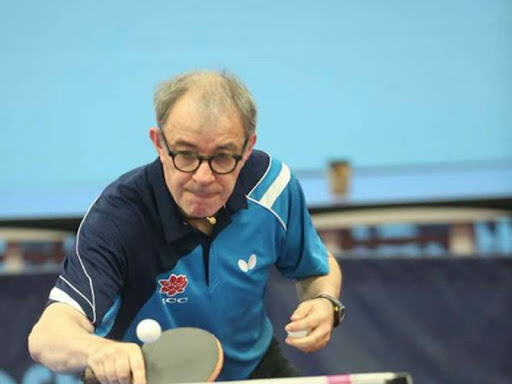

Personal information
- Nationality: Italian
- Born: 28 March 1958 (age 67); Senigallia, Italy

Sport
- Sport: Table tennis

Massimo Costantini (born 28 March 1958) is an Italian table tennis player. He competed in the men's singles event at the 1988 Summer Olympics. He is currently head coach of Indian players for Paris Olympics 2024. He first came to India to coach the Indian table tennis players in 2009. His second coaching stint with the Indian table tennis team was from 2016 to 2018 during which Indian players won a total of 8 medal, notably 3 gold medals at the Commonwealth games 2018.
