= Mikuláš Fried =

Czechoslovak table tennis player

Personal information
- Nationality: Czechoslovakia
- Born: 1906
- Died: 1944 (aged 37–38)
Medal record
Representing Czechoslovakia
World Table Tennis Championships
Bronze medal – third place	1930	Team

Mikuláš Fried (1906–1944), was a male international table tennis player from Czechoslovakia.

He won a bronze medal at the 1930 World Table Tennis Championships in the men's team event.

He was of Jewish origin and was one of a number of Czech players to have died in concentration camps.

== See also ==
- List of table tennis players
- List of World Table Tennis Championships medalists
