= Athar-Ali Fyzee =

Indian tennis and table tennis player

Personal information
- Full name: Ali Athar Hassan Ally Fyzee
- Nationality: Indian
- Born: 28 August 1883 Bombay, British India
- Died: 3 November 1963 (aged 80) London, United Kingdom
- Relative(s): Tyabji family Hassan Ali Fyzee (brother); Nazli Begum (sister); Atiya Fyzee (sister); Asaf Ali Asghar Fyzee (nephew)

Sport
- Country: India
- Sport: Table Tennis & Tennis
Medal record
Representing India
World Table Tennis Championships
Bronze medal – third place	1926	Men's Team

Athar-Ali Fyzee (28 August 1883 – 3 November 1963) was an Indian international tennis and table tennis player. He competed in the men's singles tennis tournament at the 1924 Summer Olympics. In a tennis career lasting 18 seasons from 1909 to 1934, he reached 21 finals and won 14 singles titles.

== Career ==
=== Table tennis ===
Athar-Ali Fyzee took part in the first 1926 World Table Tennis Championships in London. Here he won the bronze medal with the Indian men's team which included his brother Hassan Ali Fyzee. The same year he was elected the first president of the Table Tennis Federation of India.

=== Tennis ===
In a career lasting 18 seasons from 1909 to 1934, he reached 21 finals and won 14 singles titles. In major grand slam tournaments his best result in the singles events was reaching the third round in the 1925 French Championships where he lost to René Lacoste and the 1926 Wimbledon Championships. He participated in 15 editions of the Wimbledon Championships between 1910 and 1933.

In 1909 he played his first event, and won his title at the Wilderness Tournament at Southfields, Wandsworth, London on asphalt courts against Britain's Sydney Watts.

Ali Fyzee was an adaptable player on all surfaces, most notably taking the Essex Championships at Southend-on-Sea and Middlesex Championships at Chiswick Park, Chiswick on grass courts in 1921, the Northern Championships in Liverpool in 1922, the Midland Counties Championships at Edgbaston in 1923, and the Welsh Covered Court Championships at Llandudno, North Wales in 1928 and 1931 on indoor wood courts. He was also a finalist at the British Covered Court Championships in 1923.

His other career singles highlights 1921 he won the Herga LTC Tournament at Harrow tournament on grass 3 times (1922–23, 1929), the North London Hard Courts Championships in 1921 on clay at Highbury, London against fellow countryman Cotah Ramaswami, and again in 1926. In 1923 he won the Roehampton Grass Courts at the Roehampton Club in London. His last tournament was at the North London Hardcourts in May 1938.

From 1921 to 1927 he represented India in the India Davis Cup team, he won 4 of his 17 singles and 6 of his 11 doubles.

== See also ==
- List of table tennis players
- List of World Table Tennis Championships medalists
