= James Thompson (table tennis) =

English table tennis player

Personal information
- Nationality: England
- Born: 1889 Bristol, England
- Died: 1967 (aged 77–78)
Medal record
Representing England
World Table Tennis Championships
Bronze medal – third place	1926	Men's Team

James Thompson (1889–1967) was a male English international table tennis player.

He won a bronze medal at the 1926 World Table Tennis Championships in the men's team event. He was captain of this inaugural Championship England team and used a rubber racket.

He won the West of England Championships in 1908, made his debut against Wales in 1923 and won the inaugural Daily Mirror British title in May 1923 at Selfridges in London, and played in the Bristol league (one of the earliest clubs in the world).

== See also ==
- List of England players at the World Team Table Tennis Championships
- List of World Table Tennis Championships medalists
