= Bernard Bernstein (table tennis) =

British table tennis player

Personal information
- Nationality: England
- Born: 16 March 1899 Kensington, England
- Died: 24 October 1963 (aged 64)
Medal record
Representing England
World Table Tennis Championships
Bronze medal – third place	1926	Men's Team

Bernard Bernstein (16 March 1899 – 24 October 1963), was a male English international table tennis player.

He won a bronze medal at the 1926 World Table Tennis Championships in the men's team event.

In addition to table tennis, Bernard Bernstein also played billiards.

== See also ==
- List of England players at the World Team Table Tennis Championships
- List of World Table Tennis Championships medalists
