= Charles Mase =

British table tennis player

Personal information
- Nationality: England
- Born: 1895
- Died: 1954 (aged 58–59)
Medal record
Representing England
World Table Tennis Championships
Bronze medal – third place	1928	Men's Team

Charles Gilbert Mase (1895–1954), was a male English international table tennis player.

He won a bronze medal at the 1928 World Table Tennis Championships in the Swaythling Cup (men's team event).

== See also ==
- List of England players at the World Team Table Tennis Championships
- List of World Table Tennis Championships medalists
