= Shailaja Salokhe =

Indian table tennis player

Shailaja Salokhe is an Indian table tennis player. She was a top player in India.

In 1975 Commonwealth Table Tennis Championships, she and her teammates won a silver medal.

She is awarded with Arjun Puraskar.

Salokhe currently coaches young children for developing skills in table tennis.

Year	Ranking	Title
1974	-	National Women's Title
1976	-	National Women's Title
1979	-	National Women's Title
