= Bohumil Hájek =

Czech table tennis player

Personal information
- Nationality: Czechoslovakia
Medal record
Representing Czechoslovakia
World Table Tennis Championships
Bronze medal – third place	1930	Team

Bohumil Hájek was a Czech international table tennis player, representing Czechoslovakia.

He won a bronze medal at the 1930 World Table Tennis Championships in the men's team event.

== See also ==
- List of table tennis players
- List of World Table Tennis Championships medalists
