= Table Tennis Federation of India =

Governing body for table tennis in India

- Sport: Table Tennis
- Jurisdiction: India
- Membership: 32 state units and 37 institutions
- Abbreviation: TTFI
- Founded: 1926; 99 years ago
- Affiliation: International Table Tennis Federation
- Affiliation date: 1926
- Regional affiliation: Asian Table Tennis Union
- Headquarters: I-12, 3rd Floor, DSIIDC Industrial Complex, Near Udyog Nagar Metro Station, Rohtak Road, Delhi
- President: Meghna Ahlawat
- Secretary: Kamlesh Mehta
- Men's coach: (Italy) Massimo Costantini
- Women's coach: (Italy) Massimo Costantini

Official website
- ttfi.org
- (India)

The Table Tennis Federation of India is the governing body for table tennis in India. The TTFI was established in 1926, and was a founding member of the International Table Tennis Federation. TTFI's members includes 32 state units and 37 institutions.

In December 2022, a new set of office-bearers were elected to end the Committee of Administrators' reign. Meghna Ahlawat was elected as the president and Kamlesh Mehta is the new Secretary General. Patel Nagender Reddy is elected as the Treasurer. In February 2022, the Delhi High Court suspended TTFI and appointed the CoA after a match-fixing scandal raised by Manika Batra.

Earlier, Dushyant Chautala was the President after his election at the federation's annual general body meeting on 30 January 2017, when he became the youngest president in the TTFI history.
