= Nazli Begum =

Pakistani advocate for girls education

Nazli Rafiya Begum, born Naazli Rafiya Sultana Hassanally Fyzee (1874-1968) was an Indian-born princess who later became a Pakistan Movement activist and moved to Pakistan after the partition.

== Life ==
Nazli Fyzee was the sister of the writers Atiya Fyzee and Zehra Fyzee. In 1887, aged 15, she married Ahmad Khan, the Nawab of Janjira State, a small princely state near Mumbai. In 1908 she visited England with her husband and sister.

She encouraged female education in the state and was a member of the Bharat Stree Mahamandal (The Great Circle of Indian Women) which had been founded by Sarala Devi Chaudhurani in 1910.

Nazli and her husband were childless, and in 1913 the Nawab married another woman with Nazli's consent. After a son was born to this wife, Nazli moved to Bombay, with guards 'suitable to her rank' provided at state expense. In 1915 she relinquished a Rs 3,000 monthly allowance, and returned state jewellery, but maintained her guards.

After Ahmad Khan died in 1922, Janjira State subsequently stopped paying for her retinue of guards. In July 1926 she brought a complaint to the British government. Her complaint came to court in 1930–31, and the Janjira state successfully argued that she had been divorced. Nazli argued that a divorce deed had never been served on her, and that since she was a Shia Muslim, any divorce should have followed Shia law. In 1933 she gained the support of Mohammad Iqbal. Iqbal wrote on her behalf to the private secretary of Lord Willingdon, the British Governor. Nazli continued to press for the right to be called 'ex-Begum of Janjira', though the state of Janjira remained resistant to her claims.

In the 1920s, she was president of the All-India Khilafat Committee. After the Partition of India she migrated to Pakistan with her sister Atiya. She died in Karachi on 17 September 1968.
