= Archana Kamath =

Indian table tennis player

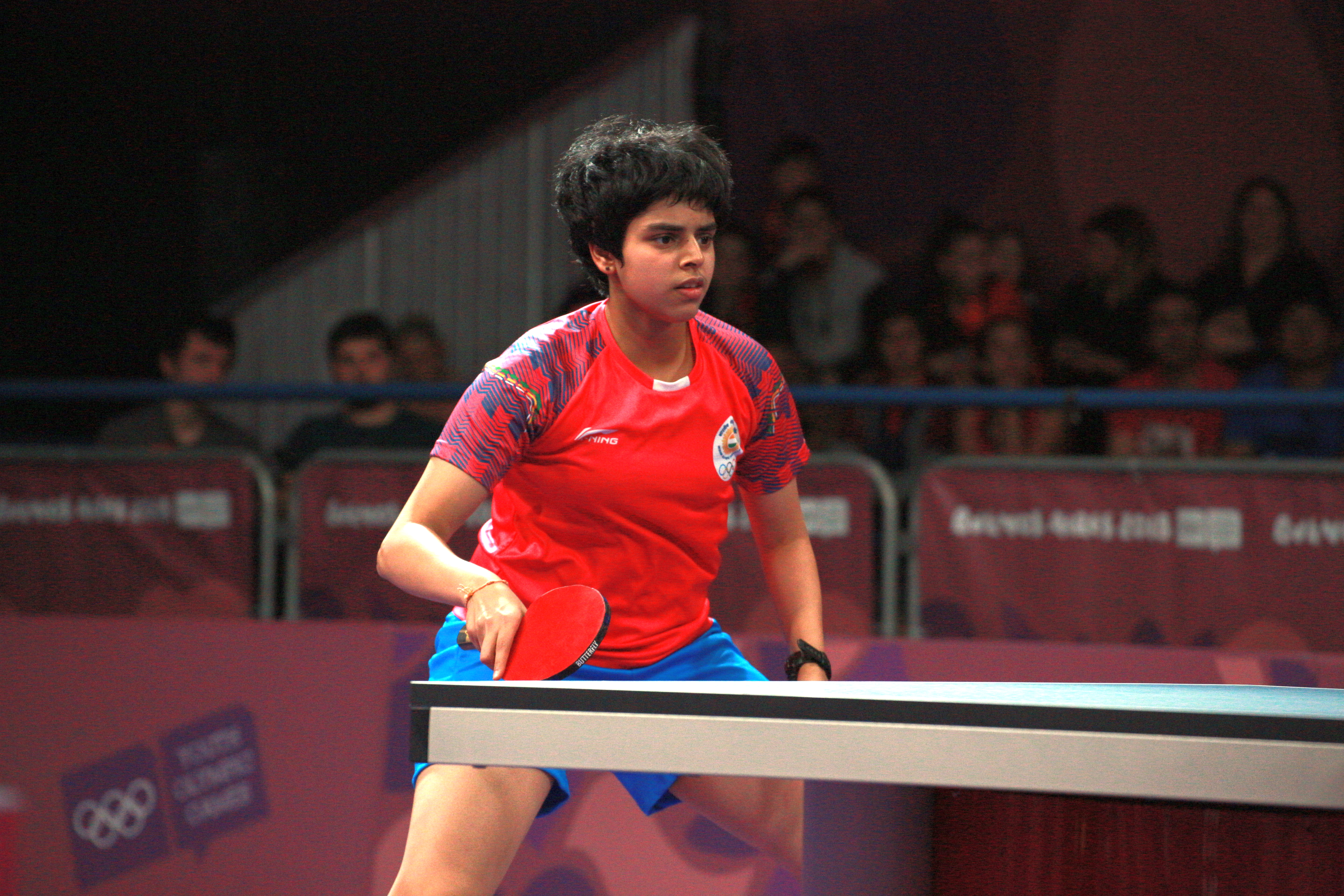

Personal information
- Nationality: Indian
- Born: 17 June 2000 (age 25)

Archana Kamath (born 17 June 2000) is an Indian former table tennis player. She won the gold medal at the 2023 National Games of India in women's singles. She was a part of Indian table tennis contingent at the 2024 Summer Olympics.

== Early life and education ==
Archana comes from Bangalore. She was born in a family of doctors in Karnataka. Her parents, Girish and Anuradha Kamath are both doctors, specialists in ophthalmology.
