= Valter Kolmodin =

Swedish table tennis player

Personal information
- Nationality: Sweden
- Born: 27 May 1910 Linköping
- Died: 4 November 1952 (aged 42) Kopparberg
Medal record
Representing Sweden
World Table Tennis Championships
Bronze medal – third place	1930	Men's Doubles
Silver medal – second place	1930	Men's Team

Gustaf 'Valter' Eugen Kolmodin (1910-1952), was a male Swedish international table tennis player.

He won a bronze medal at the 1930 World Table Tennis Championships in the men's doubles with Hille Nilsson and a silver medal in the men's team event.

== See also ==
- List of table tennis players
- List of World Table Tennis Championships medalists
