= Brenda Sommerville =

British table tennis player

Personal information
- Nationality: England
Medal record
Representing England
World Table Tennis Championships
Silver medal – second place	1928	Women's Doubles

Brenda Sommerville was a female English international table tennis player.

She won a silver medal at the 1928 World Table Tennis Championships in the women's doubles with Doris Gubbins. She also won an English Open title.

== See also ==
- List of table tennis players
- List of World Table Tennis Championships medalists
