= Fanchette Flamm =

Austrian table tennis player

Personal information
- Full name: Flamm Fanchette
- Nationality: Austria

Sport
- Sport: Table tennis
Medal record
Women's table tennis
Representing Austria
World Championships
Silver medal – second place	1929 Budapest	Doubles
Gold medal – first place	1928 Stockholm	Doubles

Fanchette Flamm was a table tennis player from Austria.

== Table tennis career ==
She won a gold medal in the women's doubles event at the World Table Tennis Championships in 1928.

Her two World Championship medals included a gold medal in the doubles at the 1928 World Table Tennis Championships.

== See also ==
- List of table tennis players
- List of World Table Tennis Championships medalists
