= Anastasia Flussmann =

Austrian table tennis player

Personal information
- Nationality: Austria
Medal record
Representing Austria
World Table Tennis Championships
Bronze medal – third place	1926	Women's Singles

Anastasia Flussmann was a female Austrian international table tennis player.

She won a bronze at the 1926 World Table Tennis Championships in the women's singles.

== See also ==
- List of table tennis players
- List of World Table Tennis Championships medalists
