= Herbert Caro =

Brazilian art critic and translator

Herbert Moritz Caro (October 16, 1906 – March 23, 1991) was a German-born Brazilian essayist, translator, and critic of art and music. He is best known for translating major German-language literary works into Portuguese, including The Magic Mountain, The Death of Virgil, and Steppenwolf, as well as non-fiction works, such as The Decline of the West.

== Biography ==
Born in Berlin into a moderately wealthy Jewish family, Caro was the son of a lawyer, Ernst Caro, and an amateur singer, Helena Simohnson. His house was a gathering place for artists, actors, and musicians. Caro enrolled in the law program at the University of Heidelberg, from which he obtained his doctorate in 1930. He worked as a legal clerk at the Landgericht Berlin for a brief period before beginning his career as a table tennis player, joining the German national team and competing in five world championships.

In 1933, he fled Germany to escape Nazism and settled in Dijon, where he studied Romance languages and supported himself by giving private courses in languages and table tennis. Encouraged by a cousin, he decided to move to Brazil, and took Portuguese classes in preparation. In May 1935, Caro and his wife arrived in Porto Alegre, where he initially worked as a peddler and she as a teacher. In 1936, he was invited by Bernhard Wolff to join a charitable Jewish society dedicated to helping other refugees settle and establish themselves, which would later become known as Sociedade Israelita do Brasil. Caro reportedly developed a lifelong passion for football and the club Internacional.

In 1938, Caro was hired by Editora Globo to work as a translator and dictionarist. The following year, he became a member of the house's main translation team, which included Mario Quintana and Erico Verissimo. Around that time, he began contributing articles to Revista do Globo and eventually became a columnist.

In 1947, he was granted Brazilian citizenship. The following year, he worked in the foreign book section at Livraria America, a bookstore whose management he later took over. In 1959, he was appointed director of the local Goethe-Institut library, which he helped expand substantially, increasing its collection from a few hundred volumes to approximately eleven thousand.

Caro received the prize of the São Paulo Art Critics Association, the National Prize of Translation of the Instituto Nacional do Livro, and the Simões Lopes Neto Medal [pt].
