= Erika Metzger =

German table tennis player

Personal information
- Full name: METZGER Erika
- Nationality: Germany

Sport
- Sport: Table tennis
Medal record
Women's table tennis
Representing Germany
World Championships
Gold medal – first place	1929 Budapest	Doubles
Silver medal – second place	1928 Stockholm	Singles
Silver medal – second place	1928 Stockholm	Mixed Doubles

Erika Metzger was a German international table tennis player.

== Table tennis career ==
She lived in Berlin. In 1929 she and Mona Rüster won the first place medal for Germany in doubles in the Table Tennis World Championships. Leading up to this win, Metzger won the 1927 International German Championships. She would control the first-place position in the German rankings in both 1928 and 1929.

Her three World Championship medals included a gold medal in the doubles with Mona Rüster at the 1929 World Table Tennis Championships. She also won two English Open titles.

== Accomplishments ==
- Table Tennis World Championships
  - 1928 in Stockholm: 2nd place singles, 2nd place mixed doubles with Daniel Pecsi (HUN). Quarterfinal doubles
  - 1929 in Budapest: 1st place doubles with Mona Rüster (DE), Quarterfinal singles, quarterfinal mixed
- International German Championships
  - 1927 Berlin 1st place singles, 2nd place doubles with Wirz, 2nd place mixed with Daniel Pecsi (HUN)
  - 1928 Krefeld 2nd place singles, 1st place mixed with Daniel Pecsi (HUN)
- International Championships
  - 1928 England 1st place singles, 1st place mixed with Daniel Pecsi (HUN)
  - 1929 Switzerland 1st place singles, 1st place double with Ingeborg Carnatz.

== See also ==
- List of table tennis players
- List of World Table Tennis Championships medalists
