= Percival Bromfield =

British table tennis player

Personal information
- Nationality: England
- Born: April 1886 Birmingham, England
- Died: 1947 (aged 60–61)
Medal record
Representing England
World Table Tennis Championships
Bronze medal – third place	1926	Men's Team

John Percival Bromfield (April 1886 – 1947), was a male English international table tennis player.

== Table tennis career ==
He won a bronze medal at the 1926 World Table Tennis Championships in the men's team event.

He was the English Champion in 1903-04 and again in 1923-24 and invented the flick-stroke, the foundation of the modern attacking He also won two English Open titles.

Bromfield ran the table tennis club in which Charlie Bull learnt to play.

== See also ==
- List of England players at the World Team Table Tennis Championships
- List of World Table Tennis Championships medalists
