= Eduard Freudenheim =

Austrian table tennis player

Personal information
- Nationality: Austria
Medal record
Representing Austria
World Table Tennis Championships
| Silver medal – second place | 1926 | Men's Team |
| Bronze medal – third place | 1926 | Mixed Doubles |

Eduard Freudenheim was a male Austrian international table tennis player.

== Table tennis career ==
He won a bronze medal at the 1926 World Table Tennis Championships in the mixed doubles with Gertrude Wildam and a silver medal in the team event.

Freudenheim was a member of the Vienna Association Vienna Athletic Club. He became national Austrian champion in singles in 1925 and 1926. In 1928 he relocated to Poland for two years for professional reasons.

== See also ==
- List of table tennis players
- List of World Table Tennis Championships medalists
