= Zdeněk Heydušek =

Czech table tennis player

Personal information
- Nationality: Czechoslovakia
- Born: 9 March 1897 Moravia
- Died: 30 January 1973 (aged 75)
Medal record
Representing Czechoslovakia
World Table Tennis Championships
Bronze medal – third place	1930	Team

Zdeněk Heydušek was a male international table tennis player from Czechoslovakia.

== Career ==
He won a bronze medal at the 1930 World Table Tennis Championships in the men's team event.

He was one of the founders of table tennis in Czechoslovakia and from 1923 he played with the Czech Sports Association and the YMCA in Prague. In 1924 he presented the sport in a show in a student dormitory in Prague, which led to the founding of the Pingpong Club PPC Studentký domov na Albertově v Praze in 1925. In the same year, the PPC organised the first Prague championship with 106 participants, (Heydušek was the winner).

== See also ==
- List of table tennis players
- List of World Table Tennis Championships medalists
