= Hedley Penny =

Welsh table tennis player

Personal information
- Full name: Hedley Ivor Green Penny
- Nationality: Wales
- Born: 2 April 1905 Williton, England
- Died: 9 March 1982 (aged 76) Rumney, Cardiff, Wales
- Occupation: Tailor
Medal record
Representing Wales
World Table Tennis Championships
| Bronze medal – third place | 1926 | Men's Doubles |

Hedley Penny (2 April 1905 – 9 March 1982) was a Welsh international table tennis player.

He won a bronze medal at the 1926 World Table Tennis Championships in the men's doubles with Cyril Mossford.

== See also ==
- List of table tennis players
- List of World Table Tennis Championships medalists
