= Winifred Land =

English table tennis player

Personal information
- Nationality: England
Medal record
Representing England
World Table Tennis Championships
| Bronze medal – third place | 1926 | Mixed Doubles |
| Bronze medal – third place | 1926 | Women's Singles |
| Bronze medal – third place | 1928 | Women's Doubles |
| Bronze medal – third place | 1928 | Mixed Doubles |

Winifred H Land was a female English international table tennis player.

She won double bronze at the 1926 World Table Tennis Championships in the women's singles and women's doubles with H.A. Bennett. Two years later she won double bronze again at the 1928 World Table Tennis Championships in the mixed doubles with Fred Perry and the women's doubles with Joan Ingram.

She played for the Herga Club in Harrow and also won three English Open titles.

== See also ==
- List of table tennis players
- List of World Table Tennis Championships medalists
