= Hille Nilsson =

Swedish table tennis player

Personal information
- Nationality: Sweden
- Born: 12 July 1905
- Died: 24 November 1961 (aged 56)
Medal record
Representing Sweden
World Table Tennis Championships
Bronze medal – third place	1930	Men's Doubles
Silver medal – second place	1930	Men's Team

Hille Folke Nilsson (1905-1961), was a male Swedish international table tennis player.

He won a bronze medal at the 1930 World Table Tennis Championships in the men's doubles with Hille Nilsson and a silver medal in the men's team event.

== See also ==
- List of table tennis players
- List of World Table Tennis Championships medalists
