= Robert Thum =

Austrian table tennis player

Personal information
- Full name: Thum Robert
- Nationality: Austria
- Born: 25 September 1908
- Died: September 1980 (aged 71–72)

Sport
- Sport: Table tennis
Medal record
Men's table tennis
Representing Austria
World Championships
Bronze medal – third place	1932 Prague	Team
Silver medal – second place	1930 Berlin	Doubles
Silver medal – second place	1929 Budapest	Team
Gold medal – first place	1928 Budapest	Doubles
Silver medal – second place	1928 Budapest	Team

Robert Thum is a male former table tennis player from Austria.

== Table tennis career ==
From 1928 to 1932 he won five medals in singles, doubles, and team events in the World Table Tennis Championships.

The five World Championship medals included a gold medal in the doubles at the 1928 World Table Tennis Championships with Alfred Liebster.

== See also ==
- List of table tennis players
- List of World Table Tennis Championships medalists
