= Cyril Mossford =

Welsh table tennis player

Personal information
- Nationality: Wales
- Born: 1903 Newtown, Powys, Wales
- Died: 5 August 1968 (aged 64–65) Bury St Edmunds, England
Medal record
Representing Wales
World Table Tennis Championships
Bronze medal – third place	1926	Men's Doubles

Cyril Mossford (1903 – 5 August 1968) was a Welsh international table tennis player.

He won a bronze medal at the 1926 World Table Tennis Championships in the men's doubles with Hedley Penny.

== See also ==
- List of table tennis players
- List of World Table Tennis Championships medalists
