= Doris Gubbins =

Welsh table tennis player

Dorothy (Dolly) Gubbins
Personal information
- Nickname: Dolly
- Nationality: Wales
- Born: Dorothy Eleanor Gubbins
- Died: 1961

Sport
- Sport: Table tennis
Medal record
Representing Wales
World Table Tennis Championships
Silver medal – second place	1926	Women's Singles
Bronze medal – third place	1928	Women's Singles
Silver medal – second place	1928	Women's Doubles

Dorothy 'Dolly' Gubbins (married name Dorothy Evans) (died 1961) was a Welsh international table tennis player.

== Table tennis career ==
She won a silver medal at the 1926 World Table Tennis Championships in the women's singles. Two years later she won a bronze medal in the women's singles and another silver medal at the 1928 World Table Tennis Championships in the women's doubles with Brenda Sommerville. She also won three English Open titles.

== Personal life ==
She moved from Wales to Maidstone in Kent, and her daughter June Evans was a county player for Kent. She died in 1961.

== See also ==
- List of table tennis players
- List of World Table Tennis Championships medalists
