= Joan Ingram (tennis) =

English lawn tennis and table tennis player

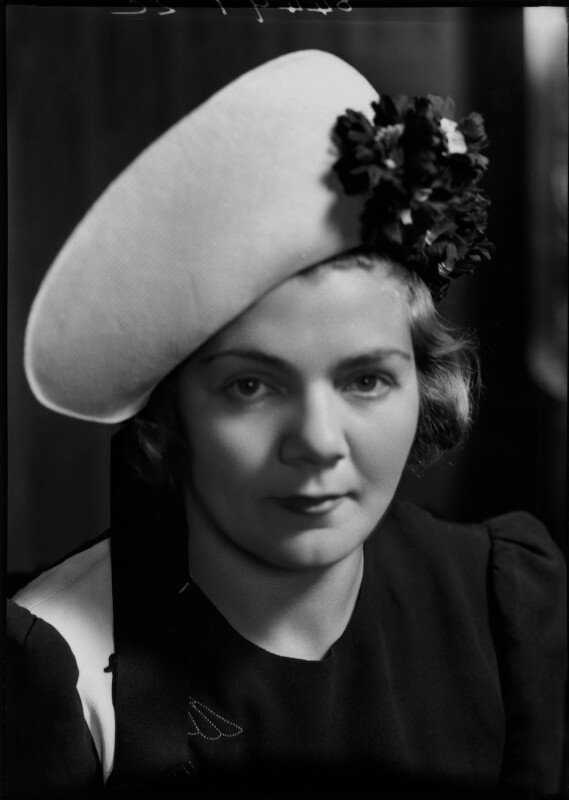
- Ingram in 1938

Personal information
- Nationality: England
- Born: 28 February 1910 Harrow, London, England
- Died: 4 February 1981 (aged 71) Westminster, England
Medal record
Representing England
World Table Tennis Championships
Bronze medal – third place	1928	Women's Team
Bronze medal – third place	1928	Women's Singles
Bronze medal – third place	1928	Women's Doubles

Joan Mary Ingram (28 February 1910 – 4 February 1981), was a female English international lawn tennis and table tennis player.

== Personal life ==
Ingram was born on 28 February 1910 in Harrow, London and died during the first quarter of 1981.

== Table tennis ==
She won triple bronze at the 1928 World Table Tennis Championships in the women's doubles with Winifred Land, mixed doubles with Charlie Bull and women's singles. In late 1928, Joan Ingram was world ranked fifth. She also won two English Open titles.

== Tennis ==
She represented Great Britain in the 1937 Wightman Cup and reached the 1937 Wimbledon Championships – Women's Doubles semi finals with Evelyn Dearman.

== See also ==
- List of table tennis players
- List of World Table Tennis Championships medalists
