= Charles Allwright (table tennis) =

English table tennis player

Personal information
- Nationality: England
- Born: 1902
- Died: 10 August 1978 (aged 75–76) Ramsgate, England
Medal record
Representing England
World Table Tennis Championships
Bronze medal – third place	1926	Men's Team

Charles Allwright (1902 – 10 August 1978) was a male English international table tennis player.

He won a bronze medal at the 1926 World Table Tennis Championships in the men's team event.

Allwright also played cricket in the early 1920s, winning the 1922/23 London League Championship

== See also ==
- List of World Table Tennis Championships medalists
- List of England players at the World Team Table Tennis Championships
