= Daniel Pecsi =

Hungarian table tennis player

Personal information
- Full name: Pecsi Daniel
- Nationality: Hungary
- Born: 1895

Sport
- Sport: Table tennis
Medal record
Men's table tennis
Representing Hungary
World Championships
| Silver medal – second place | 1928 Stockholm | Mixed |
| Gold medal – first place | 1928 Stockholm | Team |
| Gold medal – first place | 1926 London | Doubles |
| Gold medal – first place | 1926 London | Team |

Daniel Pecsi was an international table tennis player from Hungary.

== Table tennis career ==
He won four medals in singles, doubles, and team events in the World Table Tennis Championships in 1926 and 1928.

The four World Championship medals included three gold medals; two in the team event and one in doubles at the 1926 World Table Tennis Championships with Roland Jacobi. He also won two English Open titles.

== See also ==
- List of table tennis players
- List of World Table Tennis Championships medalists
