= Munio Pillinger =

Austrian table tennis player

Personal information
- Nationality: Austria
Medal record
Representing Austria
World Table Tennis Championships
Bronze medal – third place	1926	Men's Singles
Bronze medal – third place	1926	Men's Doubles
Silver medal – second place	1926	Men's teams
Silver medal – second place	1928	Men's teams

Munio Pillinger was a male Austrian international table tennis player.

== Career ==
He won two bronze medals at the 1926 World Table Tennis Championships in the men's doubles with Paul Flussmann and men's singles and a silver medal in the men's team. Two years later he won a silver medal at the 1928 World Table Tennis Championships in the men's team event.

== See also ==
- List of table tennis players
- List of World Table Tennis Championships medalists
