= Alfred Liebster =

Austrian table tennis player

Alfred Peter Liebster
Personal information
- Full name: Liebster Alfred
- Nationality: Austria
- Born: 14 March 1910 Vienna, Austria
- Died: 2000 (aged 89–90) Camden, London, England

Sport
- Sport: Table tennis
Medal record
Men's table tennis
Representing Austria
World Championships
Bronze medal – third place	1938 Wembley	Mixed
Silver medal – second place	1938 Wembley	Team
Gold medal – first place	1936 Prague	Team
Silver medal – second place	1935 London	Doubles
Bronze medal – third place	1935 London	Team
Silver medal – second place	1934 Paris	Team
Bronze medal – third place	1933 Baden	Doubles
Bronze medal – third place	1933 Baden	Team
Bronze medal – third place	1932 Prague	Team
Bronze medal – third place	1931 Budapest	Doubles
Silver medal – second place	1930 Berlin	Doubles
Bronze medal – third place	1929 Budapest	Mixed
Silver medal – second place	1929 Budapest	Team
Bronze medal – third place	1928 Budapest	Singles
Gold medal – first place	1928 Budapest	Doubles
Silver medal – second place	1928 Budapest	Team

Alfred Peter Liebster (14 March 1910, Vienna – 2000, Camden, London, England) was a male former international table tennis player from Austria.

== Table tennis career ==
From 1928 to 1938 he won sixteen medals in singles, doubles, and team events in the World Table Tennis Championships including two gold medals. The golds were won in the men's doubles with Robert Thum at the 1928 World Table Tennis Championships and in the men's team event at the 1936 World Table Tennis Championships.

He also won an English Open title.

== See also ==
- List of table tennis players
- List of World Table Tennis Championships medalists
