= Paul Flussmann =

Austrian table tennis player

Personal information
- Nationality: Austria
- Born: 14 June 1900
- Died: 8 February 1977 (aged 76)
Medal record
Representing Austria
World Table Tennis Championships
Bronze medal – third place	1926	Men's Doubles
Silver medal – second place	1926	Men's teams
Bronze medal – third place	1928	Men's singles
Silver medal – second place	1928	Men's teams
Silver medal – second place	1929	Men's teams
Bronze medal – third place	1932	Men's teams
Bronze medal – third place	1933	Men's teams
Bronze medal – third place	1933	Men's doubles

Paul Flussmann was a male Austrian international table tennis player.

== Medal success ==
He won a bronze medals at the 1926 World Table Tennis Championships in the men's doubles with Munio Pillinger and silver medal in the men's team event. Two years later he won a silver medal at the 1928 World Table Tennis Championships in the men's team event and a bronze medal in the singles.

He won three more medals at team events before winning another bronze at the 1933 World Table Tennis Championships in the men's doubles with Erwin Kohn.

== Coaching ==
He was of Jewish origin and established a club in Vienna where he coached leading players Richard Bergman, Karl Fischer, Jakob Tartakower and Ferry Weiss.

== See also ==
- List of table tennis players
- List of World Table Tennis Championships medalists
