= Zoltán Mechlovits =

Hungarian table tennis player

Personal information
- Full name: Mechlovits Zoltán
- Nationality: Hungary
- Born: 1891
- Died: 25 March 1951 (aged 59–60)

Sport
- Sport: Table tennis
Medal record
Men's table tennis
Representing Hungary
World Championships
Gold medal – first place	1926 London	Mixed Doubles
Gold medal – first place	1926 London	Team
Gold medal – first place	1928 Stockholm	Singles
Gold medal – first place	1928 Stockholm	Mixed Doubles
Gold medal – first place	1928 Stockholm	Team
Gold medal – first place	1929 Budapest	Team
Silver medal – second place	1926 London	Singles
Silver medal – second place	1926 London	Doubles
Bronze medal – third place	1928 Stockholm	Doubles
Bronze medal – third place	1929 Budapest	Singles
Bronze medal – third place	1929 Budapest	Mixed Doubles

Zoltán Mechlovits (1891 – 25 March 1951 in Budapest) was a male former international table tennis player from Hungary.

== Table tennis career ==
From 1926 and 1929 he won eleven medals in singles, doubles, and team events in the World Table Tennis Championships. This included six gold medals; three in the team event, one in the singles and two in the mixed doubles with Mária Mednyánszky.

== See also ==
- List of table tennis players
- List of World Table Tennis Championships medalists
