= Roland Jacobi =

Hungarian table tennis player

Personal information
- Full name: Beszterczy Jacobi Roland
- Nationality: Hungary
- Born: 9 March 1893 Banská Bystrica, Austria-Hungary (present-day Slovakia)
- Died: 22 May 1951 (aged 58) Budapest, Hungary

Sport
- Sport: Table tennis
Medal record
Men's table tennis
Representing Hungary
World Championships
Gold medal – first place	1926 London	Singles
Gold medal – first place	1926 London	Doubles
Gold medal – first place	1928 Stockholm	Team
Gold medal – first place	1926 London	Team
Silver medal – second place	1926 London	Mixed Doubles
Bronze medal – third place	1928 Stockholm	Doubles

Roland Jacobi (9 March 1893 – 22 May 1951) was a male international table tennis player from Hungary.

He was the first ever men's singles world champion at the 1926 World Table Tennis Championships and won six medals in singles, doubles and team events in the World Table Tennis Championships between 1926 and 1928.

== See also ==
- List of table tennis players
- List of World Table Tennis Championships medalists
