= 1925 Wimbledon Championships – Men's doubles =

Men's doubles
- 1925 Wimbledon Championships

Final
- Champions: (France) Jean Borotra (France) René Lacoste
- Runners-up: (United States) Raymond Casey (United States) John Hennessey
- Score: 6–4, 11–9, 4–6, 1–6, 6–3

Details
- Draw: 64 (4 Q )
- Seeds: –

Events
Singles	men	women		boys	girls
Doubles	men	women	mixed	boys	girls
← 1924 ·	Wimbledon Championships	· 1926 →

Frank Hunter and Vincent Richards were the defending champions, but did not participate.

Jean Borotra and René Lacoste defeated Raymond Casey and John Hennessey in the final, 6–4, 11–9, 4–6, 1–6, 6–3 to win the gentlemen's doubles tennis title at the 1925 Wimbledon Championships.

== Draw ==
=== Key ===
- Q = Qualifier
- WC = Wild card
- LL = Lucky loser
- Alt = Alternate
- ITF = ITF entry
- PR = Protected ranking
- SR = Special ranking
- SE = Special exempt
- JE = Junior exempt
- JR = Junior Accelerator Programme entrant
- CO = College Accelerator Programme entrant
- NG = Next Gen Accelerator Program entrant
- w/o = Walkover
- r = Retired
- d = Defaulted

=== Finals ===
Quarterfinals
(Republic of Ireland) Louis Meldon (Republic of Ireland) Charles Scroope	6	3	2	4
(France) Jacques Brugnon (France) Henri Cochet	2	6	6	6
(United States) Raymond Casey (United States) John Hennessey	6	4	6	6
(United Kingdom) Leighton Crawford (New Zealand) Frank Fisher	4	6	0	1
(United Kingdom) Arthur Berger (United Kingdom) HF Hunt	3	3	1
(France) Jean Borotra (France) René Lacoste	6	6	6
(Hungary) Béla von Kehrling (Italy) Uberto de Morpurgo	5	5	6	6	6
(Australia) James Anderson (United Kingdom) Randolph Lycett	7	7	4	3	3

Semifinals
(France) Jacques Brugnon (France) Henri Cochet	5	7	7	4
(United States) Raymond Casey (United States) John Hennessey	7	5	9	6
(France) Jean Borotra (France) René Lacoste	11	7	6	6
(Hungary) Béla von Kehrling (Italy) Uberto de Morpurgo	9	9	1	1

Final
(United States) Raymond Casey (United States) John Hennessey	4	9	6	6	3
(France) Jean Borotra (France) René Lacoste	6	11	4	1	6

=== Top half ===
==== Section 1 ====
First round
(India) DM Bhalla (India) R Jagmohan	2	0	3
(United Kingdom) Brian Gilbert (United Kingdom) Noel Turnbull	6	6	6
(United States) Louis Dailey (United Kingdom) Frank Jarvis	3	7	6	6	6
(United Kingdom) Scotter Owen (United Kingdom) Francis Stowe	6	9	3	4	3
(New Zealand) William Melody (New Zealand) J Nicholson	1	6	3	3
Q	(United Kingdom) Turner Cole (United Kingdom) RC Wackett	6	2	6	6
(Republic of Ireland) Louis Meldon (Republic of Ireland) Charles Scroope	6	3	4	6	6
(United Kingdom) Royden Dash (United Kingdom) Roy Poland	4	6	6	1	2
(United Kingdom) Charles Kingsley (South Africa) Pat Spence	6	6	6
(Sweden) Carl-Erik von Braun (United Kingdom) Lewis Michell	1	4	3
(United Kingdom) Percival Davson (United Kingdom) Theodore Mavrogordato	3	4	3
(France) Jacques Brugnon (France) Henri Cochet	6	6	6
(United Kingdom) ME Nigel-Jones (Malaysia) ENW Oliver	4	6	7	6
(Greece) Augustos Zerlendis (Italy) Goffredo de Banfield	6	1	5	1
(South Africa) Julien Lezard (United States) Jimmy Van Alen	6	7	6
(United States) Ernest Jonklaas (Australia) DJR Sumner	2	5	4

Second round
(United Kingdom) B Gilbert (United Kingdom) N Turnbull	5	7	0	7	3
(United States) L Dailey (United Kingdom) F Jarvis	7	5	6	5	6
Q	(United Kingdom) T Cole (United Kingdom) RC Wackett	1	2	4
(Republic of Ireland) L Meldon (Republic of Ireland) C Scroope	6	6	6
(United Kingdom) C Kingsley (South Africa) P Spence	2	1	6	7	3
(France) J Brugnon (France) H Cochet	6	6	3	5	6
(United Kingdom) ME Nigel-Jones (Malaysia) ENW Oliver	7	3	5
(South Africa) J Lezard (United States) J Van Alen	9	6	7

Third round
(United States) L Dailey (United Kingdom) F Jarvis	6	3	6	3	2
(Republic of Ireland) L Meldon (Republic of Ireland) C Scroope	3	6	3	6	6
(France) J Brugnon (France) H Cochet	7	6	6
(South Africa) J Lezard (United States) J Van Alen	5	3	3

Quarterfinals
(Republic of Ireland) L Meldon (Republic of Ireland) C Scroope	6	3	2	4
(France) J Brugnon (France) H Cochet	2	6	6	6

==== Section 2 ====
First round
(United Kingdom) Harold Aitken (United Kingdom) Alfred Ingram	6	6	6
(New Zealand) JA Fotheringham (United Kingdom) Richard Powell	4	4	4
(United Kingdom) Norman Dicks (United Kingdom) Donald Greig	w/o
(United Kingdom) Gordon Crole-Rees (United Kingdom) Harry Lewis-Barclay
(United Kingdom) George Fletcher (United Kingdom) Leonard West	7	6	6
(Netherlands) Marinus van der Feen (Netherlands) Gerard Leembruggen	5	2	2
(Australia) Rodney Heath (Australia) Roy Taylor	4	10	3	2
(United States) Raymond Casey (United States) John Hennessey	6	8	6	6
(Netherlands) Cornelis Bryan (Netherlands) Hendrik Timmer	6	6	6
(United Kingdom) SR Cargill (United Kingdom) HA Lake	2	0	2
Q	(United Kingdom) Lionel Alderson (United Kingdom) EH Carr	4	4	6	1
(United Kingdom) Leighton Crawford (New Zealand) F Fisher	6	6	4	6
(United Kingdom) Colin Gregory (United Kingdom) Reginald Knight	6	7	3	11
(Portugal) Antonio Casanovas (United Kingdom) Mark Hick	3	5	6	9
A Holm-Smith (United Kingdom) Keats Lester	4	8	7	6
(Brazil) Nelson Cruz (United Kingdom) Eric Portlock	6	6	5	2

Second round
(United Kingdom) H Aitken (United Kingdom) A Ingram	10	3	4	6	4
(United Kingdom) G Crole-Rees (United Kingdom) H Lewis-Barclay	8	6	6	3	6
(United Kingdom) G Fletcher (United Kingdom) L West	3	0	2
(United States) R Casey (United States) J Hennessey	6	6	6
(Netherlands) C Bryan (Netherlands) H Timmer	3	7	4	9
(United Kingdom) FRL Crawford (New Zealand) F Fisher	6	5	6	11
(United Kingdom) C Gregory (United Kingdom) R Knight	10	5	5	6	6
A Holm-Smith (United Kingdom) K Lester	8	7	7	4	2

Third round
(United Kingdom) G Crole-Rees (United Kingdom) H Lewis-Barclay	10	3	3	4
(United States) R Casey (United States) J Hennessey	8	6	6	6
(United Kingdom) FRL Crawford (New Zealand) F Fisher	6	6	6
(United Kingdom) C Gregory (United Kingdom) R Knight	1	2	0

Quarterfinals
(United States) R Casey (United States) J Hennessey	6	4	6	6
(United Kingdom) FRL Crawford (New Zealand) F Fisher	4	6	0	1

The nationality of A Holm-Smith is unknown.

=== Bottom half ===
==== Section 3 ====
First round
(United Kingdom) St John Evers (United Kingdom) George Golding	6	2	1	4
(United Kingdom) Arthur Berger (United Kingdom) HF Hunt	2	6	6	6
(United Kingdom) DL Craig (United Kingdom) WT Tucker	2	3	6	6	6
(United Kingdom) Arthur Gore (United Kingdom) JG Hogan	6	6	0	4	4
(United Kingdom) J Duminy (United Kingdom) Charles Roupell	6	8	2	5	4
(United Kingdom) Ian Collins (United Kingdom) WEN Kelly	4	6	6	7	6
(United Kingdom) Ambrose Dudley (United Kingdom) Jack Hillyard	12	3	4	3
LL	(United Kingdom) W Irwin (United Kingdom) Bill Swinden	10	6	6	6
(India) Hassan Ali Fyzee (India) Jagat Mohan Lal	6	3	6	3
(France) Jean Borotra (France) René Lacoste	2	6	8	6
Q	(Australia) LJ Carr (Australia) L Darby	3	6	1	1
(Switzerland) Maurice Ferrier (France) Roger George	6	4	6	6
(United States) Brooks Fenno (United States) Lucien Williams	6	6	5	7	8
(United Kingdom) Cyril Eltringham (South Africa) Gerald Sherwell	4	3	7	9	6
(United Kingdom) Maurice Summerson (United Kingdom) Cecil Tindell-Green	4	9	3
(United Kingdom) Leslie Godfree (United Kingdom) Patrick Wheatley	6	11	6

Second round
(United Kingdom) A Berger (United Kingdom) HF Hunt	6	6	6
(United Kingdom) DL Craig (United Kingdom) WT Tucker	1	3	4
(United Kingdom) I Collins (United Kingdom) WEN Kelly	4	5	3
LL	(United Kingdom) W Irwin (United Kingdom) W Swinden	6	7	6
(France) J Borotra (France) R Lacoste	2	6	6	6
(Switzerland) M Ferrier (France) R George	6	2	2	3
(United States) B Fenno (United States) L Williams	4	2	0
(United Kingdom) L Godfree (United Kingdom) P Wheatley	6	6	6

Third round
(United Kingdom) A Berger (United Kingdom) HF Hunt	6	6	2	4	7
LL	(United Kingdom) W Irwin (United Kingdom) W Swinden	3	1	6	6	5
(France) J Borotra (France) R Lacoste	6	9	10
(United Kingdom) L Godfree (United Kingdom) P Wheatley	2	7	8

Quarterfinals
(United Kingdom) A Berger (United Kingdom) HF Hunt	3	3	1
(France) J Borotra (France) R Lacoste	6	6	6

==== Section 4 ====
First round
(United Kingdom) Leonard Lyle (United Kingdom) Albert Prebble	3	4	4
(United States) Chuck Garland (United States) Lawrence Rice	6	6	6
(India) Syed Mohammad Hadi (India) Sydney Jacob	6	6	7
(United States) JP Carleton (Switzerland) Hector Fisher	1	4	5
(United Kingdom) George Cholmondeley (Canada) Henry Mayes	2	3	6
(United Kingdom) Cyril Eames (United Kingdom) Teddy Higgs	6	6	8
(Hungary) Béla von Kehrling (Italy) Uberto de Morpurgo	6	6	6
(India) Eric Andreae (France) E Vuillemin	1	1	2
(Sweden) Marcus Wallenberg (Belgium) Jean Washer	6	8	5	12
(United Kingdom) Howard Gaunt (United States) Donald Stralem	1	6	7	10
(Australia) James Anderson (United Kingdom) Randolph Lycett	6	6	6
(United Kingdom) Ernest Lamb (Romania) Nicolae Mișu	3	0	1
(United Kingdom) John Pennycuick (United Kingdom) Douglas Powell	7	2	12	3
(United Kingdom) Harvey Mackintosh (United Kingdom) WB Stott	9	6	10	6
(Australia) LC Terrey (Australia) Harold Utz
R Chose (France) André Gobert	w/o

Second round
(United States) C Garland (United States) L Rice	4	7	6	4	6
(India) SM Hadi (India) S Jacob	6	5	4	6	2
(United Kingdom) C Eames (United Kingdom) E Higgs	4	4	6
(Hungary) B von Kehrling (Italy) H de Morpurgo	6	6	8
(Sweden) M Wallenberg (Belgium) J Washer	2	6	5	8	3
(Australia) J Anderson (United Kingdom) R Lycett	6	2	7	6	6
(United Kingdom) H Mackintosh (United Kingdom) WB Stott	3	6	4	6	7
(Australia) LC Terrey (Australia) H Utz	6	2	6	4	5

Third round
(United States) C Garland (United States) L Rice	8	4	5	2
(Hungary) B von Kehrling (Italy) H de Morpurgo	6	6	7	6
(Australia) J Anderson (United Kingdom) R Lycett
(United Kingdom) H Mackintosh (United Kingdom) WB Stott	w/o

Quarterfinals
(Hungary) B von Kehrling (Italy) H de Morpurgo	5	5	6	6	6
(Australia) J Anderson (United Kingdom) R Lycett	7	7	4	3	3

The nationality of R Chose is unknown.
