= 1925 Wimbledon Championships – Men's singles =

Men's singles
- 1925 Wimbledon Championships

Final
- Champion: (France) René Lacoste
- Runner-up: (France) Jean Borotra
- Score: 6–3, 6–3, 4–6, 8–6

Details
- Draw: 128 (8Q)
- Seeds: –

Events
Singles	men	women		boys	girls
Doubles	men	women	mixed	boys	girls
- Wimbledon Championships

René Lacoste defeated defending champion Jean Borotra 6–3, 6–3, 4–6, 8–6 in the final to win the gentlemen's singles tennis title at the 1925 Wimbledon Championships.

== Draw ==
Key

- Q = Qualifier
- WC = Wild card
- LL = Lucky loser
- Alt = Alternate
- ITF = ITF entry
- PR = Protected ranking
- SR = Special ranking
- SE = Special exempt
- JE = Junior exempt
- JR = Junior Accelerator Programme entrant
- CO = College Accelerator Programme entrant
- NG = Next Gen Accelerator Program entrant
- w/o = Walkover
- r = Retired
- d = Defaulted

=== Finals ===
Quarterfinals
(France) Henri Cochet	7	4	6	6	6
(United States) John Hennessey	9	6	1	3	0
(France) Jean Borotra	6	5	6	6
(United Kingdom) Harry Lewis-Barclay	3	7	3	3
(Switzerland) Hector Fisher	1	1	4
(Australia) James Anderson	6	6	6
(France) René Lacoste	6	6	6	6
(India) Sydney Jacob	3	8	0	4

Semifinals
(France) Henri Cochet	7	6	4	1
(France) Jean Borotra	5	8	6	6
(Australia) James Anderson	4	5	1
(France) René Lacoste	6	7	6

Final
(France) Jean Borotra	3	3	6	6
(France) René Lacoste	6	6	4	8

=== Top half ===
==== Section 1 ====
First round
(United Kingdom) WEN Kelly	6	5	6	6
(United Kingdom) Ulysses Williams	4	7	4	4
(United Kingdom) Brame Hillyard
(United Kingdom) E Salmond	w/o
(France) Henri Cochet	6	6	6
(United Kingdom) Colin Gregory	4	2	0
(Greece) Augustos Zerlendis	4	6	6	6
Q	(United Kingdom) Neville Deed	6	2	2	2
(India) R Jagmohan
(France) André Gobert	w/o
(India) Jagat Mohan Lal	6	6	4	6
(United States) Ernest Jonklaas	4	3	6	2
(United Kingdom) Alfred Ingram	4	6	6	6
(United Kingdom) Douglas Powell	6	3	1	1
(United Kingdom) John Pennycuick	6	7	6
(United Kingdom) Hew Stoker	3	5	2

Second round
(United Kingdom) WEN Kelly	2	3	15	0
(United Kingdom) B Hillyard	6	6	13	6
(France) H Cochet	6	6	3	6
(Greece) A Zerlendis	3	1	6	0
(India) R Jagmohan	2	1	3
(India) J Mohan Lal	6	6	6
(United Kingdom) A Ingram	6	4	3	1
(United Kingdom) J Pennycuick	2	6	6	6

Third round
(United Kingdom) B Hillyard	6	3	6
(France) H Cochet	8	6	8
(India) J Mohan Lal	6	6	6
(United Kingdom) J Pennycuick	2	2	3

Fourth round
(France) H Cochet	6	1	6	6
(India) J Mohan Lal	2	6	2	3

==== Section 2 ====
First round
(United Kingdom) Frank Jarvis	8	6	10
Q	(New Zealand) JF Park	6	4	8
Q	(United Kingdom) Fassett Burnett	1	6	1	1
(United Kingdom) Gordon Lowe	6	4	6	6
(United Kingdom) Nigel Sharpe	2	6	6	6
(United Kingdom) Leslie Godfree	6	4	2	1
(India) Athar-Ali Fyzee	3	3	6	3
(United Kingdom) Cecil Tindell-Green	6	6	4	6
(United Kingdom) Gordon Crole-Rees	8	7	6
(United Kingdom) Leighton Crawford	6	5	3
(United Kingdom) Charles Kingsley	6	6	6
(Australia) LC Terrey	2	2	2
(Netherlands) Marinus van der Feen	3	6	1	2
(United States) John Hennessey	6	4	6	6
(United Kingdom) Norman Dicks	6	3	6	6
(United Kingdom) Charles Roupell	2	6	4	0

Second round
(United Kingdom) F Jarvis	0	3	4
(United Kingdom) G Lowe	6	6	6
(United Kingdom) N Sharpe	2	2	6	4
(United Kingdom) C Tindell-Green	6	6	4	6
(United Kingdom) G Crole-Rees	3	6	6	6
(United Kingdom) C Kingsley	6	1	4	4
(United States) J Hennessey	8	6	6
(United Kingdom) N Dicks	6	3	4

Third round
(United Kingdom) G Lowe	6	6	6
(United Kingdom) C Tindell-Green	1	2	2
(United Kingdom) G Crole-Rees	6	6	6	4	4
(United States) J Hennessey	8	2	3	6	6

Fourth round
(United Kingdom) G Lowe	7	6	4
(United States) J Hennessey	9	8	6

==== Section 3 ====
First round
(United Kingdom) Cyril Eames	6	6	6
(New Zealand) William Melody	2	2	1
(United Kingdom) George Cholmondeley	6	4	6	4	3
(United States) Chuck Garland	4	6	2	6	6
(India) Syed Mohammad Hadi	3	3	4
(United Kingdom) Brian Gilbert	6	6	6
(United Kingdom) GR Ashton	4	2	6	4
(Switzerland) Maurice Ferrier	6	6	4	6
(France) Jean Borotra	6	6	6
(Australia) Rodney Heath	1	3	1
(United Kingdom) Noel Turnbull
(France) E Vuillemin	w/o
(United States) Louis Dailey	3	6	6	6
(United States) Brooks Fenno	6	3	3	1
(United Kingdom) WHM Aitken	6	6	6
Q	(United Kingdom) PRR Hurditch	3	4	0

Second round
(United Kingdom) C Eames	6	3	6	4	4
(United States) C Garland	2	6	4	6	6
(United Kingdom) B Gilbert	6	6	6
(Switzerland) M Ferrier	1	3	3
(France) J Borotra	10	5	7	10
(United Kingdom) N Turnbull	8	7	5	8
(United States) L Dailey	6	6	6
(United Kingdom) WHM Aitken	2	3	4

Third round
(United States) C Garland	6	1	1
(United Kingdom) B Gilbert	8	6	6
(France) J Borotra	6	6	7
(United States) L Dailey	2	4	5

Fourth round
(United Kingdom) B Gilbert	1	5	3
(France) J Borotra	6	7	6

==== Section 4 ====
First round
(United Kingdom) Percival Davson	6	6	7
(United Kingdom) George Stoddart	4	2	5
(Malaysia) ENW Oliver	0	4	0
(United Kingdom) Arthur Lowe	6	6	6
(United Kingdom) Theodore Mavrogordato	14	5	1	6	3
(United Kingdom) Harry Lewis-Barclay	12	7	6	3	6
(United Kingdom) Monty Temple	6	6	6
(United Kingdom) HA Lake	2	2	0
(United Kingdom) JG Hogan	2	4	6	5
(Hungary) Béla von Kehrling	6	6	1	7
(Canada) Henry Mayes	6	6	2	8
(United States) JP Carleton	1	1	6	6
(United Kingdom) George Thomas	0	11	6	7	7
(United Kingdom) Richard Powell	6	13	0	5	5
(United States) Lucien Williams	6	6	4	6
(Portugal) Antonio Casanovas	1	4	6	2

Second round
(United Kingdom) P Davson	2	6	6	6
(United Kingdom) A Lowe	6	1	1	3
(United Kingdom) H Lewis-Barclay	6	6	6
(United Kingdom) M Temple	3	3	3
(Hungary) B von Kehrling	5	5	4
(Canada) H Mayes	7	7	6
(United Kingdom) G Thomas	1	2	2
(United States) L Williams	6	6	6

Third round
(United Kingdom) P Davson	5	0	3
(United Kingdom) H Lewis-Barclay	7	6	6
(Canada) H Mayes	6	6	6
(United States) L Williams	4	4	3

Fourth round
(United Kingdom) H Lewis-Barclay	6	1	4	6	6
(Canada) H Mayes	2	6	6	3	1

=== Bottom half ===
==== Section 5 ====
First round
Q	(Australia) LJ Carr	0	4	2
Q	(United Kingdom) Lionel Alderson	6	6	6
(United Kingdom) Jack Hillyard	4	4	3
(India) Hassan Ali Fyzee	6	6	6
(United States) Donald Stralem	0	3	5
(Netherlands) Hendrik Timmer	6	6	7
(France) Paul Féret
(New Zealand) J Nicholson	w/o
(Switzerland) Hector Fisher	6	6	9
(United Kingdom) Mark Hick	0	1	7
(United Kingdom) Arthur Berger	6	6	6
(United Kingdom) Neville Willford	2	1	3
(United Kingdom) Scotter Owen	5	7	4	1
(United Kingdom) Philip Glover	7	5	6	6
(Republic of Ireland) Louis Meldon	7	6	6
(Romania) Nicolae Mișu	5	4	3

Second round
Q	(United Kingdom) L Alderson	1	6	3	2
(India) HA Fyzee	6	4	6	6
(Netherlands) H Timmer
(France) P Féret	w/o
(Switzerland) H Fisher	6	6	6
(United Kingdom) A Berger	3	2	4
(United Kingdom) P Glover	0	10	1	1
(Republic of Ireland) L Meldon	6	8	6	6

Third round
(India) HA Fyzee	6	12	6
(Netherlands) H Timmer	4	10	4
(Switzerland) H Fisher	6	6	6
(Republic of Ireland) L Meldon	2	3	0

Fourth round
(India) HA Fyzee	4	6	5
(Switzerland) H Fisher	6	8	7

==== Section 6 ====
First round
(South Africa) Pat Spence	6	7	6
(United Kingdom) Roy Poland	1	5	4
(United Kingdom) Patrick Wheatley	6	6	7
(United Kingdom) Royden Dash	2	2	5
(Italy) Goffredo de Banfield	8	2	2	6	3
(United Kingdom) Vincent Burr	6	6	6	4	6
(India) Eric Andreae	6	3	8	3	3
(Australia) James Anderson	2	6	6	6	6
(France) Jacques Brugnon	6	6	6
(Brazil) Nelson Cruz	2	1	3
(United Kingdom) WB Stott	6	6	4	6
(United Kingdom) Bill Swinden	3	4	6	3
(Australia) DJR Sumner	4	6	6	6
(United Kingdom) SR Cargill	6	2	1	3
(United States) Lawrence Rice	6	4	6	6
(United Kingdom) Turner Cole	4	6	2	2

Second round
(South Africa) P Spence	6	6	8
(United Kingdom) P Wheatley	2	4	6
(United Kingdom) V Burr	0	2	1
(Australia) J Anderson	6	6	6
(France) J Brugnon	4	6	6	6
(United Kingdom) WB Stott	6	2	0	0
(Australia) DJR Sumner	4	3	1
(United States) L Rice	6	6	6

Third round
(South Africa) P Spence	3	10	2	3
(Australia) J Anderson	6	8	6	6
(France) J Brugnon	6	6	6
(United States) L Rice	1	4	1

Fourth round
(Australia) J Anderson	3	7	6	7	6
(France) J Brugnon	6	9	4	5	2

==== Section 7 ====
First round
(United Kingdom) Maurice Summerson	6	3	6	6
(France) Roger George	0	6	3	4
(United Kingdom) Teddy Higgs	4	2	2
(France) René Lacoste	6	6	6
(Australia) Harold Utz	4	6	4
(Republic of Ireland) Charles Scroope	6	8	6
(United Kingdom) Randolph Lycett	6	6	6
Q	(United Kingdom) Norman Latchford	1	1	1
(United Kingdom) Eric Hollins
(United States) Jimmy Van Alen	w/o
(United States) Ray Casey	6	2	6	6
(Netherlands) Cornelis Bryan	3	6	0	3
(United Kingdom) Leonard Lyle	6	5	4	3
(Netherlands) Gerard Leembruggen	4	7	6	6
(United Kingdom) DL Craig	6	5	2	6
(Sweden) Carl-Erik von Braun	3	7	6	8

Second round
(United Kingdom) M Summerson	4	2	5
(France) R Lacoste	6	6	7
(Republic of Ireland) C Scroope	3	2	1
(United Kingdom) R Lycett	6	6	6
(United Kingdom) E Hollins	1	2	4
(United States) R Casey	6	6	6
(Netherlands) G Leembruggen	7	1	0
(Sweden) C-E von Braun	9	6	6

Third round
(France) R Lacoste	6	4	7	6
(United Kingdom) R Lycett	3	6	5	4
(United States) R Casey	6	6	6
(Sweden) C-E von Braun	3	3	3

Fourth round
(France) R Lacoste	8	6	6
(United States) R Casey	6	4	1

==== Section 8 ====
First round
(United Kingdom) M Pan	w/o
(New Zealand) JA Fotheringham
(United Kingdom) GM Thomas	0	1	1
(India) Sydney Jacob	6	6	6
(New Zealand) Frank Fisher	3	6	1	10	3
(United Kingdom) Arthur Belgrave	6	2	6	8	6
(South Africa) Julien Lezard	w/o
(United Kingdom) Clinton McIlquham
(Sweden) Marcus Wallenberg	2	4	8	6
(Belgium) Jean Washer	6	6	6	8
Q	(United Kingdom) VS Erskine Lindop	6	6	2	6	6
(United Kingdom) Jack Weakley	4	8	6	3	2
(United Kingdom) Ambrose Dudley	0	2	2
(Italy) Uberto de Morpurgo	6	6	6
(South Africa) Gerald Sherwell	3	6	7	10
(United Kingdom) Keats Lester	6	4	5	8

Second round
(New Zealand) JA Fotheringham	2	5	0
(India) S Jacob	6	7	6
(United Kingdom) A Belgrave	6	6	4	6
(United Kingdom) C McIlquham	3	2	6	4
(Belgium) J Washer	6	6	6
Q	(United Kingdom) VS Erskine Lindop	1	2	3
(Italy) H de Morpurgo	6	2	5	6	6
(South Africa) G Sherwell	1	6	7	2	8

Third round
(India) S Jacob	6	9	6
(United Kingdom) A Belgrave	1	7	3
(Belgium) J Washer	6	6	6
(South Africa) G Sherwell	0	3	1

Fourth round
(India) S Jacob	2	1	10	6	7
(Belgium) J Washer	6	6	8	4	5

Preceded by 1925 French Championships	Grand Slams; Men's Singles	Succeeded by 1925 U.S. Championships
