= 1927 International Lawn Tennis Challenge =

1927 edition of the International Lawn Tennis Challenge

Details
- Duration: 29 April – 10 September 1927
- Edition: 22nd
- Teams: 26

Champion
- Winning nation: France

The 1927 International Lawn Tennis Challenge was the 22nd edition of what is now known as the Davis Cup. 21 teams entered the Europe Zone, while 4 entered the America Zone. Yugoslavia and Greece competed for the first time, while Germany returned to the competition for the first time since 1914.

France defeated Japan in the Inter-Zonal play-off. The French defeated the United States, capturing their first championship, and ending the USA's 7-year run. The final was played at the Germantown Cricket Club in Philadelphia, Pennsylvania, United States on 8–10 September.

== America Zone ==
=== Draw ===
Semifinals; 18–31 July
St. Louis, MO, United States (grass)
Japan	4
Mexico	1
Toronto, Canada (clay)
Canada	3
Cuba	2

Final; 18–20 August
Montreal, Canada (grass)
Japan	3
Canada	2

=== Final ===
Canada vs. Japan

Canada
2
Mount Royal Tennis Club, Montreal, Canada
18–20 August 1927
Grass

Japan
3

			1	2	3	4	5
1	(Canada) (Japan)	Willard Crocker; Takeichi Harada	5; 7	0; 6	4; 6
2	(Canada) (Japan)	Jack Wright; Yoshiro Ota	6; 3	6; 4	6; 4
3	(Canada) (Japan)	Willard Crocker / Jack Wright; Takeichi Harada / Teizo Toba	3; 6	6; 4	5; 7	6; 3	8; 10
4	(Canada) (Japan)	Jack Wright; Takeichi Harada	6; 3	6; 3	8; 6
5	(Canada) (Japan)	Willard Crocker; Yoshiro Ota	4; 6	6; 3	8; 10	3; 6

== Europe Zone ==
=== Draw ===
First Round; 29 April–9 May
France
bye
Romania
bye
Hungary
bye
Italy
bye
Portugal
bye
Germany
bye
South Africa	5
Ireland	0
Switzerland	3
Austria	2
Denmark	4
Netherlands	1
Sweden	1
Great Britain	4
Spain	2
India	3
bye
Yugoslavia
bye
Czechoslovakia
bye
Greece
bye
Poland
bye
Belgium

Second Round; 6–22 May
Paris, France (clay)
France	5
Romania	0
Budapest, Hungary
Hungary	2
Italy	3
Lisbon, Portugal (clay)
Portugal	0
Germany	5
Montreux, Switzerland
South Africa	5
Switzerland	0
Harrogate, England (clay)
Denmark	3
Great Britain	2
Zagreb, Yugoslavia
India	3
Yugoslavia	0
Prague, Czechoslovakia
Czechoslovakia	4
Greece	1
Brussels, Belgium
Poland	0
Belgium	5

Quarterfinals; 9–13 June
Rome, Italy (clay)
France	3
Italy	2
Berlin, Germany
Germany	1
South Africa	4
Copenhagen, Denmark
Denmark	5
India	0
Prague, Czechoslovakia
Czechoslovakia	4
Belgium	1

Semifinals; 8–11 July
Eastbourne, England (grass)
France	5
South Africa	0
Prague, Czechoslovakia
Denmark	3
Czechoslovakia	2

Final; 21–22 July
Copenhagen, Denmark (clay)
France	3
Denmark	0

=== Final ===
Denmark vs. France

Denmark
0
Copenhagen, Denmark
21–22 July 1927
Clay

France
3

			1	2	3	4	5
1	(Denmark) (France)	Einer Ulrich; Henri Cochet	7; 9	7; 9	4; 6
2	(Denmark) (France)	Axel Petersen; Jean Borotra	8; 6	2; 6	1; 6	0; 6
3	(Denmark) (France)	Axel Petersen / Einer Ulrich; Jean Borotra / Jacques Brugnon	4; 6	0; 6	3; 6
4	(Denmark) (France)	Einer Ulrich; Jean Borotra						not played
5	(Denmark) (France)	Axel Petersen; Henri Cochet						not played

== Inter-Zonal Final ==
France vs. Japan

France
3
Longwood Cricket Club, Boston, MA, United States
25–27 August 1927
Grass

Japan
0

			1	2	3	4	5
1	(France) (Japan)	Henri Cochet; Yoshiro Ota	6; 0	6; 3	6; 2
2	(France) (Japan)	René Lacoste; Takeichi Harada	6; 1	6; 1	6; 2
3	(France) (Japan)	Jacques Brugnon / Henri Cochet; Takeichi Harada / Tsumio Tawara	9; 7	6; 1	6; 2
4	(France) (Japan)	Henri Cochet; Takeichi Harada						not played
5	(France) (Japan)	René Lacoste; Yoshiro Ota						not played

== Challenge Round ==
United States vs. France

United States
2
Germantown Cricket Club, Philadelphia, PA, United States
8–10 September 1927
Grass

France
3

			1	2	3	4	5
1	(United States) (France)	Bill Johnston; René Lacoste	3; 6	2; 6	2; 6
2	(United States) (France)	Bill Tilden; Henri Cochet	6; 4	2; 6	6; 2	8; 6
3	(United States) (France)	Frank Hunter / Bill Tilden; Jean Borotra / Jacques Brugnon	3; 6	6; 3	6; 3	4; 6	6; 0
4	(United States) (France)	Bill Tilden; René Lacoste	3; 6	6; 4	3; 6	2; 6
5	(United States) (France)	Bill Johnston; Henri Cochet	4; 6	6; 4	2; 6	4; 6

== See also ==
- 1927 Wightman Cup
