= John F. Hennessey =

American tennis player

John Hennessey
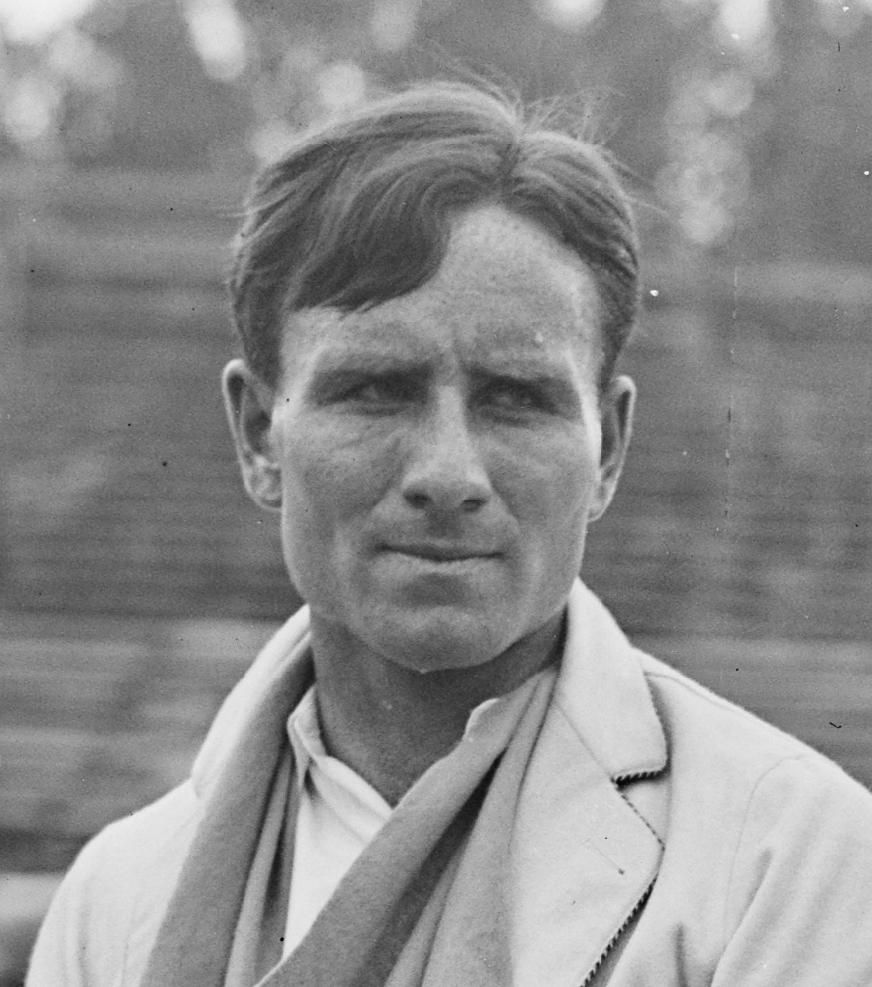
- Hennessey in 1928
- Full name: John Francis Hennessey
- Country (sports): United States
- Born: October 27, 1900 Indianapolis, Indiana, US
- Died: August 18, 1981 (aged 80) Stuart, Florida, US
- Turned pro: 1917 (amateur)
- Retired: 1934

Singles
- Career titles: 6
- Highest ranking: No. 8 (1927, A. Wallis Myers)

Grand Slam singles results
- Wimbledon: QF (1925, 1928)
- US Open: QF (1927)

Doubles

Grand Slam doubles results
- Wimbledon: F (1925)
- US Open: W (1928)

Mixed doubles

Grand Slam mixed doubles results
- Wimbledon: 2R (1928, 1929)

Team competitions
- Davis Cup: F (1928)

John Francis Hennessey (October 27, 1900 – August 18, 1981) was a top American tennis player of the 1920s.

== Career ==
Hennessey was ranked among the 10 best American players three times, his highest ranking being No. 4 in 1928. In both 1927 and 1928 he was the world No. 8 ranked player by A Wallis Myers.

In 1925 he and Ray Casey reached the finals of the Wimbledon doubles. In an era in which tournament doubles matches were considered almost as important as singles, they lost one of the most famous matches in the early history of tennis, being beaten 4–6, 9–11, 6–4, 6–1, 3–6 by one of the great French teams of Jean Borotra and René Lacoste.

Hennessey and George Lott won the 1928 doubles title at the U.S. Nationals, the same year that Hennessey lost two singles matches in the final Challenge Round of the Davis Cup against France. Hennessey reached the quarterfinals of the 1927 U.S. National championship and the quarterfinals at Wimbledon in both 1925 and 1928. A July 14, 1924 Time Magazine article called him The Indianapolis Cyclone.

He also won the 1920 singles title at the Cincinnati Open. He reached the singles final there in 1919 and was the doubles champion there in 1917 (with Albrecht Kipp) and 1920 (with Fritz Bastian).

At the Western Tennis Championships he won the singles title in 1922 and was a finalist in 1924 and 1927. In doubles he won the title in 1924 and 1926 (both with Alfred Chapin) and was a finalist in 1927 with Emmett Paré. In 1934 he won the Minnesota State Championships.

Also in 1927, he was runner-up at the Illinois State championship, losing in a five-set final to Bill Tilden.

In 1984 Hennessey was one of the first four inductees into the USTA/Midwest Section Hall of Fame. There is an annual John F. Hennessey Open tournament in Indianapolis for junior players.

== Grand Slam finals ==
=== Doubles (1 title, 1 runner-up) ===
Result	Year	Championship	Surface	Partner	Opponents	Score
Loss	1925	Wimbledon	Grass	(United States) Raymond Casey	(France) Jean Borotra (France) René Lacoste	4–6, 9–11, 6–4, 6–1, 3–6
Win	1928	US Championships	Grass	(United States) George Lott	(Australia) Gerald Patterson (Australia) Jack Hawkes	6–1, 6–2, 6–1

== See also ==
- List of male tennis players
