= 1928 International Lawn Tennis Challenge =

1928 edition of the International Lawn Tennis Challenge

Details
- Duration: 7 April – 29 July 1928
- Edition: 23rd
- Teams: 33

Champion
- Winning nation: France

The 1928 International Lawn Tennis Challenge was the 23rd edition of what is now known as the Davis Cup. 27 teams would enter the Europe Zone, while six would enter the America Zone. Chile, Finland, and Norway made their first appearances in the competition.

The United States defeated Italy in the Inter-Zonal play-off, but would lose to France in the Challenge Round, giving France their second straight title. The final was played 27–29 July at the new Stade Roland Garros in Paris.

== America Zone ==
=== Draw ===
Quarterfinals; 9 April–2 May
Taiwan
bye
Mexico City, Mexico (clay)
United States	5
Mexico	0
Havana, Cuba
Japan	3
Cuba	0
bye
Canada

Semifinals; 25–28 May
Kansas City, MO, United States (clay)
Taiwan	0
United States	5
Montreal, Canada (grass)
Japan	3
Canada	1

Final; 1–3 June
Chicago, IL, United States (clay)
United States	5
Japan	0

=== Final ===
United States vs. Japan

United States
5
Town & Tennis Club, Chicago, Illinois
1–3 June 1928
Clay

Japan
0

			1	2	3	4	5
1	(United States) (Japan)	Bill Tilden; Tamio Abe	6; 2	6; 3	6; 0
2	(United States) (Japan)	John Hennessey; Yoshiro Ota	8; 6	6; 3	6; 3
3	(United States) (Japan)	George Lott / Bill Tilden; Tamio Abe / Teizo Toba	6; 1	10; 8	6; 2
4	(United States) (Japan)	Wilbur Coen; Tamio Abe	7; 9	6; 2	6; 4	7; 5
5	(United States) (Japan)	Bill Tilden; Yoshiro Ota	6; 8	6; 3	6; 1	6; 0

== Europe Zone ==
=== Draw ===
First Round; 7 April–12 May
Switzerland
bye
India
bye
Romania	5
Belgium	0
Italy	4
Australia	1
Yugoslavia	1
Finland	4
Great Britain	4
Argentina	1
Germany	4
Greece	1
Spain	3
Chile	2
Poland	0
Denmark	5
Austria	4
Philippines	1
Norway	0
Hungary	5
Ireland	0
Netherlands	5
Sweden	w/o
South Africa
bye
Czechoslovakia
bye
Portugal
bye
New Zealand

Second Round; 11–26 May
Zürich, Switzerland
Switzerland	2
India	3
Rome, Italy (clay)
Romania	0
Italy	4
Helsinki, Finland (clay)
Finland	0
Great Britain	5
Berlin, Germany (clay)
Germany	3
Spain	2
Copenhagen, Denmark
Denmark	1
Austria	4
Noordwijk, Netherlands (clay)
Hungary	2
Netherlands	3
Stockholm, Sweden
Sweden	1
Czechoslovakia	4
Lisbon, Portugal (clay)
Portugal	1
New Zealand	4

Quarterfinals; 7–11 June
Turin, Italy (clay)
India	1
Italy	4
Birmingham, England (grass)
Great Britain	4
Germany	1
The Hague, Netherlands (clay)
Austria	0
Netherlands	3
Czechoslovakia	w/o
New Zealand

Semifinals; 20–24 June
Felixstowe, England (grass)
Italy	4
Great Britain	1
Prague, Czechoslovakia
Netherlands	2
Czechoslovakia	3

Final; 13–15 July
Milan, Italy (clay)
Italy	3
Czechoslovakia	2

=== Final ===
Italy vs. Czechoslovakia

Italy
3
Milan, Italy
13–15 July 1928
Clay

Czechoslovakia
2

			1	2	3	4	5
1	(Italy) (Czechoslovakia)	Uberto De Morpurgo; Pavel Machenauer	6; 3	6; 3	6; 4
2	(Italy) (Czechoslovakia)	Placido Gaslini; Jan Koželuh	1; 6	7; 9	6; 3	4; 6
3	(Italy) (Czechoslovakia)	Placido Gaslini / Uberto De Morpurgo; Jan Koželuh / Pavel Machenauer	6; 8	6; 4	4; 6	4; 6
4	(Italy) (Czechoslovakia)	Uberto De Morpurgo; Jan Koželuh	6; 1	6; 2	6; 0
5	(Italy) (Czechoslovakia)	Placido Gaslini; Pavel Machenauer	0; 6	6; 4	6; 4	6; 3

== Inter-Zonal Final ==
United States vs. Italy

United States
4
Stade Roland Garros, Paris, France
20–22 July 1928
Clay

Italy
1

			1	2	3	4	5
1	(United States) (Italy)	John Hennessey; Uberto De Morpurgo	6; 4	7; 5	6; 2
2	(United States) (Italy)	Frank Hunter; Placido Gaslini	6; 1	6; 1	6; 0
3	(United States) (Italy)	John Hennessey / George Lott; Placido Gaslini / Uberto De Morpurgo	6; 2	6; 3	6; 1
4	(United States) (Italy)	Frank Hunter; Uberto De Morpurgo	4; 6	8; 6	3; 6	6; 3	3; 6
5	(United States) (Italy)	John Hennessey; Placido Gaslini	7; 5	6; 3	6; 4

== Challenge Round ==
France vs. United States

France
4
Stade Roland Garros, Paris, France
27–29 July 1928
Clay

United States
1

			1	2	3	4	5
1	(France) (United States)	René Lacoste; Bill Tilden	6; 1	4; 6	4; 6	6; 2	3; 6
2	(France) (United States)	Henri Cochet; John Hennessey	5; 7	9; 7	6; 3	6; 0
3	(France) (United States)	Jean Borotra / Henri Cochet; Frank Hunter / Bill Tilden	6; 4	6; 8	7; 5	4; 6	6; 2
4	(France) (United States)	Henri Cochet; Bill Tilden	9; 7	8; 6	6; 4
5	(France) (United States)	René Lacoste; John Hennessey	4; 6	6; 1	7; 5	6; 3

== See also ==
- 1928 Wightman Cup
