= René Lacoste =

French tennis player (1904–1996)

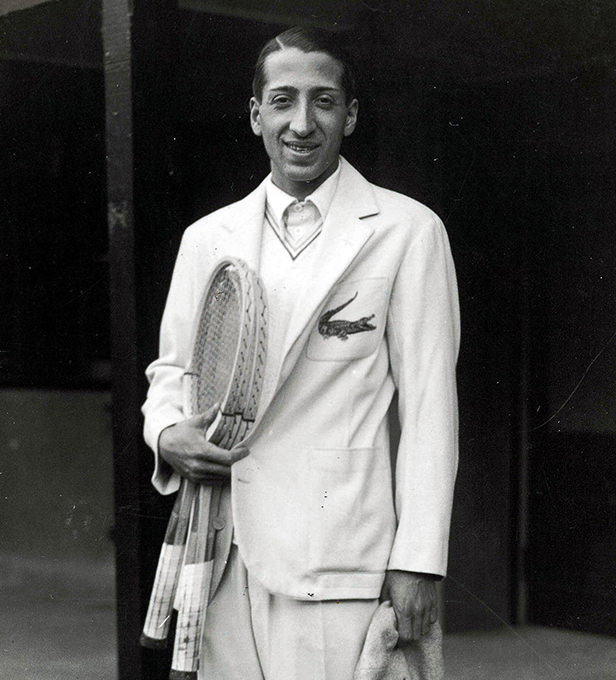
- Lacoste wearing his signature insignia, c. 1926
- Country (sports): France
- Born: 2 July 1904 Paris, France
- Died: 12 October 1996 (aged 92) Saint-Jean-de-Luz, France
- Retired: 1932
- Plays: Right-handed (one-handed backhand)
- Int. Tennis HoF: 1976 (member page)

Singles
- Career record: 262–43 (85.9%)
- Career titles: 24
- Highest ranking: No. 1 (1926, A. Wallis Myers)

Grand Slam singles results
- French Open: W (1925, 1927, 1929)
- Wimbledon: W (1925, 1928)
- US Open: W (1926, 1927)

Other tournaments
- Olympic Games: QF (1924)

Grand Slam doubles results
- French Open: W (1925, 1929)
- Wimbledon: W (1925)

Grand Slam mixed doubles results
- Wimbledon: 2R (1923)
- US Open: F (1926, 1927)

Team competitions
- Davis Cup: W (1927, 1928)
Medal record
Olympic Games
Bronze medal – third place	1924 Paris	Doubles

Jean René Lacoste (French pronunciation: [ʁəne lakɔst]; 2 July 1904 – 12 October 1996) was a French tennis player and businessman. He was nicknamed "the Crocodile" because of how he dealt with his opponents; he is also known worldwide as the creator of the Lacoste tennis shirt, which he introduced in 1929, and eventually founded the brand and its logo in 1933.

Lacoste was one of the Four Musketeers with Jean Borotra, Jacques Brugnon, and Henri Cochet, French players who dominated tennis in the late 1920s and early 1930s. He won seven Grand Slam singles titles at the French, American, and British championships and was an eminent baseline player and tactician of the pre-war period. As a member of the French team, Lacoste won the Davis Cup in 1927 and 1928. Lacoste was ranked the World No. 1 player in some rankings for 1926, 1927 and 1929. He also won a bronze medal at the 1924 Summer Olympics.

== Tennis career ==
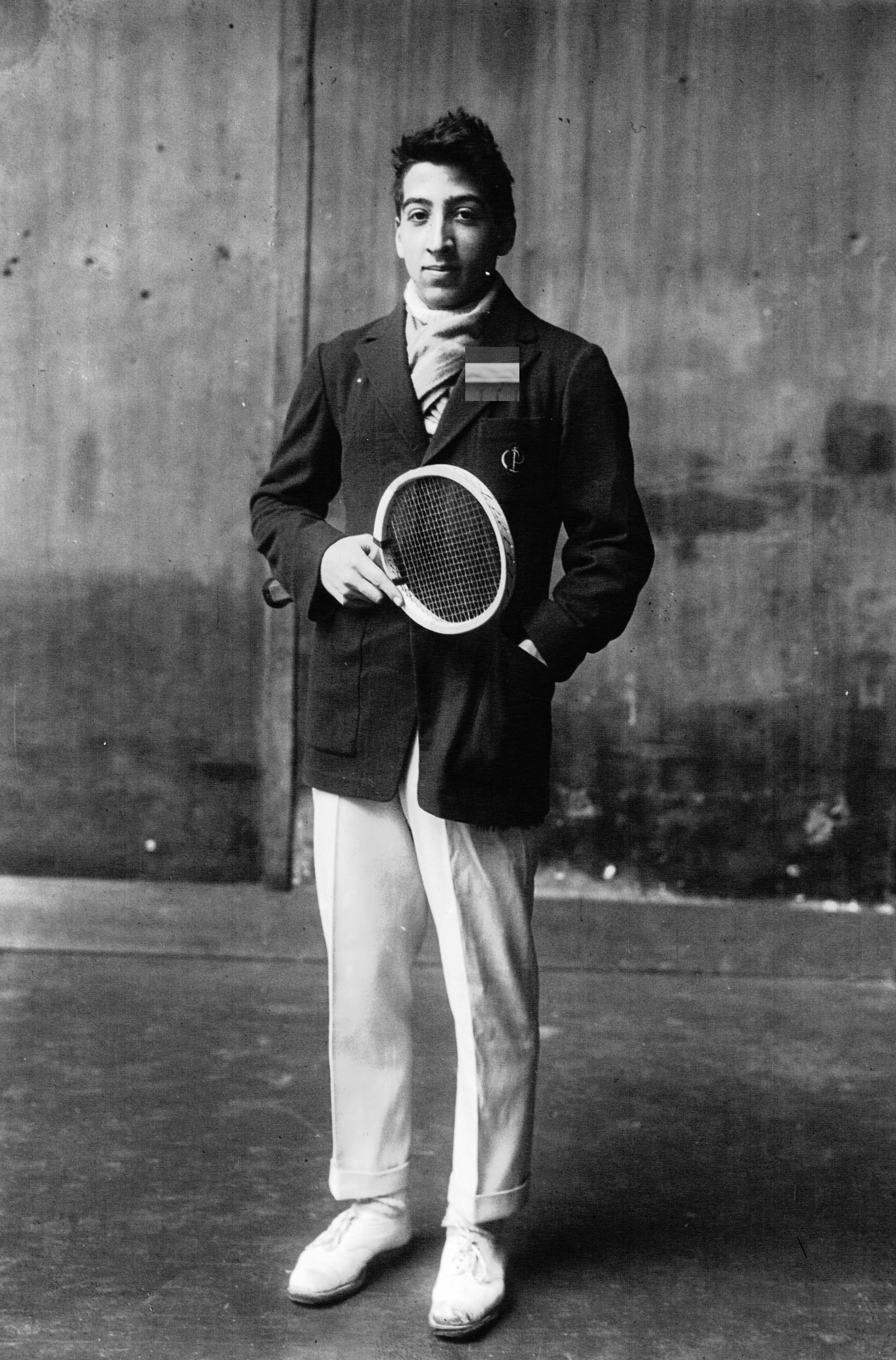
Lacoste in 1922

Lacoste started playing tennis at age 15 when he accompanied his father on a trip to England. His first participation in a Grand Slam tournament was the 1922 Wimbledon Championships in which he lost in the first round to Pat O'Hara Wood. The following year, 1923, he reached the fourth round at Wimbledon to be narrowly defeated by Cecil Campbell, and he competed for the first time in the U.S. Championships.

His breakthrough came in 1925 when he won the singles title at the French Championships and at Wimbledon, in both cases after a victory in the final against compatriot Jean Borotra. The following year, 1926, Lacoste lost his French title after a straight-sets defeat in the final to Henri Cochet. He did not compete at Wimbledon that year, but in September he won the U.S. National Championships title against Borotra. He was ranked No. 1 for 1926 by A. Wallis Myers, tennis correspondent of The Daily Telegraph, Bill Tilden, Suzanne Lenglen and Stanley Doust (Daily Mail).

In 1927, dubbed "The finest year in tennis history" by E. Digby Baltzell, Lacoste was part of the French team that captured the Davis Cup from the United States, ending the latter's 6-year title run. The final was played at the Germantown Cricket Club in Philadelphia and Lacoste won both his singles matches against Bill Johnston and Bill Tilden. He played Tilden in two Grand Slam tournament finals that year and won both of them. At the French Championships he was victorious in five sets; at the U.S. National Championships he defended his title and denied Tilden his seventh U.S. title by winning in straight sets, although he survived setpoints in the first and third set and was down a break in the second. At Wimbledon, Lacoste lost a five-set semifinal to Borotra. He was ranked No. 1 by A. Wallis Myers, Émile Deve, U.S. ranking committee president, Marcel Berger, (L'Opinion), Jean Samazeuilh (Le Miroir des sports) and Henri Cochet.

In 1928 Lacoste lost his French title after a four-set loss in the final against Cochet. He took revenge by beating Cochet in the final of the Wimbledon Championships after having defeated Tilden in a five-set semifinal. The Challenge Round of the 1928 Davis Cup against the United States was played at the Stade Roland Garros in Paris on 27–29 July. The stadium was specifically constructed to host France's first defense of the Davis Cup. Lacoste lost the first rubber in a five-set match to Tilden but France won the remaining rubbers to defeat the challengers 4–1 and retain the cup. Lacoste did not participate in the 1928 U.S. Championships.

Between 1923 and 1928 Lacoste played 51 Davis Cup matches for France in 26 ties and compiled a record of 32–8 in singles and 8–3 in doubles.

The only major championship Lacoste played in 1929 was the French and he won his seventh, and last, Grand Slam singles title after a tight five-set final against Jean Borotra. Failing health, including respiratory disease, led to his withdrawal from competitive tennis in 1929. He would make a brief comeback at the 1932 French Championships, where he defeated reigning Wimbledon champion Sidney Wood in the third round, but lost in the fourth to Harry Lee. He was the non-playing captain of the French Davis Cup team in 1932 and 1933.

The Four Musketeers were inducted simultaneously into the International Tennis Hall of Fame, in Newport, Rhode Island, in 1976. In his 1979 autobiography, Jack Kramer, the long-time tennis promoter and great player himself, included Lacoste in his list of the 21 greatest players of all time. (Note: Writing in 1979, Kramer considered the best player ever to have been either Don Budge (for consistent play) or Ellsworth Vines (at the height of his game). The next four best were, chronologically, Bill Tilden, Fred Perry, Bobby Riggs, and Pancho Gonzales. After these six came the "second echelon" of Rod Laver, Lew Hoad, Ken Rosewall, Gottfried von Cramm, Ted Schroeder, Jack Crawford, Pancho Segura, Frank Sedgman, Tony Trabert, John Newcombe, Arthur Ashe, Stan Smith, Björn Borg, and Jimmy Connors. He felt unable to rank Henri Cochet and René Lacoste accurately, but he felt they were among the very best.)

In 1928 Lacoste wrote a book titled Lacoste on Tennis.

There are numerous explanations of why Lacoste was originally nicknamed "The Crocodile." A 2006 New York Times obituary about Lacoste's son, Bernard, provides an apparently authoritative one. In the 1920s, supposedly, Lacoste made a bet with his team captain about whether he would win a certain match. The stakes were a suitcase he had seen in a Boston store; it was made of alligator skin. Following his victory, the American press dubbed him "The Alligator." Later, René Lacoste's friend Robert George embroidered a crocodile onto a blazer that Lacoste wore for his matches.

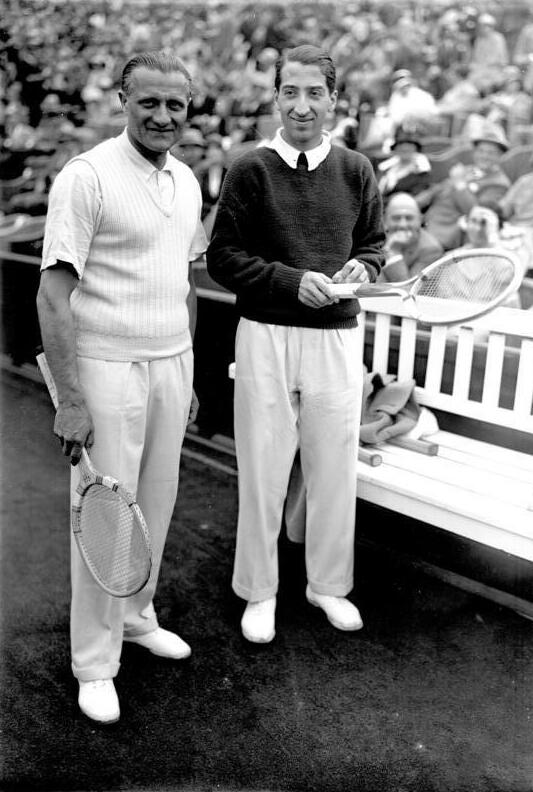
Lacoste (right) with Otto Froitzheim

=== Playing style ===
Lacoste was primarily a baseline player who relied on control, accuracy, and deeply-placed groundstrokes to put pressure on his opponents. In addition he possessed an excellent passing shot and backhand slice. Nicknamed the 'Tennis Machine' for his methodical game and ability to avoid errors, he was known as a devoted and hard-working player, rather than a player with a great amount of natural talent. His style was a complete contrast to that of his fellow Musketeer Henri Cochet. Lacoste was a studious tactician who meticulously analysed his opponents and kept detailed notes on their strengths and weaknesses.

== Business career ==
In 1933, Lacoste founded La Société Chemise Lacoste with André Gillier. The company produced the tennis shirt, also known as a "polo shirt," which Lacoste often wore when he was playing; this had a crocodile (often thought to be an alligator) embroidered on the chest. In 1963, Lacoste's son Bernard took over the management of the company.

In 1961, Lacoste created an innovation in racket technology by unveiling and patenting the first tubular steel tennis racket. At that time, wood rackets were the norm; the new version's strings were attached to the frame by a series of wires, which wrapped around the racket head. The steel-tube racket was stiffer, and imparted a greater force to the ball during a stroke. It was marketed in Europe under the Lacoste brand, but in the United States it was marketed by Wilson Sporting Goods. Pierre Darmon debuted the racket at Wimbledon in 1963, but it achieved critical acclaim and huge popularity as the Wilson T-2000, used by American tennis greats Billie Jean King and Jimmy Connors.

== Personal life ==
Rene Lacoste was born to Jeanne-Marie Magdeleine Larrieu-Let and Jean-Jules Lacoste. His maternal family is from Monein, in southwest France, the genealogy dating back to the 1700s.

On 30 June 1930, he married golfing champion Simone de la Chaume. They had four children together. Their daughter, Catherine Lacoste, is a retired champion golfer, as well as former and now honorary president of the Golf Club Chantaco founded by her mother, located a few kilometres from Saint-Jean-de-Luz, France.

== Grand Slam finals ==
=== Singles: 10 (7 titles, 3 runner-ups) ===
Result	Year	Championship	Surface	Opponent	Score
Loss	1924	Wimbledon	Grass	(France) Jean Borotra	1–6, 6–3, 1–6, 6–3, 4–6
Win	1925	French Championships	Clay	(France) Jean Borotra	7–5, 6–1, 6–4
Win	1925	Wimbledon	Grass	(France) Jean Borotra	6–3, 6–3, 4–6, 8–6
Loss	1926	French Championships	Clay	(France) Henri Cochet	2–6, 4–6, 3–6
Win	1926	U.S. National Championships	Grass	(France) Jean Borotra	6–4, 6–0, 6–4
Win	1927	French Championships	Clay	(United States) Bill Tilden	6–4, 4–6, 5–7, 6–3, 11–9
Win	1927	U.S. National Championships	Grass	(United States) Bill Tilden	11–9, 6–3, 11–9
Loss	1928	French Championships	Clay	(France) Henri Cochet	7–5, 3–6, 1–6, 3–6
Win	1928	Wimbledon	Grass	(France) Henri Cochet	6–1, 4–6, 6–4, 6–2
Win	1929	French Championships	Clay	(France) Jean Borotra	6–3, 2–6, 6–0, 2–6, 8–6

=== Doubles: 4 (3 titles, 1 runner-ups) ===
Result	Year	Championship	Surface	Partner	Opponents	Score
Win	1925	French Championships	Clay	(France) Jean Borotra	(France) Jacques Brugnon (France) Henri Cochet	7–5, 4–6, 6–3, 2–6, 6–3
Win	1925	Wimbledon	Grass	(France) Jean Borotra	(United States) John Hennessey (United States) Raymond Casey	6–4, 11–9, 4–6, 1–6, 6–3
Loss	1927	French Championships	Clay	(France) Jean Borotra	(France) Jacques Brugnon (France) Henri Cochet	6–2, 2–6, 0–6, 6–1, 4–6
Win	1929	French Championships	Clay	(France) Jean Borotra	(France) Jacques Brugnon (France) Henri Cochet	6–3, 3–6, 6–3, 3–6, 8–6

=== Mixed doubles: 2 (2 runner-ups) ===
Result	Year	Championship	Surface	Partner	Opponents	Score
Loss	1926	U.S. National Championships	Grass	(United States) Hazel Hotchkiss Wightman	(United States) Elizabeth Ryan (France) Jean Borotra	4–6, 5–7
Loss	1927	U.S. National Championships	Grass	(United States) Hazel Hotchkiss Wightman	(United Kingdom) Eileen Bennett (France) Henri Cochet	2–6, 6–0, 3–6

== Performance timeline ==
Key
W	F	SF	QF	#R	RR	Q#	DNQ	A	NH

(W) winner; (F) finalist; (SF) semifinalist; (QF) quarterfinalist; (#R) rounds 4, 3, 2, 1; (RR) round-robin stage; (Q#) qualification round; (DNQ) did not qualify; (A) absent; (NH) not held; (SR) strike rate (events won / competed); (W–L) win–loss record.

(OF) only for French club members

Tournament	1922	1923	1924	1925	1926	1927	1928	1929	1930	1931	1932	SR	W–L	Win %
Grand Slam tournaments
Australian Championships	A	A	A	A	A	A	A	A	A	A	A	0 / 0	0–0	–
French Championships	OF			W	F	W	F	W	A	A	4R	3 / 6	29–3	90.6
Wimbledon	1R	4R	F	W	A	SF	W	A	A	A	A	2 / 6	28–4	87.5
U.S. Championships	A	2R	QF	QF	W	W	A	A	A	A	A	2 / 5	19–3	86.4
Win–loss	0–1	4–2	9–2	16–1	10–1	17–1	12–1	5–0			3–1	7 / 17	76–10	88.4
National representation
Olympics	NH		QF	Not held								0 / 1	3–1	75.0

== All-time record ==
Tournament	Since	Record accomplished	Players matched
Grand Slam	1877	Youngest player to win 2 titles at 3 Grand Slams	Stands alone

== See also ==
- List of male tennis players
- Tennis records of All Time – Men's singles
- List of Grand Slam men's singles champions
