= Ray Casey =

American tennis player and coach

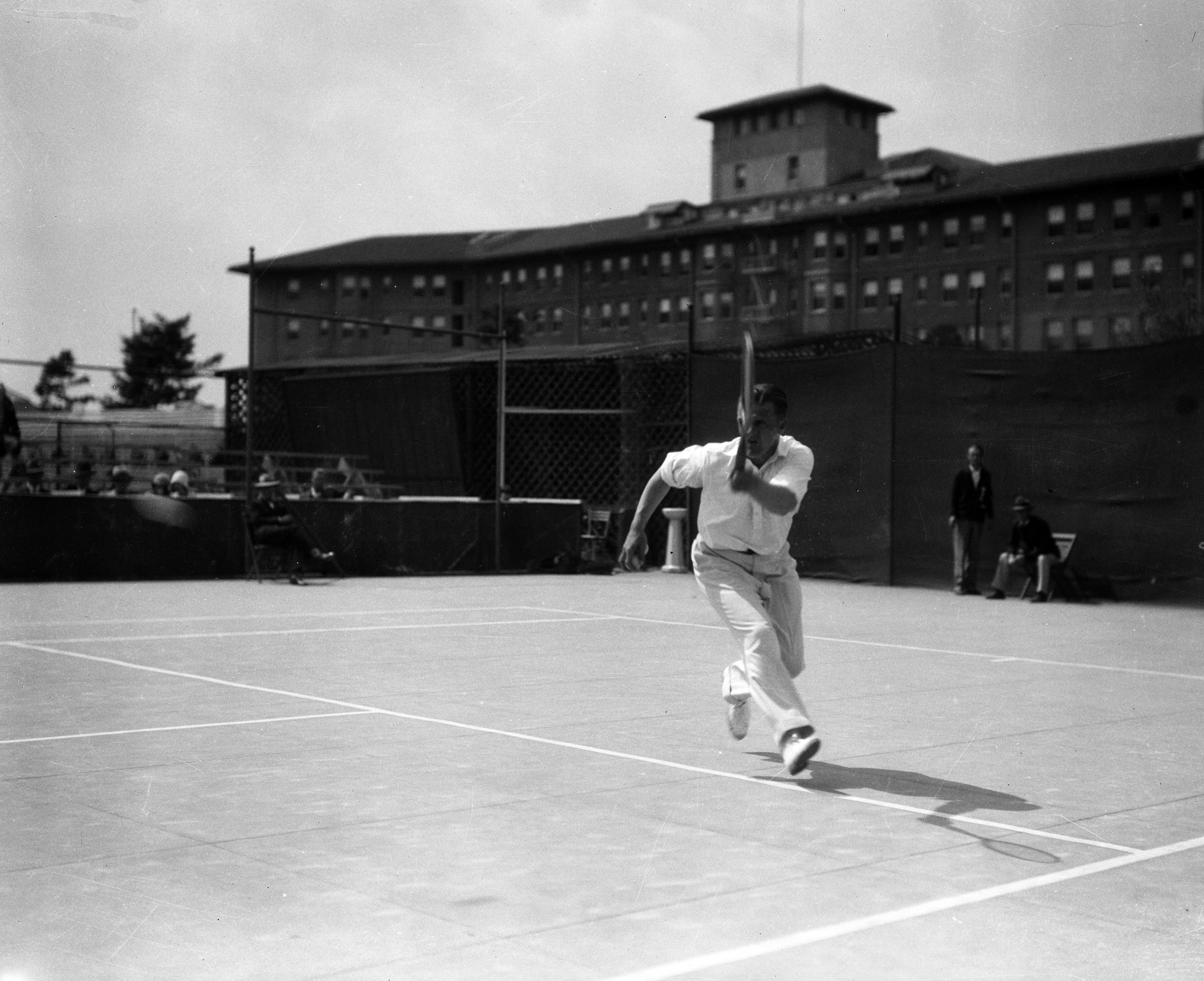
- Casey in 1924
- Born: 1900; San Francisco, California, U.S.
- Died: 1986 (aged 85–86); Palo Alto, California, U.S.
- Plays: Left-hand
- College: University of California, Berkeley

Singles
- Career titles: 6

Grand Slam singles results
- Wimbledon: 4R (1925)

Doubles

Grand Slam doubles results
- Wimbledon: F (1925)

Coaching career (1950s-1960s)

Raymond J. Casey (1900 in San Francisco, California – 1986 in Palo Alto, California) was a top-ranked tennis player and coach.

== Career ==
Casey was a 12-letter athlete at the University of California, Berkeley. A left-hander, he was considered to have one of the fastest serves in the world.

Casey won the Ojai championships in 1923 by beating Howard Godshall in the final. He won the Oregon state title in 1924 by beating Phil Neer in the final. Casey won the Washington state title in 1924 by beating Leon De Turenne in the final. Casey won the British Columbia title in 1924 by beating A. S. Milne in the final.

Casey won the Pacific Northwest title in 1924 by beating Neil Brown in the final, which was his fourth title in a month. Later that year, he won the California state championships, beating Roland Roberts in the final. In 1925, Casey and John Hennessey reached the finals of the Wimbledon doubles. They lost in five sets to Jean Borotra and René Lacoste. Casey lost in the last 16 of the singles to Lacoste.

Casey lost in the final of the Southern Californian tennis championships in 1927 to Jerry Stratford.

== Grand Slam finals ==
=== Doubles (1 runner-up) ===
Result	Year	Championship	Surface	Partner	Opponents	Score
Loss	1925	Wimbledon	Grass	(United States) John F. Hennessey	(France) Jean Borotra (France) René Lacoste	4–6, 9–11, 6–4, 6–1, 3–6

== See also ==
- List of male tennis players
