= Henley Hard Court Tennis Tournament =

Defunct tennis tournament
- Founded: 1920; 105 years ago
- Abolished: 1966; 59 years ago
- Location: Henley-on-Thames, Oxfordshire, England
- Venue: Phyllis Court Club
- Surface: Clay

The Henley Hard Court Tennis Tournament also known as the Henley Open Hard Court Tennis Tournament or the Henley Hard Courts or the Phyllis Court Open Tournament was a combined men's and women's clay court tennis tournament established in 1920. The tournament which featured two hard court meetings, one played in the spring and the other in the autumn was organised by the Phyllis Court Club and held at their premises at Henley-on-Thames, Oxfordshire, England. The tournament ran until at least 1966.

== History ==
The Henley Hard Court Tennis Tournament also known as the Phyllis Court Open Tournament was a clay court tennis event organised by the Phyllis Court Club at Henley-on-Thames, Oxfordshire, England. The tournament feature two annual meetings, the Henley Hard Court Spring Open Lawn Tennis Tournament, and the Henley Hard Court Autumn Open Lawn Tennis Tournament that were staged from 1920 through until 1966.

Former winners of the men's singles title at the Henley hard courts spring meeting include; Harry Lewis-Barclay, Brian Norton, Franjo Kukuljević and Lew Gerrard. Previous winners of the men's singles title at the Henley hard courts autumn meeting include; Major Ritchie, Henry Mayes, Teddy Tinling, Choy Wai-Chuen, Andre Najar, Ignacy Tłoczyński and Trevor Fancutt. Previous winners of the women's singles title at the spring meeting has included; Doris Covell Craddock, Kitty Mckane, Ermyntrude Harvey, Madge Slaney and Shirley Bloomer. Former winners of autumn meeting included; Edith Clarke, Joan Fry, Georgie Woodgate, Angela Buxton and Nell Truman.

== Venue ==
The Phyllis Court Club was founded in 1906. The club today has four all weather savannah artificial grass courts, with floodlit lighting for evening play.
