= 1927 U.S. National Championships – Men's singles =

Men's singles
- 1927 U.S. National Championships

Final
- Champion: (France) René Lacoste
- Runner-up: (United States) Bill Tilden
- Score: 11–9, 6–3, 11–9

Details
- Draw: 64
- Seeds: 16

Events
Singles	men	women		boys	girls
Doubles	men	women	mixed	boys	girls
- U.S. National Championships

Defending champion René Lacoste defeated Bill Tilden in the final, 11–9, 6–3, 11–9 to win the men's singles tennis title at the 1927 U.S. National Championships. It was Lacoste's second U.S. Championships singles title and fifth major singles title overall.

== Seeds ==
The tournament used two lists of eight players for seeding the men's singles event; one list of U.S. players and one for foreign players. René Lacoste is the champion; others show in brackets the round in which they were eliminated.

1. (United States) Bill Tilden (finalist)
2. (United States) Bill Johnston (semifinals)
3. (Spain) Manuel Alonso (quarterfinals)
4. (United States) Frank Hunter (semifinals)
5. (United States) George Lott (first round)
6. (United States) Richard Norris Williams (first round)
7. (United States) Lewis White (third round)
8. (United States) John Doeg (first round)
1. (France) René Lacoste (champion)
2. (France) Henri Cochet (third round)
3. (France) Jean Borotra (quarterfinals)
4. (France) Jacques Brugnon (quarterfinals)
5. (Belgium) Jean Washer (third round)
6. (Canada) Jack Wright (third round)
7. (Japan) Yoshiro Ohta (second round)
8. (Japan) Ryuki Miki (first round)

== Draw ==
=== Final eight ===
Quarterfinals
(United States) Bill Tilden	6	3	10	6
(France) Jean Borotra	1	6	8	1
(United States) Frank Hunter	4	5	6	6	6
(United States) John Hennessey	6	7	0	3	4
(United States) Bill Johnston	3	6	6	6
(France) Jacques Brugnon	6	2	4	4
(Spain) Manuel Alonso	2	6	4	1
(France) René Lacoste	6	2	6	6

Semifinals
(United States) Bill Tilden	14	6	4	9
(United States) Frank Hunter	12	1	6	7
(United States) Bill Johnston	2	6	4	1
(France) René Lacoste	6	2	6	6

Final
(United States) Bill Tilden	9	3	9
(France) René Lacoste	11	6	11

=== Earlier rounds ===
==== Section 1 ====
First round
1	(United States) Tilden	6	10	7
(United States) Mercur	3	8	5
(United States) Hyde	w/	o
(United States) Bell
(United States) Griffin	3	8	6	6
(United States) Hubbell	6	6	4	4
(United States) Griffin	6	5	2	6	3
(7)	(Japan) Ohta	2	7	6	3	6
8	(United States) Doeg	8	3	6	2
(United States) Appel	10	6	3	6
(United States) Lang	6	4	4	6	6
(United States) Anderson	1	6	6	0	3
(United States) Gilpin	5	3	6
(United States) Thalheimer	7	6	3	rtd.
(Japan) Toba	6	6	2	3	0
(3)	(France) Borotra	3	2	6	6	6

Second round
1	(United States) Tilden	6	6	6
(United States) Bell	2	2	2
(United States) Griffin	6	6	6
(7)	(Japan) Ohta	0	2	2
(United States) Appel	6	5	0
(United States) Lang	8	7	6
(United States) Gilpin	4	6	8	5
(3)	(France) Borotra	6	8	6	7

Third round
1	(United States) Tilden	4	6	11	6
(United States) Griffin	6	1	9	0
(United States) Lang	6	6	3	1	3
(3)	(France) Borotra	2	4	6	6	6

Quarterfinals
1	(United States) Tilden	6	3	10	6
(3)	(France) Borotra	1	6	8	1

==== Section 2 ====
First round
4	(United States) Hunter	6	8	3	6
(United States) Seligson	1	6	6	2
(United States) Chandler
(United States) Allison	w/	o
(United Kingdom) Evans	0	1	1
(United States) Coggeshall	6	6	6
(United States) Coen	w/	o
(5)	(Belgium) Washer
6	(United States) Williams	w/	o
(United States) Herndon
(United States) Baur	3	4	2
(United States) Hennessey	6	6	6
(United States) Feibleman	6	6	6
(Japan) Onda	4	3	4
(United States) Kynaston	3	5	3
(2)	(France) Cochet	6	7	6

Second round
4	(United States) Hunter	6	9	6
(United States) Chandler	2	7	4
(United States) Coggeshall	4	0	2
(5)	(Belgium) Washer	6	6	6
(United States) Herndon	4	1	2
(United States) Hennessey	6	6	6
(United States) Feibleman	4	6	7	0
(2)	(France) Cochet	6	8	5	6

Third round
4	(United States) Hunter	7	6	6
(5)	(Belgium) Washer	5	3	3
(United States) Hennessey	6	6	4	3	6
(2)	(France) Cochet	4	4	6	6	1

Quarterfinals
4	(United States) Hunter	4	5	6	6	6
(United States) Hennessey	6	7	0	3	4

==== Section 3 ====
First round
2	(United States) Johnston	7	6	7
(United States) King	5	3	5
(United States) Olhausen	6	7	4
(United States) Marsh	8	9	6
(United States) Williams	w/	o
(Canada) Leslie
(United States) Mooney	0	4	2
(6)	(Canada) Wright	6	6	6
7	(United States) White	7	3	1	0
(United States) Jones	5	6	6	6
(United States) Fischer	6	3	6	6	6
(United States) Shields	3	6	2	8	3
(United States) Strachan	4	6	6	6
(United States) Sidney Wood	6	3	4	2
(United States) Mangin	4	5	3
(4)	(France) Brugnon	6	7	6

Second round
2	(United States) Johnston	6	6	7
(United States) Marsh	1	4	5
(Canada) Leslie	5	1	9	1
(6)	(Canada) Wright	7	6	7	6
(United States) Jones	6	6	6
(United States) Fischer	1	1	2
(United States) Strachan	0	1	2
(4)	(France) Brugnon	6	6	6

Third round
2	(United States) Johnston	6	6	6
(6)	(Canada) Wright	4	4	4
(United States) Jones	7	6	6	1	1
(4)	(France) Brugnon	9	4	3	6	6

Quarterfinals
2	(United States) Johnston	3	6	6	6
(4)	(France) Brugnon	6	2	4	4

==== Section 4 ====
First round
3	(Spain) Alonso	5	8	6	6
(United States) Hall	7	6	4	3
(United States) Washburn	5	6	5	6	6
(United States) Weiner	7	1	7	0	0
(United States) Van Ryn	6	6	3	6
(United States) Johnson	4	4	6	4
(United States) Bowman	6	6	6
(8)	(Japan) Miki	4	1	2
5	(United States) Lott	w/	o
(United States) Behr
(Japan) Harada	6	6	6
(United States) Orser	1	3	1
(Canada) Nunns	4	6	3	6	6
(United States) Sullivan	6	4	6	0	3
(United States) Owens	4	4	2
(1)	(France) Lacoste	6	6	6

Second round
3	(Spain) Alonso	6	4	6	6
(United States) Washburn	2	6	3	2
(United States) Van Ryn	4	6	7	8
(United States) Bowman	6	2	5	6
(United States) Behr	3	3	2
(Japan) Harada	6	6	6
(Canada) Nunns	0	2	4
(1)	(France) Lacoste	6	6	6

Third round
3	(Spain) Alonso	5	3	6	6	6
(United States) Van Ryn	7	6	1	4	0
(Japan) Harada	3	4	3
(1)	(France) Lacoste	6	6	6

Quarterfinals
3	(Spain) Alonso	8	4	1	2
(1)	(France) Lacoste	6	6	6	6

Preceded by 1927 Wimbledon Championships	Grand Slams; Men's Singles	Succeeded by 1928 Australian Championships
