= 1927 U.S. National Championships – Women's doubles =

Women's doubles
- 1927 U.S. National Championships

Final
- Champion: (United Kingdom) Ermyntrude Harvey (United Kingdom) Kitty McKane Godfree
- Runner-up: (United Kingdom) Joan Fry (United Kingdom) Betty Nuthall
- Score: 6–1, 4–6, 6–4

Details
- Draw: 32

Events
Singles	men	women
Doubles	men	women
← 1926 ·	U.S. National Championships	· 1928 →

Elizabeth Ryan and Eleanor Goss were the defending women's doubles champions at the U.S. National Championships, but did not compete together. Ermyntrude Harvey and Kitty McKane Godfree defeated Joan Fry and Betty Nuthall in the final, 6–1, 4–6, 6–4.

== Draw ==
=== Finals ===
Semifinals
(United Kingdom) Ermyntrude Harvey (United Kingdom) Kitty McKane Godfree	6	7
(United States) Charlotte Hosmer Chapin (United States) Eleanor Goss	4	5
(United Kingdom) Joan Fry (United Kingdom) Betty Nuthall	6	6
(United Kingdom) Dorothy Hill (United Kingdom) Gwen Sterry	3	3

Final
(United Kingdom) Ermyntrude Harvey (United Kingdom) Kitty McKane Godfree	6	4	6
(United Kingdom) Joan Fry (United Kingdom) Betty Nuthall	1	6	4
