= Robert George (ice hockey) =

French ice hockey player

Personal information
- Nationality: French
- Born: 10 June 1893; Paris, France
- Died: 23 October 1985 (aged 92); Paris, France

Sport
- Sport: Ice hockey

Robert George (French pronunciation: [ʒɔʁʒ ʁɔbɛʁ]; 10 June 1893 – 23 October 1985) was a French ice hockey player. He competed in the men's tournament at the 1928 Winter Olympics. He was a friend of René Lacoste, and designed the crocodile logo on the Lacoste tennis shirt.
