= 1927 U.S. National Championships – Women's singles =

Women's singles
- 1927 U.S. National Championships

Final
- Champion: (United States) Helen Wills
- Runner-up: (United Kingdom) Betty Nuthall
- Score: 6–1, 6–4

Details
- Draw: 64

Events
Singles	men	women
Doubles	men	women
← 1926 ·	U.S. National Championships	· 1928 →

First-seeded Helen Wills defeated Betty Nuthall 6–1, 6–4 in the final to win the women's singles tennis title at the 1927 U.S. National Championships. The event was held at the West Side Tennis Club, Forest Hills, New York City. It was Wills's fourth U.S. National singles title. She won the title without losing a set and lost only 18 games in six matches.

== Draw ==
=== Final eight ===
Quarterfinals
(United States) Helen Wills	6	6
(Netherlands) Kea Bouman	1	2
(United States) Helen Jacobs	6	8	6
(United States) Edna Hauselt Roeser	8	6	2
(United States) Molla Mallory	3	6	4
(United States) Charlotte Hosmer Chapin	6	1	6
(United States) Eleanor Goss	6	5	2
(United Kingdom) Betty Nuthall	4	7	6

Semifinals
1	(United States) Helen Wills	6	6
4	(United States) Helen Jacobs	0	2
(United States) Charlotte Hosmer Chapin	1	6	3
(United Kingdom) Betty Nuthall	6	4	6

Finals
1	(United States) Helen Wills	6	6
3	(United Kingdom) Betty Nuthall	1	4

Preceded by 1927 Wimbledon Championships – Women's singles	Grand Slam women's singles	Succeeded by 1928 Australian Championships – Women's singles
