= 1927 U.S. National Championships (tennis) =

- Date: September 12–17 (M); August 22–30 (W); August 30-September 5 (Men's Doubles); August 30-September 5 (Mixed Doubles)
- Edition: 47th
- Category: Grand Slam (ITF)
- Surface: Grass
- Location: Forest Hills, Queens, New York City; Chestnut Hill, Massachusetts
- Venue: West Side Tennis Club; Longwood Cricket Club

Champions

Men's singles
- (France) René Lacoste

Women's singles
- (United States) Helen Wills

Men's doubles
- (United States) Bill Tilden / (United States) Frank Hunter

Women's doubles
- (United Kingdom) Kitty McKane Godfree / (United Kingdom) Ermyntrude Harvey

Mixed doubles
- (United Kingdom) Eileen Bennett / (France) Henri Cochet
- U.S. National Championships

The 1927 U.S. National Championships (now known as the US Open) was a tennis tournament that took place on the outdoor grass courts at the West Side Tennis Club, Forest Hills in New York City, New York and the Longwood Cricket Club in Chestnut Hill, Massachusetts. The women's tournament (singles and doubles) was held from August 22 until August 30 at Forest Hills, the men's and mixed doubles from August 30 until September 5 at Chestnut Hill, and men's singles from September 12 until September 17 at Forest Hills. It was the 47th staging of the U.S. National Championships and the fourth Grand Slam tennis event of the year. This edition saw the introduction of seedings in the draw which were meant to prevent the best players from meeting each other in the early rounds of the tournament.

== Champions ==
=== Men's singles ===
(France) René Lacoste defeated (United States) Bill Tilden 11–9, 6–3, 11–9

=== Women's singles ===
(United States) Helen Wills defeated (United Kingdom) Betty Nuthall 6–1, 6–4

=== Men's doubles ===
(United States) Bill Tilden / (United States) Frank Hunter defeated (United States) Bill Johnston / (United States) R. Norris Williams 10–8, 6–3, 6–3

=== Women's doubles ===
(United Kingdom) Kitty McKane Godfree / (United Kingdom) Ermyntrude Harvey defeated (United Kingdom) Betty Nuthall / (United Kingdom) Joan Fry 6–1, 4–6, 6–4

=== Mixed doubles ===
(United Kingdom) Eileen Bennett / (France) Henri Cochet defeated (United States) Hazel Hotchkiss Wightman / (France) René Lacoste 6–2, 0–6, 6–3

Preceded by 1927 Wimbledon Championships	Grand Slams	Succeeded by 1928 Australian Championships
