= Yoshiro Ota =

Japanese tennis player (1900–1993)

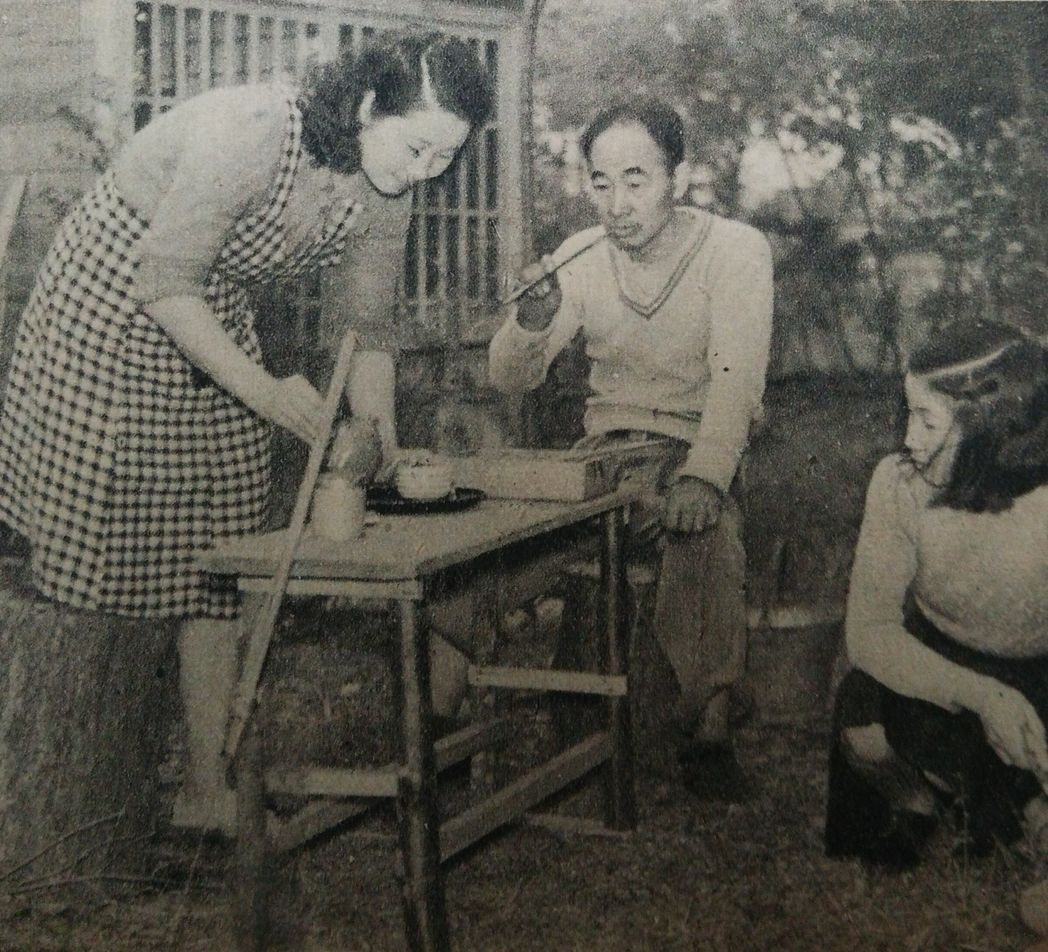
- Native name: 太田芳郎
- Country (sports): Japan
- Born: 11 January 1900; Kariwa, Niigata, Japan
- Died: 29 March 1993 (aged 93)

Singles

Grand Slam singles results
- French Open: 4R (1930)
- Wimbledon: 3R (1928)
- US Open: 2R (1927)

Yoshiro Ota (11 January 1900 – 29 March 1993) was a Japanese tennis player.

Ota was born and raised in Niigata Prefecture. He won the All-Japan singles championship in 1926, then from 1927 to 1930 represented Japan in the Davis Cup, amassing a 12–8 record in singles play. His Davis Cup career included participation in the 1927 Interzone final against France and an upset win over American No. 2 John Van Ryn in 1929.

While based in England, Ota won numerous local tournaments, which included beating Fred Perry in the final of the Surrey Championships. He also competed in mainland Europe and made the fourth round of the 1930 French Championships, where he claimed the first two sets in a five set loss to Jean Borotra.

== See also ==
- List of Japan Davis Cup team representatives
