= 1925 French Championships – Men's singles =

Men's singles
- 1925 French Championships

Final
- Champion: (France) René Lacoste
- Runner-up: (France) Jean Borotra
- Score: 7–5, 6–1, 6–4

Details
- Draw: 61
- Seeds: 16

Events
Singles	men	women		boys	girls
Doubles	men	women	mixed	boys	girls
- French Championships

Fifth-seeded René Lacoste defeated Jean Borotra in the final, 7–5, 6–1, 6–4 to win the men's singles tennis title at the 1925 French Championships. The draw consisted of 61 players of whom 16 were seeded. This was the first time the French Championships was staged as a Grand Slam event.

== Seeds ==
1. (South Africa) Pat Spence (third round)
2. (Belgium) Jean Washer (semifinals)
3. (France) Jean Borotra (final)
4. (Colombia) Fred Restrepo (third round)
5. (France) René Lacoste (champion)
6. (Switzerland) Charles Aeschlimann (second round)
7. (Romania) Nicolae Mișu (third round)
8. (India) Sydney Jacob (semifinals)
9. (France) Jacques Brugnon (third round)
10. (France) Henri Cochet (quarterfinals)
11. (France) Paul Féret (quarterfinals)
12. (France) Antoine Gentien (second round)
13. (Spain) Eduardo Flaquer (quarterfinals)
14. (France) Léonce Aslangul (third round)
15. (Spain) Raimundo Morales (third round)
16. (France) André Gobert (quarterfinals)

Click on the seed number of a player to go to their draw section.

== Draw ==
Key

- Q = Qualifier
- WC = Wild card
- LL = Lucky loser
- Alt = Alternate
- ITF = ITF entry
- PR = Protected ranking
- SR = Special ranking
- SE = Special exempt
- JE = Junior exempt
- JR = Junior Accelerator Programme entrant
- CO = College Accelerator Programme entrant
- NG = Next Gen Accelerator Program entrant
- w/o = Walkover
- r = Retired
- d = Defaulted

=== Finals ===
Quarterfinals
2	(Belgium) Jean Washer	8	8	6
10	(France) Henri Cochet	6	6	4
3	(France) Jean Borotra	1	6	6	6
11	(France) Paul Féret	6	3	3	2
5	(France) René Lacoste	6	7	6
13	(Spain) Eduardo Flaquer	4	5	2
8	(India) Sydney Jacob	2	2	6	7	0
16	(France) André Gobert	6	6	4	5	0^{r}

Semifinals
2	(Belgium) Jean Washer	2	1	3
3	(France) Jean Borotra	6	6	6
5	(France) René Lacoste	6	6	4	7
8	(India) Sydney Jacob	2	1	6	5

Final
3	(France) Jean Borotra	5	1	4
5	(France) René Lacoste	7	6	6

=== Top half ===
==== Section 1 ====
First round
(France) Jean Augustin	1	2	2
(United Kingdom) Cyril Eames	6	6	6
(France) René Meunier
(France) Jean Couiteas
(France) Roger George	1	1	4
15	(Spain) Raimundo Morales	6	6	6
(France) A Persin	4	6	6	4	5
7	(Romania) Nicolae Mișu	6	4	4	6	7
(France) Roger Danet
(United Kingdom) Percy Portlock
10	(France) Henri Cochet	6	6	6
(France) Raymond Rodel	4	4	0
(France) Georges Gouttenoire	4	6	4	2
(India) Jagat Mohan Lal	6	4	6	6

Second round
2	(Belgium) Jean Washer	6	6	7
(United Kingdom) C Eames	4	3	5
(France) R Meunier	2	3	0
15	(Spain) R Morales	6	6	6
7	(Romania) N Mișu	6	6	6
(France) R Danet	4	3	4
10	(France) H Cochet	4	6	6	6
(India) JM Lal	6	3	4	2

Third round
2	(Belgium) J Washer	7	6	6
15	(Spain) R Morales	5	3	2
7	(Romania) N Mișu	3	0	2
10	(France) H Cochet	6	6	6

Quarterfinals
10	(France) H Cochet	6	6	4
2	(Belgium) J Washer	8	8	6

==== Section 2 ====
First round
3	(France) Jean Borotra	6	10	4	6
(France) Alain Bernard	4	8	6	3
(France) René de Buzelet	6	1	1	3
(India) Hassan Ali Fyzee	4	6	6	6
(France) Pierre Passemard	3	3	5
14	(France) Léonce Aslangul	6	6	7
(France) Pierre Hirsch	4	6	6	6
(Portugal) Rodrigo de Castro Pereira	6	4	1	4
(France) R le Blant
6	(Switzerland) Charles Aeschlimann
(France) Jacques Quiry	1	5	6	2
11	(France) Paul Féret	6	7	2	6
(France) Jacques Arago
(Greece) Augustos Zerlendis
(France) Max Decugis
(Spain) Luis de Olivares

Second round
3	(France) J Borotra	6	6	1	6
(India) HA Fyzee	4	2	6	3
14	(France) L Aslangul	6	6	6
(France) P Hirsch	3	4	3
6	(Switzerland) C Aeschlimann	6	5	0	3
11	(France) P Féret	2	7	6	6
(France) J Arago	1	2	6	3
(Spain) L de Olivares	6	6	4	6

Third round
3	(France) J Borotra	6	4	6	4	6
14	(France) L Aslangul	3	6	4	6	0
11	(France) P Féret	6	6	6
(Spain) L de Olivares	2	0	0

Quarterfinals
3	(France) J Borotra	1	6	6	6
11	(France) P Féret	6	3	3	2

=== Bottom half ===
==== Section 3 ====
First round
5	(France) René Lacoste	6	6	6
(India) Shashidri Suvarna	0	0	0
(France) Jean de Buzelet	4	10	3	3
(Switzerland) C Vuarin	6	8	6	6
(France) André Chancerel
(India) Athar-Ali Fyzee
12	(France) Antoine Gentien	6	6	6
(Portugal) Antonio Casanovas	2	2	1
(France) Maxime Guillemot	1	2	6	3
13	(Spain) Eduardo Flaquer	6	6	3	6
(France) Pierre Canivet
(Australia) Rodney Heath
(United Kingdom) Y Das de Kapurthala
(France) Jean-Pierre Samazeuilh
(France) Edouard Borotra	7	6	2	4
4	(Colombia) F Restrepo	9	4	6	6

Second round
5	(France) R Lacoste	6	6	6
(Switzerland) C Vuarin	2	0	0
(India) AA Fyzee	5	11	0
12	(France) A Gentien	7	9	0^{r}
13	(Spain) E Flaquer	6	6	6
(France) P Canivet	2	0	4
(United Kingdom) Y Das de Kapurthala	3	1	4
4	(Colombia) F Restrepo	6	6	6

Third round
5	(France) R Lacoste	6	6	9
(India) AA Fyzee	4	1	7
13	(Spain) E Flaquer	6	8	3	7
4	(Colombia) F Restrepo	3	6	6	5

Quarterfinals
5	(France) R Lacoste	6	7	6
13	(Spain) E Flaquer	4	5	2

==== Section 4 ====
First round
8	(India) Sydney Jacob	7	6	6
(France) André Piel	5	0	3
(Greece) Pan Papadopoulos	4	1	3
(France) Adrien Aron	6	6	6
9	(France) Jacques Brugnon
(France) M Fournier
(United Kingdom) Gordon Crole-Rees	2	3	8	6	6
(France) Robert Champin	6	6	6	4	2
(France) Henri Reynaud	1	2	6	3
16	(France) André Gobert	6	6	3	6
(France) Pierre Henri Landry
(Italy) Ugo Chiesa

Second round
8	(India) S Jacob	2	6	6	6
(France) A Aron	6	2	1	1
9	(France) J Brugnon	6	9	6
(United Kingdom) G Crole-Rees	3	7	3
16	(France) A Gobert	5	6	6	6
(France) PH Landry	7	3	2	1
(Poland) Edward Kleinadel	3	2	1
1	(South Africa) Pat Spence	6	6	6

Third round
8	(India) S Jacob	7	3	6	6
9	(France) J Brugnon	5	6	2	3
16	(France) A Gobert	0	9	6	6
1	(South Africa) P Spence	6	7	2	3

Quarterfinals
8	(India) S Jacob	2	2	6	7	0
16	(France) A Gobert	6	6	4	5	0^{r}

Preceded by 1925 Australasian Championships – Men's singles	Grand Slam men's singles	Succeeded by 1925 Wimbledon Championships – Men's singles
