= Harry Lewis-Barclay =

Harry Samuel Lewis Barclay
Personal information
- Full name: Harry Samuel Lewis-Barclay
- Born: 7 November 1892; Beaconsfield, Tasmania, Australia
- Died: 20 April 1956 (aged 63); Barnet, Hertfordshire, England
- Batting: Left-handed
- Bowling: Slow
- Role: Bowler

Domestic team information
- Years: Team
- 1926: Southern Punjab
- 1926: Northern India
- 1928: Army

Career statistics
| Competition | First-class |
|---|---|
| Matches | 4 |
| Runs scored | 32 |
| Batting average | 10.66 |
| 100s/50s | 0/0 |
| Top score | 14* |
| Balls bowled | 583 |
| Wickets | 9 |
| Bowling average | 35.11 |
| 5 wickets in innings | 0 |
| 10 wickets in match | 0 |
| Best bowling | 3/75 |
| Catches/stumpings | 1/– |
- Source: CricketArchive, 13 July 2012

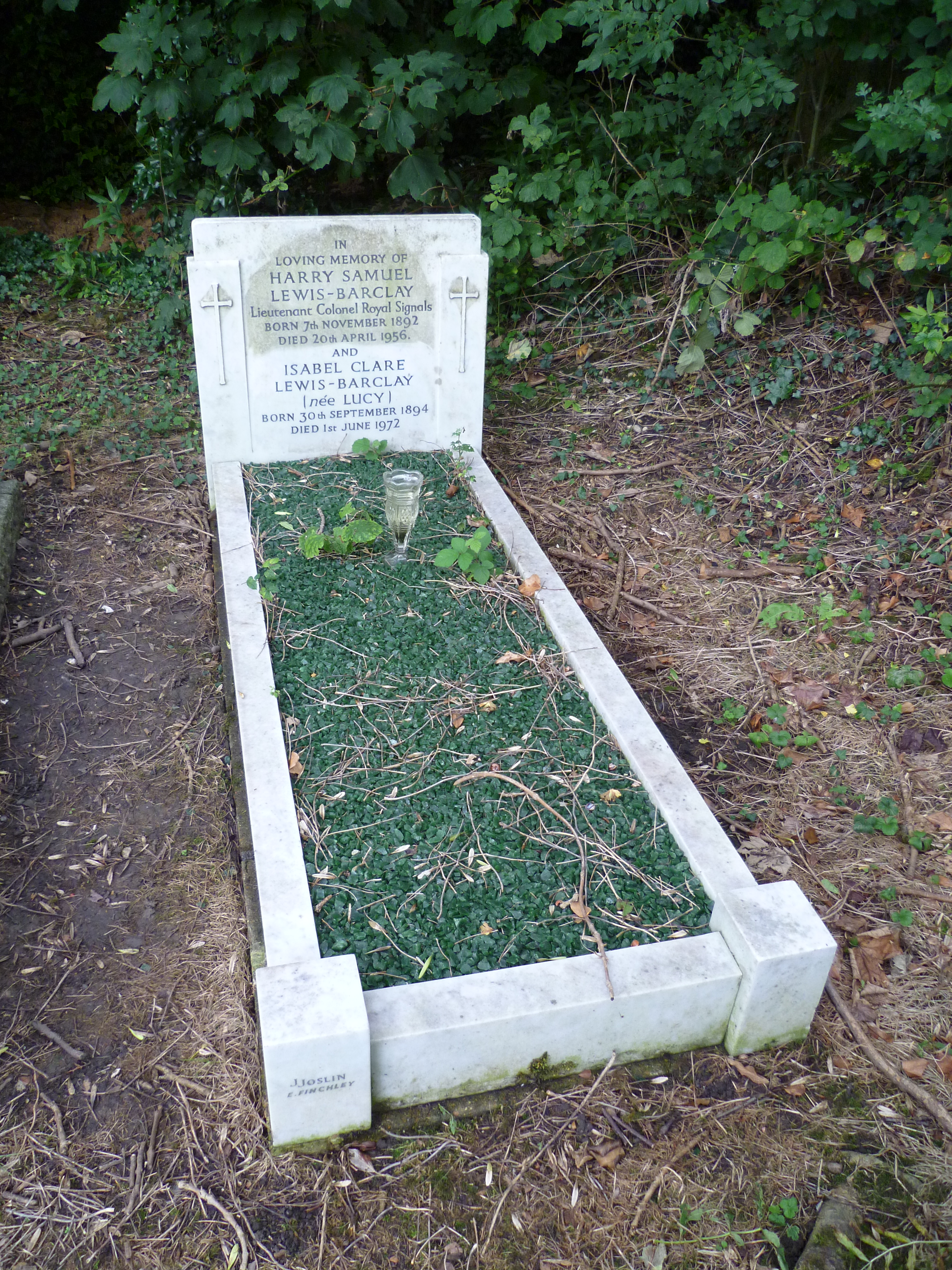
Lewis-Barclay's grave at St Andrew's church, Totteridge.

Lieutenant-Colonel Harry Samuel Lewis Barclay (7 November 1892 – 20 April 1956) was an Australian-born army officer and sportsman who played first-class cricket and was a quarter-finalist at the 1925 Wimbledon Championships.

== Military career ==
Having served as a captain in the 40th Battalion (Australia) in the First World War, he transferred to the Indian Army in 1917 and to the British Army's Royal Corps of Signals in 1927. He retired as a lieutenant-colonel in 1946.

== Cricket ==
On 13 November 1926, Lewis-Barclay made his first-class debut, for Southern Punjab, against the touring Marylebone Cricket Club (MCC) from England. The match was played in Lahore and Lewis-Barclay opened the bowling for Southern Punjab, claiming figures of 3-75, which included the wicket of the MCC captain Arthur Gilligan. After amassing 285 runs in the first innings, the MCC dismissed Southern Punjab for just 89 and enforced the follow-on. Southern Punjab were eight wickets down and still trailing the MCC when Lewis-Barclay came to the crease in the second innings. He made 14 not out and managed to save the match with number 11 Barkat Ali. On 18 November he made another first-class appearance against the MCC in Lahore, this time for Northern India. He had Test player Maurice Tate caught and bowled and again dismissed Gilligan, to finish with figures of 2–68 in the MCC's only innings. His other two first-class matches were played in 1928, for the British Army, against the Royal Air Force cricket team at Kennington Oval and the Royal Navy cricket team at Lord's.

== Tennis ==
Lewis-Barclay played his first tournament in 1914 at the Metropolitan Cricket (MCC ) Autumn Tournament at Melbourne. In 1915 he won his title at the Tasmanian Championships at Hobart. In 1919 he was a finalist at the Baroda tournamanent in India. In 1920 he competed on the French Riviera circuit, where he won the prestigious Cannes Championships at the Hotel Beau Site, Cannes.

In 1922 he won his third title at the Canford tournament at Hampstead, London. The same year he won his fourth a final title at the Henley Hard Court Tennis Tournament (spring meeting) at the Phyllis Court Club, he was also finalist at the North London Championships (Gipsy) at Stamford Hill, London and at the All India Championships. In 1925 he was a losing finalist at the Highbury tournament, and also the Kent Championships at Beckenham.

He also competed at the Wimbledon Championships five times, in 1922, 1925, 1929, 1930 and 1931 being the last tournament he played. He made the third round in 1922 but had his best performance in 1925, when he beat Theodore Mavrogordato, Monty Temple, Percival Davson and Henry Mayes, to make the quarter-finals, where he lost to eventual finalist Jean Borotra

== Death ==
Lewis-Barclay died 20 April 1956. He is buried at St Andrew's church, Totteridge, north London.
