= Louis Meldon =

Irish tennis player and cricketer (1886–1956)

Cricket information
- Batting: Right-handed
- Bowling: Right-arm medium

International information
- National side: Ireland

Career statistics
Competition	First-class
Matches	4
Runs scored	151
Batting average	25.16
100s/50s	0/0
Top score	47
Balls bowled	34
Wickets	1
Bowling average	15.00
5 wickets in innings	0
10 wickets in match	0
Best bowling	1/4
Catches/stumpings	3/–
- Source: CricketArchive, 6 December 2022

Louis Albert Meldon (10 October 1886 – 21 February 1956) was an Irish sportsman, who represented his country in both cricket and tennis.

A right-handed batsman and right-arm medium pace bowler, Meldon played four first-class cricket matches for Ireland, all against Scotland, between 1909 and 1912.

He also appeared in five Davis Cup ties for the Irish team and made the third round of the 1925 Wimbledon Championships.
