= Howard Gaunt =

English cricketer, schoolmaster, and clergyman

Cricket information
- Batting: Right-handed

Career statistics
Competition	First-class
Matches	11
Runs scored	147
Batting average	7.73
100s/50s	0/0
Top score	32
Catches/stumpings	6/–
- Source: Cricinfo, 5 March 2021

Howard Charles Adie Gaunt (13 November 1902 – 1 February 1983) was an English schoolmaster and clergyman, known to his friends as Tom Gaunt.

He also played first-class cricket for Warwickshire in 11 matches between 1919 and 1922.

== Life and career ==
Born at Edgbaston, Birmingham, Gaunt was educated at Tonbridge School where he was in the cricket eleven between 1919 and 1921, and at King's College, Cambridge. He became a schoolmaster and was assistant master at King Edward's School, Birmingham and at Rugby School. In 1937, he was appointed as headmaster of Malvern College and was in charge for 16 years, including the years of the Second World War when the school buildings were requisitioned by the UK government and the school relocated first to Blenheim Palace and then to Harrow School; Gaunt wrote a book about the evacuations.

Gaunt resigned from Malvern in 1953 and went to Winchester College as assistant master and chaplain; he became a deacon in 1954 and a priest the following year. In 1963, he left the school to become full-time sacristan at Winchester Cathedral and was made precentor in 1967; he was made a canon in 1966 and became canon emeritus when he retired in 1974.

== Cricket career ==
Gaunt played three times in the Lord's schools cricket festival for Tonbridge School against Clifton College as an opening batsman and in 1921 he scored 177 in Tonbridge's second innings out of 274 made while he was at the wicket. Wisden Cricketers' Almanack reported that he was "very severe on the long hops with which he was liberally favoured".

While a 16-year-old still at school, Gaunt was picked to play for Warwickshire and scored 5 and 13 not out in the 1919 match against Worcestershire, which was not a County Championship game as Worcestershire did not enter the competition that year. He played in other Warwickshire matches in the school holidays in 1920 and 1921 but was not successful in them. At Cambridge University in 1922, he played in the freshmen's trial match and another trial game, but was not picked for any of the University first-team matches; he did, however, play for Warwickshire against the university team, a ploy often used to try out potential university players, but scores of 0 and 17 did not persuade a strong Cambridge side to give him a further trial. He played in further first-class matches across the summer of 1922 for Warwickshire and his innings of 32 in the match against Somerset was the highest of his first-class career. But after this season he played no more first-class cricket. Unsuccessful in Cambridge University cricket, he nevertheless represented the university in both field hockey and tennis.

He died at Winchester, Hampshire.
