= France Davis Cup team =

Davis Cup team representing France

France
- Captain: Gaël Monfils
- Nations Ranking: 10 ▼4 (21 September 2026)
- Colors: Blue & White
- First year: 1904
- Years played: 105
- Ties played (W–L): 279 (180–99)
- Years in World Group: 43 (69–42)
- Davis Cup titles: 10 (1927, 1928, 1929, 1930, 1931, 1932, 1991, 1996, 2001, 2017)
- Runners-up: 9 (1925, 1926, 1933, 1982, 1999, 2002, 2010, 2014, 2018)
- Most total wins: Pierre Darmon (47–21)
- Most singles wins: Pierre Darmon (44–17)
- Most doubles wins: Jacques Brugnon (22–9)
- Best doubles team: Henri Leconte & Guy Forget (11–0)
- Most ties played: Guillaume Couillard (37)
- Most years played: Jean Borotra (17)

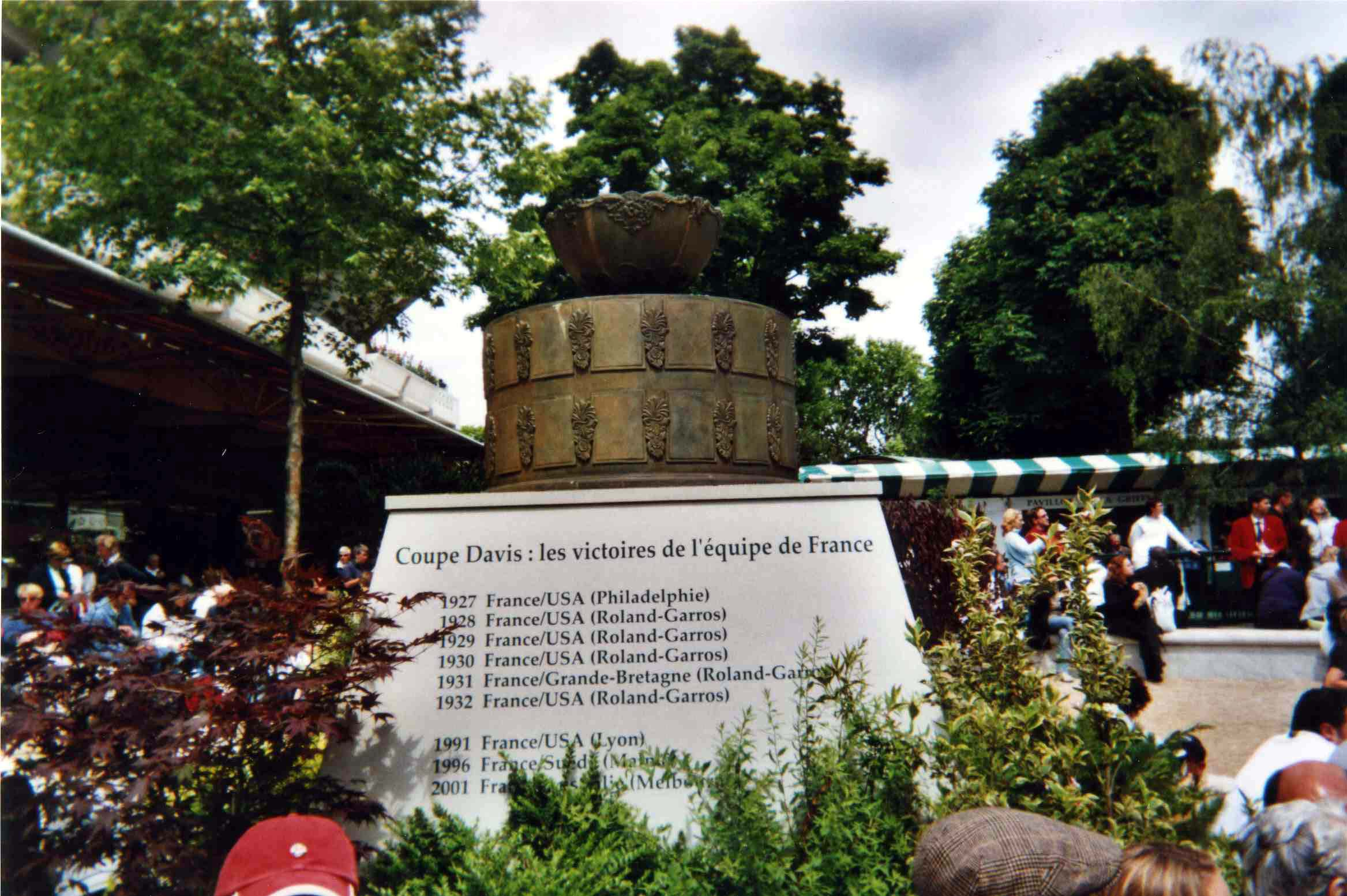
Monument to French Davis Cup successes at Stade Roland Garros.

The France men's national tennis team (French: Équipe de France de Coupe Davis) represents France in Davis Cup tennis competition, and is governed by the Fédération Française de Tennis. France competed in their first Davis Cup in 1904. France is the third most successful nation, with ten wins. Their most recent title came in 2017.

== History ==
France first competed in the Davis Cup in 1904. At the time, the competition was known as the International Lawn Tennis Challenge and was originally contested by United States and Great Britain. Along with Belgium, France was the first nation to be invited into an expanded tournament in its fourth edition.

France has had a rich history with tennis and the Davis Cup. It has won the tournament on 10 occasions. Its first Davis Cup win was in 1927 and its most recent title was in 2017.

=== Media coverage ===
France's Davis Cup matches are currently televised by France Télévisions.

== Results and fixtures ==
The following are lists of match results and scheduled matches for the previous year and upcoming season.

Win Loss Fixture

=== 2025 ===
Qualifiers
First round

France
4
Palais des Sports, Orléans, France
1–2 February 2025
Hard (indoors)

Brazil
0

			1	2	3
1	(France) (Brazil)	Ugo Humbert; João Fonseca	7; 5	6; 3
2	(France) (Brazil)	Arthur Fils; Thiago Seyboth Wild	6; 1	6; 4
3	(France) (Brazil)	Benjamin Bonzi / Pierre-Hugues Herbert; Rafael Matos / Marcelo Melo	4; 6	6; 3	6; 4
4	(France) (Brazil)	Giovanni Mpetshi Perricard; Matheus Pucinelli de Almeida	6; 4	6; 4
5	(France) (Brazil)	Arthur Fils; João Fonseca				not played

Qualifiers
Second round

Croatia
1
Gradski vrt Hall, Osijek, Croatia
12–13 September 2025
Clay (indoors)

France
3

			1	2	3
1	(Croatia) (France)	Dino Prižmić; Corentin Moutet	4; 6	7; 5	1; 6
2	(Croatia) (France)	Marin Čilić; Arthur Rinderknech	2; 6	4; 6
3	(Croatia) (France)	Nikola Mektić / Mate Pavić; Benjamin Bonzi / Pierre-Hugues Herbert	6; 3	7; 5
4	(Croatia) (France)	Marin Čilić; Corentin Moutet	5; 7	4; 6
5	(Croatia) (France)	Dino Prižmić; Arthur Rinderknech				not played

Quarterfinals

France
0
SuperTennis Arena, Bologna
18 November 2025
Hard (indoors)

Belgium
2

			1	2	3
1	(France) (Belgium)	Corentin Moutet; Raphaël Collignon	6; 2	5; 7	5; 7
2	(France) (Belgium)	Arthur Rinderknech; Zizou Bergs	3; 6	6^{4} 7^{7}
3	(France) (Belgium)	Benjamin Bonzi / Pierre-Hugues Herbert; Sander Gillé / Joran Vliegen				not played

=== 2026 ===
Qualifiers
First round

France
3
Le Chaudron, Le Portel, France
7–8 February 2026
Hard (indoors)

Slovakia
1

			1	2	3
1	(France) (Slovakia)	Alexandre Müller; Alex Molčan	4; 6	4; 6
2	(France) (Slovakia)	Arthur Rinderknech; Norbert Gombos	7^{7} 6^{1}	7^{8} 6^{6}
3	(France) (Slovakia)	Benjamin Bonzi / Pierre-Hugues Herbert; Miloš Karol / Lukáš Klein	6; 2	6; 3
4	(France) (Slovakia)	Arthur Rinderknech; Alex Molčan	7; 5	7^{8} 6^{6}
5	(France) (Slovakia)	Alexandre Müller; Norbert Gombos				not played

Qualifiers
Second round

Canada
3
Centre Vidéotron, Quebec City, Canada
18–19 September
Hard (indoors)

France
1

			1	2	3
1	(Canada) (France)	Liam Draxl; Arthur Rinderknech	6; 2	7; 5
2	(Canada) (France)	Félix Auger-Aliassime; Quentin Halys	7^{7} 6^{5}	4; 6	6; 3
3	(Canada) (France)	Félix Auger-Aliassime / Duncan Chan; Benjamin Bonzi / Pierre-Hugues Herbert	6^{4} 7^{7}	3; 6
4	(Canada) (France)	Félix Auger-Aliassime; Arthur Rinderknech	4; 6	7^{7} 6^{5}	6; 4
5	(Canada) (France)	Liam Draxl; Quentin Halys				not played

== Players ==
=== Current team ===
The following players were selected for the 2026 Davis Cup Qualifiers second round held in Quebec City, Canada.

Team nominations for Qualifiers first round against Canada.
Player	Age	ATP ranking		Debut	Nom	Ties	Win-loss			DC Profile
Player	Age	Singles	Doubles	Debut	Nom	Ties	Singles	Doubles	Total	DC Profile
Arthur Rinderknech	31	32	113	2021	9	11	4–5	3–3	7–8	
Luca Van Assche	22	42	—	2024	2	1	1–0	–	1–0	
Quentin Halys	29	77	105	2024	2	1	1–0	–	1–0	
Benjamin Bonzi	29	131	158	2022	7	8	1–4	2–1	3–5	
Pierre-Hugues Herbert	34	171	66	2016	16	18	0–1	15–3	15–4	
Non-playing captain: Paul-Henri Mathieu

== Captains ==
Captain	Tenure	Total	Honours
Max Decugis	1905	1 year	
Allan Muhr	1912	1 year	
Jean Porée	1919	1 year	
Max Decugis (2)	1920–1921	2 years	
Allan Muhr (2)	1922–1923	2 years	
Max Decugis (3)	1924–1925	2 years	1 final
Pierre Gillou	1926–1930	5 years	4 Davis Cup wins, 1 final
René Lacoste	1931–1933	3 years	2 Davis Cup wins, 1 final
Jacques Brugnon	1934–1939	6 years	
Christian Boussus	1946–1953	8 years	
Bernard Destremau	1953–1955	3 years	
Benny Berthet	1955–1965	11 years	
Gérard Pilet	1966	1 year	
Marcel Bernard	1967	1 year	

Captain	Tenure	Total	Honours
Robert Salvet	1968	1 year	
Philippe Chatrier	1969–1972	4 years	
Jean-Paul Loth	1973	1 year	
Pierre Darmon	1974–1979	6 years	
Jean-Paul Loth (2)	1980–1987	8 years	1 final
Éric Deblicker	1988–1989	2 years	
Patrice Dominguez	1990	1 year	
Yannick Noah	1991–1992	2 years	1 Davis Cup win
Georges Goven	1993–1994	2 years	
Yannick Noah (2)	1995–1998	4 years	1 Davis Cup win
Guy Forget	1999–2012	14 years	1 Davis Cup win, 3 finals
Arnaud Clément	2013–2015	3 years	1 final
Yannick Noah (2)	2016–2018	3 years	1 Davis Cup win, 1 final
Sébastien Grosjean	2019–current	3 years	

== Historical results ==
=== 2000s ===
Year	Competition	Date	Location	Opponent	Score	Result
2000	World Group, 1st round	4–6 February	Florianópolis, Brazil	Brazil	1–4	Lost
2000	World Group, Qualifying Round	21–23 July	Rennes, France	Austria	5–0	Won
2001	World Group, 1st round	9–11 February	Ghent, Belgium	Belgium	5–0	Won
2001	World Group, quarterfinals	6–8 April	Neuchâtel, Switzerland	Switzerland	3–2	Won
2001	World Group, semifinals	21–23 September	Rotterdam, Netherlands	Netherlands	3–2	Won
2001	World Group, final	30 November–2 December	Melbourne, Australia	Australia	3–2	Champion
2002	World Group, 1st round	8–10 February	Metz, France	Netherlands	3–2	Won
2002	World Group, quarterfinals	5–7 April	Pau, France	Czech Republic	3–2	Won
2002	World Group, semifinals	20–22 September	Paris, France	United States	3–2	Won
2002	World Group, final	29 November–1 December	Paris, France	Russia	2–3	Runner-up
2003	World Group, 1st round	7–9 February	Bucharest, Romania	Romania	4–1	Won
2003	World Group, quarterfinals	4–6 April	Toulouse, France	Switzerland	2–3	Lost
2004	World Group, 1st round	6–8 February	Metz, France	Croatia	4–1	Won
2004	World Group, quarterfinals	9–11 April	Prilly, Switzerland	Switzerland	3–2	Won
2004	World Group, semifinals	24–26 September	Alicante, Spain	Spain	1–4	Lost
2005	World Group, 1st round	4–6 March	Strasbourg, France	Sweden	3–2	Won
2005	World Group, quarterfinals	15–17 July	Moscow, Russia	Russia	2–3	Lost
2006	World Group, 1st round	10–12 February	Halle, Germany	Germany	3–2	Won
2006	World Group, quarterfinals	7–9 April	Pau, France	Russia	1–4	Lost
2007	World Group, 1st round	9–11 February	Clermont-Ferrand, France	Romania	4–1	Won
2007	World Group, quarterfinals	6–8 April	Moscow, Russia	Russia	2–3	Lost
2008	World Group, 1st round	8–10 February	Sibiu, Romania	Romania	5–0	Won
2008	World Group, quarterfinals	11–13 April	Winston-Salem, United States	United States	1–4	Lost
2009	World Group, 1st round	6–8 March	Ostrava, Czech Republic	Czech Republic	2–3	Lost
2009	World Group, Play-offs	18–20 September	Maastricht, Netherlands	Netherlands	4–1	Won

=== 2010s ===
Year	Competition	Date	Location	Opponent	Score	Result
2010	World Group, 1st round	5–7 March	Toulon, France	Germany	4–1	Won
2010	World Group, quarterfinals	9–11 July	Clermont-Ferrand, France	Spain	5–0	Won
2010	World Group, semifinals	17–19 September	Lyon, France	Argentina	5–0	Won
2010	World Group, final	3–5 December	Belgrade, Serbia	Serbia	2–3	Runner-up
2011	World Group, 1st round	4–6 March	Vienna, Austria	Austria	3–2	Won
2011	World Group, quarterfinals	8–10 July	Stuttgart, Germany	Germany	4–1	Won
2011	World Group, semifinals	16–18 September	Córdoba, Spain	Spain	1–4	Lost
2012	World Group, 1st round	10–12 February	Vancouver, Canada	Canada	4–1	Won
2012	World Group, quarterfinals	6–8 April	Roquebrune, France	United States	2–3	Lost
2013	World Group, 1st round	1–3 February	Rouen, France	Israel	5–0	Won
2013	World Group, quarterfinals	5–7 April	Buenos Aires, Argentina	Argentina	2–3	Lost
2014	World Group, 1st round	31 January–2 February	Mouilleron-le-Captif, France	Australia	5–0	Won
2014	World Group, quarterfinals	5–7 April	Nancy, France	Germany	3–2	Won
2014	World Group, semifinals	12–14 September	Paris, France	Czech Republic	4–1	Won
2014	World Group, final	21–23 November	Villeneuve-d'Ascq, France	Switzerland	1–3	Runner-up
2015	World Group, 1st round	6–8 March	Frankfurt, Germany	Germany	3–2	Won
2015	World Group, quarterfinals	17–19 July	London, Great Britain	Great Britain	1–3	Lost
2016	World Group, 1st round	4–6 March	Baie-Mahault, France	Canada	5–0	Won
2016	World Group, quarterfinals	15–17 July	Třinec, Czech Republic	Czech Republic	3–1	Won
2016	World Group, semifinals	16–18 September	Zadar, Croatia	Croatia	2–3	Lost
2017	World Group, 1st round	3–5 February	Tokyo, Japan	Japan	4–1	Won
2017	World Group, quarterfinals	7–9 April	Rouen, France	Great Britain	4–1	Won
2017	World Group, semifinals	15–17 September	Lille, France	Serbia	3–1	Won
2017	World Group, final	24–26 November	Lille, France	Belgium	3–2	Champion
2018	World Group, 1st round	2–4 February	Albertville, France	Netherlands	3–1	Won
2018	World Group, quarterfinals	6–8 April	Genoa, Italy	Italy	3–1	Won
2018	World Group, semifinals	14–16 September	Lille, France	Spain	3–2	Won
2018	World Group, final	23–25 November	Lille, France	Croatia	1–3	Runner-up

== Individual and team records ==
As of 29 October 2022

Record		Details	Report
Youngest player	17 years, 211 days	Daniel Contet versus Brazil on 3 June 1961	
Oldest player	48 years, 305 days	Jean Borotra versus Czechoslovakia on 15 June 1947	
Longest rubber duration	5 hours, 49 minutes	Arnaud Clément defeated Marc Rosset (SUI) on 6 April 2001	
Longest tie duration	21 hours, 2 minutes	France defeated Switzerland on 6–8 April 2001	
Longest tie-break	24 points (13–11)	Sébastien Grosjean lost to Marat Safin (RUS) on 1 December 2002	
Longest final set	28 games (15–13)	Arnaud Clément defeated Marc Rosset (SUI) on 6 April 2001	
Most games in a set	32 (17–15)	Yannick Noah defeated Francisco González (PAR) on 10 March 1985	
Most games in a rubber	82	Yannick Noah lost to Víctor Pecci (PAR) on 8 March 1985	
Most games in a tie	281	France lost 2–3 to Paraguay on 8–10 March 1985	
Most decisive victory (best of 5 rubbers)	15 sets (15–0; 91–23)	France defeated Monaco on 31 May – 1 June 1947	
Most decisive victory (best of 3 rubbers)	3 sets (5–2; 38–32)	France defeated Belgium on 17 September 2022	
Longest winning run	11 ties	From 14 May 1927 (1927 Europe 2nd round) to 31 July 1932 (1932 Challenge Round Final)	

== See also ==
- Davis Cup
- France Billie Jean King Cup team
- France at the Hopman Cup
