= 1925 Wimbledon Championships =

- Date: 22 June – 6 July
- Edition: 45th
- Category: Grand Slam
- Surface: Grass
- Location: Church Road; SW19, Wimbledon, London, United Kingdom
- Venue: All England Lawn Tennis and Croquet Club

Champions

Men's singles
- (France) René Lacoste

Women's singles
- (France) Suzanne Lenglen

Men's doubles
- (France) Jean Borotra / (France) René Lacoste

Women's doubles
- (France) Suzanne Lenglen / (United States) Elizabeth Ryan

Mixed doubles
- (France) Jean Borotra / (France) Suzanne Lenglen
- Wimbledon Championships

The 1925 Wimbledon Championships took place on the outdoor grass courts at the All England Lawn Tennis and Croquet Club in Wimbledon, London, United Kingdom. The tournament ran from 22 June until 6 July. It was the 45th staging of the Wimbledon Championships, and the third Grand Slam tennis event of 1925.

Because Suzanne Lenglen, Jean Borotra and René Lacoste played finals on Saturday, the finals of the Men's Doubles and Mixed Doubles took place on Monday 6 July.

Suzanne Lenglen won all three events she entered; the women's singles, the women's doubles, and the mixed doubles.

== Finals ==
=== Men's singles ===
(France) René Lacoste defeated (France) Jean Borotra, 6–3, 6–3, 4–6, 8–6

=== Women's singles ===
(France) Suzanne Lenglen defeated (United Kingdom) Joan Fry, 6–2, 6–0

=== Men's doubles ===
(France) Jean Borotra / (France) René Lacoste defeated (United States) Raymond Casey / (United States) John Hennessey, 6–4, 11–9, 4–6, 1–6, 6–3

=== Women's doubles ===
(France) Suzanne Lenglen / (United States) Elizabeth Ryan defeated (United Kingdom) Kathleen Bridge / (United Kingdom) Mary McIlquham, 6–2, 6–2

=== Mixed doubles ===
(France) Jean Borotra / (France) Suzanne Lenglen defeated (Italy) Uberto de Morpurgo / (United States) Elizabeth Ryan, 6–3, 6–3

Preceded by 1925 French Championships	Grand Slams	Succeeded by 1925 U.S. National Championships
