= Jean Borotra =

French tennis player (1898–1994)

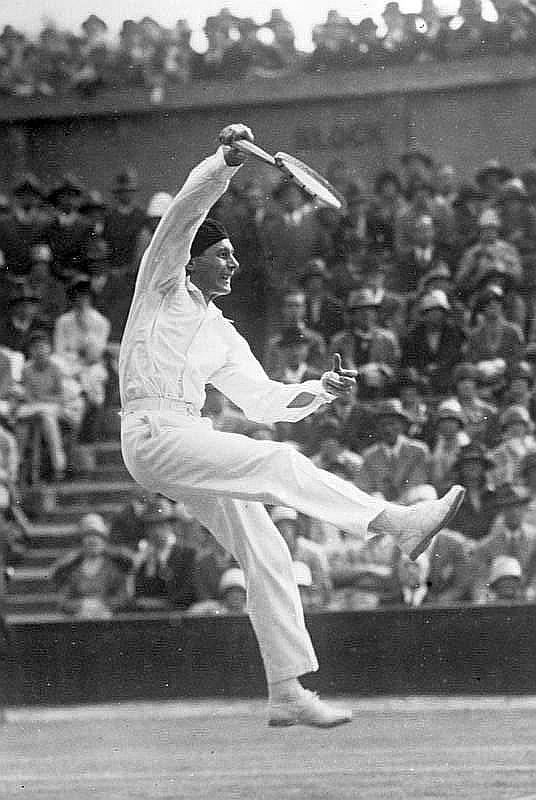
- Jean Borotra in 1931
- Full name: Jean Laurent Robert Borotra
- Country (sports): France
- Born: 13 August 1898 Biarritz, France
- Died: 17 July 1994 (aged 95) Arbonne, France
- Height: 1.86 m (6 ft 1 in)
- Turned pro: 1920 (amateur tour)
- Retired: 1956
- Plays: Right-handed (one-handed backhand)
- Int. Tennis HoF: 1976 (member page)

Singles
- Career record: 654–127 (83.7%)
- Career titles: 69
- Highest ranking: No. 2 (1926, A. Wallis Myers)

Grand Slam singles results
- Australian Open: W (1928)
- French Open: W (1931)
- Wimbledon: W (1924, 1926)
- US Open: F (1926)

Other tournaments
- WHCC: SF (1922)
- WCCC: F (1922)
- Olympic Games: SF – 4th (1924)

Doubles
- Career record: incomplete
- Highest ranking: No. 1 (1925)

Grand Slam doubles results
- Australian Open: W (1928)
- French Open: W (1925, 1928, 1929, 1934, 1936)
- Wimbledon: W (1925, 1932, 1933)

Other doubles tournaments
- WHCC: W (1922)
- WCCC: W (1922)

Grand Slam mixed doubles results
- Australian Open: W (1928)
- French Open: W (1927, 1934)
- Wimbledon: W (1925)
- US Open: W (1926)

Team competitions
- Davis Cup: W (1927, 1928, 1929, 1930, 1931, 1932)
Medal record
Olympic Games
Bronze medal – third place	1924 Paris	Doubles

Jean Laurent Robert Borotra (French pronunciation: [ʒɑ̃ ʁɔbɛʁ bɔ.ʁotʁa], Basque pronunciation: [borotɾa]; 13 August 1898 – 17 July 1994) was a French Basque tennis champion. He was one of the "Four Musketeers" from his country who dominated tennis in the late 1920s and early 1930s. Borotra was imprisoned in Itter Castle during the latter years of World War II and subsequently fought in the Battle for Castle Itter.

== Career ==
Borotra was born in Domaine du Pouy, Biarritz, Aquitaine, the oldest of four children.

Known as "the Bounding Basque", he won four Grand Slam singles titles in the French, Australian, and All England championships. The 1924 French Championship does not count towards his grand slam total as the French was only open to French nationals and members of French clubs. He only failed to win the U.S. Championships, as he was defeated in the final by his countryman René Lacoste in straight sets, thus missing a career Grand Slam. His 1924 Wimbledon victory made him the first player from outside the English-speaking world to win the tournament. His first appearance was in the French Davis Cup team of 1921. He also made the final of the World Covered Court Championships in 1922, losing to Henri Cochet, but won the doubles and mixed doubles. The other major he did well in was the World Hard Court Championships (played on clay) – he won the doubles with Henri Cochet there in 1922.

Borotra was ranked as high as world No. 1 by Bill Tilden in 1930, although Tilden didn't include himself in the ranking. He was ranked No. 2 by A. Wallis Myers of The Daily Telegraph in 1926. Borotra won his last major in 1936 when he teamed up with Marcel Bernard for the French Championship doubles at Roland Garros.

In 1974, Borotra was one of the last three people to be awarded the IOC's Olympic Diploma of Merit. And in 1976, he along with the three other Musketeers were inducted simultaneously into the International Tennis Hall of Fame in Newport, Rhode Island. In 1984, Borotra received a Distinguished Service award from the United States Sports Academy in recognition of his achievements. As the oldest living gentleman's singles champion, Borotra was invited to present the singles champion his trophy at the 100th Wimbledon Championship in 1986.

On 17 July 1994, Borotra, founder and president of honour of the CIFP (International Committee for Fair Play) died at the age of 95, after a short illness. He was buried at Arbonne.

The International Fair Play Committee, which recognises achievements annually, awards a Jean Borotra World Fair Play Trophy. In 1998, the International Club (IC) introduced the Jean Borotra Sportsmanship Award, to recognise tennis players deemed to have shown outstanding sportsmanship throughout their career.

=== Jean Borotra Sportsmanship Award ===
The Jean Borotra Sportsmanship Award is an International Club (IC) award. It was introduced in 1998 to recognise tennis players deemed to have shown outstanding sportsmanship throughout their career.

The selection process involves a panel of international tennis journalists selecting a group of players who meet the IC's core value, namely to "develop, encourage and maintain the highest standards of sportsmanship and understanding among players of all nations and among young players in particular." The shortlist is then endorsed (or added to) by the 38 International Clubs around the world, from which a winner is picked.

The recipient typically receives their award in a private ceremony in London at the All England Club during the Wimbledon Championships.

== Personal life ==
In 1938 Borotra married Mabel de Forest and they had one son. The couple divorced in 1947. In 1988 he married Janine Bourdin.

A member of François de la Rocque's Parti social français (PSF), he became 1st General Commissioner for Education and Sports from August 1940 to April 1942 during Vichy France, leading the Révolution nationale's efforts in sports policy.

Arrested by the Gestapo in November 1942, Borotra was deported to a concentration camp in Germany and then Itter Castle in North Tyrol until May 1945. He was freed from the castle after the Battle of Castle Itter, in which he played a courageous role by vaulting from the fortress and running to a nearby town to summon reinforcements.

== Grand Slam finals ==
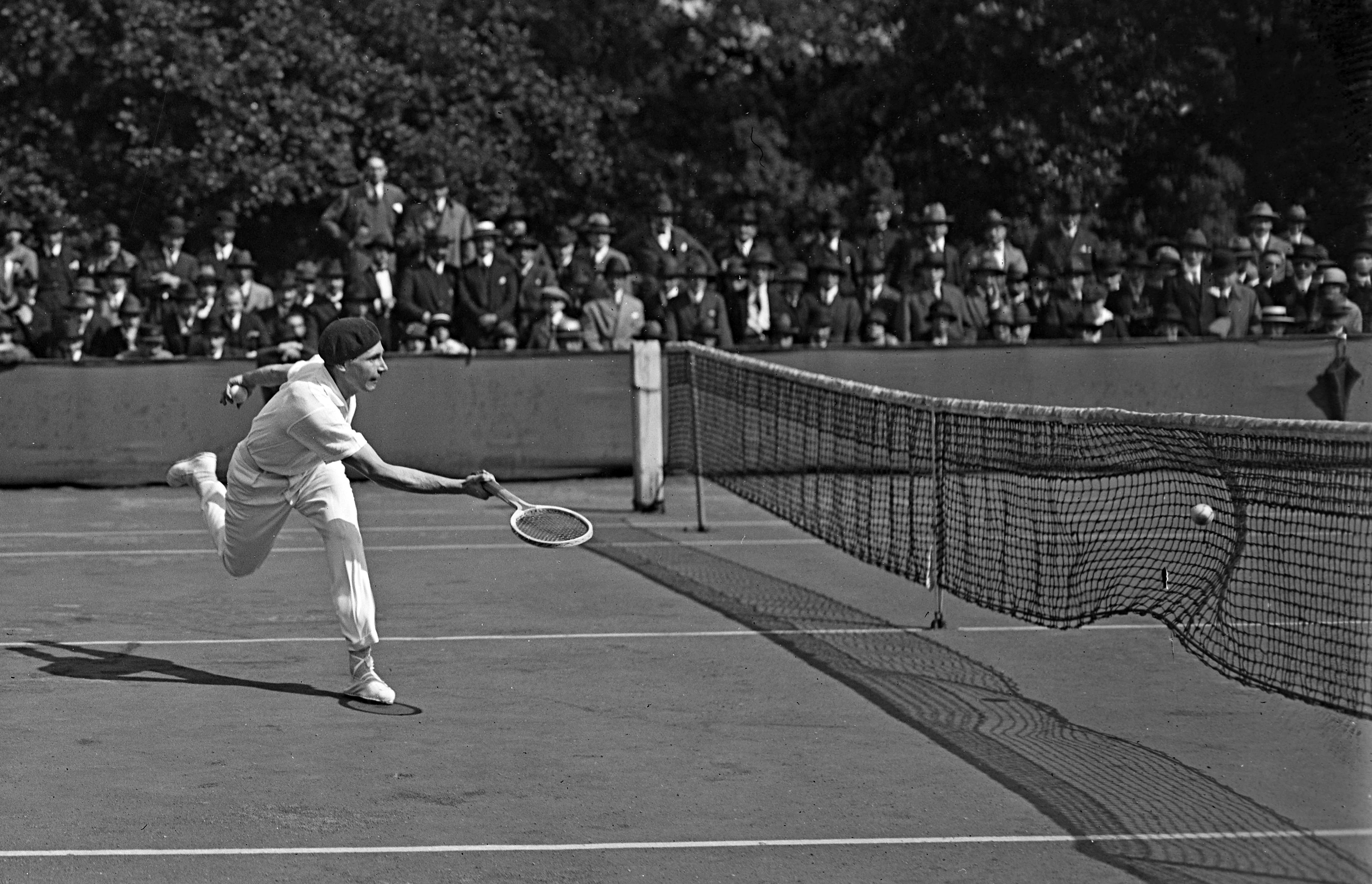
Borotra at the 1924 French Championships.

=== Singles: 10 (4 titles, 6 runner-ups) ===
Result	Year	Championship	Surface	Opponent	Score
Win	1924	Wimbledon	Grass	(France) René Lacoste	6–1, 3–6, 6–1, 3–6, 6–4
Loss	1925	French Championships	Clay	(France) René Lacoste	5–7, 1–6, 4–6
Loss	1925	Wimbledon	Grass	(France) René Lacoste	3–6, 3–6, 6–4, 6–8
Win	1926	Wimbledon	Grass	(United States) Howard Kinsey	8–6, 6–1, 6–3
Loss	1926	U.S. National Championships	Grass	(France) René Lacoste	4–6, 0–6, 4–6
Loss	1927	Wimbledon	Grass	(France) Henri Cochet	6–4, 6–4, 3–6, 4–6, 5–7
Win	1928	Australian Championships	Grass	(Australia) Jack Cummings	6–4, 6–1, 4–6, 5–7, 6–3
Loss	1929	French Championships	Clay	(France) René Lacoste	3–6, 6–2, 0–6, 6–2, 6–8
Loss	1929	Wimbledon	Grass	(France) Henri Cochet	4–6, 3–6, 4–6
Win	1931	French Championships	Clay	(France) Christian Boussus	2–6, 6–4, 7–5, 6–4

=== Doubles: 12 (9 titles – 3 runner-ups) ===
Result	Year	Championship	Surface	Partner	Opponents	Score
Win	1925	French Championships	Clay	(France) René Lacoste	(France) Henri Cochet (France) Jacques Brugnon	7–5, 4–6, 6–3, 2–6, 6–3
Win	1925	Wimbledon	Grass	(France) René Lacoste	(United States) John Hennesey (United States) Raymond Casey	6–4, 11–9, 4–6, 1–6, 6–3
Win	1928	Australian Championships	Grass	(France) Jacques Brugnon	(Australia) Gar Moon (Australia) Jim Willard	6–2, 4–6, 6–4, 6–4
Loss	1927	French Championships	Clay	(France) René Lacoste	(France) Henri Cochet (France) Jacques Brugnon	6–2, 2–6, 0–6, 6–1, 4–6
Win	1928	French Championships	Clay	(France) Jacques Brugnon	(France) Henri Cochet (France) René de Buzelet	6–4, 3–6, 6–2, 3–6, 6–4
Win	1929	French Championships	Clay	(France) René Lacoste	(France) Henri Cochet (France) Jacques Brugnon	6–3, 3–6, 6–3, 3–6, 8–6
Win	1932	Wimbledon	Grass	(France) Jacques Brugnon	(United Kingdom) Pat Hughes (United Kingdom) Fred Perry	6–0, 4–6, 3–6, 7–5, 7–5
Win	1933	Wimbledon	Grass	(France) Jacques Brugnon	(Japan) Ryosuki Nunoi (Japan) Jiro Satoh	4–6, 6–3, 6–3, 7–5
Win	1934	French Championships	Clay	(France) Jacques Brugnon	(Australia) Jack Crawford (Australia) Vivian McGrath	11–9, 6–3, 2–6, 4–6, 9–7
Loss	1934	Wimbledon	Grass	(France) Jacques Brugnon	(United States) George Lott (United States) Lester Stoefen	2–6, 3–6, 4–6
Win	1936	French Championships	Clay	(France) Marcel Bernard	(United Kingdom) Pat Hughes (United Kingdom) Charles Tuckey	6–2, 3–6, 9–7, 6–1
Loss	1939	French Championships	Clay	(France) Jacques Brugnon	(United States) Don McNeill (United States) Charles Harris	6–4, 4–6, 0–6, 6–2, 8–10

=== Mixed doubles: 6 (5 titles, 1 runner-up) ===
Result	Year	Championship	Surface	Partner	Opponents	Score
Win	1925	Wimbledon	Grass	(France) Suzanne Lenglen	(United States) Elizabeth Ryan (Italy) Uberto de Morpurgo	6–3, 6–3
Win	1926	U.S. National Championships	Grass	(United States) Elizabeth Ryan	(United States) Hazel Hotchkiss (France) René Lacoste	6–4, 7–5
Loss	1926	French Championships	Clay	(France) Nanette le Besnerais	(France) Jacques Brugnon (France) Suzanne Lenglen	4–6, 3–6
Win	1927	French Championships	Clay	(France) Marguerite Broquedis	(Spain) Lilí Álvarez (United States) Bill Tilden	6–4, 2–6, 6–2
Win	1928	Australian Championships	Grass	(Australia) Daphne Akhurst	(Australia) Esna Boyd (Australia) Jack Hawkes	default
Win	1934	French Championships	Clay	(France) Colette Rosambert	(United States) Elizabeth Ryan (Australia) Adrian Quist	6–2, 6–4

== Performance timeline ==
Key
W	F	SF	QF	#R	RR	Q#	DNQ	A	NH

(W) winner; (F) finalist; (SF) semifinalist; (QF) quarterfinalist; (#R) rounds 4, 3, 2, 1; (RR) round-robin stage; (Q#) qualification round; (DNQ) did not qualify; (A) absent; (NH) not held; (SR) strike rate (events won / competed); (W–L) win–loss record.

(OF) only for French club members

	1922	1923	1924	1925	1926	1927	1928	1929	1930	1931	1932	1933	1934	1935	1936	SR	W–L	Win %
Grand Slam tournaments																4 / 26	103–22	82.4
Australian	A	A	A	A	A	A	W	A	A	A	A	A	A	A	A	1 / 1	6–0	100
French	OF			F	SF	4R	SF	F	SF	W	A	A	A	A	A	1 / 7	29–6	82.9
Wimbledon	3R	4R	W	F	W	F	QF	F	SF	SF	4R	A	A	2R	A	2 / 12	55–10	84.6
U.S.	A	A	3R	3R	F	QF	3R	A	1R	A	A	A	A	A	A	0 / 6	13–6	68.4
Win–loss	2–1	3–1	9–1	13–3	16–2	11–3	14–3	11–2	9–3	11–1	3–1			1–1				
National representation
Olympics	NH		SF	Not held												0 / 1	5–2	71.4
