= 1924 Wimbledon Championships – Men's doubles =

Men's doubles
- 1924 Wimbledon Championships

Final
- Champions: (United States) Frank Hunter (United States) Vincent Richards
- Runners-up: (United States) Watson Washburn (United States) R. Norris Williams
- Score: 6–3, 3–6, 8–10, 8–6, 6–3

Details
- Draw: 64
- Seeds: –

Events
Singles	men	women		boys	girls
Doubles	men	women	mixed	boys	girls
- Wimbledon Championships

Leslie Godfree and Randolph Lycett were the defending champions, but lost in the semifinals to Watson Washburn and R. Norris Williams.

Frank Hunter and Vincent Richards and defeated Washburn and Williams in the final, 6–3, 3–6, 8–10, 8–6, 6–3 to win the gentlemen's doubles tennis title at the 1924 Wimbledon Championships.

== Draw ==
Key

- Q = Qualifier
- WC = Wild card
- LL = Lucky loser
- Alt = Alternate
- ITF = ITF entry
- PR = Protected ranking
- SR = Special ranking
- SE = Special exempt
- JE = Junior exempt
- JR = Junior Accelerator Programme entrant
- CO = College Accelerator Programme entrant
- NG = Next Gen Accelerator Program entrant
- w/o = Walkover
- r = Retired
- d = Defaulted

=== Finals ===
Quarterfinals
(United Kingdom) Charles Kingsley (United Kingdom) John Cecil Masterman	1	4	4
(United States) Watson Washburn (United States) R. Norris Williams	6	6	6
(Spain) José María Alonso (Spain) Manuel Alonso	4	4	7
(United Kingdom) Leslie Godfree (United Kingdom) Randolph Lycett	6	6	9
(United Kingdom) Patrick Wheatley (United Kingdom) Max Woosnam	2	5	6	4
(United States) Frank Hunter (United States) Vincent Richards	6	7	3	6
(South Africa) Louis Raymond (South Africa) Pat Spence	6	6	6
(Australia) Norman Brookes (United States) Carl Fischer	4	3	2

Semifinals
(United States) Watson Washburn (United States) R. Norris Williams	4	12	6	7
(United Kingdom) Leslie Godfree (United Kingdom) Randolph Lycett	6	10	3	7^{r}
(United States) Frank Hunter (United States) Vincent Richards	6	6	6
(South Africa) Louis Raymond (South Africa) Pat Spence	4	4	2

Final
(United States) Watson Washburn (United States) R. Norris Williams	3	6	10	6	3
(United States) Frank Hunter (United States) Vincent Richards	6	3	8	8	6

=== Top half ===
==== Section 1 ====
First round
(Republic of Ireland) Shirley Dillon (United Kingdom) W Irwin	6	6	6
(Mexico) Félix del Canto (Mexico) Mariano Lozano-Alatorre	0	1	4
(United Kingdom) Alex Drew (United Kingdom) George Thomas	4	4	2
(United Kingdom) Charles Kingsley (United Kingdom) John Cecil Masterman	6	6	6
(United Kingdom) Ernest Charlton (United Kingdom) William Radcliffe	6	9	1	5
(United Kingdom) Leslie Hill (New Zealand) JF Park	8	7	6	7
(United Kingdom) JT Baines (Romania) Nicolae Mișu	6	4	6	4	1
(India) Sydney Jacob (India) Mohammed Sleem	4	6	3	6	6
(United Kingdom) CS Grace (United Kingdom) Bill Swinden	3	1	7	8
(United Kingdom) Donald Greig (United Kingdom) Jack Hillyard	6	6	5	10
(United States) Watson Washburn (United States) R. Norris Williams	5	6	4	6	6
(France) Jean Borotra (France) René Lacoste	7	3	6	4	3
(Japan) Masanosuke Fukuda (Japan) Takeichi Harada	3	6	6	6
(United Kingdom) Gordon Crole-Rees (United Kingdom) Ernest Lamb	6	3	4	2
(United States) Samuel Hardy (United States) Mike Myrick	2	4	6	1
(Switzerland) Hector Fisher (Australia) Alan Watt	6	6	3	6

Second round
(Republic of Ireland) S Dillon (United Kingdom) W Irwin	6	6	1	5	5
(United Kingdom) C Kingsley (United Kingdom) JC Masterman	1	4	6	7	7
(United Kingdom) L Hill (New Zealand) JF Park	6	9	6	3	1
(India) S Jacob (India) M Sleem	4	11	3	6	6
(United Kingdom) D Greig (United Kingdom) J Hillyard	3	3	2
(United States) W Washburn (United States) RN Williams	6	6	6
(Japan) M Fukuda (Japan) T Harada	6	3	5	7	3
(Switzerland) H Fisher (Australia) A Watt	4	6	7	5	6

Third round
(United Kingdom) C Kingsley (United Kingdom) JC Masterman	7	6	6
(India) S Jacob (India) M Sleem	5	4	2
(United States) W Washburn (United States) RN Williams	7	6	7	6
(Switzerland) H Fisher (Australia) A Watt	9	4	5	2

Quarterfinals
(United Kingdom) C Kingsley (United Kingdom) JC Masterman	1	4	4
(United States) W Washburn (United States) RN Williams	6	6	6

==== Section 2 ====
First round
(Netherlands) Count Bylandt (Netherlands) Gerard Leembruggen	6	2	3	3
(United Kingdom) Norman Latchford (United Kingdom) Laddie Wheatcroft	3	6	6	6
(United Kingdom) Percival Davson (United Kingdom) Theodore Mavrogordato	6	6	6
(United Kingdom) Sidney Hepburn (United Kingdom) Tim Horn	2	1	6	2
(Spain) José María Alonso (Spain) Manuel Alonso	4	6	6	6
(United Kingdom) Leonard Lyle (United Kingdom) Albert Prebble	6	3	3	5
(Republic of Ireland) Edward McGuire (United Kingdom) Major Ritchie	6	7	4	8
(Jamaica) BM Clark (United Kingdom) V Rudolf	3	5	6	6
(South Africa) Jack Condon (South Africa) Ivie Richardson	3	6	6	6
(United Kingdom) Norman Dicks (Canada) Henry Mayes	6	1	3	2
(United Kingdom) HR Fussell (United Kingdom) Humphrey Milford	4	1	1
(United Kingdom) Scotter Owen (United Kingdom) Francis Stowe	6	6	6
(United Kingdom) Leslie Godfree (United Kingdom) Randolph Lycett	6	6	4	4	9
(United Kingdom) Harold Aitken (United Kingdom) Alfred Ingram	0	3	6	6	7
(United Kingdom) Harry Coverdale (United Kingdom) Arthur Riseley	1	6	4
(New Zealand) Peter Allison; KD Fairley	6	8	6

Second round
(United Kingdom) N Latchford (United Kingdom) I Wheatcroft	3	6	1
(United Kingdom) P Davson (United Kingdom) T Mavrogordato	6	8	6
(Spain) JM Alonso (Spain) M Alonso	6	8	8	7
(Republic of Ireland) E McGuire (United Kingdom) M Ritchie	4	6	10	5
(South Africa) J Condon (South Africa) I Richardson	6	6	6
(United Kingdom) S Owen (United Kingdom) F Stowe	4	4	3
(United Kingdom) L Godfree (United Kingdom) R Lycett	6	6	4	6
(New Zealand) P Allison; KD Fairley	2	4	6	1

Third round
(United Kingdom) P Davson (United Kingdom) T Mavrogordato	6	3	3
(Spain) JM Alonso (Spain) M Alonso	8	6	6
(South Africa) J Condon (South Africa) I Richardson	8	9	1	0	3
(United Kingdom) L Godfree (United Kingdom) R Lycett	6	7	6	6	6

Quarterfinals
(Spain) JM Alonso (Spain) M Alonso	4	4	7
(United Kingdom) L Godfree (United Kingdom) R Lycett	6	6	9

The nationality of KD Fairley is unknown.

=== Bottom half ===
==== Section 3 ====
First round
BL Cameron (United Kingdom) Leighton Crawford	11	6	6	9
(United Kingdom) George Fletcher (United Kingdom) Leonard West	9	8	47
(United Kingdom) Arthur Gore (United Kingdom) Brian Helmore	4	4	6	4
(United Kingdom) George Birtles (United Kingdom) EG Bisseker	6	6	1	6
(United Kingdom) AH McCormick (Republic of Ireland) Harry Read	w/o
(United Kingdom) Vincent Burr (New Zealand) AE Park
(United Kingdom) Hew Stoker (United Kingdom) GTC Watt	6	1	4	0
(United Kingdom) Patrick Wheatley (United Kingdom) Max Woosnam	2	6	6	6
(United Kingdom) Cyril Eames (South Africa) Gerald Sherwell	1	6	6	10	3
(France) Jacques Brugnon (France) Paul Féret	6	3	3	12	6
(New Zealand) Frank Fisher (New Zealand) John Peacock	6	5	4	3
(United States) Frank Hunter (United States) Vincent Richards	3	7	6	6
(South Africa) Julien Lezard (United States) Jimmy Van Alen	6	4	2
(United Kingdom) LF Davin (United Kingdom) St John Evers	2	6	1^{r}
(United Kingdom) Harold Aitken (United Kingdom) Llewellyn Owen	2	2	2
(Beiyang government) Khoo Hooi-Hye (Japan) Sunao Okamoto	6	6	6

Second round
BL Cameron (United Kingdom) FRL Crawford	3	4	6	4
(United Kingdom) G Birtles (United Kingdom) EG Bisseker	6	6	3	6
(United Kingdom) V Burr (New Zealand) AE Park	1	6	0	2
(United Kingdom) P Wheatley (United Kingdom) M Woosnam	6	1	6	6
(France) J Brugnon (France) P Féret	0	7	1	7	1
(United States) F Hunter (United States) V Richards	6	5	6	5	6
(South Africa) J Lezard (United States) J Van Alen	6	1	0	5
(Beiyang government) H-H Khoo (Japan) S Okamoto	3	6	6	7

Third round
(United Kingdom) G Birtles (United Kingdom) EG Bisseker	5	8	4	4
(United Kingdom) P Wheatley (United Kingdom) M Woosnam	7	6	6	6
(United States) F Hunter (United States) V Richards	6	6	7
(Beiyang government) H-H Khoo (Japan) S Okamoto	4	2	5

Quarterfinals
(United Kingdom) P Wheatley (United Kingdom) M Woosnam	2	5	6	4
(United States) F Hunter (United States) V Richards	6	7	3	6

The nationality of BL Cameron is unknown.

==== Section 4 ====
First round
(United Kingdom) Royden Dash (United Kingdom) Roy Poland	6	6	4	6
(United Kingdom) Ronald MacInnes (United Kingdom) E Reed	3	3	6	4
(South Africa) Louis Raymond (South Africa) Pat Spence	4	6	6	6
(United Kingdom) Herbert Roper Barrett (United States) Amos Wilder	6	1	2	4
(India) Syed Mohammad Hadi (India) Donald Rutnam	6	6	6
(Australia) James Bayley (Australia) Aubrey Willard	3	3	4
(United Kingdom) J Duminy (United Kingdom) Charles Roupell	4	3	6	1
(United Kingdom) Brian Gilbert (United Kingdom) Algernon Kingscote	6	6	2	6
(Netherlands) Cornelis Bryan (Netherlands) Hendrik Timmer	10	6	4	6
(United Kingdom) Ambrose Dudley (United Kingdom) Henry Standring	8	3	6	4
(Sweden) Carl-Erik von Braun (India) Athar-Ali Fyzee	6	2	2	1
(Australia) Norman Brookes (United States) Carl Fischer	4	6	6	6
(United Kingdom) JM Bell (United Kingdom) Eric Portlock	w/o
(Belgium) Jean Washer (Belgium) Georges Watson
(United Kingdom) Teddy Higgs (United Kingdom) Frank Jarvis	1	6	6	1	6
(United Kingdom) Walter Crawley (United Kingdom) Noel Turnbull	6	1	4	6	4

Second round
(United Kingdom) R Dash (United Kingdom) R Poland	1	2	3
(South Africa) L Raymond (South Africa) P Spence	6	6	6
(India) SM Hadi (India) D Rutnam	4	2	3
(United Kingdom) B Gilbert (United Kingdom) A Kingscote	6	6	6
(Netherlands) C Bryan (Netherlands) H Timmer	1	4	3
(Australia) N Brookes (United States) C Fischer	6	6	6
(Belgium) J Washer (Belgium) G Watson	6	9	1	7
(United Kingdom) E Higgs (United Kingdom) F Jarvis	4	7	6	5

Third round
(South Africa) L Raymond (South Africa) P Spence	6	7	6
(United Kingdom) B Gilbert (United Kingdom) A Kingscote	2	5	2
(Australia) N Brookes (United States) C Fischer	6	3	1	6	6
(Belgium) J Washer (Belgium) G Watson	4	6	6	3	2

Quarterfinals
(South Africa) L Raymond (South Africa) P Spence	6	6	6
(Australia) N Brookes (United States) C Fischer	4	3	2
