= 1924 Wimbledon Championships – Mixed doubles =

Mixed doubles
- 1924 Wimbledon Championships

Final
- Champions: (United Kingdom) Brian Gilbert (United Kingdom) Kitty McKane
- Runners-up: (United Kingdom) Leslie Godfree (United Kingdom) Dorothy Shepherd-Barron
- Score: 6–3, 3–6, 6–3

Details
- Draw: 64
- Seeds: –

Events
| Singles | men | women | | boys | girls |
| Doubles | men | women | mixed | boys | girls |
- Wimbledon Championships

Randolph Lycett and Elizabeth Ryan were the defending champions, but lost in the semi-finals to eventual champions Brian Gilbert and Kitty McKane.

Gilbert and McKane defeated Leslie Godfree and Dorothy Shepherd-Barron in the final, 6–3, 3–6, 6–3 to win the mixed doubles tennis title at the 1924 Wimbledon Championships.

== Draw ==
Key

- Q = Qualifier
- WC = Wild card
- LL = Lucky loser
- Alt = Alternate
- ITF = ITF entry
- PR = Protected ranking
- SR = Special ranking
- SE = Special exempt
- JE = Junior exempt
- JR = Junior Accelerator Programme entrant
- CO = College Accelerator Programme entrant
- NG = Next Gen Accelerator Program entrant
- w/o = Walkover
- r = Retired
- d = Defaulted

=== Finals ===
Quarterfinals
(United States) Frank Hunter (United States) Lilian Scharman | 7 | 5
(United Kingdom) Leslie Godfree (United Kingdom) Dorothy Shepherd-Barron | 9 | 7
(United Kingdom) Max Woosnam (United Kingdom) Phyllis Covell
(France) Jean Borotra (France) Suzanne Lenglen | w/o
(United States) R. Norris Williams (United States) Hazel Wightman | 7 | 2 | 2
(United Kingdom) Brian Gilbert (United Kingdom) Kitty McKane | 5 | 6 | 6
(United Kingdom) Ernest Lamb (United Kingdom) Ermyntrude Harvey | 3 | 6 | 7
(United Kingdom) Noel Turnbull (United Kingdom) Doris Craddock | 6 | 3 | 5

Semifinals
(United Kingdom) Leslie Godfree (United Kingdom) Dorothy Shepherd-Barron | 6 | 4 | 6
(United Kingdom) Max Woosnam (United Kingdom) Phyllis Covell | 4 | 6 | 4
(United Kingdom) Brian Gilbert (United Kingdom) Kitty McKane | 6 | 6
(United Kingdom) Ernest Lamb (United Kingdom) Ermyntrude Harvey | 2 | 4

Final
(United Kingdom) Leslie Godfree (United Kingdom) Dorothy Shepherd-Barron | 3 | 6 | 3
(United Kingdom) Brian Gilbert (United Kingdom) Kitty McKane | 6 | 3 | 6

=== Top half ===
==== Section 1 ====
First round
(United Kingdom) Ernest Charlton (United Kingdom) Joan Reid-Thomas | 6 | 6
(India) Syed Mohammad Hadi (United Kingdom) Beatrice Brown | 3 | 2
(New Zealand) John Peacock (South Africa) Irene Peacock | 1 | 6 | 2
(New Zealand) JF Park (United Kingdom) Norah Middleton | 6 | 3 | 6
(United States) Frank Hunter (United States) Lilian Scharman | 10 | 6
(United Kingdom) Vincent Burr (United Kingdom) Phoebe Holcroft | 8 | 3
(Belgium) Jean Washer (United Kingdom) Naomi Jackson-Fielden
(United Kingdom) LF Davin (United Kingdom) Molly Welsh | w/o
(United Kingdom) Gordon Crole-Rees (United Kingdom) Doreen Busby | 4 | 6 | 6
(United Kingdom) St John Evers (United Kingdom) Enid Clarke | 6 | 2 | 1
(United Kingdom) George Golding (United Kingdom) Annie Cobb | 1 | 6 | 6
(United Kingdom) Brian Helmore (United Kingdom) Agnes Tuckey | 6 | 4 | 8
(United Kingdom) Leslie Godfree (United Kingdom) Dorothy Shepherd-Barron | 6 | 3 | 6
(South Africa) Gerald Sherwell (United Kingdom) Dorothy Hill | 1 | 6 | 3
(United Kingdom) Theodore Mavrogordato (United Kingdom) Mabel Parton | 7 | 5
(United Kingdom) EG Bisseker (United Kingdom) Marie Hazel | 9 | 7

Second round
(United Kingdom) E Charlton (United Kingdom) J Reid-Thomas | 3 | 6
(New Zealand) JF Park (United Kingdom) N Middleton | 6 | 8
(United States) F Hunter (United States) L Scharman | 8 | 5 | 8
(Belgium) J Washer (United Kingdom) N Jackson-Fielden | 6 | 7 | 6
(United Kingdom) G Crole-Rees (United Kingdom) D Busby | 7 | 6
(United Kingdom) B Helmore (United Kingdom) A Tuckey | 5 | 3
(United Kingdom) L Godfree (United Kingdom) D Shepherd-Barron | 6 | 6
(United Kingdom) EG Bisseker (United Kingdom) M Hazel | 3 | 3

Third round
(New Zealand) JF Park (United Kingdom) N Middleton | 4 | 6 | 1
(United States) F Hunter (United States) L Scharman | 6 | 2 | 6
(United Kingdom) G Crole-Rees (United Kingdom) D Busby | 6 | 4
(United Kingdom) L Godfree (United Kingdom) D Shepherd-Barron | 8 | 6

Quarterfinals
(United States) F Hunter (United States) L Scharman | 7 | 5
(United Kingdom) L Godfree (United Kingdom) D Shepherd-Barron | 9 | 7

==== Section 2 ====
First round
(United States) Watson Washburn (United States) Eleanor Goss | 6 | 6
(India) Athar-Ali Fyzee (United Kingdom) Ariadne Rodocanachi | 1 | 1
(United Kingdom) Max Woosnam (United Kingdom) Phyllis Covell | 7 | 6
(United Kingdom) George Stoddart (United Kingdom) Joy Coote | 5 | 0
(India) Sydney Jacob (United Kingdom) Joan Ridley | 6 | 6
(United Kingdom) IFL Elliot (United Kingdom) Mrs IFL Elliot | 3 | 1
(Netherlands) Cornelis Bryan (United States) Eleonora Sears | 1 | 1
(United Kingdom) William Radcliffe (United Kingdom) Eleanor Rose | 6 | 6
(United Kingdom) Roy Poland (United Kingdom) CJ Tyrrell | 6 | 6
(United Kingdom) Alfred Ingram (United Kingdom) Peggy Pleydell-Bouverie | 4 | 1
(United Kingdom) Cyril Eames (United Kingdom) Winifred Beamish | 6 | 6
(United Kingdom) Humphrey Milford (United Kingdom) Mrs HV Parbury | 2 | 0
(United Kingdom) Charles Kingsley (United Kingdom) NQ Radcliffe-Platt | w/o
(South Africa) Julien Lezard (United Kingdom) Joan Barrett
(United Kingdom) George Fletcher (United Kingdom) OM Walker | 0 | 1
(France) Jean Borotra (France) Suzanne Lenglen | 6 | 6

Second round
(United States) W Washburn (United States) E Goss | 6 | 4 | 1
(United Kingdom) M Woosnam (United Kingdom) P Covell | 4 | 6 | 6
(India) S Jacob (United Kingdom) J Ridley | 4 | 3
(United Kingdom) W Radcliffe (United Kingdom) E Rose | 6 | 6
(United Kingdom) R Poland (United Kingdom) CJ Tyrrell | 4 | 6 | 6
(United Kingdom) C Eames (United Kingdom) W Beamish | 6 | 3 | 3
(South Africa) J Lezard (United Kingdom) J Barrett | 0 | 1
(France) J Borotra (France) S Lenglen | 6 | 6

Third round
(United Kingdom) M Woosnam (United Kingdom) P Covell | 6 | 6 | 6
(United Kingdom) W Radcliffe (United Kingdom) W Rose | 3 | 8 | 4
(United Kingdom) R Poland (United Kingdom) CJ Tyrrell | 2 | 3
(France) J Borotra (France) S Lenglen | 6 | 6

Quarterfinals
(United Kingdom) M Woosnam (United Kingdom) P Covell
(France) J Borotra (France) S Lenglen | w/o

=== Bottom half ===
==== Section 3 ====
First round
(Spain) José María Alonso (United Kingdom) Enid Head | 3 | 5
(Republic of Ireland) Shirley Dillon (Republic of Ireland) Mrs RRW Jackson | 6 | 7
(United Kingdom) Bill Swinden (United Kingdom) E Kelsey | 5 | 1
(United Kingdom) Alex Drew (United Kingdom) Claire Beckingham | 7 | 6
(Australia) James Bayley (United Kingdom) Helen Bourne | 4 | 7
(United Kingdom) Jack Hillyard (United Kingdom) Phyllis Satterthwaite | 6 | 9
(United States) R. Norris Williams (United States) Hazel Wightman | 6 | 6
(United Kingdom) Charles Roupell (United Kingdom) Mrs HB Weston | 0 | 3
(United Kingdom) Brian Gilbert (United Kingdom) Kitty McKane | 6 | 7
(United Kingdom) Teddy Higgs (United Kingdom) Sylvia Lumley-Ellis | 3 | 5
(South Africa) Pat Spence (United Kingdom) Joan Austin | 6 | 4 | 1
(United Kingdom) Randolph Lycett (United States) Elizabeth Ryan | 4 | 6 | 6
(South Africa) Jack Condon (United States) Molla Mallory | 6 | 6
(Netherlands) Gerard Leembruggen (United Kingdom) Hilary Stebbing | 3 | 0
(United States) Carl Fischer (United States) Edith Sigourney | 6 | 6
(United Kingdom) George Thomas (United Kingdom) Hazel Hogarth | 3 | 2

Second round
(Republic of Ireland) S Dillon (Republic of Ireland) Mrs RRW Jackson | 8 | 6
(United Kingdom) A Drew (United Kingdom) C Beckingham | 6 | 4
(United Kingdom) J Hillyard (United Kingdom) P Satterthwaite | 6 | 5
(United States) RN Williams (United States) H Wightman | 8 | 7
(United Kingdom) B Gilbert (United Kingdom) K McKane | 6 | 1 | 8
(United Kingdom) R Lycett (United States) E Ryan | 4 | 6 | 6
(South Africa) J Condon (United States) M Mallory | 6 | 6
(United States) C Fischer (United States) E Sigourney | 3 | 4

Third round
(Republic of Ireland) S Dillon (Republic of Ireland) Mrs RRW Jackson | 4 | 3
(United States) RN Williams (United States) H Wightman | 6 | 6
(United Kingdom) B Gilbert (United Kingdom) K McKane | 6 | 6
(South Africa) J Condon (United States) M Mallory | 3 | 2

Quarterfinals
(United States) RN Williams (United States) H Wightman | 7 | 2 | 2
(United Kingdom) B Gilbert (United Kingdom) K McKane | 5 | 6 | 6

==== Section 4 ====
First round
(United Kingdom) Eric Portlock (United Kingdom) Irene Maltby | w/o
(United Kingdom) Ernest Lamb (United Kingdom) Ermyntrude Harvey
(United Kingdom) Ambrose Dudley (United Kingdom) JL Colegate | 6 | 6
(France) Paul Féret (France) Elizabeth Macready | 4 | 1
(Netherlands) Hendrik Timmer (Netherlands) Kea Bouman | 7 | 6
(New Zealand) Frank Fisher (United Kingdom) Honor Woolrych | 5 | 4
(United Kingdom) Donald Greig (United Kingdom) Dorothea Lambert Chambers | 7 | 6 | 3
(United Kingdom) Patrick Wheatley (United Kingdom) Evelyn Colyer | 9 | 3 | 6
(United Kingdom) Arthur Berger (United Kingdom) Winifred McNair | 4 | 6 | 2
(Australia) Aubrey Willard (United Kingdom) Mrs Bruce-May | 6 | 3 | 6
(Canada) Charles Leslie (Canada) I Haselden | 1 | 0
(United Kingdom) Noel Turnbull (United Kingdom) Doris Craddock | 6 | 6
(United Kingdom) AH McCormick (Republic of Ireland) Hilda Wallis | 4 | 6 | 4
BL Cameron (United Kingdom) R Watson | 6 | 4 | 6
(Belgium) Georges Watson (United Kingdom) Peggy Dransfield | 4 | 3
(United States) Vincent Richards (United States) Marion Jessup | 6 | 6

Second round
(United Kingdom) E Lamb (United Kingdom) E Harvey | 6 | 3 | 6
(United Kingdom) A Dudley (United Kingdom) JL Colegate | 3 | 6 | 3
(Netherlands) H Timmer (Netherlands) K Bouman | 2 | 7
(United Kingdom) P Wheatley (United Kingdom) E Colyer | 6 | 8
(Australia) A Willard (United Kingdom) Mrs Bruce-May | 3 | 0
(United Kingdom) N Turnbull (United Kingdom) D Craddock | 6 | 6
BL Cameron (United Kingdom) R Watson | 3 | 1
(United States) V Richards (United States) M Jessup | 6 | 6

Third round
(United Kingdom) E Lamb (United Kingdom) E Harvey | 3 | 6 | 6
(United Kingdom) P Wheatley (United Kingdom) E Colyer | 6 | 2 | 2
(United Kingdom) N Turnbull (United Kingdom) D Craddock | 6 | 4 | 6
(United States) V Richards (United States) M Jessup | 3 | 6 | 1

Quarterfinals
(United Kingdom) E Lamb (United Kingdom) E Harvey | 3 | 6 | 7
(United Kingdom) N Turnbull (United Kingdom) D Craddock | 6 | 3 | 5

The nationality of BL Cameron is unknown.
