= 1924 Wimbledon Championships – Men's singles =

Men's singles
- 1924 Wimbledon Championships

Final
- Champion: (France) Jean Borotra
- Runner-up: (France) René Lacoste
- Score: 6–1, 3–6, 6–1, 3–6, 6–4

Details
- Draw: 128
- Seeds: –

Events
Singles	men	women		boys	girls
Doubles	men	women	mixed	boys	girls
- Wimbledon Championships

Jean Borotra defeated René Lacoste 6–1, 3–6, 6–1, 3–6, 6–4 in the final to win the gentlemen's singles tennis title at the 1924 Wimbledon Championships. Bill Johnston was the defending champion, but did not participate.

== Draw ==
Key

- Q = Qualifier
- WC = Wild card
- LL = Lucky loser
- Alt = Alternate
- ITF = ITF entry
- PR = Protected ranking
- SR = Special ranking
- SE = Special exempt
- JE = Junior exempt
- JR = Junior Accelerator Programme entrant
- CO = College Accelerator Programme entrant
- NG = Next Gen Accelerator Program entrant
- w/o = Walkover
- r = Retired
- d = Defaulted

=== Finals ===
Quarterfinals
(France) René Lacoste	6	5	6	6
(Belgium) Jean Washer	1	7	4	2
(United Kingdom) Algernon Kingscote	7	4	3	4
(United States) R. Norris Williams	5	6	6	6
(France) Jean Borotra	6	4	6	6
(United States) Vincent Richards	4	6	0	3
(United States) Watson Washburn	0	5	15
(South Africa) Louis Raymond	6	7	17

Semifinals
(France) René Lacoste	6	3	6	6
(United States) R. Norris Williams	1	6	2	3
(France) Jean Borotra	6	6	7
(South Africa) Louis Raymond	2	4	5

Final
(France) René Lacoste	1	6	1	6	4
(France) Jean Borotra	6	3	6	3	6

=== Top half ===
==== Section 1 ====
First round
(United Kingdom) Charles Kingsley	8	4	4	1
(India) Syed Mohammad Hadi	6	6	6	6
(United Kingdom) LF Davin	w/o
(Straits Settlements) Khoo Hooi-Hye
(Spain) Manuel Alonso	6	6	6
(United Kingdom) Colin Gregory	1	3	4
(France) René Lacoste	6	4	6	6
(Japan) Sunao Okamoto	2	6	3	4
(Netherlands) Gerard Leembruggen	1	3	6	6	6
(United Kingdom) GW Todd	6	6	4	0	1
(United Kingdom) WDK Thellusson	8	6	3	6	4
(United Kingdom) Jack Weakley	6	8	6	4	6
(United Kingdom) Brian Gilbert	6	6	6
(United Kingdom) Noel Turnbull	3	4	4
(South Africa) Jack Condon	7	6	6
(United States) Amos Wilder	5	0	2

Second round
(India) SM Hadi	7	6	6
(Straits Settlements) H-H Khoo	5	3	2
(Spain) M Alonso	6	2	15	3	2
(France) R Lacoste	2	6	13	6	6
(Netherlands) G Leembruggen	6	1	1	2
(United Kingdom) J Weakley	2	6	6	6
(United Kingdom) B Gilbert	5	6	9	6
(South Africa) J Condon	7	2	7	2

Third round
(India) SM Hadi	5	3	3
(France) R Lacoste	7	6	6
(United Kingdom) J Weakley	0	2	0
(United Kingdom) B Gilbert	6	6	6

Fourth round
(France) R Lacoste	6	6	6
(United Kingdom) B Gilbert	3	3	2

==== Section 2 ====
First round
(United Kingdom) Alfred Ingram	4	6	9	6
(Mexico) Félix del Canto	6	1	7	1
(Belgium) Jean Washer	6	6	6
(New Zealand) Peter Allison	4	3	3
(United Kingdom) Randolph Lycett	6	7	6
(Republic of Ireland) F Crosbie	3	5	4
(United Kingdom) George Fletcher	6	4	3
(Australia) James Bayley	8	6	6
(New Zealand) JF Park	1	2	2
(United States) Frank Hunter	6	6	6
(United Kingdom) WHM Aitken	2	3	5
(United Kingdom) Jack Hillyard	6	6	7
(India) Donald Rutnam	6	6	6
(United Kingdom) James Legg	1	2	3
(Australia) Norman Brookes	6	6	6
(Switzerland) Hector Fisher	2	2	3

Second round
(United Kingdom) A Ingram	3	6	6	6	3
(Belgium) J Washer	6	8	3	2	6
(United Kingdom) R Lycett	5	4	6	3
(Australia) J Bayley	7	6	3	6
(United States) F Hunter	6	6	6
(United Kingdom) J Hillyard	1	3	2
(India) D Rutnam	2	2	6	1
(Australia) N Brookes	6	6	2	6

Third round
(Belgium) J Washer	6	0	6	6	7
(Australia) J Bayley	4	6	2	8	5
(United States) F Hunter	6	3	4	7	3
(Australia) N Brookes	3	6	6	5	6

Fourth round
(Belgium) J Washer	6	7	6
(Australia) N Brookes	2	5	4

==== Section 3 ====
First round
(Australia) Denis Browne	4	11	3	2
(Japan) Masanosuke Fukuda	6	9	6	6
(United Kingdom) Theodore Mavrogordato	6	3	7	6
(United Kingdom) George Stoddart	3	6	5	1
(United Kingdom) Teddy Higgs	4	0	0
(India) Sydney Jacob	6	6	6
(United Kingdom) Hew Stoker	3	5	6	6	6
(United Kingdom) Brian Helmore	6	7	3	0	3
(United Kingdom) Norman Dicks	6	6	6
(United Kingdom) TA Digby	0	2	1
(United Kingdom) Major Ritchie	6	6	0
(Sweden) Carl-Erik von Braun	1	0	0^{r}
(United Kingdom) Lionel Alderson	3	6	4	2
(United Kingdom) Gordon Crole-Rees	6	3	6	6
(United Kingdom) Frank Jarvis	0	2	4
(United Kingdom) Algernon Kingscote	6	6	6

Second round
(Japan) M Fukuda	1	7	6	6
(United Kingdom) T Mavrogordato	6	5	4	4
(India) S Jacob	6	7	6
(United Kingdom) H Stoker	3	5	2
(United Kingdom) NEV Dicks	6	5	5	6	4
(United Kingdom) M Ritchie	4	7	7	4	6
(United Kingdom) G Crole-Rees	2	5	6
(United Kingdom) A Kingscote	6	7	8

Third round
(Japan) M Fukuda	0	2	4
(India) S Jacob	6	6	6
(United Kingdom) M Ritchie	4	3	3
(United Kingdom) A Kingscote	6	6	6

Fourth round
(India) S Jacob	3	3	3
(United Kingdom) A Kingscote	6	6	6

==== Section 4 ====
First round
(France) Alain Gerbault	w/o
(United Kingdom) Ambrose Dudley
(Jamaica) Bertrand Clark	7	5	2	6	4
(United Kingdom) Vincent Burr	5	7	6	3	6
(United Kingdom) Cyril Eames	0	8	4
(France) Paul Féret	6	10	6
(United States) R. Norris Williams	6	6	6
(Republic of Ireland) Edward McGuire	1	4	2
(United Kingdom) Bill Swinden	6	6	7
(United Kingdom) Henry Hunter	3	4	5
(United Kingdom) John Cecil Masterman	w/o
(Romania) Nicolae Mișu
(South Africa) Ivie Richardson	2	6	6	10
(New Zealand) John Peacock	6	1	1	8
(United Kingdom) St John Evers	4	2	1
(United Kingdom) Keats Lester	6	6	6

Second round
(United Kingdom) A Dudley	6	6	5	8
(United Kingdom) V Burr	2	2	7	6
(France) P Féret	4	6	6	4
(United States) RN Williams	6	4	8	6
(United Kingdom) W Swinden	2	2	4
(Romania) N Mișu	6	6	6
(South Africa) I Richardson	6	6	6
(United Kingdom) K Lester	4	2	2

Third round
(United Kingdom) A Dudley	3	0	4
(United States) RN Williams	6	6	6
(Romania) N Mișu	2	3	1^{r}
(South Africa) I Richardson	6	6	3

Fourth round
(United States) RN Williams	6	6	6
(South Africa) I Richardson	1	1	4

=== Bottom half ===
==== Section 5 ====
First round
(United Kingdom) AW Davson	2	1	1
(India) Mohammed Sleem	6	6	6
(United Kingdom) AK Evans	3	2	7
(United Kingdom) Leslie Hill	6	6	9
(South Africa) Pat Spence	6	6	6
(Mexico) Mariano Lozano-Alatorre	1	2	0
(Netherlands) Cornelis Bryan	3	1	6	6	6
(United Kingdom) CS Grace	6	6	4	2	3
(United Kingdom) Neville Willford	9	6	6	6
(France) Jean Borotra	11	4	3	3
(United Kingdom) NC Abrams	2	1	3
(United Kingdom) Max Woosnam	6	6	6
(United States) Carl Fischer	7	6	6
(United Kingdom) V Rudolf	5	3	3
(United Kingdom) HR Fussell	1	4	1
(United Kingdom) Gordon Lowe	6	6	6

Second round
(India) M Sleem	6	6	6
(United Kingdom) L Hill	3	3	1
(South Africa) P Spence	6	7	6
(Netherlands) C Bryan	3	5	4
(France) J Borotra	6	7	2	6
(United Kingdom) M Woosnam	3	5	6	4
(United States) C Fischer	1	3	3
(United Kingdom) G Lowe	6	6	6

Third round
(India) M Sleem	4	6	3	2
(South Africa) P Spence	6	1	6	6
(France) J Borotra	6	6	6
(United Kingdom) G Lowe	1	3	4

Fourth round
(South Africa) P Spence	2	12	6	0
(France) J Borotra	6	14	3	6

==== Section 6 ====
First round
(United Kingdom) JM Bell	6	6	3	6
(India) EBN Taylor	2	3	6	3
(United States) Jimmy Van Alen	5	6	6	5	1
(United Kingdom) Arthur Lowe	7	3	4	7	6
(United Kingdom) Roy Poland	6	7	6
(United Kingdom) William Radcliffe	1	5	3
(United Kingdom) Donald Greig	2	6	6	6
(United Kingdom) EG Bisseker	6	2	2	4
(United Kingdom) Royden Dash	7	6	6
(Spain) José María Alonso	5	2	2
(New Zealand) AE Park	1	1	0
(United States) Vincent Richards	6	6	6
(United Kingdom) RG Stone	0	3	2
(United Kingdom) Eliot Crawshay-Williams	6	6	6
(United Kingdom) Neville Deed	4	1	3
(Japan) Takeichi Harada	6	6	6

Second round
(United Kingdom) JM Bell	6	1	1	1
(United Kingdom) A Lowe	3	6	6	6
(United Kingdom) R Poland	4	2	3
(United Kingdom) D Greig	6	6	6
(United Kingdom) R Dash	0	4	3
(United States) V Richards	6	6	6
(United Kingdom) E Crawshay-Williams	2	1	4
(Japan) T Harada	6	6	6

Third round
(United Kingdom) A Lowe	6	6	2	2	4
(United Kingdom) D Greig	2	2	6	6	6
(United States) V Richards	6	6	6
(Japan) T Harada	4	1	2

Fourth round
(United Kingdom) D Greig	2	6	2	5
(United States) V Richards	6	4	6	7

==== Section 7 ====
First round
(United States) Watson Washburn	6	6	7
(United Kingdom) Leslie Godfree	4	0	5
(Canada) Henry Mayes	6	6	6
(United Kingdom) Mark Hick	1	1	3
(Belgium) Georges Watson	3	6	3	6	6
(South Africa) Julien Lezard	6	1	6	3	0
(United Kingdom) Leighton Crawford	6	3	15	6
(United Kingdom) George Thomas	3	6	13	3
(United Kingdom) Charles Roupell	7	5	7	2	6
(United Kingdom) Percival Davson	5	7	5	6	1
(United Kingdom) Monty Temple	4	0	4
(Australia) Alan Watt	6	6	6
(India) Hassan Ali Fyzee	w/o
(United Kingdom) Scotter Owen
(United Kingdom) Henry Standring	6	6	6
(Canada) Charles Leslie	1	2	0

Second round
(United States) W Washburn	4	6	6	5	6
(Canada) H Mayes	6	4	0	7	4
(Belgium) G Watson	2	3	0
(United Kingdom) FRL Crawford	6	6	6
(United Kingdom) C Roupell	2	4	6	6	3
(Australia) A Watt	6	6	0	2	6
(United Kingdom) S Owen	4	4	5
(United Kingdom) H Standring	6	6	7

Third round
(United States) W Washburn	6	6	4	6
(United Kingdom) FRL Crawford	4	4	6	2
(Australia) A Watt	6	6	6
(United Kingdom) H Standring	3	4	3

Fourth round
(United States) W Washburn	0	6	6	6
(Australia) A Watt	6	3	4	4

==== Section 8 ====
First round
(Netherlands) Hendrik Timmer	7	2	5	6
(New Zealand) Frank Fisher	5	6	7	3
(South Africa) Louis Raymond	6	6	6
(United Kingdom) Lewis Michell	1	2	2
(United Kingdom) Alex Drew	7	3	6	6	6
(United Kingdom) Arthur Belgrave	9	6	3	0	2
(United Kingdom) Ronald MacInnes	3	5	1
(France) Jacques Brugnon	6	7	6
(India) Athar-Ali Fyzee	6	6	6
(South Africa) Gerald Sherwell	2	1	2
(United Kingdom) Walter Crawley	11	6	9
(Republic of Ireland) Shirley Dillon	9	1	7
(United Kingdom) Patrick Wheatley	11	8	6
(United Kingdom) Gerry Millard	9	6	1
(United Kingdom) Alex Blair	4	3	1
(Australia) James Willard	6	6	6

Second round
(Netherlands) H Timmer	4	4	4
(South Africa) L Raymond	6	6	6
(United Kingdom) A Drew	0	3	1
(France) J Brugnon	6	6	6
(India) AA Fyzee	3	5	4
(United Kingdom) W Crawley	6	7	6
(United Kingdom) P Wheatley	4	7	5	7	2
(Australia) J Willard	6	5	7	5	1^{r}

Third round
(South Africa) L Raymond	8	2	4	12	6
(France) J Brugnon	6	6	6	10	4
(United Kingdom) W Crawley	3	4	6
(United Kingdom) P Wheatley	6	6	8

Fourth round
(South Africa) L Raymond	7	6	6
(United Kingdom) P Wheatley	5	0	0

Preceded by 1924 Australasian Championships – Men's singles	Grand Slam men's singles	Succeeded by 1924 U.S. National Championships – Men's singles
