= North Island Open Championships =

Defunct tennis tournament
- Tour: ILTF; ITF
- Founded: 1932; 94 years ago
- Abolished: 1978; 48 years ago
- Location: Christchurch; Hutt Valley; Hamilton; Lower Hutt; Palmerston North; Wellington Whanganui
- Venue: Various
- Surface: Grass (1934-75); Hard (1976-78)

The North Island Open Championships was a regional men's and women's grass court then later hard court tennis tournament founded in 1932 as the North Island Championships. The tournament was first played at the Lower Hutt Tennis Club (f.1927), Lower Hutt, Wellington Province, New Zealand. The tournament was played at other locations until 1978 when it was discontinued as part of the ILTF Independent Circuit.

== History ==
This tournament has it origins in the Wairarapa Provincial Lawn Tennis Association Championships founded in 1899 and played at the Masterton, Lawn Tennis Club until 1915. In 1934 a nascent Northern Lawn Tennis Association of New Zealand was established (today its known as Tennis Northern) it organised the North Island Championships. The tournament was first played at the Lower Hutt Tennis Club (f.1927), Lower Hutt, Wellington Province, New Zealand. The event was part of ILTF Australasia Circuit (1934–72) a sub circuit of the ILTF World Open Circuit, then later the ILTF Oceania Circuit a regional circuit of the ILTF Independent Circuit from 1975 until 1978 when it was downgraded from the worldwide independent circuit it became a local regional event of Tennis New Zealand and is still held today.

The tournament was held in Nelson, but also other locations including,Hutt Valley, Hamilton, Lower Hutt, Palmerston North, Wellington and Whanganui.

The South Island equivalent to this tournament was the South Island Open Championships founded in 1934 by the Southern Lawn Tennis Association.

== Finals ==
=== Men's singles ===
(incomplete roll)

North Island Championships
Year	Location	Champions	Runners-up	Score
1934	Lower Hutt	(New Zealand) Cam Malfroy	(New Zealand) Jack Curtis Charters	6–2, 6–2, 6–2
1937	Lower Hutt	(New Zealand) Cam Malfroy (2)	(New Zealand) Buster Andrews	6–3, 6–4
1957	Wellington	(New Zealand) Jeff Robson	(New Zealand) Ron McKenzie	6-1, 5–7, 6-3
1958	Lower Hutt	(New Zealand) Jeff Robson (2)	(New Zealand) Ron McKenzie	6-3, 4–6, 7–5, 7-5
1959	Wellington	(United Kingdom) Billy Knight	(United Kingdom) Mike Davies	6-4, 2–6, 6–4, 6-2
1961	Wellington	(New Zealand) Richard Hawkes	(New Zealand) M Hussey	6-2, 6-2
1963	Hamilton	(New Zealand) Lew Gerrard	(New Zealand) Ian Crookenden	6-2, 6-3
1964	Whanganui	(New Zealand) Lew Gerrard (2)	(New Zealand) Jeff Robson	7-5, 6-0
1967	Lower Hutt	(United Kingdom) Mark Cox	(New Zealand) Brian Fairlie	6-2, 6-4
1968	Timuru	(New Zealand) Brian Fairlie	(New Zealand) Onny Parun	6–3, 6–4, 6–1
↓ Open Era ↓
1969	Hamilton	(Soviet Union) Toomas Leius	(New Zealand) Onny Parun	6-3, 6-4 5–7, 6-1
1970	Hutt Valley	(New Zealand) Onny Parun	(New Zealand) Richard Hawkes	6-1, 5–7, 7–9, 6–2, 6-3
1971	Palmerston North	(New Zealand) Onny Parun (2)	(Austria) Hans Kary	6-4, 7–5, 6-3
North Island Open Championships
1972	Hamilton	(United States) Armistead Neely	(United States) Steve Faulk	7-5, 6–3, 7-5
1973	Palmerston North	(Australia) Bob Rheinberger	(Sweden) Lars Olander	6–4, 6–3, 6–2
1978	Wellington	(Australia) Bob Carmichael	(Brazil) João Soares	2-6, 6–3, 7-5

=== Women's singles ===
(incomplete roll)

North Island Championships
Year	Location	Champions	Runners-up	Score
1932	Palmerston North	(New Zealand) Miss M. Whyte	(New Zealand) ?	?
1961	Lower Hutt	(New Zealand) Ruia Morrison	(Australia) M. Johnston	6–3, 6–2
1967	Lower Hutt	(New Zealand) Marilyn Headifen	(New Zealand) Beverley Vercoe	6–0, 6–2
↓ Open Era ↓
1969	Nelson	(New Zealand) Jennifer Goodall Nelson	(New Zealand) Lynn Harris	6–4, 6–4.
1970	Hutt Valley	(United States) Alice Tym	(New Zealand) Beverley Vercoe	6–2, 6–2
1971	Palmerston North	(New Zealand) Jill Fraser	(New Zealand) Beverley Vercoe	6–3, 5–7, 6–3
North Island Open Championships
1975	Hutt Valley	(United States) Ceci Martinez	(Belgium) Michèle Gurdal	6–3, 2–6, 6–3
