= Tennis at the 1924 Summer Olympics – Men's doubles =

Men's doubles at the Games of the VIII Olympiad
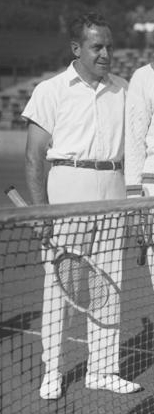
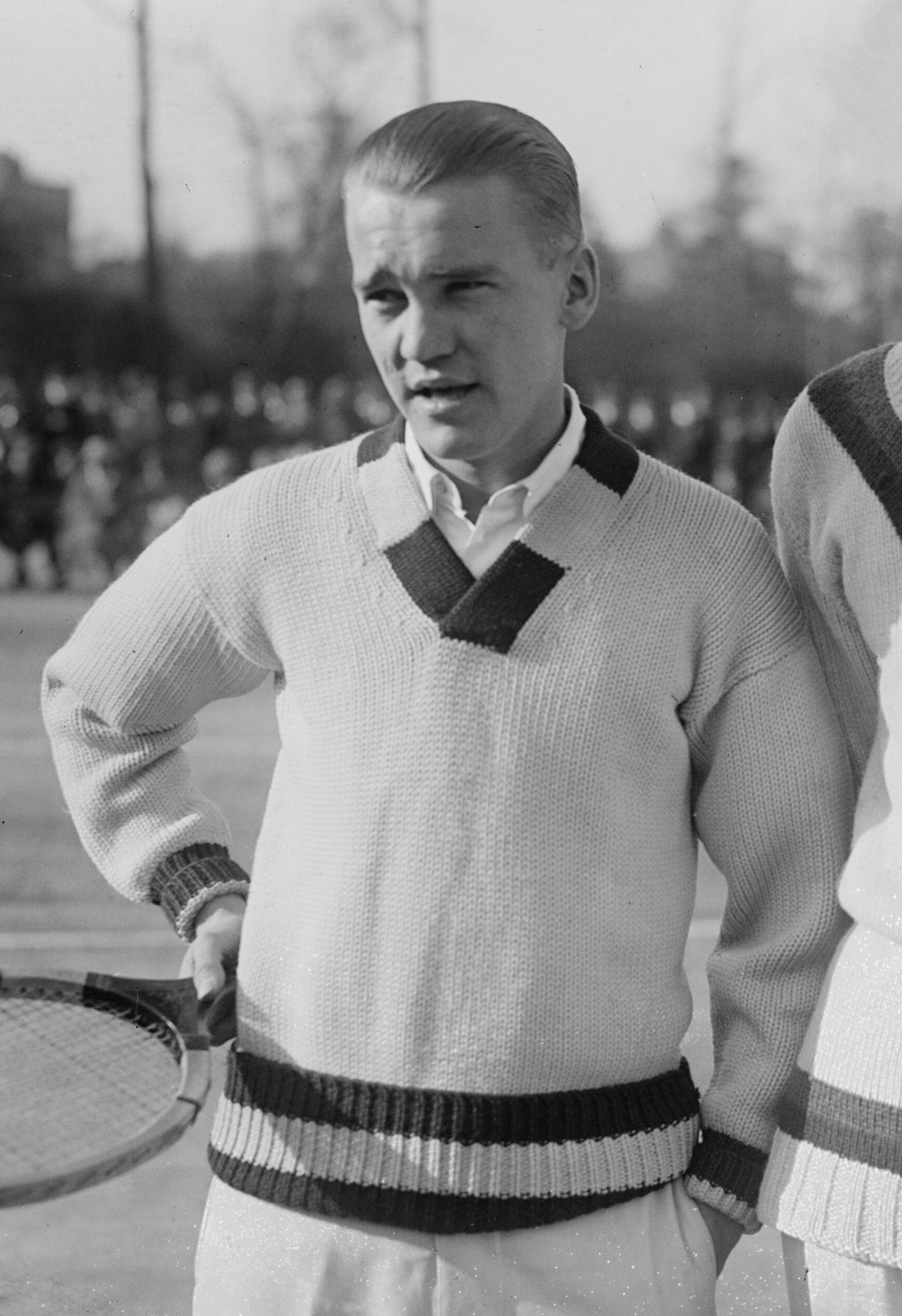
- Francis Hunter (1929) Vincent Richards (1922)
- Venue: Stade Olympique Yves-du-Manoir
- Dates: 14–21 July 1924
- Competitors: 38 teams (76 players) from 24 nations

Medalists
1st place, gold medalist(s)		Francis Hunter; Vincent Richards; United States
2nd place, silver medalist(s)		Jacques Brugnon; Henri Cochet; France
3rd place, bronze medalist(s)		Jean Borotra; René Lacoste; France

Men's doubles
- Tennis at the 1924 Summer Olympics

Events
Singles	men	women
Doubles	men	women	mixed
- Summer Olympics

The men's doubles tennis competition was one of five tennis events at the 1924 Summer Olympics. There were 76 players from 24 nations, forming 38 pairs. Nations were limited to two pairs (four players) each. The event was won by Americans Francis Hunter and Vincent Richards after five-set matches in both the semifinals and final against French pairs. It was the nation's second victory in the event, second-most behind Great Britain's three wins. Jacques Brugnon and Henri Cochet were the silver medalists, falling to the Americans in the final. Jean Borotra and René Lacoste had met Hunter and Richards in the semifinals, losing to them before winning the bronze-medal match against Jack Condon and Ivie Richardson of South Africa.

== Background ==
This was the seventh appearance of men's doubles tennis. The event has been held at every Summer Olympics where tennis has been on the program: from 1896 to 1924 and then from 1988 to the current program. A demonstration event was held in 1968.

The field for the 1924 doubles tournament was fairly strong by early Olympic standards. The American and French teams were particularly strong, with both pairs from an all-American final at Wimbledon earlier that year (Francis Hunter and Vincent Richards over Watson Washburn and R. Norris Williams) competing at the Games. The Four Musketeers made up the French contingent, with Jacques Brugnon and Henri Cochet one pair and Jean Borotra and René Lacoste the other.

Argentina, Chile, Finland, India, Ireland, Mexico, and Romania each made their debut in the event. Great Britain made its fifth appearance in the event, most of any nation.

== Competition format ==
The competition was a single-elimination tournament with a bronze-medal match. All matches were best-of-five sets. Tiebreaks had not been invented yet.

== Schedule ==
Date	Time	Round
Monday, 14 July 1924		Round of 64; Round of 32
Tuesday, 15 July 1924		Round of 32; Round of 16
Wednesday, 16 July 1924		Round of 32; Round of 16
Friday, 18 July 1924		Quarterfinals
Saturday, 19 July 1924		Semifinals
Monday, 21 July 1924		Bronze medal match Final

== Draw ==
=== Finals ===
Quarterfinals
Henning Müller (SWE); Charles Wennergren (SWE)	4	1	3
Jacques Brugnon (FRA); Henri Cochet (FRA)	6	6	6
Jack Condon (RSA); Ivie Richardson (RSA)	4	11	4	6	6
Watson Washburn (USA); R. Norris Williams (USA)	6	9	6	4	4
Francis Hunter (USA); Vincent Richards (USA)	6	6	6
José María Alonso (ESP); Manuel Alonso (ESP)	4	4	3
Syed Mohammad Hadi (IND); Donald Rutnam (IND)	2	2	3
Jean Borotra (FRA); René Lacoste (FRA)	6	6	6

Semifinals
Jacques Brugnon (FRA); Henri Cochet (FRA)	5	6	7	6
Jack Condon (RSA); Ivie Richardson (RSA)	7	3	5	2
Francis Hunter (USA); Vincent Richards (USA)	6	6	0	5	6
René Lacoste (FRA); Jean Borotra (FRA)	2	3	6	7	3

Final (gold-medal match)
Jacques Brugnon (FRA); Henri Cochet (FRA)	6	2	3	6	3
Vincent Richards (USA); Francis Hunter (USA)	4	6	6	2	6
Bronze-medal match
Jack Condon (RSA); Ivie Richardson (RSA)	3	8	3
Jean Borotra (FRA); René Lacoste (FRA)	6	10	6

=== Top half ===
==== Section 1 ====
First round

Second round
H Cattaruzza (ARG); J Williams (ARG)	2	0	3
H Müller (SWE); C Wennergren (SWE)	6	6	6
R Granholm (FIN); E Schildt (FIN)
S-K Ng (ROC); WL Wei (ROC)	w/o
H de Morpurgo (ITA); C Serventi (ITA)	6	6	7
V de Laveleye (BEL); J Washer (BEL)	4	4	5
I Balás (YUG); D Dunđerski (YUG)	w/o
J Brugnon (FRA); H Cochet (FRA)

Third round
H Müller (SWE); C Wennergren (SWE)	6	6	6
R Granholm (FIN); E Schildt (FIN)	3	1	4
H de Morpurgo (ITA); C Serventi (ITA)	2	4	2
J Brugnon (FRA); H Cochet (FRA)	6	6	6

Quarterfinals
H Müller (SWE); C Wennergren (SWE)	4	1	3
J Brugnon (FRA); H Cochet (FRA)	6	6	6

==== Section 2 ====
First round
D Torralva Ponsa (CHI); L Torralva Ponsa (CHI)	7	6	6
G Lupu (ROU); A Roman (ROU)	5	2	3
C van Lennep (NED); H Timmer (NED)	4	6	3	6	2
M Fukuda (JPN); A Honda (JPN)	6	1	6	1	6
A Casanovas (POR); R de Castro Pereira (POR)	w/o
E Flaquer (ESP); R Saprissa (ESP)
E Gottlieb (TCH); F Rohrer (TCH)	6	6	6
L Godfree (GBR); M Woosnam (GBR)	3	4	2
L Göncz (HUN); K Kirchmäyer (HUN)	1	0	0
W Washburn (USA); R Williams (USA)	6	6	6
S Jacob (IND); M Sleem (IND)	3	4	6	4
E Tegner (DEN); E Ulrich (DEN)	6	6	4	6
P Debran (SUI); H Syz (SUI)	4	6	6	1	6
W Ireland (IRL); E McCrea (IRL)	6	2	2	6	4

Second round
J Condon (RSA); I Richardson (RSA)	6	6	4	6
D Torralva Ponsa (CHI); L Torralva Ponsa (CHI)	2	1	6	2
M Fukuda (JPN); A Honda (JPN)	2	3	3
E Flaquer (ESP); R Saprissa (ESP)	6	6	6
E Gottlieb (TCH); F Rohrer (TCH)	3	2	1
W Washburn (USA); R Williams (USA)	6	6	6
E Tegner (DEN); E Ulrich (DEN)	3	6	6	6
P Debran (SUI); H Syz (SUI)	6	0	0	1

Third round
J Condon (RSA); I Richardson (RSA)	6	6	6
E Flaquer (ESP); R Saprissa (ESP)	2	3	1
W Washburn (USA); R Williams (USA)	6	6	12
E Tegner (DEN); E Ulrich (DEN)	4	4	10

Quarterfinals
J Condon (RSA); I Richardson (RSA)	4	11	4	6	6
W Washburn (USA); R Williams (USA)	6	9	6	4	4

=== Bottom half ===
==== Section 3 ====
First round
C Aeschlimann (SUI); M Ferrier (SUI)
L Raymond (RSA); P Spence (RSA)	w/o
M van der Feen (NED); G Leembruggen (NED)	3	2	3
J Koželuh (TCH); L Žemla (TCH)	6	6	6
B von Kehrling (HUN); A von Kelemen (HUN)	8	9	6	3	2
J Bayley (AUS); A Willard (AUS)	6	11	3	6	6
N Mișu (ROU); M Stern (ROU)	w/o
F Hunter (USA); V Richards (USA)	w/o
A Kingscote (GBR); J Wheatley (GBR)	4	3	1
JM Alonso (ESP); M Alonso (ESP)	6	6	6
E Bache (DEN); B Thalbitzer (DEN)	0	0	1
T Harada (JPN); S Okamoto (JPN)	6	6	6

Second round
C Aeschlimann (SUI); M Ferrier (SUI)	4	6	4	4
J Koželuh (TCH); L Žemla (TCH)	6	3	6	6
J Bayley (AUS); A Willard (AUS)	1	2	2
F Hunter (USA); V Richards (USA)	6	6	6
JM Alonso (ESP); M Alonso (ESP)	6	4	6	6
T Harada (JPN); S Okamoto (JPN)	4	6	4	4
F del Canto (MEX); M Lozano Alatorre (MEX)	2	3	6	2
P Papadopoulos (GRE); A Zerlendis (GRE)	6	6	4	6

Third round
J Koželuh (TCH); L Žemla (TCH)	2	3	4
F Hunter (USA); V Richards (USA)	6	6	6
JM Alonso (ESP); M Alonso (ESP)	6	9	6
P Papadopoulos (GRE); A Zerlendis (GRE)	2	7	4

Quarterfinals
F Hunter (USA); V Richards (USA)	6	6	6
JM Alonso (ESP); M Alonso (ESP)	4	4	3

==== Section 4 ====
First round

Second round
C Colombo (ITA); R Sabbadini (ITA)
H-H Khoo (ROC); S-C Wu (ROC)	w/o
C Langaard (NOR); J Nielsen (NOR)	2	3	0
SM Hadi (IND); D Rutnam (IND)	6	6	6
J Borotra (FRA); J Lacoste (FRA)	6	6	6
S Halot (BEL); A Lammens (BEL)	3	0	2
C Dumas (ARG); G Robson (ARG)	6	6	6
A Grahn (FIN); E Schybergson (FIN)	1	3	0

Third round
C Colombo (ITA); R Sabbadini (ITA)	w/o
SM Hadi (IND); D Rutnam (IND)
J Borotra (FRA); J Lacoste (FRA)	6	6	6
C Dumas (ARG); G Robson (ARG)	4	1	3

Quarterfinals
SM Hadi (IND); D Rutnam (IND)	2	2	3
J Borotra (FRA); J Lacoste (FRA)	6	6	6

== Sources ==
- ITF, 2008 Olympic Tennis Event Media Guide
- M. Avé, Comité Olympique Français (ed.). Les Jeux de la VIII^{e} Olympiade Paris 1924 – Rapport Officiel (PDF) (in French). Paris: Librairie de France. pp. 379–384. Archived (PDF) from the original on 5 May 2011.
