= South Island Open Championships =

Defunct tennis tournament
- Tour: ILTF
- Founded: 1934; 91 years ago
- Abolished: 1978; 47 years ago
- Location: Christchurch; Nelson; Timaru; Wānaka
- Venue: Various
- Surface: Grass (1934-75); Hard (1976-78)

The South Island Open Championships was a regional men's and women's grass court then later hard court tennis tournament founded in 1934 as the South Island Championships. The tournament was first played at the Nelson Lawn Tennis Club (f.1925), Nelson, Nelson Province, North Island, New Zealand. The tournament was played at other locations until 1978 when it was discontinued as part of the ILTF Independent Tour.

== History ==
This tournament has it origins in the Nelson Provincial Lawn Tennis Association Championships founded in 1899 that ran till 1910. In 1934 the Southern Lawn Tennis Association of New Zealand was established (today its known as Tennis Southern) it established the South Island Championships.

The tournament was first played at the Nelson Lawn Tennis Club (f.1925), Nelson, Nelson Province, New Zealand. The event was part of ILTF Australasia Circuit (1934–72) a sub circuit of the ILTF World Circuit, then later the ILTF Oceania Circuit a regional circuit of the ILTF Independent Tour from 1975 until 1978 when it was downgraded from the worldwide independent tour it became a local regional event of Tennis New Zealand and is still held today.

The tournament was held in Nelson, but also other locations including, Christchurch, Timaru and Wānaka.

The North Island equivalent to this tournament was the North Island Open Championships also founded in 1932 by the Northern Lawn Tennis Association of New Zealand.

== Finals ==
=== Men's singles ===
(incomplete roll)

South Island Championships
Year	Location	Champions	Runners-up	Score
1934	Nelson	(New Zealand) Cam Malfroy	(New Zealand) Buster Andrews	6–4, 6–4, 6–2
1937	Nelson	(New Zealand) Alan Stedman	(New Zealand) Buster Andrews	6–3, 6–4
1950	Nelson	(New Zealand) John Barry	(New Zealand) Ron McKenzie	6–3, 6–4, 6–3
1957	Nelson	(New Zealand) Jeff Robson	(New Zealand) Lew Gerrard	6–4, 6–1
1967	Nelson	(New Zealand) Onny Parun	(New Zealand) Richard Hawkes	10–8, 6–3, 7–5
1968	Timuru	(New Zealand) Brian Fairlie	(Rhodesia) Hank Irvine	6–3, 6–4, 6–1
↓ Open Era ↓
1969	Nelson	(New Zealand) Ryan McCutcheon	(New Zealand) Richard Harris	10–8, 6–4.
1970	Nelson	(New Zealand) Onny Parun (2)	(United States) Bill Tym	9–7, 5–7, 4–6, 6–2, 6–3
1971	Timuru	(Sweden) Lars Ölander	(New Zealand) Richard Hawkes	0–6, 7–5, 6–4, 6–2
South Island Open Championships
1972	Nelson	(New Zealand) Dave Simmonds	(United States) Bill Brown	3-6, 6–3, 1–6, 6–4 7–5
1973	Timuru	(Australia) Kim Warwick	(Australia) Syd Ball	6–4, 6–3, 6–2
1978	Wānaka	(Australia) Glen Busby	(New Zealand) Ken Wurtz	6–3, 6–1

=== Women's singles ===
(incomplete roll)

South Island Championships
Year	Location	Champions	Runners-up	Score
1958	Nelson	(New Zealand) Ruia Morrison	(New Zealand) Dawn Taylor	6–4, 6–8, 6–1
1960	Nelson	(New Zealand) Sonia Cox	(New Zealand) Heather Robson	8–6, 6–1
1962	Nelson	(New Zealand) Ruia Morrison (2)	(New Zealand) Ethne Mitchell	6–2, 6–1
1967	Nelson	(New Zealand) Ethne Mitchell	(New Zealand) Cecelie Fleming	6–2, 6–4
1968	Timuru	(United Kingdom) Winnie Shaw	(United Kingdom) Rita Bentley	6–3, 3–6, 6–2
↓ Open Era ↓
1969	Nelson	(New Zealand) Jennifer Goodall Nelson	(New Zealand) Lynn Harris	6–4, 6–4.
1970	Nelson	(United States) Alice Tym	(New Zealand) Beverley Vercoe	4–6, 6–2, 6–1
1971	Timuru	(United States) Kathleen Harter	(New Zealand) Sue Blakely	6–2, 6–4
South Island Open Championships
1976	Wānaka	(Australia) Karen Krantzcke	(Sweden) Helena Anliot	6–1, 3–6, 6–4
