= New Zealand Championships =

Defunct tennis tournament
- Tour: ILTF Circuit (1913–1968)
- Founded: 1885; 141 years ago
- Abolished: 2020; 6 years ago
- Location: Auckland; Christchurch; Dunedin; Hastings; Mount Eden; Miramar; Napier; Nelson; New Plymouth; Palmerston; Timaru; Wellington
- Venue: Various
- Surface: Grass/Hard

Current champions
- Men's singles: (New Zealand) Finn Tearney
- Women's singles: (New Zealand) Paige Hourigan

The New Zealand Championships was a combined men's and women's tennis tournament founded in 1885 in Napier, New Zealand also known as the New Zealand National Lawn Tennis Championships or the New Zealand Lawn Tennis Association Championships. The championships were organised by Tennis New Zealand, and played in various locations during its run that ended in 2020.

== History ==
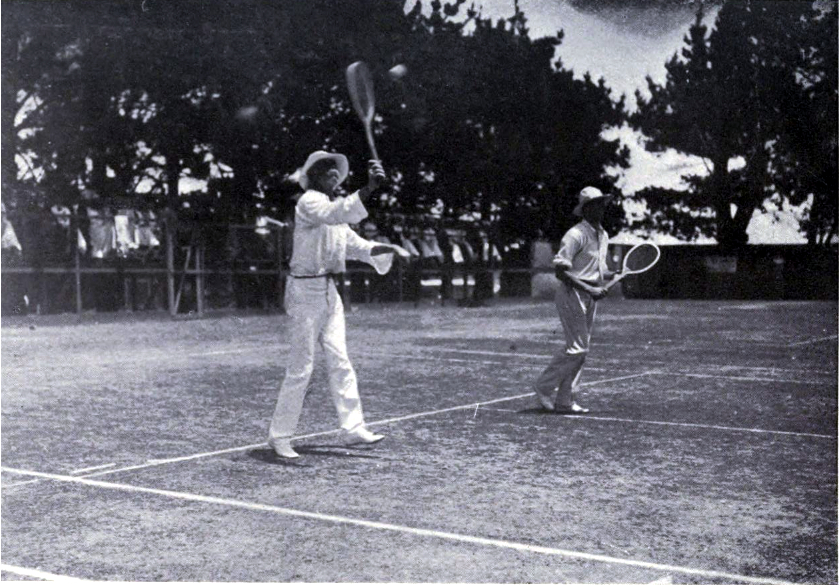
New Zealand player Anthony Wilding and his father, Frederick Wilding, playing at the New Zealand Championships (c. 1906–1909)

In December 1886, the first New Zealand Championships were held at Farndon Park, in the small town of Clive, near Napier. The championships were organised by the New Zealand Lawn Tennis Association, which was formed in Napier.

The championships were held in numerous locations throughout the course of their history. The championships were not held from 1915 to 1918 due to World War I and also from 1940 to 1945 during World War II. Although the majority of the winners of the event were from New Zealand, a number of players from overseas also won the title, including Grand Slam singles winners Bill Tilden, Fred Perry, Vivian McGrath and John Bromwich. New Zealand's multiple Grand Slam singles winner Anthony Wilding also won the New Zealand championships title. Before 1922 the Australasian championships were held in New Zealand on two occasions, but this was a separate tournament from the New Zealand championships. From 1922 onwards the Australasian Championships were no longer held at New Zealand or Perth and the event changed its name to the Australian Championships in 1927.

From 1973 to 1987 the event was sponsored by the oil company BP and was known as the BP New Zealand Championships. From 1988 the event was a New Zealand national event and continued to be held through till 2020 when it was discontinued. The tournament was played almost exclusively on grass courts from its inception until 1988 when it switched to hard courts.

The winner of the first men's singles title was Percival Fenwick, and the ladies singles was won by Sarah Lance. The final winner of the men's singles title was Finn Tearney and the women's singles was won by Paige Hourigan. The towns where the championships were held included Auckland, Christchurch, Dunedin, Hastings, Mount Eden, Miramar, Napier, Nelson, New Plymouth, Palmerston, Timaru and Wellington. From 1979 the event was held permanently in Wellington.

== Finals ==
=== Men's singles ===
(incomplete roll)

Year	Champion	Runner-up	Score
1886	(New Zealand) Percival Fenwick	(New Zealand) Eric Hudson	6-2, 6-0, 6-4
1887	(New Zealand) Percival Fenwick	(New Zealand) Richard Harman	6-4, 2-6, 4-6, 10-8, 6-2
1888	(New Zealand) Percival Fenwick	(New Zealand) Minden Fenwick	4-6, 4-6, 6-1, 6-4, 9-7
1889	(New Zealand) Minden Fenwick	(New Zealand) Joy Marshall	6-4, 0-6, 6-3, 6-3
1890	(New Zealand) Joy Marshall	(New Zealand) Minden Fenwick	6-3, 6-4, 10-8
1891	(New Zealand) Richard Harman	(New Zealand) Joy Marshall	6-4, 6-4, 10-8
1892	(New Zealand) Minden Fenwick	(New Zealand) Richard Harman	1-6, 7-5, 9-7, 3-6, 6-4
1893	(New Zealand) Minden Fenwick	(New Zealand) Patrick Marshall	1-6, 6-3, 6-4, 6-3
1894	(New Zealand) James Hooper	(New Zealand) Harry Parker	3-6, 6-1, 6-2, 6-1
1895	(New Zealand) Harry Parker	(New Zealand) James Hooper	6-4, 6-2, 6-5
1896	(New Zealand) Joy Marshall	(New Zealand) James Hooper	8-6, 6-2, 6-0
1897	(New Zealand) James Hooper	(New Zealand) Harry Parker	6-1, 8-6, 6-4
1898	(New Zealand) Cecil Cox	(New Zealand) John Collins	6-2, 4-6, 6-3, 6-3
1899	(New Zealand) James Hooper	(New Zealand) John Peacock	10-8, 6-3, 7-5
1900	(New Zealand) Alfred Dunlop	(New Zealand) John Peacock	4-6, 6-1, 6-2, 6-4
1901	(New Zealand) John Peacock	(New Zealand) Frederick Laishley	6-2, 6-4, 7-5
1902	(New Zealand) Harry Parker	(New Zealand) John Peacock	6-2, 6-2, 6-1
1903	(New Zealand) Harry Parker	(New Zealand) John Peacock	6-3, 6-2, 6-2
1904	(New Zealand) Harry Parker	(New Zealand) Andrew Borrows	6-1, 6-2, 6-1
1905	(New Zealand) Harry Parker	(New Zealand) Clifford Dickie	6-1, 6-0, 6-2
1906	(New Zealand) Anthony Wilding	(New Zealand) Harry Parker	6-4, 2-6, 6-3, 6-1
1907	(New Zealand) Harry Parker	(New Zealand) Thomas Quill	4-6, 6-0, 6-4, 6-3
1908	(New Zealand) Anthony Wilding	(New Zealand) Harry Parker	6-2, 6-1, 6-4
1909	(New Zealand) Anthony Wilding	(New Zealand) Frank Fisher	6-1, 6-1, 6-1
1910	(New Zealand) John Peacock	(New Zealand) Frank Fisher	6-1, 0-6, 6-1, 7-5
1911	(New Zealand) Geoff Ollivier	(New Zealand) John Peacock	6-2, 4-6, 6-1, 6-1
1912	(New Zealand) Robert Swanston	(New Zealand) Frank Fisher	2-6, 1-6, 6-2, 6-3, 6-1
1913	(New Zealand) Alexander Wallace	(New Zealand) Clifford Dickie	5-7, 6-2, 6-2 rtd.
1914	(New Zealand) Geoff Ollivier	(New Zealand) Lancelot Jennings	4-6, 6-4, 6-4, 6-1
1915-18	No competition		
1919	(New Zealand) Geoff Ollivier	(New Zealand) James Laurenson	6-2, 1-6, 6-0, 7-5
1920	(United States) Bill Tilden	(United States) Watson Washburn	6-0, 6-1, 4-6, 4-6, 6-3
1921	(New Zealand) James Laurenson	(New Zealand) Edgar Bartleet	6-2, 6-4, 6-4
1922	(New Zealand) Geoff Ollivier	(New Zealand) James Laurenson	6-4, 6-3, 7-5
1923	(New Zealand) Arthur Sims	(New Zealand) Geoff Ollivier	9-7, 6-3, 6-1
1924	(New Zealand) Geoff Ollivier	(New Zealand) James Laurenson	6-2, 6-0, 6-0
1925	(New Zealand) Geoff Ollivier	(New Zealand) Donald France	5-7, 6-4, 6-2, 6-1
1926	(New Zealand) Eskell 'Buster' Andrews	(Australia) Allan North	2-6, 4-6, 6-1, 6-0, 6-3
1927	(New Zealand) Geoff Ollivier	(New Zealand) Edgar Bartleet	6-1, 4-6, 6-3, 3-6, 9-7
1928	(New Zealand) Edgar Bartleet	(New Zealand) Cam Malfroy	4-6, 7-5, 8-6, 6-4
1929	(New Zealand) Charlie Angas	(New Zealand) Donald France	6-1, 3-6, 6-4, 6-1
1930	(New Zealand) Alan Stedman	(New Zealand) Harold Barnett	7-5, 6-1, 6-3
1931	(New Zealand) Charlie Angas	(New Zealand) Harold Barnett	5-7, 6-4, 6-4, 6-0
1932	(New Zealand) Eskell 'Buster' Andrews	(New Zealand) Cam Malfroy	6-0, 6-4, 2-6, 6-3
1933	(New Zealand) Cam Malfroy	(Australia) Clifford Sproule	4-6, 8-6, 6-3, 6-8, 6-3
1934	(United Kingdom) Fred Perry	(Australia) Abel Kay	6-2, 6-3, 6-2
1935	(Australia) Vivian McGrath	(New Zealand) Eskell 'Buster' Andrews	5-7, 10-8, 7-5, 6-0
1936	(New Zealand) Dennis Coombe	(New Zealand) Noel Bedford	6-3, 5-7, 6-4, 2-6, 6-1
1937	(New Zealand) Alistair Browne	(New Zealand) Robert Pattinson	6-0, 7-5, 6-1
1938	(New Zealand) Neil Edwards	(New Zealand) Harold Barnett	6-4, 6-1, 6-1
1939	(Australia) John Bromwich	(Australia) Jack Crawford	7-5, 6-3, 6-3
1940-45	No competition		
1946	(New Zealand) Ron McKenzie	(New Zealand) Stanley Painter	6-1, 6-1, 7-5
1947	(New Zealand) Ron McKenzie	(New Zealand) Leo Roach	6-2, 0-6, 6-1, 6-3
1948	(New Zealand) Ron McKenzie	(New Zealand) Jeff Robson	7-5, 6-2, 6-2
1949	(New Zealand) Jeff Robson	(New Zealand) Ron McKenzie	6-1, 3-6, 6-2, 6-4
1950	(Australia) George Worthington	(New Zealand) Jeff Robson	6-4, 6-3, 7-5
1951	(New Zealand) Ron McKenzie	(New Zealand) John Barry	6-2, 9-7, 6-4
1952	(New Zealand) Jeff Robson	(Australia) Bill Sidwell	1-6, 6-0, 4-6, 7-5, 6-1
1953	(Australia) George Worthington	(New Zealand) Jeff Robson	6-4, 6-4, 7-5
1954	(New Zealand) John Barry	(New Zealand) Mark Otway	8-6, 6-3, 6-3
1955	(New Zealand) John Barry	(New Zealand) Jeff Robson	6-4, 6-3, 6-2
1956	(New Zealand) Jeff Robson	(New Zealand) Ron McKenzie	5-7, 6-4, 4-6, 6-4, 7-5
1957	(United Kingdom) Mike Davies	(New Zealand) Jeff Robson	2-6, 10-8, 6-3, 6-4
1958	(Australia) Bob Howe	(New Zealand) Jeff Robson	1-6, 6-3, 6-3, 3-6, 7-5
1959	(Australia) Bob Howe	(New Zealand) John Barry	6-3, 2-6, 2-6, 6-0, 6-2
1960	(New Zealand) Lew Gerrard	(New Zealand) Mark Otway	6-1, 6-4, 6-4
1961	(New Zealand) Lew Gerrard	(New Zealand) Brian Woolf	6-1, 6-2 6-1
1962	(New Zealand) Lew Gerrard	(New Zealand) Ian Crookenden	8-6, 7-5, 6-1
1963	(New Zealand) Lew Gerrard	(New Zealand) Robert Clarke	6-2, 6-1, 6-2
1964	(New Zealand) Lew Gerrard	(United States) Gene Scott	3-6, 6-3, 6-1, 9-7
1965	(Australia) Barry Phillips-Moore	(New Zealand) Lew Gerrard	6-2, 3-6, 6-4, 6-3
1966	(Australia) Ken Fletcher	(United Kingdom) Roger Taylor	6-4, 5-7, 4-6, 6-0, 9-7
1967	(United Kingdom) Mark Cox	(New Zealand) Brian Fairlie	7-5, 6-0, 6-1
1968	(New Zealand) Brian Fairlie	(Australia) Colin Stubs	6-2, 6-3, 6-1
1969	(New Zealand) Brian Fairlie	(New Zealand) Onny Parun	6-4, 3-6, 6-3, 6-1
1970	(New Zealand) Onny Parun	(New Zealand) Richard Hawkes	6-1, 12-10, 6-4
1971	(Australia) Colin Dibley	(Australia) Bob Giltinan	6-1, 6-4, 6-4
1972	(New Zealand) Onny Parun	(United States) Steve Faulk	3-6, 7-6, 6-3, 7-6
1973	(Australia) Syd Ball	(Australia) Kim Warwick	6-2, 6-4, 4-6, 7-5
1974	(New Zealand) Onny Parun	(New Zealand) Russell Simpson	7-6, 6-4, 6-4
1975	(Austria) Gerhard Wimmer	(New Zealand) Russell Simpson	6-7, 6-2, 7-6, 6-4
1976	(New Zealand) Onny Parun	(New Zealand) Peter Langsford	7-5, 7-6, 7-6
1977	(New Zealand) Brian Fairlie	(Australia) Dale Collings	6-3, 6-4, 7-5
1978	(United States) Denis Gibson	(New Zealand) Peter Langsford	7-5, 6-4
1979	(United States) Larry Loeb	(New Zealand) David Mustard	6-2, 6-1
1980	(New Zealand) Mark Lewis	(New Zealand) Onny Parun	2-6, 6-3, 9-7
1981	(New Zealand) Onny Parun	(New Zealand) Bruce Derlin	6-3, 6-2
1982	(New Zealand) Onny Parun	(United States) Rand Evett	7-5, 6-2
1983	(Australia) John McCurdy	(New Zealand) David Mustard	7-6, 6-4
1984	(New Zealand) David Mustard	(New Zealand) Steve Guy	7-6, 6-4
1985	(New Zealand) Kelly Evernden	(New Zealand) David Lewis	7-6, 6-4
1986	(New Zealand) Kelly Evernden	(New Zealand) James Dunphy	
1987	(New Zealand) Kelly Evernden	(New Zealand) Bruce Derlin	6-3, 6-4

=== Women's Singles ===
Year	Location	Champion	Runner-up	Score
1887	Napier	(New Zealand) Sarah Lance	(New Zealand) Hilda Hitchings	6–2, 3–6, 6–1
1888	Christchurch	(New Zealand) Eveleen Harman	(New Zealand) Ruth Orbell	6–4, 7–9, 6–1
1889	Napier	(New Zealand) Emma Gordon	(New Zealand) Hilda Hitchings	6–4, 9–7
1890	Dunedin	(New Zealand) Emma Gordon (2)	(New Zealand) Ruth Orbell	7–5, 7–5
1891	Christchurch	(New Zealand) Isabel Rees	(New Zealand) Emma Gordon	6–3, 4–6, 6–5
1892	Napier	(New Zealand) Nina Douslin	(New Zealand) Constance Abraham	3–6, 6–3, 7–5
1893	Dunedin	(New Zealand) Isabel Rees (2)	(New Zealand) Ruth Orbell	6–4, 6–5
1894	Mount Eden, Auckland	(New Zealand) Mary Spiers	(New Zealand) A. Nicholson	6–3, 7–5
1895	Christchurch	(New Zealand) Hilda Hitchings	(Australia) Amy Meeson	6–3, 6–4
1896	Wellington	(New Zealand) Kate Nunneley	(New Zealand) Constance Lean	6–1, 6–1
1897	Nelson	(New Zealand) Kate Nunneley (2)	(New Zealand) M. Kennedy	6–1, 6–0
1898	Auckland	(New Zealand) Kate Nunneley (3)	(New Zealand) M. Kennedy	6–1, 6–0
1899	Dunedin	(New Zealand) Kate Nunneley (4)	(New Zealand) Constance Lean	6–1, 6–0
1900	Palmerston	(New Zealand) Kate Nunneley (5)	(New Zealand) Margaret Simpson	6–2, 6–1
1901	Christchurch	(New Zealand) Kate Nunneley (6)	(New Zealand) Margaret Simpson	6–0, 6–3
1902	Auckland	(New Zealand) Kate Nunneley (7)	(New Zealand) A. Nicholson	6–1, 6–0
1903	Nelson	(New Zealand) Kate Nunneley (8)	(New Zealand) Olive Gore	6–3, 6–1
1904	Napier	(New Zealand) Kate Nunneley (9)	(New Zealand) Olive Gore	6–2, 6–4
1905	Dunedin	(New Zealand) Kate Nunneley (10)	(New Zealand) Flora Campbell	6–0, 6–3
1906	Wellington	(New Zealand) Kate Nunneley (11)	(New Zealand) Lucy Powdrell	6–3, 6–2
1907	Christchurch	(New Zealand) Kate Nunneley (12)	(Australia) Annie Baker	6–2, 6–0
1908	New Plymouth	(New Zealand) Kate Nunneley (13)	(New Zealand) Lucy Powdrell	6–4, 6–4
1909	Nelson	(New Zealand) Lucy Powdrell	(New Zealand) Kate Nunneley	8–6, 6–3
1910	Auckland	(New Zealand) Lucy Powdrell (2)	(New Zealand) Kate Nunneley	6–2, 6–2
1911	Blenheim	(New Zealand) Eva Travers	(New Zealand) Ruby Wellwood	6–2, 6–1
1912	Christchurch	(Australia) Pearl Stewart	(New Zealand) Annie Gray	6–4, 8–6
1913	Hastings	(New Zealand) Annie Gray	(New Zealand) Constance Hartgill	2–6, 6–4, 6–3
1914	Auckland	(New Zealand) Annie Gray (2)	(New Zealand) Eva Baird	6–2, 8–6
1915	Dunedin	(New Zealand) Annie Gray (3)	(New Zealand) Eva Baird	4–6, 6–3, 6–4
1916–19	Not held due to World War I			
1920	Auckland	(New Zealand) Eva Baird	(New Zealand) Marjorie Macfarlane	6–1, 6–1
1921	Auckland	(New Zealand) Nancy Curtis	(New Zealand) Beryl Knight	7–5, 6–0
1922	Christchurch	(New Zealand) Nancy Curtis (2)	(New Zealand) Marjorie Macfarlane	—
1923	Hastings	(Australia) Sylvia Lance	(Australia) Nellie Lascelles	6–2, 6–0
1924	Christchurch	(New Zealand) May Spiers	(New Zealand) Jean McLaren	6–0, 8–6
1925	Auckland	(New Zealand) Myrtle Melody	(New Zealand) Marjorie Macfarlane	6–3, 3–6, 7–5
1926	Christchurch	(New Zealand) May Spiers (2)	(New Zealand) Jean Scott	—
1927	Auckland	(New Zealand) Arita Howe	(New Zealand) May Spiers	6–3, 6–3
1928	Christchurch	(New Zealand) May Spiers (3)	(New Zealand) Beryl Knight	6–1, 6–2
1929	Auckland	(New Zealand) Marjorie Macfarlane	(New Zealand) May Spiers	6–1, 3–6, 6–4
1930	Miramar	(New Zealand) Dulcie Nicholls	(New Zealand) Myrtle Melody	6–3, 6–1
1931	Christchurch	(New Zealand) May Spiers (4)	(New Zealand) Marjorie Macfarlane	6–1, 9–7
1932	Auckland	(Australia) Joan Hartigan	(Australia) Mall Molesworth	6–2, 6–4
1933	Miramar	(New Zealand) Dulcie Nicholls (2)	(New Zealand) Marjorie Macfarlane	6–4, 6–8, 6–3
1934	Wellington	(Australia) Louie Bickerton	(Australia) Ula Valkenburg	6–3, 1–6, 6–3
1935	Auckland	(New Zealand) Dulcie Nicholls (3)	(New Zealand) Marjorie Macfarlane	6–4, 6–3
1936	Wellington	(New Zealand) Dulcie Nicholls (4)	(New Zealand) Nessie Beverley	2–6, 6–4, 6–4
1937	Timaru	(New Zealand) Dulcie Nicholls (5)	(New Zealand) Nessie Beverley	6–3, 6–4
1938	Wellington	(New Zealand) Margaret Beverley	(New Zealand) Dora Miller	6–2, 8–6
1939	Christchurch	(Australia) May Hardcastle	(Australia) Thelma Rice	6–2, 6–2
1940	Wellington	(Australia) Nancye Wynne	(Australia) Thelma Coyne	6–4, 6–1
1941–45	Not held due to World War II			
1946	Auckland	(New Zealand) Margaret Beverley (2)	(New Zealand) Janette Robb	7–5, 8–6
1947	Christchurch	(New Zealand) Margaret Beverley (3)	(New Zealand) Evelyn Attwood	7–5, 6–2
1948	Auckland	(New Zealand) Evelyn Attwood	(New Zealand) Mavis Kerr	6–2, 8–6
1949	Wellington	(New Zealand) Jessie McVay	(New Zealand) Mavis Kerr	6–2, 6–3
1950	Christchurch	(New Zealand) Margaret Beverley (4)	(New Zealand) Evelyn Attwood	4–6, 6–0, 6–4
1951	Auckland	(New Zealand) Judy Burke	(New Zealand) Jean MacGibbon	6–2, 6–3
1952	Wellington	(New Zealand) Jean MacGibbon	(New Zealand) Judy Burke	6–4, 6–4
1953	Christchurch	(New Zealand) Judy Burke (2)	(New Zealand) Heather Redwood	6–1, 7–5
1954	Auckland	(New Zealand) Judy Burke (3)	(New Zealand) Pat Nettleton	6–2, 6–4
1955	Wellington	(New Zealand) Judy Burke (4)	(New Zealand) Heather Redwood	6–2, 6–0
1956	Christchurch	(New Zealand) Sonia Cox	(New Zealand) Ruia Morrison	6–3, 3–6, 7–5
1957	Auckland	(New Zealand) Ruia Morrison	(New Zealand) Pat Nettleton	—
1958	Wellington	(New Zealand) Sonia Cox (2)	(New Zealand) Ruia Morrison	6–3, 6–2
1959	Christchurch	(New Zealand) Ruia Morrison (2)	(New Zealand) Sonia Cox	6–3, 6–3
1960	Auckland	(New Zealand) Ruia Morrison (3)	(Australia) Margaret Smith	6–4, 6–1
1961	Wellington	(New Zealand) Ruia Morrison (4)	(New Zealand) Anne Smith	6–4, 6–4
1962	Christchurch	(New Zealand) Judy Davidson	(New Zealand) Patsy Belton	6–3, 6–4
1963	Auckland	(New Zealand) Ruia Morrison (5)	(New Zealand) Judy Davidson	6–2, 3–6, 6–4
1964	Wellington	(United Kingdom) Rita Bentley	(New Zealand) Judy Davidson	3–6, 10–8, 6–4
1965	Christchurch	(New Zealand) Ruia Morrison (6)	(United Kingdom) Rita Bentley	5–7, 6–2, 6–1
1966	Auckland	(Australia) Kerry Melville	(New Zealand) Elizabeth Terry	6–2, 6–3
1967	Auckland	(New Zealand) Beverley Vercoe	(New Zealand) Ethne Mitchell	6–4, 5–7, 8–6
1968	Auckland	(New Zealand) Marilyn Pryde	(New Zealand) Patsy Stevens	6–0, 6–8, 6–2
1969	Auckland	(New Zealand) Beverley Vercoe (2)	(New Zealand) Shirley Collins	6–2, 6–3
1970	Wellington	(New Zealand) Marilyn Pryde (2)	(New Zealand) Robyn Hunt	8–6, 6–1
1971	Christchurch	(Australia) Evonne Goolagong	(Netherlands) Betty Stöve	6–1, 6–4
1972	Wellington	(United States) Mona Schallau	(New Zealand) Marilyn Pryde	6–2, 6–0
1973	Christchurch	(Australia) Evonne Goolagong (2)	(Australia) Janet Young	7–6, 6–2
1974	Auckland	(New Zealand) Robyn Hunt	(New Zealand) Marilyn Pryde	walkover
1975	Wellington	(United Kingdom) Sue Mappin	(United Kingdom) Lesley Charles	6–4, 6–4
1976	Christchurch	(New Zealand) Judith Connor	(New Zealand) Pauline Elliott	7–5, 1–6, 6–4
1977	Wellington	(New Zealand) Judith Connor (2)	(New Zealand) Gwen Stirton	6–4, 6–4
1978	Auckland	(New Zealand) Marilyn Tesch	(New Zealand) Chris Newton	—
1979	Wellington	(Australia) Pam Whytcross	(New Zealand) Brenda Perry	6–3, 7–5
1980	Wellington	(New Zealand) Brenda Perry	(New Zealand) Chris Newton	—
1981	Wellington	(New Zealand) Chris Newton	(New Zealand) Sally Chapman	—
1982	Auckland	(Belgium) Susan Hagey	(New Zealand) Belinda Cordwell	6–4, 6–2
1983	Wellington	(New Zealand) Brenda Perry (2)	(New Zealand) Linda Stewart	6–4, 6–2
1984	Wellington	(New Zealand) Linda Stewart	—	—
1985	Wellington	(New Zealand) Brenda Perry (3)	(New Zealand) Belinda Cordwell	7–5, 5–7, 7–6
1986	Wellington	(New Zealand) Belinda Cordwell	—	—
1987	Wellington	(New Zealand) Belinda Cordwell (2)	—	—
1988	Wellington	(Canada) Jill Hetherington	(United States) Katrina Adams	6–1, 6–1
1989	Wellington	(Spain) Conchita Martínez	(Australia) Jo-Anne Faull	6–1, 6–2
1990	Wellington	(Germany) Wiltrud Probst	(Soviet Union) Leila Meskhi	1–6, 6–4, 6–0
1991	Wellington	(Soviet Union) Leila Meskhi	(Czechoslovakia) Andrea Strnadová	3–6, 7–6, 6–2
1992	Wellington	(France) Noëlle van Lottum	(United States) Donna Faber	6–4, 6–0

== Event names ==
The event was first known as the New Zealand National Lawn Tennis Championships or the New Zealand Lawn Tennis Association Championships. It was later shortened to just New Zealand Championships and historically sometimes referred to as the New Zealand Senior Championships. From 1973 to 1987 the tournament was sponsored by the oil company BP and was branded as the BP New Zealand Championships.

From 1988 to 1992 the BP National Championships was another separate Grand Prix/ATP level event and from 1993–95 was part of the challenger circuit. The New Zealand national championships no longer had BP sponsorship from 1988 and was a national event won by New Zealand players only.

== See also ==
- BP National Championships
- ATP Auckland Open
- WTA Auckland Open
- Category:National and multi-national tennis tournaments

== Notes ==
This event should not be confused with the New Zealand Open Championships event that was first played in Auckland in 1969 and exclusively in that city until 1979 that was a combined event until 1981, and is directly descended from the both ATP Auckland Open and WTA Auckland Open. This tournament for all of its history was regarded as a national championships, and should not be confused with the men's BP National Championships tournament that was titled as such from 1988 to 1992 was also a different roll of winners.
