= Geoff Ollivier =

New Zealand tennis player

- Full name: Geoffrey Morton Ollivier
- Country (sports): NZL
- Born: August 19, 1886
- Died: October 10, 1960 (Age 74) Christchurch, New Zealand
- Retired: 1929

Singles
- Career titles: 14

Grand Slam singles results
- Australian Open: QF (1912)

Geoff Ollivier (August 19, 1886 – October 10, 1960) was a New Zealand tennis player in the years before and after World War 1.

== Career ==
Ollivier was the top New Zealand player for many years. "During a greater part of his reign he was so far ahead of his contemporaries in New Zealand he seemed to win just as he liked and whenever he liked, usually without much preparation", according to his obituary in Christchurch newspaper The Press. The article goes on to say "although in his younger days he was an all-court player, with his net attack an outstanding feature of his play, in later years he developed the chess-board type of game to a very fine art. Even against New Zealand's best players he seemed to make them run all over the court while doing very little running himself".

In the semi final of the 1911 New Zealand Championships, Ollivier beat future Australasian champion Arthur O'Hara Wood in the semi finals. Ollivier "proved to be at the very top of his form, and took three sets in brilliant fashion. The winner's service was irresistible, he made the ball jump and break in a very puzzling manner, and Wood could do little with it". He overcame John Peacock in the final in four sets. In 1914 he took his second New Zealand championships title beating Lancelot Jennings in the final in four sets. In 1919, Ollivier took his third title beating James Laurenson in the final in four sets. He won his fourth title in 1922, after playing indifferently throughout most of the tournament, beating Laurenson in straight sets in the final. Making one of his infrequent visits to Australia in 1923, Ollivier beat former Australasian champion Rice Gemmell in straight sets in the quarter finals of the City of Sydney championships with "delicate passing strokes and fine volleying". He lost the final in straight sets to reigning Australasian champion James Anderson. Ollivier beat Laurenson again in the final of the New Zealand championships in 1924, this time losing two games in three sets. In 1925, Ollivier won his sixth title, beating Donald France in four sets in the final. Ollivier "kept France moving and was able to force him into a greater number of errors owing to superior court-craft". He won his seventh and last title in 1927 winning 9–7 in the fifth set against Edgar Bartleet. Ollivier had been two points from defeat. "When the game was varied, and court-craft played an important part, it was Olliver who most often scored the winning shot- the subtle winner that made the galleries laugh...if there was not as much net play as some of the spectators would have liked, it was because the players rightly judged it was too risky. Such hard-hitting baseline experts, able to lob to a hair's breadth, were not likely to make a tactical blunder". Even in his last year of play in 1928, by now aged 42, he beat British player Colin Gregory (who won the Australian championships soon afterwards).
