= Jorge Williams =

Argentine tennis player

Personal information
- Full name: Jorge Daniel Williams Camet
- Born: 7 August 1904; Buenos Aires, Argentina
- Died: 14 February 1954 (aged 49)

Sport
- Sport: Tennis

Jorge Williams (7 August 1904 – 14 February 1954) was an Argentine tennis player. He competed in the men's doubles event at the 1924 Summer Olympics.
