= 1912 Australasian Championships – Singles =

Singles
- 1912 Australasian Championships

Final
- Champion: (United Kingdom) James Cecil Parke
- Runner-up: (United Kingdom) Alfred Beamish
- Score: 3–6, 6–3, 1–6, 6–1, 7–5

Details
- Draw: 12

Events
Singles	Doubles
- Australasian Championships

James Cecil Parke won in the final 3–6, 6–3, 1–6, 6–1, 7–5, against Alfred Beamish to win the men's singles tennis title at the 1912 Australasian Championships.

Norman Brookes was the defending champion, but chose not to participate that year.

== Draw ==
Key

- Q = Qualifier
- WC = Wild card
- LL = Lucky loser
- Alt = Alternate
- ITF = ITF entry
- PR = Protected ranking
- SR = Special ranking
- SE = Special exempt
- JE = Junior exempt
- JR = Junior Accelerator Programme entrant
- CO = College Accelerator Programme entrant
- NG = Next Gen Accelerator Program entrant
- w/o = Walkover
- r = Retired
- d = Defaulted

=== Draw ===
First round
(United Kingdom) JC Parke	4	2	6	6	6
(United Kingdom) A Lowe	6	6	1	0	4
(New Zealand) G Ollivier	6	6	6
(New Zealand) J Peacock	0	3	3
(United Kingdom) C Dixon	7	6	13
(New Zealand) W Goss	5	2	11
(United Kingdom) A Beamish	6	6	7
(New Zealand) F Fisher	5	1	5

Quarterfinals
(United Kingdom) JC Parke	6	6	8
(New Zealand) G Ollivier	4	1	6
(New Zealand) R Swanston	6	6	6
(New Zealand) W Pearce	2	1	2
(New Zealand) H Brown	6	6	6
(New Zealand) R D Harman	4	1	3
(United Kingdom) C Dixon	6	6	2	5	1
(United Kingdom) A Beamish	4	3	6	7	6

Semifinals
(United Kingdom) JC Parke	6	6	6
(New Zealand) R Swanston	2	2	3
(New Zealand) H Brown	1	1	2
(United Kingdom) A Beamish	6	6	6

Final
(United Kingdom) JC Parke	3	6	1	6	7
(United Kingdom) A Beamish	6	3	6	1	5

Preceded by 1911 U.S. National Championships	Grand Slam men's singles	Succeeded by 1912 Wimbledon Championships
