= Nicholas Lezard =

English journalist (born 1963)

- Born: 1963 (age 62–63)
- Education: Trinity College, Cambridge
- Occupations: Journalist, author and literary critic
- Relatives: Julien Lezard (great-uncle)

Nicholas Andrew Selwyn Lezard (born 1963) is an English journalist, author and literary critic.

He won the Jack Trevor Story Memorial Cup for 2015.

== Background and education ==
Nicholas Lezard's great-uncle Julian Lezard (1902–1958) was a barrister and society figure, who served in the Special Operations Executive. Julian Lezard married Hilda Cooper.

Lezard was educated at The Hall School, Hampstead, Westminster School, and Trinity College, Cambridge (BA 1984, MA 1990).

== Career ==
Lezard was literary editor of Modern Review, which appeared from 1991 to 1995 and again briefly in 1997. From 2007 to 2017, he had a weekly column, "Nicholas Lezard's choice", reviewing paperback books for The Guardian. He also writes for The Independent.

He formerly wrote the "Slack Dad" column for the Guardian, about his life as a parent. Later he started the "Down and Out" column, about his life after his marriage ended, for the New Statesman, which has resulted in three collections of memoir, starting with Bitter Experience Has Taught Me in 2013. Two more volumes of memoir have subsequently appeared.

His book The Nolympics: One Man's Struggle Against Sporting Hysteria was published in 2012 by Penguin Books.

Lezard was awarded the Jack Trevor Story Memorial Cup for 2015.

In 2018 Lezard was a judge for the Goldsmiths Prize, alongside Adam Mars-Jones, Elif Shafak and Deborah Levy.

== Reception ==
Nicholas Clee, reviewing Bitter Experience Has Taught Me in The Guardian, writes that the book is an adaptation of Lezard's New Statesman column, "done with such a light touch as to be almost unnoticeable." Clee finds Lezard's writing funny, entertaining, and companionable. Leyla Sanai, in The Independent, calls the book a "mild-mannered comedy of errors" in the P. G. Wodehouse mould, with Lezard mixing "self deprecation with [a] spirit of irreverence"; she finds the book "hilarious".

Alexander Larman writes that It Gets Worse is Lezard's second collection of witty New Statesman columns, which he finds "hugely entertaining". In his view, Lezard's "compassionate decency shines through", making the book an excellent Christmas present.

== Books ==
- The Nolympics: One Man's Struggle Against Sporting Hysteria. Penguin, 2012. ISBN 978-0718197629
- Bitter Experience Has Taught Me. Faber & Faber, 2013. ISBN 978-0571299164
- It Gets Worse: Adventures in Love, Loss and Penury. Salt Publishing, 2019. ISBN 978-1784632106
- From The Castle to the Hove-l. Salt Publishing, 2025. ISBN 978-1784633516
