= Syed Ali Akbar =

Syed Ali Akbar (1890 in Jaunpur, North-west Provinces, India – ?) was the son of Captain Syed Mohammed, commander of the Paigah army in Hyderabad State and brother of Olympic tennis player Syed Mohammed Hadi. He was born in Hyderabad on 16 October 1890 and got his primary and secondary education from Madrasa Aliya. After completing his matriculation he moved to Bombay and completed his intermediate from Wilson College. In 1912 when he was in the final year of his B.A., the Nizam's government approved his scholarship by the State government to study in England. From 1912 to 1916, he read history, political science, and economics at Peterhouse, Cambridge. Immediately after completing his M.A Cantab (Tripos) in Economics, he returned to Hyderabad.

== Working life ==
In 1916, he joined government service as Reader of history & economics at Nizam College. In 1917, he was offered a job in the Education Department of Hyderabad State as Divisional Inspector of School by the Director of Education Sir Ross Masood. He served in the Education Department between 1918 and 1947 as Divisional Inspector of Schools, Deputy Director Education, Principal Nizam College and as Director Education. During his tenure, he also represented Hyderabad State in the Imperial Education Conference held London in 1927 and later visited Germany and published (1930s) the book The German School System. He retired as Director of Education in 1947.

In 1948 soon after the fall of Hyderabad State, the new Governor of Hyderabad, Major-General J.N. Choudhary, nominated him on an Enquiry Committee of three members to investigate into the atrocities committed against Muslims during police action in various districts of the State. Syed Ali Akbar worked on this committee for seven months and submitted a comprehensive report to the Governor.

He was appointed as principal of the first Evening College in India in 1949 which he served till 1953. He later took over as the Honorary Principal of the newly established Anwar-ul-ulum College mainly to cater to the education requirements of the poor Muslim students. Syed Ali Akbar served the college for over 15 years and was instrumental in raising it from a Junior Intermediate College with few dozen students to a degree college for both Arts and Science subjects with over 1,000 students. With the help of his friends and grants from the state of government, he was able to undertake construction of suitable building for housing the expanding requirements of the college.

After retiring as Principal of Anwar-ul-ulum College, Syed Ali Akbar continued to remain active and busy in literary pursuits. He was the chief editor of the well-known English language quarterly Islamic Culture and President of Idara Adabiat Urdu which published monthly magazine Sub Rus for 20 years. He also served as chairman of Sugra Humayun Mirza Wafq & Safdaria Higher School committee until his death. He was a member of Osmania University Senate for several years.

Syed Ali Akbar was respected and admired by his colleagues, friends, subordinates, and relations alike. He had a large circle of distinguished personalities as his friends - like Khwaja Nazimuddin Shahid Saharwardi, Syed Mohammed Azam, Saeed Jung, Sir Prakash were his colleagues & friends in Cambridge. He had also close friendship with Sir Ross Masood, Sir Salar Jung III, and Sir Mirza Ismail. Mir Osman Ali Khan the Nizam had also great regard and respect for him.

Syed Ali Akbar's contribution in the establishment of a sound education system in Hyderabad State is still remembered and acknowledged. It was due to his pioneering and untiring efforts that the foundation of primary and secondary education was laid in Hyderabad. Because of his initiative and efforts vocational schools were established in the state both for boys and girls. As principal of Nizam College, Evening College and as first principal of Anwar-ul-ulum College, he made valuable contributions in improving the standard of education at the college level. He also helped in improving the standard of education at the university level as an active member of the Osmania University Senate.

== Publication ==
Syed Ali Akbar was the author of the classic book The German School System originally published in the 1930s which has been republished (in November 2006) by Hesperides Press (ISBN 978-1406735918).

He has been referenced in the books Locating Home: India's Hyderabadis Abroad by Karen Isaksen Leonard, published by Stanford University Press (2007) and by E. M. Forster in his classic book A Passage To India published by Penguin Classics.
