= Lilian Scharman =

American tennis player

- Full name: Lilian Scharman Hester
- Country (sports): United States
- Born: June 26, 1901 New York, United States
- Died: March 1, 1982 (aged 80) New York, United States
- Height: 5 ft 8.5 in (1.74 m)

Singles

Grand Slam singles results
- Wimbledon: 1R (1924)
- US Open: 3R (1928)

Doubles

Grand Slam doubles results
- Wimbledon: 2R (1924)
- US Open: SF (1923)

Grand Slam mixed doubles results
- Wimbledon: QF (1924)
- US Open: QF (1923)

Lilian Scharman Hester (née Scharman; June 26, 1901 – March 1, 1982) was an American tennis player who was active in the first half of the 1920s.

== Career ==
She lost to Helen Wills in the first round of Wimbledon in 1924 and competed in the 1924 Summer Olympics. Having beaten JF Park and Norah Middleton, Scharman and Francis Hunter reached the quarterfinal of the Wimbledon mixed doubles event which they lost to Dorothy Shepherd-Barron and Leslie Godfree.

At the 1923 U.S. Women's Clay Court Championships she lost the final of the singles event to Mayme McDonald in three sets. In June 1923 at the New Jersey State Championships, played on clay courts at the Orange Lawn Tennis Club, she won the singles title as well as the doubles title, partnering Ceres Baker. Scharman was a runner-up at the 1924 U.S. Indoor Championships, played at Longwood, Chestnut Hill, losing the final in straight sets to Marion Zinderstein Jessup.

She had a highest national ranking of No.4 in 1923.

== Personal life ==
She was born in Brooklyn, New York on June 26, 1901, the daughter of August Charles Scharman, a businessman, (Note: In 1924 he was vice-president of the German Savings Bank and director of the Manufacturers Trust Company.) and Lillie Rueger Scharman. Her younger sister Frida (1907–1997) played competitive tennis and squash. In 1921 she graduated from Packer Collegiate Institute. On August 6, 1923, she married William Van Andem Hester jr. in Paris.
