= Julian Lezard =

South African tennis player (1902–1958)

- Full name: Julian Joseph Lezard
- Country (sports): South Africa
- Born: 14 February 1902 Kimberley, South Africa
- Died: 31 August 1958 (aged 56) Great Missenden, Buckinghamshire

Singles

Grand Slam singles results
- Wimbledon: 1R (1922, 1924)

Doubles

Grand Slam doubles results
- Wimbledon: 3R (1925)

Grand Slam mixed doubles results
- Wimbledon: 2R (1924, 1925, 1926)

Julian Joseph "Lizzie" Lezard (14 February 1902 – 31 August 1958) was a South African tennis player.

Lezard, the eldest son of a solicitor, came from Kimberley, South Africa, and was educated at Cambridge University.

Active in tennis during the 1920s, Lezard featured in seven editions of the Wimbledon Championships. In 1926 he represented the South Africa Davis Cup team in ties against Portugal and Sweden.

Lezard, married in 1929, was the fourth husband of Hilda Cooper. They divorced in 1945. Her son from a previous marriage was Dan Ranfurly (6th Earl of Ranfurly), who was Governor of the Bahamas in the 1950s.

In World War II, Lezard worked for British Intelligence under the codename Église. He took part in a two-man Special Operations Executive mission (with Xan Fielding) near Seyne, France, in 1944. After being parachuted down over the Basses Alpes, he had a bad landing and suffered two fractured vertebrae.

Lezard was the great-uncle of journalist Nicholas Lezard.

== See also ==
- List of South Africa Davis Cup team representatives
