= Patrick Wheatley =

English tennis player

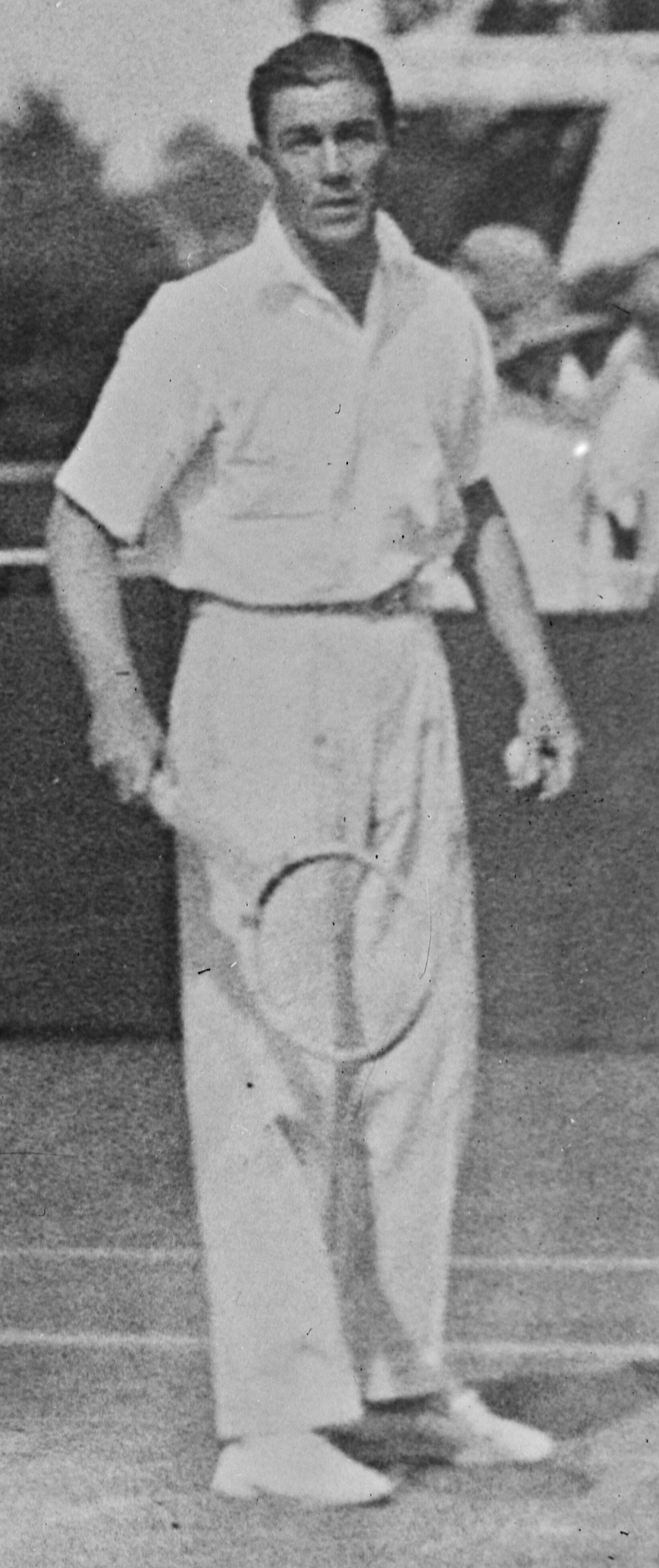
- Full name: John David Patrick Wheatley
- Country (sports): Great Britain
- Born: 20 January 1899 Vryheid, Colony of Natal
- Died: 5 November 1967 (aged 68) London, England

Grand Slam singles results
- Wimbledon: 4R (1924, 1926)

Other tournaments
- WHCC: 4R (1923)
- Olympic Games: 2R (1924)

Grand Slam doubles results
- Wimbledon: QF (1924)

Other doubles tournaments
- Olympic Games: 1R (1924)

Grand Slam mixed doubles results
- Wimbledon: SF (1925)

Team competitions
- Davis Cup: F^{Eu} (1926)

John David Patrick Wheatley (20 January 1899 – 5 November 1967) was an English tennis player who played at Wimbledon, in the Olympics and in the Davis Cup.

== Biography ==
Wheatley was born in Vryheid, Colony of Natal on 1 January 1899 and was educated at Bedford School. Between 1921 and 1933, he competed at Wimbledon on eleven separate occasions, reaching the fourth round in the Men's Singles in 1924 and 1926, reaching the quarterfinals in the men's doubles in 1924, and reaching the semifinals in the mixed in 1925.

He represented Great Britain at the 1924 Summer Olympics in both the Men's Singles and the Men's Doubles. He also represented Great Britain in the Davis Cup in 1926, playing in matches against Italy and Poland.

Wheatley died in London on 5 November 1967.
