= Ivie Richardson =

South African tennis player

- Full name: Ivie John Richardson
- Country (sports): South Africa
- Born: 16 January 1895 Vereeniging, South African Republic
- Died: 10 January 1960 (aged 64) Port Elizabeth, South Africa

Singles

Grand Slam singles results
- Wimbledon: 4R (1924)

Doubles

Grand Slam doubles results
- Wimbledon: 3R (1924)

Ivie John Richardson (16 January 1895 – 10 January 1960) was a male tennis player from South Africa.

In 1924 Richardson and his compatriot partner Jack Condon competed in the men's doubles event at the 1924 Summer Olympics in Paris and reached the semifinal, defeating the American team of R. Norris Williams and Watson Washburn in the quarterfinal. In the semifinal they were defeated in four sets by the French team of Jacques Brugnon and Henri Cochet and in the bronze medal match lost in straight sets to René Lacoste and Jean Borotra. In the singles event he lost in the third round to Cochet.

In 1924 he played in one tie for the South African Davis Cup team against Great Britain, losing in straight sets to Patrick Wheatly on the grass courts of Yorkshire LTC in Scarborough, England.

In 1925 Richardson won the singles title of the South African Championships, defeating compatriot Charles Winslow in a five set final.
