= Félix del Canto =

Mexican tennis player (1893–1962)

Personal information
- Born: 21 June 1893; Puebla, Mexico
- Died: 29 January 1962 (aged 68); Mexico City, Mexico

Sport
- Sport: Tennis

Félix del Canto (21 June 1893 – 29 January 1962) was a Mexican tennis player. He competed in the men's singles and doubles events at the 1924 Summer Olympics.
