= James Bayley (tennis) =

Australian tennis player (1899–1981)

John Bayley
- Full name: John Manton Bayley
- Country (sports): Australia
- Born: 4 November 1899; Dubbo, Australia
- Died: 17 October 1981 (aged 81); Malvern, Australia
- Height: 1.85 m (6 ft 1 in)

Singles

Grand Slam singles results
- Australian Open: 3R (1928)
- Wimbledon: 3R (1924)

Other tournaments
- Olympic Games: 3R (1924)

Doubles

Grand Slam doubles results
- Wimbledon: 1R (1924)
- Olympic Games: 2R (1924)

Grand Slam mixed doubles results
- Wimbledon: 1R (1924)

John Bayley (15 November 1899 – 17 October 1981) was an Australian male tennis player who represented Australian in the Olympic Games. He competed in the singles event at the 1924 Summer Olympics, reaching the third round in which he lost to Brian Gilbert. With compatriot James Willard he competed in the men's doubles event and reached the second round.

He competed in the 1924 Wimbledon Championships and reached the third round in the singles event and lost in the first round of the doubles and mixed doubles event.
