= Donald Rutnam =

Ceylonese-Indian civil servant and sportsman

Personal information
- Born: Donald Ross Rutnam; 19 September 1902 Colombo, British Ceylon
- Died: 10 June 1968 (aged 65) Dulwich, London, England

Sport
- Country: India
- Sport: Tennis

Donald Ross Rutnam (19 September 1902 – 10 June 1968) was an Indian civil servant and sportsman of Anglo-Ceylonese origin. He was a member of the Ceylon Civil Service and served as the Deputy Commissioner of the Central Provinces and Berar. He represented India in Tennis at the 1924 Summer Olympics and at the Wimbledon Championships. Born in Colombo, Ceylon, Rutnam was educated at Royal College Colombo where he captained the college cricket team at the Royal–Thomian. He died on 10 June 1968 in Dulwich, United Kingdom.
