= John Peacock (tennis) =

New Zealand tennis player (1879–1939)

- Full name: John Campbell Peacock
- Country (sports): New Zealand
- Born: 2 November 1879
- Died: 9 September 1939 (aged 59) Wellington, New Zealand

Singles

Grand Slam singles results
- Australian Open: 1R (1912)
- Wimbledon: 1R (1924, 1928)

John Campbell Peacock (2 November 1879 – 9 September 1939) was a New Zealand tennis player.

A solicitor by profession, Peacock was a seven time singles finalist at the New Zealand Championships, winning titles in 1901 and 1910. He later contributed to New Zealand tennis in an administrative capacity and participated in a 1924 Davis Cup tie against Czechoslovakia while serving as vice president of the New Zealand Lawn Tennis Association.

Peacock died in a car accident in 1939 when his vehicle collided with a steam shovel that was being towed.

== See also ==
- List of New Zealand Davis Cup team representatives
