= Jack Condon =

South African tennis player

- Full name: John Joseph Condon
- Country (sports): South Africa
- Born: 9 September 1903; Johannesburg, Transvaal Colony
- Died: 1 January 1967 (aged 63); Estcourt, South Africa

Singles

Grand Slam singles results
- French Open: 3R (1927, 1933)
- Wimbledon: 3R (1933)

Doubles

Grand Slam doubles results
- Wimbledon: SF (1927)

Mixed doubles

Grand Slam mixed doubles results
- Wimbledon: QF (1927)

John Joseph Condon (9 September 1909 – 1 January 1967) was a former male tennis player from South Africa.

In 1924 Condon and his compatriot partner Ivie Richardson competed in the men's doubles event at the 1924 Summer Olympics in Paris and reached the semifinal, defeating the American team of R. Norris Williams and Watson Washburn in the quarterfinal. In the semifinal they were defeated in four sets by the French team of Jacques Brugnon and Henri Cochet and in the bronze medal match lost in straight sets to René Lacoste and Jean Borotra.

Condon won the singles title of the South African Championships in 1926, defeating compatriot Cecil Blackbeard in three straight sets, and was a finalist in 1923, losing to Louis Raymond.

In 1927 and 1933 he played in five ties for the South African Davis Cup team. The best team result during that period was reaching the semifinal of the European Zone in 1927 against France. South Africa lost the semifinal, played at Devonshire Park in Eastbourne, England 0–5 against the French team consisting of the famous Four Musketeers Lacoste, Borotra, Cochet and Brugnon. Condon had a Davis Cup match record of six wins vs. five losses.

== Single titles ==
- 1925 : The Rand Championships (Johannesburg)
- 1926 : South African Championships (Johannesburg)
