= Ron McKenzie (tennis) =

New Zealand tennis player

Ronald McKenzie
- Country (sports): New Zealand
- Residence: New Zealand
- Born: New Zealand

Singles
- Career record: 3–9 (25.00%)
- Career titles: 0 ATP
- Highest ranking: -
- Last updated on: 25 July 2016.

Ronald McKenzie was a New Zealand professional tennis player who reached the final of Auckland Invitation in 1960, where he lost to Roy Emerson 6–3, 6–1, 6–1.

In 1940, he was the New Zealand Junior tennis champion, but his tennis career was then interrupted by World War II. After the war, he held the national men's title four times, and the doubles title six time. McKenzie, John Barry and Jeff Robson formed the 1947 New Zealand Davis Cup team, and they travelled to Europe by container ship. Their training on the deck of the freighter came to an end when they lost all their tennis balls overboard. The team was arrested during the journey as there were problems with their documentation. One of McKenzie's more notable appearances resulted on this journey when he turned around a 2 nil lead by Norway into a 3 to 2 win by his team in the 1947 Davis Cup. He played the Wimbledon Championships that year and was beaten by Enrique Morea from Argentina in the second round. McKenzie was New Zealand's best player in the 1950s.

== Career finals ==
=== Singles: 1 (1 runner-up) ===
| Legend Grand Slam tournaments (0–0) ATP Tour Championships (0–0) | Titles by surface Hard (0–0) Grass (0–0) Clay (0–1) |

| Result | Date | Tournament | Surface | Opponent | Score |
|---|---|---|---|---|---|
| Runner-up | 1960 | Auckland Open, New Zealand | Clay | (Australia) Roy Emerson | 3–6, 1–6, 1–6 |
