= Richard Hawkes (tennis) =

New Zealand judge and tennis player

- Full name: Richard Neville Hawkes
- Country (sports): New Zealand
- Born: 29 November 1940
- Died: 6 August 2001 (aged 60)

Singles

Grand Slam singles results
- French Open: 1R (1962, 1968)
- US Open: 1R (1969)

Richard Neville Hawkes (29 November 1940 – 6 August 2001) was a New Zealand judge and tennis player.

Hawkes had a sporting background, with his father a New Zealand Universities rugby representative and his mother an all-round sportsperson from Taranaki. He was active on the international tour in the 1960s, featuring in the singles main draws of the French Open and US Open. In 1968 he represented the New Zealand Davis Cup team in a 1968 tie against Yugoslavia in Zagreb, partnering Brian Fairlie in the doubles rubber. He scored an upset win over former American Davis Cup captain Donald Dell at the 1970 New Zealand Open.

A graduate of Victoria University of Wellington, Hawkes was admitted as a New Zealand barrister in 1968 and relocated to Hong Kong during the late 1970s. He became a Hong Kong District Judge in 1991 and was appointed Chief District Judge in 1999, a role he held for two years before retiring due to ill health.

Hawkes married squash player Julie Lamb and they raised their four children in Hong Kong (three daughters and one son). One of their children is Commonwealth Games squash gold medalist Jaclyn Hawkes.

== See also ==
- List of New Zealand Davis Cup team representatives
