= Syed Mohammad Hadi =

Indian tennis player

Syed Mohammed Hadi
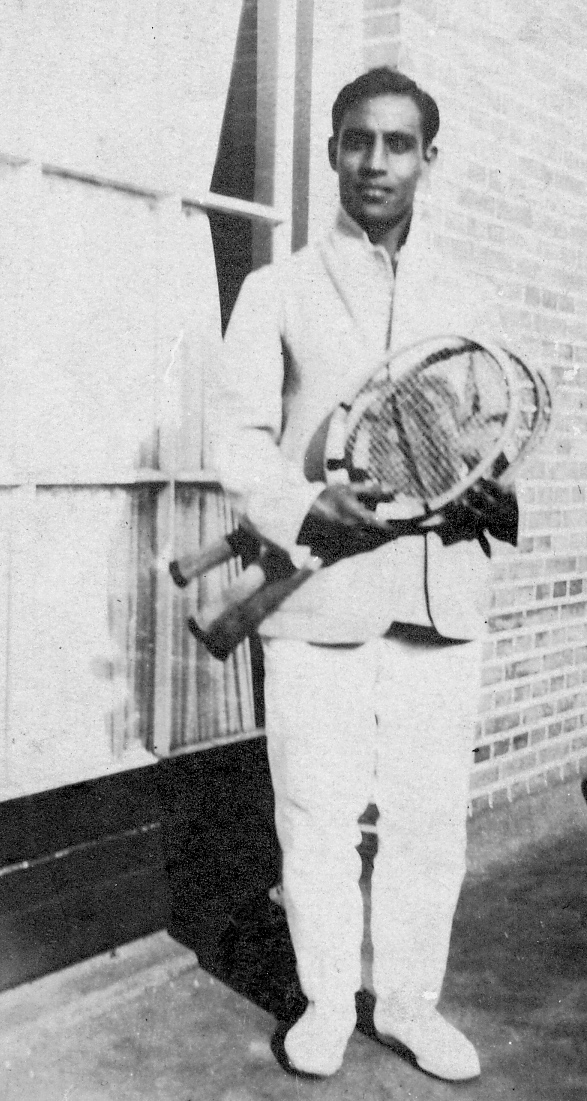
- Hadi as Davis Cup player in about 1925
- Born: 12 August 1899
- Died: 14 July 1971 (aged 71); Hyderabad, Andhra Pradesh, India
- Education: Nizam College; Peterhouse, Cambridge University
- Relatives: Syed Ali Akbar (brother); Asman Jah (adoptive father) Syed Ahmed Hadi (grandson)
- Cricket career

Cricket information
- Batting: Right-handed
- Role: Batsman

Career statistics
Competition	First-class
Matches	24
Runs scored	1,043
Batting average	32.59
100s/50s	2/3
Top score	132*
Catches/stumpings	9/0
- Source: ESPN Cricinfo, 27 September 2018

Syed Mohammad Hadi (12 August 1899 – 14 July 1971) was one of the most gifted pioneering athletes of India. He not only represented India in cricket and tennis, but was also proficient in field hockey, football, table tennis, chess, and polo. He was nicknamed "Rainbow Hadi" because of his expertise in these seven sports.

== Early years ==
Hadi's father, Captain Syed Mohammed, was an officer in the Paigah army in Hyderabad State and died when Hadi was barely two years old. He was supported by the family of, Sir Asman Jah, the former Prime Minister of Hyderabad State, in the court of the Nizam of Hyderabad. He was raised alongside, Asman Jah's son Nawab Moin-Ud-Dowlah, who would become a leading patron of sports in Hyderabad.

Hadi learned horse riding and polo as a youth and played soccer for Nizam College. Recognizing their ward's exceptional athletic abilities, Asman Jah's family helped arrange for his studies in England. Along with Syed Abdul Rahim, he was one of the founding members of Hyderabad Football Association (incorporated in 1939).

== Tennis career ==
As a tennis player Hadi burst on to the international scene while studying at Cambridge University where he studied at Peterhouse and worked hard to become a Cambridge Blue. He helped the Cambridge team score a series of victories against Oxford University and visiting American teams. He also earned university colours in field hockey, soccer, and table tennis.

Denied the captaincy of the Cambridge team because he was an Indian, he vindicated his claim by representing India at the Davis Cup in 1924 and 1925. He also represented India at Wimbledon for five years and in 1926 reached the quarterfinals in doubles. He was one of the first Indians to compete as a tennis player at the Olympics (1924 Summer Olympics).

== Cricketer ==
As a cricketer he played several first-class cricket matches for Hyderabad. When the Ranji Trophy was instituted in 1934, Hadi became the first batsman to score a century. He was also on the Indian team in 1936 when they played an "unofficial Test match" against the Australians led by Jack Ryder. He continued to play for the Hyderabad XI in the Ranji Trophy till 1941. Many of his siblings were also accomplished sportsmen. His brothers Hussein Mohammad and Ashgar Ali were first class cricketers.

== Sports and public service ==
In 1939-40 Hadi along with his brother Col. Ali Raza, Nawab Mahmood Yar Jung, S.A. Rahim and Ahmed Mohiuddin was one of the founding members of the Hyderabad Football Association and the Hyderabad Cricket Association. After retiring from athletics, Hadi continued his involvement in sports as an educator. He had an MA from Cambridge and a master's from the University of Pennsylvania. Hadi was the Director of Physical Education in Hyderabad and ultimately became Joint Secretary of Education in the Indian Government. Another brother Syed Ali Akbar was also a prominent educator of Hyderabad. Hadi was an avid supporter of the Scout Movement and received the Wood Badge. He was the National Commissioner of the Boy Scouts of India.

When the All-India Council of Sports was formed in 1959 he became its first secretary.

== Legacy ==
Hadi died in his native Hyderabad, Andhra Pradesh, of lung cancer at the age of 72. In an obituary published on 3 September 1971 the Indian Express wrote - "It is but given to a few and seldom to shine in so many sports." The man who adopted him, Nawab Moin-Ud-Dowlah, was also a great patron of cricket in India. The Moin-ud-Dowlah Gold Cup Cricket Tournament is played to this day. The tournament's runner-up trophy is now called the S.M. Hadi Memorial Trophy.
