= 1931 World Table Tennis Championships – Mixed doubles =

1931 Mixed doubles
- Location: Budapest

The 1931 World Table Tennis Championships mixed doubles was the fifth edition of the mixed doubles championship.

Miklós Szabados and Mária Mednyánszky defeated Viktor Barna and Anna Sipos in the final by three sets to one.

== Results ==
Round of 16
(Romania) András Steiner (Romania) Irma Papos	13	22	17	15
(Kingdom of Hungary) Sandor Glancz (Kingdom of Hungary) Magda Gál	21	20	21	21
(Kingdom of Hungary) Somgyi (Kingdom of Hungary) Lili Tiszai-Tenner	12	22	15	8
(Czechoslovakia) Bedřich Nikodém (Czechoslovakia) Marie Šmídová	21	20	21	21
(Austria) Alfred Liebster (Austria) Lili Forbath	20	14	15
(England) Adrian Haydon (Germany) Mona Müller	22	21	21
(Austria) Robert Thum (Kingdom of Hungary) Darday	scr
(Kingdom of Hungary) Viktor Barna (Kingdom of Hungary) Anna Sipos	w/o
(Kingdom of Hungary) Miklós Szabados (Kingdom of Hungary) Mária Mednyánszky	21	21	21
(England) David Jones (Kingdom of Hungary) Fekete	13	10	8
(Germany) Nikita Madjaroglou (Germany) Astrid Krebsbach	w/o
(England) Charles Bull (Kingdom of Hungary) Zala	scr
(Austria) Manfred Feher (Austria) Helly Reitzer	21	21	21
(England) Stanley Proffitt (Kingdom of Hungary) Magy Darvas	18	8	10
(Kingdom of Hungary) Laszlo Bellak (Kingdom of Hungary) Márta Komáromi	21	11	21	21
(Kingdom of Hungary) István Kelen (Kingdom of Hungary) Emilné Rácz	12	21	12	11

Quarterfinals
(Kingdom of Hungary) Glanz (Kingdom of Hungary) Gál	16	21	21	21
(Czechoslovakia) Nikodém (Czechoslovakia) Šmídová	21	8	14	12
(England) Haydon (Germany) Müller	21	15	15	17
(Kingdom of Hungary) Barna (Kingdom of Hungary) Sipos	19	21	21	21
(Kingdom of Hungary) Szabados (Kingdom of Hungary) Mednyánszky	21	21	21
(Germany) Madjaroglou (Germany) Krebsbach	11	7	6
(Austria) Feher (Austria) Reitzer	13	10	21	13
(Kingdom of Hungary) Bellak (Kingdom of Hungary) Komáromi	21	21	12	21

Semifinals
(Kingdom of Hungary) Glancz (Kingdom of Hungary) Gál	17	15	24	19
(Kingdom of Hungary) Barna (Kingdom of Hungary) Sipos	21	21	22	21
(Kingdom of Hungary) Szabados (Kingdom of Hungary) Mednyánszky	21	21	21
(Kingdom of Hungary) Bellak (Kingdom of Hungary) Komáromi	18	11	18

Final
(Kingdom of Hungary) Barna (Kingdom of Hungary) Sipos	13	18	21	18
(Kingdom of Hungary) Szabados (Kingdom of Hungary) Mednyánszky	21	21	16	21

== See also ==
List of World Table Tennis Championships medalists
