= 1929 World Table Tennis Championships – Mixed doubles =

1929 Mixed doubles

The 1929 World Table Tennis Championships mixed doubles was the third edition of the mixed doubles championship.

István Kelen and Anna Sipos defeated Laszlo Bellak and Magda Gál in the final by three sets to one.

== Results ==
Round of 16
(England) Adrian Haydon (Germany) Erika Metzger | w/o
(England) Fred Perry (England) Marjorie Haydon | scr
(Kingdom of Hungary) Laszlo Bellak (Kingdom of Hungary) Magda Gál | 21 | 21 | 21
(England) A.E. Stilwell (England) Reischig | 15 | 15 | 12
(Kingdom of Hungary) Zoltán Mechlovits (Kingdom of Hungary) Mária Mednyánszky | 21 | 21 | 21 | 21
(Czechoslovakia) Antonín Maleček (Czechoslovakia) Marie Masáková | 18 | 10 | 23 | 15
(England) Frank Burls (England) Collett | 21 | 15 | 21 | 13 | 17
(Austria) Paul Flussmann (Austria) Helly Reitzer | 9 | 21 | 17 | 21 | 21
(Kingdom of Hungary) Sandor Glancz (Kingdom of Hungary) IIona Zádor | 21 | 21 | 21
14 | 12 | 19
(Austria) Alfred Liebster (Austria) Gertrude Wildam | 21 | 21 | 21
(England) Way (Kingdom of Hungary) Varga | 10 | 7 | 10
(Austria) Erwin Kohn (Austria) Josefine Kolbe | 9 | 14 | 23 | 11
(Kingdom of Hungary) István Kelen (Kingdom of Hungary) Anna Sipos | 21 | 21 | 21 | 21
(Austria) Manfred Feher (Austria) Lili Forbath | 15 | 11 | 21 | 26 | 21
(England) Charles Bull (England) Joan Ingram | 21 | 21 | 19 | 24 | 19

Quarterfinals
(England) Haydon (Germany) Metzger | 17 | 21 | 17 | 20
(Kingdom of Hungary) Bellak (Kingdom of Hungary) Gál | 21 | 15 | 21 | 22
(Kingdom of Hungary) Mechlovits (Kingdom of Hungary) Mednyánszky | 23 | 21 | 21
(Austria) Flussmann (Austria) Reitzer | 21 | 18 | 13
(Kingdom of Hungary) Glancz (Kingdom of Hungary) Zádor | 21 | 4 | 14 | 12
(Austria) Liebster (Austria) Wildam | 16 | 21 | 21 | 21
(Kingdom of Hungary) Kelen (Kingdom of Hungary) Sipos | 21 | 22 | 21
(Austria) Feher (Austria) Forbath | 10 | 20 | 15

Semifinals
(Kingdom of Hungary) Bellak (Kingdom of Hungary) Gál | 21 | 13 | 21 | 11 | 21
(Kingdom of Hungary) Mechlovits (Kingdom of Hungary) Mednyánszky | 16 | 21 | 18 | 21 | 16
(Austria) Liebster (Austria) Wildam | 15 | 16 | 17
(Kingdom of Hungary) Kelen (Kingdom of Hungary) Sipos | 21 | 21 | 21

Final
(Kingdom of Hungary) Bellak (Kingdom of Hungary) Gál | 21 | 7 | 13 | 8
(Kingdom of Hungary) Kelen (Kingdom of Hungary) Sipos | 19 | 21 | 21 | 21

== See also ==
List of World Table Tennis Championships medalists
