= 1931 World Table Tennis Championships – Men's team =

1931 Swaythling Cup (men's team)
- Location: Budapest

The 1931 World Table Tennis Championships – Swaythling Cup (men's team) was the fifth edition of the men's team championship.

Hungary won the gold medal following a perfect 10-0 match record.

== Swaythling Cup final table ==
Pos	Team	P	W	L	Squad
1	Hungary	10	10	0	Viktor Barna, Laszlo Bellak, Lajos Dávid, István Kelen, Miklós Szabados
2	England	10	8	2	Charles Bull, Adrian Haydon, David Jones, Stanley Proffitt, Tommy Sears
2	Czechoslovakia	10	8	2	Stanislav Kolář, Jindřich Lauterbach, Antonín Maleček, Bedřich Nikodém, Karel Svoboda
4	Sweden	10	7	3	Allan Dammberg. Valter Kolmodin, Hille Nilsson, Gustaf Johnsson
5	Germany	10	6	4	Kurt Entholt, Nikita Madjaroglou, Heinz Nickelsburg, Rudolf Schwager, Misha Zabludowsky
6	Austria	10	5	5	Manfred Feher, Paul Flussmann, Alfred Liebster
6	Latvia	10	5	5	Mordecai Finberg, Arnold Oschin, Kārlis Paegle, I. Schatzow
8	Romania	10	3	7	István Goldstein, Tibor Guttmann, András Steiner, Stern
9	(Socialist Federal Republic of Yugoslavia) Yugoslavia	10	2	8	Aleksandar Frntić, Ladislav Hexner, Stevica Maksimović, Martin Steiner, Zlatko Weiller
10	Lithuania	10	1	9	M. Blumenthal, E. Glickmann, Mykulas Glickmann, Choné Simensas, Samuelis Vitkindas
11	India	10	0	10	P.S.V Ayyar, Khorana, Wishnu Kirloskar, Navara
12	Poland +	0	0	0	

+ withdrew

== See also ==
List of World Table Tennis Championships medalists
