= 1932 World Table Tennis Championships – Men's doubles =

1932 Men's doubles

The 1932 World Table Tennis Championships men's doubles was the sixth edition of the men's doubles championship. Miklós Szabados and Viktor Barna defeated Laszlo Bellak and Sándor Glancz in the final by three sets to one win a fourth consecutive title.

== Results ==
Round of 16
(Czechoslovakia) Karel Moravcek (Czechoslovakia) Hoffmann	scr
(England) Charles Bull (England) David Jones	w/o
(Austria) Paul Flussmann (Austria) Erwin Kohn	21	14	21	13	17
(Kingdom of Hungary) Lajos Dávid (Kingdom of Hungary) István Kelen	12	21	19	21	21
(Kingdom of Hungary) Miklós Szabados (Kingdom of Hungary) Viktor Barna	21	21	18	21
(Germany) Nikita Madjaroglou (Germany) Heinz Nickelsburg	16	15	21	13
(Czechoslovakia) Jindřich Lauterbach (Czechoslovakia) Karel Svoboda	18	13	17
(Kingdom of Hungary) György Szegedi (Kingdom of Hungary) Ferenc Kovács	21	21	21
(England) Stanley Proffitt (Latvia) I Schatzow	21	23	21
(Czechoslovakia) Jaroslav Jílek (Czechoslovakia) Smisek	13	21	17
(Kingdom of Hungary) Laszlo Bellak (Kingdom of Hungary) Sándor Glancz	21	21	23
(Czechoslovakia) Dittrich (Czechoslovakia) Zilina	16	18	21
(Kingdom of Hungary) István Boros (Kingdom of Hungary) Tibor Házi	w/o
(Czechoslovakia) Hejna (Czechoslovakia) Grodnicky	scr
(England) Adrian Haydon (England) Edward Rimer	18	22	17	23	21
(Czechoslovakia) Stanislav Kolář (Czechoslovakia) Wachtl	21	20	21	21	23

Quarterfinals
(England) Bull (England) Jones	18	21	22	22
(Kingdom of Hungary) Dávid (Kingdom of Hungary) Kelen	21	16	20	20
(Kingdom of Hungary) Szabados (Kingdom of Hungary) Barna	21	22	22
(Kingdom of Hungary) Szegedi (Kingdom of Hungary) Kovács	18	20	20
(England) Proffitt (Latvia) Schatow	17	21	19	14
(Kingdom of Hungary) Bellak (Kingdom of Hungary) Glancz	21	15	21	21
(Kingdom of Hungary) Boros (Kingdom of Hungary) Házi	21	21	22
(Czechoslovakia) Stanislav Kolář (Czechoslovakia) Wachtl	16	18	20

Semifinals
(England) Bull (England) Jones	11	5	18
(Kingdom of Hungary) Szabados (Kingdom of Hungary) Barna	21	21	21
(Kingdom of Hungary) Bellak (Kingdom of Hungary) Glancz	16	21	23	22
(Kingdom of Hungary) Boros (Kingdom of Hungary) Házi	21	19	21	20

Final
(Kingdom of Hungary) Szabados (Kingdom of Hungary) Barna	21	21	18	21
(Kingdom of Hungary) Bellak (Kingdom of Hungary) Glancz	15	19	21	18

== See also ==
List of World Table Tennis Championships medalists
