= 1931 World Table Tennis Championships =

The 5th World Table Tennis Championships were held in Budapest from February 10 to February 15, 1931.

== Medalists ==
=== Team ===
Event	Gold	Silver	Bronze
Swaythling Cup; Men's team	Hungary; Viktor Barna; Laszlo Bellak; Lajos Dávid; István Kelen; Miklós Szabados	England; Charles Bull; Adrian Haydon; David Jones; Stanley Proffitt; Tommy Sears	
Swaythling Cup; Men's team	Hungary; Viktor Barna; Laszlo Bellak; Lajos Dávid; István Kelen; Miklós Szabados	Czechoslovakia; Stanislav Kolář; Jindřich Lauterbach; Antonín Maleček; Bedřich Nikodém; Karel Svoboda	

=== Individual ===
Event	Gold	Silver	Bronze
Men's singles	(Kingdom of Hungary) Miklós Szabados	(Kingdom of Hungary) Viktor Barna	(Kingdom of Hungary) Ferenc Kovács
Men's singles	(Kingdom of Hungary) Miklós Szabados	(Kingdom of Hungary) Viktor Barna	(Weimar Republic) Nikita Madjaroglou
Women's singles	(Kingdom of Hungary) Mária Mednyánszky	(Weimar Republic) Mona Muller-Rüster	(Kingdom of Hungary) Magda Gál
Women's singles	(Kingdom of Hungary) Mária Mednyánszky	(Weimar Republic) Mona Muller-Rüster	(Kingdom of Hungary) Anna Sipos
Men's doubles	(Kingdom of Hungary) Viktor Barna (Kingdom of Hungary) Miklós Szabados	(Kingdom of Hungary) Lajos Dávid (Kingdom of Hungary) István Kelen	(Czechoslovakia) Jindřich Lauterbach (Czechoslovakia) Karel Svoboda
Men's doubles	(Kingdom of Hungary) Viktor Barna (Kingdom of Hungary) Miklós Szabados	(Kingdom of Hungary) Lajos Dávid (Kingdom of Hungary) István Kelen	(Austria) Manfred Feher (Austria) Alfred Liebster
Women's doubles	(Kingdom of Hungary) Mária Mednyánszky (Kingdom of Hungary) Anna Sipos	(Kingdom of Hungary) Magda Gál (Kingdom of Hungary) Lili Tiszai	(Austria) Lili Forbath (Austria) Helly Reitzer
Women's doubles	(Kingdom of Hungary) Mária Mednyánszky (Kingdom of Hungary) Anna Sipos	(Kingdom of Hungary) Magda Gál (Kingdom of Hungary) Lili Tiszai	(Weimar Republic) Mona Muller-Rüster (Czechoslovakia) Marie Šmídová
Mixed doubles	(Kingdom of Hungary) Miklós Szabados (Kingdom of Hungary) Mária Mednyánszky	(Kingdom of Hungary) Viktor Barna (Kingdom of Hungary) Anna Sipos	(Kingdom of Hungary) Sándor Glancz (Kingdom of Hungary) Magda Gál
Mixed doubles	(Kingdom of Hungary) Miklós Szabados (Kingdom of Hungary) Mária Mednyánszky	(Kingdom of Hungary) Viktor Barna (Kingdom of Hungary) Anna Sipos	(Kingdom of Hungary) Laszlo Bellak (Kingdom of Hungary) Márta Komáromi
