= 1931 World Table Tennis Championships – Men's doubles =

1931 Men's doubles
- Location: Budapest

The 1931 World Table Tennis Championships men's doubles was the fifth edition of the men's doubles championship. Miklós Szabados and Viktor Barna defeated Lajos Dávid and István Kelen in the final by three sets to one win a third consecutive title.

== Results ==
Round of 16
(Kingdom of Hungary) Miklós Szabados (Kingdom of Hungary) Viktor Barna	21	21	21
(Latvia) Mordecai Finberg (Latvia) Arnold Oschin	19	15	10
(Kingdom of Hungary) Kerekes (Kingdom of Hungary) Mihály Lantos	11	15	16
(Kingdom of Hungary) István Boros (Kingdom of Hungary) Ernő Földi	21	21	21
(Romania) András Steiner (Romania) István Goldstein	19	15	21	19
(Kingdom of Hungary) Béla Nyitrai (Kingdom of Hungary) Tibor Házi	21	21	17	21
(Czechoslovakia) Jindřich Lauterbach (Czechoslovakia) Karel Svoboda	21	21	21
(Austria) Billig (Austria) Paul Flussmann	18	14	13
(Germany) Nikita Madjaroglou (Germany) Heinz Nickelsburg	15	21	21	21
(England) Charles Bull (England) David Jones	21	17	18	16
(Austria) Manfred Feher (Austria) Alfred Liebster	21	21	21
(Kingdom of Hungary) Tibor Surossi (Kingdom of Hungary) Laszlo Toldi	15	4	8
(Kingdom of Hungary) Lajos Dávid (Kingdom of Hungary) István Kelen	21	21	16	17	22
(Czechoslovakia) Antonín Maleček (Czechoslovakia) Bedřich Nikodém	16	18	21	21	20
(Kingdom of Hungary) György Szegedi (Kingdom of Hungary) László Suranyi	21	16	19
(Kingdom of Hungary) Laszlo Bellak (Kingdom of Hungary) Imre Magyar-Muller	23	21	21

Quarterfinals
(Kingdom of Hungary) Szabados (Kingdom of Hungary) Barna	21	21	21
(Kingdom of Hungary) Boros (Kingdom of Hungary) Foldi	16	16	14
(Kingdom of Hungary) Nyitrai (Kingdom of Hungary) Hazi	21	13	17	7
(Czechoslovakia) Lauterbach (Czechoslovakia) Svoboda	19	12	21	21
(Germany) Madjaroglou (Germany) Nickelsburg	18	10	15
(Austria) Feher (Austria) Liebster	21	21	21
(Kingdom of Hungary) Dávid (Kingdom of Hungary) Kelen	18	19	21	21	21
(Kingdom of Hungary) Bellak (Kingdom of Hungary) Magyar	21	21	16	17	16

Semifinals
(Kingdom of Hungary) Szabados (Kingdom of Hungary) Barna	21	21	21
(Czechoslovakia) Lauterbach (Czechoslovakia) Svoboda	15	15	13
(Austria) Feher (Austria) Liebster	19	16	21	21	14
(Kingdom of Hungary) Dávid (Kingdom of Hungary) Kelen	21	21	15	18	21

Final
(Kingdom of Hungary) Szabados (Kingdom of Hungary) Barna	21	21	20	21
(Kingdom of Hungary) Dávid (Kingdom of Hungary) Kelen	15	16	22	18

== See also ==
List of World Table Tennis Championships medalists
