= 1932 World Table Tennis Championships – Mixed doubles =

1932 Mixed doubles

The 1932 World Table Tennis Championships mixed doubles was the sixth edition of the mixed doubles championship.

Viktor Barna and Anna Sipos defeated Miklós Szabados and Mária Mednyánszky in the final by three sets to nil.

== Results ==
Round of 16
(Austria) Paul Flussmann (Czechoslovakia) Jozka Veselska	18	18	22
(Czechoslovakia) Jindřich Lauterbach (Czechoslovakia) Ambrosiova	21	21	24
(Kingdom of Hungary) Viktor Barna (Kingdom of Hungary) Anna Sipos	18	21	21	21
(Germany) Nikita Madjaroglou (Germany) Annemarie Haensch	21	18	10	16
(Kingdom of Hungary) Sandor Glancz (Kingdom of Hungary) Magda Gál	w/o
(Austria) Erwin Kohn (Czechoslovakia) Krausova	scr
(Germany) Heinz Nickelsburg (Germany) Mona Müller-Rüster	23	16	19	22	15
(Czechoslovakia) Stanislav Kolář (Czechoslovakia) Anna Braunova	21	21	21	24	21
(Kingdom of Hungary) Miklós Szabados (Kingdom of Hungary) Mária Mednyánszky	21	21	21
(Austria) Alfred Liebster (Austria) Helly Reitzer	12	15	7
(Czechoslovakia) Antonín Maleček (Czechoslovakia) Marie Kettnerová	21	21	21
(Czechoslovakia) Michael Grobauer (Czechoslovakia) Degenova	11	16	19
(Czechoslovakia) Behal (Czechoslovakia) Schneiderova	w/o
(Kingdom of Hungary) Laszlo Bellak (France) Monique Ravigneaux	scr
(Czechoslovakia) Jaroslav Jílek (Czechoslovakia) Marie Šmídová	16	21	21	21
(Czechoslovakia) Josef Bláha (Czechoslovakia) Berta Zdobnická	21	17	18	17

Quarterfinals
(Czechoslovakia) Lauterbach (Czechoslovakia) Ambrosiova	scr
(Kingdom of Hungary) Barna (Kingdom of Hungary) Sipos	w/o
(Kingdom of Hungary) Glancz (Kingdom of Hungary) Gál	10	21	21	21
(Czechoslovakia) Kolář (Czechoslovakia) Braunova	21	6	17	17
(Kingdom of Hungary) Szabados (Kingdom of Hungary) Mednyánszky	21	21	21
(Czechoslovakia) Maleček (Czechoslovakia) Kettnerová	18	12	18
(Czechoslovakia) Behal (Czechoslovakia) Schneiderova	22	5	16
(Czechoslovakia) Jílek (Czechoslovakia) Šmídová	24	21	21

Semifinals
(Kingdom of Hungary) Barna (Kingdom of Hungary) Sipos	21	21	21
(Kingdom of Hungary) Glancz (Kingdom of Hungary) Gál	17	16	19
(Kingdom of Hungary) Szabados (Kingdom of Hungary) Mednyánszky	21	21	21
(Czechoslovakia) Jílek (Czechoslovakia) Šmídová	15	14	10

Final
(Kingdom of Hungary) Barna (Kingdom of Hungary) Sipos	21	21	21
(Kingdom of Hungary) Szabados (Kingdom of Hungary) Mednyánszky	13	17	18

== See also ==
- List of World Table Tennis Championships medalists
