= 1932 World Table Tennis Championships – Men's team =

1932 Swaythling Cup (men's team)

The 1932 World Table Tennis Championships – Swaythling Cup (men's team) was the sixth edition of the men's team championship.

Czechoslovakia won the gold medal following a three way play off with Austria and Hungary after all three teams finished with an 8–1 match record. It was the first time that Hungary failed to win the Swaythling Cup.

== Swaythling Cup final table ==
Pos	Team	P	W	L	Squad
1	Czechoslovakia	9	8	1	Michael Grobauer, Stanislav Kolář, Jindřich Lauterbach, Antonín Maleček, Bedřich Nikodém
1	Hungary	9	8	1	Viktor Barna, Laszlo Bellak, Lajos Dávid, István Kelen, Miklós Szabados
1	Austria	9	8	1	Manfred Feher, Paul Flussmann, Erwin Kohn, Alfred Liebster, Robert Thum
4	Latvia	9	6	3	Mordecai Finberg, Arnold Oschin, Schatzow
5	Germany	9	5	4	Paul Benthien, Herbert Caro, Nikita Madjaroglou, Heinz Nickelsburg, Rudolf Schwager
6	India	9	4	5	H.M Barafwala, Jimmy Dass, De Condappa, Wishnu Kirloskar, S. Tagore
7	England	9	3	6	Charles Bull, Adrian Haydon, David Jones, Andrew Millar, Edward Rimer
8	(Socialist Federal Republic of Yugoslavia) Yugoslavia	9	2	7	Ladislav Hexner, Stevica Maksimović, Janez Nemec, Ludovik Nemec, Zlatko Weiller
9	Lithuania	9	1	8	Vladas Dzindziliauskas, Mykulas Glickmann, Juozas Remeikis, Choné Simensas, Samuelis Vitkindas
10	France	9	0	9	Henri Bolleli, Nahas, Hhenri Ozenne, Raymond Verger

== Play Off ==
Pos	Team	P	W	L
1	Czechoslovakia	2	2	0
2	(Kingdom of Hungary) Hungary	2	1	1
3	Austria	2	0	2

== See also ==
List of World Table Tennis Championships medalists
