= 1930 World Table Tennis Championships – Men's doubles =

1930 Men's doubles

The 1930 World Table Tennis Championships men's doubles was the fourth edition of the men's doubles championship. Miklós Szabados and Viktor Barna defeated Alfred Liebster and Robert Thum in the final by three sets to nil to retain their title.

== Results ==
Round of 16
(Kingdom of Hungary) Miklós Szabados (Kingdom of Hungary) Viktor Barna	21	21	21	21
(England) Bernard Hookins (England) Vincent Blatchford	23	12	18	10
(Kingdom of Hungary) Zoltán Mechlovits (Kingdom of Hungary) Imre Magyar-Muller	23	21	21
(Sweden) Ragnar Hallsten (Sweden) Folke Pettersson	21	14	19
(Lithuania) M Blumenthal (Lithuania) Mykulas Glickmann	21	14	17	24	18
(Austria) Paul Flussmann (Austria) Manfred Feher	19	21	21	22	21
(Kingdom of Hungary) Laszlo Bellak (Kingdom of Hungary) Sándor Glancz	w/o
(Kingdom of Hungary) György Szegedi (Kingdom of Hungary) Béla Nyitrai
(Sweden) Valter Kolmodin (Sweden) Hille Nilsson	w/o
(Germany) Kurt Entholt (Germany) W Henschel
(Kingdom of Hungary) Lajos Dávid (Kingdom of Hungary) István Kelen	21	21	25
(England) H.C. Cooke (England) Stanley Proffitt	18	16	23
(Austria) Erwin Kohn (Germany) Nikita Madjaroglou	21	19	14	21	21
(Germany) Hans-Georg Lindenstadt (Germany) E Mayer	16	21	21	18	14
(Austria) Alfred Liebster (Austria) Robert Thum	21	21	21
(Kingdom of Hungary) István Boros (Germany) Herbert Caro	18	17	12

Quarterfinals
(Kingdom of Hungary) Szabados (Kingdom of Hungary) Barna	21	21	23
(Kingdom of Hungary) Mechlovits (Kingdom of Hungary) Magyar	16	15	21
(Austria) Flussmann (Austria) Feher	18	15	12
(Kingdom of Hungary) Bellak (Kingdom of Hungary) Glancz	21	21	21
(Sweden) Kolmedin (Sweden) Nilsson	18	21	21	21
(Kingdom of Hungary) Dávid (Kingdom of Hungary) Kelen	21	12	16	17
(Austria) Kohn (Germany) Madjaroglou	9	18	16
(Austria) Libester (Austria) Thum	21	21	21

Semifinals
(Kingdom of Hungary) Szabados (Kingdom of Hungary) Barna	21	21	16	21
(Kingdom of Hungary) Bellak (Kingdom of Hungary) Glancz	11	19	21	16
(Sweden) Kolmedin (Sweden) Nilsson	17	21	18	16
(Austria) Libester (Austria) Thum	21	17	21	21

Final
(Kingdom of Hungary) Szabados (Kingdom of Hungary) Barna	21	21	21
(Austria) Libester (Austria) Thum	11	14	18

== See also ==
List of World Table Tennis Championships medalists
