= 1930 World Table Tennis Championships – Men's singles =

1930 Men's singles
- Location: Berlin

The 1930 World Table Tennis Championships men's singles was the fourth edition of the men's singles championship.

Viktor Barna met his compatriot Laszlo Bellak in the final of this event. The latter won 21–14, 16–21, 21–16, 21–12.

== Draw ==
=== Key ===
- Q = Qualifier
- w/o = Walkover
- w/d = Withdraw
- r = Retired
- DQ = Disqualified

=== Finals ===
Round of 16
(Kingdom of Hungary) Viktor Barna	21	22	19	22
(Kingdom of Hungary) István Boros	10	20	21	20
(Weimar Republic) Nikita Madjaroglou	21	18	15	18
(Kingdom of Hungary) György Szegedi	18	21	21	21
(Austria) Alfred Liebster	21	21	21
(Weimar Republic) Herbert Caro	16	10	13
(England) Stanley Proffitt	19	20	9
(Kingdom of Hungary) István Kelen	21	22	21
(Kingdom of Hungary) Lajos Dávid	21	21	10	21
(Kingdom of Hungary) Miklós Szabados	13	19	21	14
(Austria) Robert Thum	14	21	6	16
(Czechoslovakia) Bedřich Nikodém	21	15	21	21
(Austria) Paul Flussmann	23	16	21	21	21
(Austria) Manfred Feher	25	21	13	19	18
(England) Vincent Blatchford	24	13	11
(Kingdom of Hungary) Laszlo Bellak	26	21	21

Quarterfinals
(Kingdom of Hungary) Viktor Barna	W/O
(Kingdom of Hungary) György Szegedi
(Austria) Alfred Liebster	16	16	21	13
(Kingdom of Hungary) István Kelen	21	21	7	21
(Kingdom of Hungary) Lajos Dávid	21	21	23
(Czechoslovakia) Bedřich Nikodém	7	19	21
(Austria) Paul Flussmann	15	16	22	11
(Kingdom of Hungary) Laszlo Bellak	21	21	20	21

Semifinals
(Kingdom of Hungary) Viktor Barna	21	22	7	16	21
(Kingdom of Hungary) István Kelen	15	20	21	21	19
(Kingdom of Hungary) Lajos Dávid	13	18	21	18
(Kingdom of Hungary) Laszlo Bellak	21	21	19	21

Final
(Kingdom of Hungary) Viktor Barna	21	16	21	21
(Kingdom of Hungary) Laszlo Bellak	14	21	16	12
