= 1929 World Table Tennis Championships – Men's doubles =

1929 Men's doubles

The 1929 World Table Tennis Championships men's doubles was the third edition of the men's doubles championship. Miklós Szabados and Viktor Barna defeated Sándor Glancz and Laszlo Bellak in the final by three sets to nil.

== Results ==
Round of 16
(Kingdom of Hungary) Miklós Szabados (Kingdom of Hungary) Viktor Barna	3
(Czechoslovakia) Antonin Malecek (Czechoslovakia) Bohumil Hájek	0
(Kingdom of Hungary) Imre Magyar-Muller (Kingdom of Hungary) László Meszoli	0
(England) Adrian Haydon (England) Frank Burls	3
(Latvia) Mordecai Finberg (Latvia) I Rosenthal	1
(Kingdom of Hungary) Lajos Dávid (Sweden) Valter Kolmodin	3
(Austria) Alfred Liebster (Austria) Robert Thum	2
(Kingdom of Hungary) György Szegedi (Kingdom of Hungary) Istvan Reti	3
(England) Charles Bull (England) Fred Perry	3
(Latvia) Arnold Oschin (Latvia) A. Stauer	0
(Austria) Erwin Kohn (Austria) Munio Pillinger	0
(Kingdom of Hungary) Zoltán Mechlovits (Kingdom of Hungary) István Kelen	3
(Austria) Paul Flussmann (Austria) Manfred Feher	3
(Kingdom of Hungary) Béla Nyitrai (Kingdom of Hungary) Ernő Földi	1
(Kingdom of Hungary) Laszlo Bellak (Kingdom of Hungary) Sándor Glancz	3
(Czechoslovakia) Mikuláš Fried (Czechoslovakia) Josef Bergmann	0

Quarterfinals
(Kingdom of Hungary) Szabados (Kingdom of Hungary) Barna	21	20	21	21
(England) Haydon (England) Burls	17	22	18	17
(Kingdom of Hungary) Dávid (Sweden) Kolmodin	15	12	17
(Kingdom of Hungary) Szegedi (Kingdom of Hungary) Reti	21	21	21
(England) Bull (England) Perry	3
(Kingdom of Hungary) Mechlovits (Kingdom of Hungary) Kelen	2
(Austria) Flussmann (Austria) Feher	1
(Kingdom of Hungary) Bellak (Kingdom of Hungary) Glancz	3

Semifinals
(Kingdom of Hungary) Szabados (Kingdom of Hungary) Barna	21	20	21	22
(Kingdom of Hungary) Szegedi (Kingdom of Hungary) Reti	18	22	14	20
(England) Bull (England) Perry	18	21	21	19	20
(Kingdom of Hungary) Bellak (Kingdom of Hungary) Glancz	21	9	11	21	22

Final
(Kingdom of Hungary) Szabados (Kingdom of Hungary) Barna	21	21	21
(Kingdom of Hungary) Bellak (Kingdom of Hungary) Glancz	15	14	13

== See also ==
- List of World Table Tennis Championships medalists
