= 1930 World Table Tennis Championships – Mixed doubles =

1930 Mixed doubles
- Location: Berlin

The 1930 World Table Tennis Championships mixed doubles was the fourth edition of the mixed doubles championship.

Miklós Szabados and Mária Mednyánszky defeated István Kelen and Anna Sipos in the final by three sets to one.

== Results ==
Quarterfinals
(Kingdom of Hungary) Miklós Szabados (Kingdom of Hungary) Mária Mednyánszky
(Kingdom of Hungary) Valter Kolmodin (Germany) Kuhlmann
(Kingdom of Hungary) Viktor Barna (Kingdom of Hungary) Magda Gál	9	21	21	21
(Kingdom of Hungary) Laszlo Bellakz (Germany) Mona Rüster	21	16	17	17
(Kingdom of Hungary) Sandor Glancz (Germany) Ingeborg Carnatz
(Kingdom of Hungary) István Boros (Germany) Herz
(Austria) Alfred Liebster (Austria) Helly Reitzer
(Kingdom of Hungary) István Kelen (Kingdom of Hungary) Anna Sipos

Semifinals
(Kingdom of Hungary) Szabados (Kingdom of Hungary) Mednyánszky	21	21	21
(Kingdom of Hungary) Barna (Kingdom of Hungary) Gál	13	12	18
(Kingdom of Hungary) Glancz (Germany) Carnatz	21	9	12	20
(Kingdom of Hungary) Kelen (Kingdom of Hungary) Sipos	7	21	21	22

Final
(Kingdom of Hungary) Szabados (Kingdom of Hungary) Mednyánszky	22	21	21	21
(Kingdom of Hungary) Kelen (Kingdom of Hungary) Sipos	20	18	16	19

== See also ==
List of World Table Tennis Championships medalists
