= 1929 World Table Tennis Championships – Women's singles =

1929 Women's singles

The 1929 World Table Tennis Championships women's singles was the third edition of the women's singles championship.

Mária Mednyánszky met Gertrude Wildam in the final of this event winning 21–9, 21–15, 21–12 to secure a third consecutive title.

== Draw ==
=== Key ===
- Q = Qualifier
- w/o = Walkover
- w/d = Withdraw
- r = Retired
- DQ = Disqualified

=== Finals ===
Round of 16
(Kingdom of Hungary) Mária Mednyánszky	21	21	17	21
(Weimar Republic) Mona Rüster	8	12	21	14
(Austria) Fanchette Flamm	17	21	17	21	9
(Latvia) Anna Daukša	21	19	21	17	21
(Austria) Josefine Kolbe	22	21	21
(England) Joan Ingram	20	8	19
(Austria) Helly Reitzer	17	13	15
(Kingdom of Hungary) Anna Sipos	21	21	21
(Kingdom of Hungary) Magda Gál	18	21	21	21
(Czechoslovakia) Marie Masáková	21	13	15	9
(Austria) Lili Forbath	11	11	14
(Weimar Republic) Erika Metzger	21	21	21
(Kingdom of Hungary) Ilona Zádor	21	21	21
(Austria) Anastasia Flussmann	15	12	16
(Kingdom of Hungary) Márta Komáromi	13	17	16
(Austria) Gertrude Wildam	21	21	21

Quarterfinals
(Kingdom of Hungary) Mária Mednyánszky	21	21	21
(Latvia) Anna Daukša	11	17	11
(Austria) Josefine Kolbe	18	17	17
(Kingdom of Hungary) Anna Sipos	21	21	21
(Kingdom of Hungary) Magda Gál	21	16	21	21
(Weimar Republic) Erika Metzger	19	21	11	16
(Kingdom of Hungary) Ilona Zádor	21	13	21	14	16
(Austria) Gertrude Wildam	16	21	17	21	21

Semifinals
(Kingdom of Hungary) Mária Mednyánszky	21	21	21
(Kingdom of Hungary) Anna Sipos	18	13	13
(Kingdom of Hungary) Magda Gál	21	21	17	15	16
(Austria) Gertrude Wildam	16	17	21	21	21

Final
(Kingdom of Hungary) Mária Mednyánszky	21	21	21
(Austria) Gertrude Wildam	9	15	12

== See also ==
List of World Table Tennis Championships medalists
