= 1933 World Table Tennis Championships – Mixed doubles =

1933 Mixed doubles

The 1933 World Table Tennis Championships mixed doubles was the seventh edition of the mixed doubles championship.

István Kelen and Mária Mednyánszky defeated Sandor Glancz and Magda Gál in the final by three sets to two.

== Results ==
Round of 16
(Kingdom of Hungary) Sandor Glancz (Kingdom of Hungary) Magda Gál	21	21	21
(Czechoslovakia) Karel Svoboda (Czechoslovakia) Marie Kettnerová	12	16	17
(Austria) Alfred Liebster (Austria) Gertrude Wildam	w/o
(France) Raymond Verger (France) Yvonne Fayard	scr
(Kingdom of Hungary) Viktor Barna (Kingdom of Hungary) Anna Sipos	22	21	21
(Czechoslovakia) Miloslav Hamr (Germany) Marie Walterová	20	17	17
(Austria) Ladstätter (Austria) Anastasia Flussmann	3
(Germany) Schimmel (Germany) Astrid Krebsbach	2
(Germany) Heinz Nickelsburg (Germany) Anita Felguth	3
(Austria) Erwin Fleischmann (Austria) Lili Forbath	2
(Czechoslovakia) Erwin Koln-Korda (Czechoslovakia) Jozka Veselska	1
(Germany) Nikita Madjaroglou (Germany) Annemarie Schulz	3
(Czechoslovakia) Stanislav Kolář (Czechoslovakia) Marie Šmídová	3
(Austria) Manfred Feher (Austria) Nitschmann	1
(Kingdom of Hungary) István Kelen (Kingdom of Hungary) Mária Mednyánszky	21	21	21
(France) Henri Bolelli (Netherlands) Marica Cimperman	10	7	5

Quarterfinals
(Kingdom of Hungary) Glancz (Kingdom of Hungary) Gál	3
(Austria) Liebster (Austria) Wildam	2
(Kingdom of Hungary) Barna (Kingdom of Hungary) Sipos	20	21	21	21
(Austria) Ladstätter (Austria) Flussmann	22	16	12	7
(Germany) Nickelsburg (Germany) Felguth	1
(Germany) Madjaroglou (Germany) Schulz	3
(Czechoslovakia) Kolář (Czechoslovakia) Šmídová	10	21	13	21	16
(Kingdom of Hungary) Kelen (Kingdom of Hungary) Mednyánszky	21	16	21	16	21

Semifinals
(Kingdom of Hungary) Glancz (Kingdom of Hungary) Gál	17	21	14	26	21
(Kingdom of Hungary) Barna (Kingdom of Hungary) Sipos	21	16	21	24	16
(Germany) Madjaroglou (Germany) Schulz	16	14	19
(Kingdom of Hungary) Kelen (Kingdom of Hungary) Mednyánszky	21	21	21

Final
(Kingdom of Hungary) Glancz (Kingdom of Hungary) Gál	8	19	21	21	18
(Kingdom of Hungary) Kelen (Kingdom of Hungary) Mednyánszky	21	21	14	12	21

== See also ==
List of World Table Tennis Championships medalists
