= 1931 World Table Tennis Championships – Men's singles =

1931 Men's singles
- Location: Budapest

The 1931 World Table Tennis Championships men's singles was the fifth edition of the men's singles championship.

Miklós Szabados met compatriot Viktor Barna in the final of this event. Szabados won the final three sets to nil.

== Draw ==
=== Key ===
- Q = Qualifier
- w/o = Walkover
- w/d = Withdraw
- r = Retired
- DQ = Disqualified

=== Finals ===
Round of 16
(Kingdom of Hungary) Miklós Szabados	21	21	14	21
(England) Charles Bull	13	15	21	19
(Czechoslovakia) Stanislav Kolář	13	14	16
(Kingdom of Hungary) Sándor Glancz	21	21	21
(England) Stanley Proffitt	17	10	21	21	21
(Weimar Republic) Rudolf Schwager	21	21	16	15	19
(Czechoslovakia) Jindřich Lauterbach	15	18	21
(Kingdom of Hungary) Ferenc Kovács	21	21	23
(Weimar Republic) Nikita Madjaroglou	18	21	15	21	21
(Kingdom of Hungary) István Boros	21	15	21	19	14
(Kingdom of Hungary) György Szegedi	21	21	16	21	16
(Kingdom of Hungary) Lajos Dávid	18	10	21	23	21
(Latvia) Arnold Oschin	21	21	21
(Kingdom of Hungary) Sugar	16	16	17
(Austria) Manfred Feher	20	7	21
(Kingdom of Hungary) Viktor Barna	22	21	23

Quarterfinals
(Kingdom of Hungary) Miklós Szabados	21	21	21
(Kingdom of Hungary) Sándor Glancz	8	19	11
(England) Stanley Proffitt	21	11	15	13
(Kingdom of Hungary) Ferenc Kovács	16	21	21	21
(Weimar Republic) Nikita Madjaroglou	8	21	21	21
(Kingdom of Hungary) Lajos Dávid	21	14	10	13
(Latvia) Arnold Oschin	13	17	20
(Kingdom of Hungary) Viktor Barna	21	21	22

Semifinals
(Kingdom of Hungary) Miklós Szabados	19	21	21	21
(Kingdom of Hungary) Ferenc Kovács	21	16	14	13
(Weimar Republic) Nikita Madjaroglou	21	21	8	16	13
(Kingdom of Hungary) Viktor Barna	10	16	21	21	21

Final
(Kingdom of Hungary) Miklós Szabados	21	24	21
(Kingdom of Hungary) Viktor Barna	13	22	14
