= 1929 World Table Tennis Championships – Women's doubles =

1929 Women's doubles

The 1929 World Table Tennis Championships women's doubles was the second edition of the women's doubles championship.

Mona Rüster and Erika Metzger defeated Fanchette Flamm and Gertrude Wildam in the final by three sets to nil.

== Results ==
First Round
(England) Joan Ingram (England) Marjorie Haydon	scr
(Kingdom of Hungary) IIona Zádor (Kingdom of Hungary) Magda Gál	w/o
(Latvia) Anna Daukša (Latvia) Vera Kuharenko	21	17	19	21	11
(Austria) Gertrude Wildam (Austria) Fanchette Flamm	17	21	21	18	21
(Kingdom of Hungary) Mária Mednyánszky (Kingdom of Hungary) Anna Sipos	21	21	21
(Austria) Josefine Kolbe (Austria) Anastasia Flussmann	16	12	11
(Austria) Lili Forbath (Austria) Helly Reitzer	13	17	21	13
(Germany) Erika Metzger (Germany) Mona Rüster	21	21	14	21

Semifinals
(Kingdom of Hungary) Zádor (Kingdom of Hungary) Gál	14	21	13	21	7
(Austria) Wildam (Austria) Flamm	21	12	21	19	21
(Kingdom of Hungary) Mednyánszky (Kingdom of Hungary) Sipos	21	24	15	18	19
(Germany) Metzger (Germany) Rüster	10	22	21	21	21

Final
(Austria) Wildam (Austria) Flamm	14	15	12
(Germany) Metzger (Germany) Rüster	21	21	21

== See also ==
List of World Table Tennis Championships medalists
