= 1932 World Table Tennis Championships – Men's singles =

1932 Men's singles

The 1932 World Table Tennis Championships men's singles was the sixth edition of the men's singles championship.

Viktor Barna defeated Miklós Szabados in the final of this event. Barna won the final three sets to two.

== Draw ==
=== Key ===
- Q = Qualifier
- w/o = Walkover
- w/d = Withdraw
- r = Retired
- DQ = Disqualified

=== Finals ===
Round of 16
(Kingdom of Hungary) Viktor Barna	21	21	9	21
(Weimar Republic) Heinz Nickelsburg	18	10	21	10
(Czechoslovakia) Jaroslav Jílek	21	16	23	10	11
(Kingdom of Hungary) György Szegedi	10	21	21	21	21
(Czechoslovakia) Karel Moravcek	21	21	21
(Kingdom of Yugoslavia) Ladislav Hexner	11	15	17
(Czechoslovakia) Bedřich Nikodém	27	19	21	11	16
(Kingdom of Hungary) István Boros	25	21	13	21	21
(Austria) Erwin Kohn	16	21	21	21
(Czechoslovakia) Karel Svoboda	21	15	10	18
(Kingdom of Hungary) Sándor Glancz	17	16	6
(Kingdom of Hungary) Tibor Házi	21	21	21
(Weimar Republic) Nikita Madjaroglou	11	21	21	21
(Austria) Paul Flussmann	21	15	12	16
(Kingdom of Hungary) Lajos Dávid	21	20	19	21	18
(Kingdom of Hungary) Miklós Szabados	18	22	21	19	21

Quarterfinals
(Kingdom of Hungary) Viktor Barna	21	21	21
(Kingdom of Hungary) György Szegedi	19	19	19
(Czechoslovakia) Karel Moravcek	17	21	15	19
(Kingdom of Hungary) István Boros	21	15	21	21
(Austria) Erwin Kohn	17	15	21	21	22
(Kingdom of Hungary) Tibor Házi	21	21	14	15	20
(Weimar Republic) Nikita Madjaroglou	19	21	18	18
(Kingdom of Hungary) Miklós Szabados	21	12	21	21

Semifinals
(Kingdom of Hungary) Viktor Barna	21	21	23
(Kingdom of Hungary) István Boros	11	19	21
(Austria) Erwin Kohn	21	14	18	14
(Kingdom of Hungary) Miklós Szabados	18	21	21	21

Final
(Kingdom of Hungary) Viktor Barna	21	14	16	21	21
(Kingdom of Hungary) Miklós Szabados	19	21	21	19	18
