= 1930 World Table Tennis Championships – Women's doubles =

1930 Women's doubles
- Location: Berlin

The 1930 World Table Tennis Championships women's doubles was the third edition of the women's doubles championship. Mária Mednyánszky and Anna Sipos defeated Magda Gál and Márta Komáromi in the final by three sets to nil.

== Results ==
Round of 16
(Kingdom of Hungary) Mária Mednyánszky (Kingdom of Hungary) Anna Sipos
bye
(Germany) C Seifert (Germany) G Gonschorek
bye
(Austria) Josefine Kolbe (Austria) Etta Neumann
bye
(Czechoslovakia) Marie Masáková (Germany) Astrid Krebsbach
(Germany) Ingeborg Carnatz (Germany) Kuhlmann
(Germany) Mona Rüster (Germany) Erika Stettiner
bye
(Kingdom of Hungary) Magda Gál (Kingdom of Hungary) Márta Komáromi
bye
(Germany) G. Kurz (Germany) Herz
bye
(Austria) Gertrude Wildam (Austria) Helly Reitzer
bye

Quarterfinals
(Kingdom of Hungary) Mednyánszky (Kingdom of Hungary) Sipos	21	21	21
(Germany) Seifert (Germany) Gonschorek	14	7	13
(Austria) Kolbe (Austria) Neumann	19	21	21	18	21
(Czechoslovakia) Masáková (Germany) Krebsbach	21	8	9	21	18
(Germany) Rüster (Germany) Stettiner	19	21	12	13
(Kingdom of Hungary) Gál (Kingdom of Hungary) Komáromi	21	15	21	21
(Germany) Kurz (Germany) Herz	12	12	19
(Austria) Wildam (Austria) Reitzer	21	21	21

Semifinals
(Kingdom of Hungary) Mednyánszky (Kingdom of Hungary) Sipos	21	21	21
(Austria) Kolbe (Austria) Neumann	12	13	18
(Kingdom of Hungary) Gál (Kingdom of Hungary) Komáromi	21	21	21
(Austria) Wildam (Austria) Reitzer	10	13	18

Final
(Kingdom of Hungary) Mednyánszky (Kingdom of Hungary) Sipos	21	21	21
(Kingdom of Hungary) Gál (Kingdom of Hungary) Komáromi	12	12	19

== See also ==
List of World Table Tennis Championships medalists
