= 1931 World Table Tennis Championships – Women's doubles =

1931 Women's doubles
- Location: Budapest

The 1931 World Table Tennis Championships women's doubles was the fourth edition of the women's doubles championship. Mária Mednyánszky and Anna Sipos defeated Magda Gál and Lili Tiszai in the final by three sets to one.

== Results ==
Quarterfinals
(Kingdom of Hungary) Mária Mednyánszky (Kingdom of Hungary) Anna Sipos
bye
(Austria) Lili Forbath (Austria) Helly Reitzer	21	21	17	18	21
(Germany) Astrid Krebsbach (Germany) Erika Stettiner	17	17	21	21	13
(Kingdom of Hungary) Magda Gál (Kingdom of Hungary) Lili Tiszai	21	21	21
(Romania) Banhidy (Romania) Szelenszky	8	12	3
(Czechoslovakia) Marie Šmídová (Germany) Mona Rüster
(Kingdom of Hungary) Emilné Rácz (Kingdom of Hungary) Márta Komáromi

Semifinals
(Kingdom of Hungary) Mednyánszky (Kingdom of Hungary) Sipos	21	19	21	21
(Austria) Forbath (Austria) Reitzer	8	21	17	13
(Kingdom of Hungary) Gál (Kingdom of Hungary) Tiszai	16	21	13	21	21
(Czechoslovakia) Šmídová (Germany) Rüster	21	19	21	8	13

Final
(Kingdom of Hungary) Mednyánszky (Kingdom of Hungary) Sipos	21	19	21	21
(Kingdom of Hungary) Gál (Kingdom of Hungary) Tiszai	8	21	17	13

== See also ==
List of World Table Tennis Championships medalists
