= 1929 World Table Tennis Championships – Men's team =

1929 Swaythling Cup (men's team)

The 1929 World Table Tennis Championships – Swaythling Cup (men's team) was the third edition of the men's team championship.

Hungary won the gold medal following a perfect 9-0 match record.

== Swaythling Cup final table ==
Pos	Team	P	W	L	Squad
1	(Kingdom of Hungary) Hungary	9	9	0	Viktor Barna, Sándor Glancz, István Kelen, Zoltán Mechlovits, Miklós Szabados
2	Austria	9	8	1	Manfred Feher, Paul Flussmann, Erwin Kohn, Alfred Liebster, Robert Thum
3	England	9	7	2	Charlie Bull, Frank Burls, Adrian Haydon, Fred Perry, Frank Wilde
4	Latvia	9	6	3	Mordecai Finberg, Arnold Oschin, Rosenthal, A. Stauer
5	Czechoslovakia	9	5	4	Josef Bergman, Mikuláš Fried, Bohumil Hájek, Antonín Maleček, Bedřich Nikodém
6	Germany	9	3	6	Herbert Caro, Heribert Haensch, Hans-Georg Lindenstaedt, E. Mayer, Friedrich Starke
6	Romania	9	3	6	C. Albert, Fogel, Janos Ponta, A. Steiner
6	Wales	9	3	6	Appleby, Herbert Geen, T. Hilborn, Cyril Mossford
9	(Socialist Federal Republic of Yugoslavia) Yugoslavia	9	1	8	Karlo Klauber, Milorad Konjović, Geza Legenstein, Đorđe Roth, Borivoje Stanković
10	Lithuania	9	0	9	Arturas Amonas, Isakas Lipsicas, Choné Simensas

== See also ==
List of World Table Tennis Championships medalists
