= 1931 World Table Tennis Championships – Women's singles =

1931 Women's singles
- Location: Budapest

The 1931 World Table Tennis Championships women's singles was the fifth edition of the women's singles championship. Mária Mednyánszky defeated Mona Müller-Rüster in the final by three sets to one, to secure a fifth consecutive title.

== Draw ==
=== Key ===
- Q = Qualifier
- w/o = Walkover
- w/d = Withdraw
- r = Retired
- DQ = Disqualified

=== Finals ===
Round of 16
(Kingdom of Hungary) Mária Mednyánszky | 21 | 21 | 21
(Romania) Irma Papos | 7 | 12 | 11
(Austria) Helly Reitzer | 22 | 21 | 9 | 21
(Weimar Republic) Erika Stettiner | 20 | 10 | 21 | 14
(Czechoslovakia) Marie Šmídová | 21 | 21 | 21
(Romania) Szelenszky | 14 | 8 | 9
(Kingdom of Hungary) Magda Gál | 21 | 21 | 21
(Kingdom of Hungary) Klari Molnar | 13 | 12 | 10
(Kingdom of Hungary) Anna Sipos | 18 | 23 | 21 | 16 | 24
(Kingdom of Hungary) Márta Komáromi | 21 | 21 | 17 | 21 | 22
(Weimar Republic) Astrid Krebsbach | 21 | 21 | 21
(Kingdom of Hungary) Zala | 13 | 12 | 15
(Kingdom of Hungary) Emilné Rácz | 11 | 21 | 21 | 21
(Kingdom of Hungary) Lili Tiszai | 21 | 16 | 18 | 18
(Weimar Republic) Mona Müller-Rüster | 21 | 21 | 21
(Austria) Lili Forbath | 16 | 14 | 17

Quarterfinals
(Kingdom of Hungary) Mária Mednyánszky | 21 | 21 | 21
(Austria) Helly Reitzer | 11 | 14 | 10
(Czechoslovakia) Marie Šmídová | 6 | 10 | 19
(Kingdom of Hungary) Magda Gál | 21 | 21 | 21
(Kingdom of Hungary) Anna Sipos | 13 | 21 | 21 | 21
(Weimar Republic) Astrid Krebsbach | 21 | 17 | 16 | 18
(Kingdom of Hungary) Emilné Rácz | 21 | 18 | 11 | 21
(Weimar Republic) Mona Müller-Rüster | 18 | 21 | 21 | 23

Semifinals
(Kingdom of Hungary) Mária Mednyánszky | 21 | 21 | 21 | 21
(Kingdom of Hungary) Magda Gál | 11 | 23 | 13 | 7
(Kingdom of Hungary) Anna Sipos | 17 | 15 | 21 | 19
(Weimar Republic) Mona Müller-Rüster | 21 | 21 | 10 | 21

Final
(Kingdom of Hungary) Mária Mednyánszky | 21 | 16 | 21 | 21
(Weimar Republic) Mona Müller-Rüster | 8 | 21 | 8 | 13

== See also ==
List of World Table Tennis Championships medalists
