= 1929 World Table Tennis Championships – Men's singles =

1929 Men's singles

The 1929 World Table Tennis Championships men's singles was the third edition of the men's singles championship.

Fred Perry met Miklós Szabados in the final of this event. Perry won 14–21, 21–12, 23–21, 21–19.

== Draw ==
=== Key ===
- Q = Qualifier
- w/o = Walkover
- w/d = Withdraw
- r = Retired
- DQ = Disqualified

=== Finals ===
Round of 16
(England) Fred Perry	21	21	21
(Austria) Alfred Liebster	18	9	12
(Czechoslovakia) Antonín Maleček	18	18	13
(Kingdom of Hungary) István Kelen	21	21	21
(Austria) Erwin Kohn	21	21	21	21
(Kingdom of Hungary) Sándor Glancz	14	23	19	19
(Kingdom of Hungary) Victor Barna	13	23	21	19	15
(England) Adrian Haydon	21	21	7	21	21
(Kingdom of Hungary) Zoltán Mechlovits	21	21	21
(Latvia) Arnold Oschin	10	14	13
(England) Charles Bull	17	3	16
(Austria) Robert Thum	21	21	21
(Kingdom of Hungary) Ernő Földi	21	21	21	17	21
(Austria) Paul Flussmann	15	23	11	21	19
(England) Frank Wilde	13	17	14
(Kingdom of Hungary) Miklós Szabados	21	21	21

Quarterfinals
(England) Fred Perry	21	21	21
(Kingdom of Hungary) István Kelen	9	13	14
(Austria) Erwin Kohn	12	8	8
(England) Adrian Haydon	21	21	21
(Kingdom of Hungary) Zoltán Mechlovits	21	21	21
(Austria) Robert Thum	19	17	11
(Kingdom of Hungary) Ernő Földi	10	9	20
(Kingdom of Hungary) Miklós Szabados	21	21	22

Semifinals
(England) Fred Perry	21	21	21
(England) Adrian Haydon	8	19	18
(Kingdom of Hungary) Zoltán Mechlovits	18	24	24	17	13
(Kingdom of Hungary) Miklós Szabados	21	22	22	21	21

Final
(England) Fred Perry	14	21	23	21
(Kingdom of Hungary) Miklós Szabados	21	12	21	19
