= 1934 World Table Tennis Championships – Men's doubles =

1934 Men's doubles (held in December 1933)

The 1934 World Table Tennis Championships men's doubles was the eighth edition of the men's doubles championship. The Championships were held in December 1933 but are officially listed as the 1934 Championships. Miklós Szabados and Viktor Barna defeated Sándor Glancz and Tibor Házi in the final by three sets to nil. Barna once again playing with Szabados, won his sixth consecutive doubles title.

== Results ==
Round of 16
(Kingdom of Hungary) Miklós Szabados (Kingdom of Hungary) Viktor Barna	3
(Socialist Federal Republic of Yugoslavia) Stevica Maksimovic (Socialist Federal Republic of Yugoslavia) Ladislav Hexner	2
(England) Ken Hyde (England) Andrew Millar	3
(France) Charles Dubouillé (Lithuania) Michel Glickmann	2
(Latvia) Mordecai Finberg (Latvia) Arnold Oschin	3
(France) Hhenri Ozenne (France) Henri Bolelli	2
(Kingdom of Hungary) Béla Nyitrai (Kingdom of Hungary) István Boros	3
(Austria) Erwin Kohn (Austria) Alfred Liebster	1
(Czechoslovakia) Miloslav Hamr (Czechoslovakia) Erwin Koln-Korda	3
(France) Leonard Gordon (France) Raymond Furman	0
(Switzerland) Heinz Nickelsburg (Switzerland) Pierre Vergain	1
(France) Raymond Verger (France) Roger Worth	3
(Kingdom of Hungary) Lajos Dávid (Kingdom of Hungary) Laszlo Bellak	3
(England) Don Foulis (England) Eric Findon	1
(India) Jimmy Dass (India) Wishnu Kirloskar	0
(Kingdom of Hungary) Sándor Glancz (Kingdom of Hungary) Tibor Házi	3

Quarterfinals
(Kingdom of Hungary) Szabados (Kingdom of Hungary) Barna	3
(England) Hyde (England) Millar	0
(Latvia) Finberg (Latvia) Oschin	0
(Kingdom of Hungary) Nyitrai (Kingdom of Hungary) Boros	3
(Czechoslovakia) Hamr (Czechoslovakia) Koln-Korda	3
(France) Verger (France) Worth	0
(Kingdom of Hungary) Dávid (Kingdom of Hungary) Bellak	1
(Kingdom of Hungary) Glancz (Kingdom of Hungary) Házi	3

Semifinals
(Kingdom of Hungary) Szabados (Kingdom of Hungary) Barna	3
(Kingdom of Hungary) Nyitrai (Kingdom of Hungary) Boros	1
(Czechoslovakia) Hamr (Czechoslovakia) Koln-Korda	1
(Kingdom of Hungary) Glancz (Kingdom of Hungary) Házi	3

Final
(Kingdom of Hungary) Szabados (Kingdom of Hungary) Barna	21	21	21
(Kingdom of Hungary) Glancz (Kingdom of Hungary) Házi	11	18	15

== See also ==
List of World Table Tennis Championships medalists
