= 1934 World Table Tennis Championships – Men's singles =

1934 Men's singles (held in December 1933)

The 1934 World Table Tennis Championships men's singles was the eighth edition of the men's singles championship. The Championships were held in December 1933 but are officially listed as the 1934 Championships.

Viktor Barna defeated Laszlo Bellak in the final, winning three sets to two to secure a third consecutive title.

== Results ==
These are the results:

Round of 16
(Kingdom of Hungary) Viktor Barna	21	21	21
(Latvia) Arnold Oschin	16	11	19
(Czechoslovakia) Oldrich Blecha	21	21	21
(Poland) Simon Pohoryles	15	14	?
(Kingdom of Hungary) Tibor Házi	22	16	?	21
(England) Eric Findon	20	21	?	16
(Kingdom of Hungary) Lajos Dávid	21	15	21	21
(Kingdom of Hungary) István Boros	13	21	16	19
(Kingdom of Hungary) Miklós Szabados	21	21	22	21
(Austria) Erwin Kohn	17	17	24	15
(Poland) Alojzy Ehrlich	19	21	23	21
(England) Andrew Millar	21	13	21	19
(Kingdom of Hungary) Laszlo Bellak	21	21	19	21
(Czechoslovakia) Stanislav Kolář	10	12	21	15
(Kingdom of Hungary) Sándor Glancz	21	21	21
(England) Ken Hyde	18	17	16

Quarterfinals
(Kingdom of Hungary) Barna	21	21	21
(Czechoslovakia) Blecha	10	19	17
(Kingdom of Hungary) Házi	16	17	21	22	21
(Kingdom of Hungary) Dávid	21	21	16	20	14
(Kingdom of Hungary) Szabados	21	9	17	21	12
(Poland) Erlich	11	21	21	16	13
(Kingdom of Hungary) Bellak	21	21	21
(Kingdom of Hungary) Glanz	8	18	19

Semifinals
(Kingdom of Hungary) Barna	21	21	21	23
(Kingdom of Hungary) Házi	16	17	23	21
(Kingdom of Hungary) Szabados	19	21	19	28	15
(Kingdom of Hungary) Bellak	21	15	21	26	21

Final
(Kingdom of Hungary) Barna	12	21	15	21	21
(Kingdom of Hungary) Bellak	21	14	21	5	14
