= 1930 World Table Tennis Championships – Women's singles =

1930 Women's singles
- Location: Berlin

The 1930 World Table Tennis Championships women's singles was the fourth edition of the women's singles championship. Mária Mednyánszky met her compatriot Anna Sipos in the final of this event winning 21–18, 21–15, 21–23, 10–21, 21–15 to secure fourth consecutive title.

== Draw ==
=== Key ===
- Q = Qualifier
- w/o = Walkover
- w/d = Withdraw
- r = Retired
- DQ = Disqualified

=== Finals ===
Round of 16
(Kingdom of Hungary) Mária Mednyánszky	21	21	21
(Weimar Republic) Lilli Marie Peiser	18	15	19
(Weimar Republic) Anita Felguth	9	22	15
(Weimar Republic) Kuhlmann	21	24	21
(Czechoslovakia) Marie Masáková	21	21	21
(Weimar Republic) Deutelmose	4	13	18
(Weimar Republic) Ingeborg Carnatz	21	21	19	15	19
(Austria) Josefine Kolbe	18	12	21	21	21
(Austria) Gertrude Wildam	W/O
(Weimar Republic) J. Henschel
(Weimar Republic) Herz	21	13	11	8
(Weimar Republic) Mona Rüster	18	21	21	21
(Weimar Republic) Astrid Krebsbach	21	21	21
(Austria) Helly Reitzer	13	17	4
(Weimar Republic) Erika Stettiner	18	19	21	16
(Kingdom of Hungary) Anna Sipos	21	21	12	21

Quarterfinals
(Kingdom of Hungary) Mária Mednyánszky	21	21	21
(Weimar Republic) Kuhlmann	11	10	11
(Czechoslovakia) Marie Masáková	14	12	15
(Austria) Josefine Kolbe	21	21	21
(Austria) Gertrude Wildham	21	21	21
(Weimar Republic) Mona Rüster	16	11	19
(Weimar Republic) Astrid Krebsbach	15	17	21	21
(Kingdom of Hungary) Anna Sipos	21	21	13	23

Semifinals
(Kingdom of Hungary) Mária Mednyánszky	21	21	17	21
(Austria) Josefine Kolbe	14	16	21	16
(Austria) Gertrude Wildham	6	18	17
(Kingdom of Hungary) Anna Sipos	21	21	21

Final
(Kingdom of Hungary) Mária Mednyánszky	21	21	21	10	21
(Kingdom of Hungary) Anna Sipos	18	15	23	21	15

== See also ==
List of World Table Tennis Championships medalists
