= 1933 World Table Tennis Championships – Men's singles =

1933 Men's singles

The 1933 World Table Tennis Championships men's singles was the seventh edition of the men's singles championship.

Viktor Barna defeated Stanislav Kolář in the final, winning three sets to one.

== Results ==
Round of 16
(Hungary) Viktor Barna	21	21	21
(Latvia) I. Schatzow	12	15	12
(Czechoslovakia) Miloslav Hamr	7	11	12
(Czechoslovakia) Karel Svoboda	21	21	21
(Hungary) Sándor Glancz	21	22	21	21
(Socialist Federal Republic of Yugoslavia) Ladislav Hexner	18	24	19	16
(Austria) Erwin Kohn	21	21	21
(Hungary) Ernő Földi	6	10	14
(Hungary) István Kelen	17	21	16	22	21
(Czechoslovakia) Stanislav Kolář	21	19	21	20	9
(Czechoslovakia) Michael Grobauer	15	23	23	21
(Hungary) István Boros	21	21	21	12
(Czechoslovakia) Erwin Koln-Korda	12	21	21	21
(Austria) Paul Flussmann	21	19	15	14
(England) Adrian Haydon	24	21	18	21
(Hungary) Lajos Dávid	22	18	21	14

Quarterfinals
(Hungary) Barna	21	21	21
(Czechoslovakia) Svoboda	10	16	18
(Hungary) Glancz	21	21	11	21
(Austria) Kohn	8	12	21	17
(Czechoslovakia) Kolář	21	21	21
(Czechoslovakia) Grobauer	9	16	6
(Czechoslovakia) Kohn	19	21	11	8
(England) Haydon	21	16	21	21

Semifinals
(Hungary) Barna	21	21	21
(Hungary) Glancz	12	9	16
(Czechoslovakia) Kolář	21	14	21
(England) Haydon	11	18	18

Final
(Hungary) Barna	21	11	21	21
(Czechoslovakia) Kolář	15	21	17	18
