= 1929 World Table Tennis Championships =

The 3rd World Table Tennis Championships were held in Budapest from January 14 to January 21, 1929.

== Medalists ==
=== Team ===
Event	Gold	Silver	Bronze
Swaythling Cup (Men's team)	Hungary; Viktor Barna; Sándor Glancz; István Kelen; Zoltán Mechlovits; Miklós Szabados	Austria; Manfred Feher; Paul Flussmann; Erwin Kohn; Alfred Liebster; Robert Thum	England; Charles Bull; Frank Burls; Adrian Haydon; Fred Perry; Frank Wilde

=== Individual ===
Event	Gold	Silver	Bronze
Men's singles	(England) Fred Perry	(Kingdom of Hungary) Miklós Szabados	(England) Adrian Haydon
Men's singles	(England) Fred Perry	(Kingdom of Hungary) Miklós Szabados	(Kingdom of Hungary) Zoltán Mechlovits
Women's singles	(Kingdom of Hungary) Mária Mednyánszky	(Austria) Gertrude Wildam	(Kingdom of Hungary) Anna Sipos
Women's singles	(Kingdom of Hungary) Mária Mednyánszky	(Austria) Gertrude Wildam	(Kingdom of Hungary) Magda Gál
Men's doubles	(Kingdom of Hungary) Viktor Barna (Kingdom of Hungary) Miklós Szabados	(Kingdom of Hungary) Laszlo Bellak (Kingdom of Hungary) Sándor Glancz	(Kingdom of Hungary) György Szegedi (Kingdom of Hungary) István Reti
Men's doubles	(Kingdom of Hungary) Viktor Barna (Kingdom of Hungary) Miklós Szabados	(Kingdom of Hungary) Laszlo Bellak (Kingdom of Hungary) Sándor Glancz	(England) Charles Bull (England) Fred Perry
Women's doubles	(Weimar Republic) Erika Metzger (Weimar Republic) Mona Rüster	(Austria) Fanchette Flamm (Austria) Gertrude Wildam	(Kingdom of Hungary) Mária Mednyánszky (Kingdom of Hungary) Anna Sipos
Women's doubles	(Weimar Republic) Erika Metzger (Weimar Republic) Mona Rüster	(Austria) Fanchette Flamm (Austria) Gertrude Wildam	(Kingdom of Hungary) Ilona Zádor (Kingdom of Hungary) Magda Gál
Mixed doubles	(Kingdom of Hungary) István Kelen (Kingdom of Hungary) Anna Sipos	(Kingdom of Hungary) Laszlo Bellak (Kingdom of Hungary) Magda Gál	(Austria) Alfred Liebster (Austria) Gertrude Wildam
Mixed doubles	(Kingdom of Hungary) István Kelen (Kingdom of Hungary) Anna Sipos	(Kingdom of Hungary) Laszlo Bellak (Kingdom of Hungary) Magda Gál	(Kingdom of Hungary) Zoltán Mechlovits (Kingdom of Hungary) Mária Mednyánszky
