= 1935 World Table Tennis Championships – Men's doubles =

1935 Men's doubles

The 1935 World Table Tennis Championships men's doubles was the ninth edition of the men's doubles championship. Miklós Szabados and Viktor Barna defeated Alfred Liebster and Adrian Haydon in the final by three sets to nil. Barna won his seventh consecutive doubles title and Szabados his sixth from the last seven.

== Results ==
Round of 16
(England) Joe Silto (England) H. Shalson	3
(Wales) Ron Baglow (Wales) F E Wynne	1
(Kingdom of Hungary) István Kelen (Kingdom of Hungary) Laszlo Bellak	3
(Lithuania) Juozas Remeikis (Lithuania) Eugenijus Nikolskis	1
(England) David Jones (England) Tommy Sears	1
(Kingdom of Hungary) Tibor Házi (United States) Jimmy McClure	3
(Kingdom of Hungary) Miklós Szabados (Kingdom of Hungary) Viktor Barna	3
(France) Raymond Verger (France) Michel Haguenauer	1
(Austria) Alfred Liebster (England) Adrian Haydon	3
(England) Arthur Wilmott (England) C.G. Milton	0
(Socialist Federal Republic of Yugoslavia) Aleksandr Meyer (Socialist Federal Republic of Yugoslavia) Ladislav Hexner	3
(India) Jimmy Dass (India) A Guha	2
(England) Ken Hyde (England) Andrew Millar	0
(France) Daniel Guérin (France) Raoul Bedoc	3
(Republic of Ireland) Dermot Hennessey (Republic of Ireland) Cyril Kemp	w/o

Quarterfinals
(England) Silto (England) Shalson	3
(Kingdom of Hungary) Kelen (Kingdom of Hungary) Bellak	3
(Kingdom of Hungary) Házi (United States) McClure	1
(Kingdom of Hungary) Szabados (Kingdom of Hungary) Barna	3
(Austria) Liebster (England) Haydon	3
(Socialist Federal Republic of Yugoslavia) Meyer (Socialist Federal Republic of Yugoslavia) Hexner	0
(France) Geuerin (France) Bedoc	3
(Republic of Ireland) Hennessey (Republic of Ireland) Kemp	1

Semifinals
(Kingdom of Hungary) Kelen (Kingdom of Hungary) Bellak	16	18	25	21	18
(Kingdom of Hungary) Szabados (Kingdom of Hungary) Barna	21	21	23	18	21
(Austria) Liebster (England) Haydon	22	21	21
(France) Geuerin (France) Bedoc	20	14	15

Final
(Kingdom of Hungary) Szabados (Kingdom of Hungary) Barna	21	21	21
(Austria) Liebster (England) Haydon	13	6	8

== See also ==
List of World Table Tennis Championships medalists
