= Kārlis Paegle =

Latvian ice hockey player and footballer

- Born: 4 October 1911 Riga, Governorate of Livonia, Russian Empire
- Died: 23 December 1997 (aged 86) Fagersta, Västmanland, Sweden
- Position: Defence
- Played for: Rīgas RFK; HK ASK Rīga; Dinamo Riga; Rīgas Sporta klubs
- National team: Latvia
- Playing career: 1931–1942

Kārlis Paegle (4 October 1911 – 23 December 1997) was a Latvian sportsman. He was active in ice hockey, table tennis, tennis and football. In ice hockey he was a defenceman who played for Rīgas RFK, HK ASK Rīga, Dinamo Riga, and Rīgas Sporta klubs. Paegle also played for the Latvia national team at the 1936 Winter Olympics and three World Championships.

In football he made one appearance for the Latvia national team in 1931 against Finland.

In table tennis he took part in the team competition at the 1930 and 1931 World Table Tennis Championships.

In tennis he was ranked as one of the top three players in Latvia.
