= Christopher Kelen =

Australian writer and poet (born 1958)

Christopher Kelen FRSN
- Born: 17 December 1958 (age 67); Sydney, New South Wales, Australia
- Education: University of Sydney; University of Western Sydney
- Relatives: István Kelen (father)
- Writing career
- Pen name: Kit Kelen
- Website: kitkelen.com

Christopher "Kit" Kelen (born 17 December 1958 in Sydney) is an Australian academic, writer, and artist. He is the younger son of Hungarian-born writer Stephen Kelen.

Kelen is the author of fourteen volumes of poetry and two novels. He has been published widely since the mid-1970s and in 1988 won an ABA/ABC bicentennial award with his poem "Views from Pinchgut".

In 1992, "The Naming of the Harbour and the Trees" won an Anne Elder Award. Kelen was Writer-in-Residence for the Australia Council at the B. R. Whiting Library in Rome in 1996.

For many years, Kelen taught Creative Writing and Literature at the University of Macau. As of 2018, he lived mainly on Worimi country on the NSW north coast.

Kelen has published several book-length scholarly works about poetry, including Poetry, Consciousness and Community (2009), City of Poets (2009), Anthem Quality (2014) and Children, Animals and Poetry - Poetics and Ethics of Anthropomorphism (2022).

Kelen was elected a Fellow of the Royal Society of New South Wales in 2019. In 2024, he won the Newcastle Poetry Prize.

== Bibliography ==
Poetry

- The Naming of the Harbour and the Trees (1992)
- Green Lizard Manifesto (1997)
- Möbius (1998)
- Republics (2000)
- New Territories (2003)
- Eight Days in Lhasa (2006)
- A Map of the Seasons (2006)
- Dredging the Delta (2007)
- After Meng Jiao (2008)
- China Years (2011)
- Pictures of Nothing at All (2014)
- Scavengers' Season (2014)
- As to the Ladders of Whichway (2015)
- A Pocket Kit (2) (2015)
- Poor Man's Coat (2018)
- Book of Mother (2022)
- Bung Mazes (2022)

Novels

- Punk's Travels (1980)
- A Wager with the Gods (2006)
