= Tommy Sears =

English table tennis player (1911–1975)

Personal information
- Full name: Thomas Eagar Sears
- Nationality: England
- Born: 13 March 1911 Dublin, Ireland
- Died: 6 December 1975 (aged 64) Swindon, England
Medal record
Representing England
World Table Tennis Championships
Silver medal – second place	1931	Men's Team

Thomas Eagar Sears (13 March 1911 – 6 December 1975), was a male English international table tennis player.

== Table tennis career ==
He won a silver medal in the men's team event at the 1931 World Table Tennis Championships. He also won two English Open titles and captained England.

== Personal life ==
Sears was a warehouse manager at W.H Smith Supply Centre from 1926 to 1973. He was also a Japanese prisoner of war.

== See also ==
- List of England players at the World Team Table Tennis Championships
- List of World Table Tennis Championships medalists
