= Lili Tiszai =

Hungarian table tennis player

Lili Tiszai (Tenner)
Personal information
- Nationality: Hungary
Medal record
Representing Hungary
World Table Tennis Championships
Silver medal – second place	1931	Women's doubles

Lily Tiszai was a female international table tennis player from Hungary.

She won a silver medal at the 1931 World Table Tennis Championships in the women's doubles with Magda Gál.

== See also ==
- List of table tennis players
- List of World Table Tennis Championships medalists
