= IIona Zádor =

Hungarian table tennis player

Ilona Zádor
Personal information
- Nationality: Hungary
Medal record
Representing Hungary
World Table Tennis Championships
Bronze medal – third place	1929	Women's doubles

Ilona Zádor was a Hungarian international table tennis player.

== Table tennis career ==
Zádor won a bronze medal at the 1929 World Table Tennis Championships in the women's doubles with Magda Gál.

== Personal life ==
Zádor was of Jewish descent.

== See also ==
- List of table tennis players
- List of World Table Tennis Championships medalists
