= Viktor Barna =

Table tennis player (1911–1972)

Personal information
- Nationality: Hungarian, English
- Born: Győző Braun; 24 August 1911 Budapest, Austria-Hungary
- Died: 27 February 1972 (aged 60) Lima, Peru

Sport
- Sport: Table tennis
Medal record
Men's table tennis
Representing Hungary
World Championships
Gold medal – first place	1929 Budapest	Doubles
Gold medal – first place	1929 Budapest	Team
Gold medal – first place	1930 Berlin	Singles
Gold medal – first place	1930 Berlin	Doubles
Gold medal – first place	1930 Berlin	Team
Gold medal – first place	1931 Budapest	Doubles
Gold medal – first place	1931 Budapest	Team
Gold medal – first place	1932 Prague	Singles
Gold medal – first place	1932 Prague	Doubles
Gold medal – first place	1932 Prague	Mixed doubles
Gold medal – first place	1933 Baden	Singles
Gold medal – first place	1933 Baden	Doubles
Gold medal – first place	1933 Baden	Team
Gold medal – first place	1934 Paris	Singles
Gold medal – first place	1934 Paris	Doubles
Gold medal – first place	1934 Paris	Team
Gold medal – first place	1935 Wembley	Singles
Gold medal – first place	1935 Wembley	Doubles
Gold medal – first place	1935 Wembley	Mixed doubles
Gold medal – first place	1935 Wembley	Team
Gold medal – first place	1938 Wembley	Team
Silver medal – second place	1931 Budapest	Singles
Silver medal – second place	1931 Budapest	Mixed doubles
Silver medal – second place	1932 Prague	Team
Silver medal – second place	1934 Paris	Mixed doubles
Silver medal – second place	1937 Baden	Team
Silver medal – second place	1938 Wembley	Doubles
Bronze medal – third place	1930 Berlin	Mixed doubles
Bronze medal – third place	1933 Baden	Mixed doubles
Bronze medal – third place	1936 Prague	Team
Bronze medal – third place	1938 Wembley	Singles
Representing England
World Championships
Gold medal – first place	1939 Cairo	Doubles
Silver medal – second place	1954 Wembley	Doubles
Bronze medal – third place	1947 Paris	Doubles
Bronze medal – third place	1947 Paris	Mixed doubles
Bronze medal – third place	1948 Wembley	Doubles
Bronze medal – third place	1949 Stockholm	Team
Bronze medal – third place	1952 Bombay	Doubles
Bronze medal – third place	1952 Bombay	Mixed doubles
Bronze medal – third place	1953 Bucharest	Doubles
Bronze medal – third place	1954 Wembley	Mixed doubles

Viktor Győző Barna (born Győző Braun; 24 August 1911 – 27 February 1972) was a Hungarian and British champion table tennis player as well as a record five times singles World Champion.

He won 41 World Championship medals (including 22 gold medals) and also won 20 English Open titles.

== Personal life ==
Barna's birth name was Győző Braun, but because of anti-Semitism in Hungary at the time, he changed his name to a Hungarian-sounding name. In September 1939, during the outbreak of the Second World War, he and his wife were in America. Barna returned to Europe, in order to fight against the Nazis. He joined the British Army as a parachutist, and fought in Yugoslavia. After the British withdrew from Yugoslavia, Barna remained in England. After the war he settled with his wife in London. He became a British national in 1952. Later he became a representative for the Dunlop Sports Company and continued travelling the world in this capacity. It was during one of these tours in 1972 that he succumbed to a heart attack in Lima, Peru.

His brother Tibor Barna was the 1940 Hungarian table tennis national champion.

== Writing ==
In 1957, he published the book How to Win at Table Tennis (London: Pitman) ISBN 978-0-273-41699-9. Then, in 1962, he published the book Table Tennis Today (London: Arthur Barker) and in 1971 Your Book of Table Tennis ISBN 978-0-571-09345-8.

== Legacy ==
Barna, who was Jewish, was inducted into the International Jewish Sports Hall of Fame in 1981.

Barna was inducted into the International Table Tennis Foundation Hall of Fame in 1993.

== See also ==
- List of select Jewish table tennis players
- List of World Table Tennis Championships medalists
- List of England players at the World Team Table Tennis Championships
