= Frank Burls =

English table tennis player (1902–1976)

Personal information
- Nationality: England
- Born: 7 March 1902 London, England
- Died: 1976 (aged 73–74) London, England
Medal record
Representing England
World Table Tennis Championships
Bronze medal – third place	1926	Men's Team
Bronze medal – third place	1929	Men's Team

Frank John Burls (7 March 1902 – 1976), was a male English international table tennis player.

He won two bronze medals at the 1926 World Table Tennis Championships and the 1929 World Table Tennis Championships in the men's team event.

He was a civil servant by trade and won the 1926 Civil Service Championship and finished runner-up in the 1926 Kent Championship.

== See also ==
- List of England players at the World Team Table Tennis Championships
- List of World Table Tennis Championships medalists
