= Márta Komáromi =

Hungarian table tennis player

Personal information
- Nationality: Hungary
Medal record
Representing Hungary
World Table Tennis Championships
Silver medal – second place	1930	Women's doubles
Bronze medal – third place	1931	Mixed doubles

Márta Komáromi was a female Hungarian international table tennis player.

== Table tennis career ==
She won a silver at the 1930 World Table Tennis Championships in the women's doubles with Magda Gál and the following year won a bronze medal at the 1931 World Table Tennis Championships in the mixed doubles with Laszlo Bellak.

== See also ==
- List of table tennis players
- List of World Table Tennis Championships medalists
