= Karel Svoboda (table tennis) =

Czech table tennis player

Personal information
- Nationality: Czech Republic
- Born: 6 July 1913 Brno, Moravia, Austria-Hungary
- Died: 3 March 1943 (aged 29) Frankfurt, Nazi Germany

Sport
- Sport: Table tennis
Medal record
Representing Czechoslovakia
World Table Tennis Championships
Bronze medal – third place	1931	Men's Doubles
Silver medal – second place	1931	Men's Team
Silver medal – second place	1933	Men's Team
Silver medal – second place	1933	Men's Team
Silver medal – second place	1935	Men's Team

Karel Svoboda (6 July 1913 – 3 March 1943) was a Czech table tennis player who won multiple medals at the World Table Tennis Championships. Svoboda was a member of Obrana národa, a Czech resistance organization, and was captured and executed by Nazi Germany. He received the Czechoslovak War Cross 1939 after his death.

== Biography ==
Karel Svoboda was born in Brno on 6 July 1913. His parents were Karel Svoboda and Josefa Svobodová (Berková) and he had one sister, Marie Svobodová. He represented Czechoslovakia in tennis and table tennis from 1931 through 1935. He won a bronze medal at the 1931 World Table Tennis Championships in the men's doubles with Jindřich Lauterbach. He also won four consecutive team event silver medals from 1931 to 1935. After his studies, Svoboda served with an artillery regiment in Olomouc and returned home in the fall of 1938. He looked for a job for a year, then worked for three months at the West Moravian Electric Power Plant.

In February 1940, Svoboda was arrested as a member of the Obrana národa resistance organization. He was imprisoned in Brno in the Kounice dormitories, and later in Wrocław, Wołów and Dietz. He was brought before the court at Frankfurt on 27 October 1942, along with his friend Richard Peřina. Svoboda was sentenced to death and was executed on 3 March 1943.

His remains, along with those of other executed people, was transported from Frankfurt to Brno and buried with military honors on 7 September 1967 at the Brno Central Cemetery. He received the Czechoslovak War Cross 1939 in memoriam.

== See also ==
- List of table tennis players
- List of World Table Tennis Championships medalists
