= Jindřich Lauterbach =

Czech table tennis player

Personal information
- Nationality: Czech Republic
Medal record
Representing Czechoslovakia
World Table Tennis Championships
Bronze medal – third place	1931	Men's Doubles
Silver medal – second place	1931	Men's Team
Gold medal – first place	1932	Men's Team

Jindřich Lauterbach was a male Czech international table tennis player.

== Table tennis career ==
He won a silver medal and bronze medal at the 1931 World Table Tennis Championships in the team event and in the men's doubles with Karel Svoboda respectively. The following year he won a gold medal in the team event at the 1932 World Table Tennis Championships for Czechoslovakia.

== See also ==
- List of table tennis players
- List of World Table Tennis Championships medalists
