= Gertrude Wildam =

Austrian table tennis player

Personal information
- Nationality: Austria
Medal record
Representing Austria
World Table Tennis Championships
| Bronze medal – third place | 1926 | Mixed doubles |
| Bronze medal – third place | 1929 | Mixed doubles |
| Silver medal – second place | 1929 | Women's singles |
| Silver medal – second place | 1929 | Women's doubles |
| Bronze medal – third place | 1930 | Women's singles |
| Bronze medal – third place | 1930 | Women's doubles |

Gertrude 'Trude' Wildam was a female Austrian international table tennis player.

She six World Table Tennis Championships medals; she won a bronze at the 1926 World Table Tennis Championships with Eduard Freudenheim, three years later at the 1929 World Table Tennis Championships she won another bronze in the mixed doubles with Alfred Liebster and two silver medals in the women's singles and doubles with Fanchette Flamm.

The final two bronze medals were won at the 1930 World Table Tennis Championships in the women's singles and doubles with Helly Reitzer.

== See also ==
- List of table tennis players
- List of World Table Tennis Championships medalists
