= Bedřich Nikodém =

Czech table tennis player (1909–1970)

Personal information
- Nationality: Czech
- Born: 12 August 1909 Vienna, Austria-Hungary
- Died: 19 July 1970 (aged 60) Prague, Czechoslovakia
Medal record
Representing Czechoslovakia
World Table Tennis Championships
Bronze medal – third place	1930	Men's Team
Silver medal – second place	1931	Men's Team
Gold medal – first place	1932	Men's Team

Bedřich Nikodém (also Friedrich Nikodem and Fritz Nikodem; 12 August 1909 – 19 July 1970) was a Czech international table tennis player, later active as a composer, lyricist and musician. He appeared in the 1930s under the pseudonym Niki Němec.

== Life ==
Nikodém was born in Vienna the son of an engineer. In 1921, the family moved to Brno, Czechoslovakia. According to his paternal wish, Friedrich Nikodem continued the family tradition and completed his engineering studies in Prague. His main interest, however, was sports and music.

At the end of the 1920s, Fritz Nikodem was one of the best table tennis players in the country and from 1929 to 1933 belonged to the Czech national team. He won a bronze medal at the 1930 World Table Tennis Championships and a silver medal at the 1931 World Table Tennis Championships in the team event. The following year in 1932 he won a gold medal in the team event at the 1932 World Table Tennis Championships for Czechoslovakia.

Afterwards Nikodém devoted himself entirely to music. During the Great Depression, he earned a living as a bar pianist. Under the pseudonym Niki Němec, he participated in recordings with various Dixieland dance orchestras. During this time, the first songs of his own gained popularity. In 1935, he began collaborating with the music publisher Mojmír Urbánek, who continued under the successor companies Orbis, Státní hudební vydavatelství and Supraphon.

In the 1940s, Nikodém dedicated himself primarily to swing music, and some of his songs from the 1950s became classics. In the 1960s, Nikodém's compositional work shifted to rock and roll. During this time he also worked as a scribe and editor, and promoted Karel Svoboda and the brothers Jiří Štaidl and Ladislav Štaidl. Nikodém succumbed to a heart attack in 1970.

The city of Ostrava honored Bedřich Nikodém in 1983 with the designation of a 2.3-kilometer-long road in the district of Poruba.

== Compositions and songs (selection) ==
- as Niki Němec: Music for the film Sňatková kancelář, 1932
- Mám malý stan
- Jen kytara a já
- Náš táborák
- Houpy, hou
- Dva modré balónky
- Je po dešti
- Nedělní vláček
- Flašinetář
- Znamínko na ramínku
- Barborka
- Start gemini
- Sedmikráska
- Poustevník

== See also ==
- List of table tennis players
- List of World Table Tennis Championships medalists
