= Lili Forbath =

Austrian table tennis player

Personal information
- Nationality: Austria
Medal record
Representing Austria
World Table Tennis Championships
Bronze medal – third place	1931	Women's doubles

Lily Forbath was a female Austrian international table tennis player.

She won a bronze medal at the 1931 World Table Tennis Championships in the women's doubles with Helly Reitzer.

== See also ==
- List of table tennis players
- List of World Table Tennis Championships medalists
