= Antonín Maleček =

Czech table tennis player

Personal information
- Nationality: Czech Republic
- Born: 1909
- Died: 14 September 1964 (aged 54–55)
Medal record
Representing Czechoslovakia
World Table Tennis Championships
Bronze medal – third place	1930	Men's Team
Silver medal – second place	1931	Men's Team
Gold medal – first place	1932	Men's Team

Antonín Maleček (1909 – 14 September 1964) was a Czechoslovak international table tennis player.

He won three medals at the World Table Tennis Championships in the team events. This culminated in a gold medal at the 1932 World Table Tennis Championships for Czechoslovakia.

He also won two English Open titles.

He kept a scrapbook on the history of Czech table tennis and died in 1964.

== See also ==
- List of table tennis players
- List of World Table Tennis Championships medalists
