= Stanley Proffitt =

English cricketer

Personal information
- Full name: Stanley Proffitt
- Born: 8 October 1910; Oldham, Lancashire, England
- Died: 3 January 1999 (aged 88); Middleton, Lancashire, England
- Batting: Left-handed
- Bowling: Slow left-arm orthodox

Domestic team information
- Years: Team
- 1937: Essex

Career statistics
Competition	First-class
Matches	7
Runs scored	170
Batting average	12.14
100s/50s	0/0
Top score	39
Balls bowled	54
Wickets	0
Bowling average	–
5 wickets in innings	–
10 wickets in match	–
Best bowling	–
Catches/stumpings	1/–
- Source: Cricinfo, 17 March 2012

Stanley Proffitt (8 October 1910 – 3 January 1999) was an English cricketer. Proffitt was a left-handed batsman who bowled slow left-arm orthodox. He was born at Oldham, Lancashire.

Despite being born in Lancashire, it was for Essex that he made his first-class debut for against Sussex in the 1937 County Championship. He made six further first-class appearances in that season, the last of which came against Gloucestershire. In his seven first-class matches, he scored 170 runs at a batting average of 12.14, with a high score of 39.

Outside of cricket, he represented England at table tennis. He died at Middleton, Lancashire, on 3 January 1999.

== See also ==
- List of England players at the World Team Table Tennis Championships
