= Helly Reitzer =

Austrian table tennis player

Personal information
- Nationality: Austria
Medal record
Representing Austria
World Table Tennis Championships
Bronze medal – third place	1930	Women's doubles
Bronze medal – third place	1931	Women's doubles

Helly Reitzer was a female Austrian international table tennis player.

She won two bronze medals; one at the 1930 World Table Tennis Championships in the women's doubles with Gertrude Wildam and one in the women's doubles with Lili Forbath at the 1931 World Table Tennis Championships.

== See also ==
- List of table tennis players
- List of World Table Tennis Championships medalists
