= Mona Rüster =

German table tennis player (1901–1976)

Personal information
- Full name: Mona Rüster
- Nationality: Germany
- Born: 10 August 1901
- Died: 13 January 1976 (aged 74)

Sport
- Sport: Table tennis
Medal record
Women's table tennis
Representing Germany
World Championships
Gold medal – first place	1934 Paris	Team
Silver medal – second place	1931 Budapest	Singles
Bronze medal – third place	1931 Budapest	Doubles
Gold medal – first place	1929 Budapest	Doubles

Mona Müller-Rüster (née Rüster, later Mueck; 10 August 1901 – 13 January 1976) was a German international table tennis player.

== Table tennis career ==
From 1929 to 1934, she won four medals in singles, doubles and team events in the World Table Tennis Championships.

The four World Championship medals included two gold medals in the doubles with Erika Metzger at the 1929 World Table Tennis Championships and team event at the 1933 World Table Tennis Championships.

== See also ==
- List of table tennis players
- List of World Table Tennis Championships medalists
