= István Boros =

Hungarian table tennis player

Personal information
- Nationality: Hungary
- Born: 20 April 1909
- Died: 15 April 1994 (aged 84)
Medal record
Representing Hungary
World Table Tennis Championships
| Bronze medal – third place | 1932 | Men's Singles |
| Bronze medal – third place | 1932 | Men's Doubles |
| Bronze medal – third place | 1933 | Men's Doubles |

István Boros (20 April 1909 – 15 April 1994) was a Hungarian international table tennis player who won two bronze medals at the 1932 World Table Tennis Championships in the men's singles and doubles with Tibor Házi and another doubles bronze with Béla Nyitrai at the 1933 World Table Tennis Championships. He was a national champion of Hungary and a Jew.

== See also ==
- List of table tennis players
- List of World Table Tennis Championships medalists
