= Magda Gál =

Hungarian table tennis player (1907–1990)

- Tibor Házi and Magda Házi playing table tennis with Eddie Pinner and Alice O’Connor, photographed by Gjon Mili for Life magazine, March 3, 1941.

Personal information
- Nationality: Hungary; United States
- Born: 1907 Szeged, Austria-Hungary
- Died: 1990 (aged 82–83) Bethesda, Maryland
Medal record
Representing Hungary
World Table Tennis Championships
Bronze medal – third place	1929	Women's singles
Bronze medal – third place	1929	Women's doubles
Silver medal – second place	1929	Mixed doubles
Bronze medal – third place	1930	Mixed doubles
Silver medal – second place	1930	Women's doubles
Bronze medal – third place	1931	Mixed doubles
Silver medal – second place	1931	Women's doubles
Bronze medal – third place	1931	Women's singles
Bronze medal – third place	1932	Mixed doubles
Bronze medal – third place	1932	Women's doubles
Bronze medal – third place	1932	Women's singles
Bronze medal – third place	1933	Women's singles
Silver medal – second place	1933	Women's doubles
Silver medal – second place	1933	Mixed doubles
Bronze medal – third place	1934	Women's singles
Bronze medal – third place	1934	Women's doubles
Silver medal – second place	1934	Women's team
Silver medal – second place	1935	Women's team
Silver medal – second place	1935	Women's singles
Bronze medal – third place	1936	Women's doubles

Magda Gál (married name Házi) (1907 – 1990), was a Hungarian international table tennis player.

== Table tennis career ==
She was a prolific World Table Tennis Championships medal winner and secured eight silver medals and twelve bronze medals from the 1929 World Table Tennis Championships to the 1936 World Table Tennis Championships.

Gál came short of a gold medal for two reasons; first the fact that with various doubles partners she was unable to overcome the six times world champion pairing of Mária Mednyánszky and Anna Sipos, and secondly the war effectively ended her chances to compete at world level. She did however continue to play in the United States. She also won two English Open titles.

== Personal life ==
Gál was born into a banking family in 1907 in the city Szeged. and was the only woman competitor on the table tennis team at the University of Szeged.

She married her fellow international player Tibor Házi in 1937, and in 1939, they fled to the United States to avoid capture by Nazi Germany because of their Jewish origins, and they settled in Bethesda, Maryland. She died in 1990 aged 83 and Házi died in 1999.

== See also ==
- List of table tennis players
- List of World Table Tennis Championships medalists
