= Manfred Feher =

Austrian table tennis player

Personal information
- Nationality: Austria
Medal record
Representing Austria
World Table Tennis Championships
Silver medal – second place	1929	Men's team
Bronze medal – third place	1931	Men's doubles
Bronze medal – third place	1932	Men's team
Bronze medal – third place	1933	Men's team
Bronze medal – third place	1933	Men's doubles

Manfred Feher was a male Austrian international table tennis player. He won a silver medal at the 1929 World Table Tennis Championships in the men's team. Two years later he won a men's doubles bronze medal with Alfred Liebster at the 1931 World Table Tennis Championships and in 1932 won another bronze in the men's team event at the 1932 World Table Tennis Championships. His final two bronze medals were won in the team event and the doubles with Liebster at the 1933 World Table Tennis Championships.

== See also ==
- List of table tennis players
- List of World Table Tennis Championships medalists
