= Nikita Madjaroglou =

German table tennis player

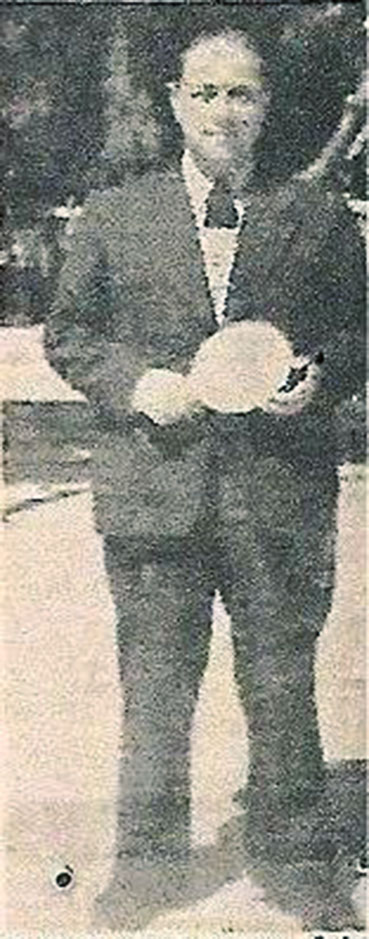

Personal information
- Nationality: Germany
- Born: 1912
- Died: 13 April 1950 (aged 37–38)

Sport
- Club: Athens Lawn Tennis Club
Medal record
Representing Germany
World Table Tennis Championships
Bronze medal – third place	1931	Men's Singles
Bronze medal – third place	1933	Mixed Doubles

Nikita Madjaroglou was a male German international table tennis player. He was an athlete of the Athens Lawn Tennis Club.

He won a bronze medal at the 1931 World Table Tennis Championships in the men's singles and two years later he won another bronze in the mixed doubles with Annemarie Schulz at the 1933 World Table Tennis Championships.

== See also ==
- List of table tennis players
- List of World Table Tennis Championships medalists
