= Lajos Dávid =

Hungarian table tennis player

Personal information
- Full name: Lajos Leopold Dávid
- Nationality: Hungary
- Born: 1913
- Died: 1944 (aged 30–31)

Sport
- Sport: Table tennis
Medal record
Men's table tennis
Representing Hungary
World Championships
Gold medal – first place	1934 Paris	Team
Silver medal – second place	1933 Baden	Doubles
Gold medal – first place	1933 Baden	Team
Silver medal – second place	1932 Prague	Team
Silver medal – second place	1931 Budapest	Doubles
Gold medal – first place	1931 Budapest	Team
Bronze medal – third place	1930 Berlin	Singles
Gold medal – first place	1930 Berlin	Team

Lajos Leopold Dávid was an international table tennis player from Hungary.

== Table tennis career ==
He won eight medals in singles, doubles, and team events in the World Table Tennis Championships in 1930 to 1934.

The eight World Championship medals included four gold medals in the team event for Hungary.

== See also ==
- List of table tennis players
- List of World Table Tennis Championships medalists
