= Erwin Kohn =

Austrian table tennis player

Personal information
- Full name: Kohn Erwin
- Nationality: Austria
- Born: 20 December 1911 Baden bei Wien
- Died: 18 March 1994 (aged 82) Mar del Plata

Sport
- Sport: Table tennis
Medal record
Men's table tennis
Representing Austria
World Championships
Gold medal – first place	1936 Prague	Team
Bronze medal – third place	1935 London	Singles
Bronze medal – third place	1935 London	Team
Silver medal – second place	1934 Paris	Team
Bronze medal – third place	1933 Baden	Doubles
Bronze medal – third place	1933 Baden	Team
Bronze medal – third place	1932 Prague	Singles
Bronze medal – third place	1932 Prague	Team
Silver medal – second place	1929 Budapest	Team

Erwin Kohn (20 December 1911, in Baden – 18 March 1994, in Mar del Plata) was a male international table tennis player from Austria.

== Table tennis career ==
Kohn was Austria's national table tennis champion by the age of 16. From 1932 to 1936 he won eight medals in singles, doubles, and team events in the World Table Tennis Championships.

The nine World Championship medals included a gold medal in the team event at the 1936 World Table Tennis Championships for Austria.

He won eight Argentinian national championships between 1940 and 1951.

== Personal life ==
He was of Jewish descent so fled to England in 1938 and then emigrated to Argentina.

== See also ==
- List of table tennis players
- List of World Table Tennis Championships medalists
