= Stephen Kelen =

Hungarian table tennis player

Personal information
- Full name: Stephen Estaban Kelen
- Nationality: Hungary
- Born: 21 March 1912 Budapest, Hungary
- Died: 1 May 2003 (aged 91) Sydney, Australia
- Education: Charles University in Prague

Sport
- Event: Table tennis
Medal record
Men's table tennis
Representing Hungary
World Championships
Gold medal – first place	1929 Budapest	Mixed Doubles
Gold medal – first place	1929 Budapest	Team
Gold medal – first place	1930 Berlin	Team
Gold medal – first place	1931 Budapest	Team
Gold medal – first place	1933 Baden	Mixed Doubles
Gold medal – first place	1933 Baden	Team
Gold medal – first place	1935 Wembley	Team
Silver medal – second place	1930 Berlin	Mixed Doubles
Silver medal – second place	1931 Budapest	Doubles
Silver medal – second place	1932 Prague	Team
Silver medal – second place	1933 Baden	Doubles
Silver medal – second place	1936 Prague	Mixed Doubles
Bronze medal – third place	1930 Berlin	Singles
Bronze medal – third place	1935 Wembley	Doubles
Bronze medal – third place	1936 Prague	Team

Stephen Estaban Kelen OAM (Hungarian: Kelen István; 21 March 1912 – 1 May 2003) was a Hungarian-Australian sportsman, journalist, author, and playwright. He won seven gold medals at the World Table Tennis Championships in the 1920s and 1930s. After moving to Australia in 1939 he had a long writing career in English.

== Early life ==
Kelen was born in Budapest in 1912. He studied philosophy at the Charles University in Prague, and later obtained a diploma from the British Association of Industrial Editors. He wrote professionally from the age of 17 and became fluent in Hungarian, Czech and English.

== Table tennis career ==
Between 1929 and 1936, Kelen won 15 medals in singles, doubles, and team events in the World Table Tennis Championships. This included seven gold medals: five in the team event and two in the mixed doubles with Anna Sipos at the 1929 World Table Tennis Championships and Mária Mednyánszky at the 1933 World Table Tennis Championships.

In the 1930s, Kelen was employed in Prague as a table tennis instructor by the Czech governing body. One of his students was world champion Stanislav Kolář. In 1936, he published Success at Table Tennis, a guide to the sport (1936: 1st edition. UK: Published by Frederick Warne & Co. Ltd).

== In Australia ==
In 1937, Kelen and Miklos Szabados embarked on a two-year table tennis exhibition tour of the Far East and South America. They won the doubles tournament at the Australian national championships, and Szabados defeated Kelen in the singles final. They both chose to settle in Australia permanently. In 1939, Kelen enlisted in the Australian Army. A member of the 66th Australian Infantry Battalion (Intelligence), he served in New Guinea, Halmahera, North Borneo, and finally as part of the British Commonwealth Occupation Force in Japan. He was a feature writer for the British Commonwealth Occupation Newspaper (BCON).

Back in Australia, Kelen worked for the Australian Broadcasting Corporation (ABC) as an author and journalist, writing documentaries and features. He later worked for Goodyear as a managing editor. He was president of the Sydney branch of PEN International (1975–1985), and a life member of the Australian Journalists Association. He won awards for short stories and plays that he authored. In 1983, he published an autobiography, I Remember Hiroshima.

== Personal life ==
Kelen is the father of academic Christopher Kelen and poet S. K. Kelen.

== See also ==
- List of table tennis players
- List of World Table Tennis Championships medalists
