= Anna Sipos =

Hungarian table tennis player

Personal information
- Full name: SIPOS Anna
- Nationality: Hungarian
- Born: 3 April 1908 Hungary
- Died: 1 January 1988 (aged 79)

Sport
- Sport: Table tennis
Medal record
Women's table tennis
Representing Hungary
World Championships
Gold medal – first place	1935 Wembley	Doubles
Gold medal – first place	1935 Wembley	Mixed Doubles
Silver medal – second place	1935 Wembley	Team
Gold medal – first place	1934 Paris	Doubles
Silver medal – second place	1934 Paris	Mixed Doubles
Silver medal – second place	1934 Paris	Team
Gold medal – first place	1933 Baden	Singles
Gold medal – first place	1933 Baden	Doubles
Bronze medal – third place	1933 Baden	Mixed Doubles
Gold medal – first place	1932 Prague	Singles
Gold medal – first place	1932 Prague	Doubles
Gold medal – first place	1932 Prague	Mixed Doubles
Bronze medal – third place	1931 Budapest	Singles
Gold medal – first place	1931 Budapest	Doubles
Silver medal – second place	1931 Budapest	Mixed Doubles
Silver medal – second place	1930 Berlin	Singles
Gold medal – first place	1930 Berlin	Doubles
Silver medal – second place	1930 Berlin	Mixed Doubles
Bronze medal – third place	1929 Budapest	Singles
Bronze medal – third place	1929 Budapest	Doubles
Gold medal – first place	1929 Budapest	Mixed Doubles

Anna Sipos (3 April 1908 – 1 January 1988) was a Hungarian international table tennis player.

== Table tennis career ==
She won 21 medals in the World Table Tennis Championships Eleven of these were gold medals. including six consecutive women's doubles wins when partnering Mária Mednyánszky.

== Halls of Fame ==
Sipos was inducted into the International Table Tennis Foundation Hall of Fame in 1993. Sipos, who was Jewish, was inducted into the International Jewish Sports Hall of Fame in 1996.

== See also ==
- List of select Jewish table tennis players
- List of table tennis players
- List of World Table Tennis Championships medalists
