= Mária Mednyánszky =

Hungarian table tennis player

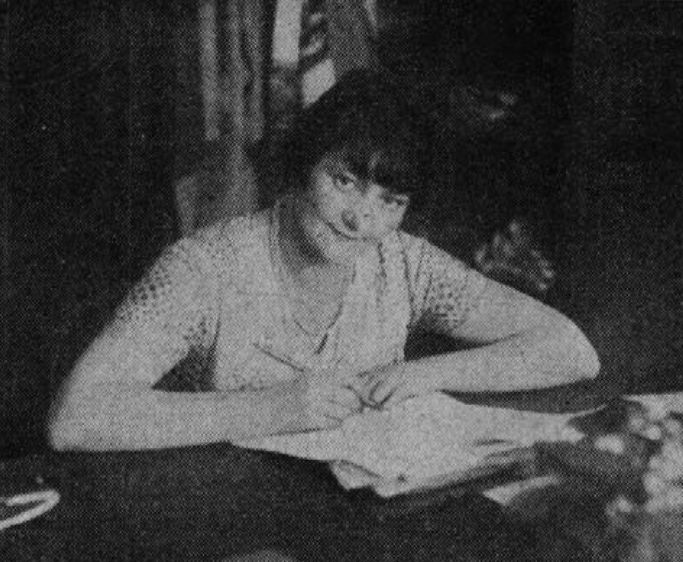

Personal information
- Full name: Mária Mednyánszky
- Nationality: Hungary
- Born: 7 April 1901 Budapest
- Died: 22 December 1978 (aged 77) Budapest

Sport
- Sport: Table tennis
Medal record
Women's table tennis
Representing Hungary
World Championships
Gold medal – first place	1926 London	Singles
Gold medal – first place	1926 London	Mixed Doubles
Gold medal – first place	1928 Stockholm	Singles
Gold medal – first place	1928 Stockholm	Doubles
Gold medal – first place	1928 Stockholm	Mixed Doubles
Gold medal – first place	1929 Budapest	Singles
Gold medal – first place	1930 Berlin	Singles
Gold medal – first place	1930 Berlin	Doubles
Gold medal – first place	1930 Berlin	Mixed Doubles
Gold medal – first place	1931 Budapest	Singles
Gold medal – first place	1931 Budapest	Doubles
Gold medal – first place	1931 Budapest	Mixed Doubles
Gold medal – first place	1932 Prague	Doubles
Gold medal – first place	1933 Baden	Doubles
Gold medal – first place	1933 Baden	Mixed Doubles
Gold medal – first place	1934 Paris	Doubles
Gold medal – first place	1934 Paris	Mixed Doubles
Gold medal – first place	1935 Wembley	Doubles
Silver medal – second place	1932 Prague	Singles
Silver medal – second place	1932 Prague	Mixed Doubles
Silver medal – second place	1933 Baden	Singles
Silver medal – second place	1934 Paris	Team
Silver medal – second place	1935 Wembley	Team
Silver medal – second place	1936 Prague	Mixed Doubles
Bronze medal – third place	1929 Budapest	Doubles
Bronze medal – third place	1929 Budapest	Mixed Doubles
Bronze medal – third place	1935 Wembley	Mixed Doubles
Bronze medal – third place	1936 Prague	Doubles

Mária Mednyánszky (7 April 1901 in Budapest – 22 December 1978 in Budapest) was a Hungarian international table tennis star.

== Table tennis career ==
She became the first official women's world champion winning the women's singles event gold medal in the first edition of the World Table Tennis Championships, held in 1926 at London. She went on to win the title for five successive years and won a further 18 world titles. Only Angelica Rozeanu holds more women's singles titles than her.

She won seven doubles titles including six consecutive wins with Anna Sipos. She also won three English Open titles.

== Awards ==
She was awarded the Golden Order of the Hungarian People's Republic in 1976, Hungary's highest sporting honour.

== See also ==
- List of table tennis players
- List of World Table Tennis Championships medalists
