= Laszlo Bellak =

Hungarian-American table tennis player

Personal information
- Full name: Bellák László
- Nationality: Hungary; United States
- Born: 12 February 1911 Budapest, Hungary
- Died: 20 September 2006 (aged 95) Miami, Florida

Sport
- Sport: Table tennis
Medal record
Men's table tennis
Representing Hungary
World Championships
Silver medal – second place	1938 Wembley	Doubles
Gold medal – first place	1938 Wembley	Mixed Doubles
Gold medal – first place	1938 Wembley	Men's Team
Silver medal – second place	1937 Baden	Men's Team
Bronze medal – third place	1936 Prague	Men's Team
Bronze medal – third place	1935 Wembley	Doubles
Gold medal – first place	1935 Wembley	Men's Team
Silver medal – second place	1934 Paris	Singles
Bronze medal – third place	1934 Paris	Mixed Doubles
Gold medal – first place	1934 Paris	Men's Team
Silver medal – second place	1932 Prague	Doubles
Silver medal – second place	1932 Prague	Men's Team
Bronze medal – third place	1931 Budapest	Mixed Doubles
Gold medal – first place	1931 Budapest	Men's Team
Silver medal – second place	1930 Berlin	Singles
Bronze medal – third place	1930 Berlin	Doubles
Gold medal – first place	1930 Berlin	Men's Team
Silver medal – second place	1929 Budapest	Doubles
Silver medal – second place	1929 Budapest	Mixed Doubles
Silver medal – second place	1928 Stockholm	Singles
Bronze medal – third place	1928 Stockholm	Doubles
Gold medal – first place	1928 Stockholm	Men's Team

Laszlo Bellak (February 12, 1911 – September 20, 2006) was a Hungarian and American table tennis player.

== Table tennis career ==
He represented Hungary 59 times in international competition. He won 21 medals at the World Championships, seven of which were gold. This included six wins as a member of the Hungarian National Team that won the Swaythling Cup in 1928, 1930, 1931, 1934, 1935, and 1938.

Bellak moved to the United States at the start of World War II, and enlisted in the U.S. Army, serving in India and Burma. He was decorated three times, and was honorably discharged with the Victory Medal, attaining the rank of Sergeant.

He won the U.S. Men’s Singles title in 1938, the U.S. Men’s Doubles in 1937, 1939, and 1943, and the U.S. Mixed Doubles in 1941. He also won three English Open titles.

== Halls of Fame ==
Bellak was inducted into the USA Table Tennis Hall of Fame in 1980 and the International Table Tennis Foundation Hall of Fame in 1993.

Bellak, who was Jewish, was inducted into the International Jewish Sports Hall of Fame in 1995.

He was inducted into the Florida Table Tennis Hall of Fame in 1996.

== Book ==
He authored Table Tennis—How A New Sport Was Born: The History of the Hungarian Team Winning 73 Gold Medals (1990).

== See also ==
- List of select Jewish table tennis players
