= Miklós Szabados =

Hungarian-Australian table tennis player

Personal information
- Full name: SZABADOS Miklós
- Nationality: Hungary
- Born: 7 March 1912 Budapest, Hungary
- Died: 12 February 1962 (aged 49) Sydney, Australia

Sport
- Sport: Table tennis
Medal record
Men's table tennis
Representing Hungary
World Championships
Silver medal – second place	1937 Baden	Team
Bronze medal – third place	1936 Prague	Team
Silver medal – second place	1935 Wembley	Singles
Gold medal – first place	1935 Wembley	Doubles
Bronze medal – third place	1935 Wembley	Mixed Doubles
Gold medal – first place	1935 Wembley	Team
Bronze medal – third place	1934 Paris	Singles
Gold medal – first place	1934 Paris	Doubles
Gold medal – first place	1934 Paris	Mixed Doubles
Gold medal – first place	1934 Paris	Team
Silver medal – second place	1932 Prague	Singles
Gold medal – first place	1932 Prague	Doubles
Silver medal – second place	1932 Prague	Mixed Doubles
Silver medal – second place	1932 Prague	Team
Gold medal – first place	1931 Budapest	Singles
Gold medal – first place	1931 Budapest	Doubles
Gold medal – first place	1931 Budapest	Mixed Doubles
Gold medal – first place	1931 Budapest	Team
Gold medal – first place	1930 Berlin	Doubles
Gold medal – first place	1930 Berlin	Mixed Doubles
Gold medal – first place	1930 Berlin	Team
Silver medal – second place	1929 Budapest	Singles
Gold medal – first place	1929 Budapest	Doubles
Gold medal – first place	1929 Budapest	Team

Miklós Szabados (7 March 1912 – 12 February 1962) was a Hungarian and Australian table tennis champion.

== Table tennis career ==
Szabados was born in Budapest, Hungary on 7 March 1912. He first started playing table tennis when he was thirteen, and defeated Victor Barna in a tournament in 1927.

From 1928 to 1935, Szabados won the world doubles title six times (1929–32 and 1934–35). He won mixed doubles three times (1930, 1931, and 1934), and was a member of the Swaythling Cup team five times (1929–31, 1934, and 1935). He won four world events in 1931: singles, doubles, mixed doubles, and the Swaythling Cup.

As his mother had been born Jewish, Szabados left his studies at the University of Berlin in 1933 and fled to Paris. He moved to Britain in 1936. He won five English Open titles.

Szabados toured the Far East, South America, and Australia on an exhibition tour with István Kelen starting in 1937. At the Australian championships in Sydney, they won the doubles tournament, and Szabados won over Kelen for the singles title.

Szabados emigrated to Sydney after the tour and opened a table tennis club. He married Marie Alice Bracher in 1941, and they had one son, Sandor. They were divorced in 1954. While serving with the Allied Works Council during World War II, Szabados he was stationed at Alice Springs, Northern Territory, in 1943–44. During this period he used his time to play and teach table tennis to his colleagues at the Works Council and play bridge with the Northern Territory's administrator's wife. As a result, he played more bridge than anything else as he was already an NSW Bridge champion.

He won the singles title at the Australian Table Tennis Championship in 1950 and 1952, and won doubles in 1950 and mixed doubles in 1955. He continued to run table tennis academies and coach. His students Cliff McDonald and Michael Wilcox both won the Australian singles championships.

He died of pneumonia on 12 February 1962 in Sydney.

== Hall of Fame ==
Szabados was born a Catholic in 1912. His mother, Rosa Schwarz, converted to Catholicism at her marriage. As a Jew by birth, Szabados was posthumously inducted into the International Jewish Sports Hall of Fame in 1987.

Szabados was inducted into the International Table Tennis Foundation Hall of Fame in 1993.
