= World Table Tennis Championships =

Table tennis competition

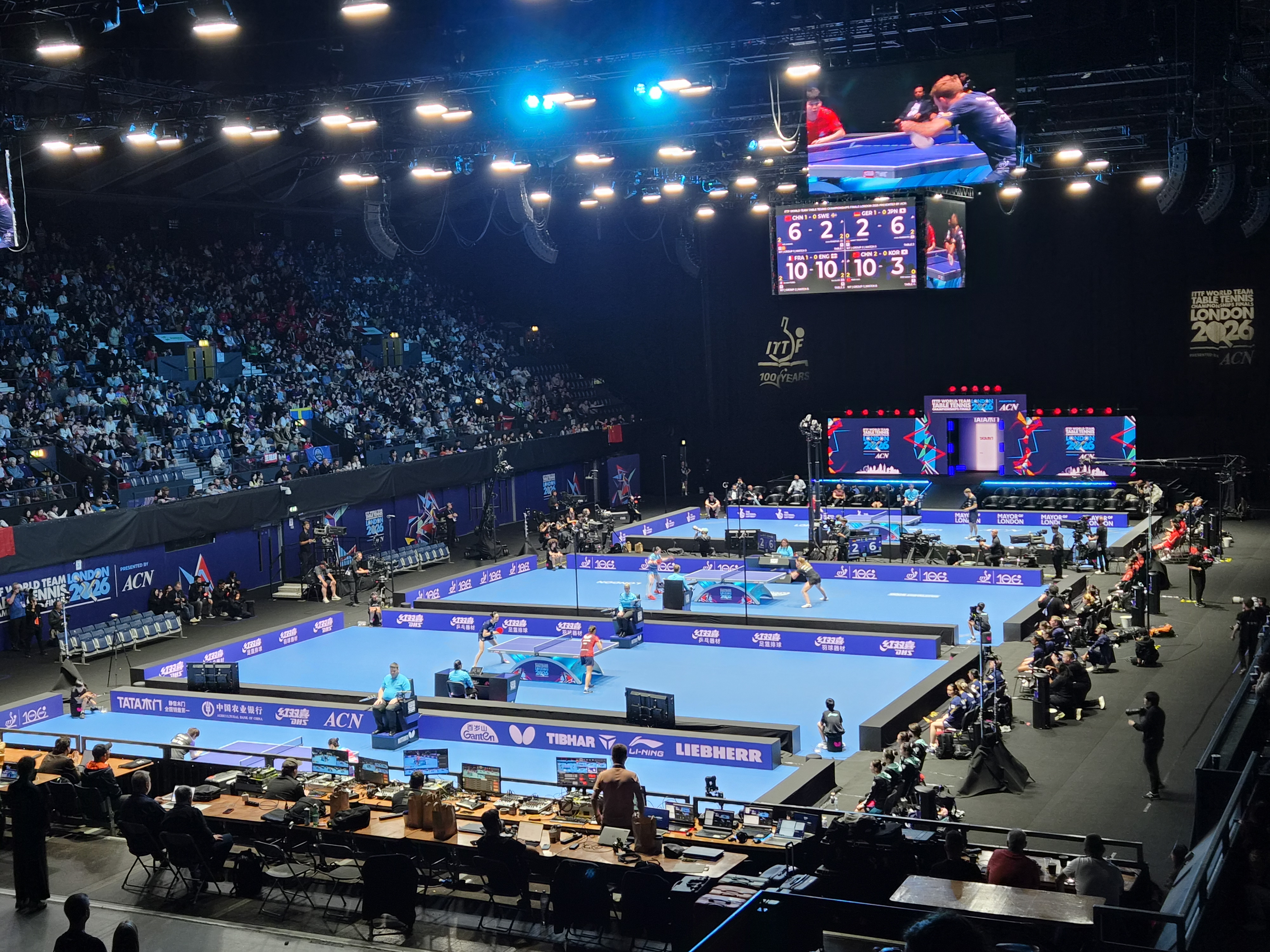
- The 2026 World Championships in London
- Status: Active
- Genre: Global sports event
- Date: c. April–May
- Frequency: Annual
- Inaugurated: 1926
- Organiser: ITTF

The World Table Tennis Championships are table tennis competitions held by the International Table Tennis Federation (ITTF). The World Championships have been held since 1926, biennially since 1957. Five individual events, which include men's singles, women's singles, men's doubles, women's double and mixed doubles, are currently held in odd numbered years. The World Team Table Tennis Championships, which include men's team and women's team events, were first their own competition in 2000. The Team Championships are held in even numbered years.

In the earlier days of the tournament, Hungary's men's team was a dominant force, winning the championships 12 times. This was followed by a short period of dominance by Japan in the 1950s. From the 1960s onwards, China emerged as the new dominant power in this tournament and, with the exception of 1989–2000, when Sweden won four times, China continues to dominate the sport. China's men's team holds a record 24 world team championship titles.

In the 1950s, Japan's women team was a force to be reckoned with winning a total of 8 titles. The Chinese women started their strong grip on the world team championships from the 1970s onwards. They have only lost twice since 1975. China holds 24 women's team titles.

== Trophies ==
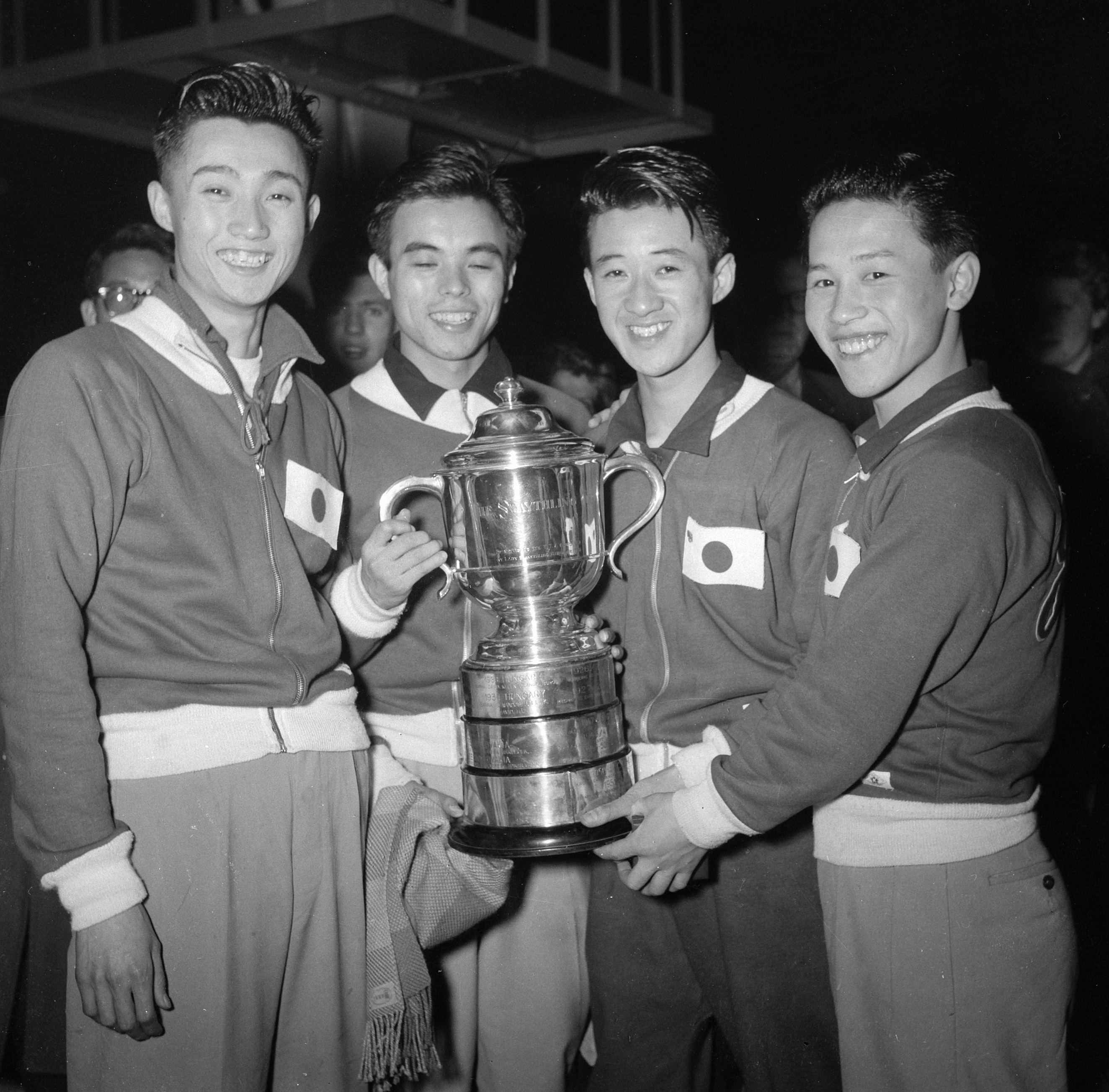
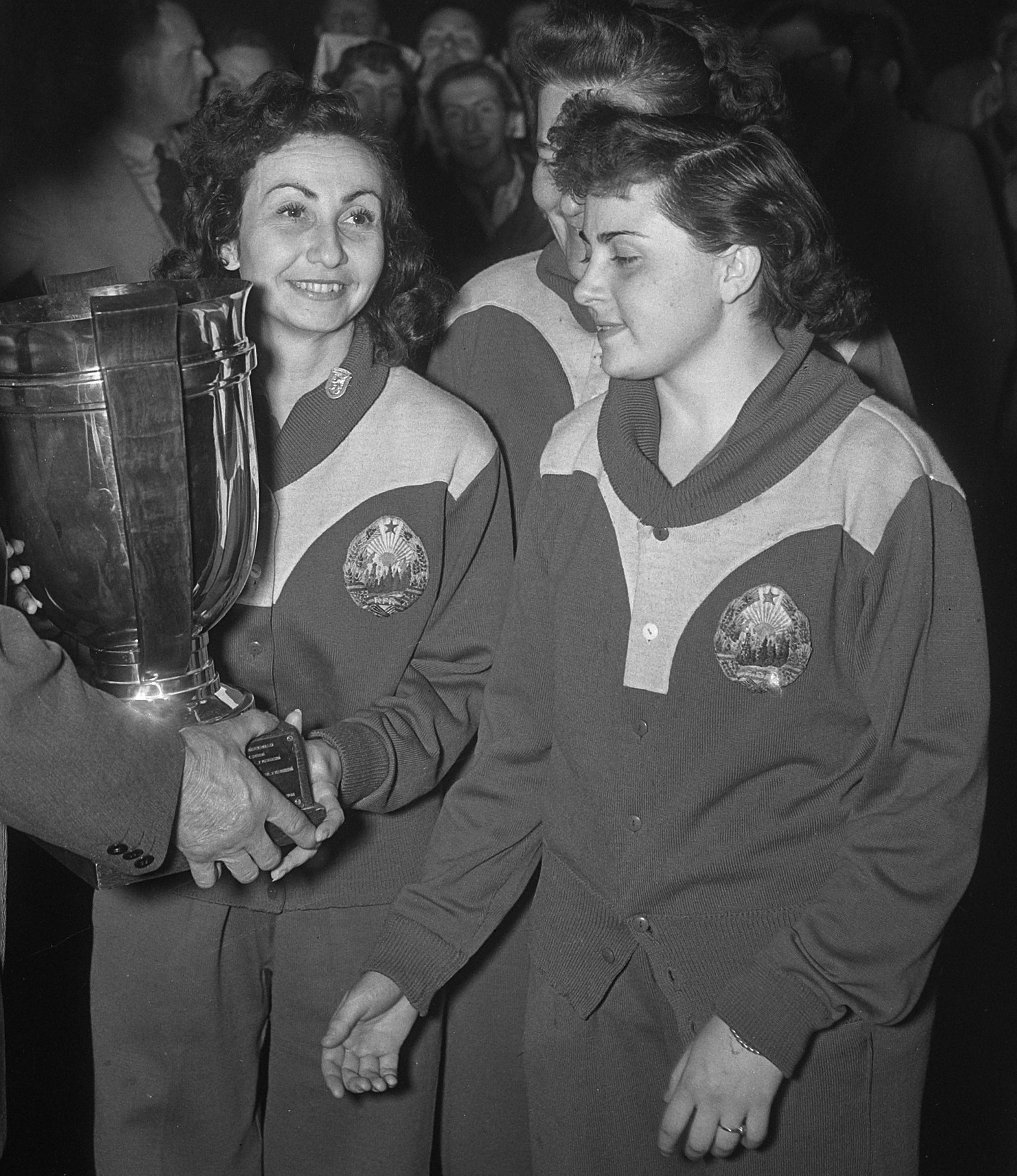
Japanese men's team won the Swaythling Cup and Romanian women's team won the Corbillon Cup at the 1955 World Table Tennis Championships

There are 7 different trophies presented to the winners of the various events, held by winning associations, and returned for the next world championships.

- Team competition:
  - Swaythling Cup for men's team, donated in 1926 by Gladys, Baroness Swaythling, mother of the first ITTF president, Ivor Montagu
  - Corbillon Cup for women's team, donated in 1933 by Marcel Corbillon, president of the French Table Tennis Association. The original Cup was won by German team in 1939, and disappeared during Berlin occupation after World War II; the current Corbillon Cup is a replica made in 1949.
- Singles competition:
  - St. Bride Vase for men's singles, donated in 1929 by C.Corti Woodcock, member of the exclusive St. Bride Table Tennis Club in London, after Fred Perry of England won the title in Budapest
  - Geist Prize for women's singles, donated in 1931 by Dr. Gaspar Geist, president of the Hungarian Table Tennis Association
- Doubles competition:
  - Iran Cup for men's doubles; first presented at the 1947 World Championships by the Mohammad Reza Pahlavi, the Shah of Iran
  - W.J. Pope Trophy for women's doubles; donated in 1948 by the ITTF honorary general secretary W.J. Pope
  - Heydusek Cup for mixed doubles; donated in 1948 by Zdenek Heydusek, secretary of the Czechoslovakia Association.

In addition, the Egypt Cup is presented to the next host of world championships. The Cup was donated by King Farouk of Egypt in 1939, when the championships were held in Cairo, Egypt.

== Editions ==
The ITTF held individual events and team events separately for the first time in 1999 and 2000 respectively, and 2001 was the last time individual and team events were held together. Starting in 2003 individual events and team events were held separately again and each continue to be held separately every other year.

Individual events Team events

Edition	Year	Host city	Host country	Events
1	1926	(England) London	England	5
2	1928	(Sweden) Stockholm	Sweden	6
3	1929	(Hungary) Budapest	Hungary	6
4	1930	(Germany) Berlin	Germany	6
5	1931	(Hungary) Budapest	Hungary	6
6	1932	(Czechoslovakia) Prague	Czechoslovakia	6
7	1933	(Austria) Baden bei Wien	Austria	6
8	1934	(France) Paris	France	7
9	1935	(England) Wembley	England	7
10	1936	(Czech Republic) Prague	Czechoslovakia	7
11	1937	(Austria) Baden bei Wien	Austria	7
12	1938	(England) Wembley	England	7
13	1939	(Egypt) Cairo	Egypt	7
14	1947	(France) Paris	France	7
15	1948	(England) Wembley	England	7
16	1949	(Sweden) Stockholm	Sweden	7
17	1950	(Hungary) Budapest	Hungary	7
18	1951	(Austria) Vienna	Austria	7
19	1952	(India) Mumbai	India	7
20	1953	(Romania) Bucharest	Romania	7
21	1954	(England) Wembley	England	7
22	1955	(Netherlands) Utrecht	Netherlands	7
23	1956	(Japan) Tokyo	Japan	7
24	1957	(Sweden) Stockholm	Sweden	7
25	1959	(West Germany) Dortmund	FR Germany	7
26	1961	(China) Beijing	China	7
27	1963	(Czechoslovakia) Prague	Czechoslovakia	7
28	1965	(Socialist Federal Republic of Yugoslavia) Ljubljana	Yugoslavia	7
29	1967	(Sweden) Stockholm	Sweden	7
30	1969	(West Germany) Munich	FR Germany	7
31	1971	(Japan) Nagoya	Japan	7
32	1973	(Socialist Federal Republic of Yugoslavia) Sarajevo	Yugoslavia	7
33	1975	(India) Kolkata	India	7
34	1977	(England) Birmingham	England	7
35	1979	(North Korea) Pyongyang	DPR Korea	7
36	1981	(Socialist Federal Republic of Yugoslavia) Novi Sad	Yugoslavia	7
37	1983	(Japan) Tokyo	Japan	7
38	1985	(Sweden) Gothenburg	Sweden	7
39	1987	(India) New Delhi	India	7
40	1989	(West Germany) Dortmund	FR Germany	7
41	1991	(Japan) Chiba City	Japan	7
42	1993	(Sweden) Gothenburg	Sweden	7
43	1995	(China) Tianjin	China	7
44	1997	(England) Manchester	England	7

Edition	Year	Host city	Host country	Events
45	1999	(Netherlands) Eindhoven	Netherlands	5
45	2000	(Malaysia) Kuala Lumpur	Malaysia	2
46	2001	(Japan) Osaka	Japan	7
47	2003	(France) Paris	France	5
47	2004	(Qatar) Doha	Qatar	2
48	2005	(China) Shanghai	China	5
48	2006	(Germany) Bremen	Germany	2
49	2007	(Croatia) Zagreb	Croatia	5
49	2008	(China) Guangzhou	China	2
50	2009	(Japan) Yokohama	Japan	5
50	2010	(Russia) Moscow	Russia	2
51	2011	(Netherlands) Rotterdam	Netherlands	5
51	2012	(Germany) Dortmund	Germany	2
52	2013	(France) Paris	France	5
52	2014	(Japan) Tokyo	Japan	2
53	2015	(China) Suzhou	China	5
53	2016	(Malaysia) Kuala Lumpur	Malaysia	2
54	2017	(Germany) Düsseldorf	Germany	5
54	2018	(Sweden) Halmstad	Sweden	2
55	2019	(Hungary) Budapest	Hungary	5
55	~~2020~~	(South Korea) Busan	South Korea (cancelled)	–
56	2021	(United States) Houston	United States	5
56	2022	(China) Chengdu	China	2
57	2023	(South Africa) Durban	South Africa	5
57	2024	(South Korea) Busan	South Korea	2
58	2025	(Qatar) Doha	Qatar	5
58	2026	(England) London	England	2
59	2027	(Kazakhstan) Astana	Kazakhstan	5
59	2028	(Japan) Fukuoka	Japan	2
60	2029	(Brazil) Rio de Janeiro	Brazil	5

== All-time medal table ==
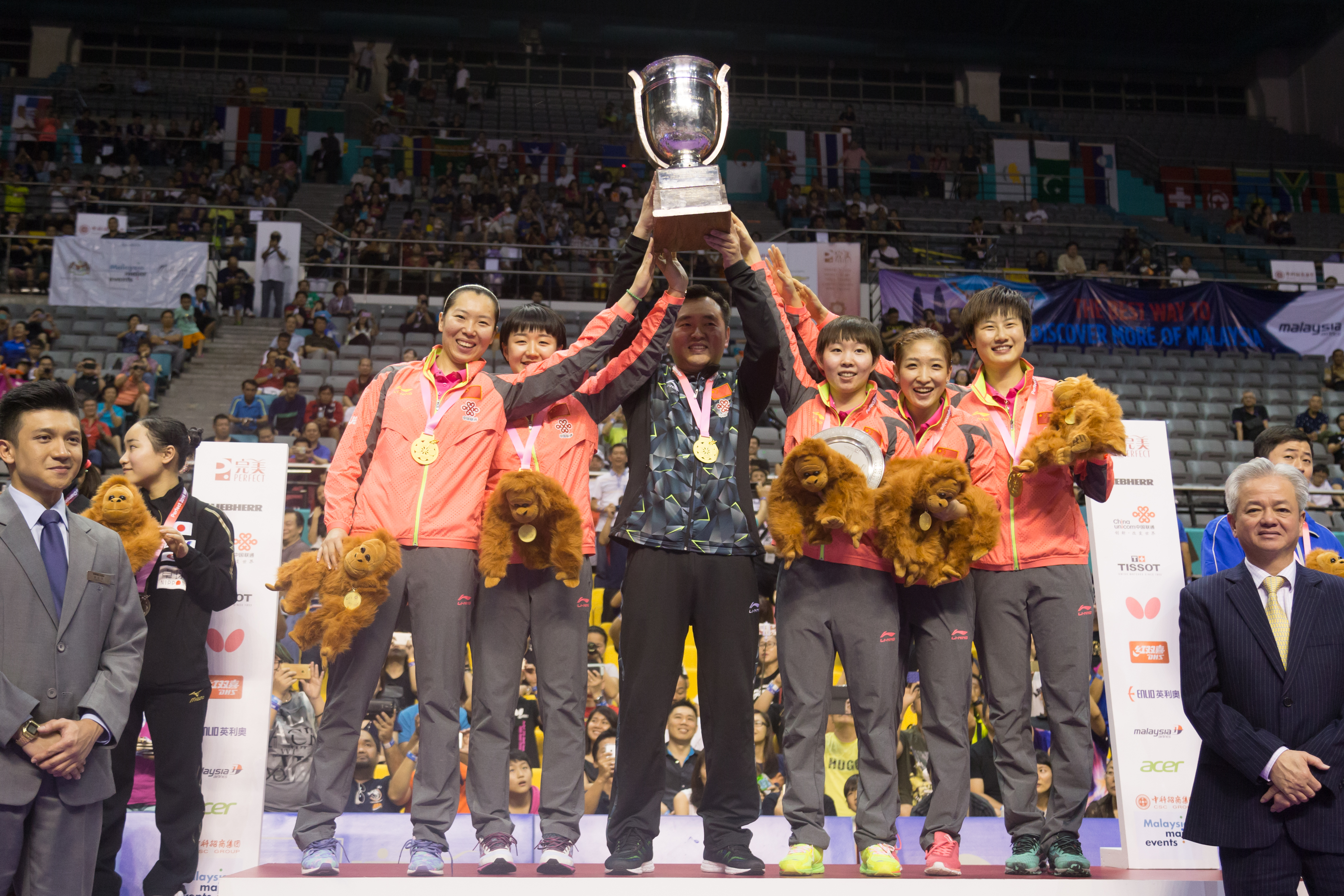
Chinese women's team held the trophy for the 20th time in 2016. The team have only lost twice since 1975.

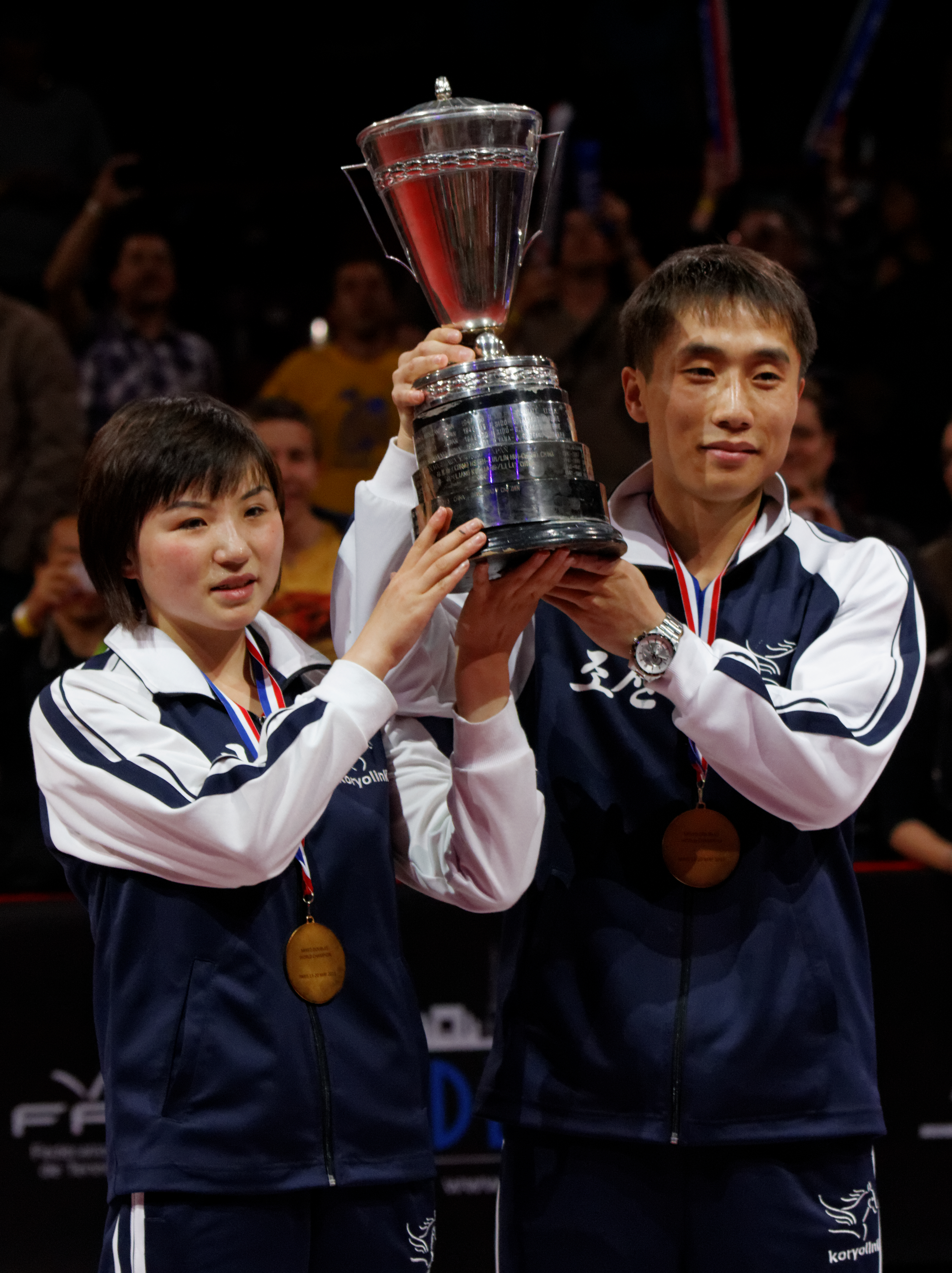
North Koreans Kim Hyok-bong and Kim Jong with the Heydusek Cup after winning the mixed doubles title in 2013.

Updated after the 2026 World Team Table Tennis Championships. Doubles pairs from different associations were counted as a half a point.

Rank	Nation	Gold	Silver	Bronze	Total
1	China	164	106	172.5	442.5
2	Hungary	68	59	73.5	200.5
3	Japan	49	45	79	173
4	Czechoslovakia	28	36.5	58.5	123
5	Romania	17	11	19.5	47.5
6	Sweden	15	13	15.5	43.5
7	England	14	26.5	57	97.5
8	United States	10	3	19.5	32.5
9	Austria	7	14	35	56
10	South Korea	4.5	18	46	68.5
11	Germany	4	15.5	22.5	42
12	North Korea	3.5	8	12	23.5
13	Yugoslavia	3	11	13.5	27.5
14	Soviet Union	3	4	7	14
15	France	2	3.5	23	28.5
16	Chinese Taipei	1	4	10	15
17	Singapore	1	2	5	8
18	West Germany	1	2	4	7
19	Korea	1	1	3	5
20	Scotland	1	1	1.5	3.5
21	Poland	0	3.5	6.5	10
22	Hong Kong	0	2	25.5	27.5
23	Belgium	0	2	1	3
24	Wales	0	1.5	3	4.5
25	Belarus	0	1.5	1.5	3
26	East Germany	0	1	1	2
27	Brazil	0	1	0	1
28	Croatia	0	0.5	2.5	3
29	Luxembourg	0	0.5	1	1.5
30	Spain	0	0.5	0	0.5
31	Egypt	0	0	2.5	2.5
32	India	0	0	2	2
33	Greece	0	0	1.5	1.5
34	Denmark	0	0	1	1
34	Italy	0	0	1	1
34	Portugal	0	0	1	1
34	Vietnam	0	0	1	1
38	Netherlands	0	0	0.5	0.5
Totals (38 entries)		397	398	730	1,525

== Multiple medalists ==
Top medalists ordered by number of gold medals at the World Table Tennis Championships (including at team events) are listed below. 13 men and 10 women won at least nine gold medals.

=== Men ===
Rank	Player	Country	From	To	Gold	Silver	Bronze	Total
1	Viktor Barna	Hungary / England	1929	1954	22	7	12	41
2	Miklós Szabados	Hungary	1929	1937	15	6	3	24
3	Ma Long	China	2006	2024	14	1	4	19
4	Bohumil Váňa	Czechoslovakia	1935	1955	13	10	7	30
5	Ichiro Ogimura	Japan	1954	1965	12	5	3	20
6	Wang Liqin	China	1997	2013	11	4	5	20
7	Xu Xin	China	2009	2019	10	1	2	13
8	Wang Chuqin	China	2018	2026	10	1	0	11
9	Ivan Andreadis	Czechoslovakia	1947	1957	9	10	8	27
10	Ferenc Sidó	Hungary	1947	1961	9	9	8	26
11	Ma Lin	China	1999	2013	9	7	4	20
12	Wang Hao	China	2003	2014	9	4	3	16
13	Fan Zhendong	China	2014	2024	9	2	2	13

=== Women ===
Rank	Player	Country	From	To	Gold	Silver	Bronze	Total
1	Mária Mednyánszky	Hungary	1926	1936	18	6	4	28
2	Angelica Rozeanu	Romania	1937	1957	17	5	8	30
3	Wang Nan	China	1997	2008	15	3	2	20
4	Anna Sipos	Hungary	1929	1935	11	6	4	21
5	Gizella Farkas	Hungary	1947	1959	10	9	8	27
6	Guo Yue	China	2003	2013	10	5	2	17
7	Zhang Yining	China	1999	2009	10	2	4	16
8	Sun Yingsha	China	2019	2026	10	1	1	12
9	Li Xiaoxia	China	2006	2016	9	5	2	16
10	Deng Yaping	China	1989	1997	9	5	–	14

== Players with all-around champions ==
8 men and 9 women who won the gold medals in all singles, doubles, mixed doubles and team events are listed below.

Name	Gender	Nationality		Birth	Times won			
Name	Gender	Nationality		Birth	Singles	Doubles	Mixed	Team
Viktor Barna	Male	(Hungary) (England)	Hungary; England	1911	5 (1930, 1932, 1933, 1934, 1935)	8 (1929, 1930, 1931, 1932, 1933, 1934, 1935, 1939)	2 (1932, 1935)	7 (1929, 1930, 1931, 1933, 1934, 1935, 1938)
Miklós Szabados	Male	(Hungary)	Hungary	1912	1 (1932)	6 (1929, 1930, 1931, 1932, 1934, 1935)	3 (1930, 1931, 1934)	5 (1929, 1930, 1931, 1934, 1935)
Bohumil Váňa	Male	(Czechoslovakia)	Czechoslovakia	1920	2 (1938, 1947)	3 (1947, 1948, 1951)	3 (1937, 1939, 1951)	5 (1939, 1947, 1948, 1950, 1951)
Ferenc Sidó	Male	(Hungary)	Hungary	1923	1 (1953)	2 (1950, 1953)	4 (1949, 1950, 1952, 1953)	2 (1949, 1952)
Angelica Rozeanu	Female	(Romania)	Romania	1921	6 (1950, 1951, 1952, 1953, 1954, 1955)	3 (1953, 1955, 1956)	3 (1951, 1952, 1953)	5 (1950, 1951, 1953, 1955, 1956)
Ichiro Ogimura	Male	(Japan)	Japan	1932	2 (1954, 1956)	2 (1956, 1959)	3 (1957, 1959, 1961)	5 (1954, 1955, 1956, 1957, 1959)
Kimiyo Matsuzaki	Female	(Japan)	Japan	1938	2 (1959, 1963)	1 (1963)	1 (1961)	3 (1959, 1961, 1963)
Lin Huiqing	Female	(China)	China	1941	1 (1971)	2 (1965, 1971)	1 (1971)	1 (1965)
Cao Yanhua	Female	(China)	China	1962	2 (1983, 1985)	1 (1981)	1 (1985)	3 (1979, 1981, 1983)
Hyun Jung-hwa	Female	(South Korea)	South Korea	1969	1 (1993)	1 (1987)	1 (1989)	1 (1991)
Liu Guoliang	Male	(China)	China	1976	1 (1999)	2 (1997, 1999)	1 (1997)	3 (1995, 1997, 2001)
Wang Nan	Female	(China)	China	1978	3 (1999, 2001, 2003)	5 (1999, 2001, 2003, 2005, 2007)	1 (2003)	6 (1997, 2000, 2001, 2004, 2006, 2008)
Wang Liqin	Male	(China)	China	1978	3 (2001, 2005, 2007)	2 (2001, 2003)	2 (2005, 2007)	4 (2001, 2004, 2006, 2008)
Guo Yue	Female	(China)	China	1988	1 (2007)	2 (2009, 2011, 2013)	2 (2005, 2007)	4 (2004, 2006, 2008, 2012)
Liu Shiwen	Female	(China)	China	1991	1 (2019)	2 (2015, 2017)	1 (2019)	4 (2012, 2014, 2016, 2018)
Sun Yingsha	Female	(China)	China	2000	2 (2023, 2025)	2 (2019, 2021)	3 (2021, 2023, 2025)	3 (2022, 2024, 2026)
Wang Chuqin	Male	(China)	China	2000	1 (2025)	2 (2019, 2023)	3 (2021, 2023, 2025)	4 (2018, 2022, 2024, 2026)

== See also ==
- List of World Table Tennis Championships medalists
- Table tennis at the Summer Olympics
- Table Tennis World Cup
- ITTF World Tour
- ITTF World Tour Grand Finals
