= 1937 World Table Tennis Championships – Men's team =

1937 Swaythling Cup (men's team)
- Venue: Baden bei Wien

The 1937 World Table Tennis Championships – Swaythling Cup (men's team) was the 11th edition of the men's team championship.

United States won the gold medal after defeating Hungary 5–3 in the final.

== Swaythling Cup table ==
Pos	Team	P	W	L	Squad
1	United States	12	11	1	Abe Berenbaum, Robert Blattner, James McClure, Sol Schiff
1	Hungary	12	11	1	Viktor Barna, Laszlo Bellak, Istvan Lovaszy, Ferenc Soos, Miklós Szabados
3	Czechoslovakia	12	10	2	Miloslav Hamr, Stanislav Kolář, Pavel Löwy, Adolf Šlár, Bohumil Váňa
4	Austria	12	9	3	Richard Bergmann, Helmut Goebel, Hans Hartinger, Alfred Liebster, Papazian
4	Poland	12	9	3	Alojzy Ehrlich, Samuel Schieff, Shimcha Finkelstein, Jezierski
6	(Socialist Federal Republic of Yugoslavia) Yugoslavia	12	7	5	Max Marinko, Milan Lazar, Ladislav Hexner, Sergej Seneković, Karlo Stein
7	England	12	5	7	Ken Hyde, Adrian Haydon, Maurice Bergl, Andrew Millar, Stanley Proffitt
8	Romania	12	4	8	Farkas Paneth, Mircea Sapira, Geza Eros, Krebs
8	France	12	4	8	Michel Haguenauer, Charles Dubouillé, Raoul Bedoc, Jean-Claude Guérin, Paul Wolschoefer, Daniel Guérin
8	Lithuania	12	4	8	Vytautas Gerulaitis, Vilius Variakojis, Vladas Dzindziliauskas
11	Germany	12	2	10	Georg Kutz, Helmut Ullrich, Erwin Munchow, Heinz Benthien
12	Belgium	12	1	11	Roger Lejeune, Max Kahn, André Staf
13	Egypt	12	1	11	Mansour Helmy, Marcel Geargoura, Hassan Abou Heif, Tawhid Helal, Anwar Massaoud, Said Hegazi

== Final ==
United States 5	(Kingdom of Hungary) Hungary 3	Scores
McClure	Bellak	21-12 21-17
Schiff	Bellak	18-21 21-13 21-16
Schiff	Soos	21-8 20-22 26-24
Blattner	Soos	21-17 13-21 13-21
McClure	Soos	21-12 19-21 11-10+
Blattner	Barna	17-21 21-17 18-21
McClure	Barna	21-14 18-21 21-17
Schiff	Barna	24-22 21-18
Blattner	Bellak	13-21 21-4 14-21

+ drawn

== See also ==
List of World Table Tennis Championships medalists
