= 1936 World Table Tennis Championships – Men's team =

1936 Swaythling Cup (men's team)
- Venue: Prague

The 1936 World Table Tennis Championships – Swaythling Cup (men's team) was the tenth edition of the men's team championship.

Austria defeated Romania 5–4 in the final to win the gold medal. Four teams tied for third place as there was no play-off to determine a single bronze medal winner.

== Swaythling Cup tables ==
=== Group 1 ===
Pos	Team	P	W	L	Squad
1	Austria	6	6	0	Erwin Kohn, Richard Bergmann, Helmut Goebel, Hans Hartinger, Alfred Liebster
2	Czechoslovakia	6	5	1	Stanislav Kolář, Bohumil Váňa, Miloslav Hamr, Václav Tereba, František Hanec Pivec
3	United States	6	4	2	Gilbert Marshall, Buddy Blattner, Jimmy McClure, Dick Tindall
4	England	6	3	3	Ken Hyde, Adrian Haydon, Maurice Bergl, Hyman Lurie, Stanley Proffitt
5	(Socialist Federal Republic of Yugoslavia) Yugoslavia	6	2	4	Max Marinko, Milan Lazar, Ladislav Hexner, Stevica Maksimović, Otto Weissbacher
6	Germany	6	1	5	Dieter Mauritz, Georg Kutz, Helmut Ullrich, Erich Deisler
7	Belgium	6	0	6	Roger Lejeune, Max Kahn, André Staf

=== Group 2 ===
Pos	Team	P	W	L	Squad
1	Romania	6	5	1	Viktor Vladone, Marin Vasile-Goldberger, Farkas Paneth
2	France	6	4	2	Michel Haguenauer, Charles Dubouillé, Raoul Bedoc, Daniel Guérin, Paul Wolschoefer
2	(Kingdom of Hungary) Hungary	6	4	2	Viktor Barna, Miklós Szabados, Laszlo Bellak, István Kelen, Tibor Házi
2	Poland	6	4	2	Alojzy Ehrlich, Samuel Schieff, Shimcha Finkelstein, Jezierski
5	Lithuania	6	3	3	Juozas Remikis, Vytautas Gerulaitis, Vilius Variakojis, Vladas Dzindziliauskas
6	Latvia	6	1	5	Isays Joffe, Idelsohns, Schacofs, Doerin Stamms
7	Netherlands	6	0	6	Hans Cserno, Arwid Danner, Henk Clausen

== Final ==
Austria 5	Romania 4	Scores
Bergmann	Paneth	21-15 21-14
Liebster	Vladone	21-19 11-21 18-21
Goebel	Vasile-Goldberger	11-21 09-21
Bergmann	Vladone	19-21 21-14 21-13
Goebel	Paneth	09-21 11-21
Liebster	Vasile-Goldberger	21-13 23-21
Goebel	Vladone	21-19 13-21 12-21
Bergmann	Vasile-Goldberger	21-19 21-16
Liebster	Paneth	21-15 08-21 21-10

== See also ==
List of World Table Tennis Championships medalists
