= 1936 World Table Tennis Championships – Mixed doubles =

1936 Mixed doubles
- Venue: Prague

The 1936 World Table Tennis Championships mixed doubles was the tenth edition of the mixed doubles championship.

Miloslav Hamr and Gertrude Kleinová defeated István Kelen and Mária Mednyánszky in the final by three sets to one.

== Results ==
Round of 16
(Kingdom of Hungary) Viktor Barna (Kingdom of Hungary) Magda Gál	3
(United States) Dick Tindall (United States) Corinne Migneco	0
(Czechoslovakia) Stanislav Kolář (Czechoslovakia) Marie Šmídová	3
(Kingdom of Hungary) Laszlo Bellak (Kingdom of Hungary) Ida Ferenczy	2
(England) Hyman Lurie (England) Wendy Woodhead
(Czechoslovakia) Miloslav Hamr (Czechoslovakia) Gertrude Kleinová
(Poland) Alojzy Ehrlich (Czechoslovakia) Anna Braunová	3
(England) Adrian Haydon (England) Margaret Osborne	0
(Czechoslovakia) Pavel Löwy (Czechoslovakia) Kralova	1
(United States) Jimmy McClure (United States) Ruth Aarons	3
(Czechoslovakia) Jahoda (Czechoslovakia) Hamplova	1
(Kingdom of Hungary) István Kelen (Kingdom of Hungary) Mária Mednyánszky	3
(Germany) Helmut Ullrich (Germany) Annemarie Schulz	3
(England) Ken Hyde (England) Dinah Newey	2
(Czechoslovakia) František Hanec Pivec (Romania) Angelica Adelstein	0
(Czechoslovakia) Václav Tereba (Czechoslovakia) Marie Kettnerová	3

Quarterfinals
(Kingdom of Hungary) Barna (Kingdom of Hungary) Gál	2
(Czechoslovakia) Kolář (Czechoslovakia) Šmídová	3
(Czechoslovakia) Hamr (Czechoslovakia) Kleinová	w/o
(Poland) Ehrlich (Czechoslovakia) Braunová	scr
(United States) McClure (United States) Aarons	1
(Kingdom of Hungary) Kelen (Kingdom of Hungary) Mednyánszky	3
(Germany) Ullrich (Germany) Schulz	3
(Czechoslovakia) Tereba (Czechoslovakia) Kettnerová	2

Semifinals
(Czechoslovakia) Kolář (Czechoslovakia) Šmídová	8	6	15
(Czechoslovakia) Hamr (Czechoslovakia) Kleinová	21	21	21
(Kingdom of Hungary) Kelen (Kingdom of Hungary) Mednyánszky	3
(Germany) Ullrich (Germany) Schulz	0

Final
(Czechoslovakia) Hamr (Czechoslovakia) Kleinová	21	21	15	21
(Kingdom of Hungary) Kelen (Kingdom of Hungary) Mednyánszky	16	19	21	18

== See also ==
List of World Table Tennis Championships medalists
