= 1937 World Table Tennis Championships =

The 1937 World Table Tennis Championships were held in Baden bei Wien from February 1 to February 7, 1937.

== Medalists ==
=== Team ===
Event	Gold	Silver	Bronze
Swaythling Cup; Men's team	United States; Abe Berenbaum; Robert Blattner; James McClure; Sol Schiff	Hungary; Viktor Barna; Laszlo Bellak; Istvan Lovaszy; Ferenc Soos; Miklós Szabados	Czechoslovakia; Miloslav Hamr; Stanislav Kolář; Pavel Löwy; Adolf Šlár; Bohumil Váňa
Corbillon Cup; Women's team	United States; Ruth Aarons; Emily Fuller; Dolores Kuenz; Jessie Purves	Germany; Hilde Bussmann; Astrid Hobohm-Krebsbach; Annemarie Schulz	Czechoslovakia; Vlasta Depetrisová; Marie Kettnerová; Podhajecka; Věra Votrubcová

=== Individual ===
Event	Gold	Silver	Bronze
Men's Singles	(Austria) Richard Bergmann	(Poland) Alojzy Ehrlich	(Austria) Hans Hartinger
Men's Singles	(Austria) Richard Bergmann	(Poland) Alojzy Ehrlich	(Kingdom of Hungary) Ferenc Soos
Women's singles	(United States) Ruth Aarons		(Czechoslovakia) Marie Kettnerová
Women's singles	(Austria) Gertrude Pritzi		(Nazi Germany) Hilde Bussmann
Men's Doubles	(United States) Robert Blattner (United States) James McClure	(Austria) Richard Bergmann (Austria) Helmut Goebel	(Czechoslovakia) Miloslav Hamr (Czechoslovakia) František Hanec Pivec
Men's Doubles	(United States) Robert Blattner (United States) James McClure	(Austria) Richard Bergmann (Austria) Helmut Goebel	(Czechoslovakia) Adolf Šlár (Czechoslovakia) Václav Tereba
Women's Doubles	(Czechoslovakia) Vlasta Depetrisová (Czechoslovakia) Věra Votrubcová	(England) Margaret Osborne (England) Wendy Woodhead	(England) Lillian Hutchings (Austria) Stefanie Werle
Women's Doubles	(Czechoslovakia) Vlasta Depetrisová (Czechoslovakia) Věra Votrubcová	(England) Margaret Osborne (England) Wendy Woodhead	(Czechoslovakia) Marie Kettnerová (Nazi Germany) Annemarie Schulz
Mixed Doubles	(Czechoslovakia) Bohumil Váňa (Czechoslovakia) Věra Votrubcová	(Czechoslovakia) Stanislav Kolář (Czechoslovakia) Marie Kettnerová	(Romania) Geza Eros (Romania) Angelica Adelstein
Mixed Doubles	(Czechoslovakia) Bohumil Váňa (Czechoslovakia) Věra Votrubcová	(Czechoslovakia) Stanislav Kolář (Czechoslovakia) Marie Kettnerová	(United States) Abe Berenbaum (United States) Emily Fuller
