= 1936 World Table Tennis Championships =

The 1936 World Table Tennis Championships were held in Prague, Czechoslovakia from March 12 to March 18, 1936.

The championships were criticised for the bad management and poor tables. The Lucerna Palace arena (a 4,000-seat, underground concert hall) conditions were also described as chaos.

== Medalists ==
=== Team ===
Event	Gold	Silver	Bronze
Swaythling Cup; Men's team	Austria; Erwin Kohn; Richard Bergmann; Helmut Goebel; Hans Hartinger; Alfred Liebster	Romania; Viktor Vladone; Marin Vasile-Goldberger; Farkas Paneth	Czechoslovakia; Stanislav Kolář; Bohumil Váňa; Miloslav Hamr; Václav Tereba; František Hanec Pivec
Swaythling Cup; Men's team	Austria; Erwin Kohn; Richard Bergmann; Helmut Goebel; Hans Hartinger; Alfred Liebster	Romania; Viktor Vladone; Marin Vasile-Goldberger; Farkas Paneth	France; Michel Haguenauer; Charles Dubouillé; Raoul Bedoc; Daniel Guérin; Paul Wolschoefer
Swaythling Cup; Men's team	Austria; Erwin Kohn; Richard Bergmann; Helmut Goebel; Hans Hartinger; Alfred Liebster	Romania; Viktor Vladone; Marin Vasile-Goldberger; Farkas Paneth	Hungary; Viktor Barna; Miklós Szabados; Laszlo Bellak; István Kelen; Tibor Házi
Swaythling Cup; Men's team	Austria; Erwin Kohn; Richard Bergmann; Helmut Goebel; Hans Hartinger; Alfred Liebster	Romania; Viktor Vladone; Marin Vasile-Goldberger; Farkas Paneth	Poland; Alojzy Ehrlich; Samuel Schieff; Shimcha Finkelstein; Jezierski
Corbillon Cup; Women's team	(Czechoslovakia) Czechoslovakia; Marie Kettnerová; Gertrude Kleinová; Marie Šmídová; Věra Votrubcová	(Nazi Germany) Germany; Astrid Krebsbach; Anita Felguth; Hilde Bussmann (United States) United States; Ruth Aarons; Jessie Purves; Corinne Migneco	Not awarded, as there was a tie for silver.

=== Individual ===
Event	Gold	Silver	Bronze
Men's Singles	(Czechoslovakia) Stanislav Kolář	(Poland) Alojzy Ehrlich	(Kingdom of Hungary) Ferenc Soos
Men's Singles	(Czechoslovakia) Stanislav Kolář	(Poland) Alojzy Ehrlich	(Austria) Richard Bergmann
Women's Singles	(United States) Ruth Aarons	(Nazi Germany) Astrid Krebsbach	(Czechoslovakia) Marie Kettnerová
Women's Singles	(United States) Ruth Aarons	(Nazi Germany) Astrid Krebsbach	(Czechoslovakia) Marie Šmídová
Men's Doubles	(United States) Robert Blattner (United States) James McClure	(Czechoslovakia) Stanislav Kolář (Czechoslovakia) Okter Petrisek	(Kingdom of Hungary) Tibor Házi (Kingdom of Hungary) Ferenc Soos
Men's Doubles	(United States) Robert Blattner (United States) James McClure	(Czechoslovakia) Stanislav Kolář (Czechoslovakia) Okter Petrisek	(Czechoslovakia) Karel Fleischner (Czechoslovakia) Adolf Šlár
Women's Doubles	(Czechoslovakia) Marie Kettnerová (Czechoslovakia) Marie Šmídová	(Czechoslovakia) Vlasta Depetrisová (Czechoslovakia) Věra Votrubcová	(United States) Ruth Aarons (United States) Jessie Purves
Women's Doubles	(Czechoslovakia) Marie Kettnerová (Czechoslovakia) Marie Šmídová	(Czechoslovakia) Vlasta Depetrisová (Czechoslovakia) Věra Votrubcová	(Kingdom of Hungary) Magda Gál (Kingdom of Hungary) Mária Mednyánszky
Mixed Doubles	(Czechoslovakia) Miloslav Hamr (Czechoslovakia) Gertrude Kleinová	(Kingdom of Hungary) István Kelen (Kingdom of Hungary) Mária Mednyánszky	(Nazi Germany) Helmut Ullrich (Nazi Germany) Annemarie Schulz
Mixed Doubles	(Czechoslovakia) Miloslav Hamr (Czechoslovakia) Gertrude Kleinová	(Kingdom of Hungary) István Kelen (Kingdom of Hungary) Mária Mednyánszky	(Czechoslovakia) Stanislav Kolář (Czechoslovakia) Marie Šmídová
