= 1935 World Table Tennis Championships – Women's doubles =

1935 Women's doubles

The 1935 World Table Tennis Championships women's doubles was the eighth edition of the women's doubles championship. Mária Mednyánszky and Anna Sipos defeated Marie Kettnerová and Marie Šmídová in the final by three sets to one to record a sixth consecutive world title.

== Results ==
Round of 16
(Nazi Germany) Hilde Bussmann (England) Lena Booker	3
(Lithuania) Birute Nasvytyte (England) Daphne Roberts	0
(Wales) P Ivins (Wales) Nancy Evans-Roy	1
(France) Didi Tugendhat (France) Marguerite de Tenaud	3
(Kingdom of Hungary) Magda Gál (England) Dora Emdin	3
(England) Margaret Osborne (England) Wendy Woodhead	0
(England) Phyllis Moser (England) Dinah Newey	0
(Czechoslovakia) Marie Kettnerová (Czechoslovakia) Marie Šmídová	3
(Republic of Ireland) Evelyn Yeates (United States) Helen Ovenden	0
(Nazi Germany) Astrid Krebsbach (Nazi Germany) Anita Felguth-Denker	3
(England) Valerie Bromfield (England) Constance Wheaton	3
(France) Carmen Delarue (France) Marcelle Delacour	0
(Kingdom of Hungary) Mária Mednyánszky (Kingdom of Hungary) Anna Sipos	3
(Wales) B. Morgan (Wales) Dolly Evans	0
(Czechoslovakia) Gertrude Kleinová (England) Kathleen Berry	3
(Republic of Ireland) Eileen McMahon (Republic of Ireland) Tineke Whelan	0

Quarterfinals
(Nazi Germany) Bussman (England) Booker	21	22	21
(France) Tugendhat (France) de Tenaud	16	20	13
(Kingdom of Hungary) Gál (England) Emdin	19	21	16	21	20
(Czechoslovakia) Kettnerová (Czechoslovakia) Šmídová	21	19	21	15	22
(Nazi Germany) Krebsbach (Nazi Germany) Felguth-Denker	21	21
(England) Bromfield (England) Wheaton	13	19
(Kingdom of Hungary) Mednyánszky (Kingdom of Hungary) Sipos	21	21	15	21
(Czechoslovakia) Kleinová (England) Berry	15	18	21	14

Semifinals
(Nazi Germany) Bussman (England) Booker	21	12	11	15
(Czechoslovakia) Kettnerová (Czechoslovakia) Šmídová	17	21	21	21
(Nazi Germany) Krebsbach (Nazi Germany) Felguth-Denker	16	16	12
(Kingdom of Hungary) Mednyánszky (Kingdom of Hungary) Sipos	21	21	21

Final
(Czechoslovakia) Kettnerová (Czechoslovakia) Šmídová	11	21	11	15
(Kingdom of Hungary) Mednyánszky (Kingdom of Hungary) Sipos	21	18	21	21

== See also ==
- List of World Table Tennis Championships medalists
