= 1935 World Table Tennis Championships – Mixed doubles =

1935 Mixed doubles

The 1935 World Table Tennis Championships mixed doubles was the ninth edition of the mixed doubles championship.

Viktor Barna and Anna Sipos defeated Stanislav Kolář and Marie Kettnerová in the final by three sets to one.

== Results ==
Round of 16
(Kingdom of Hungary) Miklós Szabados (Kingdom of Hungary) Mária Mednyánszky	3
(Kingdom of Hungary) Laszlo Bellak (England) Kathleen Berry	2
(Czechoslovakia) Miloslav Hamr (Czechoslovakia) Gertrude Kleinová	3
(England) Ken Hyde (England) Nora Norrish	1
(Czechoslovakia) Stanislav Kolář (Czechoslovakia) Marie Kettnerová	3
(France) Raoul Bedoc (France) Marcelle Delacour	0
(Kingdom of Hungary) Tibor Házi (Kingdom of Hungary) Magda Gál	w/o
(England) Tommy Sears (Wales) Nancy Evans-Roy	scr
(Kingdom of Hungary) Viktor Barna (Kingdom of Hungary) Anna Sipos	3
(United States) Jimmy McClure (United States) Helen Ovenden	0
(France) Raymond Verger (France) Marguerite De Tenaud	3
(France) Michel Haguenauer (England) Lillian Hutchings	1
(Czechoslovakia) Karel Svoboda (Czechoslovakia) Marie Šmídová	3
(England) Alec Brook (England) Doris Emdin	0
(England) Adrian Haydon (England) Margaret Osborne	3
(Republic of Ireland) Cyril Kemp (Republic of Ireland) Eileen McMahon	0

Quarterfinals
(Kingdom of Hungary) Szabados (Kingdom of Hungary) Mednyánszky	21	21	21
(Czechoslovakia) Hamr (Czechoslovakia) Kleinová	14	15	11
(Czechoslovakia) Kolář (Czechoslovakia) Kettnerová	21	21	14	23
(Kingdom of Hungary) Házi (Kingdom of Hungary) Gál	16	11	21	21
(Kingdom of Hungary) Barna (Kingdom of Hungary) Sipos	21	21	21
(France) Verger (France) De Tenaud	9	6	17
(Czechoslovakia) Svoboda (Czechoslovakia) Šmídová	22	8	15	13
(England) Haydon (England) Osborne	20	21	21	21

Semifinals
(Kingdom of Hungary) Szabados (Kingdom of Hungary) Mednyánszky	17	21	17	19
(Czechoslovakia) Kolář (Czechoslovakia) Kettnerová	21	15	21	21
(Kingdom of Hungary) Barna (Kingdom of Hungary) Sipos	21	19	17	21	21
(England) Haydon (England) Osborne	17	21	21	19	11

Final
(Czechoslovakia) Kolář (Czechoslovakia) Kettnerová	19	13	23	16
(Kingdom of Hungary) Barna (Kingdom of Hungary) Sipos	21	21	21	21

== See also ==
List of World Table Tennis Championships medalists
