= 1936 World Table Tennis Championships – Women's doubles =

1936 Women's doubles
- Venue: Prague

The 1936 World Table Tennis Championships women's doubles was the ninth edition of the women's doubles championship. Marie Šmídová and Marie Kettnerová defeated Věra Votrubcová and Vlasta Depetrisová in the final by three sets to one.

== Results ==
Round of 16
(Kingdom of Hungary) Ida Ferenczy (Kingdom of Hungary) Magda Kiraly	21	21	11	19	21
(Germany) Annemarie Schulz (Germany) Anita Felguth	15	13	21	21	23
(Czechoslovakia) Marie Kettnerová (Czechoslovakia) Marie Šmídová	20	21	21	21
(England) Margaret Osborne (England) Wendy Woodhead	22	17	16	17
(Czechoslovakia) Gertrude Kleinová (Czechoslovakia) Jindriska Holubkova	3
(Czechoslovakia) Hamplova (Czechoslovakia) Krucka	0
(United States) Ruth Aarons (United States) Jessie Purves	w/o
(Czechoslovakia) Pavlikova (Czechoslovakia) Kralikova	scr
(Kingdom of Hungary) Mária Mednyánszky (Kingdom of Hungary) Magda Gál	3
(Austria) Gertrude Wildam (Austria) Rakousko	0
(Lithuania) Birute Nasvytyte (Lithuania) Stefanija Astrauskaite	14	21	21	17	21
(United States) Corinne Migneco (Czechoslovakia) Anna Braunová	21	16	14	21	15
(England) Lillian Hutchings (England) Dinah Newey	1
(Czechoslovakia) Věra Votrubcová (Czechoslovakia) Vlasta Depetrisová	3
(Germany) Astrid Krebsbach (Germany) Hilde Bussmann	w/o
(Czechoslovakia) Sestry (Czechoslovakia) Adela Loydlova	scr

Quarterfinals
(Germany) Schulz (Germany) Felguth	2
(Czechoslovakia) Kettnerová (Czechoslovakia) Šmídová	3
(Czechoslovakia) Kleinová (Czechoslovakia) Holoubkova	21	14	12	19
(United States) Aarons (United States) Purves	5	21	21	21
(Kingdom of Hungary) Mednyánszky (Kingdom of Hungary) Gál	3
(Lithuania) Nasvytyte (Lithuania) Astrauskaite	0
(Czechoslovakia) Votrubcová (Czechoslovakia) Depetrisová	3	1
(Germany) Krebsbach (Germany) Bussmann	0

Semifinals
(Czechoslovakia) Kettnerová (Czechoslovakia) Šmídová
(United States) Aarons (United States) Purves
(Kingdom of Hungary) Mednyánszky (Kingdom of Hungary) Gál	1
(Czechoslovakia) Votrubcová (Czechoslovakia) Depetrisová	3

Final
(Czechoslovakia) Kettnerová (Czechoslovakia) Šmídová	21	21	13	21
(Czechoslovakia) Votrubcová (Czechoslovakia) Depetrisová	14	18	21	14

== See also ==
List of World Table Tennis Championships medalists
