= 1936 World Table Tennis Championships – Women's team =

1936 Corbillon Cup (women's team)
- Venue: Prague

The 1936 World Table Tennis Championships – Corbillon Cup (women's team) was the third edition of the women's team championship.

Czechoslovakia won the gold medal with a perfect 9–0 round robin match record. Germany and the United States tied for the silver medal with a 7–2 record. No bronze medal was awarded.

== Final table ==
Pos	Team	P	W	L	Squad
1	Czechoslovakia	9	9	0	Marie Kettnerová, Marie Šmídová, Gertrude Kleinová, Věra Votrubcová
2	United States	9	7	2	Ruth Aarons, Jessie Purves, Corinne Migneco
2	(Nazi Germany) Germany	9	7	2	Hilde Bussmann, Anita Felguth, Astrid Krebsbach
4	Austria	9	6	3	Gertrude Pritzi, von Benes, Gertrude Wildam
5	(Kingdom of Hungary) Hungary	9	5	4	Magda Gál, Mária Mednyánszky, Ida Ferenczy, Magda Kiraly
5	England	9	5	4	Dinah Newey, Lillian Hutchings, Margaret Osborne, Wendy Woodhead
7	France	9	3	6	Carmen Delarue, Ginette Soulage
8	Belgium	9	2	7	Mary Stevens, Josee Evrard
9	Netherlands	9	1	8	Aartje Kappelhoff, Clara Van West, Telma Kiek
10	Lithuania	9	0	9	Birute Nasvytyte, Stefanija Astrauskaite, Genovaite Miuleraite

== See also ==
List of World Table Tennis Championships medalists
