= 1934 World Table Tennis Championships – Women's doubles =

1934 Women's doubles

The 1934 World Table Tennis Championships women's doubles was the seventh edition of the women's doubles championship. The Championships were held in December 1933 but are officially listed as the 1934 Championships. Mária Mednyánszky and Anna Sipos defeated Anita Felguth-Denker and Astrid Krebsbach in the final by three sets to one to secure a fifth consecutive title.

== Results ==
Round of 16
(Kingdom of Hungary) Mária Mednyánszky (Kingdom of Hungary) Anna Sipos
bye
(England) Nora Norrish (England) Margaret Osborne	w/o
(France) Didi Tughendat (France) Salentin ?	scr
(Nazi Germany) Mona Müller-Rüster (Nazi Germany) Annemarie Haensch
bye
(Czechoslovakia) Marie Šmídová (Czechoslovakia) Marie Kettnerová	3
(Belgium) Cranz (France) Monique Ravigneaux	0
(Nazi Germany) Hilde Bussmann (Kingdom of Hungary) Magda Gál	w/o
(Czechoslovakia) Jozka Veselska (Czechoslovakia) ?	scr
(England) Kathleen Berry (England) Wendy Woodhead	3
(England) Joyce Bartholomew (France) Salentin?	0
(France) Marguerite de Tenaud (France) Yvonne Fayard
bye
(Nazi Germany) Astrid Krebsbach (Nazi Germany) Anita Felguth-Denker	3
(England) Dora Emdin (England) Doris Emdin	0

Quarterfinals
(Kingdom of Hungary) Mednyánszky (Kingdom of Hungary) Sipos	3
(England) Norrish (England) Osborne	0
(Nazi Germany) Müller-Rüster (Nazi Germany) Haensch	1
(Czechoslovakia) Šmídová (Czechoslovakia) Kettnerová	3
(Nazi Germany) Bussmann (Kingdom of Hungary) Gál	3
(England) Berry (England) Woodhead	1
(France) de Tenaud (France) Fayard	0
(Nazi Germany) Krebsbach (Nazi Germany) Felguth-Denker	3

Semifinals
(Kingdom of Hungary) Mednyánszky (Kingdom of Hungary) Sipos	3
(Czechoslovakia) Šmídová (Czechoslovakia) Kettnerová	1
(Nazi Germany) Bussmann (Kingdom of Hungary) Gál	2
(Nazi Germany) Krebsbach (Nazi Germany) Felguth-Denker	3

Final
(Kingdom of Hungary) Mednyánszky (Kingdom of Hungary) Sipos	13	22	21	21
(Nazi Germany) Krebsbach (Nazi Germany) Felguth-Denker	21	20	14	17

== See also ==
List of World Table Tennis Championships medalists
