= 1937 World Table Tennis Championships – Men's doubles =

1937 Men's doubles
- Venue: Baden bei Wien

The 1937 World Table Tennis Championships men's doubles was the eleventh edition of the men's doubles championship. Jimmy McClure and Buddy Blattner won a second successive title after defeating Richard Bergmann and Helmut Goebel in the final by three sets to two.

== Results ==
Round of 16
(Czechoslovakia) Stanislav Kolář (Czechoslovakia) Bohumil Váňa	21	21	14	21
(Austria) Erich Kaspar (Austria) Ferdinand Schuech	5	8	21	16
(England) Adrian Haydon (England) Andrew Millar	19	21	21	13	12
(United States) Jimmy McClure (United States) Buddy Blattner	21	18	15	21	21
(Kingdom of Hungary) Miklós Szabados (Kingdom of Hungary) Viktor Barna	w/o
(Egypt) Tawid Helal (Egypt) Hassan Abou Heif	scr
(France) Charles Dubouillé (France) Michel Haguenauer	11	13	21	12
(Czechoslovakia) Miloslav Hamr (Czechoslovakia) František Hanec Pivec	21	21	18	21
(United States) Sol Schiff (United States) Abe Berenbaum	24	21	21
(Austria) Alfred Liebster (Poland) Alojzy Ehrlich	22	12	18
(Czechoslovakia) Adolf Šlár (Czechoslovakia) Václav Tereba	21	18	23	22
(Austria) Herbert Wunsch (Austria) Ed Arie	19	21	21	20
(Austria) Richard Bergmann (Austria) Helmut Goebel	24	21	21	21
(Czechoslovakia) Pavel Löwy (Czechoslovakia) Sramek	26	13	11	8
(Austria) Otto Pfefferbaum (Austria) Karl Schediwy	6	20	21	21	13
(Kingdom of Hungary) Ferenc Soos (Kingdom of Hungary) Laszlo Bellak	21	22	19	15	21

Quarterfinals
(Czechoslovakia) Kolář (Czechoslovakia) Váňa	21	16	18	21	14
(United States) McClure (United States) Blattner	16	21	21	15	21
(Kingdom of Hungary) Szabados (Kingdom of Hungary) Barna	21	16	16	21	13
(Czechoslovakia) Hamr (Czechoslovakia) Pivec	18	21	21	17	21
(United States) Schiff (United States) Berenbaum	19	17	21	19
(Czechoslovakia) Šlár (Czechoslovakia) Tereba	21	21	12	21
(Austria) Bergmann (Austria) Goebel	19	14	21	22	21
(Kingdom of Hungary) Soos (Kingdom of Hungary) Bellak	21	21	15	20	18

Semifinals
(United States) McClure (United States) Blattner	3
(Czechoslovakia) Hamr (Czechoslovakia) Pivec	2
(Czechoslovakia) Šlár (Czechoslovakia) Tereba	0
(Austria) Bergmann (Austria) Goebel	3

Final
(United States) McClure (United States) Blattner	19	19	22	21	21
(Austria) Bergmann (Austria) Goebel	21	21	20	13	11

== See also ==
List of World Table Tennis Championships medalists
