= 1936 World Table Tennis Championships – Men's doubles =

1936 Men's doubles
- Venue: Prague

The 1936 World Table Tennis Championships men's doubles was the tenth edition of the men's doubles championship. Jimmy McClure and Buddy Blattner defeated Stanislav Kolář and Okter Petrisek in the final by three sets to nil.

== Results ==
Round of 16
(Kingdom of Hungary) Miklós Szabados (Kingdom of Hungary) Viktor Barna	17	21	14	21	16
(France) Raoul Bedoc (France) Michel Haguenauer	21	14	21	15	21
(Czechoslovakia) Adolf Šlár (Czechoslovakia) Karel Fleischner	3
(Czechoslovakia) Schulz (Czechoslovakia) Roubicek	1
(Czechoslovakia) Stanislav Kolář (Czechoslovakia) Okter Petrisek
(Lithuania) Vytautas Gerulaitis (Lithuania) Vilius Variakojis
(Kingdom of Hungary) István Boros (Kingdom of Hungary) Béla Nyitrai
(Czechoslovakia) Vaclav Frana (Czechoslovakia) Sebastak
(United States) Jimmy McClure (United States) Buddy Blattner
(Romania) Viktor Vladone (Romania) Farkas Paneth
(Kingdom of Hungary) István Kelen (Kingdom of Hungary) Laszlo Bellak	3
(Czechoslovakia) Vaclav Schneberger (Czechoslovakia) Sramek	1
(Kingdom of Hungary) Tibor Házi (Kingdom of Hungary) Ferenc Soos	3
(England) Maurice Bergl (England) Stanley Proffitt	1
(Socialist Federal Republic of Yugoslavia) Max Marinko (Socialist Federal Republic of Yugoslavia) Lazar	3
(Czechoslovakia) Franz Zdarsky (Czechoslovakia) Johoda	1

Quarterfinals
(France) Bedoc (France) Haguenauer	1
(Czechoslovakia) Šlár (Czechoslovakia) Fleischner	3
(Czechoslovakia) Kolář (Czechoslovakia) Petrisek	3
(Kingdom of Hungary) Boros (Kingdom of Hungary) Nyitrai	0
(United States) Blattner (United States) McClure	3
(Kingdom of Hungary) Kelen (Kingdom of Hungary) Bellak	2
(Kingdom of Hungary) Soos (Kingdom of Hungary) Házi	3
(Socialist Federal Republic of Yugoslavia) Marinko (Socialist Federal Republic of Yugoslavia) Lazar	0

Semifinals
(Czechoslovakia) Šlár (Czechoslovakia) Fleischner	2
(Czechoslovakia) Kolář (Czechoslovakia) Petrisek	3
(United States) Blattner (United States) McClure	13	21	21	23	21
(Kingdom of Hungary) Soos (Kingdom of Hungary) Házi	21	23	11	21	18

Final
(Czechoslovakia) Kolář (Czechoslovakia) Petrisek	11	7	9
(United States) Blattner (United States) McClure	21	21	21

== See also ==
List of World Table Tennis Championships medalists
