= 1935 World Table Tennis Championships =

The 1935 World Table Tennis Championships were held at the Imperial Institute, South Kensington in London with the finals at the Wembley Sports Arena, from February 8 to February 16, 1935.

The championships attracted 19 countries and the finals attendance was in excess of 8,000.

== Medalists ==
=== Team ===
Event	Gold	Silver	Bronze
Swaythling Cup; Men's team	Hungary; Viktor Barna; Laszlo Bellak; Tibor Házi; István Kelen; Miklós Szabados	Czechoslovakia; Miloslav Hamr; Stanislav Kolář; Karel Svoboda; Viktor Tobiasch; Bohumil Váňa	Austria; Erwin Kohn; Alfred Liebster; Karl Schediwy; Ferry Weiss
Swaythling Cup; Men's team	Hungary; Viktor Barna; Laszlo Bellak; Tibor Házi; István Kelen; Miklós Szabados	Czechoslovakia; Miloslav Hamr; Stanislav Kolář; Karel Svoboda; Viktor Tobiasch; Bohumil Váňa	Poland; Alojzy Ehrlich; Władysław Loewenhertz; Simon Pohoryles
Corbillon Cup; Women's team	Czechoslovakia; Marie Kettnerová; Gertrude Kleinová; Marie Šmídová	Hungary; Magda Gál; Mária Mednyánszky; Anna Sipos	Germany; Hilde Bussmann; Anita Felguth; Astrid Krebsbach

=== Individual ===
Event	Gold	Silver	Bronze
Men's Singles	(Kingdom of Hungary) Viktor Barna	(Kingdom of Hungary) Miklós Szabados	(Poland) Alojzy Ehrlich
Men's Singles	(Kingdom of Hungary) Viktor Barna	(Kingdom of Hungary) Miklós Szabados	(Austria) Erwin Kohn
Women's singles	(Czechoslovakia) Marie Kettnerová	(Kingdom of Hungary) Magda Gál	(France) Marcelle Delacour
Women's singles	(Czechoslovakia) Marie Kettnerová	(Kingdom of Hungary) Magda Gál	(Czechoslovakia) Marie Šmídová
Men's Doubles	(Kingdom of Hungary) Viktor Barna (Kingdom of Hungary) Miklós Szabados	(England) Adrian Haydon (Austria) Alfred Liebster	(Kingdom of Hungary) Laszlo Bellak (Kingdom of Hungary) István Kelen
Men's Doubles	(Kingdom of Hungary) Viktor Barna (Kingdom of Hungary) Miklós Szabados	(England) Adrian Haydon (Austria) Alfred Liebster	(France) Raoul Bedoc (France) Daniel Guérin
Women's Doubles	(Kingdom of Hungary) Mária Mednyánszky (Kingdom of Hungary) Anna Sipos	(Czechoslovakia) Marie Kettnerová (Czechoslovakia) Marie Šmídová	(Nazi Germany) Anita Felguth (Nazi Germany) Astrid Krebsbach
Women's Doubles	(Kingdom of Hungary) Mária Mednyánszky (Kingdom of Hungary) Anna Sipos	(Czechoslovakia) Marie Kettnerová (Czechoslovakia) Marie Šmídová	(England) Mrs L. Booker (Nazi Germany) Hilde Bussmann
Mixed Doubles	(Kingdom of Hungary) Viktor Barna (Kingdom of Hungary) Anna Sipos	(Czechoslovakia) Stanislav Kolář (Czechoslovakia) Marie Kettnerová	(England) Adrian Haydon (England) Margaret Osborne
Mixed Doubles	(Kingdom of Hungary) Viktor Barna (Kingdom of Hungary) Anna Sipos	(Czechoslovakia) Stanislav Kolář (Czechoslovakia) Marie Kettnerová	(Kingdom of Hungary) Miklós Szabados (Kingdom of Hungary) Mária Mednyánszky
