= 1934 World Table Tennis Championships – Mixed doubles =

1934 Mixed doubles

The 1934 World Table Tennis Championships mixed doubles was the eighth edition of the mixed doubles championship. The Championships were held in December 1933 but are officially listed as the 1934 Championships.

Miklós Szabados and Mária Mednyánszky defeated Viktor Barna and Anna Sipos in the final by three sets to one.

== Results ==
Round of 16
(Kingdom of Hungary) Miklós Szabados (Kingdom of Hungary) Mária Mednyánszky	3
(England) Herbert 'Willie' Hales (England) Doris Emdin	0
(France) Henri Bolelli (France) Yvonne Fayard	2
(England) Eric Findon (England) Wendy Woodhead	3
(England) Ken Hyde (England) Margaret Osborne	3
(Poland) Alojzy Ehrlich (France) Maroutchka Azcue de Lezo	2
(England) Andrew Millar (England) Dora Emdin	1
(Czechoslovakia) Stanislav Kolář (Czechoslovakia) Marie Šmídová	3
(Kingdom of Hungary) Laszlo Bellak (England) Kathleen Berry	3
(Kingdom of Hungary) Sandor Glancz (Kingdom of Hungary) Magda Gál	1
(France) Raymond Verger (France) Marguerite De Tenaud	3
(England) Don Foulis (England) Nora Norrish	1
(Czechoslovakia) Miloslav Hamr (Czechoslovakia) Marie Kettnerová	3
(France) Roger Worth (France) Jacqueline Foy	1
(India) Wishnu Kirloskar (Nazi Germany) Hilde Bussmann	1
(Kingdom of Hungary) Viktor Barna (Kingdom of Hungary) Anna Sipos	3

Quarterfinals
(Kingdom of Hungary) Szabados (Kingdom of Hungary) Mednyánszky	3
(England) Findon (England) Woodhead	0
(England) Hyde (England) Osborne	0
(Czechoslovakia) Kolář (Czechoslovakia) Šmídová	3
(Kingdom of Hungary) Bellak (England) Berry	21	19	21	16	21
(France) Verger (France) De Tenaud	13	21	16	21	15
(Czechoslovakia) Hamr (Czechoslovakia) Kettnerová	15	21	11	19
(Kingdom of Hungary) Barna (Kingdom of Hungary) Sipos	21	17	21	21

Semifinals
(Kingdom of Hungary) Szabados (Kingdom of Hungary) Mednyánszky	19	21	21	21	21
(Czechoslovakia) Kolář (Czechoslovakia) Šmídová	21	13	13	23	19
(Kingdom of Hungary) Bellak (England) Berry	10	21	12	19
(Kingdom of Hungary) Barna (Kingdom of Hungary) Sipos	21	14	21	21

Final
(Kingdom of Hungary) Szabados (Kingdom of Hungary) Mednyánszky	17	21	22	22
(Kingdom of Hungary) Barna (Kingdom of Hungary) Sipos	21	12	20	20

== See also ==
List of World Table Tennis Championships medalists
