= 1935 World Table Tennis Championships – Men's team =

1935 Swaythling Cup (men's team)

The 1935 World Table Tennis Championships – Swaythling Cup (men's team) was the ninth edition of the men's team championship.

Hungary won the gold medal again after defeating Czechoslovakia 5–3 in the final. A new format for the competition consisted of two groups with the group winners progressing to the final. The runner-up for both groups received a bronze medal.

== Swaythling Cup tables ==
=== Group 1 ===
Pos	Team	P	W	L	Squad
1	(Kingdom of Hungary) Hungary	8	8	0	Viktor Barna, Laszlo Bellak, Tibor Házi, István Kelen, Miklós Szabados
2	Austria	8	7	1	Erwin Kohn, Alfred Liebster, Karl Schediwy, Ferry Weiss
3	France	8	5	3	Raoul Bedoc, Raymond Furman, Daniel Guérin, Michel Haguenauer, Raymond Verger
4	Latvia	8	4	4	Mordecai Finberg, Arnold Oschin, Doerin Stamms
4	Lithuania	8	4	4	Vladas Dzindziliauskas, Vytautas Gerulaitis, Eugenijus Nikolskis, Juozas Remeikis,
4	(Socialist Federal Republic of Yugoslavia) Yugoslavia	8	4	4	Borivoj Građanski, Ladislav Hexner, Stevica Maksimović
7	United States	8	3	5	Gilbert Marshall, Jimmy McClure, Sol Schiff, Bill Stewart
8	Belgium	8	1	7	Jules Carton, Robert Eymael, Max Kahn
9	(Republic of Ireland) Irish Free State	8	0	8	C Bonynge, Dermot Hennessey, C J Hussey,
10	Germany+	0	0	0	

+ withdrew

=== Group 2 ===
Pos	Team	P	W	L	Squad
1	Czechoslovakia	7	7	0	Miloslav Hamr, Stanislav Kolář, Karel Svoboda, Viktor Tobiasch, Bohumil Váňa
2	Poland	7	6	1	Alojzy Ehrlich, Władysław Loewenhertz, Simon Pohoryles
3	England	7	5	2	Maurice Bergl, Adrian Haydon, David Jones, Andrew Millar
4	India	7	3	4	Mohammed Ayub, Jimmy Dass, A Guha
4	Switzerland	7	3	4	
6	Wales	7	2	5	
7	Northern Ireland	7	1	6	
8	Netherlands	7	0	7	
9	Romania +	0	0	0	

+ withdrew

== Final ==
Hungary 5	Czechoslovakia 3	Scores
Bellak	Hamr	2–0
Bellak	Kolář	1–2
Bellak	Svoboda	2–1
Barna	Kolář	2–0
Barna	Svoboda	2–0
Szabados	Svoboda	1-2
Szabados	Hamr	1-2
Szabados	Kolář	2-0

== See also ==
List of World Table Tennis Championships medalists
