= 1937 World Table Tennis Championships – Men's singles =

1937 Men's singles
- Venue: Baden bei Wien

The 1937 World Table Tennis Championships men's singles was the 11th edition of the men's singles championship.

Richard Bergmann defeated Alojzy Ehrlich in the final, winning three sets to two to secure the title.

== Results ==
Round of 16
(United States) Robert Blattner	21	21	21
(England) Stanley Proffitt	17	11	12
(Hungary) Ferenc Soos	21	17	21	21
(Socialist Federal Republic of Yugoslavia) Ladislav Hexner	16	21	13	16
(Hungary) Tibor Házi	21	18	18	21	21
(Egypt) Marcel Geargoura	18	21	21	11	13
(Poland) Alojzy Ehrlich	21	21	21
(Czechoslovakia) Stanislav Kolář	11	16	16
(Austria) Richard Bergmann	21	21	21
(Czechoslovakia) Miloslav Hamr	17	14	19
(Poland) Shimcha Finkelstein	22	21	21
(Hungary) Miklós Szabados	20	18	17
(Austria) Hans Hartinger	21	21	21
(Poland) Samuel Schieff	10	18	12
(Czechoslovakia) Bohumil Váňa	w/o

Quarterfinals
(United States) Blattner	20	21	23	17	20
(Hungary) Soos	22	15	21	21	22
(Hungary) Hazi	13	15	21	13
(Poland) Erlich	21	21	13	21
(Austria) Bergmann	21	21	21
(Poland) Finkelstein	12	18	14
(Austria) Hartinger	21	19	14	21	21
(Czechoslovakia) Váňa	17	21	21	15	15

Semifinals
(Hungary) Soos	20	9	13
(Poland) Erlich	22	21	21
(Austria) Bergmann	15	16	21	21	21
(Austria) Hartinger	21	21	13	15	16

Final
(Poland) Erlich	21	21	21	14	11
(Austria) Bergmann	19	23	19	21	21

== 1937 World Rankings ==
- 1 (Czechoslovakia) Stanislav Kolář
- 2 (Poland) Alojzy Ehrlich
- 3 (Austria) Richard Bergmann
- 4 (France) Michel Haguenauer
- 5 (Hungary) Miklós Szabados
- 6 (Hungary) Laszlo Bellak
- 7 (Hungary) Viktor Barna
- 8 (England) Adrian Haydon
- 9 (Austria) Alfred Liebster
- 10 (Romania) Marin Vasile-Goldberger

== See also ==
List of World Table Tennis Championships medalists
