= 1937 World Table Tennis Championships – Mixed doubles =

1937 Mixed doubles
- Venue: Baden bei Wien

The 1937 World Table Tennis Championships mixed doubles was the 11th edition of the mixed doubles championship.

Bohumil Váňa and Věra Votrubcová defeated Stanislav Kolář and Marie Kettnerová in the final by three sets to nil.

== Results ==
Round of 16
(Romania) Geza Eros (Romania) Angelica Adelstein	3
(Czechoslovakia) Sramek (Czechoslovakia) Podhajecka	0
(Kingdom of Hungary) István Boros (Kingdom of Hungary) Ida Ferenczy	w/o
(Kingdom of Hungary) Laszlo Bellak (Kingdom of Hungary) Anna Sipos	scr
(Czechoslovakia) Stanislav Kolář (Czechoslovakia) Marie Kettnerová	3
(Kingdom of Hungary) Viktor Barna (Kingdom of Hungary) Magda Gál	1
(Czechoslovakia) Adolf Šlár (Czechoslovakia) Vlasta Depetrisová	3
(England) Adrian Haydon (England) Margaret Osborne	1
(England) Maurice Bergl (England) Lillian Hutchings	3
(Kingdom of Hungary) István Kelen (Kingdom of Hungary) Mária Mednyánszky	2
(United States) Abe Berenbaum (United States) Emily Fuller	3
(Kingdom of Hungary) Ferenc Soos (Kingdom of Hungary) Dora Beregi	0
(United States) Sol Schiff (United States) Jessie Purves	1
(Czechoslovakia) Bohumil Váňa (Czechoslovakia) Věra Votrubcová	3
(Austria) Karl Schediwy (Austria) Gertrude Pritzi	3
(England) Andrew Millar (England) Constance Wheaton	2

Quarterfinals
(Romania) Eros (Romania) Adelstein	21	10	14	21	22
(Kingdom of Hungary) Boros (Kingdom of Hungary) Ferenczy	11	21	21	18	20
(Czechoslovakia) Kolář (Czechoslovakia) Kettnerová	10	21	19	21	21
(Czechoslovakia) Šlár (Czechoslovakia) Depetrisová	21	17	21	16	18
(England) Bergl (England) Hutchings	17	9	19
(United States) Berenbaum (United States) Fuller	21	21	21
(Czechoslovakia) Váňa (Czechoslovakia) Votrubcová	21	21	21
(Austria) Schediwy (Austria) Pritzi	15	19	16

Semifinals
(Romania) Eros (Romania) Adelstein	0
(Czechoslovakia) Kolář (Czechoslovakia) Kettnerová	3
(United States) Berenbaum (United States) Fuller	1
(Czechoslovakia) Váňa (Czechoslovakia) Votrubcová	3

Final
(Czechoslovakia) Kolář (Czechoslovakia) Kettnerová	21	21	15
(Czechoslovakia) Váňa (Czechoslovakia) Votrubcová	21	21	21

== See also ==
- List of World Table Tennis Championships medalists
