= 1935 World Table Tennis Championships – Women's singles =

1935 Women's singles

The 1935 World Table Tennis Championships women's singles was the ninth edition of the women's singles championship. Marie Kettnerová defeated Magda Gál in the final by three sets to one, to win the title.

== Results ==
Round of 16
(Kingdom of Hungary) Magda Gál	3
(England) Joyce Bartholomew	0
(Nazi Germany) Astrid Krebsbach	3
(England) Dora Emdin	0
(Czechoslovakia) Marie Šmídová	3
(England) L D Milne	0
(England) Constance Wheaton	w/o
(Wales) E.F. Davis
(England) Margaret Osborne	3
(Nazi Germany) Hilde Bussmann	1
(Czechoslovakia) Marie Kettnerová	3
(Kingdom of Hungary) Mária Mednyánszky	0
(Czechoslovakia) Gertrude Kleinová	3
(England) Valerie Bromfield	2
(Nazi Germany) Anita Felguth	0
(France) Marcelle Delacour	3

Quarterfinals
(Kingdom of Hungary) Gál	3
(Nazi Germany) Krebsbach	11
(Czechoslovakia) Šmídová	3
(England) Wheaton	0
(England) Osborne	2
(Czechoslovakia) Kettnerová	3
(Czechoslovakia) Kleinová	1
(France) Delacour	3

Semifinals
(Kingdom of Hungary) Gál	21	21	21
(Czechoslovakia) Šmídová	12	13	12
(Czechoslovakia) Kettnerová	21	21	21
(France) Delacour	6	9	4

Final
(Kingdom of Hungary) Gál	21	18	11	19
(Czechoslovakia) Kettnerová	15	21	21	21

== See also ==
List of World Table Tennis Championships medalists
