= 1937 World Table Tennis Championships – Women's team =

1937 Corbillon Cup (women's team)
- Venue: Baden bei Wien

The 1937 World Table Tennis Championships – Corbillon Cup (women's team) was the fourth edition of the women's team championship.

United States won the gold medal with a perfect 8–0 round robin match record. Germany won the silver medal and Czechoslovakia took the bronze medal.

== Final table ==
Pos	Team	P	W	L	Squad
1	United States	8	8	0	Ruth Aarons, Emily Fuller, Dolores Kuenz, Jessie Purves
2	(Nazi Germany) Germany	8	7	1	Hilde Bussmann, Astrid Hobohm-Krebsbach, Annemarie Schulz
3	Czechoslovakia	8	6	2	Vlasta Depetrisová, Marie Kettnerová, Podhajecka, Věra Votrubcová
4	Austria	8	5	3	Gertrude Pritzi, von Benes, Zita Lemo, Gertrude Wildam
5	England	9	5	4	Margaret Osborne, Wendy Woodhead, Constance Wheaton, Doris Jordan
6	France	8	3	5	Jeanne Delay, Ginette Soulage
7	Romania	8	2	6	Angelica Adelstein, Nagy, Foris, Maretz
8	(Kingdom of Hungary) Hungary	8	1	7	Magda Gál, Anna Sipos, Ida Ferenczy, Magda Kiraly
9	Belgium	8	0	8	Mary Stevens, Marie-Josee Schaal

== See also ==
List of World Table Tennis Championships medalists
