= 1934 World Table Tennis Championships – Women's singles =

1934 Women's singles (held in December 1933)

The 1934 World Table Tennis Championships women's singles was the eighth edition of the women's singles championship. The Championships were held in December 1933 but are officially listed as the 1934 Championships. Marie Kettnerová defeated Astrid Krebsbach in the final by three sets to one, to win the title.

== Results ==
Round of 16
(Czechoslovakia) Marie Kettnerová	3
(France) Nicole Foy	0
(England) Nora Norrish	2
(England) Kathleen Berry	3
(Kingdom of Hungary) Anna Sipos	3
(Nazi Germany) Annemarie Haensch	2
(France) Geneviéve Blandin	1
(England) Dora Emdin	3
(Kingdom of Hungary) Magda Gál	3
(England) Doris Emdin	0
(England) Wendy Woodhead	3
(England) L D Milne	0
(Czechoslovakia) Marie Šmídová	3
(Kingdom of Hungary) Mária Mednyánszky	1
(England) Joyce Bartholomew	0
(Nazi Germany) Astrid Krebsbach	3

Quarterfinals
(Czechoslovakia) Kettnerova	3
(England) Berry	0
(Kingdom of Hungary) Sipos	1
(England) Emdin	3
(Kingdom of Hungary) Gál	3
(England) Woodhead	0
(Czechoslovakia) Šmídová	0
(Nazi Germany) Krebsbach	3

Semifinals
(Czechoslovakia) Kettnerova	3
(England) Emdin	2
(Kingdom of Hungary) Gál	1
(Nazi Germany) Krebsbach	3

Final
(Czechoslovakia) Kettnerova	21	21	21	21
(Nazi Germany) Krebsbach	18	15	23	18

== See also ==
List of World Table Tennis Championships medalists
