= 1937 World Table Tennis Championships – Women's doubles =

1937 Women's doubles
- Venue: Baden bei Wien

The 1937 World Table Tennis Championships women's doubles was the tenth edition of the women's doubles championship. Věra Votrubcová and Vlasta Depetrisová defeated Wendy Woodhead and Margaret Osborne in the final by three sets to nil.

== Results ==
Round of 16
(England) Lillian Hutchings (Austria) Stefanie Werle	21	21	14	21
(Austria) Zita Lemo (Austria) Gertrude Pritzi	19	16	21	18
(France) Ginette Soulage (France) Jeanne Delay	8	22	21	12	23
(Kingdom of Hungary) Ida Ferenczy (Kingdom of Hungary) Dora Beregi	21	20	15	21	21
(Czechoslovakia) Věra Votrubcová (Czechoslovakia) Vlasta Depetrisová	21	21	21
(Nazi Germany) Astrid Krebsbach-Hobohm (Nazi Germany) Hilde Bussmann	15	14	16
(England) Constance Wheaton (England) Doris Jordan	21	18	21	13	21
(Kingdom of Hungary) Mária Mednyánszky (Kingdom of Hungary) Anna Sipos	19	21	16	21	18
(Czechoslovakia) Marie Kettnerová (Czechoslovakia) Marie Šmídová	w/o
(Kingdom of Hungary) Magda Kiraly (Kingdom of Hungary) Magda Gál	21	21	21
(Austria) Tabak (Austria) Schwanzer	17	12	9
(England) Margaret Osborne (England) Wendy Woodhead	21	16	17	21	21
(Czechoslovakia) Gertrude Kleinová (Czechoslovakia) Podhajecka	18	21	21	15	14
(Austria) Gertrude Wildam (Austria) von Benes	17	22	21	21
(Socialist Federal Republic of Yugoslavia) Ana Alaker (Socialist Federal Republic of Yugoslavia)	21	20	18	13

Quarterfinals
(England) Hutchings (Austria) Werle	22	14	21	21
(France) Soulage (France) Delay	20	21	18	15
(Czechoslovakia) Votrubcová (Czechoslovakia) Depetrisová	21	21	21
(England) Wheaton (England) Jordan	12	8	13
(Czechoslovakia) Kettnerová (Czechoslovakia) Šmídová	14	21	21	17	21
(Kingdom of Hungary) Kiraly (Kingdom of Hungary) Gál	21	9	15	21	15
(England) Osborne (England) Woodhead	3
(Austria) Wildam (Austria) von Benes	0

Semifinals
(England) Hutchings (Austria) Werle	0
(Czechoslovakia) Votrubcová (Czechoslovakia) Depetrisová	3
(Czechoslovakia) Kettnerová (Czechoslovakia) Šmídová	2
(England) Osborne (England) Woodhead	3

Final
(Czechoslovakia) Votrubcová (Czechoslovakia) Depetrisová	21	21	21
(England) Osborne (England) Woodhead	16	18	17

== See also ==
List of World Table Tennis Championships medalists
