= 1935 World Table Tennis Championships – Women's team =

1935 Corbillon Cup (women's team)

The 1935 World Table Tennis Championships – Corbillon Cup (women's team) was the second edition of the women's team championship.

Czechoslovakia won the gold medal beating Hungary in a play off final 3–1 after both teams finish with a 9–1 round robin match record.

== Final table ==
Pos	Team	P	W	L	Squad
1	Czechoslovakia	10	9	1	Marie Kettnerová, Marie Šmídová, Gertrude Kleinová
2	(Kingdom of Hungary) Hungary	10	9	1	Magda Gál, Mária Mednyánszky, Anna Sipos
3	(Nazi Germany) Germany	10	8	2	Hilde Bussmann, Anita Felguth, Astrid Krebsbach
4	England	10	7	3	Valerie Bromfield, Dora Emdin, Margaret Osborne, Wendy Woodhead
4	France	10	7	3	Carmen Delarue, Marguerite De Tenaud, Marcelle Delacour, Didi Tughendat
6	Wales	10	5	5	Nancy Evans-Roy, P Ivins, B Morgan
7	Switzerland	10	4	6	Margrit Isely, Betty Wyss
8	Netherlands	10	2	8	Aartje Kappelhoff, Marie-Helene Sohn, Clara Van West
8	(Republic of Ireland) Irish Free State	10	2	8	Eileen McMahon, Tineke Whelan, Evelyn Yeates
8	Belgium	10	2	8	Nina Degryse, Grauls, Marie-Josee Schaal, Marcelle Zweiffel
11	United States	10	0	5	Helen Ovenden, Julie Ruth

=== Final ===
Czechoslovakia 3		(Kingdom of Hungary) Hungary 1	Score
Kettnerová	bt	Mednyánszky	21-10 21-12
Šmídová	bt	Mednyánszky	21-15 21-13
Šmídová	bt	Sipos	21-8 22-20
Kettnerová & Šmídová	lost to	Mednyánszky & Sipos	15-21 21-16 16-21

== See also ==
List of World Table Tennis Championships medalists
