= 1937 World Table Tennis Championships – Women's singles =

1937 Women's singles
- Venue: Baden bei Wien

The 1937 World Table Tennis Championships women's singles was the 11th edition of the women's singles championship. Ruth Aarons and Gertrude Pritzi competed in the final which ended in an anticlimax because both players were stopped from finishing the final under the new time limit rules and declared joint champions.

== Results ==
Round of 16
(United States) Ruth Aarons	21	21	21
(Romania) Nagy	11	14	11
(Nazi Germany) Astrid Hobohm Krebsbach	21	21	21
(Austria) Beyerl	10	17	6
(England) Lillian Hutchings	12	19	21	21	21
(Czechoslovakia) Gertrude Kleinová	21	21	14	17	10
(Kingdom of Hungary) Anna Sipos	17	16	21	13
(Czechoslovakia) Marie Kettnerová	21	21	19	21
(Czechoslovakia) Vlasta Depetrisová	21	24	21	21	23
(United States) Jessie Purves	17	22	19	14	21
(Nazi Germany) Hilde Bussmann	21	21	21
(England) Wendy Woodhead	15	9	12
(Czechoslovakia) Věra Votrubcová	w/o
(Czechoslovakia) Jindriska Holubkova
(Austria) Gertrude Pritzi	16	22	22	21
(Romania) Angelica Adelstein	21	20	20	17

Quarterfinals
(United States) Aarons	3
(Nazi Germany) Hobohm Krebsbach	1
(England) Hutchings	16	16	17
(Czechoslovakia) Kettnerová	21	21	21
(Czechoslovakia) Depetrisová	21	15	16	16
(Nazi Germany) Bussmann	15	21	21	21
(Czechoslovakia) Votrubcova	20	16	21	16
(Austria) Pritzi	22	21	18	21

Semifinals
(United States) Aarons	3
(Czechoslovakia) Kettnerová	2
(Nazi Germany) Bussmann	1
(Austria) Pritzi	3

Final
(United States) Aarons	12	21	16+
(Austria) Pritzi	21	8	19+

+ match ended under time limit rules

== See also ==
List of World Table Tennis Championships medalists
