= 1936 World Table Tennis Championships – Women's singles =

1936 Women's singles
- Venue: Prague

The 1936 World Table Tennis Championships women's singles was the tenth edition of the women's singles championship. Ruth Aarons defeated Astrid Krebsbach in the final by three sets to nil, to win the title.

== Results ==
Round of 16
(United States) Ruth Aarons	21	22	22
(Austria) Gertrude Wildam	16	11	12
(Hungary) Magda Kiraly-Baba	19	21	21	19	21
(Czechoslovakia) Věra Votrubcová	21	14	12	21	11
(England) Margaret Osborne	19	21	16	21	21
(Czechoslovakia) Rauova	21	17	21	7	8
(Hungary) Mária Mednyánszky	14	11	16
(Czechoslovakia) Marie Kettnerová	21	21	21
(Czechoslovakia) Marie Šmídová	3
(England) Wendy Woodhead	0
(Hungary) Magda Gál	3
(Czechoslovakia) Podhajecka	1
(Czechoslovakia) Koudelova	3
(England) Lillian Hutchings	1
(Germany) Astrid Krebsbach	21	21	21
(United States) Corinne Migneco	11	19	14

Quarterfinals
(United States) Aarons	21	21	21
(Hungary) Kiraly	12	14	14
(England) Osborne	19	15	15
(Czechoslovakia) Kettnerová	21	21	21
(Czechoslovakia) Šmídová	3
(Hungary) Gál	2
(Czechoslovakia) Koudelova	2
(Germany) Krebsbach	3

Semifinals
(United States) Aarons	3
(Czechoslovakia) Kettnerová	1
(Czechoslovakia) Šmídová	0
(Germany) Krebsbach	3

Final
(United States) Aarons	21	21	21
(Germany) Krebsbach	16	14	11

== See also ==
List of World Table Tennis Championships medalists
