= 1934 World Table Tennis Championships – Women's team =

1934 Corbillon Cup (women's team)

The 1934 World Table Tennis Championships – Corbillon Cup (women's team) was the first edition of the women's team championship.

The cup was named the Corbillon Cup because it was named after Marcel Corbillon (the President of the French Table Tennis Association (FFTT) from 1933 to 1935) who donated the trophy for the winning team. Germany won the gold medal with a 5–0 record in the round robin group. Hungary won the silver medal and Czechoslovakia won the bronze medal.

== Corbillon Cup results ==
Team one	Team two	Score
Germany	England	3-1
Germany	France	3-1
Germany	Netherlands	3-0
Germany	Hungary	3-2
Germany	Czechoslovakia	3-2
England	France	3-1
England	Netherlands	3-0
England	Hungary	0-3
England	Czechoslovakia	1-3
France	Netherlands	3-0
France	Hungary	0-3
France	Czechoslovakia	1-3
Netherlands	Hungary	0-3
Netherlands	Czechoslovakia	0-3
Hungary	Czechoslovakia	3-2

== Final table ==
Pos	Team	P	W	L	Squad
1	(Nazi Germany) Germany	5	5	0	Anita Felguth, Annemarie Haensch, Astrid Krebsbach, Mona Muller
2	(Kingdom of Hungary) Hungary	5	4	1	Magda Gál, Mária Mednyánszky, Anna Sipos
3	Czechoslovakia	5	3	2	Marie Kettnerová, Marie Šmídová, Jozka Veselska
4	England	5	2	3	Dora Emdin, Nora Norrish, Margaret Osborne, Wendy Woodhead
5	France	5	1	4	Yvonne Fayard, Marguerite De Tenaud, Monique Ravigneaux, Didi Tughendat
6	Netherlands	5	0	5	Loes Hiltrop, Aartje Kappelhoff, Marie-Helene Sohn

== See also ==
List of World Table Tennis Championships medalists
