= 1936 World Table Tennis Championships – Men's singles =

1936 Men's singles
- Venue: Prague

The 1936 World Table Tennis Championships men's singles was the tenth edition of the men's singles championship.

Stanislav Kolář defeated Alojzy Ehrlich in the final, winning three sets to two to secure the title.

== Results ==
Round of 16
(Poland) Alojzy Ehrlich	3
(Czechoslovakia) Bohumil Váňa	0
(United States) Gilbert Marshall	21	22	21	21	22
(Hungary) István Boros	18	24	19	23	20
(Austria) Richard Bergmann	21	21	23
(Germany) Dieter Mauritz	14	15	21
(England) Adrian Haydon	3
(Hungary) Laszlo Bellak	1
(Poland) Samuel Schieff	3
(Romania) Marin Vasile-Goldberger	0
(Czechoslovakia) Stanislav Kolář	3
(Czechoslovakia) G Novak	1
(Hungary) Ferenc Soos	21	21	22
(England) Ken Hyde	15	9	11
(Latvia) Isays Joffe	3
(England) Stanley Proffitt	1

Quarterfinals
(Poland) Erlich	21	21	24
(United States) Marshall	9	19	22
(Austria) Bergmann	21	21	26
(England) Haydon	9	7	24
(Poland) Sziff	21	16	19	9
(Czechoslovakia) Kolar	19	21	21	21
(Hungary) Soos	21	21	21
(Latvia) Joffe	14	18	2

Semifinals
(Poland) Erlich	16	21	21	21
(Austria) Bergmann	21	16	18	10
(Czechoslovakia) Kolar	21	18	21	21
(Hungary) Soos	18	21	12	19

Final
(Poland) Erlich	21	14	21	12	19
(Czechoslovakia) Kolar	19	21	16	21	21

== See also ==
List of World Table Tennis Championships medalists
