= 1935 World Table Tennis Championships – Men's singles =

1935 Men's singles

The 1935 World Table Tennis Championships men's singles was the ninth edition of the men's singles championship.

Viktor Barna defeated Miklós Szabados in the final, winning three sets to two to secure a fourth consecutive title.

== Results ==
Round of 16
(Hungary) Tibor Házi | 21 | 21 | 21
(Austria) Erwin Kohn | 14 | 14 | 19
(England) Maurice Bergl | 22 | 21 | 18 | 21
(Latvia) Doerin Stamms | 20 | 18 | 21 | 16
(Hungary) Miklós Szabados | 21 | 21 | 21
(Austria) Alfred Liebster | 4 | 19 | 14
(Hungary) Lajos Dávid | 22 | 21 | 21 | 21 | 17
(Czechoslovakia) Miloslav Hamr | 24 | 18 | 13 | 23 | 21
(Hungary) Viktor Barna | 21 | 21 | 20 | 21
(Switzerland) P. Tagliabue | 12 | 8 | 22 | 4
(Czechoslovakia) Stanislav Kolář | 18 | 21 | 21 | 19 | 21
(France) Raoul Bedoc | 21 | 15 | 9 | 21 | 12
(Czechoslovakia) Bohumil Váňa | 21 | 21 | 22
(Poland) Alojzy Ehrlich | 14 | 18 | 20
(Hungary) Laszlo Bellak | 21 | 21 | 21
(England) Hyman Lurie | 6 | 18 | 16

Quarterfinals
(Austria) Kohn | 21 | 10 | 18 | 21 | 21
(England) Bergl | 13 | 21 | 21 | 19 | 9
(Hungary) Szabados | 21 | 19 | 22 | 22
(Czechoslovakia) Hamr | 16 | 21 | 20 | 20
(Hungary) Barna | 21 | 17 | 21 | 21
(Czechoslovakia) Kolar | 16 | 21 | 16 | 11
(Poland) Erlich | 21 | 15 | 21 | 21
(Hungary) Bellak | 15 | 21 | 12 | 19

Semifinals
(Austria) Kohn | 13 | 14 | 18
(Hungary) Szabados | 21 | 21 | 21
(Hungary) Barna | 12 | 21 | 22 | 21
(Poland) Erlich | 21 | 11 | 20 | 15

Final
(Hungary) Szabados | 21 | 17 | 21 | 11 | 19
(Hungary) Barna | 17 | 21 | 19 | 21 | 21

== See also ==
List of World Table Tennis Championships medalists
