= 1934 World Table Tennis Championships =

The 8th World Table Tennis Championships were held in Paris from December 2 to 10, 1933. The Championships were held in December 1933 but are officially listed as the 1934 Championships.

== Medalists ==
=== Team ===
Event	Gold	Silver	Bronze
Swaythling Cup; Men's team	Hungary; Viktor Barna; Laszlo Bellak; Lajos Dávid; Tibor Házi; Miklós Szabados	Austria; Erwin Kohn; Alfred Liebster; Karl Schediwy	
Swaythling Cup; Men's team	Hungary; Viktor Barna; Laszlo Bellak; Lajos Dávid; Tibor Házi; Miklós Szabados	Czechoslovakia; Oldrich Blecha; Miloslav Hamr; Erwin Koln-Korda; Stanislav Kolář; Karel Svoboda	
Corbillon Cup; Women's team	Germany; Anita Felguth; Annemarie Haensch; Astrid Krebsbach; Mona Muller	Hungary; Magda Gál; Mária Mednyánszky; Anna Sipos	Czechoslovakia; Marie Kettnerová; Marie Šmídová; Jozka Veselska

=== Individual ===
Event	Gold	Silver	Bronze
Men's singles	(Kingdom of Hungary) Viktor Barna	(Kingdom of Hungary) Laszlo Bellak	(Kingdom of Hungary) Tibor Házi
Men's singles	(Kingdom of Hungary) Viktor Barna	(Kingdom of Hungary) Laszlo Bellak	(Kingdom of Hungary) Miklós Szabados
Women's singles	(Czechoslovakia) Marie Kettnerová	(Nazi Germany) Astrid Krebsbach	(England) Dora Emdin
Women's singles	(Czechoslovakia) Marie Kettnerová	(Nazi Germany) Astrid Krebsbach	(Kingdom of Hungary) Magda Gál
Men's doubles	(Kingdom of Hungary) Viktor Barna (Kingdom of Hungary) Miklós Szabados	(Kingdom of Hungary) Sándor Glancz (Kingdom of Hungary) Tibor Házi	(Kingdom of Hungary) István Boros (Kingdom of Hungary) Béla Nyitrai
Men's doubles	(Kingdom of Hungary) Viktor Barna (Kingdom of Hungary) Miklós Szabados	(Kingdom of Hungary) Sándor Glancz (Kingdom of Hungary) Tibor Házi	(Czechoslovakia) Miloslav Hamr (Czechoslovakia) Erwin Koln-Korda
Women's doubles	(Kingdom of Hungary) Mária Mednyánszky (Kingdom of Hungary) Anna Sipos	(Nazi Germany) Anita Felguth (Nazi Germany) Astrid Krebsbach	(Czechoslovakia) Marie Šmídová (Czechoslovakia) Marie Kettnerová
Women's doubles	(Kingdom of Hungary) Mária Mednyánszky (Kingdom of Hungary) Anna Sipos	(Nazi Germany) Anita Felguth (Nazi Germany) Astrid Krebsbach	(Nazi Germany) Hilde Bussmann (Kingdom of Hungary) Magda Gál
Mixed doubles	(Kingdom of Hungary) Miklós Szabados (Kingdom of Hungary) Mária Mednyánszky	(Kingdom of Hungary) Viktor Barna (Kingdom of Hungary) Anna Sipos	(Czechoslovakia) Stanislav Kolář (Czechoslovakia) Marie Šmídová
Mixed doubles	(Kingdom of Hungary) Miklós Szabados (Kingdom of Hungary) Mária Mednyánszky	(Kingdom of Hungary) Viktor Barna (Kingdom of Hungary) Anna Sipos	(Kingdom of Hungary) Laszlo Bellak (England) Kathleen Berry
