= Adalbert Rethi =

Romanian table tennis player

Adalbert Rethi (6 May 1943, Târgu Mureș - 14 October 2008, Hungary) was an ethnic Hungarian table tennis player from Romania.

While playing for Dinamo Târgu Mureș he was discovered by Farkas Paneth, who took him to CSM Cluj. His first international success was at the 1959 Youth Table Tennis European Championship, where he won the doubles competition with Radu Negulescu. At the 1962 Youth European Championship he won a silver medal in the doubles competition, and a bronze in the singles competition.

In the national championships he won 16 titles, among them three in the singles competition four in the doubles with Radu Negulescu, one in the mixed with Eleonora Mihalcă and the rest as a team member of CSM Cluj (alongside Dorin Giurgiuca, Radu Negulescu, etc.), a team with which he won five European Club Cup Championships. Between 1959 and 1967 he participated in five World Table Tennis Championships and several Table Tennis European Championships.

== Private ==
Adalbert Rethi was the son of an officer's family. After high school, he studied law at the Babeș-Bolyai University in Cluj, and became a lawyer. In 1972 he married his first wife and emigrated to Hungary, to Cegléd. Later he married a second time. In 2008 he died after a long illness, leaving behind two children.

== Awards ==
Master of Sports, 1964

== Results from the ITTF-databank ==
Representing	Tournament	Year	City	Country	Singles	Doubles	Mixed	Team
ROU	Balkan Games	1968	Skopje	YUG		silver	gold	
ROU	Balkan Games	1967	Antalya	TUR		gold	silver	
ROU	Balkan Games	1965	Sofia	BUL	silver	silver		1
ROU	Balkan Games	1964	Athen	GRE				1
ROU	Balkan Games	1963	Athen	GRE	gold	silver		
ROU	European Championship	1968	Lyon	FRA		quarter finals		
ROU	European Championship	1966	London	ENG			quarter finals	
ROU	Youth European Championship	1962	Bled	YUG	semi finals	silver		
ROU	Youth European Championship	1959	Constanta	ROU		gold		
ROU	World Championship	1967	Stockholm	SWE	last 64	last 16	last 128	9
ROU	World Championship	1965	Ljubljana	YUG	last 64	last 64	did not play	11
ROU	World Championship	1963	Prague	TCH	last 32	last 128	last 16	13
ROU	World Championship	1961	Peking	CHN	last 64	last 16	quarter finals	8
ROU	World Championship	1959	Dortmund	FRG	last 64	last 32	did not play	9
