= Valerie Bromfield =

British table tennis player

Personal information
- Nationality: England
- Born: 26 March 1912 Edmonton, London, England
- Died: 1996 Bexley, London, England

Valerie Lilian Bromfield (26 March 1912 – 1996) was a female English international table tennis player.

== Table tennis career ==
She won two English Open titles in 1931. She won the women's singles and mixed doubles with Sándor Glancz.

She represented England as part of the women's team for the 1935 Corbillon Cup (women's world team event). The team consisting of Dora Emdin, Margaret Osborne and Wendy Woodhead just outside of the medals and finished in fourth place.

== Personal life ==
Her father was Percival Bromfield (1926 world team champion) and they played mixed doubles together. She married John Law in 1938 and re-married to Robert MacConnachie in 1964.

== See also ==
- List of England players at the World Team Table Tennis Championships
