= 1933 World Table Tennis Championships =

1933 World Table Tennis Championships may refer to:

- 1933 World Table Tennis Championships (January), held in Baden bei Wien
- 1933 World Table Tennis Championships (December), held in London
