= Paul Wolschoefer =

French table tennis player

Personal information
- Nationality: France
Medal record
Representing France
World Table Tennis Championships
Bronze medal – third place	1936	Men's team

Paul Wolschoefer is a male former French international table tennis player.

He won a bronze medal at the 1936 World Table Tennis Championships in the Swaythling Cup (men's team event) with Raoul Bedoc, Michel Haguenauer, Charles Dubouillé and Daniel Guérin for France.

== See also ==
- List of table tennis players
- List of World Table Tennis Championships medalists
