= Viktor Tobiasch =

Czech table tennis player

Personal information
- Nationality: Czech Republic
Medal record
Representing Czechoslovakia
Silver medal – second place	1935	Men's Team

Viktor Tobiasch is a male former Czech international table tennis player.

He won a silver medal at the 1935 World Table Tennis Championships in the Swaythling Cup (men's team event) with Miloslav Hamr, Stanislav Kolář, Karel Svoboda and Bohumil Váňa for Czechoslovakia.

== See also ==
- List of table tennis players
- List of World Table Tennis Championships medalists
