= Radu Negulescu =

Romanian table tennis player

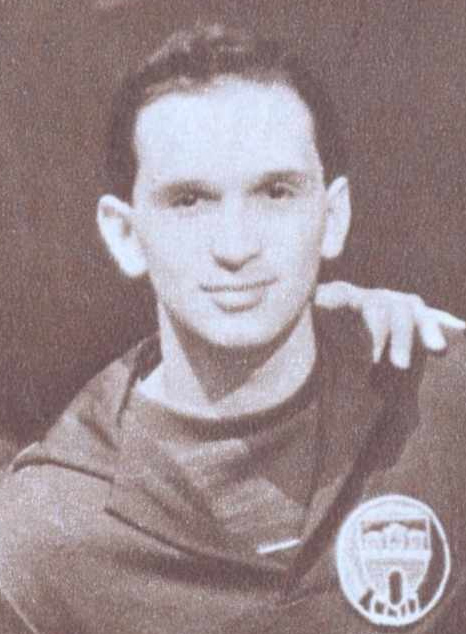
Negulescu in 1965

Radu Negulescu (born 22 March 1941, in Bistrița) is a former Romanian table tennis player who won 23 national and 17 international titles.

He started playing table tennis at the age of nine. In his youth, he also played soccer and handball at the national level, and basketball at the local level. In 1956, he placed second in the youth national championship. After graduating from high school, he moved to Cluj and joined the table tennis division of Progresul, where he was coached by Farkas Paneth.

In 1958 and 1959, he won the individual and doubles youth national championships.

Between 1959 and 1968, he won six individual national championships, one mixed, five doubles, and 10 team national championships.

In 1958, he became the youth European champion in the individual, doubles and mixed competitions.

Between 1961 and 1967, he won five times the European Club Cup of Champions with his team, CSM Cluj (alongside Adalbert Rethi, Dorin Giurgiuca and others).

In the Balkan Games, he won three gold medals (two in the doubles and one in the mixed competitions).

He participated in 5 editions of the Table Tennis World Championships.

A gynecologist and a doctorate holder, he defected with his wife to West Germany in 1981, leaving his two children behind. After nine months the children were allowed by the Romanian communist authorities to join their parents in Germany.

In Germany he worked first as a table tennis coach before he found a job as a doctor. He changed his name to Johann R. Wolff, and practiced medicine in Pulheim. After the Romanian Revolution of 1989, he was a visiting professor at his alma mater, the "Iuliu Hatieganu" School of Medicine and Pharmacy, Cluj.

== Awards ==
- Master of Sports (1960)
- Honored Master of Sports (1999)

== Book ==
Radu Negulescu, “Viitorul vine din trecut”, 2010
