= Șerban Doboși =

Romanian table tennis player

Personal information
- Nationality: Romania
- Born: October 25, 1951; Cluj

Șerban Andrei Doboși (born October 25, 1951, Cluj) is a former Romanian International table tennis player.

== Table tennis career ==
Playing for CSM Cluj, where he was coached by Farkas Paneth, he participated in five World Table Tennis Championships.

After he retired from active play in 1982, he was named head coach of the Romanian men's national table tennis team.

== Personal life ==
A graduate of the Cluj Sports Academy, he is, as of 2014, a professor at the Babeș-Bolyai University, Cluj-Napoca, Faculty of Physical Education and Sport, and holds leading posts at the Romanian Table Tennis Federation.

== See also ==
- List of table tennis players

== Achievements ==
- 3 national youth titles (individual)
- 5 national titles (individual)
- 9 national titles (double; including youth)
- 13 national team titles
- 6 Balkan Games titles
