= Okter Petrisek =

Czechoslovak table tennis player

Personal information
- Full name: Okter J. Petrisek
- Nationality: Czechoslovakia
Medal record
Representing Czechoslovakia
World Table Tennis Championships
Silver medal – second place	1936	Doubles

Okter Petrisek was a male international table tennis player from Czechoslovakia.

He won a silver medal at the 1936 World Table Tennis Championships in the men's doubles, teaming with Stanislav Kolář.

== See also ==
- List of table tennis players
- List of World Table Tennis Championships medalists
