= Dinah Newey =

English table tennis player (1914–1993)

Personal information
- Nationality: England
- Born: 18 March 1914; Kings Norton, Worcestershire, England
- Died: 21 November 1993 (aged 79); Corvallis, Oregon, U.S.

Dinah Newey (18 March 1914 – 21 November 1993) was an English international table tennis player.

== Table tennis career ==
Newey represented England as part of the women's team for the 1936 Corbillon Cup (women's world team event). The team consisting of Lillian Hutchings, Margaret Osborne, Wendy Woodhead finished in equal fifth place.

Newey represented Birmingham at club level and reached the last 16 of the women's doubles during the 1935 and 1936 World Championships.

== Personal life and death ==
Newey was born in Kings Norton, Worcestershire, near Birmingham on 18 March 1914, to William Onion and Gladys Kingwell.

Newey married Gilbert Albert Smith in Birmingham 1939. He died in 1966, at the age of 55. She later married Mervyn Kingwell in Birmingham on 11 September 1969, and then emigrated to the United States, settling in Waldport, Oregon by 1970. Newey died in Corvallis, Oregon on 21 November 1993, at the age of 79.
