= Charles Dubouillé =

French table tennis player (born 1918)

Personal information
- Nationality: France
- Born: 1918 (age 107–108)
Medal record
Representing France
World Table Tennis Championships
Bronze medal – third place	1936	Men's team
Silver medal – second place	1948	Men's team

Charles Dubouillé (born 1918) was a French international table tennis player.

Dubouillé won a bronze medal at the 1936 World Table Tennis Championships in the Swaythling Cup (men's team event) with Raoul Bedoc, Michel Haguenauer, Paul Wolschoefer and Daniel Guérin for France. Twelve years later he won a silver medal at the 1948 World Table Tennis Championships in the Swaythling Cup (men's team event).

Dubouillé won two national singles titles.

== See also ==
- List of table tennis players
- List of World Table Tennis Championships medalists
