= Dolores Kuenz =

American table tennis player

Personal information
- Nationality: United States
Medal record
Representing United States
World Table Tennis Championships
Gold medal – first place	1937	team

Dolores Probert Kuenz was an international table tennis player from the United States.

== Table tennis career ==
She won a World Championship gold medal in the Women's Team event at the 1937 World Table Tennis Championships known as the Corbillon Cup. she was the captain of the team.

== Hall of Fame ==
She was inducted into the USA Hall of Fame in 1979.

== See also ==
- List of table tennis players
- List of World Table Tennis Championships medalists
