= Annemarie Schulz =

German table tennis player

Personal information
- Nationality: Germany
Medal record
Representing Germany
World Table Tennis Championships
Bronze medal – third place	1933	Women's doubles
Bronze medal – third place	1933	Mixed doubles
Bronze medal – third place	1936	Mixed doubles
Bronze medal – third place	1937	Women's doubles
Bronze medal – third place	1937	Women's team

Annemarie Schulz was a female international table tennis player from Germany.

She won five World Championship medals starting with two bronze medals at the 1933 World Table Tennis Championships in the women's doubles with Anita Felguth and in the mixed doubles with Nikita Madjaroglou.

This was followed by another bronze in the mixed doubles at the 1936 World Table Tennis Championships with Helmut Ullrich and then two more in the 1937 World Table Tennis Championships in the team event and doubles with Marie Kettnerová.

== See also ==
- List of table tennis players
- List of World Table Tennis Championships medalists
