= Annemarie Haensch =

German table tennis player

Personal information
- Nationality: Germany
- Born: 2 January 1904
- Died: 25 January 1968 (aged 64)
Medal record
Representing Germany
World Table Tennis Championships
| Gold medal – first place | 1934 | Team |

Annemarie Haensch was a German international table tennis player.

== Table tennis career ==
She won a gold medal in the team event at the 1934 World Table Tennis Championships for Germany, with Anita Felguth, Astrid Krebsbach and Mona Rüster Muller.

== See also ==
- List of table tennis players
- List of World Table Tennis Championships medalists
