= Istvan Lovaszy =

Hungarian table tennis player

Personal information
- Nationality: Hungary
Medal record
Representing Hungary
World Table Tennis Championships
Silver medal – second place	1937	Men's Team

Istvan Lovaszy is a former international table tennis player from Hungary.

== Table tennis career ==
Lovaszy won a silver medal at the 1937 World Table Tennis Championships in the Swaythling Cup (men's team event) with Viktor Barna, Laszlo Bellak, Ferenc Soos and Miklós Szabados.

== See also ==
- List of table tennis players
- List of World Table Tennis Championships medalists
