= Stefanie Werle =

Austrian table tennis player

Personal information
- Nationality: Austria
Medal record
Representing Austria
World Table Tennis Championships
Bronze medal – third place	1937	Women's doubles

Stefanie Werle was a female international table tennis player from Austria.

She won a bronze medal at the 1937 World Table Tennis Championships in the women's doubles with Lillian Hutchings.

== See also ==
- List of table tennis players
- List of World Table Tennis Championships medalists
