= Ferry Weiss =

Austrian table tennis player

Personal information
- Nationality: Austria
Medal record
Representing Austria
World Table Tennis Championships
Bronze medal – third place	1933	Men's team
Bronze medal – third place	1935	Men's team

Ferry Weiss was a male Austrian international table tennis player.

== Table tennis career ==
He won two bronze medals at the 1933 World Table Tennis Championships and the 1935 World Table Tennis Championships in the Swaythling Cup (men's team event).

He was coached by Paul Flussmann at his Vienna club.

== See also ==
- List of table tennis players
- List of World Table Tennis Championships medalists
