= Nora Norrish =

English table tennis player

Personal information
- Nationality: England

Nora Norrish was a female international table tennis player from England.

== Table tennis career ==
She represented England as part of the women's team for the 1934 Corbillon Cup (women's world team event) (held in December 1933). The team consisting of Dora Emdin, Margaret Osborne and Wendy Woodhead just outside of the medals and finished in fourth place.

She set a women's record of four Liverpool Championships from 1933 to 1936.

== Personal life ==
She represented Bootle at club level.

== See also ==
- List of England players at the World Team Table Tennis Championships
