= Simon Pohoryles =

Polish table tennis player

Personal information
- Nationality: Poland
Medal record
Representing Poland
Bronze medal – third place	1935	Men's Team

Simon Pohoryles is a male former Polish international table tennis player.

He won a bronze medal at the 1935 World Table Tennis Championships in the Swaythling Cup (men's team event) with Alojzy Ehrlich and Władysław Loewenhertz for Poland.

Along with his teammates they were the first Polish medal winners at the Championships.

== See also ==
- List of table tennis players
- List of World Table Tennis Championships medalists
