= Pavel Löwy =

Czech table tennis player

Personal information
- Nationality: Czech Republic
Medal record
Representing Czechoslovakia
World Table Tennis Championships
Bronze medal – third place	1937	Men's Team

Pavel Löwy is a male former Czech international table tennis player.

== Table tennis career ==
He won a bronze medal in the Swaythling Cup (men's team event) at the 1937 World Table Tennis Championships with Miloslav Hamr, Stanislav Kolář, Adolf Šlár, Bohumil Váňa.

== Personal life ==
He was of Jewish origin and played for the Hagibor Prague club. He was sent to a concentration camp during the war and was possibly killed there. There is no record of further table tennis involvement after the war.

== See also ==
- List of table tennis players
- List of World Table Tennis Championships medalists
