= Władysław Loewenhertz =

Polish table tennis player

Personal information
- Nationality: Poland
- Citizenship: Australian
- Born: 10 March 1916 Vienna, Austria
- Died: 11 January 2011 (aged 94) Melbourne, Australia
Medal record
Representing Poland
Bronze medal – third place	1935	Men's Team

Władysław Loewenhertz was a male former Polish international table tennis player and Australian national and state table tennis champion.

He was born in 1916 in Vienna, Austria, to Markus Loewenhertz and Hermina Weisglas. At a young age, his family moved to his father's hometown of Lwow, Poland, where spent the rest of his childhood and young adulthood.

He won a bronze medal at the 1935 World Table Tennis Championships in the Swaythling Cup (men's team event) with Alojzy Ehrlich and Simon Pohoryles for Poland.

Along with his teammates they were the first Polish medal winner at the Championships. He played for the local Jewish sports club Hasmonea Lwów.

Just prior to the onset of World War II, in July 1939, he departed Poland for a new life in Australia, where he adopted the name of Walter Lowen. His table tennis achievements in Australia included winning: the 1948 Australian open singles championship, the 1941, 1948, 1949, 1950 Victorian Open single championship and, late in his life inductions into: Table Tennis Victoria's hall of fame (open division) in 2015 and as the Macabi Victoria's hall of fame in 2000.

== See also ==
- List of table tennis players
- List of World Table Tennis Championships medalists
