= Karel Fleischner =

Czechoslovak table tennis player

Personal information
- Nationality: Czechoslovakia
Medal record
Representing Czechoslovakia
World Table Tennis Championships
Bronze medal – third place	1936	Doubles

Karel Fleischner was a male international table tennis player from Czechoslovakia. He won a bronze medal at the 1936 World Table Tennis Championships in the men's doubles, teaming with Adolf Slar.

Fleishchner was of Jewish origin, and one of a number of Czech athletes who died in Nazi concentration camps.

== See also ==
- List of table tennis players
- List of World Table Tennis Championships medalists
