= Farkas Paneth =

Romanian table tennis player

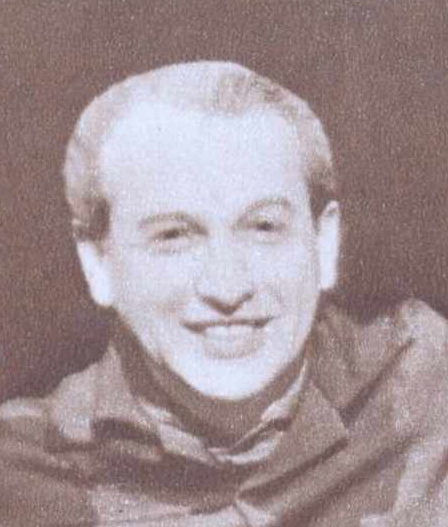
- Farcaș Paneth in 1965

Personal information
- Nationality: Hungary Romania
- Born: 23 March 1917 Bucharest
- Died: 23 June 2009 (aged 92)
Medal record
Representing Romania
World Table Tennis Championships
Silver medal – second place	1936	Men's Team

Farkas Paneth (23 March 1917, Cluj, Austro-Hungary – 23 June 2009, Cluj, Romania) was a Jewish-Romanian table tennis player and coach who played for Romania.

He started playing on a tailoring table using firewood instead of a net.

As a player, he won two Romanian Cup titles, nine national champion titles in the doubles and mixed competitions, and several runner-up prizes in the individual competition.

In 1936, when he was playing Alojzy Ehrlich, a Pole, at the 1936 World Table Tennis Championships in Prague, one of their exchanges lasted for two hours and twelve minutes. The Romanian team (Viktor Vladone, Marin Vasile-Goldberger and Farkas Paneth) won a silver medal in that competition.

He coached both local teams in Cluj and the Romanian national teams, many of his disciples (Angelica Rozeanu, Maria Alexandru, Șerban Doboși, Radu Negulescu, Dorin Giurgiuca, etc.) winning 16 world gold medals and 32 European titles (including youth competitions). While he coached CSM Cluj, his team won the European Club Cup of Champions five times.

A member of a rabbinical family, he managed to escape twice on the way to concentration camps. He was the subject of a documentary movie by Steven Spielberg about the life of the Jews during World War II.

He was an avid stamp collector.

== Awards and honors ==
- "Cultural Merit" Medal for Sport, Second Class (1936)
- Honored Coach (1951)
- "ITTF Merit Award" (1993)
- National Medal for Merit, Third Class (2000)
- Honorary Citizen of Cluj
- A table tennis tournament in Romania is named in his honor

== Books ==
- Paleta și planeta (with Gheorghe I. Bodea), 1997 (first edition), 2003 (second edition)

== See also ==
- List of table tennis players
- List of World Table Tennis Championships medalists
