= Constance Wheaton =

English table tennis player

Personal information
- Nationality: England
- Born: 1908; St Albans, England
- Died: 1964 (aged 55–56); St Albans, England

Constance 'Connie' Wheaton (1908–1964), (married name Brigden), was a female international table tennis player from England.

== Table tennis career ==
She represented England as part of the women's team for the 1937 Corbillon Cup (women's world team event). The team consisting of Margaret Osborne, Wendy Woodhead and Doris Jordan finished in fifth place.

She was two times London Championships winner. and reached the last 16 of the women's doubles during the 1935 and 1937 World Championships and the last 16 of the singles in 1935.

== Personal life ==
She married Leslie Brigden in 1941.

== See also ==
- List of England players at the World Team Table Tennis Championships
