= Shimcha Finkelstein =

Polish-Israeli table tennis player

Personal information
- Native name: שמחה פינקלשטין
- Nationality: Poland; Israel
- Born: 1917 Warsaw
- Died: 1987 (aged 69–70)
Medal record
Representing Poland
Bronze medal – third place	1936	Men's Team

Shimcha Finkelstein (Hebrew: שמחה פינקלשטין; 1917–1987), was a male Polish and Israeli international table tennis player.

== Table tennis career ==
He won a bronze medal at the 1936 World Table Tennis Championships in the Swaythling Cup (men's team event) with Alojzy Ehrlich and Samuel Schieff for Poland.

He was Polish team champion for Hasmonea Warsaw and singles champion in 1937. He was of Jewish origin and before the war switched allegiance to Israel and won the first ever Israeli championship beating Mordecai Finberg in the final.

== Personal life ==
He left Poland in May 1937 via Romania to Israel. He retired in 1967, had three children and died in 1987.

== See also ==
- List of table tennis players
- List of World Table Tennis Championships medalists
