= František Hanec Pivec =

Czech table tennis player

Personal information
- Nationality: Czech Republic
Medal record
Representing Czechoslovakia
World Table Tennis Championships
Bronze medal – third place	1936	Men's Team
Bronze medal – third place	1937	Men's Doubles

František Hanec Pivec was a male Czech international table tennis player.

He won a bronze medal at the 1936 World Table Tennis Championships in the team event and another bronze in 1937 World Table Tennis Championships doubles with Miloslav Hamr.

== See also ==
- List of table tennis players
- List of World Table Tennis Championships medalists
