= Abe Berenbaum =

American table tennis player

Personal information
- Nationality: United States
Medal record
Representing United States
World Table Tennis Championships
Gold medal – first place	1937	Men's team
Bronze medal – third place	1937	Mixed doubles

Abe Berenbaum was an American international table tennis player.

== Table tennis career ==
Berenbaum won a bronze medal in the mixed doubles with Emily Fuller at the 1937 World Table Tennis Championships and a gold medal in the team event at the 1937 World Table Tennis Championships. He also won two English Open titles.

== Hall of Fame ==
Berenbaum was inducted into the USA Hall of Fame in 1979.

== See also ==
- List of table tennis players
- List of World Table Tennis Championships medalists
