= Corinne Migneco =

American table tennis player

Personal information
- Nationality: United States
Medal record
Representing United States
World Table Tennis Championships
Silver medal – second place	1936	Women's team

Corinne Migneco was an American international table tennis player.

Migneco won a silver medal at the 1936 World Table Tennis Championships in the Corbillon Cup (women's team event), with Ruth Aarons and Jessie Purves for the United States.

== See also ==
- List of table tennis players
- List of World Table Tennis Championships medalists
