= Viktor Vladone =

Romanian table tennis player

Personal information
- Nationality: Romania
- Born: 1911 Bucharest
- Died: 2006 (aged 94–95)
Medal record
Representing Romania
World Table Tennis Championships
Silver medal – second place	1936	Men's Team

Viktor Vladone (1911–2006) was a male Romanian international table tennis player.

He won a silver medal at the 1936 World Table Tennis Championships in the men's team event.

He won nine national titles: singles (1936, 1950 and 1952), doubles with Maretz (1935 and 1936), Fiala (1949), Schapira (1938, 1940) and Lucian (1950) and played for YMCA Bucharest (1928–1931), Romania Cluj-Napoca (1932), Electrica Uzinele Cluj-Napoca (1933–1938), Builder Bucharest (1946 - 1948) and SFIPIA Bucharest (1949 - 1953).

Between 1950 and 1970, he was a coach for Romanian players for the World Championships and the European Championships.

== See also ==
- List of table tennis players
- List of World Table Tennis Championships medalists
