= Hans Hartinger =

Austrian table tennis player

Personal information
- Nationality: Austria
Medal record
Representing Austria
World Table Tennis Championships
Gold medal – first place	1936	Men's Team
Bronze medal – third place	1937	Men's Singles

Hans Hartinger was a male Austrian international table tennis player.

He won a gold medal at the 1936 World Table Tennis Championships in the men's team event for Austria and the following year he won a bronze medal in the men's singles at the 1937 World Table Tennis Championships.

== See also ==
- List of table tennis players
- List of World Table Tennis Championships medalists
