= Emily Fuller (table tennis) =

American table tennis player

Personal information
- Nationality: United States
Medal record
Representing United States
World Table Tennis Championships
Gold medal – first place	1937	team
Bronze medal – third place	1937	mixed doubles

Emily Fuller is a former international table tennis player from the United States.

== Table tennis career ==
She won two World Championship medals including a gold medal in the Women's Team event at the 1937 World Table Tennis Championships.

== Hall of Fame ==
She was inducted into the USA Hall of Fame in 1979.

== See also ==
- List of table tennis players
- List of World Table Tennis Championships medalists
