= Doris Emdin =

British table tennis player

Personal information
- Nationality: England
- Born: 5 April 1905
- Died: 1967

Doris Lucy Emdin (5 April 1905 – 1967), was a female English international table tennis player.

== Table tennis career ==
After being eliminated in the first round of the singles event of the 1934 World Championships, she reached the quarter-finals of the 1938 World Championships in the same event.

== Personal life ==
Her younger sister Dora Emdin was also a notable table tennis international.

She married Sidney Hearn in 1956 and died in 1967.

== See also ==
- List of table tennis players
