= Samuel Schieff =

Polish-Israeli table tennis player

Personal information
- Native name: שְׁמוּאֵל שִׁיֵּף
- Nationality: Poland; Israel
Medal record
Representing Poland
Bronze medal – third place	1936	Men's Team

Samuel Schieff (Hebrew: שְׁמוּאֵל שִׁיֵּף) is a male former Polish and Israeli international table tennis player.

He won a bronze medal at the 1936 World Table Tennis Championships in the Swaythling Cup (men's team event) with Alojzy Ehrlich and Shimcha Finkelstein for Poland.

He was ranked Polish number one in the mid-1930s. He was of Jewish origin and following the war represented Israel, alongside his former teammate Finkelstein in the World Championships.

== See also ==
- List of table tennis players
- List of World Table Tennis Championships medalists
