= Helmut Ullrich =

German table tennis player

Personal information
- Nationality: Germany
Medal record
Representing Germany
World Table Tennis Championships
Bronze medal – third place	1936	Mixed Doubles

Helmut Ullrich is a former international table tennis player from Germany.

He won a bronze medal at the 1936 World Table Tennis Championships in the mixed doubles with Annemarie Schulz.

== See also ==
- List of table tennis players
- List of World Table Tennis Championships medalists
