= Kathleen Berry =

English table tennis player

Personal information
- Nationality: England
- Born: c. 1908 Epping, England
Medal record
Representing England
World Table Tennis Championships
Bronze medal – third place	1934	Mixed Doubles

Kathleen Berry (born 1908 or 1909) was a noted English table tennis player who had her first success in a game played at Harrods in February 1922 when she was thirteen.

== Table tennis career ==
Berry's greatest international success was in mixed doubles at the 1934 World Table Tennis Championships where she was paired with Laszlo Bellak. Information about her becomes scarce after her competing in the 1935 World Table Tennis Championships.

Berry competed in the mixed doubles event at the 1926 World Table Tennis Championships with her brother Reginald Henry Berry.

== Tournament wins ==
- 1922 Harrods Open
- 1922/23 Daily Mirror British Championship
- 1924/25 Middlesex Championship
- 1924/25 London League Championship
- 1925/26 Middlesex Championship
- 1925/26 London League Championship

== See also ==
- List of table tennis players
- List of World Table Tennis Championships medalists
