= Marin Vasile-Goldberger =

Romanian table tennis player

Personal information
- Nationality: Romania
Medal record
Representing Romania
World Table Tennis Championships
Silver medal – second place	1936	Men's Team

Marin Vasile-Goldberger was a male Romanian international table tennis player.

He won a silver medal at the 1936 World Table Tennis Championships on the men's team event.

He famously played in a match against Michel Haguenauer that lasted 7 hours 35 minutes before the match was stopped.

== See also ==
- List of table tennis players
- List of World Table Tennis Championships medalists
