= Marcelle Delacour =

French table tennis player

Personal information
- Nationality: France
Medal record
Representing France
World Table Tennis Championships
Bronze medal – third place	1935	Women's Singles

Marcelle Delacour was a female French international table tennis player.

She won a bronze at the 1935 World Table Tennis Championships in the women's singles.

== See also ==
- List of table tennis players
- List of World Table Tennis Championships medalists
