= Maurice Bergl =

English table tennis player

Personal information
- Nationality: England
- Citizenship: British
- Born: 23 January 1917; Russia
- Died: 1998; Bermuda

Maurice Balfour Wright Bergl (23 January 1917 – 1998) was a male English international table tennis player.

== Table tennis career ==
He was a leading international player in England during the 1930s and 1940s. He reached the number 3 ranking in Britain and was runner-up in the English Championship in 1934. He competed in the 1935 World Table Tennis Championships and the 1936 World Table Tennis Championships.

== Personal life ==
He was born in 1917 in Russia and came to England in 1920. He married in 1945. He died in 1998 in Bermuda.

== See also ==
- List of table tennis players
