= Daniel Guérin (table tennis) =

French table tennis player

Personal information
- Nationality: France
Medal record
Representing France
World Table Tennis Championships
Bronze medal – third place	1935	Men's doubles
Bronze medal – third place	1936	Men's team

Daniel Guérin (French pronunciation: [danjɛl ɡeʁɛ̃]) was a male French international table tennis player.

He won a bronze medal at the 1935 World Table Tennis Championships in the men's doubles with Raoul Bedoc. He won another bronze at the 1936 World Table Tennis Championships in the men's team event.

His brother Jean-Claude Guérin was also a table tennis player and their father Dr Charles Guérin was a notable tennis table official and early French champion in fencing.

== See also ==
- List of table tennis players
- List of World Table Tennis Championships medalists
