= Buddy Blattner =

American athlete and broadcaster (1920–2009)

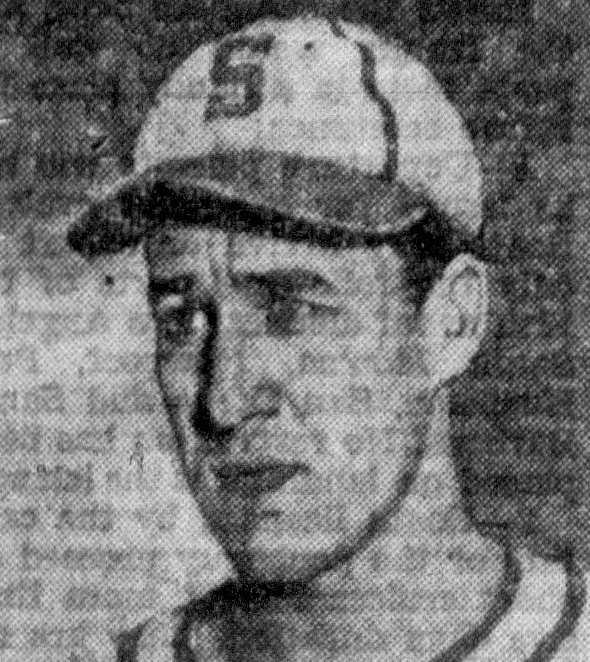
- Blattner, circa 1941
- Second baseman
- Born: February 8, 1920; St. Louis, Missouri, U.S.
- Died: September 4, 2009 (aged 89); Chesterfield, Missouri, U.S.
- Batted: Switch Threw: Right

MLB debut
- April 18, 1942, for the St. Louis Cardinals

Last MLB appearance
- October 2, 1949, for the Philadelphia Phillies

MLB statistics
- Hits: 176
- Batting average: .247
- Games played: 272
- Stats at Baseball Reference

Teams
- St. Louis Cardinals (1942); New York Giants (1946–1948); Philadelphia Phillies (1949)

Buddy Blattner
Personal information
- Full name: Robert Garnett Blattner
- Nationality: United States

Sport
- Sport: Table tennis
Medal record
Men's table tennis
Representing United States
World Championships
Gold medal – first place	1937 Baden	Doubles
Gold medal – first place	1937 Baden	Men's Team
Gold medal – first place	1936 Prague	Doubles

Robert Garnett "Buddy" Blattner (February 8, 1920 – September 4, 2009) was an American table tennis and professional baseball player. He played five seasons in Major League Baseball (MLB), primarily for the New York Giants. After his retirement as a player, he became a radio and television sportscaster.

== Sports career ==
=== Table tennis ===
Blattner played table tennis in his youth, winning the gold medal in the men's doubles with James McClure at the 1936 World Table Tennis Championships. The following year he won double gold at the 1937 World Table Tennis Championships in the men's team event and in the men's doubles with McClure.

=== Baseball ===
A graduate of Beaumont High School in St. Louis, Blattner started his Major League Baseball (MLB) career with the St. Louis Cardinals, making his big league debut in the 1942 season. Following a stint in the United States Navy, Blattner played for the New York Giants (1946–48) and Philadelphia Phillies (1949); he played primarily as a second baseman.

=== Broadcasting ===
Blattner turned to broadcasting after his retirement as a player, teaming with Dizzy Dean on St. Louis Browns radio as well as nationally on the Liberty and Mutual networks, and on the televised baseball Game of the Week on ABC (1953–54) and CBS (1955–59). He also called games for the St. Louis Hawks of the National Basketball Association in the '50s.

Blattner was replaced on CBS by Pee Wee Reese following a dispute with Dean. Blattner continued to broadcast baseball for the Cardinals (1960–61), Los Angeles/California Angels (1962–68), and Kansas City Royals (1969–75) as well as on NBC's coverage of the 1964 and 1967 All-Star Games.

== Personal life ==
In 1962, Blattner founded the "Buddy Fund", a charitable organization that supplies athletic equipment to disabled and underprivileged children in the St. Louis area. He was inducted into the U.S. Table Tennis Association Hall of Fame in 1979, and the Missouri Sports Hall of Fame in 1980. On September 4, 2009, Blattner died at his home in Chesterfield, Missouri, from lung cancer, aged 89. In 2021 Baseball Hall of Fame balloting, Blattner was a finalist for the Ford C. Frick Award, presented annually by the National Baseball Hall of Fame.

== See also ==
- List of World Table Tennis Championships medalists
