= Richard Bergmann =

Austrian table tennis player (1919–1970)

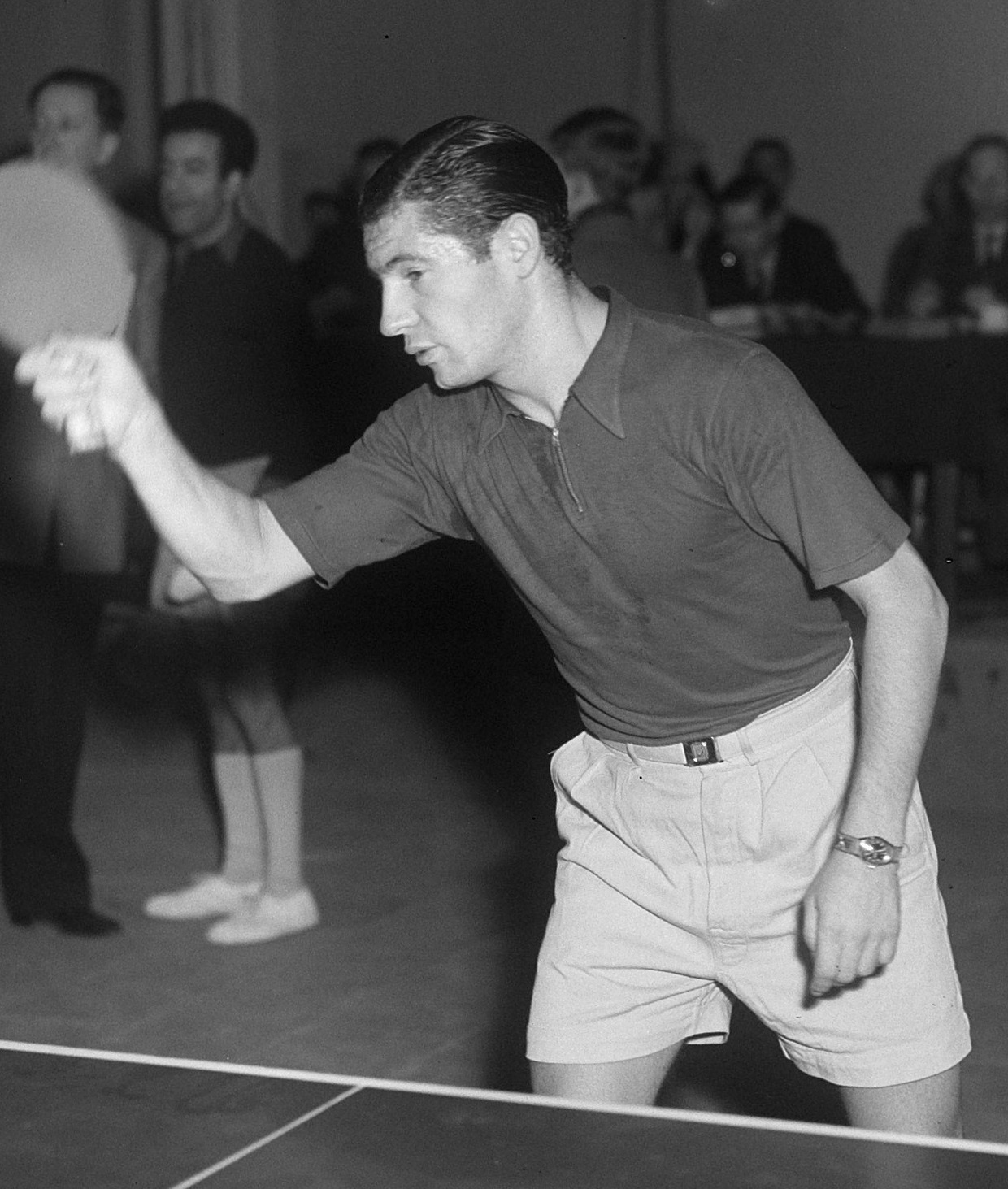
- Richard Bergmann in 1950

Personal information
- Nationality: England Austria
- Born: 10 April 1919 Vienna, Austria
- Died: 5 April 1970 (aged 50) London Borough of Wandsworth, UK

Sport
- Sport: Table tennis
Medal record
Table tennis
Representing Austria
World Championships
Silver medal – second place	1938 Wembley	Singles
Silver medal – second place	1938 Wembley	Team
Gold medal – first place	1937 Baden	Singles
Silver medal – second place	1937 Baden	Doubles
Bronze medal – third place	1936 Prague	Singles
Gold medal – first place	1936 Prague	Team
Representing England
World Championships
Bronze medal – third place	1955 Utrecht	Team
Bronze medal – third place	1954 Wembley	Singles
Bronze medal – third place	1954 Wembley	Team
Silver medal – second place	1953 Bucharest	Doubles
Gold medal – first place	1953 Bucharest	Team
Silver medal – second place	1952 Bombay	Doubles
Silver medal – second place	1952 Bombay	Team
Gold medal – first place	1950 Budapest	Singles
Bronze medal – third place	1950 Budapest	Team
Bronze medal – third place	1949 Stockholm	Doubles
Bronze medal – third place	1949 Stockholm	Team
Gold medal – first place	1948 Wembley	Singles
Bronze medal – third place	1948 Wembley	Doubles
Bronze medal – third place	1948 Wembley	Mixed Doubles
Gold medal – first place	1939 Cairo	Singles
Gold medal – first place	1939 Cairo	Doubles

Richard Bergmann (10 April 1919 – 5 April 1970) was an Austrian-British international table tennis player. Winner of seven World Championships, including four Singles, one Men's Doubles, two Team's titles and 22 medals in total. He is considered to be one of the greatest players in history, only Viktor Barna has won more World Championship gold medals in singles.

== Table tennis career ==
His 22 World Championship medals include seven gold medals; two in the men's team, one in the men's doubles at the 1936 World Table Tennis Championships with Viktor Barna and four times in the singles at the 1937, 1939, 1948 and 1950.

== Legacy ==
Bergmann was inducted into the International Jewish Sports Hall of Fame in 1982, and into the International Table Tennis Foundation Hall of Fame in 1993 as one of twelve founding members. Since 1967, the Richard Bergmann Fair Play Trophy is contested at the Liebherr World Championships.

== See also ==
- List of select Jewish table tennis players
- List of table tennis players
- List of World Table Tennis Championships medalists
- List of England players at the World Team Table Tennis Championships
