= Jessie Purves =

American table tennis player

Jessie 'Jay' Purves
Personal information
- Full name: Jessie Lydia Purves
- Nationality: United States
- Died: January 1979

Sport
- Sport: Table tennis
Medal record
Women's table tennis
Representing United States
World Championships
Gold medal – first place	1937 Baden	Team
Bronze medal – third place	1936 Prague	Doubles
Silver medal – second place	1936 Prague	Team

Jessie 'Jay' Purves was an international table tennis player from the United States.

== Table tennis career ==
She won two World Championship medals including a gold medal in the Women's Team event at the 1937 World Table Tennis Championships.

== Hall of Fame ==
She was inducted into the USA Hall of Fame in 1979 months after her death.

== See also ==
- List of table tennis players
- List of World Table Tennis Championships medalists
