= Lillian Hutchings =

British table tennis player

Personal information
- Nationality: England
Medal record
Representing England
World Table Tennis Championships
Bronze medal – third place	1937	Women's Doubles

Lillian Hutchings was a female English international table tennis player.

She won a bronze medal at the 1937 World Table Tennis Championships in the women's doubles with Stefanie Werle.

== See also ==
- List of England players at the World Team Table Tennis Championships
- List of World Table Tennis Championships medalists
