= Raoul Bedoc =

French table tennis player

Personal information
- Nationality: France
Medal record
Representing France
World Table Tennis Championships
Bronze medal – third place	1935	Men's doubles
Bronze medal – third place	1936	Men's team
Bronze medal – third place	1939	Men's doubles

Raoul Bedoc was a male French international table tennis player.

He won a bronze medal at the 1935 World Table Tennis Championships in the men's doubles with Daniel Guérin and the following year won another bronze at the 1936 World Table Tennis Championships in the men's team event.

In 1939 he won a third bronze at the 1939 World Table Tennis Championships in the men's doubles with Michel Haguenauer.

He was captain of the French Swaythling Cup team; the Men's team event. He was the 1934 French National champion in mixed doubles.

== See also ==
- List of table tennis players
- List of World Table Tennis Championships medalists
