= Alojzy Ehrlich =

Polish table tennis player (1914–1992)

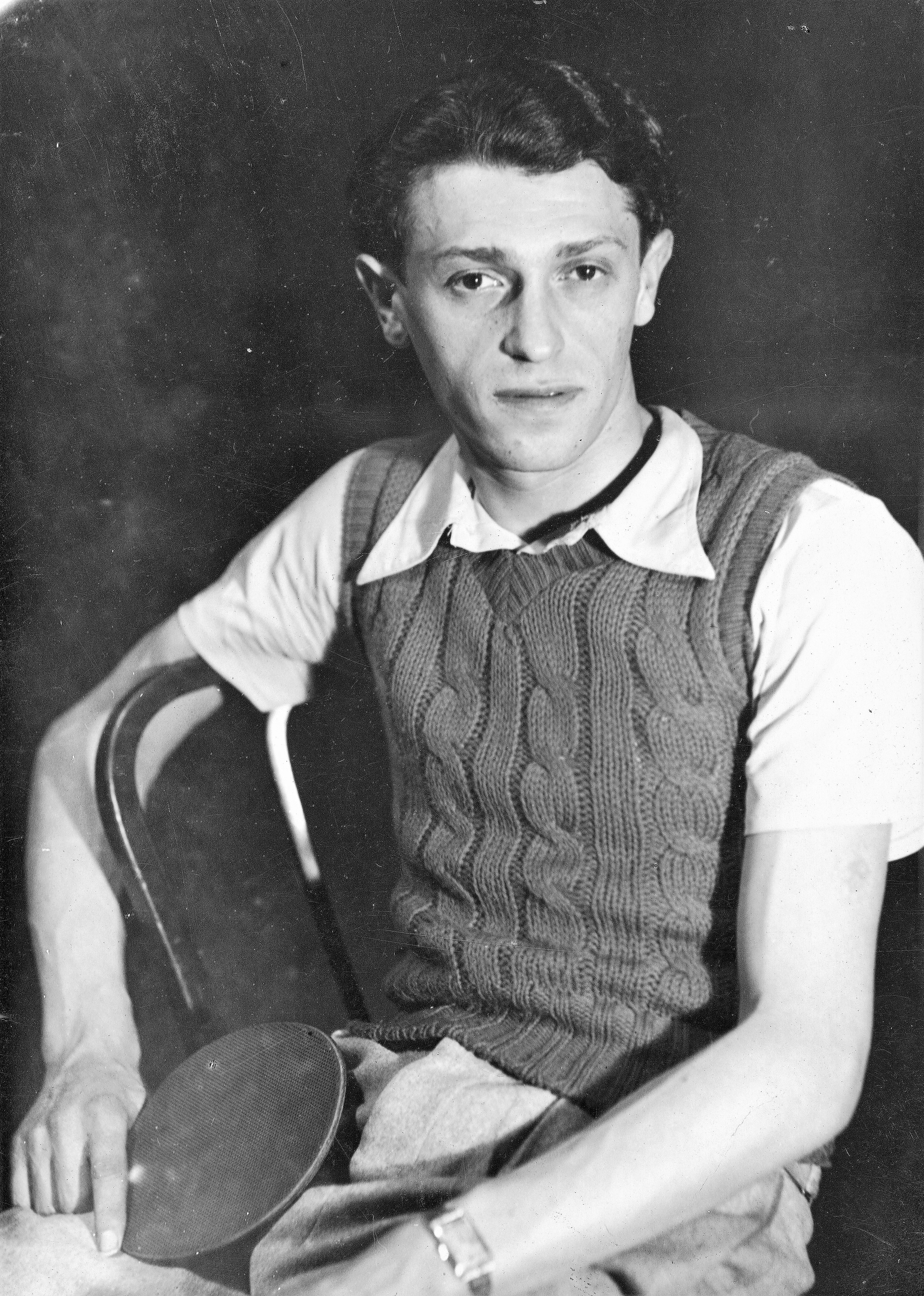
- Ehrlich in 1936

Personal information
- Full name: Aloizy Ehrlich
- Nationality: Poland
- Born: 1 January 1914
- Died: 7 December 1992 (aged 78)

Sport
- Sport: Table tennis
Medal record
Men's table tennis
Representing Poland
World Championships
Silver medal – second place	1939 Cairo	Singles
Silver medal – second place	1937 Baden	Singles
Silver medal – second place	1936 Prague	Singles
Bronze medal – third place	1936 Prague	Team
Bronze medal – third place	1935 Wembley	Singles
Bronze medal – third place	1935 Wembley	Team

Alojzy "Alex" Ehrlich (1 January 1914 – 7 December 1992) was a Polish table tennis player, widely regarded as one of the best players in Polish history of the sport, who three times won silver at the World Championships. Ehrlich was ranked sixth in the world in 1938 by Hon. Ivor Montagu and ninth in 1950. He was nicknamed the "King of the Chiselers," chiseler being a table tennis term for a defender who never attacks.

He was a very popular athlete in interbellum Poland; in 1934 Ehrlich was ranked 8th in a list of 10 most popular sportsmen of Poland, voted on by readers of the national sports daily Przeglad Sportowy.

== Early years ==
Ehrlich was born in 1914 in the village of Bukowsko in southern Poland (then part of the Kingdom of Galicia and Lodomeria, a component kingdom of Austria-Hungary). Some time later (exact year is unknown), he settled in Lwow and started playing table tennis, most probably in the mid-1920s, in the local Jewish sports club Hasmonea Lwow.

Together with Hasmonea, he won first team championships of Poland (Lwow, 1933), and became his country's top player. In 1934 Erlich and another player from Lwow, Władysław Loewenhertz represented Poland in an international match staged in Danzig where they defeated Germany 7–2. The same team, Erlich and Loewenherz with the addition of Simon Pohoryles, represented Poland in 1935 at the Swaithling Cup competition in London where they achieved second ranking in A Group. Eventually, the Polish team including Erlich reached the semifinals of the World Championships, and in 1935 he won bronze in the singles' match of the same competition. Three times—1936, 1937, and 1939—Ehrlich was vice-champion of the world, and he is among only four players who played in three finals without winning (together with Hungarian Laszlo Bellak Chinese Li Furong and Chinese Ma Lin) In 1936 in Prague, he lost to Stanislav Kolar from Czechoslovakia. In 1937 in Baden, he lost to Austrian player Richard Bergmann, and two years later in Cairo, he lost to Bergmann again.

In the early 1930s, Ehrlich, who spoke eight languages, moved to France, but remained loyal to Poland and represented his native land in subsequent tournaments.

== Record-breaking exchange ==
During the 1936 World Table Tennis Championships, which took place in Prague, Ehrlich became famous after a record-breaking one-point exchange with Romanian player Paneth Farkas. The exchange lasted two hours and 12 minutes; after 70 minutes the score was 0-0. It is still the longest competitive point in a match in table tennis history to date, despite there being later non-competitive rally. Both players suffered, but neither wanted to give up. Altogether, the ball crossed the net more than 12,000 times. After two hours, Farkas' arm began to freeze, and he lost the first point. The referee, Gábor Diner, had to be replaced during the match, because his neck was so sore.

== During the Holocaust ==
During the Holocaust, Ehrlich was captured by the Germans and was sent to Auschwitz. He spent four years there and later at Dachau, and was saved from the gas chamber because the Nazis recognised him as a world champion. The Nazis assigned him the task of disposing of bombs.

Marty Reisman claimed to have heard a story that while Ehrlich was in Auschwitz, he came across beehives and secretly smeared the honey across his chest so other prisoners would be able to lick it off his chest and not starve to death.

== Post-Holocaust career ==
After the war, he settled in Paris, where for some time he lived in a tenement building, on the seventh floor. Ehrlich continued playing tennis, with several achievements. However, he did not represent Poland any more, because living in the West led to his being named persona non grata by the Communist government. Between 1952 and 1963, he was a member of the French national team, reaching the quarterfinals of the 1957 World Championships. Also, in the late 1940s and early 1950s, Ehrlich many times was international champion of such countries as Ireland, France, Germany and the Netherlands.

In the Irish Open he beat Johnny Leach in straight sets, shortly after Leach had won his first World Singles Title. For the previous 6 weeks, Erlich had been coaching Irish players, from beginners to the National Team, and must have been sorely out of top class practice. After coaching sessions, for practice, he would play his unofficial assistant Zerrick Woolfson of Dublin, giving him 12 points start. He told Woolfson that he gave the National Team members 10 points.

His victory over Leach was highly gratifying to him, since he had not been able to get sponsorship from any country, and was therefore not allowed to partake in the World Championships. He was about 35 years old at this time, and considered long past his best. During this period he was also developing a sports business partnership with French Champion Amouretti.

After finishing his career, Ehrlich became a coach, also developing a table tennis robot, which was presented by him in 1964 in Malmö, Sweden. Furthermore, Ehrlich was the one who introduced military fitness drills, based on backward hops down long staircases. In the French Riviera, he opened a holiday center with table tennis training facilities.

He died in a hospital in the Paris suburb of Saint Denis on 7 December 1992.

The character of Bela Kletzki in the 2025 American film Marty Supreme, played by Géza Röhrig, is based on Ehrlich.

== See also ==
- List of select Jewish table tennis players
- List of World Table Tennis Championships medalists
