= Gertrude Kleinová =

Austria-Hungarian table tennis player (1918–1976)

Traute Kleinová

Personal information
- Full name: Gertrude Kleinová
- Nicknames: Traute and Trude
- Born: 13 August 1918 Brno, Austria-Hungary
- Died: 9 April 1976 (aged 57)

Sport
- Sport: Table tennis
- Club: Maccabi Club of Brno
Medal record
Women's table tennis
Representing Czechoslovakia
World Championships
Gold medal – first place	1935 Wembley	Team
Gold medal – first place	1936 Prague	Mixed Doubles
Gold medal – first place	1936 Prague	Team

Gertrude "Traute or Trude" Kleinová (born in Brno, Moravia, Austria-Hungary (now Czech Republic); August 13, 1918 – April 9, 1976) was a three-time world champion table tennis player, winning the women's team world championship twice, and the world mixed doubles once.

She and her first husband were deported by the Nazis to the Theresienstadt concentration camp and eventually sent to the Auschwitz concentration camp, where her husband was killed. She was posthumously inducted into the International Jewish Sports Hall of Fame.

== Early life ==
Kleinová was Jewish, and was a member of the Maccabi Club of Brno.

== Table tennis career ==
Kleinová was a member of the Czech national table tennis team that won the 1935 and 1936 Women's World Table Tennis Championships (the Corbillon Cup). At the 1935 championships in Wembley, England, she advanced to the quarterfinals in singles, doubles, and mixed doubles.

In March 1936, she also teamed with Miloslav Hamr to win the gold medal in the Mixed Doubles 10th World Table Tennis Championships in Prague. In the competition they defeated Americans Buddy Blattner and Jay Purves in the preliminaries, as they won 21–19 in the fifth game.

In the Women's Doubles in 1936, Kleinová and Jindra Holoubkova-Juarez lost to Americans World Champion Ruth Aarons and Jay Purves in the quarter-finals, losing 21–19 in the fourth game. In singles, she advanced as far as the round of 32.

In 1937, in the Mixed Doubles at the World Table Tennis Championships in Baden, Austria, Americans Abe Berenbaum and Emily Fuller upset the defending champions Kleinová and Hamr in the round of 32, by a score of −11, −15, 5, 19, 15. She also lost in the round of 16 in both singles and Women's Doubles.

Kleinová married Jacob Schalinger, the Chairman of her table tennis division, in 1939.

== Concentration camps, and later life ==
Kleinová and her husband, as well as her coach Eric Vogel, were deported from Prague where they lived by the Nazis to the Theresienstadt concentration camp in December 1941. Each was eventually sent to the Auschwitz concentration camp. She and Vogel survived, but her husband was killed.

She later married Vogel. After World War II concluded, in 1948 Kleinová and Vogel emigrated to the United States. She died of cancer in 1976.

== Hall of Fame ==
In 1994, Kleinová was inducted into the International Jewish Sports Hall of Fame.

== See also ==
- List of victims and survivors of Auschwitz
- World Table Tennis Championships
- List of select Jewish table tennis players
