= Michel Haguenauer =

French table tennis player (1916–2000)

Personal information
- Nationality: France
- Born: 22 January 1916
- Died: 25 August 2000 (aged 84)
Medal record
Representing France
World Table Tennis Championships
Bronze medal – third place	1936	Men's team
Bronze medal – third place	1939	Men's doubles
Bronze medal – third place	1947	Men's team
Silver medal – second place	1948	Men's team
Bronze medal – third place	1950	Men's team
Bronze medal – third place	1953	Men's team
Silver medal – second place	1954	Men's doubles

Michel Haguenauer (1916–2000), was a male French international table tennis player.

He won a five medals in the team event at the World Table Tennis Championships. In addition he won a bronze medal at the 1939 World Table Tennis Championships in the men's doubles with Raoul Bedoc and in 1954 he won a silver medal at the 1936 World Table Tennis Championships in the men's doubles with the legendary Viktor Barna.

He won 22 French national titles including eight singles events between 1933 and 1950. He famously played in a match against Marin Vasile-Goldberger that lasted 7 hours 35 minutes before the match was stopped.

He was elected "glory of French sport", and his name is engraved at the Stade Pierre de Coubertin (Paris).

== See also ==
- List of table tennis players
- List of World Table Tennis Championships medalists
