= Dora Emdin =

English table tennis player

Personal information
- Nationality: English
- Born: 4 August 1912
- Died: 9 April 1945 (aged 32)
Medal record
Representing England
World Table Tennis Championships
Bronze medal – third place	1934	Women's Singles
Bronze medal – third place	1938	Women's Doubles
Silver medal – second place	1938	Women's Team

Dora M Emdin (4 August 1912 – 9 April 1945) was a female English international table tennis player.

== Table tennis career ==
She won a bronze medal at the 1934 World Table Tennis Championships in the women's singles.

She won another bronze at the 1938 World Table Tennis Championships in the women's doubles with Margaret Osborne and a silver medal in the women's team. She also won five English Open titles.

== Personal life ==
Her older sister Doris Lucy Emdin was also a notable table tennis international.

She married Jack Zillwood in 1940 and died, aged 32, after a short illness in 1945.

== See also ==
- List of England players at the World Team Table Tennis Championships
- List of World Table Tennis Championships medalists
