= Ruth Aarons =

American table tennis player (1918–1980)

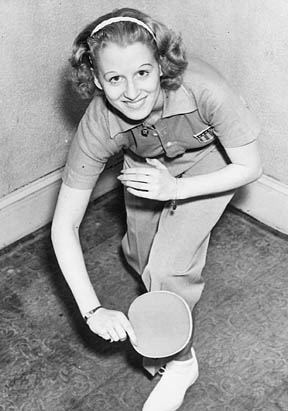
- Aarons as USA's 1936 World Women's Singles Champion.

Personal information
- Full name: Ruth Hughes Aarons
- Nationality: United States
- Born: 11 June 1918 Stamford, Connecticut
- Died: 6 June 1980 (aged 61) Los Angeles, California

Sport
- Sport: Table tennis
- Playing style: Shakehand grip
Medal record
Women's table tennis
Representing United States
World Championships
Gold medal – first place	1937 Baden	Singles
Gold medal – first place	1937 Baden	Women's Team
Gold medal – first place	1936 Prague	Singles
Silver medal – second place	1936 Prague	Women's Team
Bronze medal – third place	1936 Prague	Doubles

Ruth Hughes Aarons (June 11, 1918 – June 6, 1980) was a US table tennis player, vaudeville entertainer, and talent manager.

== Early life ==
Ruth Aarons was born in Stamford, Connecticut, to Leila (née Hughes), an opera singer, and Alfred E. Aarons, a Broadway theatrical producer. She came from a wealthy Jewish family, and lived in New York City, where she attended and graduated from St. Agatha Episcopal High School in 1936.

== Table tennis career ==
Originally a tennis player, Aarons was reportedly introduced to table tennis by mere chance, in the summer of 1933. During a rainstorm, which ended a tennis match early, she discovered and quickly became fascinated by table tennis. Over time, Aarons developed and mastered her own defensive technique centered on the "shakehand" grip, for which she became notable.

Aarons would spend the next five years traveling the United States and Europe, competing in various table tennis matches and championships, and enjoying much success, eventually building a reputation as a strong defensive player. Her main achievements were winning two gold medals in the singles competition at the World Table Tennis Championships in 1936 and 1937, being the only American competitor to do so at the time. She also won doubles and team medals for the United States in the World Table Tennis Championships. Upon winning the gold medal in Prague in 1936, Aarons refused to shake the hand of Astrid Krebsbach, her opponent from Nazi Germany, proclaiming: "I am Jewish".

The champion of Woman's Singles in 1937 was declared vacant due to time limit rule in force at the time. In 2001, it was decided to declare the two players (i.e., Ruth Aarons and Gertrude Pritzi) Co-Champions.

While still involved in professional table tennis, Aarons, thanks to her father's theatrical connections, performed in vaudeville for several years, in both America and England, in a routine centered on the game. These performances enjoyed much success in the United States, as the United States Table Tennis Association (USATT) had granted her permission as an active member, to play the game for compensation. In England, however, Aarons faced sanctions by the English Table Tennis Association (ETTA), who had jurisdiction over her USATT-made performance contracts for shows in England, and eventual suspension by the International Table Tennis Federation (ITTF) in January 1937. Officials claimed that Aarons violated the newly enacted (December 1936) policy prohibiting active members from accepting compensation for public table tennis playing. Aarons would later come back for the 1937 Women's World Singles Championships, and then retire altogether.

She also won two English Open titles.

In 1966, Aarons was inducted in the US Hall of Fame for her contributions to and success in the sport of table tennis

== Later years ==
After her retirement from table tennis in 1938, Aarons found much success as a show business manager, forming her own management firm (Aarons Management), and guiding to success the careers of clientele including Jack Cassidy, Shirley Jones, David Cassidy, Shaun Cassidy, Susan Dey, George Chakiris, Janis Paige, Claibe Richardson, and Celeste Holm.

Later in life, Aarons developed an addiction to prescription medication, particularly Seconal. According to close friend David Cassidy, he would discover thousands of pills in her home while visiting. The medication eventually took its toll physically and psychologically, exacerbated greatly by the tragic death of longtime friend and actor Jack Cassidy in December 1976. By 1979, all her clients had lost faith in her capability as a manager and moved on.

On June 6, 1980, just five days before her 62nd birthday, Aarons was found dead in the shower of her Beverly Hills home, presumably from falling and hitting her head. According to Cassidy, her drug use was so profound that her muscles often atrophied, which rendered her unable to leave her bed, much less to stand.

== See also ==
- List of table tennis players
- List of select Jewish table tennis players
- List of World Table Tennis Championships medalists
