= Miloslav Hamr =

Czech table tennis player (1913–2002)

Miloslav Hamer
Personal information
- Nickname: Milo
- Nationality: Czechoslovakia
- Born: 22 June 1913
- Died: 4 February 2002 (aged 88)
Medal record
Men's table tennis
Representing Czechoslovakia
World Championships
Silver medal – second place	1933	Team
Bronze medal – third place	1934	Doubles
Silver medal – second place	1933	Team
Silver medal – second place	1935	Team
Gold medal – first place	1936	Mixed Doubles
Bronze medal – third place	1936	Team
Bronze medal – third place	1937	Mixed Doubles
Bronze medal – third place	1937	Team
Bronze medal – third place	1938	Team
Gold medal – first place	1939	Team
Silver medal – second place	1939	Doubles

Miloslav Hamer (spelled Hamr in some sources) (22 June 1913 - 4 February 2002) was a Czechoslovak international table tennis player who was a world champion in mixed doubles and team table tennis.

== Table tennis career ==
He won eleven medals in the World Table Tennis Championships from 1933 to 1939. In March 1936, he teamed with Gertrude Kleinová to win the gold medal in the Mixed Doubles 10th World Table Tennis Championships in Prague, in a competition that saw them defeat Americans Buddy Blattner and Jay Purves in the preliminaries as they won 21–19 in the fifth game. He also won the team championship in 1939 in Cairo.

== See also ==
- World Table Tennis Championships
- List of table tennis players
- List of World Table Tennis Championships medalists
