= Anita Felguth =

German table tennis player

Personal information
- Full name: Felguth Anita
- Nationality: Germany
- Born: 13 May 1909
- Died: 21 June 2003 (aged 94)

Sport
- Sport: Table tennis
Medal record
Women's table tennis
Representing Germany
World Championships
| Silver medal – second place | 1936 Prague | Team |
| Bronze medal – third place | 1935 Wembley | Doubles |
| Bronze medal – third place | 1935 Wembley | Team |
| Silver medal – second place | 1934 Paris | Doubles |
| Gold medal – first place | 1934 Paris | Team |
| Bronze medal – third place | 1933 Baden | Doubles |
| Bronze medal – third place | 1932 Prague | Doubles |

Anita Felguth, also known as Anita Felguth-Denker, (13 May 1909 in Hamburg-Altona – 21 June 2003 in Berlin) was a German table tennis player.

== Table tennis career ==
From 1932 to 1936 she won six medals in singles, doubles and team events in the World Table Tennis Championships.

The six World Championship medals included one gold medal in the 1934 World Table Tennis Championships team event for Germany.

== See also ==
- List of table tennis players
- List of World Table Tennis Championships medalists
