= Wendy Woodhead =

British table tennis player

Personal information
- Full name: Pauline Wendy Woodhead (Burbush)
- Nationality: England
- Born: 10 May 1916 Oxfordshire, England
- Died: January 2003 (aged 86) Cumberland, England
Medal record
Women's table tennis
Representing England
World Championships
Silver medal – second place	1937 Baden	Doubles
Gold medal – first place	1938 London	Mixed

Pauline 'Wendy' Woodhead (10 May 1916 – January 2003) was a female former international table tennis player from England.

== Table tennis career ==
She won a silver medal with Margaret Osborne in the women's doubles at the 1937 World Table Tennis Championships. The following year she won a gold medal at the 1938 World Table Tennis Championships with Laszlo Bellak. It was the first time they had paired together for a tournament.

She also won four English Open titles.

== Personal life ==
Her father Percy William Woodhead owned a tennis court and table tennis room where she learnt to play. She married Martin 'Bunny' Burbush in 1940. She died in 2003, in Penrith, Cumbria.

Wendy & Martin had two children. Belinda & Timothy.

== See also ==
- List of England players at the World Team Table Tennis Championships
- List of World Table Tennis Championships medalists
