= Marie Kettnerová =

Czech table tennis player

Personal information
- Nationality: Czech Republic
- Born: 4 April 1911 Prague
- Died: 28 February 1998 (aged 86) Prague
Medal record
Representing Czechoslovakia
World Table Tennis Championships
Gold medal – first place	1934	Singles
Gold medal – first place	1935	Team
Gold medal – first place	1935	Singles
Gold medal – first place	1936	Doubles
Gold medal – first place	1936	Team
Gold medal – first place	1938	Team
Silver medal – second place	1935	Doubles
Silver medal – second place	1935	Mixed Doubles
Silver medal – second place	1937	Mixed Doubles
Silver medal – second place	1939	Team
Silver medal – second place	1939	Mixed Doubles
Bronze medal – third place	1934	Team
Bronze medal – third place	1934	Doubles
Bronze medal – third place	1936	Singles
Bronze medal – third place	1937	Doubles
Bronze medal – third place	1937	Singles
Bronze medal – third place	1937	Team
Bronze medal – third place	1938	Mixed Doubles
Bronze medal – third place	1939	Doubles
Bronze medal – third place	1939	Singles
Bronze medal – third place	1947	Team
Bronze medal – third place	1948	Team
Bronze medal – third place	1950	Team

Marie Kettnerová (born in Prague on 4 April 1911; died in Prague on 28 February 1998) was a female Czech international table tennis player.

== Table tennis career ==
She won an incredible 23 World Table Tennis Championships medals from 1933 to 1950. She was a singles gold medal winner of the World Table Tennis Championships in both women's single and doubles. In singles she won in 1934 and 1935, in doubles in 1936 and three times team gold winner. She was a charter member of the ITTF Hall of Fame.

She also won an English Open title.

== See also ==
- List of table tennis players
- List of World Table Tennis Championships medalists
