= Astrid Krebsbach =

German table tennis player

Personal information
- Full name: Astrid Krebsbach
- Nationality: Germany
- Born: 9 February 1913
- Died: 17 September 1995 (aged 82)
Medal record
Women's table tennis
Representing Germany
World Championships
Silver medal – second place	1937 Baden	Team
Silver medal – second place	1936 Prague	Singles
Silver medal – second place	1936 Prague	Team
Bronze medal – third place	1935 Wembley	Doubles
Bronze medal – third place	1935 Wembley	Team
Silver medal – second place	1934 Paris	Singles
Silver medal – second place	1934 Paris	Doubles
Gold medal – first place	1934 Paris	Team
Bronze medal – third place	1933 Baden	Singles

Astrid Krebsbach (married name Horn), (9 February 1913 in Vienna - 17 September 1995 in Quedlinburg) was a German international table tennis player.

== Table tennis career ==
From 1933 to 1937 she won nine medals in singles, doubles and team events in the World Table Tennis Championships.

The nine World Championship medals included one gold medal in the team event at the 1934 World Table Tennis Championships for Germany.

She also won an English Open title.

== See also ==
- List of table tennis players
- List of World Table Tennis Championships medalists
