= Margaret Osborne (table tennis) =

British table tennis player

Margaret Osborne Knott
Personal information
- Nationality: England
- Born: 7 July 1913 Upton-upon-Severn, Worcestershire, England
- Died: April 1987 (aged 73) Birmingham, West Midlands, England
Medal record
Representing England
World Table Tennis Championships
Bronze medal – third place	1935	Mixed doubles
Silver medal – second place	1937	Women's doubles
Silver medal – second place	1938	Women's team
Bronze medal – third place	1938	Women's doubles
Gold medal – first place	1947	Women's team

Lucy Margaret Knott (née Osborne, 7 July 1913 – c. April 1987) was an English international table tennis and tennis player.

== Table tennis career ==
Osborne won five World Table Tennis Championship medals; In the 1935 World Table Tennis Championships she won a mixed doubles bronze medal with Adrian Haydon and two years later she won another bronze with Wendy Woodhead in the women's doubles at the 1937 World Table Tennis Championships.

Two more medals were won during the 1938 World Table Tennis Championships in the singles and in the doubles with Dora Emdin. A gold medal was finally won when she was a member of the winning team in the 1947 World Table Tennis Championships. She also won eight English Open titles.

== Tennis career ==
She played at The Championships, Wimbledon, listed as Mrs B. W. Knott, from 1949 to 1952.

== Personal life and death ==
Osborne was born in Upton-upon-Severn, Worcestershire on 7 July 1913. She married Basil W. Knott on 25 January 1947, in Edgbaston, Birmingham. She played under the name Margaret Knott thereafter. She died in Birmingham in 1987, at the age of 73.

== See also ==
- List of table tennis players
- List of World Table Tennis Championships medalists
- List of England players at the World Team Table Tennis Championships
