= Stanislav Kolář =

Czech table tennis player (1912–2003)

Personal information
- Full name: KOLÁŘ Stanislav
- Nationality: Czechoslovakia
- Born: 31 March 1912
- Died: 6 May 2003 (aged 91)

Sport
- Sport: Table tennis
Medal record
Men's table tennis
Representing Czechoslovakia
World Championships
Bronze medal – third place	1938 Wembley	Doubles
Bronze medal – third place	1938 Wembley	Team
Silver medal – second place	1937 Baden	Mixed Doubles
Bronze medal – third place	1937 Baden	Team
Gold medal – first place	1936 Prague	Singles
Silver medal – second place	1936 Prague	Doubles
Bronze medal – third place	1936 Prague	Mixed Doubles
Bronze medal – third place	1936 Prague	Team
Silver medal – second place	1935 Wembley	Mixed Doubles
Silver medal – second place	1935 Wembley	Team
Bronze medal – third place	1934 Paris	Mixed Doubles
Silver medal – second place	1934 Paris	Team
Silver medal – second place	1933 Baden	Singles
Silver medal – second place	1933 Baden	Team
Gold medal – first place	1932 Prague	Team
Silver medal – second place	1931 Budapest	Team

Stanislav Kolář (31 March 1912 – 6 May 2003) was a male former international table tennis player from Czechoslovakia.

== Table tennis career ==
From 1931 to 1938 he won sixteen medals in singles, doubles, and team events in the World Table Tennis Championships

The sixteen medals included two gold medals in the men's singles at the 1936 World Table Tennis Championships and men's team event at the 1932 World Table Tennis Championships.

== See also ==
- List of table tennis players
- List of World Table Tennis Championships medalists
