= 1953 World Table Tennis Championships =

1953 edition of the World Table Tennis Championships

The 1953 World Table Tennis Championships were held at the Floreasca and Dynamo Halls in Bucharest from March 20 to March 29, 1953.

== Medalists ==
=== Team ===
Event	Gold	Silver	Bronze
Swaythling Cup; Men's Team	England; Richard Bergmann; Adrian Haydon; Brian Kennedy; Johnny Leach; Aubrey Simons	Hungary; Elemér Gyetvai; József Kóczián; Miklós Sebők; Ferenc Sidó; Kálmán Szepesi	France; Guy Amouretti; Michel Haguenauer; Michel Lanskoy; René Roothooft; Jean-Claude Sala
Swaythling Cup; Men's Team	England; Richard Bergmann; Adrian Haydon; Brian Kennedy; Johnny Leach; Aubrey Simons	Hungary; Elemér Gyetvai; József Kóczián; Miklós Sebők; Ferenc Sidó; Kálmán Szepesi	Czechoslovakia; Ivan Andreadis; Václav Tereba; František Tokár; Bohumil Váňa; Ludvík Vyhnanovský
Corbillon Cup; Women's Team	Romania; Angelica Rozeanu; Sari Szasz; Ella Zeller	England; Kathleen Best; Diane Rowe; Rosalind Rowe	Austria; Friederike Lauber; Gertrude Pritzi; Ermelinde Wertl
Corbillon Cup; Women's Team	Romania; Angelica Rozeanu; Sari Szasz; Ella Zeller	England; Kathleen Best; Diane Rowe; Rosalind Rowe	Hungary; Agnes Almási-Simon; Zsuzsa Fantusz; Gizi Gervai-Farkas; Éva Kóczián

=== Individual ===
Event	Gold	Silver	Bronze
Men's singles	(Hungary) Ferenc Sidó	(Czechoslovakia) Ivan Andreadis	(Czechoslovakia) Ladislav Štípek
Men's singles	(Hungary) Ferenc Sidó	(Czechoslovakia) Ivan Andreadis	(Hungary) József Kóczián
Women's singles	(Romania) Angelica Rozeanu	(Hungary) Gizi Gervai-Farkas	(England) Diane Rowe
Women's singles	(Romania) Angelica Rozeanu	(Hungary) Gizi Gervai-Farkas	(England) Rosalind Rowe
Men's Doubles	(Hungary) József Kóczián (Hungary) Ferenc Sidó	(England) Richard Bergmann (England) Johnny Leach	(Czechoslovakia) Ivan Andreadis (Czechoslovakia) Bohumil Váňa
Men's Doubles	(Hungary) József Kóczián (Hungary) Ferenc Sidó	(England) Richard Bergmann (England) Johnny Leach	(England) Viktor Barna (England) Adrian Haydon
Women's Doubles	(Hungary) Gizi Gervai-Farkas (Romania) Angelica Rozeanu	(England) Diane Rowe (England) Rosalind Rowe	(Hungary) Zsuzsa Fantusz (Hungary) Edit Sági
Women's Doubles	(Hungary) Gizi Gervai-Farkas (Romania) Angelica Rozeanu	(England) Diane Rowe (England) Rosalind Rowe	(England) Kathleen Best (Austria) Ermelinde Wertl
Mixed Doubles	(Hungary) Ferenc Sidó (Romania) Angelica Rozeanu	(Socialist Federal Republic of Yugoslavia) Žarko Dolinar (Austria) Ermelinde Wertl	(Hungary) József Kóczián (Hungary) Gizi Gervai-Farkas
Mixed Doubles	(Hungary) Ferenc Sidó (Romania) Angelica Rozeanu	(Socialist Federal Republic of Yugoslavia) Žarko Dolinar (Austria) Ermelinde Wertl	(Hungary) László Földy (Hungary) Éva Kóczián
