= 1951 World Table Tennis Championships – Women's doubles =

1951 Women's doubles

The 1951 World Table Tennis Championships women's doubles was the 17th edition of the women's doubles championship. The twin sisters Diane Rowe and Rosalind Rowe defeated Sári Szász and Angelica Rozeanu in the final by three sets to two.

== Results ==
Round of 16
(Hungary) Gizi Farkas (Hungary) Rózsi Kárpáti	21	21	21
(United States) Patricia McLinn (England) Margaret Knott	17	10	12
(West Germany) Hilde Bussmann (West Germany) Berti Cappellmann	w/o
(Switzerland) Isabel Vez (Switzerland) Jeannette Grandjean
(England) Joyce Roberts (Scotland) Elisabeth Pithie	21	18	16	21	21
(Austria) Angela Staffelleitner (Austria) Gertrude Wurtzl	15	21	21	18	18
(Wales) Audrey Bates (Wales) Audrey Coombs	12	21	15	15
(England) Diane Rowe (England) Rosalind Rowe	21	17	21	21
(Scotland) Helen Elliot (England) Peggy Franks	17	16	21	21	17
(United States) Leah Thall (United States) Peggy Ichkoff	21	21	17	12	21
(Wales) Betty Gray (Wales) Betty Grewes	21	21	21
(Hungary) Ilona Solyom (Hungary) Edit Sági	18	15	13
(Austria) Gertrude Pritzi (Austria) Ermelinde Wertl	13	22	21	21
(Czechoslovakia) Eliška Fürstová-Krejkova (Hungary) Ilona Király	21	20	19	14
(West Germany) Astrid Horn (West Germany) Hertha Maier	11	21	15	10
(Romania) Angelica Rozeanu (Romania) Sári Szász	21	16	21	21

Quarterfinals
(Hungary) Farkas (Hungary) Kárpáti	21	21	21
(West Germany) Bussmann (West Germany) Cappellmann	9	19	18
(England) Roberts (Scotland) Pithie	19	17	12
(England) Rowe D (England) Rowe R	21	21	21
(United States) Thall (United States) Ichkoff	21	25	21
(Wales) Gray (Wales) Grewes	15	23	19
(Austria) Pritzi (Austria) Wertl	6	11	14
(Romania) Rozeanu (Romania) Szász	21	21	21

Semifinals
(Hungary) Farkas (Hungary) Kárpáti	14	21	15	21	12
(England) Rowe D (England) Rowe R	21	6	21	15	21
(United States) Thall (United States) Ichkoff	21	21	16	21
(Romania) Rozeanu (Romania) Szász	17	19	21	19

Final
(England) Rowe D (England) Rowe R	22	21	19	22	21
(Romania) Rozeanu (Romania) Szász	20	19	21	20	12

== See also ==
List of World Table Tennis Championships medalists
