= 1951 World Table Tennis Championships – Mixed doubles =

1951 Mixed doubles

The 1951 World Table Tennis Championships mixed doubles was the 18th edition of the mixed doubles championship.

Bohumil Váňa and Angelica Rozeanu defeated Vilim Harangozo and Ermelinde Wertl in the final by three sets to nil.

== Results ==
Round of 16
(Czechoslovakia) Bohumil Váňa (Romania) Angelica Rozeanu	21	21	21
(France) Michel Lanskoy (France) Simone Girard	18	13	9
(East Germany) Heinz Schneider (East Germany) Astrid Horn	21	21	21
(England) Michael Thornhill (England) Peggy Franks	18	7	15
(Czechoslovakia) Ladislav Štípek (Czechoslovakia) Eva Cedlová	21	21	19	21
(United States) Marty Reisman (United States) Peggy Ichkoff	19	19	21	18
(Hungary) József Kóczián (Hungary) Rozsi Karpati	21	21	21
(West Germany) Kurt Seifert (West Germany) Berti Cappellmann	18	14	19
(England) Brian Kennedy (England) Joyce Roberts	21	21	9	15	21
(England) Viktor Barna (Scotland) Helen Elliot	19	19	21	21	18
(Socialist Federal Republic of Yugoslavia) Vilim Harangozo (Austria) Ermelinde Wertl	21	21	21
(Hungary) Kálmán Szepesi (Hungary) Edit Sági	8	17	14
(Czechoslovakia) František Tokár (Czechoslovakia) Hana Hájková	15	21	14	10
(United States) John Somael (Austria) Gertrude Pritzi	21	14	21	21
(England) Johnny Leach (England) Diane Rowe	21	21	15	21	21
(Hungary) Ferenc Sidó (Hungary) Gizi Farkas	23	15	21	18	17

Quarterfinals
(Czechoslovakia) Váňa (Romania) Rozeanu	21	21	21
(East Germany) Schneider (East Germany) Horn	10	14	7
(Czechoslovakia) Štípek (Czechoslovakia) Cedlova	18	14	21	21	25
(Hungary) Kóczián (Hungary) Karpati	21	21	8	15	27
(England) Kennedy (England) Roberts	14	15	13
(Socialist Federal Republic of Yugoslavia) Harangozo (Austria) Wertl	21	21	21
(United States) Somael (Austria) Pritzi	21	10	11	20
(England) Leach (England) Rowe	15	21	21	22

Semifinals
(Czechoslovakia) Váňa (Romania) Rozeanu	24	26	21	17	21
(Hungary) Kóczián (Hungary) Karpati	22	28	13	21	15
(Socialist Federal Republic of Yugoslavia) Harangozo (Austria) Wertl	21	21	13	21
(England) Leach (England) Rowe	11	17	21	10

Final
(Czechoslovakia) Váňa (Romania) Rozeanu	21	21	21
(Socialist Federal Republic of Yugoslavia) Harangozo (Austria) Wertl	19	9	14

== See also ==
List of World Table Tennis Championships medalists
