= 1951 World Table Tennis Championships =

The 1951 World Table Tennis Championships were held in Vienna from March 2 to March 11, 1951.

== Medalists ==
=== Team ===
Event	Gold	Silver	Bronze
Swaythling Cup; Men's Team	Czechoslovakia; Ivan Andreadis; Ladislav Štípek; Václav Tereba; František Tokár; Bohumil Váňa	Hungary; Jozsef Farkas; József Kóczián; Ferenc Sidó; Kálmán Szepesi; Elemér Gyetvai	Yugoslavia; Žarko Dolinar; Josip Gabrić; Vilim Harangozo; Zdenko Uzorinac; Josip Vogrinc
Corbillon Cup; Women's team	Romania; Paraschiva Patulea; Angelica Rozeanu; Sári Szász; Ella Zeller	Austria; Gertrude Pritzi; Ermelinde Wertl; Gertrude Wutzl	England; Peggy Franks; Joyce Roberts; Diane Rowe; Rosalind Rowe
Corbillon Cup; Women's team	Romania; Paraschiva Patulea; Angelica Rozeanu; Sári Szász; Ella Zeller	Austria; Gertrude Pritzi; Ermelinde Wertl; Gertrude Wutzl	Wales; Audrey Bates; Audrey Coombs; Betty Gray

=== Individual ===
Event	Gold	Silver	Bronze
Men's singles	(England) Johnny Leach	(Czechoslovakia) Ivan Andreadis	(Czechoslovakia) Václav Tereba
Men's singles	(England) Johnny Leach	(Czechoslovakia) Ivan Andreadis	(Hungary) Ferenc Sidó
Women's singles	(Romania) Angelica Rozeanu	(Hungary) Gizi Farkas	(Austria) Gertrude Pritzi
Women's singles	(Romania) Angelica Rozeanu	(Hungary) Gizi Farkas	(United States) Leah Thall
Men's Doubles	(Czechoslovakia) Ivan Andreadis (Czechoslovakia) Bohumil Váňa	(Hungary) József Kóczián (Hungary) Ferenc Sidó	(Czechoslovakia) Ladislav Štípek (Czechoslovakia) František Tokár
Men's Doubles	(Czechoslovakia) Ivan Andreadis (Czechoslovakia) Bohumil Váňa	(Hungary) József Kóczián (Hungary) Ferenc Sidó	(England) Jack Carrington (England) Johnny Leach
Women's Doubles	(England) Diane Rowe (England) Rosalind Rowe	(Romania) Angelica Rozeanu (Romania) Sári Szász	(Hungary) Gizi Farkas (Hungary) Rozsi Karpati
Women's Doubles	(England) Diane Rowe (England) Rosalind Rowe	(Romania) Angelica Rozeanu (Romania) Sári Szász	(United States) Peggy Ichkoff (United States) Leah Thall
Mixed doubles	(Czechoslovakia) Bohumil Váňa (Romania) Angelica Rozeanu	(Socialist Federal Republic of Yugoslavia) Vilim Harangozo (Austria) Ermelinde Wertl	(England) Johnny Leach (England) Diane Rowe
Mixed doubles	(Czechoslovakia) Bohumil Váňa (Romania) Angelica Rozeanu	(Socialist Federal Republic of Yugoslavia) Vilim Harangozo (Austria) Ermelinde Wertl	(Hungary) József Kóczián (Hungary) Rozsi Karpati
