= 1955 World Table Tennis Championships – Mixed doubles =

1955 Mixed doubles

The 1955 World Table Tennis Championships mixed doubles was the 22nd edition of the mixed doubles championship.

Kálmán Szepesi and Éva Kóczián defeated Aubrey Simons and Helen Elliot in the final by three sets to two.

== Results ==
Round of 16
(Hungary) Josef Somogyi (Hungary) Zsuzsa Fantusz	5	18	11
(England) Aubrey Simons (Scotland) Helen Elliot	21	21	21
(Japan) Ichiro Ogimura (Japan) Kiiko Watanabe	3
(Socialist Federal Republic of Yugoslavia) Vilim Harangozo (Austria) Gertrude Pritzi	1
(Hungary) József Kóczián (Hungary) Ilona Kerekes	3
(Czechoslovakia) Ludvík Vyhnanovský (Czechoslovakia) Libuše Grafková	2
(Japan) Toshiaki Tanaka (Japan) Shizuki Narahara	21	18	21	13	22
(England) Johnny Leach (England) Diane Rowe	15	21	12	21	20
(Hungary) Kálmán Szepesi (Hungary) Éva Kóczián	3
(Socialist Federal Republic of Yugoslavia) Žarko Dolinar (Austria) Ermelinde Wertl	0
(Japan) Kichii Tamasu (Japan) Yoshiko Tanaka	3
(Romania) Toma Reiter (Romania) Sári Szász	1
(Czechoslovakia) Ladislav Štípek (Czechoslovakia) Eliška Krejčová	3
(Hungary) László Földy (Hungary) Agnes Almási	1
(Japan) Yoshio Tomita (Japan) Fujie Eguchi	3
(United States) Dick Miles (United States) Sally Prouty	0

Quarterfinals
(England) Simons (Scotland) Elliot	15	22	14	21	21
(Japan) Ogimura (Japan) Watanabe	21	20	21	16	13
(Hungary) Kóczián (Hungary) Kerekes	0
(Japan) Tanaka (Japan) Narahara	3
(Hungary) Szepesi (Hungary) Kóczián	8	21	22	16	21
(Japan) Tamasu (Japan) Tanaka	21	19	20	21	19
(Czechoslovakia) Štípek (Czechoslovakia) Krejčová	3
(Japan) Tomita (Japan) Eguchi	0

Semifinals
(England) Simons (Scotland) Elliot	23	21	21	15	21
(Japan) Tanaka (Japan) Narahara	25	13	14	21	13
(Hungary) Szepesi (Hungary) Kóczián	21	21	21
(Czechoslovakia) Štípek (Czechoslovakia) Krejčová	5	11	15

Final
(England) Simons (Scotland) Elliot	21	18	21	18	16
(Hungary) Szepesi (Hungary) Kóczián	18	21	18	21	21

== See also ==
List of World Table Tennis Championships medalists
