= 1953 World Table Tennis Championships – Women's doubles =

1953 Women's doubles

The 1953 World Table Tennis Championships women's doubles was the 19th edition of the women's doubles championship. Gizi Farkas and Angelica Rozeanu defeated Diane Rowe and Rosalind Rowe in the final by three sets to one.

== Results ==
Round of 16
(Hungary) Gizi Farkas (Romania) Angelica Rozeanu	3
(Sweden) Inga Brehmer (Sweden) Signhild Tegner	0
(Wales) Audrey Bates (Wales) Betty Gray	21	21	21
(West Germany) Berti Capellmann (Romania) Liliana Ciulianu	14	17	12
(Hungary) Zsuzsa Fantusz (Hungary) Edit Sági	3
(Romania) Sári Szász-Kolozsvári (Romania) Ella Zeller	1
(Romania) Tolna (Romania) Teodora Florescu	0
(Czechoslovakia) Květa Hrušková (Czechoslovakia) Eliška Krejčová	3
(England) Kathleen Best (Austria) Ermelinde Wertl	21	21	21
(Romania) Iudit Grunwald (Romania) Luci Slavescu	16	18	14
(Hungary) Éva Kóczián (Hungary) Agnes Almási	3
(Austria) Gertrude Pritzi (Romania) Georgita Strugaru	0
(Czechoslovakia) Eva Cedlová (Czechoslovakia) Hana Vhynanovská	w/o
(Romania) Baikan (Romania) Maria Golopenta	18	6	16
(England) Diane Rowe (England) Rosalind Rowe	21	21	21

Quarterfinals
(Hungary) Farkas (Romania) Rozeanu	21	21	21
(Wales) Bates (Wales) Gray	5	13	7
(Hungary) Fantusz (Hungary) Sági	22	22	16	13	21
(Czechoslovakia) Hrušková (Czechoslovakia) Krejčová	20	20	21	21	16
(England) Best (Austria) Wertl	12	21	21	21
(Hungary) Kóczián (Hungary) Almási	21	14	14	18
(Czechoslovakia) Cedlová (Czechoslovakia) Vhynanovská	10	17	21	21	22
(England) Rowe D (England) Rowe R	21	21	18	19	24

Semifinals
(Hungary) Farkas (Romania) Rozeanu	21	21	21
(Hungary) Fantusz (Hungary) Sági	12	12	14
(England) Best (Austria) Wertl	12	12	17
(England) Rowe D (England) Rowe R	21	21	21

Final
(Hungary) Farkas (Romania) Rozeanu	21	21	18	21
(England) Rowe D (England) Rowe R	9	9	21	18

== See also ==
List of World Table Tennis Championships medalists
