= 1953 World Table Tennis Championships – Mixed doubles =

1953 Mixed doubles

The 1953 World Table Tennis Championships mixed doubles was the 20th edition of the mixed doubles championship.

Ferenc Sidó and Angelica Rozeanu defeated Žarko Dolinar and Ermelinde Wertl in the final by three sets to two.

== Results ==
Round of 16
(England) Johnny Leach (England) Diane Rowe	21	21	18	21
(Hungary) Kálmán Szepesi (Hungary) Edit Sági	18	16	21	13
(Socialist Federal Republic of Yugoslavia) Žarko Dolinar (Austria) Ermelinde Wertl	3
(Czechoslovakia) Ladislav Štípek (Czechoslovakia) Eliška Krejčová	1
(England) Brian Kennedy (England) Kathleen Best	21	21	21
(Czechoslovakia) František Tokár (Czechoslovakia) Eva Cedlová	15	15	18
(Hungary) József Kóczián (Hungary) Gizi Farkas	3
(Sweden) Liss Larsson (Sweden) Anita Babichian	0
(England) Viktor Barna (England) Rosalind Rowe	21	21	21
(Romania) Toma Reiter (Romania) Sári Szász	19	16	18
(Hungary) László Földy (Hungary) Éva Kóczián	3
(West Germany) Bernhard Vossebein (West Germany) Berti Capellmann	2
(Czechoslovakia) Václav Tereba (Czechoslovakia) Květa Hrušková	3
(West Germany) Heinz Reimann (West Germany) Liane Rodel	1
(Hungary) Ferenc Sidó (Romania) Angelica Rozeanu	3
(Netherlands) Wim Stoop (Romania) Eugenia Metopadov	0

Quarterfinals
(England) Leach (England) Rowe D	16	20	21	18
(Socialist Federal Republic of Yugoslavia) Dolinar (Austria) Wertl	21	22	19	21
(England) Kennedy (England) Best	20	21	19	17
(Hungary) Kóczián (Hungary) Farkas	22	12	21	21
(England) Barna (England) Rowe R	18	18	21	21	12
(Hungary) Földy (Hungary) Kóczián	21	21	14	9	21
(Czechoslovakia) Tereba (Czechoslovakia) Hrušková	14	10	18
(Hungary) Sidó (Romania) Rozeanu	21	21	21

Semifinals
(Socialist Federal Republic of Yugoslavia) Dolinar (Austria) Wertl	16	21	21	21
(Hungary) Kóczián (Hungary) Farkas	21	17	18	15
(Hungary) Földy (Hungary) Kóczián	12	15	13
(Hungary) Sidó (Romania) Rozeanu	21	21	21

Final
(Socialist Federal Republic of Yugoslavia) Dolinar (Austria) Wertl	21	19	21	19	19
(Hungary) Sidó (Romania) Rozeanu	9	21	10	21	21

== See also ==
- List of World Table Tennis Championships medalists
