= 1950 World Table Tennis Championships =

The 1950 World Table Tennis Championships were held in Budapest from January 29 to February 5, 1950.

== Medalists ==
=== Team ===
Event	Gold	Silver	Bronze
Swaythling Cup; Men's Team	Czechoslovakia; Ivan Andreadis; Max Marinko; Václav Tereba; František Tokár; Bohumil Váňa	Hungary; József Farkas; József Kóczián; Ferenc Sidó; Ferenc Soos; László Várkonyi	England; Richard Bergmann; Bernard Crouch; Johnny Leach; Aubrey Simons; Harry Venner
Swaythling Cup; Men's Team	Czechoslovakia; Ivan Andreadis; Max Marinko; Václav Tereba; František Tokár; Bohumil Váňa	Hungary; József Farkas; József Kóczián; Ferenc Sidó; Ferenc Soos; László Várkonyi	France; Alex Agopoff; Michel Haguenauer; Michel Lanskoy; René Roothooft
Corbillon Cup; Women's team	Romania; Angelica Rozeanu; Luci Slavescu; Sári Szász-Kolozsvári	Hungary; Gizi Farkas; Rozsi Karpati; Ilona Király; Ilona Solyom	England; Dora Beregi-Devenney; Vera Dace-Thomas; Peggy Franks; Pinkie Barnes
Corbillon Cup; Women's team	Romania; Angelica Rozeanu; Luci Slavescu; Sári Szász-Kolozsvári	Hungary; Gizi Farkas; Rozsi Karpati; Ilona Király; Ilona Solyom	Czechoslovakia; Eliska Fürstova; Květa Hrušková; Marie Kettnerová; Ida Kotátkova

=== Individual ===
Event	Gold	Silver	Bronze
Men's singles	(England) Richard Bergmann	(Hungary) Ferenc Soos	(Hungary) Ferenc Sidó
Men's singles	(England) Richard Bergmann	(Hungary) Ferenc Soos	(Czechoslovakia) Ivan Andreadis
Women's singles	(Romania) Angelica Rozeanu	(Hungary) Gizi Farkas	(Hungary) Rozsi Karpati
Women's singles	(Romania) Angelica Rozeanu	(Hungary) Gizi Farkas	(Romania) Sári Szász
Men's Doubles	(Hungary) Ferenc Sidó (Hungary) Ferenc Soos	(Czechoslovakia) Ivan Andreadis (Czechoslovakia) František Tokár	(Czechoslovakia) Ladislav Štípek (Czechoslovakia) Bohumil Váňa
Men's Doubles	(Hungary) Ferenc Sidó (Hungary) Ferenc Soos	(Czechoslovakia) Ivan Andreadis (Czechoslovakia) František Tokár	(Czechoslovakia) Václav Tereba (Czechoslovakia) Josef Turnovský
Women's doubles	(England) Dora Beregi (Scotland) Helen Elliot	(Hungary) Gizi Farkas (Romania) Angelica Rozeanu	(England) Vera Dace (England) Peggy Franks
Women's doubles	(England) Dora Beregi (Scotland) Helen Elliot	(Hungary) Gizi Farkas (Romania) Angelica Rozeanu	(Czechoslovakia) Eliska Fürstova (Czechoslovakia) Květa Hrušková
Mixed doubles	(Hungary) Ferenc Sidó (Hungary) Gizi Farkas	(Czechoslovakia) Bohumil Váňa (Czechoslovakia) Květa Hrušková	(Czechoslovakia) Ladislav Štípek (Romania) Angelica Rozeanu
Mixed doubles	(Hungary) Ferenc Sidó (Hungary) Gizi Farkas	(Czechoslovakia) Bohumil Váňa (Czechoslovakia) Květa Hrušková	(Czechoslovakia) Ivan Andreadis (Czechoslovakia) Eliška Fürstová
