= 1955 World Table Tennis Championships =

1955 edition of the World Table Tennis Championships

The 1955 World Table Tennis Championships were held in Utrecht from April 16 to April 24, 1955.

== Medalists ==
=== Team ===
Event	Gold	Silver	Bronze
Swaythling Cup; Men's Team	Japan; Ichiro Ogimura; Kichii Tamasu; Toshiaki Tanaka; Yoshio Tomita	Czechoslovakia; Ivan Andreadis; Ladislav Štípek; Václav Tereba; Bohumil Váňa; Ludvik Vyhnanovsky	Hungary; László Földy; József Kóczián; Ferenc Sidó; Josef Somogyi; Kálmán Szepesi
Swaythling Cup; Men's Team	Japan; Ichiro Ogimura; Kichii Tamasu; Toshiaki Tanaka; Yoshio Tomita	Czechoslovakia; Ivan Andreadis; Ladislav Štípek; Václav Tereba; Bohumil Váňa; Ludvik Vyhnanovsky	England; Richard Bergmann; Brian Kennedy; Johnny Leach; Bryan Merrett; Alan Rhodes
Corbillon Cup; Women's Team	Romania; Angelica Rozeanu; Sari Szasz; Ella Zeller	Japan; Fujie Eguchi; Shizuki Narahara; Yoshiko Tanaka; Kiiko Watanabe	England; Ann Haydon; Diane Rowe; Rosalind Rowe; Jean Winn

=== Individual ===
Event	Gold	Silver	Bronze
Men's singles	(Japan) Toshiaki Tanaka	(Socialist Federal Republic of Yugoslavia) Žarko Dolinar	(France) Stephen Cafiero
Men's singles	(Japan) Toshiaki Tanaka	(Socialist Federal Republic of Yugoslavia) Žarko Dolinar	(Hungary) Ferenc Sidó
Women's singles	(Romania) Angelica Rozeanu	(Austria) Ermelinde Rumpler-Wertl	(Japan) Kiiko Watanabe
Women's singles	(Romania) Angelica Rozeanu	(Austria) Ermelinde Rumpler-Wertl	(Hungary) Éva Kóczián
Men's doubles	(Czechoslovakia) Ivan Andreadis (Czechoslovakia) Ladislav Štípek	(Socialist Federal Republic of Yugoslavia) Žarko Dolinar (Socialist Federal Republic of Yugoslavia) Vilim Harangozo	(Japan) Ichiro Ogimura (Japan) Yoshio Tomita
Men's doubles	(Czechoslovakia) Ivan Andreadis (Czechoslovakia) Ladislav Štípek	(Socialist Federal Republic of Yugoslavia) Žarko Dolinar (Socialist Federal Republic of Yugoslavia) Vilim Harangozo	(Hungary) József Kóczián (Hungary) Ferenc Sidó
Women's doubles	(Romania) Angelica Rozeanu (Romania) Ella Zeller	(England) Diane Rowe (England) Rosalind Rowe	(Japan) Shizuki Narahara (Japan) Yoshiko Tanaka
Women's doubles	(Romania) Angelica Rozeanu (Romania) Ella Zeller	(England) Diane Rowe (England) Rosalind Rowe	(Japan) Fujie Eguchi (Japan) Kiiko Watanabe
Mixed doubles	(Hungary) Kálmán Szepesi (Hungary) Éva Kóczián	(England) Aubrey Simons (Scotland) Helen Elliot	(Japan) Toshiaki Tanaka (Japan) Shizuki Narahara
Mixed doubles	(Hungary) Kálmán Szepesi (Hungary) Éva Kóczián	(England) Aubrey Simons (Scotland) Helen Elliot	(Czechoslovakia) Ladislav Štípek (Czechoslovakia) Eliška Krejčová
