= 1950 World Table Tennis Championships – Mixed doubles =

1950 Mixed doubles

The 1950 World Table Tennis Championships mixed doubles was the 17th edition of the mixed doubles championship.

Ferenc Sidó and Gizi Farkas defeated Bohumil Váňa and Květa Hrušková in the final by three sets to nil.

== Results ==
Round of 16
(Hungary) Ferenc Sidó (Hungary) Gizi Farkas	3
(Hungary) Károly Jávor (Hungary) Ida Rozgonyi	0
(England) Viktor Barna (Scotland) Helen Elliot	21	21	21
(Sweden) Bengt Grive (Sweden) Eina Ericson	18	14	16
(Hungary) Ferenc Soos (Hungary) Rozsi Karpati	0
(Czechoslovakia) Ivan Andreadis (Czechoslovakia) Eliška Fürstová	3
(France) René Roothooft (Romania) Luci Slavescu	21	17	21	12	4
(England) Johnny Leach (England) Peggy Franks	17	21	19	21	21
(Czechoslovakia) Ladislav Štípek (Romania) Angelica Rozeanu	3
(Sweden) Weine Fredriksson (Romania) Sári Szász	0
(England) Aubrey Simons (England) Dora Beregi	3
(Hungary) Gyuri Csillik (Hungary) Éva Solyom	1
(England) Richard Bergmann (England) Vera Dace	14	13	21	21	21
(Austria) Heinrich Bednar (Austria) Gertrude Pritzi	21	21	8	10	7
(Czechoslovakia) Bohumil Váňa (Czechoslovakia) Květa Hrušková	3
(Sweden) Tage Flisberg (Sweden) Jris Persson	1

Quarterfinals
(Hungary) Sidó (Hungary) Farkas	21	21	21
(England) Barna (Scotland) Elliot	12	15	18
(Czechoslovakia) Andreadis (Czechoslovakia) Fürstová	21	21	22
(England) Leach (England) Franks	18	19	20
(Czechoslovakia) Štípek (Romania) Rozeanu	20	21	21	21
(England) Simons (England) Beregi	22	14	11	15
(England) Bergmann (England) Dace	21	15	17	12
(Czechoslovakia) Váňa (Czechoslovakia) Hrušková	19	21	21	21

Semifinals
(Hungary) Sidó (Hungary) Farkas	21	21	19	21	21
(Czechoslovakia) Andreadis (Czechoslovakia) Fürstová	16	23	21	19	11
(Czechoslovakia) Štípek (Romania) Rozeanu	15	15	21	13
(Czechoslovakia) Váňa (Czechoslovakia) Hrušková	21	21	18	21

Final
(Hungary) Sidó (Hungary) Farkas	21	21	21
(Czechoslovakia) Váňa (Czechoslovakia) Hrušková	17	18	12

== See also ==
List of World Table Tennis Championships medalists
