= 1950 World Table Tennis Championships – Men's team =

1950 Swaythling Cup (men's team)

The 1950 World Table Tennis Championships – Swaythling Cup (men's team) was the 17th edition of the men's team championship.

Czechoslovakia won the gold medal defeating Hungary 5–3 in the final. England and France both won a bronze medal after finishing second in their respective groups.

== Medalists ==
=== Team ===
Event	Gold	Silver	Bronze
	Czechoslovakia; Ivan Andreadis; Max Marinko; Václav Tereba; František Tokár; Bohumil Váňa	Hungary; József Farkas; József Kóczián; Ferenc Sidó; Ferenc Soos; László Várkonyi	England; Richard Bergmann; Bernard Crouch; Johnny Leach; Aubrey Simons; Harry Venner
	Czechoslovakia; Ivan Andreadis; Max Marinko; Václav Tereba; František Tokár; Bohumil Váňa	Hungary; József Farkas; József Kóczián; Ferenc Sidó; Ferenc Soos; László Várkonyi	France; Alex Agopoff; Michel Haguenauer; Michel Lanskoy; René Roothooft

== Swaythling Cup tables ==
=== Group A ===
Pos	Team	P	W	L	Pts
1	Hungary	6	6	0	12
2	France	6	5	1	10
3	Switzerland	6	4	2	8
4	India	6	3	3	6
5	Israel	6	2	4	4
6	Italy	6	1	5	2
7	Denmark	6	0	6	0

+ United States and Netherlands both withdrew from Group A

=== Group B ===
Pos	Team	P	W	L	Pts
1	Czechoslovakia	8	8	0	16
2	England	8	7	1	14
3	Sweden	8	6	2	12
4	Austria	8	5	3	10
5	Poland	8	4	4	8
6	Wales	8	3	5	6
7	Brazil	8	2	6	4
8	(Republic of Ireland) Ireland	8	1	7	2
9	New Zealand	8	0	8	0

== Final ==
Czechoslovakia 5		Hungary 3	Score
Andreadis	lost to	?	?
Andreadis	bt	Kóczián	21-19 19-21 21-15
Váňa	lost to	Sidó	16-21 13-21
Váňa	bt	Kóczián	21-10 21-9
Váňa	bt	Soos	21-14 21-16
Tereba	lost to	Soos	18-21 19-21
Tereba	bt	Sidó	27-25 22-20
Tereba	bt	Kóczián	w/o+

+ Kóczián withdrew injured after suffering from badly blistered feet

== See also ==
List of World Table Tennis Championships medalists
