= 1951 World Table Tennis Championships – Women's team =

1951 Corbillon Cup (women's team)

The 1951 World Table Tennis Championships – Corbillon Cup (women's team) was the 11th edition of the women's team championship.

Romania won the gold medal defeating Austria 3–1 in the final. England and Wales won bronze medals after finishing second in their respective groups.

== Medalists ==
Event	Gold	Silver	Bronze
	Romania; Paraschiva Patulea; Angelica Rozeanu; Sári Szász; Ella Zeller	Austria; Gertrude Pritzi; Ermelinde Wertl; Gertrude Wutzl	England; Peggy Franks; Joyce Roberts; Diane Rowe; Rosalind Rowe
	Romania; Paraschiva Patulea; Angelica Rozeanu; Sári Szász; Ella Zeller	Austria; Gertrude Pritzi; Ermelinde Wertl; Gertrude Wutzl	Wales; Audrey Bates; Audrey Coombs; Betty Gray

== Final tables ==
=== Group A ===
Pos	Team	P	W	L
1	Austria	7	7	0
2	England	7	6	1
3	Hungary	7	5	2
4	United States	7	4	3
5	Germany	7	3	4
6	(Socialist Federal Republic of Yugoslavia) Yugoslavia	7	2	5
7	Italy	7	1	6
8	Switzerland	7	0	7

Brazil withdrew from Group A

=== Group B ===
Pos	Team	P	W	L
1	Romania	8	8	0
2	Wales	8	6	2
3	Scotland	8	6	2
4	Belgium	8	5	3
5	Czechoslovakia	8	5	3
6	France	8	2	6
7	India	8	2	6
8	Egypt	8	2	6
9	Netherlands	8	0	8

== Final ==
Romania 3		Austria 1	Score
Rozeanu	bt	Wertl	21–17 21–18
Szász	bt	Pritzi	21–15 21–10
Rozeanu & Szász	lost to	Pritzi & Wertl	21–13 16–21 21–23
Rozeanu	bt	Pritzi	21–7 21–2

== See also ==
List of World Table Tennis Championships medalists
