= 1953 World Table Tennis Championships – Men's team =

1953 Swaythling Cup (men's team)

The 1953 World Table Tennis Championships – Swaythling Cup (men's team) was the 20th edition of the men's team championship.

England won the gold medal defeating Hungary 5–3 in the final. Czechoslovakia and France both won a bronze medal after finishing second in their respective groups.

== Medalists ==
Event	Gold	Silver	Bronze
	England; Richard Bergmann; Adrian Haydon; Brian Kennedy; Johnny Leach; Aubrey Simons	Hungary; Elemér Gyetvai; József Kóczián; Miklós Sebők; Ferenc Sidó; Kálmán Szepesi	France; Guy Amouretti; Michel Haguenauer; Michel Lanskoy; René Roothooft; Jean-Claude Sala
	England; Richard Bergmann; Adrian Haydon; Brian Kennedy; Johnny Leach; Aubrey Simons	Hungary; Elemér Gyetvai; József Kóczián; Miklós Sebők; Ferenc Sidó; Kálmán Szepesi	Czechoslovakia; Ivan Andreadis; Václav Tereba; František Tokár; Bohumil Váňa; Ludvík Vyhnanovský

== Swaythling Cup tables ==
=== Group A ===
Pos	Team	P	W	L	Pts
1	England	6	6	0	12
2	Czechoslovakia	6	5	1	10
3	(Socialist Federal Republic of Yugoslavia) Yugoslavia	6	4	2	8
4	China	6	3	3	6
5	Sweden	6	2	4	4
6	Austria	6	1	5	2
7	Switzerland	6	0	6	0

=== Group B ===
Pos	Team	P	W	L	Pts
1	Hungary	6	6	0	12
2	France	6	5	1	10
3	Romania	6	4	2	8
4	Germany	6	3	3	6
5	Netherlands	6	2	4	4
6	Bulgaria	6	1	5	2
7	Brazil	6	0	6	0

== Final ==
England 5		Hungary 3	Score
Bergmann	lost to	Sidó	15–21 15–21
Bergmann	bt	Kóczián	21–15 21–17
Bergmann	bt	Gyetvai	12–21 21–6 21–9
Leach	lost to	Sidó	23–25 21–19 17–21
Leach	bt	Kóczián	21–17 22–20
Leach	bt	Gyetvai	21–15 15–21 21–17
Simons	bt	Kóczián	21–17 22–20
Simons	lost to	Sidó	18–21 21–18 16–21
Simons	v	Gyetvai	not played

== See also ==
List of World Table Tennis Championships medalists
