= 1951 World Table Tennis Championships – Men's team =

1951 Swaythling Cup (men's team)

The 1951 World Table Tennis Championships – Swaythling Cup (men's team) was the 18th edition of the men's team championship.

Czechoslovakia won the gold medal defeating Hungary 5–4 in the decisive final group match. Yugoslavia won a bronze medal after finishing third in the final group.

== Medalists ==
=== Team ===
Event	Gold	Silver	Bronze
Men's team	Czechoslovakia; Ivan Andreadis; Ladislav Štípek; Václav Tereba; František Tokár; Bohumil Váňa	Hungary; Jozsef Farkas; József Kóczián; Ferenc Sidó; Kálmán Szepesi; Elemér Gyetvai	Yugoslavia; Žarko Dolinar; Josip Gabric; Vilim Harangozo; Zdenko Uzorinac; Josip Vogrinc

== Swaythling Cup tables ==
=== Group A ===
Pos	Team	P	W	L	Pts
1	(Socialist Federal Republic of Yugoslavia) Yugoslavia	7	7	0	14
2	England	7	6	1	12
3	Sweden	7	5	2	10
4	Brazil	7	4	3	8
5	Wales	7	3	4	6
6	Egypt	7	2	5	4
7	Italy	7	1	6	2
8	Luxembourg	7	0	7	0

=== Group B ===
Pos	Team	P	W	L	Pts
1	Hungary	7	7	0	14
2	France	7	6	1	12
3	Vietnam	7	5	2	10
4	Germany	7	4	3	8
5	Austria	7	3	4	6
6	Netherlands	7	2	5	4
7	Portugal	7	1	6	2
8	New Zealand	7	0	7	0

=== Group C ===
Pos	Team	P	W	L	Pts
1	Czechoslovakia	7	7	0	14
2	United States	7	6	1	12
3	Switzerland	7	4	3	8
4	India	7	4	3	8
5	Belgium	7	4	3	8
6	Iran	7	2	5	4
7	Israel	7	1	6	2
8	Greece	7	0	7	0

=== Final group ===
Pos	Team	P	W	L	Pts
1	Czechoslovakia	2	2	0	4
2	Hungary	2	1	1	2
3	(Socialist Federal Republic of Yugoslavia) Yugoslavia	2	0	2	0

== Decisive final group match ==
Czechoslovakia 5		Hungary 4	Score
Andreadis	bt	Kóczián	21–17 21–12
Andreadis	bt	Sidó	19–21 21–17 21–18
Andreadis	bt	Szepesi	21–9 22–20
Váňa	lost to	Sidó	18–2 21–17 19–21
Váňa	lost to	Kóczián	13–21 20–22
Váňa	bt	Szepesi	21–12 21–6
Tereba	bt	Szepesi	21–17 21–13
Tereba	lost to	Sidó	16–21 15–21
Tereba	lost to	Kóczián	14–21 15–21

== See also ==
- List of World Table Tennis Championships medalists
