= 1953 World Table Tennis Championships – Women's singles =

1953 Women's singles

The 1953 World Table Tennis Championships women's singles was the 20th edition of the women's singles championship. Angelica Rozeanu defeated Gizi Farkas in the final by three sets to one, to win a fourth consecutive title.

== Results ==
Round of 16
(Romania) Angelica Rozeanu	3
(Hungary) Zsuzsa Fantusz	0
(England) Kathleen Best	21	21	21
(Austria) Friederike Lauber	16	12	13
(England) Diane Rowe	21	21	21
(Romania) Luci Slavescu	16	18	18
(Austria) Ermelinde Wertl	3
(Czechoslovakia) Eva Cedlova	0
(England) Rosalind Rowe	15	19	21	21	21
(Hungary) Agnes Almasi-Simon	21	21	16	18	19
(Romania) Ella Zeller	3
(Czechoslovakia) Květa Hrušková	1
(Hungary) Edit Sági	3
(Romania) Georgita Strugaru	0
(Wales) Betty Gray	9	10	11
(Hungary) Gizi Farkas	21	21	21

Quarterfinals
(Romania) Rozeanu	22	21	21	21
(England) Best	24	14	13	13
(England) Rowe D	21	21	21
(Austria) Wertl	14	13	16
(England) Rowe R	21	21	21
(Romania) Zeller	16	13	17
(Hungary) Sági	15	28	12	10
(Hungary) Farkas	21	26	21	21

Semifinals
(Romania) Rozeanu	21	21	21
(England) Rowe D	9	13	27
(England) Rowe R	25	20	16	17
(Hungary) Farkas	23	22	21	21

Final
(Romania) Rozeanu	21	21	19	21
(Hungary) Farkas	11	19	21	16

== See also ==
List of World Table Tennis Championships medalists
