= 1950 World Table Tennis Championships – Women's team =

1950 Corbillon Cup (women's team)

The 1950 World Table Tennis Championships – Corbillon Cup (women's team) was the tenth edition of the women's team championship.

Romania won the gold medal defeating Hungary 3–2 in the final. England and Czechoslovakia won bronze medals after finishing second in their respective groups.

== Medalists ==
| Event | Gold | Silver | Bronze |
|---|---|---|---|
| | Romania; Angelica Rozeanu; Luci Slavescu; Sári Szász-Kolozsvári | Hungary; Gizi Farkas; Rozsi Karpati; Ilona Király; Ilona Solyom | England; Dora Beregi-Devenney; Vera Dace-Thomas; Peggy Franks; Pinkie Barnes |
| | Romania; Angelica Rozeanu; Luci Slavescu; Sári Szász-Kolozsvári | Hungary; Gizi Farkas; Rozsi Karpati; Ilona Király; Ilona Solyom | Czechoslovakia; Eliska Fürstova; Květa Hrušková; Marie Kettnerová; Ida Kotátkova |

== Final tables ==
=== Group A ===
| Pos | Team | P | W | L |
|---|---|---|---|---|
| 1 | Romania | 4 | 4 | 0 |
| 2 | England | 4 | 3 | 1 |
| 3 | Scotland | 4 | 2 | 2 |
| 4 | Italy | 4 | 1 | 3 |
| 5 | Wales | 4 | 0 | 4 |

=== Group B ===
| Pos | Team | P | W | L |
|---|---|---|---|---|
| 1 | Hungary | 4 | 4 | 0 |
| 2 | Czechoslovakia | 4 | 3 | 1 |
| 3 | France | 4 | 2 | 2 |
| 4 | Austria | 4 | 1 | 3 |
| 5 | Sweden | 4 | 0 | 4 |

== Final ==
| Romania 3 | | Hungary 2 | Score |
|---|---|---|---|
| Rozeanu | bt | Farkas | 21-18 21-19 |
| Rozeanu | bt | Karpati | 21-14 21-12 |
| Sári Szász-Kolozsvári | bt | Karpati | 21-17 21-15 |
| Sári Szász-Kolozsvári | lost to | Farkas | 9-21 4-21 |
| Slavescu & Rozeanu | lost to | Karpati & Farkas | 1-2 |

== See also ==
List of World Table Tennis Championships medalists
