= 1955 World Table Tennis Championships – Men's team =

1955 Swaythling Cup (men's team)

The 1955 World Table Tennis Championships – Swaythling Cup (men's team) was the 22nd edition of the men's team championship.

Japan won the gold medal defeating Czechoslovakia 5–3 in the final. England and Hungary won bronze medals after being defeated in the semi-finals.

== Medalists ==
Event	Gold	Silver	Bronze
	Japan; Ichiro Ogimura; Kichii Tamasu; Toshiaki Tanaka; Yoshio Tomita	Czechoslovakia; Ivan Andreadis; Ladislav Štípek; Václav Tereba; Bohumil Váňa; Ludvik Vyhnanovsky	Hungary; László Földy; József Kóczián; Ferenc Sidó; Josef Somogyi; Kálmán Szepesi
	Japan; Ichiro Ogimura; Kichii Tamasu; Toshiaki Tanaka; Yoshio Tomita	Czechoslovakia; Ivan Andreadis; Ladislav Štípek; Václav Tereba; Bohumil Váňa; Ludvik Vyhnanovsky	England; Richard Bergmann; Brian Kennedy; Johnny Leach; Bryan Merrett; Alan Rhodes

== Swaythling Cup tables ==
=== Group 1 ===
Pos	Team	P	W	L	Pts
1	Czechoslovakia	7	7	0	14
2	France	7	6	1	12
3	Brazil	7	4	3	8
4	Netherlands	7	4	3	8
5	Egypt	7	3	4	6
6	Italy	7	3	4	6
7	Guernsey	7	1	6	0
8	Jersey	7	0	7	0

=== Group 2 ===
Pos	Team	P	W	L	Pts
1	Hungary	7	7	0	14
2	United States	7	6	1	12
3	Sweden	7	5	2	10
4	Bulgaria	7	4	3	8
5	Portugal	7	3	4	6
6	(Republic of Ireland) Ireland	7	2	5	4
7	Denmark	7	1	6	2
8	Finland	7	0	6	0

=== Group 3 ===
Pos	Team	P	W	L	Pts
1	Japan	7	7	0	14
2	(Socialist Federal Republic of Yugoslavia) Yugoslavia	7	6	1	12
3	Vietnam	7	5	2	10
4	Austria	7	4	3	8
5	Australia	7	3	4	6
6	Belgium	7	2	5	4
7	Scotland	7	1	6	2
8	Norway	7	0	6	0

=== Group 4 ===
Pos	Team	P	W	L	Pts
1	England	7	7	0	14
2	Romania	7	6	1	12
3	Germany	7	5	2	10
4	Switzerland	7	4	3	8
5	Spain	7	3	4	6
6	Wales	7	2	5	4
7	Saarland	7	1	6	2
8	Lebanon	7	0	6	0

== Semifinals ==
Team One	Team two	Score
Czechoslovakia	England	5–1
Japan	Hungary	5–4

== Final ==
Japan 5		Czechoslovakia 3	Score
Ogimura	lost to	Andreadis	19-21 19–21
Ogimura	bt	Štípek	22-20 21–19
Ogimura	bt	Váňa	21-18 21–18
Tanaka	lost to	Andreadis	15-21 20–22
Tanaka	bt	Štípek	21-12 21–17
Tanaka	bt	Váňa	21-9 21–18
Tamasu	lost to	Andreadis	12-21 19–21
Tamasu	bt	Štípek	21-17 22–20
Tamasu	v	Váňa	not played

== See also ==
List of World Table Tennis Championships medalists
