= 1950 World Table Tennis Championships – Women's singles =

1950 Women's singles

The 1950 World Table Tennis Championships women's singles was the 17th edition of the women's singles championship. Angelica Rozeanu defeated Gizi Farkas in the final by three sets to nil, to win the title.

== Results ==
Round of 16
(Hungary) Gizi Farkas	3
(Romania) Luci Slavescu	0
(Scotland) Elisabeth Pithie	9	9	11
(Czechoslovakia) Eliška Fürstová	21	21	21
(England) Peggy Franks	18	21	14	17
(Romania) Sári Kolozsvári-Szász	21	19	21	21
(Czechoslovakia) Marie Kettnerová	1
(Austria) Gertrude Pritzi	3
(Czechoslovakia) Květa Hrušková	3
(Hungary) Edit Sági	0
(Hungary) Rózsi Kárpáti	3
(Scotland) Helen Elliot	2
(England) Vera Thomas-Dace	17	17	15
(Hungary) Eva Solyom II	21	21	21
(Hungary) Erzsébet Mezei	0
(Romania) Angelica Rozeanu	3

Quarterfinals
(Hungary) Farkas	21	21	21
(Czechoslovakia) Furstova	14	15	13
(Romania) Szász	12	22	21	6	12+
(Austria) Pritzi	21	20	11	21	6+
(Czechoslovakia) Hrušková	20	21	19	18
(Hungary) Kárpáti	22	19	21	21
(Hungary) Solyom	12	12	8
(Romania) Rozeanu	21	21	21

Semifinals
(Hungary) Farkas	21	16	21	21
(Romania) Szász	13	21	12	13
(Hungary) Kárpáti	11	14	4
(Romania) Rozeanu	21	21	21

Final
(Hungary) Farkas	20	15	18
(Romania) Rozeanu	22	21	21

+ Time limit rule applied

== See also ==
List of World Table Tennis Championships medalists
