= 1955 World Table Tennis Championships – Men's singles =

1955 Men's singles

The 1955 World Table Tennis Championships men's singles was the 22nd edition of the men's singles championship.

Toshiaki Tanaka defeated Žarko Dolinar in the final, winning three sets to nil to secure the title.

== Results ==
Round of 16
(Hungary) József Kóczián	21	19	18	19
(France) Stephen Cafiero	11	21	21	21
(Japan) Johnny Leach	23	21	21
(Hungary) László Földy	21	13	7
(Japan) Toshiaki Tanaka	18	21	21	7	21
(Socialist Federal Republic of Yugoslavia) Josip Vegrinc	21	17	8	21	15
(Romania) Toma Reiter	21	21	25
(England) Brian Kennedy	16	13	23
(England) Richard Bergmann	21	18	21	21
(Hungary) Kálmán Szepesi	9	21	15	11
(Socialist Federal Republic of Yugoslavia) Žarko Dolinar	21	21	21
(Romania) Matei Gantner	15	13	15
(Hungary) Ferenc Sidó	21	21	21
(United States) Harry Hirschkowitz	18	11	17
(Japan) Ichiro Ogimura	17	20	19
(Hungary) Josef Somogyi	21	22	21

Quarterfinals
(France) Cafiero	21	21	7	22
(England) Leach	16	15	21	20
(Japan) Tanaka	21	21	21
(Romania) Reiter	12	10	15
(England) Bergmann	21	19	12	14
(Socialist Federal Republic of Yugoslavia) Dolinar	19	21	21	21
(Hungary) Sidó	21	21	21
(Hungary) Somogyi	19	18	13

Semifinals
(France) Cafiero	11	15	17
(Japan) Tanaka	21	21	21
(Socialist Federal Republic of Yugoslavia) Dolinar	11	21	22	21
(Hungary) Sidó	21	15	20	18

Final
(Japan) Tanaka	21	21	21
(Socialist Federal Republic of Yugoslavia) Dolinar	12	9	14

== See also ==
List of World Table Tennis Championships medalists
