= 1953 World Table Tennis Championships – Men's doubles =

1953 Men's doubles

The 1953 World Table Tennis Championships men's doubles was the 20th edition of the men's doubles championship. Ferenc Sidó and József Kóczián won the title after defeating Richard Bergmann and Johnny Leach in the final by three sets to two.

== Results ==
Round of 16
(England) Johnny Leach (England) Richard Bergmann	21	21	21
(Romania) Alex Grunfeld (Romania) Pitu Popp	16	16	11
(Socialist Federal Republic of Yugoslavia) Žarko Dolinar (Socialist Federal Republic of Yugoslavia) Vilim Harangozo	3
(France) René Roothooft (France) Michel Lanskoy	2
(Sweden) Liss Larsson (Sweden) Tor Jonsson	w/o
(Brazil) Dagoberto Midosi (Brazil) Ivan Severo	scr
(England) Viktor Barna (England) Adrian Haydon	21	12	21	21
(Czechoslovakia) Václav Tereba (Czechoslovakia) Ladislav Štípek	18	21	19	15
(Hungary) József Kóczián (Hungary) Ferenc Sidó	3
(Sweden) Tage Flisberg (Sweden) Weine Fredriksson	0
(Netherlands) Cor du Buy (Netherlands) Willie Van Zoelen	3
(West Germany) Helmut Hanschmann (West Germany) Heinz Reimann	1
(England) Brian Kennedy (England) Aubrey Simons	21	21	21
(Hungary) Miklós Sebők (Hungary) László Földy	12	14	17
(Czechoslovakia) Ivan Andreadis (Czechoslovakia) Bohumil Váňa	3
(Austria) Heinrich Bednar (Austria) Heribert Just	1

Quarterfinals
(England) Leach (England) Bergmann	24	13	21	21
(Socialist Federal Republic of Yugoslavia) Dolinar (Socialist Federal Republic of Yugoslavia) Harangozo	22	21	14	7
(Sweden) Larsson (Sweden) Jonsson	15	21	15	12
(England) Barna (England) Haydon	21	19	21	21
(Hungary) Kóczián (Hungary) Sidó	21	21	25	21
(Netherlands) Cor du Buy (Netherlands) Van Zoelen	12	11	27	16
(England) Kennedy (England) Simons	11	12	17
(Czechoslovakia) Andreadis (Czechoslovakia) Váňa	21	21	21

Semifinals
(England) Leach (England) Bergmann	21	21	18	21
(England) Barna (England) Haydon	13	15	21	12
(Hungary) Kóczián (Hungary) Sidó	13	18	21	21	21
(Czechoslovakia) Andreadis (Czechoslovakia) Váňa	21	21	11	18	13

Final
(England) Leach (England) Bergmann	21	21	21	18	19
(Hungary) Kóczián (Hungary) Sidó	23	19	12	21	21

== See also ==
List of World Table Tennis Championships medalists
