= 1953 World Table Tennis Championships – Women's team =

1953 Corbillon Cup (women's team)

The 1953 World Table Tennis Championships – Corbillon Cup (women's team) was the 13th edition of the women's team championship.

Romania won the gold medal defeating England 3–0 in the final. Austria and Hungary won bronze medals after finishing second in their respective groups.

== Medalists ==
| Event | Gold | Silver | Bronze |
|---|---|---|---|
| | Romania; Angelica Rozeanu; Sari Szasz; Ella Zeller | England; Kathleen Best; Diane Rowe; Rosalind Rowe | Austria; Friederike Lauber; Gertrude Pritzi; Ermelinde Wertl |
| | Romania; Angelica Rozeanu; Sari Szasz; Ella Zeller | England; Kathleen Best; Diane Rowe; Rosalind Rowe | Hungary; Agnes Almási-Simon; Zsuzsa Fantusz; Gizi Gervai-Farkas; Éva Kóczián |

== Final tables ==
=== Group A ===
| Pos | Team | P | W | L |
|---|---|---|---|---|
| 1 | England | 4 | 4 | 0 |
| 2 | Hungary | 4 | 3 | 1 |
| 3 | Czechoslovakia | 4 | 2 | 2 |
| 4 | China | 4 | 1 | 3 |
| 5 | Germany | 4 | 0 | 5 |

=== Group B ===
| Pos | Team | P | W | L |
|---|---|---|---|---|
| 1 | Romania | 4 | 4 | 0 |
| 2 | Austria | 4 | 3 | 1 |
| 3 | Wales | 4 | 2 | 2 |
| 4 | Sweden | 4 | 1 | 3 |
| 5 | Bulgaria | 4 | 0 | 4 |

== Final ==
| Romania 3 | | England 0 | Score |
|---|---|---|---|
| Rozeanu | bt | Rowe R | 21–9 21–10 |
| Szász | bt | Rowe D | 17–21 21–19 21–19 |
| Rozeanu & Zeller | bt | Rowe R & Rowe D | 21–15 21–14 |

== See also ==
List of World Table Tennis Championships medalists
