= 1951 World Table Tennis Championships – Men's doubles =

1951 Men's doubles

The 1951 World Table Tennis Championships men's doubles was the 18th edition of the men's doubles championship. Bohumil Váňa and Ivan Andreadis won the title after defeating József Kóczián and Ferenc Sidó in the final by three sets to nil.

== Results ==
Round of 16
(Hungary) József Kóczián (Hungary) Ferenc Sidó	19	21	21	21
(Sweden) Weine Fredriksson (Sweden) Sven Cedeholm	21	16	14	10
(Czechoslovakia) Václav Tereba (Czechoslovakia) Rostislav Koudelka	21	21	18	21
(Wales) Michael Jones (Wales) Gerald Chugg	15	15	21	18
(South Vietnam) Mai Van Hao (South Vietnam) Nguyen Van Hao	16	19	19
(Egypt) Fawzi Al Abrashy (Egypt) Abdel Hay Abou Heif	21	21	21
(England) Johnny Leach (England) Jack Carrington	21	21	21
(United States) John Somael (United States) Marty Reisman	14	16	16
(Czechoslovakia) František Tokár (Czechoslovakia) Ladislav Štípek	21	21	21
(Belgium) Guy Delabarre (Belgium) Wally Van Gansen	16	18	16
(England) Aubrey Simons (England) Ron Crayden	w/o
(Socialist Federal Republic of Yugoslavia) Vilim Harangozo (Socialist Federal Republic of Yugoslavia) Žarko Dolinar	scr
(Austria) Heribert Just (Austria) Otto Eckl	21	17	21	16	22
(Hungary) Kálmán Szepesi (Hungary) József Farkas	8	21	17	21	20
(Czechoslovakia) Bohumil Váňa (Czechoslovakia) Ivan Andreadis	21	16	21	21
(England) Viktor Barna (England) Adrian Haydon	15	21	13	8

Quarterfinals
(Hungary) Kóczián (Hungary) Sidó	16	21	21	21	21
(Czechoslovakia) Tereba (Czechoslovakia) Koudelka	21	23	18	17	13
(Egypt) Al Abrashy (Egypt) Abou Heif	20	9	16
(England) Leach (England) Carrington	22	21	21
(Czechoslovakia) Tokár (Czechoslovakia) Štípek	21	21	21
(England) Simons (England) Crayden	17	13	12
(Austria) Just (Austria) Eckl	21	21	21
(Czechoslovakia) Váňa (Czechoslovakia) Andreadis	16	15	9

Semifinals
(Hungary) Kóczián (Hungary) Sidó	21	20	22	21
(England) Leach (England) Carrington	14	22	20	10
(Czechoslovakia) Tokár (Czechoslovakia) Štípek	12	21	12	21	12
(Czechoslovakia) Vana (Czechoslovakia) Andreadis	21	19	21	18	21

Final
(Hungary) Sidó (Hungary) Kóczián	13	12	19
(Czechoslovakia) Vana (Czechoslovakia) Andreadis	21	21	21

== See also ==
List of World Table Tennis Championships medalists
