= 1953 World Table Tennis Championships – Men's singles =

1953 Men's singles

The 1953 World Table Tennis Championships men's singles was the 20th edition of the men's singles championship.

Ferenc Sidó defeated Ivan Andreadis in the final, winning three sets to nil to secure the title.

== Results ==
Round of 16
(Hungary) József Kóczián	21	21	18	21
(France) Rene Lanskoy	16	19	21	11
(Czechoslovakia) František Tokár	21	23	15	21	22
(England) Johnny Leach	18	21	21	13	20
(Socialist Federal Republic of Yugoslavia) Vilim Harangozo	21	21	21
(Romania) Toma Reiter	13	14	10
(Czechoslovakia) Ivan Andreadis	21	21	21
(Hungary) Kálmán Szepesi	12	11	9
(Hungary) Ferenc Sidó	21	21	21
(Romania) Mircea Popescu	15	16	14
(France) René Roothooft	22	21	21
(Socialist Federal Republic of Yugoslavia) Žarko Dolinar	20	16	9
(Czechoslovakia) Václav Tereba	21	21	21
(Sweden) Tage Flisberg	11	13	17
(Czechoslovakia) Ladislav Štípek	21	21	7	21
(England) Richard Bergmann	15	18	21	18

Quarterfinals
(Hungary) Kóczián	12	21	28	21	21
(Czechoslovakia) Tokár	21	18	30	12	16
(Socialist Federal Republic of Yugoslavia) Harangozo	18	19	18
(Czechoslovakia) Andreadis	21	21	21
(Hungary) Sidó	12	16	21	21	21
(France) Roothooft	21	21	12	13	15
(Czechoslovakia) Tereba	16	13	21	21	16
(Czechoslovakia) Štípek	21	21	18	11	21

Semifinals
(Hungary) Kóczián	18	16	15
(Czechoslovakia) Andreadis	21	21	21
(Hungary) Sidó	21	21	21
(Czechoslovakia) Štípek	11	18	18

Final
(Czechoslovakia) Andreadis	16	21	18
(Hungary) Sidó	21	23	21

== See also ==
List of World Table Tennis Championships medalists
