= 1955 World Table Tennis Championships – Women's singles =

1955 Women's singles

The 1955 World Table Tennis Championships women's singles was the 22nd edition of the women's singles championship. Angelica Rozeanu defeated Ermelinde Rumpler-Wertl in the final by three sets to nil, to win a sixth consecutive title.

== Results ==
Round of 16
(Romania) Angelica Rozeanu	3
(France) Christiane Watel	0
(England) Rosalind Rowe	21	21	21
(Czechoslovakia) Libuše Grafková	9	17	14
(Japan) Kiiko Watanabe	21	21	21
(England) Jill Rook	9	17	6
(Romania) Sári Szász-Kolozsvári	3
(Wales) Audrey Bates	0
(Romania) Ella Zeller	1
(Austria) Ermelinde Rumpler-Wertl	3
(England) Ann Haydon	21	16	21	24
(Japan) Yoshiko Tanaka	18	21	19	22
(Hungary) Éva Kóczián	3
(Sweden) Birgitta Tegner	1
(England) Diane Rowe	16	21	21	22
(Japan) Fujie Eguchi	21	13	15	20

Quarterfinals
(Romania) Rozeanu	21	16	21	21
(England) Rowe R	15	21	19	12
(Japan) Watanabe	21	21	18	21
(Romania) Szasz	11	16	21	9
(Austria) Rumpler-Wertl	21	13	21	21
(England) Haydon	19	21	10	16
(Hungary) Kóczián	25	17	21	21
(England) Rowe D	23	21	17	13

Semifinals
(Romania) Rozeanu	21	21	21
(Japan) Watanabe	10	11	17
(Austria) Rumpler-Wertl	21	18	13	21	21
(Hungary) Kóczián	15	21	21	11	17

Final
(Romania) Rozeanu	21	21	21
(Austria) Rumpler-Wertl	13	5	8

== See also ==
List of World Table Tennis Championships medalists
