= 1950 World Table Tennis Championships – Women's doubles =

1950 Women's doubles

The 1950 World Table Tennis Championships women's doubles was the 16th edition of the women's doubles championship. Dora Beregi and Helen Elliot defeated Gizi Farkas and Angelica Rozeanu in the final by three sets to one.

== Results ==
Round of 16
(Hungary) Gizi Farkas (Romania) Angelica Rozeanu
(Czechoslovakia) Marie Kettnerová (Czechoslovakia) Ida Koťátková
(England) Elsie Carrington-Weaver (Hungary) Piroska Abraham
(Hungary) Vermesne (Hungary) Anna Schönek
(Czechoslovakia) Květa Hrušková (Czechoslovakia) Eliška Fürstová
(Scotland) Helen Elliot (England) Dora Beregi
(Sweden) Eina Eriksson (Sweden) Jris Persson
(Wales) Nancy Evans-Roy (Wales) Audrey Bates	16	16	19	14	14
(Hungary) Éva Sölyom (Hungary) Eva Marosvölgyi	21	21	21	21	21
(Hungary) Ágnes Simon-Almási (Hungary) Anna Sipos
(France) Huguette Beolet (France) Jeanne Delay
(England) Vera Dace (England) Peggy Franks

Quarterfinals
(Hungary) Farkas (Romania) Rozeanu	3
(Czechoslovakia) Kettnerová (Czechoslovakia) Koťátková	0
(England) Carrington (Hungary) Abraham	11	9	10
(Czechoslovakia) Hrušková (Czechoslovakia) Fürstová	21	21	21
(Scotland) Elliot (England) Beregi	21	21	21
(England) Barnes (England) Crosby	8	18	8
(Sweden) Ljungberg (Sweden) Kristiansson	3	10	9
(England) Dace (England) Franks	21	21	21

Semifinals
(Hungary) Farkas (Romania) Rozeanu	21	21	21
(Czechoslovakia) Hrušková (Czechoslovakia) Fürstová	8	5	5
(Scotland) Elliot (England) Beregi	21	21	21
(England) Dace (England) Franks	19	16	11

Final
(Hungary) Farkas (Romania) Rozeanu	21	10	19	17
(Scotland) Elliot (England) Beregi	13	21	21	21

== See also ==
List of World Table Tennis Championships medalists
