= 1951 World Table Tennis Championships – Men's singles =

1951 Men's singles

The 1951 World Table Tennis Championships men's singles was the 18th edition of the men's singles championship.

Johnny Leach defeated Ivan Andreadis in the final, winning three sets to one to secure the title.

== Results ==
Round of 16
(Hungary) Ferenc Sidó	21	21	21
(Austria) Waldemar Fritsch	13	13	15
(United States) John Somael	21	21	21
(England) Brian Kennedy	8	19	9
(France) Michel Haguenauer	21	21	21
(Netherlands) Willie van Zoelen	14	12	15
(Czechoslovakia) Ivan Andreadis	21	13	21
(Austria) Heribert Just	9	17	13
(Czechoslovakia) Václav Tereba	21	19	21	21
(England) Michael Thornhill	15	21	19	12
(Hungary) József Kóczián	18	21	21	21
(France) Michel Lanskoy	21	6	18	18
(England) Johnny Leach	21	21	21
(United States) Marty Reisman	9	17	17
(France) René Roothooft	11	21	21	21	21
(Sweden) Per Olaf Croneryd	21	23	13	13	14

Quarterfinals
(Hungary) Sidó	22	21	21	21
(United States) Somael	24	9	12	14
(France) Haguenauer	20	14	13
(Czechoslovakia) Andreadis	22	21	21
(Czechoslovakia) Tereba	22	21	22
(Hungary) Kóczián	20	14	20
(England) Leach	17	21	21	24	21
(France) Roothooft	21	14	16	22	19

Semifinals
(Hungary) Sidó	14	19	21	20
(Czechoslovakia) Andreadis	21	21	13	21+
(Czechoslovakia) Tereba	25	9	22	11
(England) Leach	23	21	24	21

Final
(Czechoslovakia) Andreadis	21	18	18	12
(England) Leach	16	21	21	21

+ Time limit rule applied

== See also ==
List of World Table Tennis Championships medalists
