= 1951 World Table Tennis Championships – Women's singles =

1951 Women's singles

The 1951 World Table Tennis Championships women's singles was the 18th edition of the women's singles championship. Angelica Rozeanu defeated Gizi Farkas in the final by three sets to nil, to win the title.

== Results ==
Round of 16
(Romania) Angelica Rozeanu | 21 | 25 | 21
(Scotland) Elisabeth Pithie | 9 | 23 | 18
(Hungary) Rózsi Kárpáti | 19 | 21 | 21 | 8 | 21
(Egypt) Fawi Ka El Shayati | 21 | 19 | 12 | 21 | 16
(Belgium) Joseé Wouters | 21 | 21 | 21
(West Germany) Edith Schmidt | 18 | 13 | 9
(Austria) Gertrude Pritzi | 21 | 21 | 21
(West Germany) Hertha Maier | 5 | 8 | 8
(Romania) Sári Szász-Kolozsvári | 21 | 11 | 15 | 17
(England) Rosalind Rowe | 14 | 21 | 21 | 21
(United States) Leah Neuberger-Thall | 21 | 21 | 21
(Austria) Angela Staffeleitner | 8 | 14 | 15
(Scotland) Helen Elliot | 18 | 15 | 14
(Austria) Ermelinde Wertl | 21 | 21 | 21
(United States) Patricia McLinn | 10 | 11 | 14
(Hungary) Gizi Farkas | 21 | 21 | 21

Quarterfinals
(Romania) Rozeanu | 21 | 21 | 18 | 21
(Hungary) Kárpáti | 6 | 6 | 21 | 11
(Belgium) Wouters | 13 | 13 | 11
(Austria) Pritzi | 21 | 21 | 21
(England) Rowe | 21 | 21 | 16 | 12 | 12
(United States) Neuberger-Thall | 18 | 17 | 21 | 21 | 21
(Austria) Wertl | 18 | 21 | 14 | 21 | 14
(Hungary) Farkas | 21 | 17 | 21 | 19 | 21

Semifinals
(Romania) Rozeanu | 17+ | 14+ | 5+
(Austria) Pritzi | 14+ | 13+ | 4+
(United States) Neuberger-Thall | 14 | 19 | 22
(Hungary) Farkas | 21 | 21 | 24

Final
(Romania) Rozeanu | 21 | 21 | 21
(Hungary) Farkas | 10 | 15 | 13

+ Time limit rule applied

== See also ==
List of World Table Tennis Championships medalists
