= 1950 World Table Tennis Championships – Men's doubles =

1950 Men's doubles

The 1950 World Table Tennis Championships men's doubles was the 17th edition of the men's doubles championship. Ferenc Sidó and Ferenc Soos won the title after defeating Ivan Andreadis and František Tokár in the final by three sets to one.

== Results ==
Round of 16
(Czechoslovakia) Ivan Andreadis (Czechoslovakia) František Tokár	3
(Hungary) Janosik (Hungary) Laszlo Nagy	0
(Hungary) Károly Jávor (Hungary) Jozsef Vagvolgyi	scr
(Hungary) László Várkonyi (Hungary) Kálmán Szepesi	w/o
(England) Ronald Hook (England) Maurice Bergl	0
(Czechoslovakia) Josef Turnovský (Czechoslovakia) Václav Tereba	3
(England) Viktor Barna (England) Richard Bergmann	3
(South Vietnam) Mai Van Chat (South Vietnam) Tran Quang Huy	0
(Czechoslovakia) Bohumil Váňa (Czechoslovakia) Ladislav Štípek	3
(France) Michel Haguenauer (France) Michel Lanskoy	0
(India) Uttam Chandarana (India) Randir Bhandari	3
(Hungary) Elemér Gyetvai (Hungary) Mihaly Foris	0
(Sweden) Weine Fredriksson (Sweden) Sven Cederholm	3
(Hungary) József Szabó (Hungary) Karoly Palfi	1
(Austria) Ferdinand Scheuch (India) Kalyanpur Jayant	0
(Hungary) Ferenc Sidó (Hungary) Ferenc Soos	3

Quarterfinals
(Czechoslovakia) Andreadis (Czechoslovakia) Tokár	3
(Hungary) Jávor (Hungary) Vagvolgyi	0
(Czechoslovakia) Turnovský (Czechoslovakia) Tereba	3
(England) Barna (England) Bergmann	2
(Czechoslovakia) Váňa (Czechoslovakia) Štípek	3
(India) Chandarana (India) Bhandari	0
(Hungary) Szabo (Hungary) Palfi	1
(Hungary) Sidó (Hungary) Soos	3

Semifinals
(Czechoslovakia) Andreadis (Czechoslovakia) Tokár	w/o
(Czechoslovakia) Turnovský (Czechoslovakia) Tereba	scr
(Czechoslovakia) Váňa (Czechoslovakia) Štípek	21	22	16	20	14
(Hungary) Sidó (Hungary) Soos	18	20	21	22	21

Final
(Czechoslovakia) Andreadis (Czechoslovakia) Tokár	21	16	13	18
(Hungary) Sidó (Hungary) Soos	15	21	21	21

== See also ==
- List of World Table Tennis Championships medalists
