= 1950 World Table Tennis Championships – Men's singles =

1950 Men's singles

The 1950 World Table Tennis Championships men's singles was the 17th edition of the men's singles championship.

Richard Bergmann defeated Ferenc Soos in the final, winning three sets to two to secure the title.

== Results ==
Round of 16
(England) Johnny Leach	16	21	21	16	18
(France) Michel Haguenauer	21	16	14	21	21
(Hungary) Ferenc Soos	21	21	21
(Czechoslovakia) Ludvík Vyhnanovský	10	15	15
(Czechoslovakia) Ivan Andreadis	21	21	21	21
(Czechoslovakia) František Tokár	17	15	17	13
(Hungary) Miklós Sebők	21	13	21	21
(Switzerland) Marcel Meyer de St	13	21	13	10
(Hungary) Ferenc Sidó	21	21	22
(Switzerland) Hugo Urchetti	12	11	20
(Czechoslovakia) Václav Tereba	21	21	21
(Czechoslovakia) Ladislav Štípek	11	19	14
(England) Richard Bergmann	21	21	21
(Hungary) Zoltan Farkas	6	8	16
(Czechoslovakia) Bohumil Váňa	21	21	21
(Hungary) Lajos Antel	8	19	11

Quarterfinals
(France) Haguenauer	18	10	11
(Hungary) Soos	21	21	21
(Czechoslovakia) Andreadis	21	21	21
(Hungary) Sebok	14	13	18
(Hungary) Sidó	22	21	21
(Czechoslovakia) Tereba	20	15	14
(England) Bergmann	21	13	19	21	21
(Czechoslovakia) Váňa	14	21	21	19	18

Semifinals
(Hungary) Soos	21	21	20	18	21
(Czechoslovakia) Andreadis	14	19	22	21	14
(Hungary) Sidó	15	18	21	23
(England) Bergmann	21	21	18	25

Final
(Hungary) Soos	21	21	7	14	13
(England) Bergmann	12	16	21	21	21

== See also ==
List of World Table Tennis Championships medalists
