= 1955 World Table Tennis Championships – Women's team =

1955 Corbillon Cup (women's team)

The 1955 World Table Tennis Championships – Corbillon Cup (women's team) was the 15th edition of the women's team championship.

Romania won the gold medal after finishing top of the final group. Japan won the silver medal and England won the bronze medal.

== Medalists ==
Event	Gold	Silver	Bronze
	Romania; Angelica Rozeanu; Sari Szasz; Ella Zeller	Japan; Fujie Eguchi; Shizuki Narahara; Yoshiko Tanaka; Kiiko Watanabe	England; Ann Haydon; Diane Rowe; Rosalind Rowe; Jean Winn

== Final tables ==
=== Group 1 ===
Pos	Team	P	W	L	Pts
1	Romania	6	6	0	6
2	Hungary	6	5	1	5
3	Scotland	6	4	2	4
4	(Socialist Federal Republic of Yugoslavia) Yugoslavia	6	3	3	3
5	Bulgaria	6	2	4	2
6	Denmark	6	1	5	1
7	Belgium	6	0	6	0

=== Group 2 ===
Pos	Team	P	W	L	Pts
1	Japan	6	6	0	6
2	France	6	5	1	5
3	Czechoslovakia	6	4	2	4
4	Netherlands	6	3	3	3
5	Egypt	6	2	4	2
6	(Saar Protectorate) Saarland	6	1	5	1
7	(Republic of Ireland) Ireland	6	0	6	0

=== Group 3 ===
Pos	Team	P	W	L	Pts
1	England	7	7	0	7
2	Austria	7	6	1	6
3	Wales	7	5	2	5
4	United States	7	4	3	4
5	Sweden	7	3	4	3
6	Germany	7	2	5	2
7	Italy	7	1	6	1
8	Switzerland	7	0	7	0

=== Final group ===
Pos	Team	P	W	L	Pts
1	Romania	2	2	0	2
2	Japan	2	1	1	1
3	England	2	0	2	0

== Decisive final group match ==
Romania 3		Japan 2	Score
Rozeanu	bt	Eguchi	21–13 21–16
Rozeanu	bt	Tanaka	21–16 19–21 21–9
Zeller	lost to	Eguchi	19–21 7–21
Zeller	bt	Tanaka	14–21 21–16 22–20
Rozeanu & Zeller	lost to	Eguchi & Watanabe	19–21 13–21

== See also ==
List of World Table Tennis Championships medalists
