= Slăvescu =

Slăvescu is a surname. Notable people with the surname include:

- Luci Slavescu, Romanian table tennis player
- Victor Slăvescu (1891–1977), Romanian economist and politician
