= Jean-Claude Sala =

French table tennis player

Personal information
- Nationality: France
Medal record
Representing France
World Table Tennis Championships
| Bronze medal – third place | 1953 | Men's team |

Jean-Claude Sala is a former male French international table tennis player.

He won a bronze medal at the 1953 World Table Tennis Championships in the Swaythling Cup (men's team event) with Guy Amouretti, Michel Haguenauer, Michel Lanskoy and René Roothooft.

He was a twice French National doubles champion in 1954 and 1955 with Stephen Cafiero.

== See also ==
- List of table tennis players
- List of World Table Tennis Championships medalists
