= Miklós Sebők =

Hungarian table tennis player

Personal information
- Nationality: Hungary
- Born: 23 February 1923 Budapest
- Died: 1986 (aged 62–63)
Medal record
Representing Hungary
World Table Tennis Championships
Silver medal – second place	1953	Men's team

Miklós Sebők (1923-1986), was a former male international table tennis player from Hungary.

He won a silver medal at the 1953 World Table Tennis Championships in the Swaythling Cup (men's team event) with Elemér Gyetvai, József Kóczián, Ferenc Sidó and Kálmán Szepesi.

== See also ==
- List of table tennis players
- List of World Table Tennis Championships medalists
