= Gertrude Wutzl =

Austrian table tennis player

Personal information
- Nationality: Austria
Medal record
Representing Austria
World Table Tennis Championships
Silver medal – second place	1951	Women's team

Gertrude Wutzl is an Austrian former international table tennis player.

She won a silver medal at the 1951 World Table Tennis Championships in the Corbillon Cup with Gertrude Pritzi and Ermelinde Wertl for Austria.

== See also ==
- List of table tennis players
- List of World Table Tennis Championships medalists
