= Josef Somogyi =

Hungarian table tennis player

Personal information
- Nationality: Hungary
- Died: 12 January 1965
Medal record
Representing Hungary
World Table Tennis Championships
Bronze medal – third place	1955	Men's Team

Josef 'Joe' Somogyi was a male international table tennis player from Hungary.

== Table tennis career ==
He won the Doubles [Gold] with Tibor Hámori at the Summer University World Championship (Budapest, July 31 - August 8, 1954] and was runner up in the Singles Gold at the same event. http://mefsarchivum.hu/!/esemenynaptar/3-nemzetkozi-sport/362-nyari-egyetemi-vilagbajnoksag-1954

He won a bronze medal as part of the Hungarian team that competed in the Swaythling Cup during the 1955 World Table Tennis Championships. The team consisted of László Földy, József Kóczián, Ferenc Sidó and Kálmán Szepesi.

He helped Surrey win the National County Championships in the 1958–59 season and was runner-up in the English Open.

== Personal life ==
He escaped Hungary with his wife Ary during the Hungarian Revolution of 1956 to London becoming an architect-draughtsman. He was killed in a car accident on 12 January 1965.

He leaves behind two daughters, Susanna and Juliette.

Susanna was born in Budapest and could not escape with her parents in 1956 (as a baby) but, joined them later in 1962 when she was finally "allowed" out of Hungary to join her parents in the United Kingdom.

Susanna is writing a book about Josef Somogyi, encapsulating his table tennis career and, escape from the Hungarian Revolution of 1956.

== See also ==
- List of table tennis players
- List of World Table Tennis Championships medalists
