= Bryan Merrett =

British table tennis player

Personal information
- Nationality: England
- Born: 1 November 1934 Gloucester, England
- Died: August 2001 (aged 66) Gloucester, England
Medal record
Representing England
World Table Tennis Championships
Bronze medal – third place	1955	Men's Team

Bryan Reginald Merrett was a male international table tennis player from England.

== Table tennis career ==
He won a bronze medal at the 1955 World Table Tennis Championships in the Swaythling Cup (men's team event) with Richard Bergmann, Brian Kennedy, Johnny Leach and Alan Rhodes and for England.

He was a former England No 1, played in 100 internationals and won the Welsh Open in Cardiff in 1952. He won two English National Table Tennis Championships titles in singles and doubles.

== Personal life ==
He married Shirley Hotchkins in 1957 and they spent their honeymoon on a Russian table tennis tour. He died in August 2001 aged 66.

== See also ==
- List of England players at the World Team Table Tennis Championships
- List of World Table Tennis Championships medalists
