= Bernard Crouch =

English tennis and table tennis player

Personal information
- Nationality: England
- Born: 1925
- Died: 2 December 1955 (aged 29–30) Barnes, London, England
Medal record
Representing England
World Table Tennis Championships
Bronze medal – third place	1950	Men's Team

Bernard Crouch (1925 – 2 December 1955), was a male international table tennis and tennis player from England.

== Table tennis career ==
Crouch won a bronze medal at the 1950 World Table Tennis Championships in the Swaythling Cup (men's team) event with Richard Bergmann, Johnny Leach, Aubrey Simons and Harry Venner for England.

He won the Wilmott Cup for the Staines League in 1954/55 and was also on the Middlesex County Championships winning side in 1947–48 and 1949–50 to 1955.

== Tennis career ==
Crouch was an excellent tennis player and a regular member of the Surrey County side. He was a finalist at the Middlesex Championships in 1948. He also played at Wimbledon on several occasions from 1950 to 1954.

== Death ==
Crouch died in the 1955 Barnes railway accident.

== See also ==
- List of England players at the World Team Table Tennis Championships
- List of World Table Tennis Championships medalists
