= Barnes rail crash =

1955 rail crash in west London, England

Coordinates: 51°27′59″N 0°14′19″W

Details
- Date: 2 December 1955; 23:28
- Location: Barnes railway station, London
- Country: England
- Line: Waterloo to Reading line
- Operator: British Railways
- Service: Passenger train and freight train
- Incident type: Collision
- Cause: Signalling error

Statistics
- Trains: 2
- Passengers: ~35
- Deaths: 13
- Injured: 41 (Note: The official report states that the train had "30–40" passengers, although the passenger casualty figures (11 dead, 20 seriously injured, 21 suffering "minor injuries and shock") add up to 52.)
Location within Greater London

The Barnes rail crash, in which 13 people were killed and 41 were injured, occurred at Barnes railway station late in the evening of Friday 2 December 1955.

== Events ==
The Southern Region of British Railways 23:12 electric passenger train travelling from London Waterloo to Windsor & Eton Riverside and Chertsey collided with the rear of a LMS class 8 2-8-0 hauled freight train from Herne Hill to Brent at about 35 mph. The wreckage from the passenger train short-circuited the third rail; electrical arcing started a fire in the wooden coach frames, and the leading coach of the passenger train was burnt out. The coaches were classified as 2-NOL and were converted in the 1930s from old London & South Western Railway steam carriages.

== Causes ==
=== Signalling ===
The accident was caused by irregular operation of the block apparatus by the signalman at Barnes Junction. The signals were interlocked so that they could not be freed to show clear unless the block ahead was clear. A manual release key could be used to circumvent this interlocking if, for example, a broken mechanical link or track circuit gave a false indication of a train on the line. The signalman for Point Pleasant, the block behind Barnes, offered the passenger train forward improperly, without waiting for the "Train out of section" acknowledgement from Barnes. The Barnes signalman had forgotten about the freight train and used his release key to clear the signals.

=== Electrical ===
A contributory factor was the failure of the circuit breakers supplying the traction current to the section to trip when the collision occurred – the subsequent arcing and fire caused most of the fatalities. The official report concluded that the current drawn by the short-circuit (approx 5700 A) was only slightly higher than the trip current (5000 A), and the breakers failed to trip due to poor response speed and stiffness of operation.

== Casualties ==
One of the passengers killed was Bernard Crouch, an England table tennis international and world championship medallist.
