= Alan Rhodes (table tennis) =

British table tennis player

Personal information
- Nationality: England
Medal record
Representing England
World Table Tennis Championships
Bronze medal – third place	1955	Men's Team

Alan Rhodes is a male former international table tennis player from England.

He won a bronze medal at the 1955 World Table Tennis Championships in the Swaythling Cup (men's team event) with Richard Bergmann, Brian Kennedy, Johnny Leach and Bryan Merrett for England.

He represented his county Middlesex.

== See also ==
- List of England players at the World Team Table Tennis Championships
- List of World Table Tennis Championships medalists
