= Josip Gabrić =

Yugoslav table tennis player (1930–2014)

Personal information
- Born: 7 August 1930 Subotica, Kingdom of Yugoslavia
- Died: 30 July 2014 (aged 83)

Sport
- Sport: Table tennis
Medal record
Representing Yugoslavia
World Table Tennis Championships
| Bronze medal – third place | 1951 | Men's Team |

Josip Gabrić (7 August 1930 – 30 July 2014) was an international table tennis player who competed for SFR Yugoslavia.

Gabrić won a bronze medal in the Swaythling Cup (men's team event) at the 1951 World Table Tennis Championships.

Gabrić died on 30 July 2014, at the age of 83.

== See also ==
- List of table tennis players
- List of World Table Tennis Championships medalists
