= Zdenko Uzorinac =

Croatian table tennis player

Personal information
- Nicknames: Uzor, Braco
- Born: 7 July 1929 Zagreb, Kingdom of Yugoslavia
- Died: 10 June 2005 (aged 75) Zagreb, Croatia

Sport
- Sport: Table tennis
- Club: Mladost
- Playing style: defence
Medal record
Men's table tennis
Representing Yugoslavia
World Championships
Bronze medal – third place	1951 Vienna	Team

Zdenko Uzorinac (7 July 1929 – 10 June 2005) was a Croatian and Yugoslav international table tennis player, coach, sports journalist and writer.

Uzorinac competed for Yugoslavia at four World Table Tennis Championships, winning a bronze medal in the Swaythling Cup (men's team event) at the 1951 World Table Tennis Championships.

== Sources ==
- The Legend Retires
- Umro Zdenko Uzorinac (in Croatian)
- From 1965 Uzorinac coached ASTK Mladost Zagreb and in the three year period the club won three national club titles(in Croatian and English)

== See also ==
- List of table tennis players
- List of World Table Tennis Championships medalists
