= Stephen Cafiero =

French table tennis player

Personal information
- Nationality: France
- Born: 1920
- Died: 2000 (aged 79–80)
Medal record
Representing France
World Table Tennis Championships
| Bronze medal – third place | 1955 | Men's Singles |

Stephen Cafiero was a male French international table tennis player.

He won bronze medal at the 1955 World Table Tennis Championships in the men's singles.

He was a three times French National doubles champion in 1954 and 1955 with Jean-Claude Sala and in 1960 with Jacques Gambier.

== See also ==
- List of table tennis players
- List of World Table Tennis Championships medalists
