= Jean Winn =

English table tennis player (1930–2024)

Personal information
- Nationality: England
- Born: 17 June 1930 Merton, Surrey, England
- Died: 2 September 2024 (aged 94)
Medal record
Representing England
World Table Tennis Championships
Bronze medal – third place	1955	Women's Team

Jean I. P. Winn (17 June 1930 – 2 September 2024) was an English international table tennis player.

Winn won a bronze medal at the 1955 World Table Tennis Championships in the Corbillon Cup (women's team event) with Ann Haydon, Diane Rowe and Rosalind Rowe for England.

Winn was born in Merton, Surrey on 17 June 1930. She married fellow table tennis player Jackie Head in 1955. Winn died on 2 September 2024, at the age of 94.

== See also ==
- List of England players at the World Team Table Tennis Championships
- List of World Table Tennis Championships medalists
