= Paraschiva Patulea =

Romanian table tennis player

Personal information
- Nationality: Romania
Medal record
Representing Romania
World Table Tennis Championships
Gold medal – first place	1951	team

Paraschiva Patulea was a female former international table tennis player from Romania.

== Table tennis career ==
She won a gold medal in the team event at the 1951 World Table Tennis Championships.

== See also ==
- List of table tennis players
- List of World Table Tennis Championships medalists
