= Sally Prouty =

American table tennis player

Sally Prouty (born Sarah Green; December 23, 1922 – September 7, 2014) was an American table tennis champion. She was inducted into the United States of America Table Tennis (USATT) Hall of Fame in 1979.

== Childhood ==
A reportedly frail child, Prouty had already undergone abdominal surgery and a cranial operation by the age of eight. She took up swimming for therapeutic purposes when she was 11 years old, and in the years that followed she won a number of medals and trophies for her swimming accomplishments.

== Table tennis ==
Prouty began playing table tennis when her family moved from St. Louis to Indianapolis. Her father installed a tennis table in the basement and initially Prouty played to loosen up her back, which she had sprained while diving. One year later, Prouty entered a tournament play at the Hoosier Athletic Club. Only two years later, at the same location, she would win the national women's title. In the meantime, Prouty quickly won three table tennis tournaments in the 1936-1937 season: the Indiana State Championship at Kokomo on December 19 and 20, the Northern Indiana Open at Huntingdon on February 6 and 7, and the Missouri Valley Open at Kansas City on February 13 and 14.

In 1938, at 14 years old, Prouty was invited to play in the World Championships in London, but declined due to school work and piano practice. Prouty went on to win five consecutive United States women's singles table tennis championships from 1940 to 1944.
