= Friederike Lauber =

Austrian table tennis player

Personal information
- Nationality: Austria
- Born: 1937 Mürzzuschlag
- Died: 6 December 1996 (aged 58–59)
Medal record
Representing Austria
World Table Tennis Championships
Bronze medal – third place	1951	Women's team

Friederike Lauber (married name Scharfegger) 1937–1996, was an Austrian international table tennis player.

She won a bronze medal at the 1953 World Table Tennis Championships in the Corbillon Cup with Gertrude Pritzi and Ermelinde Wertl for Austria.

She was Austrian champion in 1960 and 1961.

== See also ==
- List of table tennis players
- List of World Table Tennis Championships medalists
