= Ilona Király =

Hungarian table tennis player

Personal information
- Nationality: Hungary
- Born: 1914
- Died: 1979 (aged 64–65)
Medal record
Representing Hungary
World Table Tennis Championships
Silver medal – second place	1950	Women's Team

Ilona Király (1914-1979), was a female international table tennis player from Hungary.

== Table tennis career ==
She won a silver medal in the 1950 World Table Tennis Championships in the Corbillon Cup (women's team event) with Gizi Farkas, Rozsi Karpati and Ilona Sólyom for Hungary.

She won the Hungarian National singles in 1936 and the doubles five times; 1944, 1948, 1949, 1951 and 1952 (with Gizi Farkas). She died in 1979.

== See also ==
- List of table tennis players
- List of World Table Tennis Championships medalists
