= Josip Vogrinc =

Yugoslav table tennis player

Personal information
- Nationality: Yugoslavia
- Born: 1924 or 1925
- Died: 1988
Medal record
Representing Yugoslavia
World Table Tennis Championships
Bronze medal – third place	1951	Men's Team

Josip Vogrinc is a former international table tennis player from Yugoslavia.

He won a bronze medal in the Swaythling Cup (men's team event) at the 1951 World Table Tennis Championships.

== See also ==
- List of table tennis players
- List of World Table Tennis Championships medalists
