= Peggy Ichkoff =

American table tennis player

Personal information
- Nationality: United States
Medal record
Representing United States
World Table Tennis Championships
Bronze medal – third place	1951	Doubles

Pauline "Peggy" Ichkoff (née Widimier), is an American former international table tennis player.

== Table tennis career ==
She won a bronze medal at the 1951 World Table Tennis Championships in the women's doubles with Leah Thall-Neuberger.

== Hall of Fame ==
She was inducted into the USA Hall of Fame in 1987.

== Personal life ==
She married Dick Ichkoff.

== See also ==
- List of table tennis players
- List of World Table Tennis Championships medalists
