= László Várkonyi =

Hungarian table tennis player

Personal information
- Nationality: Hungary
- Born: 1 April 1909 Budapest
- Died: 1 March 1972 (aged 62) Budapest
Medal record
Representing Hungary
World Table Tennis Championships
Gold medal – first place	1949	Men's team
Silver medal – second place	1950	Men's team
Gold medal – first place	1952	Men's team

László Várkonyi (1909 – 1972) was a Hungarian international table tennis player.

== Table tennis career ==
He won three medals at the World Table Tennis Championships from 1949 to 1952.

The three World Championship medals included two gold medal in the team event.

He was nicknamed Laci.

== See also ==
- List of table tennis players
- List of World Table Tennis Championships medalists
