= Audrey Coombs =

Welsh table tennis player

Audrey Coombs (Jones)
Personal information
- Nationality: Wales
- Born: 1928 Neath
- Died: 20 September 2016 (aged 87–88)
Medal record
Representing Wales
World Table Tennis Championships
Bronze medal – third place	1951	Women's Team

Audrey Marguerite Coombs (married name Jones), (1928–2016), was a female Welsh international table tennis player.

== Table tennis career ==
She won a bronze medal in the 1951 World Table Tennis Championships in the Corbillon Cup (women's team event) with Audrey Bates and Betty Gray for Wales.

== Personal life ==
She married Garfield 'Gron' Jones in 1951.

== See also ==
- List of table tennis players
- List of World Table Tennis Championships medalists
