= Ida Koťátková =

Czech table tennis player

Personal information
- Nationality: Czechoslovakia
Medal record
Representing Czechoslovakia
World Table Tennis Championships
Bronze medal – third place	1949	Women's doubles
Bronze medal – third place	1950	Women's team

Ida Koťátková was an international table tennis player from Czechoslovakia.

Koťátková won two bronze medals at the World Table Tennis Championships.

Koťátková's first bronze medal came in the women's doubles with Eliška Fürstová at the 1949 World Table Tennis Championships.

Koťátková's second medal came in the Corbillon Cup (women's team event) at the 1950 World Table Tennis Championships.

== See also ==
- List of table tennis players
- List of World Table Tennis Championships medalists
