= Leah Neuberger =

American table tennis player

Leah Thall-Neuberger

Personal information
- Nationality: United States
- Born: 17 December 1915
- Died: 25 January 1993 (aged 77)
Medal record
Representing United States
World Table Tennis Championships
Bronze medal – third place	1947	Team
Bronze medal – third place	1947	Doubles
Bronze medal – third place	1948	Doubles
Bronze medal – third place	1951	Singles
Bronze medal – third place	1951	Doubles
Gold medal – first place	1956	Mixed Doubles

Leah Thall-Neuberger (December 17, 1915 in Columbus, Ohio – January 25, 1993), nicknamed Miss Ping, was an American table tennis player. She was ranked the # 3 table tennis player in the world in 1951.

== Table tennis career ==
Her six World Championship medals included a gold medal in the mixed doubles at the 1956 World Table Tennis Championships with Erwin Klein. Her partners for the three bronze medals in the doubles were Davida Hawthorn, Thelma Thall and Peggy Ichkoff respectively.

Neuberger won the United States national championships nine times as a single player, twelve times in doubles, and eight times in mixed doubles. She also won 41 times at the Canadian championships. She served on the Canadian team that travelled to the People’s Republic of China in 1971 on the Ping-Pong Diplomacy Tour. She also won two English Open titles.

Neuberger competed at the 1969 Maccabiah Games in Israel.

== Halls of Fame ==
Neuberger, who was Jewish, was inducted into the International Jewish Sports Hall of Fame in 1999. She was also a member of the US Table Tennis Hall of Fame.

== See also ==
- List of select Jewish table tennis players
- List of table tennis players
- List of World Table Tennis Championships medalists
