= Joyce Roberts =

British table tennis player

Personal information
- Nationality: England
Medal record
Representing England
World Table Tennis Championships
Bronze medal – third place	1951	Women's Team

Joyce Roberts (married name Joyce Miller), is a female English former international table tennis player.

== Table tennis career ==
She won a bronze medal in the 1951 World Table Tennis Championships in the Corbillon Cup (women's team event) with Peggy Franks, Diane Rowe and Rosalind Rowe for England.

== Personal life ==
In September 1949 she married English table tennis player Anthony 'Tony' Miller.

== See also ==
- List of England players at the World Team Table Tennis Championships
- List of World Table Tennis Championships medalists
