= József Farkas (table tennis) =

Hungarian table tennis player

Personal information
- Nationality: Hungary
Medal record
Representing Hungary
World Table Tennis Championships
Silver medal – second place	1950	Men's team
Silver medal – second place	1951	Men's team

József Farkas was a male Hungarian international table tennis player.

He won two silver medals at the 1950 World Table Tennis Championships and 1951 World Table Tennis Championships in the men's team events.

== See also ==
- List of table tennis players
- List of World Table Tennis Championships medalists
