= Ferenc Soos =

Hungarian table tennis player

Personal information
- Full name: Soos Ferenc
- Nationality: Hungary
- Born: 10 June 1919 Újpest, Hungary
- Died: 5 February 1981 (aged 61) Budapest, Hungary

Sport
- Sport: Table tennis
Medal record
Men's table tennis
Representing Hungary
World Championships
Silver medal – second place	1950 Budapest	Singles
Gold medal – first place	1950 Budapest	Doubles
Silver medal – second place	1950 Budapest	Team
Bronze medal – third place	1949 Stockholm	Singles
Gold medal – first place	1949 Stockholm	Team
Silver medal – second place	1948 Wembley	Doubles
Gold medal – first place	1947 Paris	Mixed
Gold medal – first place	1938 Wembley	Team
Silver medal – second place	1937 Baden	Team
Bronze medal – third place	1936 Prague	Singles
Bronze medal – third place	1936 Prague	Doubles
Bronze medal – third place	1936 Prague	Team

Ferenc Soos was a male former international table tennis player from Hungary.

== Table tennis career ==
He won twelve medals in singles, doubles, and team events in the World Table Tennis Championships in 1936 to 1950.

The twelve World Championship medals included four gold medals; two in the team event, one in the mixed doubles at the 1947 World Table Tennis Championships with Gizi Farkas and one in the men's doubles at the 1950 World Table Tennis Championships with Ferenc Sidó.

== See also ==
- List of table tennis players
- List of World Table Tennis Championships medalists
