= Zsuzsa Fantusz =

Hungarian table tennis player

Personal information
- Nationality: Hungary Australia
- Born: 28 December 1933 (age 92) Budapest
Medal record
Representing Hungary
World Table Tennis Championships
Bronze medal – third place	1953	Women's doubles
Bronze medal – third place	1953	Women's team

Zsuzsanna 'Zsuzsa' Fantusz (married name Javor) was a female Hungarian international table tennis player.

== Table tennis career ==
She won double bronze at the 1953 World Table Tennis Championships in the women's doubles with Edit Sági and the women's team.

== Personal life ==
She emigrated to Australia after 1956 and was inaugurated into the Australian Hall of Fame.

== See also ==
- List of table tennis players
- List of World Table Tennis Championships medalists
