= Betty Gray =

Welsh table tennis player

Personal information
- Nationality: Wales
- Born: 20 August 1920 Resolven, Neath
- Died: 12 August 2018 (aged 97)
Medal record
Representing Wales
World Table Tennis Championships
Bronze medal – third place	1951	Women's Team

Betty Gray (1920–2018) was a female Welsh international table tennis player.

== Table tennis career ==
She started playing at the age of 19 in 1939 at the Young Conservatives' Club, Swansea. She learnt the art of playing the tennis herself during the World War II.

She won a bronze medal in the 1951 World Table Tennis Championships in the Corbillon Cup (women's team event) with Audrey Bates and Audrey Coombs for Wales.

She played more than 250 times for Wales and for 25 consecutive years she won the Swansea and District Championship Cup.

== Awards ==
She received an MBE and in 2012 was chosen to be a torch bearer when the 2012 Olympic Torch toured Swansea.

== Later life ==
Betty was the President of the Welsh Table Tennis Association. She died at age 96 in 2018.

== See also ==
- List of table tennis players
- List of World Table Tennis Championships medalists
