= Audrey Bates =

Welsh athlete (1922-2001)

Personal information
- Nationality: Wales
- Born: 4 April 1922 Cardiff, Wales
- Died: 21 November 2001 (aged 79) Cardiff, Wales

Sport
- Sport: table tennis, tennis, squash and lacrosse
Medal record
Representing Wales
World Table Tennis Championships
Bronze medal – third place	1951	Women's Team

Audrey Glenys Bates (4 April 1922 – 21 November 2001) was a Welsh international athlete in four sports for Wales: table tennis, tennis, squash and lacrosse. She as inducted into the Welsh Sports Hall of Fame posthumously in 2002.

== Biography ==
Bates was born in Cardiff, the daughter of Charlie Bates. She had twin sister, Barbara, and two other sisters; their father was an accountant and amateur golfer. She was educated at Howell's School, Llandaff, and was later the school's games coach. During World War II she worked at an ordnance factory in Llanishen. She retired from school work in 1982. She died in 2001, at the age of 79, in Cardiff.

== Sports career ==
In addition to competing in table tennis, squash, and tennis, she was an active player of lacrosse, golf, and field hockey. She was president of the Welsh Lacrosse Association. She was awarded the Queen's Jubilee Medal in 1977, "for services to sport". Bates was posthumously inducted into the Welsh Sports Hall of Fame in 2002.

=== Table tennis ===
Bates won a bronze medal in the 1951 World Table Tennis Championships in the Corbillon Cup (women's team event) with Audrey Coombs and Betty Gray for Wales.

=== Squash ===
She was an international squash player and competed in the British Open Squash Championships as a seeded player. She played for Wales between 1947 and 1965.

=== Tennis ===
She first played tennis at the Radyr club age just 9, before joining the Whitchurch and Cardiff Lawn Tennis Club. Audrey played at Wimbledon in the singles and doubles and was a member of the Welsh lawn tennis team from 1947 to 1954.

== See also ==
- List of table tennis players
- List of World Table Tennis Championships medalists
