= Michel Lanskoy =

French table tennis player

Personal information
- Nationality: France
Medal record
Representing France
World Table Tennis Championships
Bronze medal – third place	1947	Men's team
Bronze medal – third place	1950	Men's team
Bronze medal – third place	1953	Men's team

Michel Lanskoy is a French former international table tennis player.

Lanskoy won a bronze medal at the 1947 World Table Tennis Championships in the Swaythling Cup (men's team event). He won two more bronze medals at the 1950 World Table Tennis Championships and the 1953 World Table Tennis Championships in the Swaythling Cup.

Lanskoy was a five-time French National doubles champion in 1950, 1951, 1953, 1956 and 1958.

== See also ==
- List of table tennis players
- List of World Table Tennis Championships medalists
