= Éva Kóczián =

Hungarian table tennis player

Personal information
- Full name: FÖLDY-KÓCZIÁN Éva
- Nationality: Hungary
- Born: 25 May 1936 (age 90) Budapest, Hungary

Sport
- Sport: Table tennis
Medal record
Women's table tennis
Representing Hungary
World Championships
Bronze medal – third place	1967 Stockholm	Doubles
Bronze medal – third place	1967 Stockholm	Team
Bronze medal – third place	1963 Prague	Mixed Doubles
Bronze medal – third place	1963 Prague	Team
Silver medal – second place	1961 Beijing	Singles
Bronze medal – third place	1959 Dortmund	Singles
Bronze medal – third place	1955 Utrecht	Singles
Gold medal – first place	1955 Utrecht	Mixed Doubles
Bronze medal – third place	1954 Wembley	Singles
Silver medal – second place	1954 Wembley	Team
Bronze medal – third place	1953 Bucharest	Mixed Doubles
Bronze medal – third place	1953 Bucharest	Team
European Championships
Bronze medal – third place	1966 London	Singles
Gold medal – first place	1966 London	Doubles
Gold medal – first place	1966 London	Team
Gold medal – first place	1964 Malmo	Singles
Silver medal – second place	1964 Malmo	Team
Gold medal – first place	1960 Zagreb	Singles
Silver medal – second place	1960 Zagreb	Doubles
Gold medal – first place	1960 Zagreb	Team
Gold medal – first place	1958 Budapest	Singles
Silver medal – second place	1958 Budapest	Doubles
Silver medal – second place	1958 Budapest	Mixed Doubles

Éva Kóczián, later Kóczián-Földy (born 25 May 1936 in Budapest) is a former female international table tennis player from Hungary.

== Table tennis career ==
She won twelve medals in singles, doubles, and team events in the World Table Tennis Championships and in the Table Tennis European Championships.

The twelve World Championship medals included a gold medal in the mixed doubles at the 1955 World Table Tennis Championships with Kálmán Szepesi.

She also won four English Open titles.

== Personal life ==
Her brother József Kóczián was also a table tennis player. She married fellow table tennis international László Földy.

== See also ==
- List of table tennis players
- List of World Table Tennis Championships medalists
