= Edit Sági =

Hungarian table tennis player

Personal information
- Nationality: Hungary
Medal record
Representing Hungary
World Table Tennis Championships
| Bronze medal – third place | 1952 | Women's doubles |
| Bronze medal – third place | 1953 | Women's doubles |

Edit Sági was a female Hungarian international table tennis player.

== Table tennis career ==
She won a bronze medal at the 1952 World Table Tennis Championships in the women's doubles with Gizi Farkas and the following year won another bronze in the women's doubles with Zsuzsa Fantusz.

== See also ==
- List of table tennis players
- List of World Table Tennis Championships medalists
