= Květa Hrušková =

Czech table tennis player

Personal information
- Nationality: Czech Republic
- Born: 25 June 1925
- Died: 30 January 2012 (aged 86)
Medal record
Representing Czechoslovakia
World Table Tennis Championships
| Silver medal – second place | 1949 | Women's Singles |
| Silver medal – second place | 1949 | Mixed Doubles |
| Bronze medal – third place | 1950 | Women's Team |
| Bronze medal – third place | 1950 | Women's Doubles |
| Bronze medal – third place | 1950 | Mixed Doubles |

Květa Hrušková (25 June 1925 – 30 January 2012) was a female Czech international table tennis player.

She won five World Table Tennis Championship medals during the 1949 World Table Tennis Championships and 1951 World Table Tennis Championships.

== See also ==
- List of table tennis players
- List of World Table Tennis Championships medalists
