= Aubrey Simons =

English table tennis player

Personal information
- Nationality: England
- Born: 1921
- Died: 14 March 2014 (aged 92–93)
Medal record
Representing England
World Table Tennis Championships
Bronze medal – third place	1949	Men's Team
Bronze medal – third place	1950	Men's Team
Silver medal – second place	1952	Men's Team
Gold medal – first place	1953	Men's Team
Bronze medal – third place	1954	Men's Team
Silver medal – second place	1955	Mixed Doubles

Aubrey Simons (1921 – 14 March 2014) was a male former international table tennis player from England.

He won a gold medal at the 1953 World Table Tennis Championships in the Swaythling Cup (men's team) event with Richard Bergmann, Adrian Haydon, Johnny Leach and Brian Kennedy for England.

In addition he won another five medals at the World Table Tennis Championships including a mixed doubles silver medal with Helen Elliot at the 1955 World Table Tennis Championships.

He also won two English Open titles.

He died in 2014.

== See also ==
- List of table tennis players
- List of World Table Tennis Championships medalists
- List of England players at the World Team Table Tennis Championships
