= Eliška Fürstová =

Czech table tennis player (born 1927)

Eliška Fürstová (Krejčová)
Personal information
- Nationality: Czechoslovakia
- Born: 11 September 1927 (age 99)
Medal record
Representing Czechoslovakia
World Table Tennis Championships
Bronze medal – third place	1947	Women's team
Bronze medal – third place	1948	Women's team
Bronze medal – third place	1949	Women's team
Bronze medal – third place	1950	Women's doubles
Bronze medal – third place	1950	Mixed doubles
Bronze medal – third place	1950	Women's doubles
Bronze medal – third place	1955	Mixed doubles

Eliška Fürstová (later Krejčová; born 11 September 1927) is a former international table tennis player from Czechoslovakia.{{dead link|date=October 2026

Fürstová won seven bronze medals at the World Table Tennis Championships.

Her first two bronze medals came in the team events in 1947 and 1948. The following year she won a third bronze with Ida Koťátková in the women's doubles at the 1949 World Table Tennis Championships. In 1950 she won three more medals in the Corbillon Cup (team event), the doubles with Kveta Hrusakova and the mixed doubles with Ivan Andreadis.

Her final medal came in 1955 in the mixed doubles with Ladislav Štípek when she played under her married name of Krejčová. She won 14 European titles and 17 national titles.

== See also ==
- List of table tennis players
- List of World Table Tennis Championships medalists
