= Rozsi Karpati =

Hungarian table tennis player

Personal information
- Nationality: Hungary
Medal record
Representing Hungary
World Table Tennis Championships
Silver medal – second place	1947	Women's team
Silver medal – second place	1948	Women's team
Bronze medal – third place	1949	Women's team
Bronze medal – third place	1949	Women's doubles
Silver medal – second place	1950	Women's team
Bronze medal – third place	1950	Women's singles
Bronze medal – third place	1951	Women's team
Bronze medal – third place	1951	Women's singles

Rozsi Karpati was a female Hungarian international table tennis player.

She won eight World Table Tennis Championship medals from the 1947 World Table Tennis Championships to the 1951 World Table Tennis Championships.

== See also ==
- List of table tennis players
- List of World Table Tennis Championships medalists
