= René Roothooft =

French table tennis player

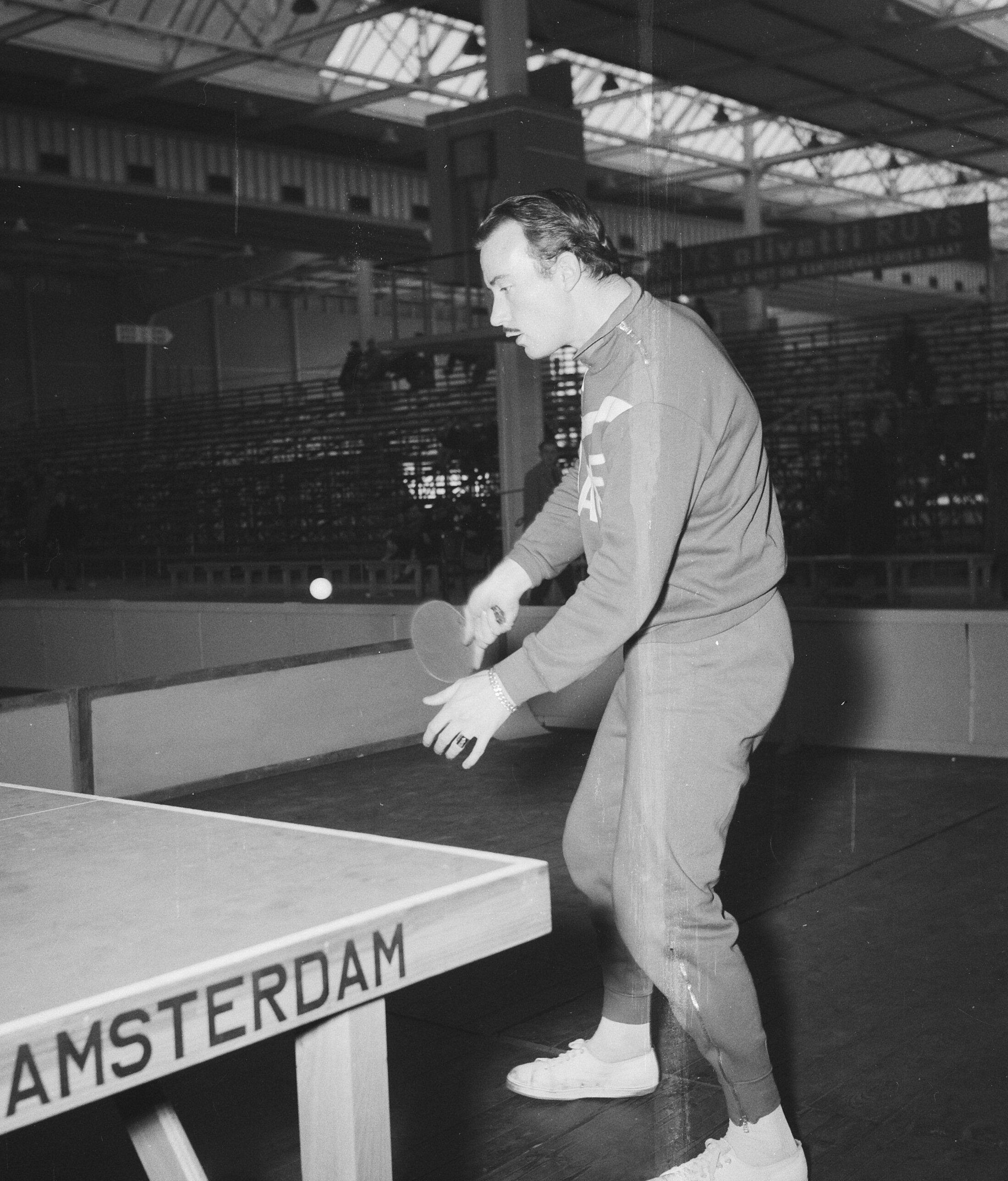

Personal information
- Nationality: France
Medal record
Representing France
World Table Tennis Championships
Bronze medal – third place	1950	Men's Team
Bronze medal – third place	1952	Men's Singles
Bronze medal – third place	1953	Men's Team

René Roothooft is a former male French international table tennis player.

He won a bronze medal at the 1950 World Table Tennis Championships in the men's team event. Two years later he won another bronze at the 1952 World Table Tennis Championships in the men's singles. His third bronze came in 1953 at the 1953 World Table Tennis Championships in the men's team event.

In the National French Championships, he won 14 titles: in singles in 1951, 1952 and 1956, in doubles in 1949 with Charles Dubouillé, 1951, 1953, 1956 and 1958 with Michel Lanskoy and mixed 1953–1956 with Christiane Watel and 1958 and 1959 with Claude Rougagnou. He reached a career high world ranking of four.

== See also ==
- List of table tennis players
- List of World Table Tennis Championships medalists
