= Vilim Harangozo =

Serbian table tennis player

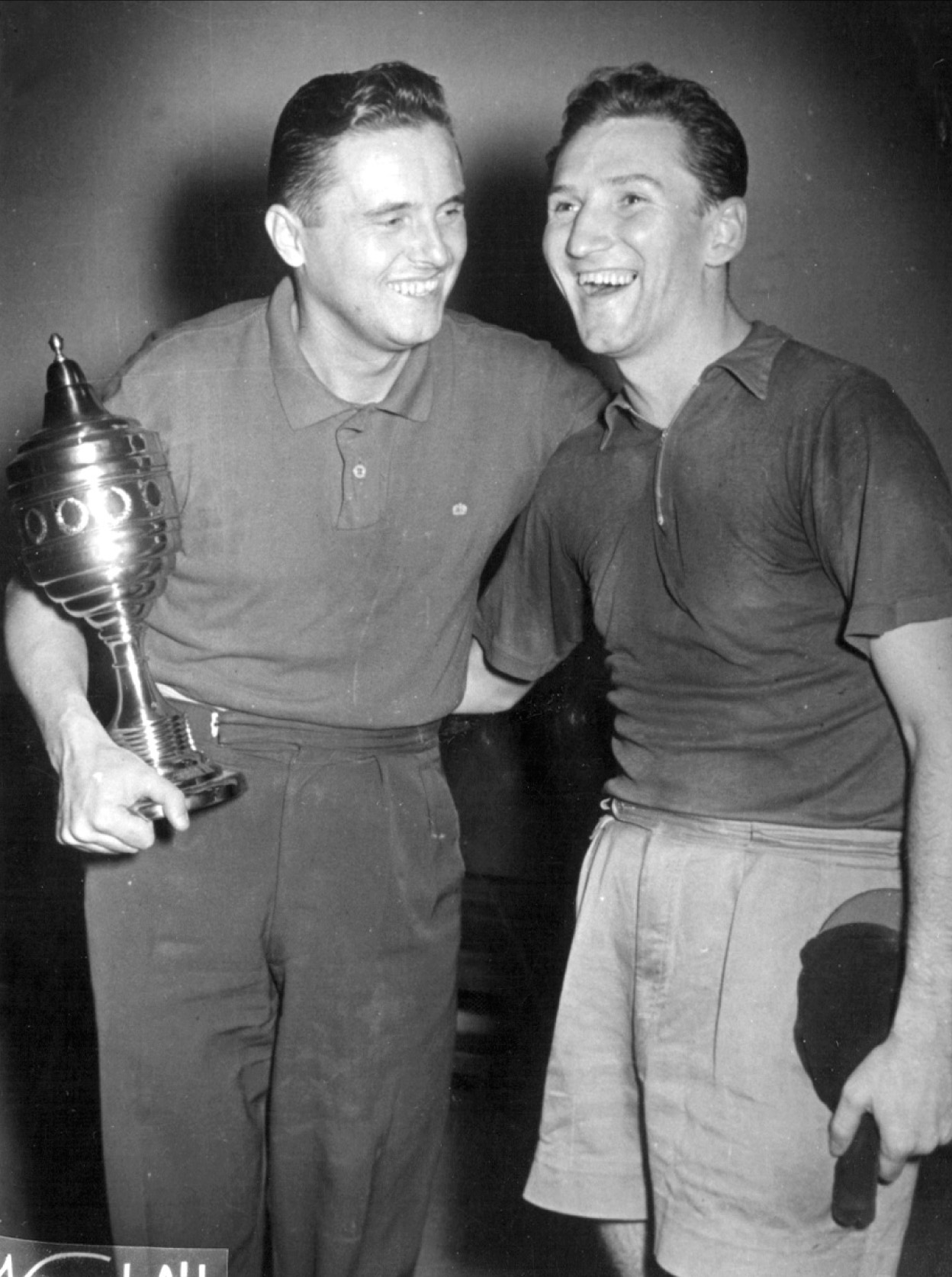
- Harangozo (left) with Žarko Dolinar

Personal information
- Nationality: Yugoslavia
- Born: 25 January 1925 Subotica, Kingdom of Serbs, Croats and Slovenes
- Died: 14 January 1975 (aged 49) Belgrade, SR Serbia, SFR Yugoslavia

Sport
- Sport: Table tennis
Medal record
Men's table tennis
Representing Yugoslavia
World Championships
| Silver medal – second place | 1955 Utrecht | Doubles |
| Gold medal – first place | 1954 Wembley | Doubles |
| Silver medal – second place | 1951 Vienna | Mixed Doubles |
| Bronze medal – third place | 1951 Vienna | Team |
European Championships
| Bronze medal – third place | 1958 Budapest | Singles |

Vilim Harangozo (Hungarian: Harangozó Vilim, Serbian Cyrillic: Вилим Харангозо) was an ethnic Hungarian former table tennis player from Yugoslavia.

== Table tennis career ==
From 1951 to 1958 Harangozo won several medals in singles, doubles, and team events in the Table Tennis European Championships and in the World Table Tennis Championships.

His four World Championship medals included a gold medal in the doubles at the 1954 World Table Tennis Championships with Žarko Dolinar.

He also won three English Open titles.

== Football ==
Harangozo also played as footballer at FK Spartak Subotica in the Yugoslav First League during the late 1940s. He scored the first ever first league goal of Spartak and it was against giants Red Star Belgrade. He also played with FK Bratstvo Subotica in the 1948–49 season.

== Personal life ==
His older brother Tibor Harangozo (1922–1978) was also an international table tennis player.

== See also ==
- List of table tennis players
- List of World Table Tennis Championships medalists
