= Brian Kennedy (table tennis) =

British table tennis player

Personal information
- Nationality: England
Medal record
Representing England
World Table Tennis Championships
| Gold medal – first place | 1953 | Men's Team |
| Bronze medal – third place | 1955 | Men's Team |

Brian Kennedy is a former international table tennis player from England.

Kennedy won a gold medal at the 1953 World Table Tennis Championships in the men's team event with Richard Bergmann, Adrian Haydon, Johnny Leach and Aubrey Simons for England.

Two years later he won a bronze medal at the 1955 World Table Tennis Championships in the men's team event.

Kennedy also won an English Open title.

== See also ==
- List of table tennis players
- List of World Table Tennis Championships medalists
- List of England players at the World Team Table Tennis Championships
