= Ermelinde Wertl =

Austrian table tennis player

Personal information
- Born: 27 March 1934 Guggenbach, Übelbach, Austria
- Died: July 2004 (aged 70) Vienna, Austria

Sport
- Sport: Table tennis
Medal record
Representing Austria
World Table Tennis Championships
Silver medal – second place	1951	Mixed doubles
Silver medal – second place	1951	Women's team
Bronze medal – third place	1952	Women's singles
Bronze medal – third place	1952	Women's doubles
Silver medal – second place	1953	Mixed doubles
Bronze medal – third place	1953	Women's doubles
Bronze medal – third place	1953	Women's team
Bronze medal – third place	1954	Mixed doubles
Silver medal – second place	1955	Women's singles

Ermelinde Wertl (27 March 1934 – July 2004) was an Austrian international table tennis player.

She won nine World Table Tennis Championship medals from the 1951 World Table Tennis Championships to the 1955 World Table Tennis Championships.

She married a physician in 1954 and played as Ermlinde Wertl-Rumpler afterwards.

== See also ==
- List of table tennis players
- List of World Table Tennis Championships medalists
