= Kálmán Szepesi =

Hungarian table tennis player

Personal information
- Full name: Szepesi Kálmán
- Nationality: Hungary
- Born: 13 January 1930
- Died: 29 September 1992 (aged 62)

Sport
- Sport: Table tennis
Medal record
Men's table tennis
Representing Hungary
World Championships
Gold medal – first place	1955 Budapest	Mixed
Bronze medal – third place	1955 Budapest	Team
Silver medal – second place	1953 Bucharest	Team
Gold medal – first place	1952 Bombay	Team
Silver medal – second place	1951 Vienna	Team

Kálmán Szepesi (13 January 1930 – 29 September 1992) was a male former international table tennis player from Hungary.

== Table tennis career ==
He won several medals in doubles, and team events in the World Table Tennis Championships in 1951 to 1955. Szepesi's five World Championship medals included two gold medals; one in the team event and one in the mixed doubles at the 1955 World Table Tennis Championships with Éva Kóczián. He also won an English Open title.

== See also ==
- List of table tennis players
- List of World Table Tennis Championships medalists
