= József Kóczián =

Hungarian table tennis player

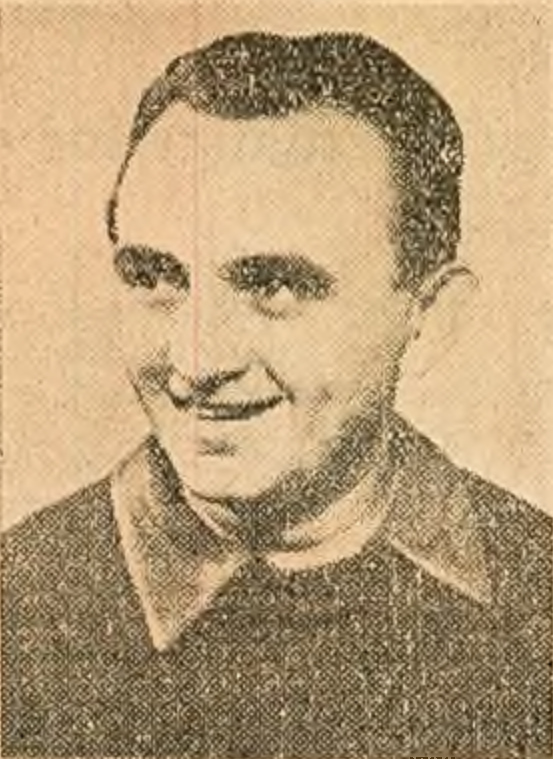

Personal information
- Nationality: Hungary Sweden
- Born: 4 August 1926
- Died: 10 December 2009 (aged 83)

Sport
- Sport: Table tennis
Medal record
Representing Hungary
World Table Tennis Championships
Gold medal – first place	1949	Men's Team
Gold medal – first place	1952	Men's Team
Gold medal – first place	1953	Men's Doubles
Silver medal – second place	1950	Men's Team
Silver medal – second place	1951	Men's Team
Silver medal – second place	1951	Men's Doubles
Silver medal – second place	1952	Men's Singles
Silver medal – second place	1953	Men's Team
Bronze medal – third place	1951	Mixed Doubles
Bronze medal – third place	1952	Mixed Doubles
Bronze medal – third place	1953	Men's Singles
Bronze medal – third place	1953	Mixed Doubles
Bronze medal – third place	1955	Men's Doubles
Bronze medal – third place	1955	Men's Team

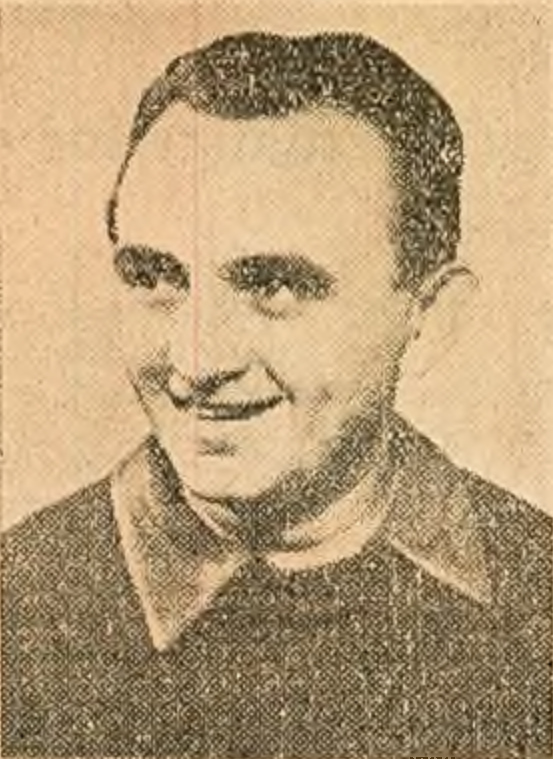
József Kóczián 1953

József Kóczián (4 August 1926 – 10 December 2009) was a Hungarian table tennis player, who won three world championships during his career.

== Table tennis career ==
Following the Second World War, he made his first World Championships appearance in 1947 in Paris. He was a regular at the global event until 1959 when he made his final bow in Dortmund, Germany representing Sweden. József's sister Éva was also a table tennis player.

=== Medal Count ===
He won a total of 14 medals at World Championships during that 12-year period; notably clinching three gold medals. In 1949/Stockholm and 1952/Bombay he was a member of the successful Hungarian team that won the Swaythling Cup. In 1953 he partnered with fellow Hungarian Ferenc Sidó to clinch the top prize in the Men's Doubles competition.

== See also ==
- List of table tennis players
- List of World Table Tennis Championships medalists
