= Sari Szasz =

Romanian table tennis player

Sári Szász (Kolozsvári)
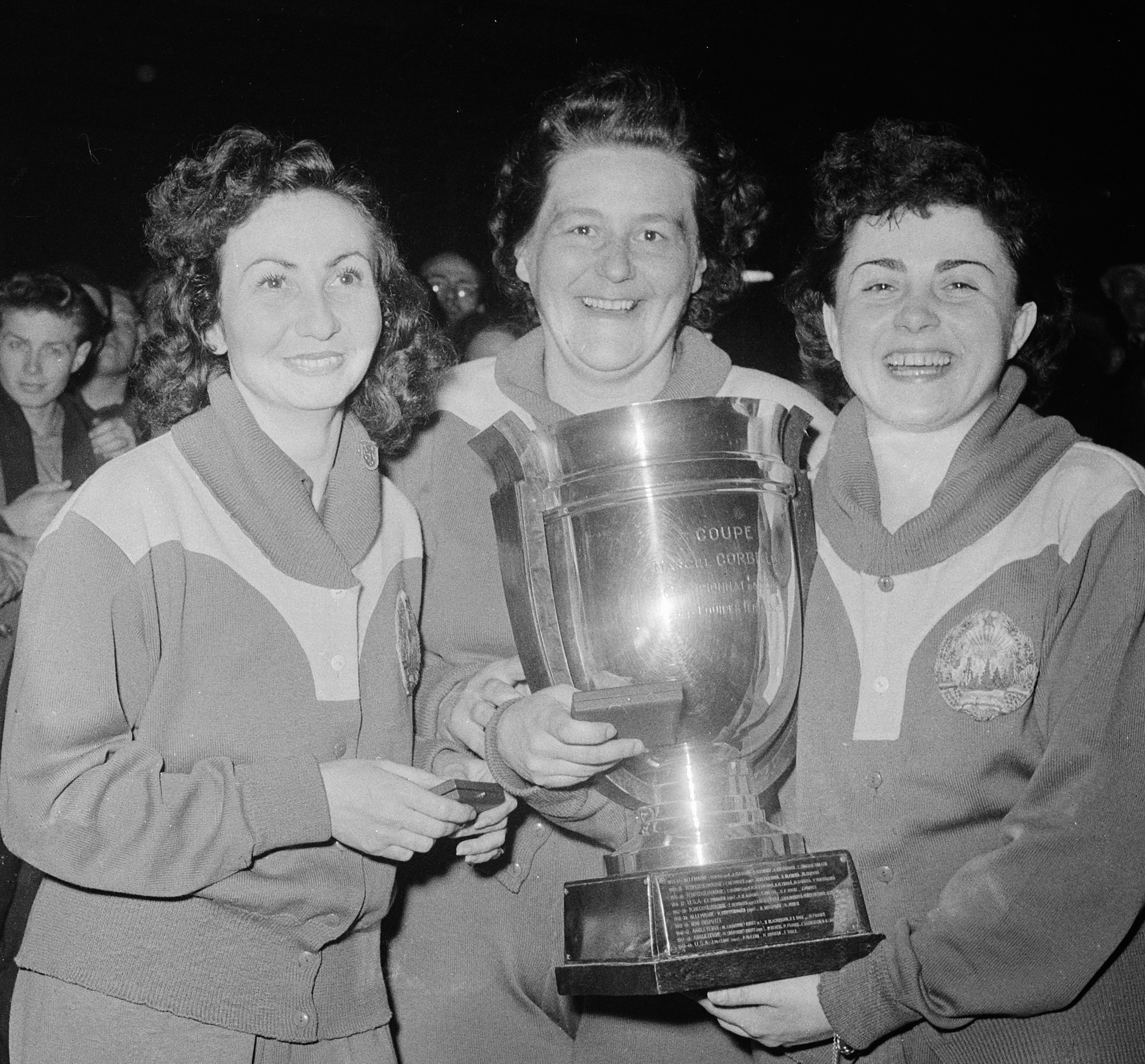
- Angelica Rozeanu, Sari Szász and Ella Zeller at the 1955 World Championships

Personal information
- Full name: Sári Szász (Kolozsvári)
- Nationality: Romania
- Born: 1922
- Died: 19 February 2006 (aged 83–84)

Sport
- Sport: Table tennis
Medal record
Table tennis
Representing Romania
World Championships
Gold medal – first place	1955 Utrecht	Team
Gold medal – first place	1953 Bucharest	Team
Silver medal – second place	1952 Bombay	Team
Silver medal – second place	1951 Vienna	Doubles
Gold medal – first place	1951 Vienna	Team
Bronze medal – third place	1950 Budapest	Singles
Gold medal – first place	1950 Budapest	Team
Bronze medal – third place	1948 Wembley	Team
Silver medal – second place	1939 Kairo	Doubles
Bronze medal – third place	1939 Kairo	Team

Sári Szász (married name Kolozsvári), (1922 – February 19, 2006) was a female international table tennis player.

== Table tennis career ==
From 1950 to 1955 she won ten medals in singles, doubles, and team events in the World Table Tennis Championships.

The ten World Championship medals included four gold medals in the team event for Romania.

== See also ==
- List of table tennis players
- List of World Table Tennis Championships medalists
