= Ferenc Sidó =

Hungarian table tennis player

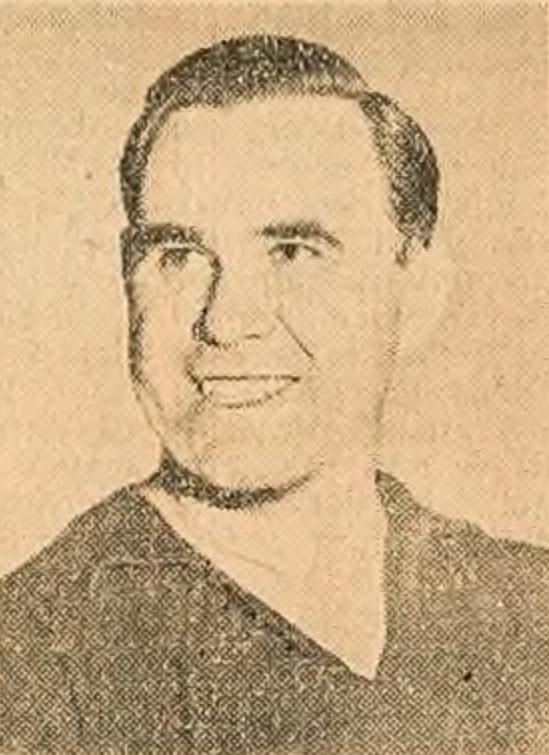
- Sidó in 1953

Personal information
- Full name: SIDÓ Ferenc
- Nationality: Hungary
- Born: 18 April 1923 Pata, Czechoslovakia
- Died: 6 February 1998 (aged 74) Budapest, Hungary

Sport
- Sport: Table tennis
Medal record
Men's table tennis
Representing Hungary
World Championships
Silver medal – second place	1961 Beijing	Doubles
Bronze medal – third place	1961 Beijing	Team
Silver medal – second place	1959 Dortmund	Singles
Silver medal – second place	1959 Dortmund	Team
Bronze medal – third place	1957 Stockholm	Doubles
Silver medal – second place	1957 Stockholm	Team
Bronze medal – third place	1955 Utrecht	Singles
Bronze medal – third place	1955 Utrecht	Doubles
Bronze medal – third place	1955 Utrecht	Team
Gold medal – first place	1953 Bucharest	Singles
Gold medal – first place	1953 Bucharest	Doubles
Gold medal – first place	1953 Bucharest	Mixed Doubles
Silver medal – second place	1953 Bucharest	Team
Gold medal – first place	1952 Bombay	Mixed Doubles
Gold medal – first place	1952 Bombay	Team
Bronze medal – third place	1951 Vienna	Singles
Silver medal – second place	1951 Vienna	Doubles
Silver medal – second place	1951 Vienna	Team
Bronze medal – third place	1950 Budapest	Singles
Gold medal – first place	1950 Budapest	Doubles
Gold medal – first place	1950 Budapest	Mixed Doubles
Silver medal – second place	1950 Budapest	Team
Gold medal – first place	1949 Stockholm	Mixed Doubles
Gold medal – first place	1949 Stockholm	Team
Bronze medal – third place	1948 Wembley	Mixed Doubles
Silver medal – second place	1947 Paris	Singles
European Championships
Gold medal – first place	1960 Zagreb	Doubles
Gold medal – first place	1960 Zagreb	Team
Silver medal – second place	1958 Budapest	Mixed Doubles
Gold medal – first place	1958 Budapest	Team

Ferenc Sidó (18 April 1923 in Pata – 6 February 1998 in Budapest) was a Hungarian international table tennis player. He was born in an ethnic Hungarian family in present-day Slovakia.

== Table tennis career ==
From 1947 to 1961 he won 26 medals in singles, doubles, and team events in the World Table Tennis Championships

The 26 medals included nine gold medals; one in the men's singles, two in the men's doubles with József Kóczián and Ferenc Soos, two in the men's team event and four in the mixed doubles with Gizi Farkas and Angelica Rozeanu.

He also won four English Open titles.

== See also ==
- List of table tennis players
- List of World Table Tennis Championships medalists
