= Angelica Rozeanu =

Romanian table tennis player (1921–2006)

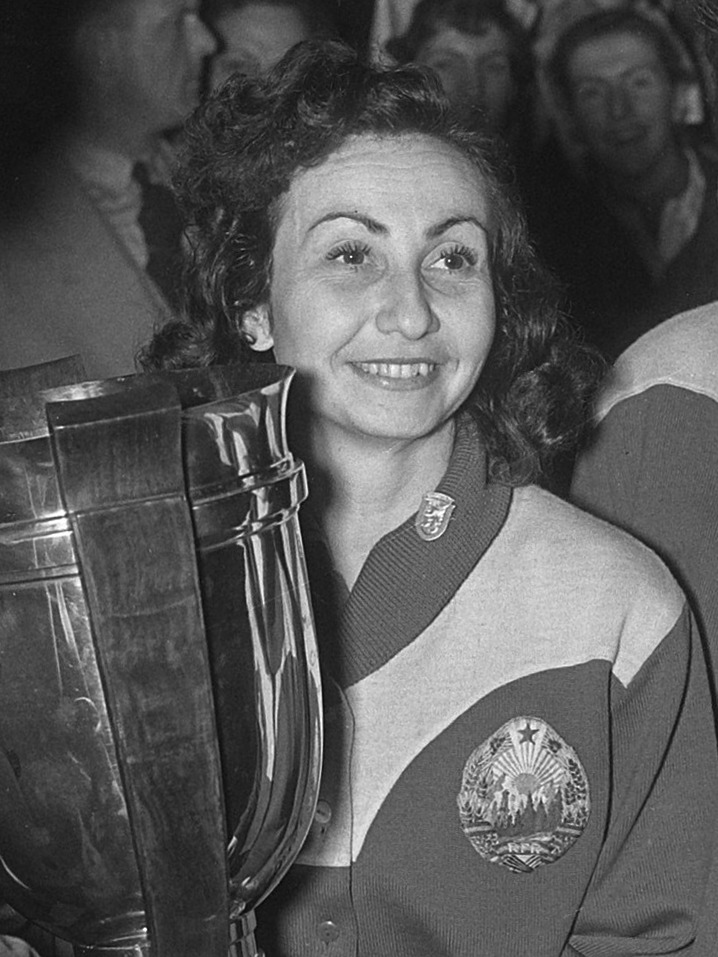
- Angelica Rozeanu at the 1955 World Championships

Personal information
- Full name: Angelica Rozeanu-Adelstein
- Nationality: Romania/Israel
- Born: 15 October 1921 Bucharest, Romania
- Died: 21 February 2006 (aged 84) Haifa, Israel

Sport
- Sport: Table tennis
Medal record
Representing Romania
World Championships
Bronze medal – third place	1957 Stockholm	Doubles
Silver medal – second place	1957 Stockholm	Team
Gold medal – first place	1956 Tokyo	Doubles
Gold medal – first place	1956 Tokyo	Team
Gold medal – first place	1955 Utrecht	Singles
Gold medal – first place	1955 Utrecht	Doubles
Gold medal – first place	1955 Utrecht	Team
Gold medal – first place	1954 Wembley	Singles
Bronze medal – third place	1954 Wembley	Doubles
Gold medal – first place	1953 Bucharest	Singles
Gold medal – first place	1953 Bucharest	Doubles
Gold medal – first place	1953 Bucharest	Mixed doubles
Gold medal – first place	1953 Bucharest	Team
Gold medal – first place	1952 Bombay	Singles
Gold medal – first place	1952 Bombay	Mixed doubles
Silver medal – second place	1952 Bombay	Team
Gold medal – first place	1951 Vienna	Singles
Silver medal – second place	1951 Vienna	Doubles
Gold medal – first place	1951 Vienna	Mixed doubles
Gold medal – first place	1951 Vienna	Team
Gold medal – first place	1950 Budapest	Singles
Silver medal – second place	1950 Budapest	Doubles
Bronze medal – third place	1950 Budapest	Mixed doubles
Gold medal – first place	1950 Budapest	Team
Bronze medal – third place	1948 Wembley	Singles
Bronze medal – third place	1948 Wembley	Mixed doubles
Bronze medal – third place	1948 Wembley	Team
Silver medal – second place	1939 Cairo	Doubles
Bronze medal – third place	1939 Cairo	Team
Bronze medal – third place	1937 Baden	Mixed doubles
European Championships
Gold medal – first place	1960 Zagreb	Doubles
Silver medal – second place	1960 Zagreb	Mixed doubles
Bronze medal – third place	1958 Budapest	Singles
Gold medal – first place	1958 Budapest	Doubles
Bronze medal – third place	1958 Budapest	Mixed doubles
Silver medal – second place	1958 Budapest	Team

Angelica Rozeanu (née Adelstein; 15 October 1921 – 21 February 2006) was a Romanian table tennis player of Jewish origin, the most successful female table tennis player in the history of the sport, winning the women's world singles title 6 years in succession.

== Table tennis career ==
Rozeanu started playing table tennis while recovering from scarlet fever when she was eight. In 1933, at age 12, she won the Romanian Cup. She won the Romanian national championship in 1936 and remained Romania's female champion for the next 21 years (1936–57, excluding World War II). Her first major win was the 1938 Hungarian Open.

Her career was interrupted by World War II, as from 1940 to 1944 she was barred from even entering a gymnasium in Romania and was unable to play.

Rozeanu won her first World Championship in 1950, starting the winning run that would see her win the championship six years in succession, a feat yet to be matched. She was also the last non-Asian woman to win the title. In total, she won 17 world titles (and 12 silver and bronze medals at the World Championships), three world women's doubles titles, and three world mixed doubles titles. By far Romania's greatest profile in the sport, she was also the President of the Romanian Table Tennis Commission from 1950 to 1960.

Rozeanu emigrated to Israel in 1960. She won the 1961 Maccabiah Games Women's Table Tennis Championship, and was Israel's champion in 1961–62. She kept in touch with her native Romania, and visited it for the last time in 2005. In 2006, she died at the age of 84.

== Recognition ==
Rozeanu was given the Romanian title of Merited Master of Sport in 1954. She has also received four Order of Work honors. In 1997 she was awarded the Knesset Medal. She was awarded the title of Honorary Citizen of Haifa in 2001.

She was inducted into the International Jewish Sports Hall of Fame in 1981 and into the ITTF Hall of Fame in 1995.

== See also ==
- List of Jewish Romanians
- List of World Table Tennis Championships medalists

== Sources ==
- Profile at ITTF News
- Obituary at The Telegraph
- ""Angelica Rozeanu – the world's greatest female table tennis player in history," 2/21/06". Archived from the original on 27 September 2007.
- Jacov Sobovitz, Angelica Adelstein Rozeanu, Jewish Women Encyclopedia
