= 1954 World Table Tennis Championships =

1954 edition of the World Table Tennis Championships

The 1954 World Table Tennis Championships were held in Wembley from April 5 to April 14, 1954.

== Medalists ==
=== Team ===
Event	Gold	Silver	Bronze
Swaythling Cup; Men's Team	Japan; Kazuo Kawai; Ichiro Ogimura; Kichiji Tamasu; Yoshio Tomita	Czechoslovakia; Ivan Andreadis; Josef Posejpal; Adolf Šlár; Ladislav Štípek; Václav Tereba	England; Richard Bergmann; Kenneth Craigie; Johnny Leach; Aubrey Simons; Harry Venner
Corbillon Cup; Women's Team	Japan; Fujie Eguchi; Hideko Goto; Yoshiko Tanaka; Kiiko Watanabe	Hungary; Gizi Gervai-Farkas; Ilona Kerekes; Éva Kóczián; Agnes Simon	England; Kathleen Best; Ann Haydon; Diane Rowe; Rosalind Rowe

=== Individual ===
Event	Gold	Silver	Bronze
Men's singles	(Japan) Ichiro Ogimura	(Sweden) Tage Flisberg	(Czechoslovakia) Ivan Andreadis
Men's singles	(Japan) Ichiro Ogimura	(Sweden) Tage Flisberg	(England) Richard Bergmann
Women's singles	(Romania) Angelica Rozeanu	(Japan) Yoshiko Tanaka	(Hungary) Éva Kóczián
Women's singles	(Romania) Angelica Rozeanu	(Japan) Yoshiko Tanaka	(Japan) Fujie Eguchi
Men's Doubles	(Socialist Federal Republic of Yugoslavia) Žarko Dolinar (Socialist Federal Republic of Yugoslavia) Vilim Harangozo	(England) Viktor Barna (France) Michel Haguenauer	(Japan) Ichiro Ogimura (Japan) Yoshio Tomita
Men's Doubles	(Socialist Federal Republic of Yugoslavia) Žarko Dolinar (Socialist Federal Republic of Yugoslavia) Vilim Harangozo	(England) Viktor Barna (France) Michel Haguenauer	(Czechoslovakia) Adolf Šlár (Czechoslovakia) Václav Tereba
Women's doubles	(England) Diane Rowe (England) Rosalind Rowe	(England) Kathleen Best (England) Ann Haydon	(Japan) Fujie Eguchi (Japan) Kiiko Watanabe
Women's doubles	(England) Diane Rowe (England) Rosalind Rowe	(England) Kathleen Best (England) Ann Haydon	(Hungary) Gizella Gervai (Romania) Angelica Rozeanu
Mixed doubles	(Czechoslovakia) Ivan Andreadis (Hungary) Gizella Gervai-Farkas	(Japan) Yoshio Tomita (Japan) Fujie Eguchi	(England) Viktor Barna (England) Rosalind Rowe
Mixed doubles	(Czechoslovakia) Ivan Andreadis (Hungary) Gizella Gervai-Farkas	(Japan) Yoshio Tomita (Japan) Fujie Eguchi	(Socialist Federal Republic of Yugoslavia) Žarko Dolinar (Austria) Ermelinde Wertl
