= 1952 World Table Tennis Championships =

1952 edition of the World Table Tennis Championships

The 1952 World Table Tennis Championships were held in Bombay from 1 to 10 February 1952. The 1952 World Championships were marked by the arrival of the Japanese as a Table Tennis force on the world scene. In another first, the Chief Referee of the tournament was an Indian, Professor Arakalgud Subbarao.

India was chosen as the hosts for the event in March 1950 at the Congress of the International Table Tennis Federation in Budapest, Hungary. Because the Championships were held in India, the entry was reduced. Czechoslovakia, Yugoslavia, Austria and Sweden were all unable to travel to the tournament.

== Medalists ==
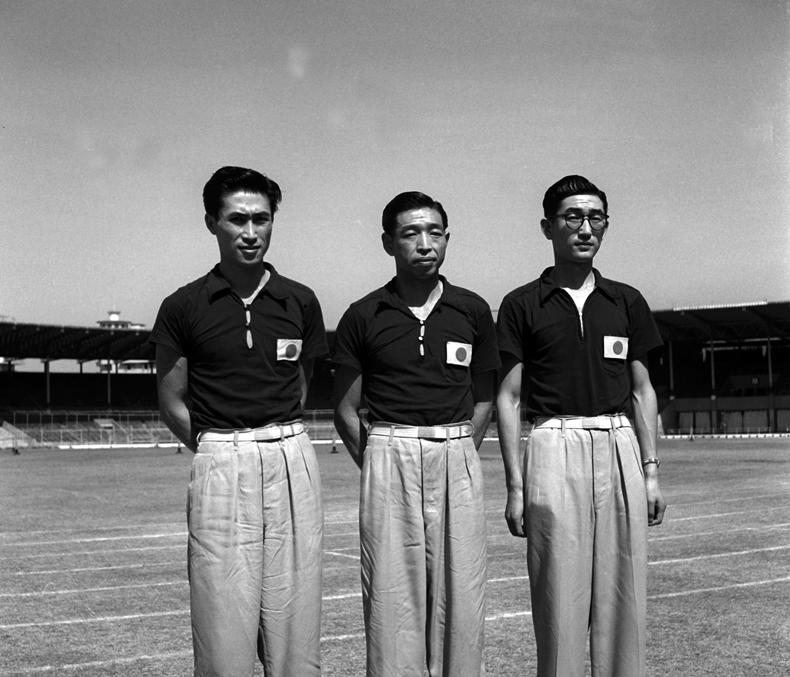
Norikazu Fujii, Tadaaki Hayashi and Hiroji Satoh of Japan, who all won Gold in respective disciplines.

=== Team ===
| Event | Gold | Silver | Bronze |
|---|---|---|---|
| Swaythling Cup; Men's Team | Hungary; Elemer Gyetvai; József Kóczián; Ferenc Sidó; Kálmán Szepesi; László Várkonyi | England; Richard Bergmann; Adrian Haydon; Johnny Leach; Aubrey Simons; Harry Venner | Japan; Daisuke Daimon; Norikazu Fujii; Tadaaki Hayashi; Hiroji Satoh |
| Swaythling Cup; Men's Team | Hungary; Elemer Gyetvai; József Kóczián; Ferenc Sidó; Kálmán Szepesi; László Várkonyi | England; Richard Bergmann; Adrian Haydon; Johnny Leach; Aubrey Simons; Harry Venner | Hong Kong; Cheng Kwok Wing; Chung Chin Sing; Fu Chi Fong; Keung Wing Ning; Suh Sui Cho |
| Corbillon Cup; Women's team | Japan; Shizuki Narahara; Tomie Nishimura | Romania; Angelica Rozeanu; Sári Szász; Ella Zeller | England; Kathleen Best; Peggy Franks; Diane Rowe; Rosalind Rowe |

=== Individual ===
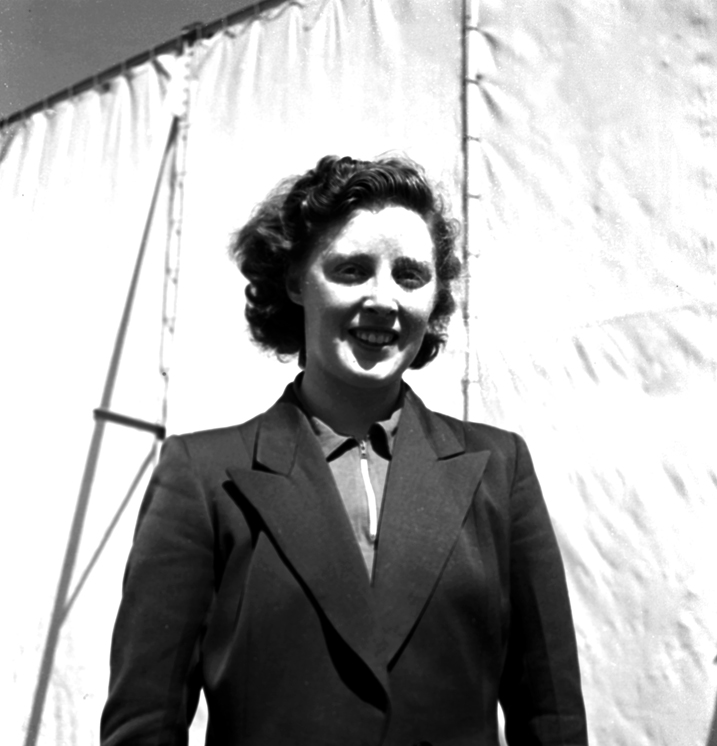
Helen Elliott at the World Table Tennis Championships at Bombay in February, 1952. She won the Bronze in Women's doubles.

| Event | Gold | Silver | Bronze |
|---|---|---|---|
| Men's singles | (Japan) Hiroji Satoh | (Hungary) József Kóczián | (France) René Roothooft |
| Men's singles | (Japan) Hiroji Satoh | (Hungary) József Kóczián | (France) Guy Amouretti |
| Women's singles | (Romania) Angelica Rozeanu | (Hungary) Gizi Farkas | (England) Rosalind Rowe |
| Women's singles | (Romania) Angelica Rozeanu | (Hungary) Gizi Farkas | (Austria) Ermelinde Wertl |
| Men's Doubles | (Japan) Norikazu Fujii (Japan) Tadaki Hayashi | (England) Richard Bergmann (England) Johnny Leach | (United States) Douglas Cartland (United States) Marty Reisman |
| Men's Doubles | (Japan) Norikazu Fujii (Japan) Tadaki Hayashi | (England) Richard Bergmann (England) Johnny Leach | (England) Viktor Barna (England) Adrian Haydon |
| Women's Doubles | (Japan) Shizuki Narahara (Japan) Tomie Nishimura | (England) Diane Rowe (England) Rosalind Rowe | (Scotland) Helen Elliott (Austria) Ermelinde Wertl |
| Women's Doubles | (Japan) Shizuki Narahara (Japan) Tomie Nishimura | (England) Diane Rowe (England) Rosalind Rowe | (Hungary) Gizi Farkas (Hungary) Edit Sági |
| Mixed doubles | (Hungary) Ferenc Sidó (Romania) Angelica Rozeanu | (England) Johnny Leach (England) Diane Rowe | (England) Viktor Barna (England) Rosalind Rowe |
| Mixed doubles | (Hungary) Ferenc Sidó (Romania) Angelica Rozeanu | (England) Johnny Leach (England) Diane Rowe | (Hungary) József Kóczián (Hungary) Gizi Farkas |
