= 1952 World Table Tennis Championships – Men's team =

1952 Swaythling Cup (men's team)

The 1952 World Table Tennis Championships – Swaythling Cup (men's team) was the 19th edition of the men's team championship.

Hungary won the gold medal defeating England 5–4 in the final. Japan and Hong Kong won a bronze medal after finishing second in their respective groups.

== Medalists ==
Event	Gold	Silver	Bronze
	Hungary; Elemer Gyetvai; József Kóczián; Ferenc Sidó; Kálmán Szepesi; László Várkonyi	England; Richard Bergmann; Adrian Haydon; Johnny Leach; Aubrey Simons; Harry Venner	Japan; Daisuke Daimon; Norikazu Fujii; Tadaaki Hayashi; Hiroji Satoh
	Hungary; Elemer Gyetvai; József Kóczián; Ferenc Sidó; Kálmán Szepesi; László Várkonyi	England; Richard Bergmann; Adrian Haydon; Johnny Leach; Aubrey Simons; Harry Venner	Hong Kong; Cheng Kwok Wing; Chung Chin Sing; Fu Chi Fong; Keung Wing Ning; Suh Sui Cho

== Swaythling Cup tables ==
=== Group A ===
Pos	Team	P	W	L	Pts
1	England	7	7	0	14
2	Japan	7	6	1	12
3	France	7	5	2	10
4	India	7	4	3	8
5	Germany	7	3	4	6
6	Portugal	7	2	5	4
7	Cambodia	7	1	6	2
8	Pakistan	7	0	7	0

=== Group B ===
Pos	Team	P	W	L	Pts
1	Hungary	6	6	0	12
2	Hong Kong	6	5	1	10
3	Vietnam	6	4	2	8
4	Brazil	6	3	3	6
5	Singapore	6	2	4	4
6	Chile	6	1	5	2
7	Afghanistan	6	0	6	0
8	(Myanmar) Burma +	0	0	0	0
8	(South Korea) Korea +	0	0	0	0

+ withdrew

== Final ==
Hungary 5		England 4	Score	Match score
Szepesi	lost to	Leach	21–8 14–21 15–21	0–1
Kóczián	bt	Simons+	21–7 21–16	1–1
Sidó	lost to	Bergmann	16–21 17–21	1–2
Kóczián	bt	Leach	21–18 21–15	2–2
Szepesi	lost to	Bergmann	13–21 6–21	2–3
Sidó	bt	Simons+	w/o tie conceded	3–3
Kóczián	lost to	Bergmann	12–21 19–21	3–4
Sidó	bt	Leach	21–19 21–17	4–4
Szepesi	bt	Simons+	23–21 9–21 21–16	5–4

+ Simons picked up an injury during the game against Kóczián and had to concede the match against Sidó. With the match at 4–4, he had no choice but to play his third match with the injury.

== See also ==
List of World Table Tennis Championships medalists
