= 1933 World Table Tennis Championships – Men's team =

1933 Swaythling Cup (men's team)

The 1933 World Table Tennis Championships – Swaythling Cup (men's team) was the seventh edition of the men's team championship.

Hungary won the gold medal with a perfect 10–0 match record. England and Austria tied for bronze.

== Swaythling Cup final table ==
Pos	Team	P	W	L	Squad
1	Hungary	10	10	0	Viktor Barna, István Boros, Lajos Dávid, Sándor Glancz, István Kelen
2	Czechoslovakia	10	9	1	Oldrich Blecha, Miloslav Hamr, Erwin Koln-Korda, Stanislav Kolář, Karel Svoboda
3	Austria	10	7	3	Manfred Feher, Paul Flussmann, Erwin Kohn, Alfred Liebster, Ferry Weiss
3	England	10	7	3	Alec Brook, Adrian Haydon, David Jones, Andrew Millar, Edward Rimer
5	Latvia	10	6	4	Mordecai Finberg, Arnold Oschin, Schatzow, Doerin Stamms
6	(Socialist Federal Republic of Yugoslavia) Yugoslavia	10	5	5	Milan Antolković, Ladislav Hexner, Stevica Maksimović, Ludovik Nemec, Otto Weissbacher
7	Germany	10	4	6	Heinz Benthien, Erich Desiler, Nikita Madjaroglou, Heinz Nickelsburg, Albert Schimmel
7	India	10	4	6	Mohammed Ayub, Jimmy Dass, De Condappa, A.Guha, Kondal
9	France	10	2	8	Henri Bolleli, Daniel Guérin, Michel Haguenauer, Raymond Verger, Tolla Vologe
10	Wales	10	1	9	Harold Crocker, Evans, Thomas Lisle, Horace Needles, Len Samuel
11	Belgium	10	0	10	Celis, Robert Eymael, Omer Goditiabois

== See also ==
List of World Table Tennis Championships medalists
