= 1952 World Table Tennis Championships – Mixed doubles =

1952 Mixed doubles

The 1952 World Table Tennis Championships mixed doubles was the 19th edition of the mixed doubles championship.

Ferenc Sidó and Angelica Rozeanu defeated Johnny Leach and Diane Rowe in the final by three sets to nil.

== Results ==
Round of 16
(France) Michel Haguenauer (Austria) Ermelinde Wertl	16	21	21	11	21
(Hong Kong) Suh Sui Cho (Hong Kong) Wong Bik-Yiu	21	12	12	21	16
(England) Johnny Leach (England) Diane Rowe	21	21	21
(India) Uttam Chandarana (India) Vijaya Rajagopalan	16	12	15
(France) René Roothooft (Austria) Gertrude Pritzi	19	21	21	21
(United States) Marty Reisman (Scotland) Helen Elliot	21	12	13	19
(Hungary) József Kóczián (Hungary) Gizi Farkas	21	21	21
(England) Harry Venner (England) Kathleen Best	14	15	11
(England) Viktor Barna (England) Rosalind Rowe	21	17	21	21
(Japan) Norikazu Fujii (Japan) Shizuki Narahara	17	21	18	18
(India) Randir Bhandari (India) Sayeed Sultana	21	21	21
(India) de Jayanta (India) K. John	10	17	12
(England) Richard Bergmann (England) Peggy Franks	21	21	21
(India) V. Sivaraman (India) A. Rukmini	16	7	16
(Hungary) Ferenc Sidó (Romania) Angelica Rozeanu	21	21	21
(India) Kalyanpur Jayant (India) Chaman Kapur	13	11	13

Quarterfinals
(France) Haguenauer (Austria) Wertl	6	17	20
(England) Leach (England) Rowe D	21	21	22
(France) Roothoft (Austria) Pritzi	22	12	18	20
(Hungary) Kóczián (Hungary) Farkas	20	21	21	22
(England) Barna (England) Rowe R	21	21	21
(India) Bhandari (India) Sultana	15	19	9
(England) Bergmann (England) Franks	21	21	21
(Hungary) Sidó (Romania) Rozeanu	15	17	19

Semifinals
(England) Leach (England) Rowe D	23	20	21	21
(Hungary) Kóczián (Hungary) Farkas	21	22	16	13
(England) Barna (England) Rowe R	17	22	15	14
(Hungary) Sidó (Romania) Rozeanu	21	20	21	21

Final
(England) Leach (England) Rowe D	19	13	18
(Hungary) Sidó (Romania) Rozeanu	21	21	21

== See also ==
List of World Table Tennis Championships medalists
