= 1955 World Table Tennis Championships – Women's doubles =

1955 Women's doubles

The 1955 World Table Tennis Championships women's doubles was the 21st edition of the women's doubles championship. Ella Zeller and Angelica Rozeanu defeated Diane Rowe and Rosalind Rowe in the final by three sets to two.

== Results ==
Round of 16
(England) Diane Rowe (England) Rosalind Rowe	3
(Czechoslovakia) Libuše Grafková (Czechoslovakia) Eliška Krejčová	1
(Hungary) Éva Kóczián (Hungary) Agnes Almási	3
(Netherlands) Coby van Megen (Netherlands) Noortje van Megen	0
(Austria) Gertrude Pritzi (Austria) Friederike Lauber	3
(England) Pamela Mortimer (England) Peggy Franks	1
(Japan) Kiiko Watanabe (Japan) Fujie Eguchi	3
(Sweden) Signhild Tegner (Sweden) Elisabeth Thorsson	0
(Romania) Sári Szász-Kolozsvári (Hungary) Ilona Kerekes-Sólyom	0
(Japan) Yoshiko Tanaka (Japan) Shizuki Narahara	3
(Austria) Ermelinde Rumpler-Wertl (England) Ann Haydon-Jones	3
(West Germany) Hanne Schlaf-Imlau (West Germany) Uschi Fiedler	0
(Sweden) Birgitta Tegner (France) Simone Tarlet	0
(Scotland) Helen Elliot (England) Jean Winn	3
(Netherlands) Maria van Klampen (Netherlands) Maria Overloop	0
(Romania) Ella Zeller (Romania) Angelica Rozeanu	3

Quarterfinals
(England) Rowe D (England) Rowe R	3
(Hungary) Kóczián (Hungary) Almási	2
(Austria) Pritzi (Austria) Lauber	2
(Japan) Watanabe (Japan) Eguchi	3
(Japan) Tanaka (Japan) Narahara	3
(Austria) Rumpler-Wertl (England) Haydon-Jones	0
(Scotland) Elliot (England) Winn	1
(Romania) Zeller (Romania) Rozeanu	3

Semifinals
(England) Rowe D (England) Rowe R	3
(Japan) Watanabe (Japan) Eguchi	0
(Japan) Tanaka (Japan) Narahara	0
(Romania) Zeller (Romania) Rozeanu	3

Final
(England) Rowe D (England) Rowe R	17	21	21	19	16
(Romania) Zeller (Romania) Rozeanu	21	16	17	21	21

== See also ==
- List of World Table Tennis Championships medalists
