= 1954 World Table Tennis Championships – Mixed doubles =

1954 Mixed doubles

The 1954 World Table Tennis Championships mixed doubles was the 21st edition of the mixed doubles championship.

Ivan Andreadis and Gizi Farkas defeated Yoshio Tomita and Fujie Eguchi in the final by three sets to one.

== Results ==
Round of 16
(Czechoslovakia) Ladislav Štípek (Czechoslovakia) Eliška Krejčová	21	21	19	15	21
(Japan) Ichiro Ogimura (Japan) Kiiko Watanabe	13	8	21	21	13
(England) Viktor Barna (England) Rosalind Rowe	21	18	21	21
(Czechoslovakia) Adolf Šlár (Hungary) Agnes Simon	11	21	11	10
(England) Brian Kennedy (England) Kathleen Best	21	21	21
(England) Derek Burridge (England) Margaret Piper	14	13	10
(Czechoslovakia) Ivan Andreadis (Hungary) Gizi Farkas	21	21	21
(Hungary) Tibor Házi (United States) Leah Neuberger	13	10	15
(England) Johnny Leach (England) Diane Rowe	21	21	21
(Austria) Karl Wegrath (Austria) Friederike Lauber	14	18	19
(Japan) Yoshio Tomita (Japan) Fujie Eguchi	21	21	21
(England) Kenneth Craigie (England) Jill Rook	13	19	16
(England) Harry Venner (England) Ann Haydon	12	17	22	21	21
(Hungary) Elemér Gyetvai (Hungary) Ilona Kerekes	21	21	20	12	18
(Socialist Federal Republic of Yugoslavia) Žarko Dolinar (Austria) Ermelinde Wertl	17	21	21	21
(Romania) Tiberiu Harasztosi (Romania) Ella Zeller	21	11	15	14

Quarterfinals
(Czechoslovakia) Štípek (Czechoslovakia) Krejčová	9	14	21	21	19
(England) Barna (England) Rowe R	21	21	17	15	21
(England) Kennedy (England) Best	20	19	17
(Czechoslovakia) Andreadis (Hungary) Farkas	22	21	21
(England) Leach (England) Rowe R	17	15	21	14
(Japan) Tomita (Japan) Eguchi	21	21	19	21
(England) Venner (England) Haydon	10	16	14
(Socialist Federal Republic of Yugoslavia) Dolinar (Austria) Wertl	21	21	21

Semifinals
(England) Barna (England) Rowe R	17	19	17
(Czechoslovakia) Andreadis (Hungary) Farkas	21	21	21
(Japan) Tomita (Japan) Eguchi	21	23	21	21
(Socialist Federal Republic of Yugoslavia) Dolinar (Austria) Wertl	13	25	12	15

Final
(Czechoslovakia) Andreadis (Hungary) Farkas	21	19	21	23
(Japan) Tomita (Japan) Eguchi	17	21	15	21

== See also ==
- List of World Table Tennis Championships medalists
