= 1952 World Table Tennis Championships – Men's doubles =

1952 Men's doubles

The 1952 World Table Tennis Championships men's doubles was the 19th edition of the men's doubles championship. Norikazu Fujii and Tadaki Hayashi won the title after defeating Richard Bergmann and Johnny Leach in the final by three sets to two.

== Results ==
Round of 16
(England) Viktor Barna (England) Adrian Haydon	21	21	21
(Singapore) Wong Tong Goon (Singapore) Loh Kum Soon	12	19	11
(Hungary) Kálmán Szepesi (Hungary) Elemér Gyetvai	22	18	21
(France) René Roothooft (France) Michel Lanskoy	24	21	23
(East Germany) Rudi Piffl (East Germany) Heinz Schneider	21	21	21
(West Germany) Karl Ekhardt (Chile) Hugo Gonzalvez Fouquet	6	12	5
(England) Johnny Leach (England) Richard Bergmann	17	13	21	21	21
(Hong Kong) Suh Sui Cho (Hong Kong) Fu Chi Fong	21	21	18	18	15
(Hong Kong) Chung Chin Sing (Hong Kong) Keung Wing Ning	17	21	24	?
(France) Michel Haguenauer (France) Guy Amouretti	21	18	22	?
(United States) Douglas Cartland (United States) Marty Reisman	21	18	21	21
(India) Ossy Dyer (India) H M Khanchand	8	21	12	14
(Japan) Norikazu Fujii (Japan) Tadaaki Hayashi	21	21	21
(India) Kalyanpur Jayant (India) Randir Bhandari	16	19	11
(Hungary) József Kóczián (Hungary) Ferenc Sidó	21	21	21
(France) Alojzy Ehrlich (France) Stephen Cafiero	12	12	17

Quarterfinals
(England) Barna (England) Haydon	21	21	8	21
(France) Roothooft (France) Lanskoy	19	16	21	15
(East Germany) Piffl (East Germany) Schneider	12	11	16
(England) Leach (England) Bergmann	21	21	21
(Hong Kong) Cheung Chin Sing (Hong Kong) Keung Ming Ning	17	20	16
(United States) Cartland (United States) Reisman	21	22	21
(Japan) Fujii (Japan) Hayashi	21	21	21
(Hungary) Koczian (Hungary) Sido	15	19	12

Semifinals
(England) Barna (England) Haydon	5	13	21	22
(England) Leach (England) Bergmann	21	21	14	24
(United States) Cartland (United States) Reisman	8	14	19
(Japan) Fujii (Japan) Hayashi	21	21	21

Final
(England) Leach (England) Bergmann	21	21	18	17	12
(Japan) Fujii (Japan) Hayashi	12	9	21	21	21

== See also ==
List of World Table Tennis Championships medalists
