= 1954 World Table Tennis Championships – Women's team =

1954 Corbillon Cup (women's team)

The 1954 World Table Tennis Championships – Corbillon Cup (women's team) was the 14th edition of the women's team championship.

Japan won the gold medal, Hungary won the silver medal and England won the bronze medal following a three way tie in the final group play off, positions of which were eventually decided by matches won.

== Medalists ==
Event	Gold	Silver	Bronze
	Japan; Fujie Eguchi; Hideko Goto; Yoshiko Tanaka; Kiiko Watanabe	Hungary; Gizi Gervai-Farkas; Ilona Kerekes; Éva Kóczián; Agnes Simon	England; Kathleen Best; Ann Haydon; Diane Rowe; Rosalind Rowe

== Final tables ==
=== Group A ===
Pos	Team	P	W	L	Pts
1	Japan	8	8	0	16
2	Austria	8	6	2	12
3	Belgium	8	5	3	10
3	Egypt	8	5	3	10
5	(Socialist Federal Republic of Yugoslavia) Yugoslavia	8	4	4	8
5	United States	8	4	4	8
7	(Saar Protectorate) Saarland	8	2	6	4
8	Denmark	8	1	7	2
9	Switzerland	8	0	8	0

=== Group B ===
Pos	Team	P	W	L	Pts
1	England	6	6	0	12
2	Czechoslovakia	6	4	2	8
2	Wales	6	4	2	8
2	France	6	4	2	8
5	Netherlands	6	2	4	4
6	Sweden	6	1	5	2
7	Portugal	6	0	6	0
8	Italy+	0	0	0	0

+withdrew

=== Group C ===
Pos	Team	P	W	L	Pts
1	Hungary	6	6	0	12
2	Romania	6	5	1	10
3	India	6	3	3	6
3	Scotland	6	3	3	6
3	Germany	6	3	3	6
6	(Republic of Ireland) Ireland	6	1	5	2
7	Finland	6	0	6	0
8	Brazil+	0	0	0	0

+ withdrew

=== Final group ===
Pos	Team	P	W	L	MW	ML	Pts
1	Japan	2	1	1	5	4	2
2	Hungary	2	1	1	4	4	2
3	England	2	1	1	4	5	2

== Final group matches ==
Hungary 3		England 1	Score
Farkas-Gervai	bt	Haydon	21-18 21-12
Farkas-Gervai	bt	Rowe R	21-198 15-21 21-18
Kóczián	lost to	Rowe R	14-21 19-21
Kóczián & Simon	bt	Rowe R & Rowe D	21-18 23-21

England 3		Japan 2	Score
Rowe D	bt	Tanaka	20-22 21-17 22-20
Rowe D	lost to	Watanabe	13-21 13-21
Rowe R	lost to	Tanaka	17-21 20-22
Rowe R	bt	Watanabe	24-22 18-21 21-16
Rowe R & Rowe D	bt	Tanaka & Watanabe	9-21 21-16 21-17

Japan 3		Hungary 1	Score
Tanaka	lost to	Farkas-Gervai	18-21 21-13 17-21
Watanabe	bt	Farkas-Gervai	21-7 16-21 21-8
Watanabe	bt	Kóczián	16-21 21-19 21-12
Eguchi & Watanabe	bt	Kóczián & Simon	18-21 21-15 21-12

== See also ==
List of World Table Tennis Championships medalists
