= 1933 World Table Tennis Championships – Men's doubles =

1933 Men's doubles

The 1933 World Table Tennis Championships men's doubles was the seventh edition of the men's doubles championship. Sándor Glancz and Viktor Barna defeated Lajos Dávid and István Kelen in the final by three sets to two. Barna playing with his new doubles partner Glancz, won his fifth consecutive doubles title.

== Results ==
Round of 16
(Latvia) Mordecai Finberg (Latvia) I Schatzow	21	21	10	12	17
(Kingdom of Hungary) Lajos Dávid (Kingdom of Hungary) István Kelen	18	15	21	21	21
(Czechoslovakia) Oldrich Blecha (Czechoslovakia) Erwin Koln-Korda	15	21	21	11	21
(Austria) Robert Thum (Austria) Erwin Fleischmann	21	18	15	21	14
(England) Adrian Haydon (England) David Jones	21	17	15	21	21
(Kingdom of Hungary) István Boros (Kingdom of Hungary) Tibor Házi	19	21	21	14	12
(Austria) Manfred Feher (Austria) Alfred Liebster	21	21
(Socialist Federal Republic of Yugoslavia) Stevica Maksimovic (Socialist Federal Republic of Yugoslavia) Ladislav Hexner	18	19	ret
(India) deCondappa (India) Jimmy Dass	14	21	14	18
(Austria) Paul Flussmann (Austria) Erwin Kohn	21	19	21	21
(Kingdom of Hungary) Béla Nyitrai (Kingdom of Hungary) Ernő Földi	21	21	22
(England) Andrew Millar (England) Edward Rimer	12	11	20
(Czechoslovakia) Stanislav Kolář (Czechoslovakia) Karel Svoboda	21	21	21
(Austria) Karl Fischer (Austria) Weiger	17	18	19
(Austria) Horwitz (Austria) Kurt Defris	14	19	19
(Kingdom of Hungary) Sándor Glancz (Kingdom of Hungary) Viktor Barna	21	21	21

Quarterfinals
(Kingdom of Hungary) Dávid (Kingdom of Hungary) Kelen	21	19	21	19	21
(Czechoslovakia) Koln-Korda (Czechoslovakia) Blecha	17	21	19	21	14
(England) Haydon (England) Jones	24	21	11	10
(Austria) Feher (Austria) Liebster	26	19	21	21
(Austria) Flussmann (Austria) Kohn	21	21	21
(Kingdom of Hungary) Nyitrai (Kingdom of Hungary) Földi	11	19	11
(Czechoslovakia) Kolář (Czechoslovakia) Svoboda	15	21	14	21	12
(Kingdom of Hungary) Glancz (Kingdom of Hungary) Barna	21	18	21	17	21

Semifinals
(Kingdom of Hungary) Dávid (Kingdom of Hungary) Kelen	21	22	21
(Austria) Feher (Austria) Liebster	15	20	14
(Austria) Flussmann (Austria) Kohn	13	5	19
(Kingdom of Hungary) Glancz (Kingdom of Hungary) Barna	21	21	21

Final
(Kingdom of Hungary) Dávid (Kingdom of Hungary) Kelen	16	22	18	21	16
(Kingdom of Hungary) Glancz (Kingdom of Hungary) Barna	21	20	21	16	21

== See also ==
List of World Table Tennis Championships medalists
