= 1954 World Table Tennis Championships – Men's team =

1954 Swaythling Cup (men's team)

The 1954 World Table Tennis Championships – Swaythling Cup (men's team) was the 21st edition of the men's team championship.

Japan won the gold medal defeating Czechoslovakia 5–4 in the decisive final group match. England won the bronze medal after finishing third in the final group.

== Medalists ==
Event	Gold	Silver	Bronze
	Japan; Kazuo Kawai; Ichiro Ogimura; Kichiji Tamasu; Yoshio Tomita	Czechoslovakia; Ivan Andreadis; Josef Posejpal; Adolf Šlár; Ladislav Štípek; Václav Tereba	England; Richard Bergmann; Kenneth Craigie; Johnny Leach; Aubrey Simons; Harry Venner

== Swaythling Cup tables ==
=== Group 1 ===
Pos	Team	P	W	L	Pts
1	England	8	8	0	16
2	United States	8	6	2	12
3	France	8	6	2	12
4	Brazil	8	5	3	10
5	Austria	8	4	4	8
6	Wales	8	2	6	4
7	Israel	8	2	6	4
8	Pakistan	8	1	7	2
9	Italy	8	0	8	0

=== Group 2 ===
Pos	Team	P	W	L	Pts
1	Japan	8	8	0	16
2	Hungary	8	7	1	14
3	Romania	8	6	2	12
4	India	8	5	3	10
5	Egypt	8	4	4	8
6	Netherlands	8	3	5	6
7	Spain	8	2	6	4
8	Portugal	8	1	7	2
9	Scotland	8	0	8	0

=== Group 3 ===
Pos	Team	P	W	L	Pts
1	Czechoslovakia	8	8	0	16
2	(Socialist Federal Republic of Yugoslavia) Yugoslavia	8	7	1	14
3	Sweden	8	6	2	12
4	Germany	8	5	3	10
5	(Republic of Ireland) Ireland	8	4	4	8
6	Belgium	8	3	5	6
7	New Zealand	8	2	6	4
8	Australia	8	1	7	2
9	Switzerland	8	0	8	0

=== Final group ===
Pos	Team	P	W	L	Pts
1	Japan	2	2	0	4
2	Czechoslovakia	2	1	1	2
3	England	2	0	2	0

== Decisive group match ==
Japan 5		Czechoslovakia 4	Score
Ogimura	lost to	Andreadis	13-21 19–21
Ogimura	bt	Štípek	21-18 17-21 21–14
Ogimura	bt	Tereba	21-14 21–15
Tamasu	lost to	Andreadis	13-21 19–21
Tamasu	bt	Štípek	21-18 17-21 21–14
Tamasu	bt	Tereba	21-14 21–15
Tomita	lost to	Andreadis	12-21 14–21
Tomita	lost to	Štípek	15-21 22-20 21–23
Tomita	bt	Tereba	21-15 21–10

== See also ==
List of World Table Tennis Championships medalists
