= 1933 World Table Tennis Championships (January) =

The 7th World Table Tennis Championships were held in Baden bei Wien from 31 January to 5 February 1933.

== Medalists ==
=== Team ===
Event	Gold	Silver	Bronze
Swaythling Cup; Men's team	Hungary; Viktor Barna; István Boros; Lajos Dávid; Sándor Glancz; István Kelen	Czechoslovakia; Oldrich Blecha; Miloslav Hamr; Erwin Koln-Korda; Stanislav Kolář; Karel Svoboda	Austria; Manfred Feher; Paul Flussmann; Erwin Kohn; Alfred Liebster; Ferry Weiss
Swaythling Cup; Men's team	Hungary; Viktor Barna; István Boros; Lajos Dávid; Sándor Glancz; István Kelen	Czechoslovakia; Oldrich Blecha; Miloslav Hamr; Erwin Koln-Korda; Stanislav Kolář; Karel Svoboda	England; Alec Brook; Adrian Haydon; David Jones; Andrew Millar; Edward Rimer

=== Individual ===
Event	Gold	Silver	Bronze
Men's singles	(Kingdom of Hungary) Viktor Barna	(Czechoslovakia) Stanislav Kolář	(Kingdom of Hungary) Sándor Glancz
Men's singles	(Kingdom of Hungary) Viktor Barna	(Czechoslovakia) Stanislav Kolář	(England) Adrian Haydon
Women's singles	(Kingdom of Hungary) Anna Sipos	(Kingdom of Hungary) Mária Mednyánszky	(Germany) Astrid Krebsbach
Women's singles	(Kingdom of Hungary) Anna Sipos	(Kingdom of Hungary) Mária Mednyánszky	(Kingdom of Hungary) Magda Gál
Men's Doubles	(Kingdom of Hungary) Viktor Barna (Kingdom of Hungary) Sándor Glancz	(Kingdom of Hungary) Lajos Dávid (Kingdom of Hungary) István Kelen	(Austria) Paul Flussmann (Austria) Erwin Kohn
Men's Doubles	(Kingdom of Hungary) Viktor Barna (Kingdom of Hungary) Sándor Glancz	(Kingdom of Hungary) Lajos Dávid (Kingdom of Hungary) István Kelen	(Austria) Manfred Feher (Austria) Alfred Liebster
Women's Doubles	(Kingdom of Hungary) Mária Mednyánszky (Kingdom of Hungary) Anna Sipos	(Kingdom of Hungary) Magda Gál (Kingdom of Hungary) Emilné Rácz	(Czechoslovakia) Jozka Veselska (Czechoslovakia) Marie Walterová
Women's Doubles	(Kingdom of Hungary) Mária Mednyánszky (Kingdom of Hungary) Anna Sipos	(Kingdom of Hungary) Magda Gál (Kingdom of Hungary) Emilné Rácz	(Weimar Republic) Anita Felguth (Weimar Republic) Annemarie Schulz
Mixed Doubles	(Kingdom of Hungary) István Kelen (Kingdom of Hungary) Mária Mednyánszky	(Kingdom of Hungary) Sándor Glancz (Kingdom of Hungary) Magda Gál	(Kingdom of Hungary) Viktor Barna (Kingdom of Hungary) Anna Sipos
Mixed Doubles	(Kingdom of Hungary) István Kelen (Kingdom of Hungary) Mária Mednyánszky	(Kingdom of Hungary) Sándor Glancz (Kingdom of Hungary) Magda Gál	(Weimar Republic) Nikita Madjaroglou (Weimar Republic) Annemarie Schulz
