= 1954 World Table Tennis Championships – Women's singles =

1954 Women's singles

The 1954 World Table Tennis Championships women's singles was the 21st edition of the women's singles championship. Angelica Rozeanu defeated Yoshiko Tanaka in the final by three sets to one, to win a fifth consecutive title.

== Results ==
Round of 16
(Romania) Angelica Rozeanu	22	21	21
(Japan) Hideko Goto	20	9	9
(Wales) Shirley Jones	21	21	21
(France) Christiane Watel	16	17	16
(Hungary) Éva Kóczián	21	21	19	21
(England) Betty Isaacs	18	16	21	8
(England) Rosalind Rowe	21	21	21
(Hungary) Gizella Simon	18	16	14
(Japan) Fujie Eguchi	15	21	21	21
(Hungary) Gizi Gervai-Farkas	21	18	13	17
(England) Diane Rowe	21	21	21
(England) Pamela Mortimer	17	16	14
(England) Kathleen Best	21	21	21
(France) Claude Rougagnou	10	10	14
(Austria) Ermelinde Wertl	16	12	21	10
(Japan) Yoshiko Tanaka	21	21	18	21

Quarterfinals
(Romania) Rozeanu	21	21	21
(Wales) Jones	17	18	10
(Hungary) Kóczián	21	21	23	21
(England) Rowe R	8	23	21	16
(Japan) Eguchi	21	21	21
(England) Rowe D	14	8	7
(England) Best	13	14	9
(Japan) Tanaka	21	21	21

Semifinals
(Romania) Rozeanu	21	21	22
(Hungary) Kóczián	9	15	20
(Japan) Eguchi	14	10	19	14
(Japan) Tanaka	21	21	21	21

Final
(Romania) Rozeanu	21	14	21	21
(Japan) Tanaka	15	21	17	9

== See also ==
List of World Table Tennis Championships medalists
