= 1932 World Table Tennis Championships – Women's doubles =

1932 Women's doubles

The 1932 World Table Tennis Championships women's doubles was the fifth edition of the women's doubles championship. Mária Mednyánszky and Anna Sipos defeated Marie Šmídová and Anna Braunová in the final by three sets to nil.

== Results ==
Round of 16
(Kingdom of Hungary) Magda Gál? (Germany) Anita Felguth-Denker
bye
(Germany) Mona Müller-Rüster (Germany) Annemarie Haensch	21	21	21
(Czechoslovakia) Marie Kettnerová (Czechoslovakia) Mayerova	17	16	13
(Czechoslovakia) Anna Braunová (Czechoslovakia) Marie Šmídová	21	21	21
(France) Monique Ravigneaux (Czechoslovakia) Krausova	12	16	11
(Austria) Gertrude Wildam (Austria) Helly Reitzer	w/o
(Czechoslovakia) Müllerova (Czechoslovakia) Kracmerova	scr
(Kingdom of Hungary) Mária Mednyánszky (Kingdom of Hungary) Anna Sipos	21	21	21
(Czechoslovakia) Ambrosiova (Czechoslovakia) Vedralova	16	17	7
(Czechoslovakia) Schneiderova (Czechoslovakia) Vostrcilova	24	21	21	21
(Czechoslovakia) Beznoskova (Czechoslovakia) Stapferova	22	15	23	15
(Czechoslovakia) Věra Pavlásková (Czechoslovakia) Berta Zdobnická	21	21	22
(Kingdom of Hungary) Magda Gál? (Kingdom of Hungary) Emilné Rácz	17	16	20
(Czechoslovakia) Pohlova (Czechoslovakia) Jozka Veselska
bye

Quarterfinals
(Kingdom of Hungary) Gál (Germany) Felguth-Denker	21	21	21
(Germany) Müller-Rüster (Germany) Haensch	12	17	17
(Czechoslovakia) Braunová (Czechoslovakia) Šmídová	21	21	13	21
(Austria) Wildam (Austria) Reitzer	16	17	21	17
(Kingdom of Hungary) Mednyánszky (Kingdom of Hungary) Sipos	21	21	21
(Czechoslovakia) Schneiderova (Czechoslovakia) Vostrcilova	7	5	13
(Czechoslovakia) Pavlásková (Czechoslovakia) Zdobnická	21	21	21
(Czechoslovakia) Pohlova (Czechoslovakia) Veselska	12	16	16

Semifinals
(Kingdom of Hungary) Gál (Kingdom of Hungary) Felguth-Denker	21	10	13	15
(Czechoslovakia) Braunová (Czechoslovakia) Šmídová	15	21	21	21
(Kingdom of Hungary) Mednyánszky (Kingdom of Hungary) Sipos	21	21	21
(Czechoslovakia) Pavlásková (Czechoslovakia) Zdobnická	15	19	12

Final
(Czechoslovakia) Braunová (Czechoslovakia) Šmídová	17	14	13
(Kingdom of Hungary) Mednyánszky (Kingdom of Hungary) Sipos	21	21	21

== See also ==
- List of World Table Tennis Championships medalists
