= 1952 World Table Tennis Championships – Women's team =

1952 Corbillon Cup (women's team)

The 1952 World Table Tennis Championships – Corbillon Cup (women's team) was the 12th edition of the women's team championship.

Japan won their first ever gold medal in the competition after finishing with a 6–0 match record. Romania claimed the silver medal and England won the bronze medal.

== Medalists ==
Event	Gold	Silver	Bronze
	Japan; Shizuki Narahara; Tomie Nishimura	Romania; Angelica Rozeanu; Sári Szász; Ella Zeller	England; Kathleen Best; Peggy Franks; Diane Rowe; Rosalind Rowe

== Final table ==
Pos	Team	P	W	L	F	A
1	Japan	6	6	0	18	5
2	Romania	6	4	2	16	9
3	England	6	4	2	13	9
4	Austria	6	3	3	12	10
4	Hungary	6	3	3	12	10
6	Hong Kong	6	1	5	5	17
7	India	6	0	6	2	18

Chile withdrew from the tournament

== See also ==
- List of World Table Tennis Championships medalists
