= 1954 World Table Tennis Championships – Men's doubles =

1954 Men's doubles

The 1954 World Table Tennis Championships men's doubles was the 21st edition of the men's doubles championship. Žarko Dolinar and Vilim Harangozo won the title after defeating Viktor Barna and Michel Haguenauer in the final by three sets to nil.

== Results ==
Round of 16
(Czechoslovakia) Ladislav Štípek (Czechoslovakia) Josef Posejpal	19	18	21	21	21
(West Germany) Conny Freundorfer (West Germany) Hans Rockmeier	21	21	14	16	17
(France) Jean-Claude Sala (France) Charles Dubouillé	18	13	16
(Socialist Federal Republic of Yugoslavia) Žarko Dolinar (Socialist Federal Republic of Yugoslavia) Vilim Harangozo	21	21	21
(England) Kenneth Craigie (England) Alan Rhodes	21	21	20	21
(England) Derek Burridge (England) Jackie Head	7	13	22	16
(Japan) Ichiro Ogimura (Japan) Yoshio Tomita	21	21	21
(France) René Roothooft (France) Michel Lanskoy	7	16	18
(Czechoslovakia) Adolf Šlár (Czechoslovakia) Václav Tereba	21	21	21
(Switzerland) Georges Wassmer (Switzerland) Hugo Urchetti	8	11	15
(England) Robert Griffin (England) Bryan Merrett	19	21	21	21
(England) Bernard Crouch (England) Peter Cruwys	21	19	15	14
(Brazil) Dagoberto Midosi (Brazil) Ivan Severo	22	13	24	21
(Japan) Kichiji Tamasu (Japan) Kazuo Kawai	20	21	22	14
(England) Viktor Barna (France) Michel Haguenauer	21	13	21	11	21
(England) Richard Bergmann (England) Johnny Leach	19	21	19	21	17

Quarterfinals
(Czechoslovakia) Stipek (Czechoslovakia) Posejpal	18	9	12
(Socialist Federal Republic of Yugoslavia) Dolinar (Socialist Federal Republic of Yugoslavia) Harangozo	21	21	21
(England) Craigie (England) Rhodes	8	4	12
(Japan) Ogimura (Japan) Tomita	21	21	21
(Czechoslovakia) Slar (Czechoslovakia) Tereba	21	21	21
(England) Griffin (England) Merrett	14	10	12
(Brazil) Midosi (Brazil) Severo	11	18	11
(England) Barna (France) Haguenauer	21	21	21

Semifinals
(Socialist Federal Republic of Yugoslavia) Dolinar (Socialist Federal Republic of Yugoslavia) Harangozo	21	21	21
(Japan) Ogimura (Japan) Tomita	17	16	15
(Czechoslovakia) Slar (Czechoslovakia) Tereba	19	21	16	18
(England) Barna (France) Haguenauer	21	9	21	21

Final
(Socialist Federal Republic of Yugoslavia) Dolinar (Socialist Federal Republic of Yugoslavia) Harangozo	21	21	21
(England) Barna (France) Haguenauer	15	11	10

== See also ==
List of World Table Tennis Championships medalists
