= 1952 World Table Tennis Championships – Women's doubles =

1952 Women's doubles

The 1952 World Table Tennis Championships women's doubles was the 18st edition of the women's doubles championship. Shizuki Narahara and Tomie Nishimura defeated Diane Rowe and Rosalind Rowe in the final by three sets to nil.

== Results ==
Round of 16
(England) Diane Rowe (England) Rosalind Rowe	22	21	21
(Australia) Mary Stafford (India) K. John	20	7	11
(Hong Kong) Yeung Wai-Bun (Hong Kong) Wong Bik-Yui	21	21	21
(Brazil) Torres Grazia (Austria) Gertrude Wutzl	14	13	15
(Austria) Gertrude Pritzi (Romania) Ella Zeller	21	21	17	21
(India) Sayeed Sultana (India) Vijaya Rajagopalan	12	14	21	11
bye
(Hungary) Gizi Farkas (Hungary) Edit Sági
(Scotland) Helen Elliot (Austria) Ermelinde Wertl	21	21	21
(India) A. Rukmani (India) Chaman Kapur	17	13	13
(England) Kathleen Best (England) Peggy Franks	21	21	21
(Hong Kong) Mok Woon-King (Hong Kong) Won Oi-Lan	17	9	19
(Japan) Tomie Nishimura (Japan) Shizuki Narahara	w/o
(Israel) Leipnik (Israel) Goldmann	scr
(India) Gool Nasikwala (India) Enid Bocarro	14	23	14	18
(Romania) Angelica Rozeanu (Romania) Sári Szász	21	21	21	21

Quarterfinals
(England) Rowe D (England) Rowe R	21	21	21
(Hong Kong) Yeung Wai-Bun (Hong Kong) Wong Bik-Yui	18	9	15
(Austria) Pritzi (Romania) Zeller	21	24	18	15	13
(Hungary) Farkas (Hungary) Sági	19	22	21	21	21
(Scotland) Elliot (Austria) Wertl	21	21	18	21
(England) Best (England) Franks	16	16	21	8
(Japan) Nishimura (Japan) Narahara	17	19	21	21	21
(Romania) Rozeanu (Romania) Szász	21	21	16	14	9

Semifinals
(England) Rowe D (England) Rowe R	16	21	21	21
(Hungary) Farkas (Hungary) Sági	21	18	14	15
(Scotland) Elliot (Austria) Wertl	16	16	22	19
(Japan) Nishimura (Japan) Narahara	21	21	20	21

Final
(England) Rowe D (England) Rowe R	11	7	20
(Japan) Nishimura (Japan) Narahara	21	21	22

== See also ==
List of World Table Tennis Championships medalists
