= 1954 World Table Tennis Championships – Women's doubles =

1954 Women's doubles

The 1954 World Table Tennis Championships women's doubles was the 20th edition of the women's doubles championship. Diane Rowe and Rosalind Rowe defeated Ann Haydon-Jones and Kathleen Best in the final by three sets to one.

== Results ==
Round of 16
(England) Diane Rowe (England) Rosalind Rowe	21	17	20	21	21
(Romania) Ella Zeller (England) Betty Isaacs	11	21	22	12	7
(Netherlands) Coby van Megen (Netherlands) Noortje van Megen	13	21	23	16	21
(Scotland) Ismene Cababe (Scotland) Helen Houliston	21	19	21	21	14
(Hungary) Agnes Almási (Hungary) Ilona Sólyom-Kerekes	20	17	19
(England) Joyce Seaman (England) Jean Winn	22	21	21
(Japan) Kiiko Watanabe (Japan) Fujie Eguchi	10	21	21	21
(Czechoslovakia) Libuše Grafková (Czechoslovakia) Eliška Krejčová	21	13	19	9
(England) Kathleen Best (England) Ann Haydon-Jones	21	16	19	21	21
(Scotland) Helen Elliot (United States) Leah Neuberger	12	21	21	14	16
(Wales) Shirley Jones (Wales) Vera Rowe	21	21	21
(Belgium) Ghislaine Roland (Belgium) Marie-Josee Schaal	17	11	11
(England) Pam Gall (England) Jill Rook	17	21	21	21
(England) Peggy Franks (England) Joyce Roberts	21	18	15	14
(Hungary) Éva Kóczián (Hungary) Gizella Simon	12	7	11
(Hungary) Gizi Farkas-Gervai (Romania) Angelica Rozeanu	21	21	21

Quarterfinals
(England) Rowe D (England) Rowe R	22	21	21
(Netherlands) van Megen (Netherlands) van Megen	20	17	19
(England) Seaman (England) Winn	21	13	19	9
(Japan) Watanabe (Japan) Eguchi	10	21	21	21
(England) Best (England) Haydon-Jones	21	21	21
(England) Jones (England) Rowe	17	16	4
(England) Gall (England) Rock	9	17	11
(Hungary) Farkas-Gervai (Romania) Rozeanu	21	21	21

Semifinals
(England) Rowe D (England) Rowe R	21	21	18	21
(Japan) Watanabe (Japan) Eguchi	7	11	21	18
(England) Best (England) Haydon-Jones	17	21	21	21	21
(Hungary) Farkas-Gervai (Romania) Rozeanu	21	23	18	17	10

Final
(England) Rowe D (England) Rowe R	19	21	21	22
(England) Best (England) Haydon-Jones	21	10	19	20

== See also ==
List of World Table Tennis Championships medalists
