= 1933 World Table Tennis Championships – Women's singles =

1933 Women's singles

The 1933 World Table Tennis Championships women's singles was the seventh edition of the women's singles championship. Anna Sipos defeated Mária Mednyánszky in the final by three sets to nil, to win the title.

== Results ==
Round of 16
(Hungary) Mária Mednyánszky | 21 | 21 | 21
(Austria) Anastasia Flussmann | 12 | 6 | 7
(Germany) Annemarie Schulz | 21 | 21 | 21
(Czechoslovakia) Jozka Veselska | 19 | 8 | 14
(Hungary) Magda Gál | 21 | 19 | 21 | 19 | 21
(Czechoslovakia) Marie Kettnerová | 17 | 21 | 19 | 21 | 16
(Austria) Gertrude Wildam | w/o
(Austria) Lili Forbath | 21 | 21 | 21
(Czechoslovakia) Marie Walterova | 12 | 16 | 19
(Germany) Astrid Krebsbach | 20 | 21 | 21 | 15 | 21
(Hungary) Emilné Rácz | 22 | 17 | 12 | 21 | 8
(Austria) Reisz | 16 | 21 | 9 | 12
(Hungary) Anna Sipos | 21 | 18 | 21 | 21
(Czechoslovakia) Marie Šmídová | 22 | 21 | 21
(Austria) Ladstätter | 20 | 16 | 17

Quarterfinals
(Hungary) Mednyánszky | 21 | 21 | 21
(Germany) Schulz | 10 | 13 | 16
(Hungary) Gál | 21 | 21 | 21
(Austria) Wildham | 11 | 15 | 15
(Austria) Forbath | 20 | 21 | 12 | 7
(Germany) Krebsbach | 22 | 15 | 21 | 21
(Hungary) Sipos | 21 | 21 | 21 | 21
(Czechoslovakia) Šmídová | 19 | 23 | 10 | 18

Semifinals
(Hungary) Mednyánszky | 21 | 21 | 21
(Hungary) Gál | 14 | 15 | 14
(Germany) Krebsbach | 16 | 21 | 21 | 20 | 18
(Hungary) Sipos | 21 | 17 | 5 | 22 | 21

Final
(Hungary) Mednyánszky | 20 | 16 | 15
(Hungary) Sipos | 22 | 21 | 21

== See also ==
List of World Table Tennis Championships medalists
