= 1952 World Table Tennis Championships – Women's singles =

1952 Women's singles

The 1952 World Table Tennis Championships women's singles was the 19th edition of the women's singles championship. Angelica Rozeanu defeated Gizi Farkas in the final by three sets to two, to win a third consecutive title.

== Results ==
Round of 16
(Romania) Angelica Rozeanu	21	21	21
(England) Kathleen Best	9	16	14
(Hungary) Edit Sági	19	14	21	9
(Scotland) Helen Elliot	21	21	19	21
(England) Rosalind Rowe	21	21	21
(India) Gool Nasikwala	15	16	12
(Austria) Gertrude Pritzi	21	21	21
(Hong Kong) Yeung Wai-Bun	11	11	13
(Austria) Ermelinde Wertl	17	23	21	21
(England) Peggy Franks	21	21	11	10
(Romania) Sári Szász-Kolozsvári	16	21	21	13	20+
(India) Sayeed Sultana	21	17	17	21	16+
(England) Diane Rowe	13	16	24	21	16
(Japan) Tomie Nishimura	21	21	24	9	21
(India) A. Rukmini	3	11	12
(Hungary) Gizi Farkas	21	21	21

Quarterfinals
(Romania) Rozeanu	21	21	21
(Scotland) Elliot	15	17	18
(England) Rowe	20	21	21	21
(Austria) Pritzi	22	19	18	17
(Austria) Wertl	21	21	16	21
(Romania) Szász	13	15	21	17
(Japan) Nishimura	21	14	16	18
(Hungary) Farkas	19	21	21	21

Semifinals
(Romania) Rozeanu	21	21	21
(England) Rowe	14	18	5
(Austria) Wertl	4	9	10
(Hungary) Farkas	21	21	21

Final
(Romania) Rozeanu	21	11	21	17	21
(Hungary) Farkas	17	21	18	21	14

+ Time limit rule applied

== See also ==
- List of World Table Tennis Championships medalists
