= 1933 World Table Tennis Championships – Women's doubles =

1933 Women's doubles

The 1933 World Table Tennis Championships women's doubles was the sixth edition of the women's doubles championship. Mária Mednyánszky and Anna Sipos defeated Emilné Rácz and Magda Gál in the final by three sets to one.

== Results ==
Round of 16
(Kingdom of Hungary) Mária Mednyánszky (Kingdom of Hungary) Anna Sipos
(Austria) von Benes (Austria) Ladstätter	w/o
(France) Yvonne Fayard (France) Marguerite de Tenaud	scr
(Czechoslovakia) Marie Walterová (Czechoslovakia) Jožka Veselská	w/o
(Germany) Nitschmann (England) Daphne Roberts	scr
(Austria) Anastasia Flussmann (Austria) Reisz
bye
(Kingdom of Hungary) Emilné Rácz (Kingdom of Hungary) Magda Gál	22	18	18	21	21
(Czechoslovakia) Marie Šmídová (Czechoslovakia) Marie Kettnerová	20	21	21	17	15
(Austria) Gertrude Wildam (Austria) Lili Forbath
(Germany) Annemarie Schulz (Germany) Anita Felguth

Quarterfinals
(Kingdom of Hungary) Mednyánszky (Kingdom of Hungary) Sipos	w/o
(Austria) von Benes (Austria) Ladstätter	scr
(Czechoslovakia) Walterová (Czechoslovakia) Veselská	w/o
(Austria) Flussmann (Austria) Reisz	8	9	15
(Kingdom of Hungary) Rácz (Kingdom of Hungary) Gál	21	21	21
(Austria) Wildam (Austria) Forbath	19	21	18	17
(Germany) Schulz (Germany) Felguth	21	17	21	21

Semifinals
(Kingdom of Hungary) Mednyánszky (Kingdom of Hungary) Sipos	21	21	21
(Czechoslovakia) Walterová (Czechoslovakia) Veselská	11	11	12
(Kingdom of Hungary) Rácz (Kingdom of Hungary) Gál	23	19	21	21
(Germany) Schulz (Germany) Felguth	21	21	11	19

Final
(Kingdom of Hungary) Mednyánszky (Kingdom of Hungary) Sipos	21	21	21	21
(Kingdom of Hungary) Rácz (Kingdom of Hungary) Gál	18	23	17	14

== See also ==
List of World Table Tennis Championships medalists
