= 1932 World Table Tennis Championships – Women's singles =

1932 Women's singles

The 1932 World Table Tennis Championships women's singles was the sixth edition of the women's singles championship. Anna Sipos defeated Mária Mednyánszky in the final by three sets to nil, to win the title.

== Draw ==
=== Key ===
- Q = Qualifier
- w/o = Walkover
- w/d = Withdraw
- r = Retired
- DQ = Disqualified

=== Finals ===
Round of 16
(Kingdom of Hungary) Anna Sipos	21	2	24	18	21
(Weimar Republic) Annemarie Haensch	10	21	22	21	13
(Czechoslovakia) Ambropsiova	21	21	11	19	7
(Austria) Gertrude Wildam	12	18	21	21	21
(Weimar Republic) Mona Müller-Rüster	21	21	21
(Czechoslovakia) Beznoskova	9	13	16
(Czechoslovakia) Anna Braunova	14	20	15
(Kingdom of Hungary) Magda Gál	21	22	21
(Czechoslovakia) Marie Šmídová	21	23	21
(Weimar Republic) Anita Felguth-Denker	18	13	8
(Czechoslovakia) Jozka Veselska	21	18	12	10
(Czechoslovakia) Mayerova	14	21	21	21
(Czechoslovakia) Berta Zdobnicka	21	11	21	21
(Czechoslovakia) Stapferova	10	21	19	11
(Czechoslovakia) Marie Kettnerová	18	7	11
(Kingdom of Hungary) Mária Mednyánszky	21	21	21

Quarterfinals
(Kingdom of Hungary) Anna Sipos	21	21	21
(Austria) Gertrude Wildam	18	17	4
(Weimar Republic) Mona Müller-Rüster	21	18	9	24	11
(Kingdom of Hungary) Magda Gál	13	21	21	22	21
(Czechoslovakia) Marie Šmídová	21	21	21
(Czechoslovakia) Mayerova	16	17	16
(Czechoslovakia) Berta Zdobnicka	7	10	15
(Kingdom of Hungary) Mária Mednyánszky	21	21	21

Semifinals
(Kingdom of Hungary) Anna Sipos	21	21	21
(Kingdom of Hungary) Magda Gál	10	18	11
(Czechoslovakia) Marie Šmídová	13	21	16	16
(Kingdom of Hungary) Mária Mednyánszky	21	11	21	21

Final
(Kingdom of Hungary) Anna Sipos	21	21	21
(Kingdom of Hungary) Mária Mednyánszky	17	16	19

== See also ==
List of World Table Tennis Championships medalists
