= 1952 World Table Tennis Championships – Men's singles =

1952 Men's singles

The 1952 World Table Tennis Championships men's singles was the 19th edition of the men's singles championship, held in Bombay, India.

Hiroji Satoh defeated József Kóczián in the final, winning three sets to nil to secure the title.

== Results ==
Round of 16
(England) Johnny Leach	13	21	9	15
(France) Guy Amouretti	21	10	21	21
(United States) Douglas Cartland	18	13	21	21	21
(South Vietnam) Nai Van Hoa	21	21	13	16	14
(Hungary) József Kóczián	13	21	13	21	21
(Hong Kong) Suh Sui Cho	21	18	21	5	15
(France) Michel Lanskoy	21	21	17	21
(India) Thangavelu Thiruvengadam	15	9	21	16
(Hungary) Ferenc Sidó	21	21	21
(Hong Kong) Fu Chi Fong	19	16	14
(Japan) Hiroji Satoh	21	21	21
(South Vietnam) Tran Van Lieu	8	5	11
(France) René Roothooft	18	21	22	21
(Japan) Norikazu Fujii	21	17	20	17
(Portugal) Paul Rosa Duque	21	20	21	21
(Hong Kong) Keung Wing Ning	18	22	18	16

Quarterfinals
(France) Amouretti	21	21	21
(United States) Cartland	19	9	13
(Hungary) Kóczián	21	21	21
(France) Lanskoy	18	18	12
(Hungary) Sidó	21	20	4	13
(Japan) Satoh	19	22	21	21
(France) Roothooft	21	21	21
(Portugal) Duque	16	12	9

Semifinals
(France) Amouretti	19	14	10
(Hungary) Kóczián	21	21	21
(Japan) Satoh	21	21	21
(France) Roothooft	19	15	19

Final
(Hungary) Kóczián	19	17	14
(Japan) Satoh	21	21	21

== See also ==
List of World Table Tennis Championships medalists
