= 1934 World Table Tennis Championships – Men's team =

1934 Swaythling Cup (men's team)

The 1934 World Table Tennis Championships – Swaythling Cup (men's team) was the eighth edition of the men's team championship. The Championships were held in December 1933 but are officially listed as the 1934 Championships.

Hungary dominated the tournament once again and won the gold medal with a perfect 11–0 match record. Austria and Czechoslovakia tied for silver and therefore no bronze was awarded.

== Swaythling Cup final table ==
Pos	Team	P	W	L	Squad
1	Hungary	11	11	0	Viktor Barna, Laszlo Bellak, Lajos Dávid, Tibor Házi, Miklós Szabados
2	Czechoslovakia	11	9	2	Oldrich Blecha, Miloslav Hamr, Erwin Koln-Korda, Stanislav Kolář, Karel Svoboda
2	Austria	11	9	2	Erwin Kohn, Alfred Liebster, Karl Schediwy
4	Poland	11	8	3	Alojzy Ehrlich, Hillel Pohoryles, Simon Pohoryles
5	France	11	7	4	Henri Bolleli, Charles Dubouillé, Daniel Guérin, Michel Haguenauer, Raymond Verger
5	Latvia	11	7	4	Mordecai Finberg, Arnold Oschin, E. Zebba
7	England	11	4	7	Eric Findon, Don Foulis, Herbert 'Willie' Hales, Ken Hyde, Andrew Millar
7	India	11	4	7	Mohammed Ayub, Jimmy Dass, Wishnu Kirloskar
7	(Socialist Federal Republic of Yugoslavia) Yugoslavia	11	4	7	Borivoj Građanski, Ladislav Hexner, Stevica Maksimović, Ludovik Nemec, Otto Weissbacher
10	Switzerland	11	2	9	S. Daguet, Glatz, Hector Michel, Pissera, Pierre Vergain
11	Belgium	11	1	10	Jacques Bonnaventure, Jules Carton, Pierre Chapel, Robert Eymael, Laurent Moonens
12	Netherlands	11	0	11	Hans Cserno, Henk Kappelhoff, Lo Lissauer, Neep

== See also ==
List of World Table Tennis Championships medalists
