= 1932 World Table Tennis Championships =

The 6th World Table Tennis Championships were held in Prague from 25 to 30 January 1932.

== Medalists ==
=== Team ===
Event	Gold	Silver	Bronze
Swaythling Cup; Men's team	Czechoslovakia; Michael Grobauer; Stanislav Kolář; Jindřich Lauterbach; Antonín Maleček; Bedřich Nikodém	Hungary; Viktor Barna; Laszlo Bellak; Lajos Dávid; István Kelen; Miklós Szabados	Austria; Manfred Feher; Paul Flussmann; Erwin Kohn; Alfred Liebster; Robert Thum

=== Individual ===
Event	Gold	Silver	Bronze
Men's singles	(Kingdom of Hungary) Viktor Barna	(Kingdom of Hungary) Miklós Szabados	(Kingdom of Hungary) István Boros
Men's singles	(Kingdom of Hungary) Viktor Barna	(Kingdom of Hungary) Miklós Szabados	(Austria) Erwin Kohn
Women's singles	(Kingdom of Hungary) Anna Sipos	(Kingdom of Hungary) Mária Mednyánszky	(Kingdom of Hungary) Magda Gál
Women's singles	(Kingdom of Hungary) Anna Sipos	(Kingdom of Hungary) Mária Mednyánszky	(Czechoslovakia) Marie Šmídová
Men's Doubles	(Kingdom of Hungary) Viktor Barna (Kingdom of Hungary) Miklós Szabados	(Kingdom of Hungary) Laszlo Bellak (Kingdom of Hungary) Sándor Glancz	(England) Charles Bull (England) David Jones
Men's Doubles	(Kingdom of Hungary) Viktor Barna (Kingdom of Hungary) Miklós Szabados	(Kingdom of Hungary) Laszlo Bellak (Kingdom of Hungary) Sándor Glancz	(Kingdom of Hungary) István Boros (Kingdom of Hungary) Tibor Házi
Women's Doubles	(Kingdom of Hungary) Mária Mednyánszky (Kingdom of Hungary) Anna Sipos	(Czechoslovakia) Anna Braunova (Czechoslovakia) Marie Šmídová	(Czechoslovakia) Vera Pavlaskova (Czechoslovakia) Berta Zdobnicka
Women's Doubles	(Kingdom of Hungary) Mária Mednyánszky (Kingdom of Hungary) Anna Sipos	(Czechoslovakia) Anna Braunova (Czechoslovakia) Marie Šmídová	(Weimar Republic) Anita Felguth-Denker (Kingdom of Hungary) Magda Gál
Mixed Doubles	(Kingdom of Hungary) Viktor Barna (Kingdom of Hungary) Anna Sipos	(Kingdom of Hungary) Miklós Szabados (Kingdom of Hungary) Mária Mednyánszky	(Czechoslovakia) Jaroslav Jílek (Czechoslovakia) Marie Šmídová
Mixed Doubles	(Kingdom of Hungary) Viktor Barna (Kingdom of Hungary) Anna Sipos	(Kingdom of Hungary) Miklós Szabados (Kingdom of Hungary) Mária Mednyánszky	(Kingdom of Hungary) Sándor Glancz (Kingdom of Hungary) Magda Gál
