= Herbert 'Willie' Hales =

English table tennis player

Personal information
- Nationality: England

Herbert J 'Willie' Hales was a male English international table tennis player.

== Table tennis career ==
He represented England during the 1934 World Table Tennis Championships in the Swaythling Cup (men's team event) with Eric Findon, Don Foulis, Ken Hyde and Andrew Millar.

== See also ==
- List of England players at the World Team Table Tennis Championships
