= Don Foulis =

English table tennis player

Personal information
- Nationality: England
- Born: 13 December 1908; Ecclesall Bierlow, England
- Died: 14 March 1989 (aged 80); Southampton, England

Donald Muller Foulis (13 December 1908 – 14 March 1989) was a male English international table tennis player.

== Table tennis career ==
He was selected to represent England during the 1934 World Table Tennis Championships in the Swaythling Cup. The other team members were Eric Findon, Herbert 'Willie' Hales, Ken Hyde and Andrew Millar and they finished in seventh place.

He represented Liverpool at club level and won five men's singles titles at the Liverpool & District Table Tennis League.

== See also ==
- List of England players at the World Team Table Tennis Championships
