= Kenneth Craigie =

English table tennis player

Personal information
- Nationality: England
- Born: 15 April 1924 Lambeth, London, England
- Died: 8 November 2003 (aged 79) Richmond, Surrey, England
Medal record
Representing England
World Table Tennis Championships
Bronze medal – third place	1954	Men's Team

Kenneth Ronald Craigie (15 April 1924 – 8 November 2003), better known as Ken Craigie, was an English international table tennis player.

== Table tennis career ==
Craigie won a bronze medal at the 1954 World Table Tennis Championships in the Swaythling Cup (men's team) event with Richard Bergmann, Johnny Leach, Aubrey Simons and Harry Venner for England.

He coached the twin sisters Diane Rowe and Rosalind Rowe at the West Ealing Table Tennis Club.

== Personal life and death ==
Craigie was born in Lambeth, London on 15 April 1924. He died after a long illness in Richmond, Surrey on 8 November 2003, at the age of 79.

== See also ==
- List of England players at the World Team Table Tennis Championships
- List of World Table Tennis Championships medalists
