= Jaroslav Jílek =

Jaroslav Jílek may refer to:

- Jaroslav Jílek (javelin thrower) (born 1989), Czech javelin thrower
- Jaroslav Jílek (table tennis), Czech table tennis player
