= Daisuke Daimon =

Japanese table tennis player

Personal information
- Nationality: Japan
Medal record
Representing Japan
World Championships
Bronze medal – third place	1952	Men's Team

Daisuke Daimon was a male international table tennis player from Japan.

== Table tennis career ==
He won a bronze medal at the 1952 World Table Tennis Championships in the Swaythling Cup (men's team event) when representing Japan. The team consisted of Norikazu Fujii, Tadaaki Hayashi and Hiroji Satoh. He was the non-playing captain of the team. He was the Secretary-Coach of the Japanese teams.

== See also ==
- List of table tennis players
- List of World Table Tennis Championships medalists
