= Eric Findon =

British table tennis player (1913–1941)

Personal information
- Nationality: England
- Born: 2 March 1913 Paddington, London, England
- Died: 25 August 1941 (aged 28) Belgium

Eric Charles Findon (2 March 1913 – 25 August 1941) was a male English international table tennis player and actor.

== Table tennis career ==
He was selected to represent England during the 1934 World Table Tennis Championships in the Swaythling Cup. The other team members were Don Foulis, Herbert 'Willie' Hales, Ken Hyde and Andrew Millar and they finished in seventh place.

The Spalding 'Eric Findon Autograph' table tennis bat was named after him. He was the owner and editor of 'The Table Tennis World' magazine in 1931.

== Acting career ==
He appeared as a teenager in two feature films called The Rising Generation (1928) and Cupid in Clover (1929).

== Death ==
He was killed in action during World War II in Wavre, Walloon Brabant, serving with the 78 Squadron, Royal Air Force Volunteer Reserve.

== See also ==
- List of England players at the World Team Table Tennis Championships
