= Alec Brook =

British table tennis player

Personal information
- Nationality: England
- Born: 1911
- Died: 6 November 1986 (aged 74–75)
Medal record
Representing England
World Table Tennis Championships
Bronze medal – third place	1933	Men's Team

Alec Brook (1911–1986) was a male English international table tennis player.

== Table tennis career ==
He won a bronze medal in the 1933 World Table Tennis Championships in the Swaythling Cup (men's team event) with Adrian Haydon, David Jones, Andrew Millar and Edward Rimer for England.

He appeared 500 times in exhibition matches at the London Palladium with Viktor Barna.

== Personal profile ==
He was a chairman of the sports company Motif tie manufacturers ADB London Ltd which he established in 1946. He died in 1986.

== See also ==
- List of England players at the World Team Table Tennis Championships
- List of World Table Tennis Championships medalists
