= 1954 World Table Tennis Championships – Men's singles =

1954 Men's singles

The 1954 World Table Tennis Championships men's singles was the 21st edition of the men's singles championship.

Ichiro Ogimura defeated Tage Flisberg in the final, winning three sets to one to secure the title.

== Results ==
Round of 16
(England) Richard Bergmann	21	21	20	17	21
(Hungary) Elemér Gyetvai	10	17	22	21	18
(Japan) Yoshio Tomita	21	21	17	21
(England) J.Peter Shead	17	13	21	15
(Sweden) Tage Flisberg	9	17	21	21	21
(Czechoslovakia) Ladislav Štípek	21	21	17	16	12
(France) René Roothooft	21+	21	17+
(Hungary) László Földy	20	9	14
(Czechoslovakia) Ivan Andreadis	21	22	21
(Austria) Heribert Just	15	20	18
(Romania) Toma Reiter	12	21	21	21
(Japan) Kichiji Tamasu	21	13	16	19
(United States) Bernard Bukiet	16	21	21	14	21
(Socialist Federal Republic of Yugoslavia) Josip Gabric	21	17	19	21	17
(Japan) Ichiro Ogimura	21	21	21
(Hungary) Ferenc Sidó	18	11	13

Quarterfinals
(England) Bergmann	21	22	20	21
(Japan) Tomita	13	20	22	16
(Sweden) Flisberg	21	21	20	21
(France) Roothooft	18	18	22	14
(Czechoslovakia) Andreadis	21	19	21	21
(Romania) Reiter	16	21	11	10
(United States) Bukiet	11	21	12	12
(Japan) Ogimura	21	16	21	21

Semifinals
(England) Bergmann	21	16	21	21
(Sweden) Flisberg	19	21	17	13
(Czechoslovakia) Andreadis	19	12	21	22
(Japan) Ogimura	21	21	18	24

Final
(Sweden) Flisberg	7	12	21	10
(Japan) Ogimura	21	21	18	21

+ Time limit rules applies

== See also ==
List of World Table Tennis Championships medalists
