= Cheng Kwok Wing =

Hong Kong table tennis player

Personal information
- Nationality: Hong Kong
Medal record
Representing Hong Kong
World Championships
Bronze medal – third place	1952	Men's Team

Cheng Kwok Wing was an international table tennis player from Hong Kong.

== Table tennis career ==
Cheng won a bronze medal at the 1952 World Table Tennis Championships in the Swaythling Cup (men's team event) when representing Hong Kong. The team consisted of Chung Chin Sing, Keung Wing Ning, Fu Chi Fong and Suh Sui Cho.

== See also ==
- List of table tennis players
- List of World Table Tennis Championships medalists
