= Michael Grobauer =

Czech table tennis player

Personal information
- Nationality: Czechoslovakia
Medal record
Representing Czechoslovakia
World Table Tennis Championships
Gold medal – first place	1932	Men's Team

Michael Grobauer was a male Czech international table tennis player.

== Table tennis career ==
He won a gold medal at the 1932 World Table Tennis Championships in the team event for Czechoslovakia.

== See also ==
- List of table tennis players
- List of World Table Tennis Championships medalists
