= Hideko Goto =

Japanese table tennis player

Personal information
- Nationality: Japan
Medal record
Representing Japan
World Table Tennis Championships
Gold medal – first place	1954	Women's Team

Hideko Goto (後藤 英子, Gotō Hideko) is a former international table tennis player from Japan.

== Table tennis career ==
She won a gold medal at the 1954 World Table Tennis Championships in the Corbillon Cup with Fujie Eguchi, Yoshiko Tanaka and Kiiko Watanabe.

== See also ==
- List of table tennis players
- List of World Table Tennis Championships medalists
