= Milan Antolković =

Croatian footballer

Personal information
- Date of birth: 27 September 1915
- Place of birth: Zagreb, Kingdom of Croatia-Slavonia, Austria-Hungary
- Date of death: 27 June 2007 (aged 91)
- Place of death: Zagreb, Croatia
- Position: Forward

Youth career
- 1929–32: Maksimir

Senior career*
Years	Team	Apps	(Gls)
1931–1932	Građanski Zagreb		
1933	Bata Borovo		
1934–1945	Građanski Zagreb		
1945	Dinamo Zagreb		

International career
1937–1939	Yugoslavia	8	(1)
1940	Banovina of Croatia	1	(0)
1941–1943	Independent State of Croatia	9	(3)

Managerial career
- 1948–1952: Jedinstvo Zagreb
- 1952–1953: Dinamo Zagreb
- 1956–1957: Dinamo Zagreb
- 1959–1960: Dinamo Zagreb
- 1961–1964: Dinamo Zagreb
- 1963: NK Zagreb
- 1965: Dinamo Zagreb
- 1965–1966: Yugoslavia
- 1966–1969: SW Bregenz
- 1969–1970: SC Tasmania 1900 Berlin
- 1970–1971: SW Bregenz
- 1972–1973: Osijek
- * Club domestic league appearances and goals

Milan Antolković (Croatian pronunciation: [mǐlan antǒːlkoʋitɕ]; 27 September 1915 – 27 June 2007) was a Croatian and Yugoslav football player and manager. Antolković spent most of his playing career with his hometown club Građanski Zagreb in the 1930s and 1940s, with whom he won two Yugoslav championships (1936–37 and 1939–40).

He was capped eight times for Yugoslavia (1937–39). During World War II he also played for the wartime Independent State of Croatia team (1941–43) and won another national title in 1943.

After the war, he became closely involved with Dinamo Zagreb, where he had five managing spells in the period from 1952 to 1965. With Dinamo he won two Marshal Tito Cups (1960, 1963) and reached the 1963 Inter-Cities Fairs Cup final. He later had managing spells at the Austrian club Schwarz-Weiß Bregenz, German club SC Tasmania 1900 Berlin, and back in Yugoslavia at second-tier club NK Osijek, before retiring in 1973.

== Football career ==
=== Player ===
He began his career with NK Maksimir before moving to Građanski Zagreb in 1932. He also had a short spell with SK Bata Borovo in 1933. He played with Građanski as a striker until its disbanding in 1945.

During his international career with the Kingdom of Yugoslavia he was capped 8 times, scoring one goal. During the existence of the Independent State of Croatia he was capped for the Croatia national team 10 times, scoring three goals.

=== Managerial ===
He was later a manager. His most famous managerial work may have been with Dinamo Zagreb with whom he won the Yugoslav Cup in 1960 and took to the Inter-Cities Fairs Cup finals in 1963. He won the Franjo Bučar State Award for Sport in 2003. He also coached SW Bregenz and SC Tasmania 1900 Berlin.

== Table tennis career ==
He played for the Yugoslav national table tennis team during the 1933 Swaythling Cup.

== External sources ==
- Milan Antolković at National-Football-Teams.com
- Milan Antolković at Reprezentacija.rs (in Serbian)
