= Pamela Mortimer =

British table tennis player

Personal information
- Nationality: England
- Born: 1932; Birmingham, England
- Died: 2016

Frances 'Pamela' Mortimer (1932–2016) was a female international table tennis player from England.

== Table tennis career ==
She represented England at the 1959 World Table Tennis Championships in the Corbillon Cup (women's team event) with Ann Haydon, Diane Rowe and Kathleen Best.

== Personal life ==
She married Alan Lake in 1956 and died in 2016.

== See also ==
- List of England players at the World Team Table Tennis Championships
