= Edward Rimer =

British table tennis player

Personal information
- Nationality: England
- Born: 5 April 1910 Sunderland, England
- Died: December 1987 (aged 76) Weymouth, England
Medal record
Representing England
World Table Tennis Championships
Bronze medal – third place	1933	Men's Team

Edward Simpson Rimer (5 April 1910 – December 1987) was an English international table tennis player.

== Table tennis career ==
He won a bronze medal in the 1933 World Table Tennis Championships in the Swaythling Cup (men's team event) with Adrian Haydon, David Jones, Andrew Millar and Alec Brook for England.

== See also ==
- List of England players at the World Team Table Tennis Championships
- List of World Table Tennis Championships medalists
