= Jaroslav Jílek (table tennis) =

Czech table tennis player

Personal information
- Nationality: Czechoslovakia
Medal record
Representing Czechoslovakia
World Table Tennis Championships
Bronze medal – third place	1932	Mixed Doubles

Jaroslav Jílek is a male former international table tennis player from Czechoslovakia.

He won a bronze medal at the 1932 World Table Tennis Championships in the mixed doubles with Marie Šmídová.

== See also ==
- List of table tennis players
- List of World Table Tennis Championships medalists
