= Chung Chin Sing =

Hong Kong table tennis player

Personal information
- Nationality: Hong Kong
Medal record
Representing Hong Kong
World Championships
Bronze medal – third place	1952	Men's Team

Chung Chin Sing was a male international table tennis player from Hong Kong.

== Table tennis career ==
He won a bronze medal at the 1952 World Table Tennis Championships in the Swaythling Cup (men's team event) when representing Hong Kong. The team consisted of Cheng Kwok Wing, Keung Wing Ning, Fu Chi Fong and Suh Sui Cho.

He also won a bronze in 1952 during the Asian Table Tennis Championships.

== See also ==
- List of table tennis players
- List of World Table Tennis Championships medalists
