= Kazuo Kawai =

Japanese table tennis player

Personal information
- Nationality: Japan
Medal record
Representing Japan
World Table Tennis Championships
Gold medal – first place	1954	Men's team

Kazuo Kawai (川井 一男, Kawai Kazuo) is a former international table tennis player from Japan.

He won a gold medal at the 1954 World Table Tennis Championships in the Swaythling Cup (men's team event) with Ichiro Ogimura, Kichiji Tamasu, and Yoshio Tomita.

== See also ==
- List of table tennis players
- List of World Table Tennis Championships medalists
