= Anna Braunová =

Czechoslovak table tennis player

Personal information
- Nationality: Czechoslovakia
Medal record
Representing Czechoslovakia
World Table Tennis Championships
| Silver medal – second place | 1932 | Women's doubles |

Anna Braunová was a female international table tennis player from Czechoslovakia.

She won a silver medal at the 1932 World Table Tennis Championships in the women's doubles with Marie Šmídová.

== See also ==
- List of table tennis players
- List of World Table Tennis Championships medalists
