= Marie Walterová =

Czech table tennis player

Personal information
- Nationality: Czechoslovakia
Medal record
Representing Czechoslovakia
World Table Tennis Championships
Bronze medal – third place	1933	Women's doubles

Marie Walterová was a Czech table tennis player who represented Czechoslovakia.

She won a bronze medal at the 1933 World Table Tennis Championships in the women's doubles with Jožka Veselská.

== See also ==
- List of table tennis players
- List of World Table Tennis Championships medalists
