= Berta Zdobnická =

Czechoslovak table tennis player

Personal information
- Nationality: Czechoslovakia
Medal record
Representing Czechoslovakia
World Table Tennis Championships
Bronze medal – third place	1932	Women's doubles

Berta Zdobnická was a female international table tennis player from Czechoslovakia.

She won a bronze medal at the 1932 World Table Tennis Championships in the women's doubles with Vera Pavlaskova.

== See also ==
- List of table tennis players
- List of World Table Tennis Championships medalists
