= Keung Wing Ning =

Hong Kong table tennis player

Personal information
- Nationality: Hong Kong
Medal record
Representing Hong Kong
World Championships
Bronze medal – third place	1952	Men's Team

Keung Wing Ning (1927 – 16 May 1968) was a male international table tennis player from Hong Kong.

== Table tennis career ==
He won a bronze medal at the 1952 World Table Tennis Championships in the Swaythling Cup (men's team event) when representing Hong Kong. The team consisted of Cheng Kwok Wing, Chung Chin Sing, Fu Chi Fong and Suh Sui Cho. He also reached the fourth round of the singles.

== See also ==
- List of table tennis players
- List of World Table Tennis Championships medalists
