= Josef Posejpal =

Czechoslovak table tennis player

Personal information
- Nationality: Czechoslovakia
- Born: 19 March 1935 (age 91) Prague, Czechoslovakia
Medal record
Representing Czechoslovakia
World Table Tennis Championships
Silver medal – second place	1954	Men's team

Josef Posejpal (born 19 March 1935) is a former male international table tennis player from Czechoslovakia.

== Personal life ==
Posejpak was born on born 19 March 1935 in Prague. He was a store-keeper with the Baraba Tunnel Construction national enterprise.

== Career ==
He won a silver medal at the 1954 World Table Tennis Championships in the Swaythling Cup (men's team event) with Ivan Andreadis, Adolf Šlár, Ladislav Štípek and Václav Tereba.

== See also ==
- List of table tennis players
- List of World Table Tennis Championships medalists
