= Erwin Koln-Korda =

Czech table tennis player

Erwin Koln (Korda)
Personal information
- Nationality: Czechoslovakia
Medal record
Men's table tennis
Representing Czechoslovakia
World Championships
Silver medal – second place	1933	Team
Bronze medal – third place	1934	Doubles
Silver medal – second place	1934	Team

Erwin Koln (Korda) was a male international table tennis player who represented Czechoslovakia.

== Table tennis career ==
He won a bronze medal at the 1934 World Table Tennis Championships in the men's doubles with Miloslav Hamr. He also won two silver medals in the Swaythling Cup (men's team events) in 1933 and 1934.

He was from Eastern Slovakia.

== See also ==
- World Table Tennis Championships
- List of table tennis players
- List of World Table Tennis Championships medalists
