= Tomie Nishimura =

Japanese table tennis player

Personal information
- Full name: Nishimura Tomie
- Nationality: Japan
- Born: 1933 (age 92–93)

Sport
- Sport: Table tennis
Medal record
Women's table tennis
Representing Japan
World Championships
Gold medal – first place	1952 Bombay	Doubles
Gold medal – first place	1952 Bombay	Team

Tomie Nishimura is a former international table tennis player from Japan.

== Table tennis career ==
In 1952 she won two gold medals in women's doubles with Shizuka Narahara and the women's team events in the 1952 World Table Tennis Championships.

== See also ==
- List of table tennis players
- List of World Table Tennis Championships medalists
