= Sándor Glancz =

Hungarian table tennis player

Personal information
- Full name: GLANCZ Sándor
- Nationality: Hungary
- Born: 14 July 1908
- Died: 17 January 1974 (aged 65)

Sport
- Sport: Table tennis
Medal record
Men's table tennis
Representing Hungary
World Championships
Silver medal – second place	1934 Paris	Doubles
Bronze medal – third place	1933 Baden	Singles
Gold medal – first place	1933 Baden	Doubles
Silver medal – second place	1933 Baden	Mixed Doubles
Gold medal – first place	1933 Baden	Team
Silver medal – second place	1932 Prague	Doubles
Bronze medal – third place	1932 Prague	Mixed Doubles
Bronze medal – third place	1931 Budapest	Mixed Doubles
Bronze medal – third place	1930 Berlin	Doubles
Bronze medal – third place	1930 Berlin	Mixed Doubles
Silver medal – second place	1929 Budapest	Doubles
Gold medal – first place	1929 Budapest	Team
Bronze medal – third place	1928 Stockholm	Doubles
Gold medal – first place	1928 Stockholm	Team

Sándor Glancz (14 July 1908 in Budapest – 17 January 1974 in New York City) was a male international table tennis player from Hungary.

== Table tennis career ==
From 1928 to 1934 he won several medals in singles, doubles, and team events in the Table Tennis European Championships.

His fourteen World Championship medals included four gold medals; one in the doubles at the 1933 World Table Tennis Championships with Viktor Barna and three in the team event. He also won four English Open titles.

== See also ==
- List of table tennis players
- List of World Table Tennis Championships medalists
