= Emilné Rácz =

Hungarian table tennis player

Personal information
- Nationality: Hungary
Medal record
Representing Hungary
World Table Tennis Championships
Silver medal – second place	1933	Women's doubles

Emilné Rácz was a female Hungarian international table tennis player.

== Table tennis career ==
She won a silver medal at the 1933 World Table Tennis Championships in the women's doubles with Magda Gál.

== See also ==
- List of table tennis players
- List of World Table Tennis Championships medalists
