= Oldřich Blecha =

Czech table tennis player

Personal information
- Nationality: Czechoslovakia
Medal record
Men's table tennis
Representing Czechoslovakia
World Championships
Silver medal – second place	1933	Team
Silver medal – second place	1934	Team

Oldřich Blecha was a Czech international table tennis player.

== Table tennis career ==
Blecha won two silver medals at the 1933 and 1934 World Table Tennis Championships in the Swaythling Cup (men's team event).

== See also ==
- World Table Tennis Championships
- List of table tennis players
- List of World Table Tennis Championships medalists
