= Jožka Veselská =

Czech table tennis player

Jozka Veselska
Personal information
- Nationality: Czechoslovakia
Medal record
Representing Czechoslovakia
World Table Tennis Championships
Bronze medal – third place	1933	Women's doubles
Bronze medal – third place	1934	Women's team

Jožka Veselská was a Czech table tennis player who represented Czechoslovakia.

She won two bronze medals; one at the 1933 World Table Tennis Championships in the women's doubles with Marie Walterová. and one in the women's team event at the 1934 World Table Tennis Championships.

== See also ==
- List of table tennis players
- List of World Table Tennis Championships medalists
