= Norikazu Fujii =

Japanese table tennis player

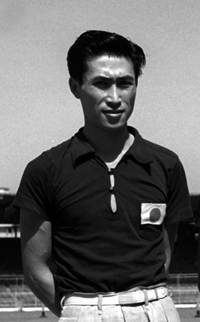

Personal information
- Nationality: Japan
- Born: 1925
- Died: 16 November 1992 (aged 66–67)
Medal record
Representing Japan
World Table Tennis Championships
Bronze medal – third place	1952	Men's Team
Gold medal – first place	1952	Men's Doubles

Norikazu Fujii (藤井 則和, Fujii Norikazu) was a former Japanese international table tennis player.

== Table tennis career ==
Fujii won a gold medal in the doubles with Tadaaki Hayashi at the 1952 World Table Tennis Championships .

He also won a bronze medal in the men's team event at the 1952 World Table Tennis Championships with Daisuke Daimon, Tadaaki Hayashi and Hiroji Satoh.

He later became a coach and earned the nickname 'Cannonball'.

== See also ==
- List of table tennis players
- List of World Table Tennis Championships medalists
