= Shizuka Narahara =

Japanese table tennis player (born 1928)

Personal information
- Full name: Narahara Shizuka
- Nationality: Japan
- Born: 6 May 1928 Hiroshima, Japan

Sport
- Sport: Table tennis
Medal record
Women's table tennis
Representing Japan
World Championships
Bronze medal – third place	1955 Utrecht	Mixed
Bronze medal – third place	1955 Utrecht	Doubles
Silver medal – second place	1955 Utrecht	Team
Gold medal – first place	1952 Bombay	Doubles
Gold medal – first place	1952 Bombay	Team

Shizuka Narahara (楢原 静, Narahara Shizuka; born 6 May 1928) is a Japanese former table tennis player. From Hiroshima, she was in the city on 6 August 1945, when the first of two atomic bombs was dropped on Japan.

== Table tennis career ==
From 1952 to 1955 she won five medals in doubles and team events in the World Table Tennis Championships.

The five World Championship medals included two gold medals in the doubles with Tomie Nishimura at the 1952 World Table Tennis Championships and the team event also at the 1952 World Table Tennis Championships.

== See also ==
- List of table tennis players
- List of World Table Tennis Championships medalists
