= Tadaaki Hayashi =

Japanese table tennis player

Personal information
- Nationality: Japan
- Born: 2 January 1920
- Died: 29 August 2017 (aged 97)
Medal record
Representing Japan
World Table Tennis Championships
| Bronze medal – third place | 1952 | Men's Team |
| Gold medal – first place | 1952 | Men's Doubles |

Tadaaki Hayashi (林 忠明, Hayashi Tadaaki) was a Japanese international table tennis player.

== Table tennis career ==
Hayashi won a gold medal in the doubles with Norikazu Fujii at the 1952 World Table Tennis Championships .

He also won a bronze medal in the men's team event at the 1952 World Table Tennis Championships.

== See also ==
- List of table tennis players
- List of World Table Tennis Championships medalists
