= Ilona Kerekes =

Hungarian table tennis player (1926–2023)

Kerekes Ilona
Personal information
- Nationality: Hungary
- Born: 25 October 1926 Bocșa, Romania
- Died: 20 October 2023 (aged 96)
Medal record
Representing Hungary
World Table Tennis Championships
Silver medal – second place	1950	Women's Team
Silver medal – second place	1954	Women's Team

Kerekes Ilona (born Sólyom; 25 October 1926 – 20 October 2023) was a Hungarian international table tennis player.

== Table tennis career ==
Kerekes won two medals in the World Table Tennis Championships and three medals in the Table Tennis European Championships.

Kerekes won two silver medals in 1950 and 1954 in the Corbillon Cup (women's team event).

Kerekes was also the runner-up in the European Championship final losing to Éva Kóczián in the final.

== Death ==
Kerekes died on 20 October 2023.

== See also ==
- List of table tennis players
- List of World Table Tennis Championships medalists
