= Hiroji Satoh =

Japanese table tennis player (1925–2000)

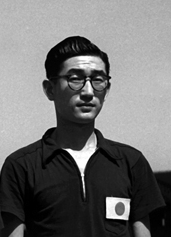
- Satoh in 1952

Personal information
- Full name: SATOH Hiroji
- Nationality: Japan
- Born: February 3, 1925
- Died: June 4, 2000 (aged 75)

Sport
- Sport: Table tennis
Medal record
Men's table tennis
Representing Japan
World Championships
Gold medal – first place	1952 Bombay	Singles
Bronze medal – third place	1952 Bombay	Team
Asian Championships
Bronze medal – third place	1953 Tokyo	Doubles
Silver medal – second place	1952 Singapore	Singles
Bronze medal – third place	1952 Singapore	Mixed Doubles
Silver medal – second place	1952 Singapore	Team

Hiroji Satoh (佐藤 博治, Satō Hiroji; 3 February 1925 – 4 June 2000) was an international table tennis player from Aomori, Japan.

== Table tennis career ==
From 1952 to 1953 he won two medals in the singles and team events in the World Table Tennis Championships and four medals in the Asian Table Tennis Championships.

He won bronze medal in the team event at the 1952 World Table Tennis Championships and a gold medal in the men's singles at the 1952 World Table Tennis Championships.

Sponge racquet, employed by the Japanese first, played a significant role in World Table Tennis Championships in early 1950s. In particular, Satoh was enabled to win the 1952 gold medal by sponge racquet. This sponge-covered rubber was invented by Rikizo Harada, the first president of manufacturer Armstrong Co., Ltd.

On his return to Tokyo, Satoh was greeted by a million people. He was the first Japanese to win a world title of any kind since the beginning of the war.

When Hiroji Satō lent his name to advertising purposes in the early 1950s, he was banned for life by the Japanese Table Tennis Association. According to the prevailing view at the time, this commercialization contradicted the amateur status of the sport.

Satoh was the chief basis for Koto Endo (played by Koto Kawaguchi), the arch nemesis and fellow table tennis player of the protagonist (loosely based on Marty Reisman) in the 2025 American film Marty Supreme.

== See also ==
- List of table tennis players
- List of World Table Tennis Championships medalists
