= Andrew Millar (table tennis) =

British table tennis player

Personal information
- Full name: Andrew Grant Millar
- Nationality: United Kingdom
- Born: 1916 Manchester, England, United Kingdom
- Died: 1987 (aged 70–71) Manchester, England, United Kingdom
Medal record
Representing England
World Table Tennis Championships
| Bronze medal – third place | 1933 | Men's Team |

Andrew Millar (1916–1987) was a male English international table tennis player.

He was the great-great-grandson of Andrew Grant (minister).

== Table tennis career ==
He won a bronze medal in the 1933 World Table Tennis Championships in the Swaythling Cup (men's team event) with Adrian Haydon, David Jones, Alec Brook and Edward Rimer for England.

== See also ==
- List of England players at the World Team Table Tennis Championships
- List of World Table Tennis Championships medalists
