= Yoshiko Tanaka (table tennis) =

Japanese table tennis player

Personal information
- Full name: Tanaka Yoshiko
- Nationality: Japan
- Born: 1932 (age 93–94)

Sport
- Sport: Table tennis
Medal record
Women's table tennis
Representing Japan
World Championships
Bronze medal – third place	1956 Tokyo	Doubles
Bronze medal – third place	1956 Tokyo	Mixed
Bronze medal – third place	1956 Tokyo	Team
Bronze medal – third place	1955 Utrecht	Doubles
Silver medal – second place	1955 Utrecht	Team
Silver medal – second place	1954 Wembley	Singles
Gold medal – first place	1954 Wembley	Team

Yoshiko Tanaka (田中 良子, Tanaka Yoshiko) is a former international table tennis player from Japan.

== Table tennis career ==
She won a gold medal in the women's team event at the World Table Tennis Championships in 1954.

In addition she won six other World Championship medals; one in the singles, two in the doubles, one in the mixed doubles and two in the team event.

== See also ==
- List of table tennis players
- List of World Table Tennis Championships medalists
