= Harry Venner =

England table tennis player

Personal information
- Nationality: England
- Born: 16 October 1923 London, England
- Died: 12 April 2015 (aged 91–92) Crawley, England
Medal record
Representing England
World Table Tennis Championships
Bronze medal – third place	1950	Men's Team
Silver medal – second place	1952	Men's Team
Bronze medal – third place	1954	Men's Team

Henry Thomas Venner (16 October 1923 – 12 April 2015), was a male international table tennis player from England.

== Table tennis career ==
Venner won three medals at the World Table Tennis Championships in the Swaythling Cup (men's team) event.

He was an all-out attacking player and used a hard rubber bat for the majority of his career before switching to a sandwich bat. He later became a coach and ran the Putney Club. He died on 12 April 2015.

== See also ==
- List of England players at the World Team Table Tennis Championships
- List of World Table Tennis Championships medalists
