= David Jones (table tennis) =

British table tennis player

Personal information
- Nationality: England
Medal record
Representing England
World Table Tennis Championships
Silver medal – second place	1931	Men's Team
Bronze medal – third place	1932	Men's Doubles
Bronze medal – third place	1933	Men's Team

David Jones was a male English international table tennis player.

He won a silver medal at the 1931 World Table Tennis Championships in the Swaythling Cup (men's team event), a bronze medal at the 1932 World Table Tennis Championships in the men's doubles with Charlie Bull. His third medal came in the 1933 World Table Tennis Championships in the Swaythling Cup (men's team event) for England.

He twice beat the great Viktor Barna in Swaythling Cup matches.

== See also ==
- List of England players at the World Team Table Tennis Championships
- List of World Table Tennis Championships medalists
