= Kichiji Tamasu =

Japanese table tennis player

Personal information
- Full name: Tamasu Kichiji
- Nationality: Japan
- Born: 1935
- Died: January 1956 (aged 20–21)

Sport
- Sport: Table tennis
Medal record
Men's table tennis
Representing Japan
World Championships
Gold medal – first place	1955 Utrecht	Team
Gold medal – first place	1954 Wembley	Team

Kichiji Tamasu (田舛 吉二, Tamasu Kichiji; 1935 – January, 1956) was a table tennis player from Japan. In 1954 and 1955 he won two gold medals in team events in the World Table Tennis Championships. He died from a heart attack in January 1956.
