= Marie Šmídová (table tennis) =

Czech table tennis player (1907–1963)

Personal information
- Nationality: Czech Republic
- Born: 19 April 1907
- Died: 1963 (aged 55–56)
Medal record
Representing Czechoslovakia
World Table Tennis Championships
Bronze medal – third place	1931	Women's Doubles
Bronze medal – third place	1932	Women's Singles
Silver medal – second place	1932	Women's Doubles
Bronze medal – third place	1932	Mixed Doubles
Bronze medal – third place	1934	Women's Team
Bronze medal – third place	1934	Women's Doubles
Bronze medal – third place	1934	Mixed Doubles
Silver medal – second place	1935	Women's Doubles
Gold medal – first place	1935	Women's Team
Bronze medal – third place	1935	Women's Singles
Bronze medal – third place	1936	Women's singles
Gold medal – first place	1936	Women's Team
Gold medal – first place	1936	Women's Doubles
Bronze medal – third place	1936	Mixed Doubles

Marie Šmídová (née Masáková; April 19, 1907 – 1963), was a female Czech international table tennis player.

== Table tennis career ==
She won fourteen World Table Tennis Championships medals, in the women's singles, doubles and team events and the mixed doubles. She won three gold medals; two in the team event and one in the women's doubles.

The fourteen World Championship medals included three gold medals; one in the doubles with Marie Kettnerová at the 1936 World Table Tennis Championships and two in the team event.

She also won two English Open titles.

== See also ==
- List of table tennis players
- List of World Table Tennis Championships medalists
