= Kiiko Watanabe =

Japanese table tennis player

Personal information
- Full name: Watanabe Kiiko
- Nationality: Japan
- Born: 1935 (age 90–91)

Sport
- Sport: Table tennis
Medal record
Women's table tennis
Representing Japan
World Championships
Bronze medal – third place	1957 Stockholm	Singles
Gold medal – first place	1957 Stockholm	Team
Silver medal – second place	1956 Tokyo	Singles
Silver medal – second place	1956 Tokyo	Doubles
Bronze medal – third place	1956 Tokyo	Team
Bronze medal – third place	1955 Utrecht	Singles
Bronze medal – third place	1955 Utrecht	Doubles
Silver medal – second place	1955 Utrecht	Team
Bronze medal – third place	1954 Wembley	Doubles
Gold medal – first place	1954 Wembley	Team

Kiiko Watanabe is a former international table tennis player from Japan.

== Table tennis career ==
From 1954 to 1957 she won ten medals in singles, doubles and in team events in the World Table Tennis Championships.

The ten World Championship medals included two gold medals in the team event for Japan.

== See also ==
- List of table tennis players
- List of World Table Tennis Championships medalists
