= Suh Sui Cho =

Hong Kong table tennis player

Personal information
- Nationality: Hong Kong
- Born: 1922 Shanghai, Republic of China
- Died: 23 February 2008 (aged 85–86) Canada

Sport
- Sport: Table tennis
Medal record
Representing Hong Kong
World Championships
Bronze medal – third place	1952 Bombay	Team
Asian Championships
Gold medal – first place	1957 Manila	Mixed Doubles
Gold medal – first place	1954 Singapore	Team
Gold medal – first place	1952 Singapore	Singles
Gold medal – first place	1952 Singapore	Doubles
Silver medal – second place	1952 Singapore	Mixed Doubles
Gold medal – first place	1952 Singapore	Team

Suh Sui Cho (Chinese: 薛緒初; Jyutping: sit^{3} seoi^{5} co^{1}) was a male table tennis player from Hong Kong. From 1952 to 1957 he won one medal in singles, three medals in doubles, and three medals in team events in the Asian Table Tennis Championships and in the World Table Tennis Championships.#

The world championship medal came during the 1952 World Table Tennis Championships where he won a bronze medal in the Swaythling Cup (men's team event) when representing Hong Kong.

== See also ==
- List of table tennis players
- List of World Table Tennis Championships medalists
