= Kathleen Best (table tennis) =

British table tennis player (1933–2003)

Personal information
- Nationality: England
- Born: 8 January 1933 Yorkshire, England
- Died: 5 October 2003 (aged 70) Leeds, Yorkshire, England
Medal record
Representing England
World Table Tennis Championships
Bronze medal – third place	1952	Women's Team
Silver medal – second place	1953	Women's Team
Bronze medal – third place	1953	Women's Doubles
Bronze medal – third place	1954	Women's Team
Silver medal – second place	1954	Women's Doubles

Cecilia Kathleen Best (8 January 1933 – 5 October 2003) was an English international table tennis player.

== Biography ==
Best won a bronze medal at the 1952 World Table Tennis Championships in the Corbillon Cup (women's team event). The following year at the 1953 World Table Tennis Championships she won two medals; a silver medal in the women's team and a bronze in the women's doubles with Ermelinde Wertl.

At the 1954 World Table Tennis Championships she picked up her fourth and fifth World Championship medals; winning a bronze in the women's team and a silver in the women's doubles with Ann Haydon-Jones.

Best married her coach Alan Thompson in 1952, in Yorkshire, and won two English Open titles. She died in Leeds on 5 October 2003, at the age of 70.

== See also ==
- List of England players at the World Team Table Tennis Championships
- List of World Table Tennis Championships medalists
