= Adrian Haydon =

British table tennis player

Personal information
- Full name: Arthur 'Adrian' Haydon
- Nationality: England
- Born: 11 October 1911 Kings Norton, Birmingham, UK
- Died: 12 September 1973 (aged 61) Stratford-upon-Avon, UK

Sport
- Sport: Table tennis
- Playing style: Left-hander
Medal record
Men's table tennis
Representing England
World Championships
Bronze medal – third place	1953 Bucharest	Doubles
Gold medal – first place	1953 Bucharest	Team
Bronze medal – third place	1952 Bombay	Doubles
Silver medal – second place	1952 Bombay	Team
Silver medal – second place	1948 Wembley	Doubles
Bronze medal – third place	1947 Paris	Doubles
Silver medal – second place	1935 Wembley	Doubles
Bronze medal – third place	1935 Wembley	Mixed
Bronze medal – third place	1933 Baden	Singles
Bronze medal – third place	1933 Baden	Team
Silver medal – second place	1931 Budapest	Team
Bronze medal – third place	1929 Budapest	Singles
Bronze medal – third place	1929 Budapest	Team
Bronze medal – third place	1928 Stockholm	Team

Arthur 'Adrian' Haydon (11 October 1911 – 12 September 1973) was a male international table tennis player from England.

== Table tennis career ==
He started playing table tennis aged just 7 years-old. During the 1927-28 season he was world ranked 6. He won fourteen medals in singles, doubles, and team events in the World Table Tennis Championships from 1928 to 1953, including a gold medal at the 1953 World Table Tennis Championships in the Swaythling Cup (men's team event).

== Personal life ==
He married international player Doris Jordan in 1938.

He is the father of Ann Haydon Jones, a finalist at the World Table Tennis Championships and a Grand Slam winner in tennis.

He also played for the Warwickshire County Cricket Club 2nd XI.

== See also ==
- List of table tennis players
- List of World Table Tennis Championships medalists
- List of England players at the World Team Table Tennis Championships
