= Rosalind Rowe =

British table tennis player (1933–2015)

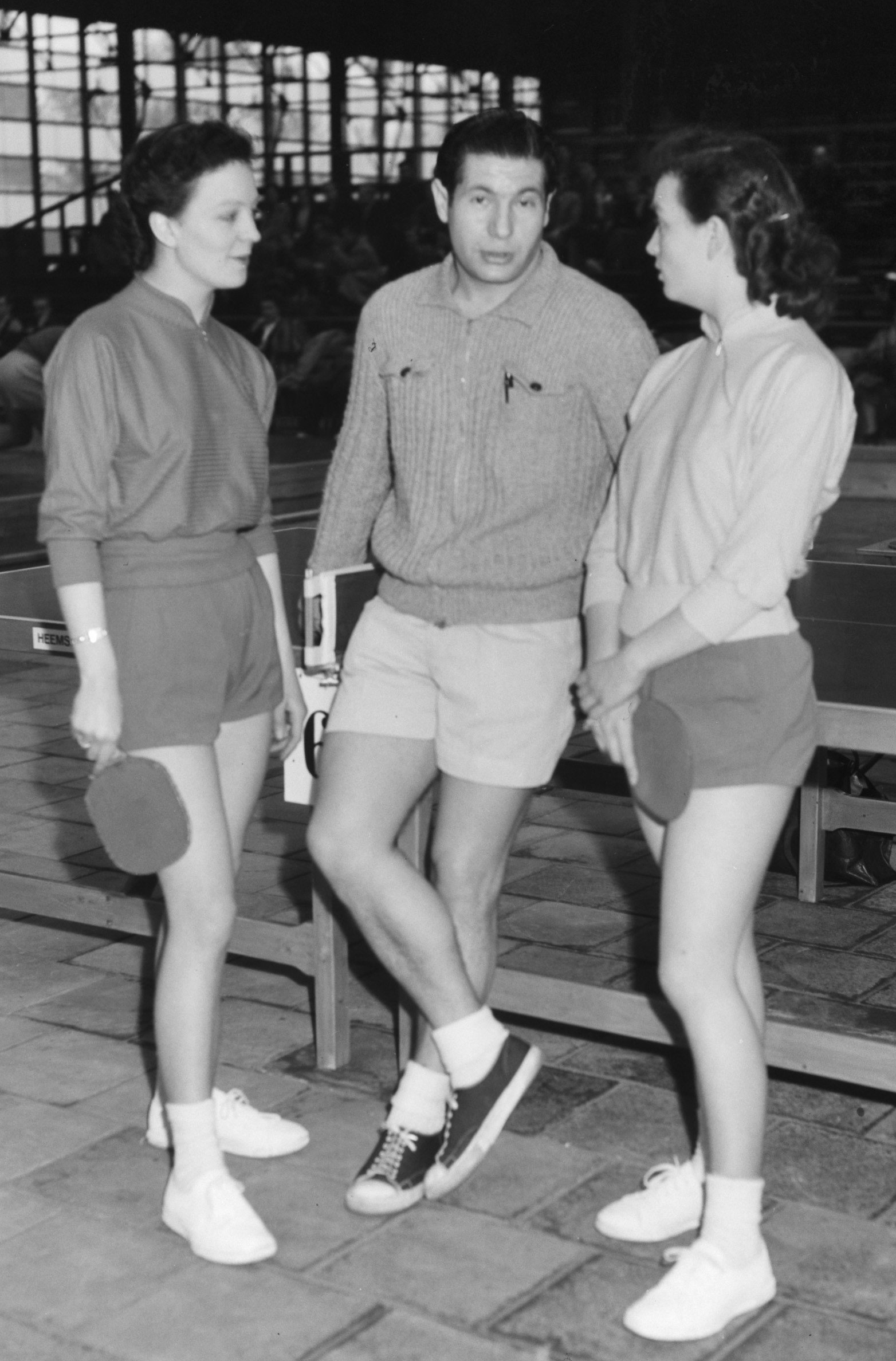
- Richard Bergmann with Diane and Rosalind Rowe (right) in 1953

Personal information
- Full name: Rosalind Rowe
- Nationality: England
- Born: 14 April 1933 Marylebone, London, England
- Died: 15 June 2015 (aged 82)

Sport
- Sport: Table tennis
Medal record
Table tennis
Representing England
World Championships
Silver medal – second place	1955 Utrecht	Doubles
Bronze medal – third place	1955 Utrecht	Team
Gold medal – first place	1954 Wembley	Doubles
Bronze medal – third place	1954 Wembley	Mixed Doubles
Bronze medal – third place	1954 Wembley	Team
Bronze medal – third place	1953 Bucharest	Singles
Silver medal – second place	1953 Bucharest	Doubles
Silver medal – second place	1953 Bucharest	Team
Bronze medal – third place	1952 Bombay	Singles
Silver medal – second place	1952 Bombay	Doubles
Bronze medal – third place	1952 Bombay	Mixed Doubles
Bronze medal – third place	1952 Bombay	Team
Gold medal – first place	1951 Vienna	Doubles
Bronze medal – third place	1951 Vienna	Team

Rosalind Cornett (née Rowe) (14 April 1933 – 15 June 2015) was a British table tennis player who multiple competitions at the World Table Tennis Championships between 1951 and 1955.

== Table tennis career ==
Rowe, and her twin sister Diane, were selected to play table tennis for England at age sixteen and toured Czechoslovakia. From 1951 to 1955 she won 14 medals in single, double, and team events in the World Table Tennis Championships, many of them together with her twin sister The pair were coached by Victor Barna.

The 14 World Championship medals included two gold medals in the doubles at the 1951 World Table Tennis Championships and 1954 World Table Tennis Championships.

== Biography ==
Rowe was born in Queen Charlotte’s Hospital, Hammersmith, London on 14 April 1933, the older twin sisters by 10 minutes. Her father, Ronald George Rowe was an account clerk and her mother was Edith, née Delany. Both her father, and uncle Vivian Rowe, played football for Brentford F.C. and Wimbledon F.C. Both she and her sister worked as secretarial administrators professionally, using their free time for table tennis, writing and public appearances. In 1955 she and her sister Diane published a book, The twins on table tennis.

Rowe took on a role at Dunlop company, to promote their products, such as table-tennis bats. Rowe married John Arthur Cornett, a doctor, on 8 October 1955 and they had four children together. Upon her marriage, she retired from competitive table tennis. She lived in Sittingbourne, Kent until her death on 15 June 2015 at Medway Maritime Hospital in Gillingham.

== See also ==
- List of table tennis players
- List of World Table Tennis Championships medalists
- List of England players at the World Team Table Tennis Championships
