= Diane Rowe =

British table tennis player (1933–2023)

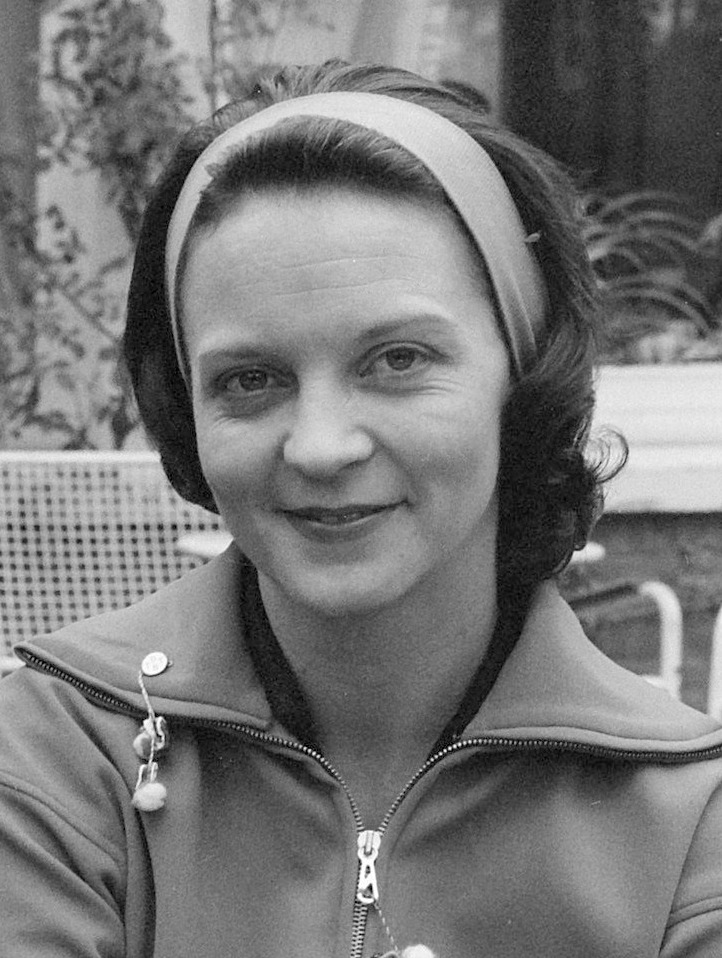
- Rowe in 1962

Personal information
- Full name: Diane Schöler-Rowe
- Nationality: English, West German
- Born: 14 April 1933 Marylebone, London, England
- Died: 19 June 2023 (aged 90) Düsseldorf, Germany

Sport
- Sport: Table tennis
Medal record
Table tennis
Representing West Germany
World Championships
Bronze medal – third place	1971 Nagoya	Mixed doubles
European Championships
Silver medal – second place	1972 Rotterdam	Team
Silver medal – second place	1970 Moscow	Doubles
Representing England
World Championships
Bronze medal – third place	1965 Ljubljana	Team
Silver medal – second place	1963 Prague	Doubles
Bronze medal – third place	1959 Dortmund	Doubles
Silver medal – second place	1957 Stockholm	Doubles
Bronze medal – third place	1956 Tokyo	Doubles
Silver medal – second place	1956 Tokyo	Team
Silver medal – second place	1955 Utrecht	Doubles
Bronze medal – third place	1955 Utrecht	Team
Gold medal – first place	1954 Wembley	Doubles
Bronze medal – third place	1954 Wembley	Team
Bronze medal – third place	1953 Bucharest	Singles
Silver medal – second place	1953 Bucharest	Doubles
Silver medal – second place	1953 Bucharest	Team
Silver medal – second place	1952 Bombay	Doubles
Silver medal – second place	1952 Bombay	Mixed doubles
Bronze medal – third place	1952 Bombay	Team
Gold medal – first place	1951 Vienna	Doubles
Bronze medal – third place	1951 Vienna	Mixed doubles
Bronze medal – third place	1951 Vienna	Team
European Championships
Bronze medal – third place	1966 London	Doubles
Gold medal – first place	1964 Malmo	Doubles
Gold medal – first place	1964 Malmo	Team
Silver medal – second place	1962 Berlin	Singles
Gold medal – first place	1962 Berlin	Doubles
Bronze medal – third place	1962 Berlin	Mixed doubles
Silver medal – second place	1962 Berlin	Team
Bronze medal – third place	1960 Zagreb	Singles
Bronze medal – third place	1960 Zagreb	Doubles
Silver medal – second place	1960 Zagreb	Team
Bronze medal – third place	1958 Budapest	Doubles
Gold medal – first place	1958 Budapest	Team

Diane Schöler (née Rowe; 14 April 1933 – 19 June 2023) was an English table tennis player. In 1966 she married German table tennis player Eberhard Schöler, and from that time on competed for West Germany. From 1951 to 1972 she won several medals in single, double, and team events in the Table Tennis European Championships, and in the World Table Tennis Championships.

Rowe started training in table tennis aged 14, under Viktor Barna. She was left-handed and until 1951 played a defensive style, but later put more accent on attacking. In early 1966, she married Eberhard Schöler and moved to Düsseldorf, where she gave birth to a daughter. She retired from competitions in 1973 and until 1997 worked as a table tennis coach. In 1993 she received the ITTF Merit Award, and in 2001 the Dieter Mauritz Gedächtnispreis.

Rowe also won 17 English Open titles.

Diane Rowe had a twin sister, Rosalind Rowe, who was also an international table tennis player. They often played doubles together. In 1955 they published a book The twins on table tennis. Their father was the amateur footballer Vivian Rowe, and their uncle was footballer Ronald Rowe.

Rowe died of cancer in Düsseldorf on 19 June 2023, at the age of 90.

== See also ==
- List of table tennis players
- List of World Table Tennis Championships medalists
- List of England players at the World Team Table Tennis Championships
