= István Reti (table tennis) =

Hungarian table tennis player

Personal information
- Nationality: Hungary
Medal record
Representing Hungary
World Table Tennis Championships
Bronze medal – third place	1929	Men's Doubles

István Reti was a male Hungarian international table tennis player.

He won a bronze medal at the 1929 World Table Tennis Championships in the men's doubles with György Szegedi.

== See also ==
- List of table tennis players
- List of World Table Tennis Championships medalists
