= 1947 in tennis =

This page covers all the important events in the sport of tennis in 1947. It provides the results of notable tournaments throughout the year on both the men's and women's ILTF tennis circuits.

== Australian Open ==
Category	Champion(s)	Finalist(s)	Score
Men's singles	(Australia) Dinny Pails	(Australia) John Bromwich	4–6, 6–4, 3–6, 7–5, 8–6
Women's singles	(Australia) Nancye Wynne Bolton	(Australia) Nell Hall Hopman	6–3, 6–2
Men's doubles	(Australia) John Bromwich (Australia) Adrian Quist	(Australia) Frank Sedgman (Australia) George Worthington	6–1, 6–3, 6–1
Women's doubles	(Australia) Thelma Coyne Long (Australia) Nancye Wynne Bolton	(Australia) Mary Bevis (Australia) Joyce Fitch	6–3, 6–3
Mixed doubles	(Australia) Nancye Wynne Bolton (Australia) Colin Long	(Australia) Joyce Fitch (Australia) John Bromwich	6–3, 6–3

== French Open ==
Category	Champion(s)	Finalist(s)	Score
Men's singles	(Hungary) József Asbóth	(South Africa) Eric Sturgess	8–6, 7–5, 6–4
Women's singles	(United States) Patricia Todd	(United States) Doris Hart	6–3, 3–6, 6–4
Men's doubles	(South Africa) Eustace Fannin (South Africa) Eric Sturgess	(United States) Tom Brown (Australia) Bill Sidwell	6–4, 4–6, 6–4, 6–3
Women's doubles	(United States) Louise Brough (United States) Margaret Osborne	(United States) Doris Hart (United States) Patricia Todd	7–5, 6–2
Mixed doubles	(South Africa) Sheila Piercey Summers (South Africa) Eric Sturgess	(Poland) Jadwiga Jędrzejowska (Romania) Cristea Caralulis	6–0, 6–0
Boys' singles	(Belgium) Jacques Brichant	(United Kingdom) Alan Roberts	6–3, 4–6, 7–5

== Wimbledon ==
Category	Champion(s)	Finalist(s)	Score
Men's singles	(United States) Jack Kramer	(United States) Tom Brown	6–1, 6–3, 6–2
Women's singles	(United States) Margaret Osborne	(United States) Doris Hart	6–2, 6–4
Men's doubles	(United States) Bob Falkenburg (United States) Jack Kramer	(United Kingdom) Tony Mottram (Australia) Bill Sidwell	8–6, 6–3, 6–3
Women's doubles	(United States) Doris Hart (United States) Patricia Todd	(United States) Louise Brough (United States) Margaret Osborne	3–6, 6–4, 7–5
Mixed doubles	(Australia) John Bromwich (United States) Louise Brough	(Australia) Colin Long (Australia) Nancye Wynne Bolton	1–6, 6–4, 6–2

== US Open ==
Category	Champion(s)	Finalist(s)	Score
Men's singles	(United States) Jack Kramer	(United States) Frank Parker	4–6, 2–6, 6–1, 6–0, 6–3
Women's singles	(United States) Louise Brough	(United States) Margaret Osborne	8–6, 4–6, 6–1
Men's doubles	(United States) Jack Kramer (United States) Ted Schroeder	(United States) Bill Talbert (Australia) Bill Sidwell	6–4, 7–5, 6–3
Women's doubles	(United States) Louise Brough (United States) Margaret Osborne	(United States) Patricia Todd (United States) Doris Hart	5–7, 6–3, 7–5
Mixed doubles	(United States) Louise Brough (Australia) John Bromwich	(United States) Gussie Moran (Ecuador) Pancho Segura	6–3, 6–1
