= 1949 Wimbledon Championships – Men's doubles =

Men's doubles
- 1949 Wimbledon Championships

Final
- Champions: (United States) Pancho Gonzales (United States) Frank Parker
- Runners-up: (United States) Gardnar Mulloy (United States) Ted Schroeder
- Score: 6–4, 6–4, 6–2

Details
- Draw: 64 (5Q)
- Seeds: 4

Events
Singles	men	women		boys	girls
Doubles	men	women	mixed	boys	girls
- Wimbledon Championships

John Bromwich and Frank Sedgman were the defending champions, but lost in the quarterfinals to Budge Patty and Eric Sturgess.

Pancho Gonzales and Frank Parker defeated Gardnar Mulloy and Ted Schroeder in the final, 6–4, 6–4, 6–2 to win the gentlemen's doubles tennis title at the 1949 Wimbledon Championship.

== Seeds ==
1. (United States) Gardnar Mulloy / (United States) Ted Schroeder (final)
2. (Australia) John Bromwich / (Australia) Frank Sedgman (quarterfinals)
3. (United States) Pancho Gonzales / (United States) Frank Parker (champions)
4. (Czechoslovakia) Jaroslav Drobný / (United States) Bob Falkenburg (quarterfinals)

Click on the seed number of a player to go to their draw section.

== Draw ==
Key

- Q = Qualifier
- WC = Wild card
- LL = Lucky loser
- Alt = Alternate
- ITF = ITF entry
- PR = Protected ranking
- SR = Special ranking
- SE = Special exempt
- JE = Junior exempt
- JR = Junior Accelerator Programme entrant
- CO = College Accelerator Programme entrant
- NG = Next Gen Accelerator Program entrant
- w/o = Walkover
- r = Retired
- d = Defaulted

=== Finals ===
Quarterfinals
2	(Australia) John Bromwich (Australia) Frank Sedgman	8	3	5	6	3
(United States) Budge Patty (South Africa) Eric Sturgess	6	6	7	3	6
3	(United States) Pancho Gonzales (United States) Frank Parker	6	6	6
(Italy) Giovanni Cucelli (Italy) Marcello del Bello	3	1	3
(Australia) Geoff Brown (Australia) Bill Sidwell	6	3	7	6	8
4	(Czechoslovakia) Jaroslav Drobný (United States) Bob Falkenburg	3	6	5	8	6
(United Kingdom) Tony Mottram (United Kingdom) Geoffrey Paish	2	6	3	8
1	(United States) Gardnar Mulloy (United States) Ted Schroeder	6	2	6	10

Semifinals
(United States) Budge Patty (South Africa) Eric Sturgess	3	1	6	7	5
3	(United States) Pancho Gonzales (United States) Frank Parker	6	6	3	5	7
(Australia) Geoff Brown (Australia) Bill Sidwell	4	6	8	3	7
1	(United States) Gardnar Mulloy (United States) Ted Schroeder	6	3	6	6	9

Final
3	(United States) Pancho Gonzales (United States) Frank Parker	6	6	6
1	(United States) Gardnar Mulloy (United States) Ted Schroeder	4	4	2

=== Top half ===
==== Section 1 ====
First round
2	(Australia) John Bromwich (Australia) Frank Sedgman	6	6	6
(Austria) Freddie Huber (Austria) Hans Redl	1	1	2
(United Kingdom) Peter Anderson (United Kingdom) Peter Lindner	4	4	6	7	1
(United Kingdom) Roy Mansell (United Kingdom) Gwyn Tuckett	6	6	3	5	6
(United Kingdom) Tony Clark (Romania) Alexandru Hamburger	6	2	3
(Republic of Ireland) Guy Jackson (Republic of Ireland) Cyril Kemp	8	6	6
(Hungary) Béla Pető (Poland) Władysław Skonecki	w/o
(United Kingdom) George Godsell (United Kingdom) Ted Tinling
(India) Naresh Kumar (India) Subba Sawhney	7	13	0	3	4
(France) Robert Colin (France) Bernard Destremau	5	11	6	6	6
(Denmark) Erik Bjerre (Denmark) Bent Koželuh	1	8	3	6	2
(France) Jean Ducos de la Haille (France) Christian Grandet	6	6	6	1	6
(United States) Budge Patty (South Africa) Eric Sturgess	6	6	6
(South Africa) Nigel Cockburn (South Africa) Sydney Levy	0	3	0
(United Kingdom) Leslie Cater (United Kingdom) Francis Wallis	6	6	6
(Finland) Pentti Forsman (Finland) Sakari Salo	2	4	4

Second round
2	(Australia) J Bromwich (Australia) F Sedgman	6	6	6
(United Kingdom) R Mansell (United Kingdom) G Tuckett	2	2	0
(Republic of Ireland) G Jackson (Republic of Ireland) C Kemp	6	6	4	6
(United Kingdom) G Godsell (United Kingdom) C Tinling	3	3	6	3
(France) R Colin (France) B Destremau	4	5	4
(France) J Ducos de la Haille (France) C Grandet	6	7	6
(United States) J Patty (South Africa) E Sturgess	6	6	6
(United Kingdom) L Cater (United Kingdom) F Wallis	1	2	2

Third round
2	(Australia) J Bromwich (Australia) F Sedgman	6	7	6
(Republic of Ireland) G Jackson (Republic of Ireland) C Kemp	1	5	1
(France) J Ducos de la Haille (France) C Grandet	2	2	3
(United States) J Patty (South Africa) E Sturgess	6	6	6

Quarterfinals
2	(Australia) J Bromwich (Australia) F Sedgman	8	3	5	6	3
(United States) J Patty (South Africa) E Sturgess	6	6	7	3	6

==== Section 2 ====
First round
3	(United States) Pancho Gonzales (United States) Frank Parker	6	7	6
(South Africa) Eustace Fannin (Australia) George Worthington	4	5	2
(Socialist Federal Republic of Yugoslavia) Dragutin Mitić (Socialist Federal Republic of Yugoslavia) Josip Palada	6	6	6
(United Kingdom) Bill Moss (United Kingdom) Gerry Oakley	2	1	2
(France) Paul Rémy (France) Jacques Thomas	6	6	6
(Egypt) Stephen Nimr (Egypt) Mahmoud Talaat	0	2	0
(Belgium) Jacques Brichant (Belgium) Philippe Washer	6	6	5	7
(United Kingdom) GI Bayley (United Kingdom) Claude Lister	3	4	7	5
(United Kingdom) Edmund David (United Kingdom) Herman David	6	3	2	9
(Australia) Jack Harper (Netherlands) Hans van Swol	4	6	6	11
(Hungary) Kálmán Fehér (Hungary) Dezső Vad	3	6	13	6	6
(Switzerland) René Buser (Switzerland) Hans Huonder	6	3	15	4	1
(Chile) Ricardo Balbiers (Chile) Marcelo Taverne	6	3	1	4
(Italy) Giovanni Cucelli (Italy) Marcello del Bello	3	6	6	6
(Australia) Alan Coldham (Poland) Ernest Wittmann	4	9	3
(United Kingdom) Henry Billington (United Kingdom) Don Butler	6	11	6

Second round
3	(United States) R Gonzales (United States) F Parker	8	6	6
(Socialist Federal Republic of Yugoslavia) D Mitić (Socialist Federal Republic of Yugoslavia) J Palada	6	2	3
(France) P Rémy (France) J Thomas	6	4	7	5
(Belgium) J Brichant (Belgium) P Washer	3	6	9	7
(Australia) J Harper (Netherlands) A van Swol	3	6	6	13
(Hungary) K Fehér (Hungary) D Vad	6	3	4	11
(Italy) G Cucelli (Italy) M del Bello	11	6	6
(United Kingdom) H Billington (United Kingdom) D Butler	9	4	1

Third round
3	(United States) R Gonzales (United States) F Parker	6	6	11	6
(Belgium) J Brichant (Belgium) P Washer	3	2	13	3
(Australia) J Harper (Netherlands) A van Swol	2	3	6	4
(Italy) G Cucelli (Italy) M del Bello	6	6	3	6

Quarterfinals
3	(United States) R Gonzales (United States) F Parker	6	6	6
(Italy) G Cucelli (Italy) M del Bello	3	1	3

=== Bottom half ===
==== Section 3 ====
First round
(United Kingdom) Roland Carter (United Kingdom) Jimmy Jones	6	3	6	6
(United States) Phil Hanna (United Kingdom) Henry Weatherall	3	6	1	3
(Hungary) József Asbóth (Hungary) András Ádám-Stolpa	3	4	2
(Australia) Geoff Brown (Australia) Bill Sidwell	6	6	6
(France) Robert Abdesselam (France) Jean Borotra	6	6	7
Q	(United Kingdom) Jack Moore (United Kingdom) Ron Statham	1	4	5
Q	(United Kingdom) Tony Dawes (United Kingdom) Noel Rowland	5	4	3
(Philippines) Felicisimo Ampon (Netherlands) Boebi van Meegeren	7	6	6
(Socialist Federal Republic of Yugoslavia) Milan Branović (Socialist Federal Republic of Yugoslavia) Petko Milojković	0	2	2
(Italy) Vanni Canepele (Italy) Rolando del Bello	6	6	6
(Poland) Czesław Spychała (Poland) Ignacy Tłoczyński	1	0	3
(United States) Earl Cochell (Sweden) Torsten Johansson	6	6	6
(Belgium) Pierre Geelhand de Merxem (Belgium) Jacques Peten	4	5	1
Q	(United Kingdom) John Horn (New Zealand) Athol Tills	6	7	6
(United Kingdom) Norman Kitovitz (United Kingdom) Tim Lewis	1	0	4
4	(Czechoslovakia) Jaroslav Drobný (United States) Bob Falkenburg	6	6	6

Second round
(United Kingdom) R Carter (United Kingdom) C Jones	0	3	4
(Australia) G Brown (Australia) W Sidwell	6	6	6
(France) R Abdesselam (France) J Borotra	6	6	6
(Philippines) F Ampon (Netherlands) R van Meegeren	3	4	0
(Italy) G Canepele (Italy) R del Bello	4	3	5
(United States) E Cochell (Sweden) T Johansson	6	6	7
(Belgium) P Geelhand de Merxem (Belgium) J Peten	4	4	4
4	(Czechoslovakia) J Drobný (United States) R Falkenburg	6	6	6

Third round
(Australia) G Brown (Australia) W Sidwell	6	6	6
(France) R Abdesselam (France) J Borotra	3	0	0
(United States) E Cochell (Sweden) T Johansson	5	3	3
4	(Czechoslovakia) J Drobný (United States) R Falkenburg	7	6	6

Quarterfinals
(Australia) G Brown (Australia) W Sidwell	6	3	7	6	8
4	(Czechoslovakia) J Drobný (United States) R Falkenburg	3	6	5	8	6

==== Section 4 ====
First round
(United Kingdom) Neil Cox (New Zealand) Frank Renouf	3	4	2
(United Kingdom) Tony Mottram (United Kingdom) Geoffrey Paish	6	6	6
(United Kingdom) Headley Baxter (United Kingdom) Cliff Hovell	6	6	7
(New Zealand) Dennis Coombe (Australia) Cliff Sproule	3	1	5
(Republic of Ireland) Raymond Egan (Republic of Ireland) George McVeagh	6	3	1	5
(Egypt) Marcel Coen (Egypt) Adli El Shafei	4	6	6	7
(Czechoslovakia) Vladimír Černík (Czechoslovakia) Jan Krajčík	6	6	6
(India) Janmeja Charanjiva (United Kingdom) Eddie Ford	3	0	2
(Spain) Jaime Bartrolí (Argentina) Heraldo Weiss	5	2	3
(Czechoslovakia) Milan Matouš (Socialist Federal Republic of Yugoslavia) Franjo Punčec	7	6	6
(Norway) Nils-Erik Hessen (Norway) Jan Staubo	4	3	4
(United Kingdom) Derek Bull (United Kingdom) Guy Cooper	6	6	6
(United Kingdom) Bobby Meredith (United Kingdom) Douglas Snart	4	4	3
Q	(United Kingdom) Freddie Della Porta (United Kingdom) Harley Watkins	6	6	6
Q	(United Kingdom) Derrick Leyland (United States) Jack Morison	6	2	1
1	(United States) Gardnar Mulloy (United States) Ted Schroeder	8	6	6

Second round
(United Kingdom) A Mottram (United Kingdom) G Paish	6	6	6
(United Kingdom) H Baxter (United Kingdom) C Hovell	1	1	4
(Egypt) M Coen (Egypt) A El Shafei	0^{r}
(Czechoslovakia) V Černík (Czechoslovakia) J Krajčík	3
(Czechoslovakia) M Matouš (Socialist Federal Republic of Yugoslavia) F Punčec	7	6	6
(United Kingdom) D Bull (United Kingdom) G Cooper	5	1	4
Q	(United Kingdom) A Della Porta (United Kingdom) H Watkins	1	0	4
1	(United States) G Mulloy (United States) F Schroeder	6	6	6

Third round
(United Kingdom) A Mottram (United Kingdom) G Paish	6	6	6
(Czechoslovakia) V Černík (Czechoslovakia) J Krajčík	2	2	4
(Czechoslovakia) M Matouš (Socialist Federal Republic of Yugoslavia) F Punčec	1	4	1
1	(United States) G Mulloy (United States) F Schroeder	6	6	6

Quarterfinals
(United Kingdom) A Mottram (United Kingdom) G Paish	2	6	3	8
1	(United States) G Mulloy (United States) F Schroeder	6	2	6	10
