= 1947 Wimbledon Championships – Mixed doubles =

Mixed doubles
- 1947 Wimbledon Championships

Final
- Champions: (Australia) John Bromwich (United States) Louise Brough
- Runners-up: (Australia) Colin Long (Australia) Nancye Bolton
- Score: 1–6, 6–4, 6–2

Details
- Draw: 81 (5Q)
- Seeds: 4

Events
Singles	men	women		boys	girls
Doubles	men	women	mixed	boys	girls
- Wimbledon Championships

Tom Brown and Louise Brough were the defending champions, but decided not to play together. Brown partnered with Margaret Osborne but lost in the semifinals to Colin Long and Nancye Bolton. Brough partnered with John Bromwich, and they defeated Long and Bolton in the final, 1–6, 6–4, 6–2 to win the mixed doubles tennis title at the 1947 Wimbledon Championships.

== Seeds ==
1. (Australia) John Bromwich / (United States) Louise Brough (champions)
2. (United States) Tom Brown / (United States) Margaret Osborne (semifinals)
3. (Australia) Colin Long / (Australia) Nancye Bolton (final)
4. (Sweden) Lennart Bergelin / (United States) Doris Hart (semifinals)

Click on the seed number of a player to go to their draw section.

== Draw ==
Key

- Q = Qualifier
- WC = Wild card
- LL = Lucky loser
- Alt = Alternate
- ITF = ITF entry
- PR = Protected ranking
- SR = Special ranking
- SE = Special exempt
- JE = Junior exempt
- JR = Junior Accelerator Programme entrant
- CO = College Accelerator Programme entrant
- NG = Next Gen Accelerator Program entrant
- w/o = Walkover
- r = Retired
- d = Defaulted

=== Finals ===
Quarterfinals
1	(United States) Tom Brown (United States) Margaret Osborne	6	6
(Czechoslovakia) Jaroslav Drobný (France) Simonne Mathieu	3	2
3	(Australia) Colin Long (Australia) Nancye Bolton	6	6
(Hungary) József Asbóth (Hungary) Zsuzsa Körmöczy	1	2
(Australia) Bill Sidwell (Australia) Nell Hopman	2	8
4	(Sweden) Lennart Bergelin (United States) Doris Hart	6	10
(South Africa) Eric Sturgess (South Africa) Sheila Summers	2	7
1	(Australia) John Bromwich (United States) Louise Brough	6	9

Semifinals
1	(United States) Tom Brown (United States) Margaret Osborne	5	2
3	(Australia) Colin Long (Australia) Nancye Bolton	7	6
4	(Sweden) Lennart Bergelin (United States) Doris Hart	4	2
1	(Australia) John Bromwich (United States) Louise Brough	6	6

Final
3	(Australia) Colin Long (Australia) Nancye Bolton	6	4	2
1	(Australia) John Bromwich (United States) Louise Brough	1	6	6

=== Top half ===
==== Section 1 ====
First round

Second round
1	(United States) Tom Brown (United States) Margaret Osborne	6	6
Q	(United Kingdom) Freddie Della Porta (United Kingdom) Patsy Rodgers	1	2
(United Kingdom) Tony Mottram (United Kingdom) Jean Bostock	6	6
(Italy) Marcello del Bello (Sweden) Birgit Gullbrandsson	3	1
(Romania) Vinny Rurac (Romania) Magda Rurac	6	7
(United Kingdom) Roland Carter (United Kingdom) Jean Quertier	3	5
(New Zealand) John Barry (United Kingdom) Anita Ellis	4	6	4
(United Kingdom) Jimmy Jones (United Kingdom) Ermyntrude Harvey	6	3	6

Third round
1	(United States) T Brown (United States) M Osborne	6	6
(United Kingdom) A Mottram (United Kingdom) J Bostock	0	3
(Romania) V Rurac (Romania) M Rurac	6	6	4
(United Kingdom) C Jones (United Kingdom) E Harvey	8	1	6

Fourth round
1	(United States) T Brown (United States) M Osborne	6	6
(United Kingdom) C Jones (United Kingdom) E Harvey	3	1

==== Section 2 ====
First round

Second round
(United Kingdom) Henry Billington (United Kingdom) Susan Billington	3	3
(Czechoslovakia) Jaroslav Drobný (France) Simonne Mathieu	6	6
(United Kingdom) Don Butler (United Kingdom) Bea Carris	3	7	9
(France) Pierre Pellizza (France) Colette Boegner	6	5	7
(United Kingdom) Paul Partridge (United Kingdom) Pam Bocquet	6	2
(United Kingdom) Derrick Leyland (United Kingdom) Jean Walker-Smith	8	6
(South Africa) Eustace Fannin (South Africa) Dorothy Muller	6	6
(Belgium) Jacques Brichant (Belgium) Miriamme de Borman	2	3

Third round
(Czechoslovakia) J Drobný (France) S Mathieu	6	6
(United Kingdom) D Butler (United Kingdom) B Carris	3	4
(United Kingdom) D Leyland (United Kingdom) J Walker-Smith	1	6
(South Africa) Eustace Fannin (South Africa) Dorothy Muller	6	8

Fourth round
(Czechoslovakia) J Drobný (France) S Mathieu	6	6
(South Africa) E Fannin (South Africa) D Muller	4	3

==== Section 3 ====
First round
Q	(United Kingdom) Jeffrey Michelmore (United Kingdom) Mary Stephens	6	3
(Poland) Ernest Wittmann (United Kingdom) Edith Middleton	8	6

Second round
3	(Australia) Colin Long (Australia) Nancye Bolton	6	6
(Norway) Nils-Erik Hessen (United Kingdom) Gladys Lines	2	1
(India) Jimmay Mehta (India) Hyacinth Cargin	6	6	3
(United Kingdom) Douglas Snart (United Kingdom) Wendy Stork	1	8	6
(Romania) Alexandru Hamburger (United Kingdom) Rosemary Morris	4	3
(India) Iftikar Ahmed (Netherlands) Madzy Couquerque	6	6
(United Kingdom) Norman Kitovitz (Australia) Alison Baker	4	4
(Poland) E Wittmann (United Kingdom) E Middleton	6	6

Third round
3	(Australia) C Long (Australia) N Bolton	6	6
(United Kingdom) D Snart (United Kingdom) W Stork	3	4
(India) I Ahmed (Netherlands) M Couquerque	6	1	5
(Poland) E Wittmann (United Kingdom) E Middleton	4	6	7

Fourth round
3	(Australia) C Long (Australia) N Bolton	6	6
(Poland) E Wittmann (United Kingdom) E Middleton	2	2

==== Section 4 ====
First round
(United States) Bill Robertson (United States) Gloria Butler	6	6
(United Kingdom) Charles Kingsley; M Koettlitz	2	2
(Republic of Ireland) George McVeagh (United Kingdom) Gay Chandler	6	4	3
(United Kingdom) Dickie Ritchie (United Kingdom) Joan Ingram	3	6	6
Q	(United Kingdom) Dennis Slack (United Kingdom) Georgie Woodgate	6	2	6
(United Kingdom) Bobby Meredith (United Kingdom) Elsa Haylock	3	6	4
(Poland) Maksymiljan Stolarow (United Kingdom) Madge Slaney	6	6
(United Kingdom) John Fulton (United Kingdom) Lesley Fulton	3	4
(Mandatory Palestine) Yehuda Finkelkraut (Mandatory Palestine) Gertrude Kornfeld	3	1
(United Kingdom) Claude Lister (United Kingdom) Thelma Lister	6	6
(Switzerland) Edgar Büchi (Switzerland) Luzia Studer	3	4
(United Kingdom) Paddy Roberts (United Kingdom) Joan Curry	6	6
(United Kingdom) David Mockridge (United Kingdom) Janet Morgan	0	4
(Hungary) József Asbóth (Hungary) Zsuzsa Körmöczy	6	6
(Republic of Ireland) Cyril Kemp (Republic of Ireland) Betty Lombard	6	6
(South Africa) Norman Farquharson (United Kingdom) Joy Gannon	1	1

Second round
(United States) W Robertson (United States) G Butler	1	2
(United Kingdom) R Ritchie (United Kingdom) J Ingram	6	6
Q	(United Kingdom) D Slack (United Kingdom) G Woodgate	9	6
(Poland) M Stolarow (United Kingdom) M Slaney	7	1
(United Kingdom) C Lister (United Kingdom) T Lister	3	6	3
(United Kingdom) A Roberts (United Kingdom) J Curry	6	4	6
(Hungary) J Asbóth (Hungary) Z Körmöczy	5	6	6
(Republic of Ireland) C Kemp (Republic of Ireland) E Lombard	7	3	2

Third round
(United Kingdom) R Ritchie (United Kingdom) J Ingram	4	7
Q	(United Kingdom) D Slack (United Kingdom) G Woodgate	6	9
(United Kingdom) A Roberts (United Kingdom) J Curry	0	0
(Hungary) J Asbóth (Hungary) Z Körmöczy	6	6

Fourth round
Q	(United Kingdom) D Slack (United Kingdom) G Woodgate	3	2
(Hungary) J Asbóth (Hungary) Z Körmöczy	6	6

The nationality of Miss M Koettlitz is unknown.

=== Bottom half ===
==== Section 5 ====
First round
(United Kingdom) Geoffrey Paish (United Kingdom) Betty Hilton	2	6	6
(Netherlands) Hans van Swol (United Kingdom) Vera Dace	6	3	2
(United Kingdom) Jack Piercy (United Kingdom) Pearl Panton	6	7	4
(New Zealand) Ron McKenzie (United Kingdom) Phyllis King	3	9	6
(Poland) Władysław Skonecki (Poland) Jadwiga Jędrzejowska	6	3	3
(Italy) Giovanni Cucelli (Italy) Annelise Bossi	3	6	6
(Czechoslovakia) Vladimír Černík (Czechoslovakia) Helena Straubeová	6	6
(United Kingdom) Peter Hare (United Kingdom) Valerie Cooper	3	4
Q	(United Kingdom) Raymond Fontes (United Kingdom) Nancy Fontes	1	4
(Hungary) András Ádám-Stolpa (Hungary) Márta Peterdy	6	6
(United Kingdom) Cliff Hovell (United Kingdom) Alex McKelvie	2	2
(Australia) Bill Sidwell (Australia) Nell Hopman	6	6
(Netherlands) Ivo Rinkel (United Kingdom) Elsie Hamilton	6	6
(India) Dilip Bose (Denmark) Milly Vagn-Nielsen	3	2
(Australia) Jack Harper (United Kingdom) Peggy Dawson-Scott	6	6
(United Kingdom) John Drinkall (United Kingdom) Joey David	2	3

Second round
(United Kingdom) G Paish (United Kingdom) E Hilton	5	6	3
(New Zealand) R McKenzie (United Kingdom) P King	7	4	6
(Italy) G Cucelli (Italy) A Bossi	4	4^{r}
(Czechoslovakia) V Černík (Czechoslovakia) H Straubeová	6	5
(Hungary) A Ádám-Stolpa (Hungary) M Peterdy	5	2
(Australia) W Sidwell (Australia) E Hopman	7	6
(Netherlands) I Rinkel (United Kingdom) E Hamilton	6	1	4
(Australia) J Harper (United Kingdom) P Dawson-Scott	2	6	6

Third round
(New Zealand) R McKenzie (United Kingdom) P King	6	6
(Czechoslovakia) V Černík (Czechoslovakia) H Straubeová	4	4
(Australia) W Sidwell (Australia) E Hopman	6	6
(Australia) J Harper (United Kingdom) P Dawson-Scott	1	2

Fourth round
(New Zealand) R McKenzie (United Kingdom) P King	4	2
(Australia) W Sidwell (Australia) E Hopman	6	6

==== Section 6 ====
First round

Second round
Q	(United Kingdom) Jack Warboys (United Kingdom) Billie Woodgate	4	3
(Egypt) Stephen Nimr (United Kingdom) Billie Yorke	6	6
(United States) Bob Falkenburg (United States) Pat Todd	6	6
(New Zealand) Cam Malfroy (United Kingdom) Mary Halford	2	4
(United Kingdom) Howard Walton (United Kingdom) Joy Hibbert	3	2
(Norway) Jan Staubo (United Kingdom) Effie Peters	6	6
(United Kingdom) Murray Deloford (United Kingdom) Sheila Kenyon	1	1
4	(Sweden) Lennart Bergelin (United States) Doris Hart	6	6

Third round
(Egypt) S Nimr (United Kingdom) A Yorke	1	5
(United States) R Falkenburg (United States) P Todd	6	7
(Norway) J Staubo (United Kingdom) E Peters	3	4
4	(Sweden) L Bergelin (United States) D Hart	6	6

Fourth round
(United States) R Falkenburg (United States) P Todd	2	4
4	(Sweden) L Bergelin (United States) D Hart	6	6

==== Section 7 ====
First round

Second round
(South Africa) Eric Sturgess (South Africa) Sheila Summers	6	6
(United Kingdom) Herman David (United Kingdom) Nancy Glover	1	4
(United Kingdom) Guy Cooper (United Kingdom) Penny Durlac	4	5
(United Kingdom) Gwyn Tuckett (United Kingdom) Molly Blair	6	7
(United Kingdom) Headley Baxter (United Kingdom) Audrey Osborne	6	6
(Australia) Jack Crawford (United Kingdom) Kay Menzies	3	4
(New Zealand) Owen Bold (United Kingdom) Betty Coutts	8	9
(United Kingdom) Cecil Betts (United Kingdom) Yvonne Law	6	7

Third round
(South Africa) E Sturgess (South Africa) S Summers	6	6
(United Kingdom) G Tuckett (United Kingdom) M Blair	3	4
(United Kingdom) H Baxter (United Kingdom) A Osborne	6	3	2
(New Zealand) Owen Bold (United Kingdom) Betty Coutts	3	6	6

Fourth round
(South Africa) E Sturgess (South Africa) S Summers	6	6
(New Zealand) O Bold (United Kingdom) B Coutts	1	1

==== Section 8 ====
First round

Second round
(Denmark) Erik Bjerre (Luxembourg) Alice Weiwers	6	6
(United Kingdom) Bill Manby (United Kingdom) Joan Strawson	1	3
(New Zealand) Jeff Robson (United Kingdom) Peggy Knight	1	2
(Belgium) Philippe Washer (Belgium) Josane de Meulemeester	6	6
(United Kingdom) GI Bayley (United Kingdom) Audrey Roberts	6	3	6
(Austria) Hans Redl (Austria) Hilde Doleschell	3	6	1
(France) Jacques Sanglier (France) Monique Hamelin	1	1
1	(Australia) John Bromwich (United States) Louise Brough	6	6

Third round
(Denmark) E Bjerre (Luxembourg) A Weiwers	5	1
(Belgium) P Washer (Belgium) J de Meulemeester	7	6
(United Kingdom) GI Bayley (United Kingdom) A Roberts	1	2
1	(Australia) J Bromwich (United States) L Brough	6	6

Fourth round
(Belgium) P Washer (Belgium) J de Meulemeester	0	0
1	(Australia) J Bromwich (United States) L Brough	6	6
