= 1947 Wimbledon Championships – Men's singles =

Men's singles
- 1947 Wimbledon Championships

Final
- Champion: (United States) Jack Kramer
- Runner-up: (United States) Tom Brown
- Score: 6–1, 6–3, 6–2

Details
- Draw: 128 (10Q)
- Seeds: 8

Events
Singles	men	women		boys	girls
Doubles	men	women	mixed	boys	girls
- Wimbledon Championships

Jack Kramer defeated Brown in the final, 6–1, 6–3, 6–2 to win the gentlemen's singles tennis title at the 1947 Wimbledon Championships. Yvon Petra was the defending champion, but lost in the quarterfinals to Tom Brown.

== Seeds ==
1. (United States) Jack Kramer (champion)
2. (Australia) John Bromwich (fourth round)
3. (United States) Tom Brown (final)
4. (Australia) Dinny Pails (semifinals)
5. (Australia) Geoff Brown (quarterfinals)
6. (Czechoslovakia) Jaroslav Drobný (quarterfinals)
7. (France) Yvon Petra (quarterfinals)
8. (United States) Bob Falkenburg (quarterfinals)

Click on the seed number of a player to go to their draw section.

== Draw ==
Key

- Q = Qualifier
- WC = Wild card
- LL = Lucky loser
- Alt = Alternate
- ITF = ITF entry
- PR = Protected ranking
- SR = Special ranking
- SE = Special exempt
- JE = Junior exempt
- JR = Junior Accelerator Programme entrant
- CO = College Accelerator Programme entrant
- NG = Next Gen Accelerator Program entrant
- w/o = Walkover
- r = Retired
- d = Defaulted

=== Finals ===
Quarterfinals
(United States) Budge Patty	3	6	7	6	6
6	(Czechoslovakia) Jaroslav Drobný	6	4	9	2	3
3	(United States) Tom Brown	7	6	6
7	(France) Yvon Petra	5	2	4
8	(United States) Bob Falkenburg	6	6	3	0	2
4	(Australia) Dinny Pails	4	4	6	6	6
5	(Australia) Geoff Brown	0	1	3
1	(United States) Jack Kramer	6	6	6

Semifinals
(United States) Budge Patty	3	3	3
3	(United States) Tom Brown	6	6	6
4	(Australia) Dinny Pails	1	6	1	0
1	(United States) Jack Kramer	6	3	6	6

Final
3	(United States) Tom Brown	1	3	2
1	(United States) Jack Kramer	6	6	6

=== Top half ===
==== Section 1 ====
First round
2	(Australia) John Bromwich	6	6	6
(Switzerland) Jost Spitzer	1	2	4
(Sweden) Lennart Bergelin	6	6	6
(United Kingdom) Dick Guise	2	3	1
(United Kingdom) Paddy Roberts	1	1	4
(France) Bernard Destremau	6	6	6
Q	(United Kingdom) Tony Starte	5	3	4
(Republic of Ireland) Cyril Kemp	7	6	6
(United States) Budge Patty	4	6	3	6	6
(Australia) Bill Sidwell	6	3	6	2	3
(India) Atri Madan Mohan	6	6	6
Q	(Republic of Ireland) Dick Sandys	2	4	3
(Norway) Nils-Erik Hessen	2	4	2
(United Kingdom) Derrick Barton	6	6	6
(United Kingdom) Gordon Fitt	4	5	3
(United Kingdom) Henry Billington	6	7	6

Second round
2	(Australia) J Bromwich	6	6	11
(Sweden) L Bergelin	0	4	9
(France) B Destremau	4	6	4	6	6
(Republic of Ireland) C Kemp	6	3	6	3	4
(United States) J Patty	7	1	6	5	6
(India) AM Mohan	5	6	2	7	3
(United Kingdom) D Barton	3	6	6	6
(United Kingdom) H Billington	6	2	2	1

Third round
2	(Australia) J Bromwich	6	6	6
(France) B Destremau	1	1	1
(United States) J Patty	6	6	3	6
(United Kingdom) D Barton	3	4	6	1

Fourth round
2	(Australia) J Bromwich	4	6	4	6	4
(United States) J Patty	6	0	6	1	6

==== Section 2 ====
First round
6	(Czechoslovakia) Jaroslav Drobný	7	7	6
(Ecuador) Pancho Segura	5	5	3
(India) Jimmay Mehta	6	3	3	9	6
(France) Jacques Sanglier	1	6	6	7	3
(New Zealand) Cam Malfroy	1	6	1
(Mandatory Palestine) Yehuda Finkelkraut	6	8	6
(Hungary) Tibor Frigyesy	6	3	4	3
(Poland) Władysław Skonecki	4	6	6	6
Q	(United Kingdom) Warwick Shute	3	7	0
(Belgium) Jacques Peten	6	9	6
Q	(United Kingdom) Geoff Emmett	2	2	1
(Egypt) Andre Najar	6	6	6
(Spain) Luis Carles	4	0	3
(New Zealand) Ron McKenzie	6	6	6
(Argentina) Enrique Morea	6	6	6	9
(Italy) Marcello del Bello	3	2	8	7

Second round
6	(Czechoslovakia) J Drobný	6	6	6
(India) J Mehta	2	1	2
(Mandatory Palestine) Y Finkelkraut	0	4	3
(Poland) W Skonecki	6	6	6
(Belgium) J Peten	6	6	6	6
(Egypt) A Najar	8	1	2	2
(New Zealand) R McKenzie	6	3	4	4
(Argentina) E Morea	2	6	6	6

Third round
6	(Czechoslovakia) J Drobný	6	6	6
(Poland) W Skonecki	3	1	3
(Belgium) J Peten	6	2	3	3
(Argentina) E Morea	1	6	6	6

Fourth round
6	(Czechoslovakia) J Drobný
(Argentina) E Morea	w/o

==== Section 3 ====
First round
3	(United States) Tom Brown	7	5	6	2	8
(South Africa) Eric Sturgess	5	7	2	6	6
(United Kingdom) Peter Hare	11	8	2	3
(France) Christian Grandet	13	6	6	6
Q	(United Kingdom) Roy Mansell	3	6	2
(Netherlands) Ivo Rinkel	6	8	6
(United Kingdom) Cliff Hovell	7	3	6	3	4
(United Kingdom) Headley Baxter	5	6	3	6	6
(Romania) Vinny Rurac	6	6	6
LL	(United Kingdom) David Mockridge	0	1	4
(United Kingdom) Jack Moore	3	0	1
(Poland) Ignacy Tłoczyński	6	6	6
(Belgium) Jacques Brichant	1	1	2
(Australia) Jack Harper	6	6	6
(Australia) Colin Long	6	6	6
(Denmark) Bjørn Hansen	1	1	0

Second round
3	(United States) T Brown	6	6	6
(France) C Grandet	3	4	4
(Netherlands) I Rinkel	6	2	6	1
(United Kingdom) H Baxter	3	6	8	6
(Romania) V Rurac	7	3	7	4	6
(Poland) I Tłoczyński	5	6	5	6	4
(Australia) J Harper	2	2	4
(Australia) C Long	6	6	6

Third round
3	(United States) T Brown	6	6	10	6
(United Kingdom) H Baxter	2	2	12	4
(Romania) V Rurac	3	2	3
(Australia) C Long	6	6	6

Fourth round
3	(United States) T Brown	3	13	3	6	6
(Australia) C Long	6	11	6	1	0

==== Section 4 ====
First round
7	(France) Yvon Petra	6	7	6
(United Kingdom) Don Butler	2	5	0
(United Kingdom) Howard Walton	6	6	5	8
(United Kingdom) John Comery	2	3	7	6
Q	(United Kingdom) Gerry Oakley	2	3	0
(India) Dilip Bose	6	6	6
Q	(United Kingdom) John Griffith	4	3	4
(Belgium) Jack Van den Eynde	6	6	6
(New Zealand) Jeff Robson	6	6	1	6
(United Kingdom) Arnold England	3	2	6	0
(United Kingdom) Jack Piercy	6	5	6	6
(United Kingdom) Bob Tinkler	1	7	3	3
(United Kingdom) George Godsell	4	5	6	7	4
(Switzerland) Edgar Büchi	6	7	4	5	6
(United Kingdom) Jimmy Jones	6	7	6
(United Kingdom) Francis Wallis	3	5	4

Second round
7	(France) Y Petra	6	6	6
(United Kingdom) H Walton	2	2	2
(India) D Bose	2	6	6	3	6
(Belgium) J Van den Eynde	6	1	4	6	4
(New Zealand) J Robson	7	2	4	6	13
(United Kingdom) J Piercy	5	6	6	3	11
(Switzerland) E Büchi	6	3	2	3
(United Kingdom) C Jones	4	6	6	6

Third round
7	(France) Y Petra	6	6	6
(India) D Bose	3	4	3
(New Zealand) J Robson	6	2	6	6	10
(United Kingdom) C Jones	4	6	8	4	8

Fourth round
7	(France) Y Petra	6	6	4	6
(New Zealand) J Robson	2	3	6	3

=== Bottom half ===
==== Section 5 ====
First round
LL	(United Kingdom) John Archer	6	0	3	4
(Austria) Hans Redl	4	6	6	6
(Switzerland) Max Ellmer	5	8	8	6
(Australia) Jack Crawford	7	6	6	0
(New Zealand) John Barry	0	4	8	6	6
(United Kingdom) Geoffrey Paish	6	6	6	4	4
(United Kingdom) Douglas Snart	6	2	9	3
(United Kingdom) Dennis Slack	4	6	11	6
(Norway) Finn Rune Karlsen	6	1	2	3
(Poland) Józef Hebda	4	6	6	6
(United Kingdom) Claude Lister	6	6	7
(Mandatory Palestine) Mordechai Apel	4	3	5
(United Kingdom) Roland Carter	6	9	4	4	8
(Romania) Cristea Caralulis	3	7	6	6	6
(Belgium) Philippe Washer	2	2	2
8	(United States) Bob Falkenburg	6	6	6

Second round
(Austria) H Redl	6	2	6	6
(Switzerland) M Ellmer	2	6	3	4
(New Zealand) J Barry	5	2	5
(United Kingdom) D Slack	7	6	7
(Poland) J Hebda	6	3	3	2
(United Kingdom) C Lister	1	6	6	6
(United Kingdom) R Carter	2	1	5
8	(United States) R Falkenburg	6	6	7

Third round
(Austria) H Redl	1	6	7	0	6
(United Kingdom) D Slack	6	3	5	6	3
(United Kingdom) C Lister	5	3	1
8	(United States) R Falkenburg	7	6	6

Fourth round
(Austria) H Redl	3	3	4
8	(United States) R Falkenburg	6	6	6

==== Section 6 ====
First round
(Australia) Alan Coldham	2	2	4
(India) Iftikar Ahmed	6	6	6
(United Kingdom) Jeffrey Michelmore	6	6	6	3	6
(Republic of Ireland) Raymond Egan	8	0	2	6	1
(Hungary) Géza Erős	0	3	2
(South Africa) Eustace Fannin	6	6	6
(United Kingdom) Derrick Leyland	4	3	4
(France) Robert Abdesselam	6	6	6
(Hungary) András Ádám-Stolpa	6	6	6
Q	(United Kingdom) Ron Reeve	2	2	2
(United Kingdom) Herman David	6	6	2	3
(India) Sumant Misra	4	8	6	6
(Norway) Jan Staubo	6	7	6
(United Kingdom) Guy Cooper	2	5	2
(United Kingdom) Leslie Cater	1	0	1
4	(Australia) Dinny Pails	6	6	6

Second round
(India) I Ahmed	6	6	6
(United Kingdom) J Michelmore	0	1	3
(South Africa) E Fannin	9	3	6	4
(France) R Abdesselam	11	6	2	6
(Hungary) A Ádám-Stolpa	4	5	1
(India) S Misra	6	7	6
(Norway) J Staubo	2	1	1
4	(Australia) D Pails	6	6	6

Third round
(India) I Ahmed	7	4	9	6	4
(France) R Abdesselam	9	6	7	4	6
(India) S Misra	4	3	2
4	(Australia) D Pails	6	6	6

Fourth round
(France) R Abdesselam	2	1	4
4	(Australia) D Pails	6	6	6

==== Section 7 ====
First round
(Egypt) Stephen Nimr	2	2	0
(Republic of China (1912–1949)) Choy Wai-Chuen	6	6	6
Q	(Republic of Ireland) Guy Jackson	6	6	3	6
(United Kingdom) Murray Deloford	8	1	6	8
(South Africa) Norman Farquharson	6	5	5
(United Kingdom) Tony Mottram	8	7	7
(France) Pierre Pellizza	6	6	6
(United Kingdom) Derek Bull	2	1	0
(United Kingdom) Tim Lewis	3	3	6	1
(Denmark) Erik Bjerre	6	6	4	6
(United Kingdom) Bobby Meredith	4	8	7	6
(Poland) Ernest Wittmann	6	6	5	4
(Romania) Alexandru Hamburger	1	2	5
(Czechoslovakia) Vladimír Černík	6	6	7
(United States) Bill Robertson	1	0	3
5	(Australia) Geoff Brown	6	6	6

Second round
(Republic of China (1912–1949)) W-C Choy	3	6	6	4	3
(United Kingdom) M Deloford	6	3	4	6	6
(United Kingdom) A Mottram	5	3	10	4
(France) P Pellizza	7	6	8	6
(Denmark) E Bjerre	6	4	1^{r}
(United Kingdom) G Meredith	2	6	3
(Czechoslovakia) V Černík	4	6	1	6	1
5	(Australia) G Brown	6	2	6	4	6

Third round
(United Kingdom) M Deloford	6	7	3	3
(France) P Pellizza	4	9	6	6
(United Kingdom) G Meredith	2	1	3
5	(Australia) G Brown	6	6	6

Fourth round
(France) P Pellizza	3	2	6	3
5	(Australia) G Brown	6	6	1	6

==== Section 8 ====
First round
(Belgium) Pierre Geelhand de Merxem	6	6	8	6
(United Kingdom) Edmund David	1	3	10	4
(United Kingdom) Brian Royds	0	0	0
(Sweden) Torsten Johansson	6	6	6
(Hungary) József Asbóth	7	6	6	5	6
(Netherlands) Hans van Swol	9	4	3	7	1
(India) Ghaus Mohammad Khan	6	6	6
(United Kingdom) Gwyn Tuckett	2	2	3
LL	(Argentina) José Luis Morea	7	3	6	2
(New Zealand) Owen Bold	9	6	2	6
(Italy) Giovanni Cucelli	6	6	6
(United Kingdom) Norman Kitovitz	3	4	1
(United Kingdom) John Drinkall	5	0	4
(Poland) Czesław Spychała	7	6	6
Q	(United Kingdom) Bill Moss	0	1	0
1	(United States) Jack Kramer	6	6	6

Second round
(Belgium) P Geelhand de Merxem	0	0	0
(Sweden) T Johansson	6	6	6
(Hungary) J Asbóth	6	6	6
(India) G Mohammad Khan	3	2	4
(New Zealand) O Bold	0	4	8	3
(Italy) G Cucelli	6	6	6	6
(Poland) C Spychała	2	2	2
1	(United States) J Kramer	6	6	6

Third round
(Sweden) T Johansson	8	5	6	6
(Hungary) J Asbóth	6	7	2	2
(Italy) G Cucelli	0	2	0
1	(United States) J Kramer	6	6	6

Fourth round
(Sweden) T Johansson	5	2	3
1	(United States) J Kramer	7	6	6

Preceded by 1947 Australian Championships	Grand Slams; Men's Singles	Succeeded by 1947 French Championships
