= 1947 Wimbledon Championships – Men's doubles =

Men's doubles
- 1947 Wimbledon Championships

Final
- Champions: (United States) Bob Falkenburg (United States) Jack Kramer
- Runners-up: (United Kingdom) Tony Mottram (Australia) Bill Sidwell
- Score: 8–6, 6–3, 6–3

Details
- Draw: 64 (5Q)
- Seeds: 4

Events
Singles	men	women		boys	girls
Doubles	men	women	mixed	boys	girls
- Wimbledon Championships

Tom Brown and Jack Kramer were the defending champions, but decided not to play together. Brown partnered with Budge Patty but lost in the first round to Tony Mottram and Bill Sidwell. Kramer partnered with Bob Falkenburg, and they defeated Mottram and Sidwell in the final, 8–6, 6–3, 6–3 to win the gentlemen's doubles tennis title at the 1947 Wimbledon Championship.

== Seeds ==
1. (United States) Bob Falkenburg / (United States) Jack Kramer (champions)
2. (Australia) John Bromwich / (Australia) Dinny Pails (semifinals)
3. (Australia) Geoff Brown / (Australia) Colin Long (semifinals)
4. (United States) Tom Brown / (United States) Budge Patty (first round)

Click on the seed number of a player to go to their draw section.

== Draw ==
Key

- Q = Qualifier
- WC = Wild card
- LL = Lucky loser
- Alt = Alternate
- ITF = ITF entry
- PR = Protected ranking
- SR = Special ranking
- SE = Special exempt
- JE = Junior exempt
- JR = Junior Accelerator Programme entrant
- CO = College Accelerator Programme entrant
- NG = Next Gen Accelerator Program entrant
- w/o = Walkover
- r = Retired
- d = Defaulted

=== Finals ===
Quarterfinals
1	(United States) Bob Falkenburg (United States) Jack Kramer	6	6	6
(United Kingdom) Derrick Barton (United Kingdom) Geoffrey Paish	2	4	4
3	(Australia) Geoff Brown (Australia) Colin Long	9	5	6	6
(South Africa) Eustace Fannin (South Africa) Eric Sturgess	7	7	4	3
(India) Jimmy Mehta (India) Sumant Misra	6	7	4	4
(United Kingdom) Tony Mottram (Australia) Bill Sidwell	2	9	6	6
(France) Pierre Pellizza (France) Yvon Petra	4	9	4
2	(Australia) John Bromwich (Australia) Dinny Pails	6	11	6

Semifinals
1	(United States) Bob Falkenburg (United States) Jack Kramer	10	6	6
3	(Australia) Geoff Brown (Australia) Colin Long	8	4	4
(United Kingdom) Tony Mottram (Australia) Bill Sidwell	6	6	7
2	(Australia) John Bromwich (Australia) Dinny Pails	3	3	5

Final
1	(United States) Bob Falkenburg (United States) Jack Kramer	8	6	6
(United Kingdom) Tony Mottram (Australia) Bill Sidwell	6	3	3

=== Top half ===
==== Section 1 ====
First round
1	(United States) Bob Falkenburg (United States) Jack Kramer	6	6	6
(United Kingdom) Murray Deloford (United Kingdom) Tim Lewis	1	4	3
(United Kingdom) Jimmy Jones (United Kingdom) Bill Manby	1	3	2
(France) Robert Abdesselam (France) Bernard Destremau	6	6	6
(United Kingdom) Bobby Meredith (United Kingdom) Douglas Snart
(Egypt) Andre Najar (Egypt) Adli El Shafei	w/o
Q	(United Kingdom) John Griffith (United Kingdom) Jack Moore	6	6	6
(United Kingdom) Harry Marriner (United Kingdom) Harold Marsland	1	3	4
(Switzerland) Max Ellmer (Switzerland) Jost Spitzer	7	6	6
(United Kingdom) John Drinkall (Republic of Ireland) Guy Jackson	5	2	3
(Belgium) Jacques Peten (Belgium) Jack Van den Eynde	6	7	6
(United Kingdom) GI Bayley (United Kingdom) Claude Lister	4	5	3
(Romania) Alexandru Hamburger (United Kingdom) Derrick Leyland	9	3	6	4
(Spain) Jaime Bartrolí (Spain) Fernando Olozaga	7	6	8	6
(United Kingdom) Derrick Barton (United Kingdom) Geoffrey Paish	6	6	6
Q	(United Kingdom) Neil Cox (United Kingdom) Freddie Della Porta	4	1	4

Second round
1	(United States) R Falkenburg (United States) J Kramer	6	7	6
(France) R Abdesselam (France) B Destremau	1	5	3
(United Kingdom) G Meredith (United Kingdom) D Snart	5	6	6	6
Q	(United Kingdom) J Griffith (United Kingdom) J Moore	7	3	2	4
(Switzerland) M Ellmer (Switzerland) J Spitzer	8	6	3	12
(Belgium) J Peten (Belgium) J Van den Eynde	6	1	6	10
(Spain) J Bartrolí (Spain) F Olozaga	4	2	4
(United Kingdom) D Barton (United Kingdom) G Paish	6	6	6

Third round
1	(United States) R Falkenburg (United States) J Kramer	6	6	6
(United Kingdom) G Meredith (United Kingdom) D Snart	1	0	3
(Switzerland) M Ellmer (Switzerland) J Spitzer	7	6	2	3
(United Kingdom) D Barton (United Kingdom) G Paish	9	4	6	6

Quarterfinals
1	(United States) R Falkenburg (United States) J Kramer	6	6	6
(United Kingdom) D Barton (United Kingdom) G Paish	2	4	4

==== Section 2 ====
First round
3	(Australia) Geoff Brown (Australia) Colin Long	6	6	7
(New Zealand) Ron McKenzie (New Zealand) Jeff Robson	1	1	5
Q	(Australia) Joseph Clynton-Reed (Australia) John Spence	4	2	6
(Sweden) Lennart Bergelin (Sweden) Torsten Johansson	6	6	8
(United Kingdom) Jack Piercy (United States) Bill Robertson	4	5	6	3
(Denmark) Erik Bjerre (Hungary) Tibor Frigyesy	6	7	1	6
(United Kingdom) Jack Warboys (Poland) Ernest Wittmann	3	3	0
(Netherlands) Ivo Rinkel (Netherlands) Hans van Swol	6	6	6
(South Africa) Eustace Fannin (South Africa) Eric Sturgess	6	6	6
(Norway) Nils-Erik Hessen (Norway) Jan Staubo	1	1	1
(United Kingdom) Headley Baxter (United Kingdom) Roland Carter	4	14	6	2
(Republic of Ireland) Cyril Kemp (Republic of Ireland) George McVeagh	6	12	8	6
(United Kingdom) Henry Billington (South Africa) Norman Farquharson	6	4	4	6	2
(India) Iftikar Ahmed (India) Ghaus Mohammad Khan	3	6	6	3	6
(New Zealand) Busterr Andrews (New Zealand) John Barry	2	3	6	2
(India) Dilip Bose (India) Man Mohan	6	6	3	6

Second round
3	(Australia) G Brown (Australia) C Long	6	6	6
(Sweden) L Bergelin (Sweden) T Johansson	4	4	4
(Denmark) E Bjerre (Hungary) T Frigyesy	1	0	3
(Netherlands) I Rinkel (Netherlands) H van Swol	6	6	6
(South Africa) E Fannin (South Africa) E Sturgess	6	6	6
(Republic of Ireland) C Kemp (Republic of Ireland) G McVeagh	1	2	1
(India) I Ahmed (India) G Mohammad Khan	10	7	3	6
(India) D Bose (India) M Mohan	8	5	6	3

Third round
3	(Australia) G Brown (Australia) C Long	6	6	3	6
(Netherlands) I Rinkel (Netherlands) H van Swol	3	4	6	3
(South Africa) E Fannin (South Africa) E Sturgess	6	6	2	6
(India) I Ahmed (India) G Mohammad Khan	3	4	6	2

Quarterfinals
3	(Australia) G Brown (Australia) C Long	9	5	6	6
(South Africa) E Fannin (South Africa) E Sturgess	7	7	4	3

=== Bottom half ===
==== Section 3 ====
First round
(Poland) Józef Hebda (Poland) Władysław Skonecki	3	6	6	2	6
(United Kingdom) Cyril Betts (United Kingdom) Cliff Hovell	6	2	3	6	3
(Spain) Luis Carles (Spain) Mario Szavoszt	w/o
(Australia) Bob Baker (United Kingdom) Norman Kitovitz
(Argentina) Enrique Morea (Ecuador) Pancho Segura	6	6	7	7
(Australia) Jack Crawford (Australia) Jack Harper	2	4	9	5
(India) Jimmy Mehta (India) Sumant Misra	6	6	6
Q	(United Kingdom) Bernard Neal (United Kingdom) Bobby Thorn	3	2	3
(United Kingdom) George Godsell (Romania) Vinny Rurac	5	5	3
(Austria) Hans Redl (France) Jacques Sanglier	7	7	6
(Belgium) Jacques Brichant (Belgium) Philippe Washer	11	6	5	8
(New Zealand) Owen Bold (New Zealand) Cam Malfroy	9	4	7	6
(United Kingdom) Jimmy Hunt (United Kingdom) Colin Ritchie	5	3	6	8
(Belgium) Pierre Geelhand de Merxem (France) Christian Grandet	7	6	1	10
(United Kingdom) Tony Mottram (Australia) Bill Sidwell	6	2	7	4	6
4	(United States) Tom Brown (United States) Budge Patty	2	6	5	6	4

Second round
(Poland) J Hebda (Poland) W Skonecki	2	8	2	6	3
(Australia) R Baker (United Kingdom) N Kitovitz	6	6	6	4	6
(Argentina) E Morea (Ecuador) P Segura	2	4	6
(India) J Mehta (India) S Misra	6	6	8
(Austria) H Redl (France) J Sanglier	2	2	6	4
(Belgium) J Brichant (Belgium) P Washer	6	6	2	6
(Belgium) P Geelhand de Merxem (France) C Grandet	1	1	3
(United Kingdom) A Mottram (Australia) W Sidwell	6	6	6

Third round
(Australia) R Baker (United Kingdom) N Kitovitz	w/o
(India) J Mehta (India) S Misra
(Belgium) J Brichant (Belgium) P Washer	3	5	3
(United Kingdom) A Mottram (Australia) W Sidwell	6	7	6

Quarterfinals
(India) J Mehta (India) S Misra	6	7	4	4
(United Kingdom) A Mottram (Australia) W Sidwell	2	9	6	6

==== Section 4 ====
First round
(Australia) Alan Coldham (United Kingdom) Henry Weatherall	6	10	6	3	6
(Republic of Ireland) Raymond Egan (South Africa) Eustace Fannin	4	12	3	6	4
(Mandatory Palestine) Mordechai Apel (Mandatory Palestine) Yehuda Finkelkraut	6	6	2	3	3
(United Kingdom) Edmund David (United Kingdom) Herman David	3	4	6	6	6
(Poland) Czesław Spychała (Poland) Ignacy Tłoczyński	4	4	6	5
(Italy) Giovanni Cucelli (Italy) Marcello del Bello	6	6	4	7
(France) Pierre Pellizza (France) Yvon Petra	6	6	6
(United Kingdom) Tommy Anderson (Denmark) Bjørn Hansen	3	2	2
(United Kingdom) Don Butler (United Kingdom) Frank Wilde	1	2	3
(Czechoslovakia) Vladimír Černík (Czechoslovakia) Jaroslav Drobný	6	6	6
(Hungary) József Asbóth (Hungary) András Ádám-Stolpa	6	6	4	6
(United Kingdom) Derek Bull (United Kingdom) CF Duncan	2	2	6	3
(United Kingdom) Guy Cooper (United Kingdom) Ron Tinkler	5	1	3
(Romania) Cristea Caralulis (United Kingdom) Gwyn Tuckett	7	6	6
Q	(United Kingdom) Stan Clark (United Kingdom) Bunny Whiteman	2	0	0
2	(Australia) John Bromwich (Australia) Dinny Pails	6	6	6

Second round
(Australia) A Coldham (United Kingdom) H Weatherall	3	1	4
(United Kingdom) E David (United Kingdom) H David	6	6	6
(Italy) G Cucelli (Italy) M del Bello	3	7	5	6
(France) P Pellizza (France) Y Petra	6	5	7	8
(Czechoslovakia) V Černík (Czechoslovakia) J Drobný	6	7	9
(Hungary) J Asbóth (Hungary) A Ádám-Stolpa	2	5	7
(Romania) C Caralulis (United Kingdom) G Tuckett	1	1	0
2	(Australia) J Bromwich (Australia) D Pails	6	6	6

Third round
(United Kingdom) E David (United Kingdom) H David	2	4	5
(France) P Pellizza (France) Y Petra	6	6	7
(Czechoslovakia) V Černík (Czechoslovakia) J Drobný	2	3	4
2	(Australia) J Bromwich (Australia) D Pails	6	6	6

Quarterfinals
(France) P Pellizza (France) Y Petra	4	9	4
2	(Australia) J Bromwich (Australia) D Pails	6	11	6
