= 1947 Davis Cup Europe Zone =

International tennis competition

Details
- Duration: 2 May 1947 – 15 July 1947
- Teams: 20
- Categories: 1947 Europe Zone; 1947 America Zone

Champion
- Winning nation: Czechoslovakia; Qualified for: 1947 Davis Cup; Inter-Zonal Final

The Europe Zone was one of the two regional zones of the 1947 Davis Cup.

20 teams entered the Europe Zone, with the winner going on to compete in the Inter-Zonal Final against the winner of the America Zone. Czechoslovakia defeated Yugoslavia in the final, and went on to face Australia in the Inter-Zonal Final.

== Draw ==
First Round; 2–4 May
Poland
bye
Great Britain
bye
Netherlands
bye
South Africa
bye
Ireland
bye
Yugoslavia
bye
Belgium	5
Luxembourg	0
Spain	2
Egypt	3
Greece	1
Switzerland	4
Sweden	2
Czechoslovakia	3
bye
Norway
bye
New Zealand
bye
France
bye
India
bye
Monaco
bye
Denmark

Second Round; 15–18 May
Warsaw, Poland (clay)
Poland	2
Great Britain	3
Amsterdam, Netherlands (clay)
Netherlands	1
South Africa	4
Dublin, Ireland (grass)
Ireland	2
Yugoslavia	3
Brussels, Belgium
Belgium	4
Egypt	1
Prague, Czechoslovakia
Switzerland	1
Czechoslovakia	4
Oslo, Norway (clay)
Norway	2
New Zealand	3
Paris, France (clay)
France	5
India	0
Monaco	w/o
Denmark

Quarterfinals; 30 May–1 June
Scarborough, England (grass)
Great Britain	1
South Africa	4
Brussels, Belgium
Yugoslavia	4
Belgium	1
Prague, Czechoslovakia
Czechoslovakia	5
New Zealand	0
Paris, France (clay)
France	5
Monaco	0

Semifinals; 13–16 June
Zagreb, Yugoslavia
South Africa	2
Yugoslavia	3
Prague, Czechoslovakia
Czechoslovakia	4
France	0

Final; 13–15 July
Zagreb, Yugoslavia
Yugoslavia	0
Czechoslovakia	4

== First round ==
=== Belgium vs. Luxembourg ===
Belgium
5
Brussels, Belgium
2–4 May 1947

Luxembourg
0

			1	2	3	4	5
1	(Belgium) (Luxembourg)	Philippe Washer; Géza Wertheim	6; 2	6; 2	6; 1
2	(Belgium) (Luxembourg)	Jacques Peten; Gaston Wampach	4; 6	6; 2	9; 7	3; 6	6; 3
3	(Belgium) (Luxembourg)	Pierre Geelhand de Merxem / Philippe Washer; Gaston Wampach / Géza Wertheim	6; 4	6; 3	6; 2
4	(Belgium) (Luxembourg)	Philippe Washer; Gaston Wampach	7; 5	1; 6	6; 2	6; 2
5	(Belgium) (Luxembourg)	Jacques Peten; Géza Wertheim	6; 2	6; 0	6; 0

=== Spain vs. Egypt ===
Spain
2
Real Club de Tenis Barcelona, Barcelona, Spain
2–4 May 1947
Clay

Egypt
3

			1	2	3	4	5
1	(Spain) (Egypt)	Mario Szavoszt; Andre Najar	3; 6	3; 6	9; 7	6; 3	3; 6
2	(Spain) (Egypt)	Luis Carles; Adli El Shafei	6; 3	3; 6	4; 6	5; 7
3	(Spain) (Egypt)	Jaime Bartroli / Luis Carles; Marcel Coen / Mahmoud Talaat	4; 6	6; 3	3; 6	6; 3	4; 6
4	(Spain) (Egypt)	Jaime Bartroli; Andre Najar	6; 3	6; 1	6; 3
5	(Spain) (Egypt)	Mario Szavoszt; Adli El Shafei	6; 2	3; 6	6; 4	3; 6	6; 4

=== Greece vs. Switzerland ===
Greece
1
Athens, Greece
2–4 May 1947

Switzerland
4

			1	2	3	4	5
1	(Greece) (Switzerland)	Andreas Manuilidis; Jost Spitzer	2; 6	5; 7	1; 6
2	(Greece) (Switzerland)	Lazaros Stalios; Hans Huonder	2; 6	10; 8	6; 3	6; 3
3	(Greece) (Switzerland)	Georgios Nikolaides / Lazaros Stalios; Hans Huonder / Jost Spitzer	7; 5	8; 6	0; 6	7; 9	1; 6
4	(Greece) (Switzerland)	Andreas Manuilidis; Hans Huonder	0; 6	1; 6	1; 6
5	(Greece) (Switzerland)	Lazaros Stalios; Jost Spitzer	6; 1	6; 8	0; 6	1; 6

=== Sweden vs. Czechoslovakia ===
Sweden
2
Malmö Tennisstadion, Malmö, Sweden
2–4 May 1947
Clay

Czechoslovakia
3

			1	2	3	4	5
1	(Sweden) (Czechoslovakia)	Torsten Johansson; Vladimír Černík	7; 5	6; 4	6; 8	6; 2
2	(Sweden) (Czechoslovakia)	Lennart Bergelin; Jaroslav Drobný	6; 4	1; 6	4; 6	4; 6
3	(Sweden) (Czechoslovakia)	Lennart Bergelin / Torsten Johansson; Vladimír Černík / Jaroslav Drobný	1; 6	9; 7	5; 7	2; 6
4	(Sweden) (Czechoslovakia)	Torsten Johansson; Jaroslav Drobný	1; 6	6; 2	3; 6	6; 4	4; 6
5	(Sweden) (Czechoslovakia)	Lennart Bergelin; Vladimír Černík	6; 4	6; 8	6; 1	6; 1

== Second round ==
=== Poland vs. Great Britain ===
Poland
2
Warsaw, Poland
15–17 May 1947
Clay

Great Britain
3

			1	2	3	4	5
1	(Poland) (United Kingdom)	Józef Hebda; Tony Mottram	6; 2	1; 6	1; 6	3; 6
2	(Poland) (United Kingdom)	Władysław Skonecki; Derrick Barton	6; 3	7; 5	13; 11
3	(Poland) (United Kingdom)	Józef Hebda / Władysław Skonecki; Donald Butler / Geoffrey Paish	2; 6	4; 6	3; 6
4	(Poland) (United Kingdom)	Józef Hebda; Derrick Barton	2; 6	6; 3	6; 4	4; 6	6; 4
5	(Poland) (United Kingdom)	Władysław Skonecki; Tony Mottram	4; 6	2; 6	5; 7

=== Netherlands vs. South Africa ===
Netherlands
1
Amsterdam, Netherlands
15–17 May 1947
Clay

South Africa
4

			1	2	3	4	5
1	(Netherlands) (South Africa)	Hubert Wilton; Eric Sturgess	6; 4	1; 6	3; 6	2; 6
2	(Netherlands) (South Africa)	Hans van Swol; Eustace Fannin	6; 3	3; 6	5; 7	2; 6
3	(Netherlands) (South Africa)	Ivo Rinkel / Hans van Swol; Eustace Fannin / Eric Sturgess	6; 3	6; 1	6; 0
4	(Netherlands) (South Africa)	Hans van Swol; Eric Sturgess	2; 6	5; 7	6; 2	3; 6
5	(Netherlands) (South Africa)	Hubert Wilton; Eustace Fannin	9; 7	3; 6	1; 6	3; 6

=== Ireland vs. Yugoslavia ===
Ireland
2
Fitzwilliam Lawn Tennis Club, Dublin, Ireland
16–18 May 1947
Grass

Yugoslavia
3

			1	2	3	4	5
1	(Republic of Ireland) (Socialist Federal Republic of Yugoslavia)	Cyril Kemp; Dragutin Mitić	10; 8	9; 7	3; 6	4; 6	1; 6
2	(Republic of Ireland) (Socialist Federal Republic of Yugoslavia)	Joseph McHale; Josip Palada	3; 6	3; 6	3; 6
3	(Republic of Ireland) (Socialist Federal Republic of Yugoslavia)	Raymond Egan / Cyril Kemp; Dragutin Mitić / Josip Palada	2; 6	4; 6	2; 6
4	(Republic of Ireland) (Socialist Federal Republic of Yugoslavia)	Cyril Kemp; Josip Palada	4; 6	6; 1	6; 0	6; 3
5	(Republic of Ireland) (Socialist Federal Republic of Yugoslavia)	Joseph McHale; Josip Šarić	9; 7	6; 1	7; 5

=== Belgium vs. Egypt ===
Belgium
4
Brussels, Belgium
16–18 May 1947

Egypt
1

			1	2	3	4	5
1	(Belgium) (Egypt)	Pierre Geelhand de Merxem; Andre Najar	4; 6	6; 3	0; 6	6; 3	6; 2
2	(Belgium) (Egypt)	Philippe Washer; Adli El Shafei	6; 2	2; 6	6; 0	8; 6
3	(Belgium) (Egypt)	André Lacroix / Philippe Washer; Marcel Coen / Mahmoud Talaat	6; 4	6; 1	6; 3
4	(Belgium) (Egypt)	Pierre Geelhand de Merxem; Adli El Shafei	4; 6	4; 6	5; 7
5	(Belgium) (Egypt)	Philippe Washer; Andre Najar	6; 2	6; 4	6; 2

=== Czechoslovakia vs. Switzerland ===
Czechoslovakia
4
Prague, Czechoslovakia
16–18 May 1947

Switzerland
1

			1	2	3	4	5
1	(Czechoslovakia) (Switzerland)	Jaroslav Drobný; Hans Huonder	6; 1	6; 1	6; 1
2	(Czechoslovakia) (Switzerland)	Vladimír Černík; Jost Spitzer	2; 6	6; 4	6; 0	5; 7	1; 6
3	(Czechoslovakia) (Switzerland)	Vladimír Černík / Jaroslav Drobný; Hans Pfaff / Jost Spitzer	6; 1	6; 2	6; 3
4	(Czechoslovakia) (Switzerland)	Vladimír Černík; Hans Huonder	6; 3	6; 3	6; 4
5	(Czechoslovakia) (Switzerland)	Jaroslav Drobný; Jost Spitzer	6; 2	6; 1	6; 2

=== Norway vs. New Zealand ===
Norway
2
Oslo, Norway
16–18 May 1947
Clay

New Zealand
3

			1	2	3	4	5
1	(Norway) (New Zealand)	Johan Haanes; John Barry	6; 0	7; 5	6; 4
2	(Norway) (New Zealand)	Jan Staubo; Ron McKenzie	6; 2	6; 3	3; 6	6; 2
3	(Norway) (New Zealand)	Birger Andersen-Brem / Johan Haanes; Ron McKenzie / Jeff Robson	6; 4	4; 6	4; 6	2; 6
4	(Norway) (New Zealand)	Jan Staubo; John Barry	6; 4	5; 7	6; 3	5; 7	2; 6
5	(Norway) (New Zealand)	Johan Haanes; Ron McKenzie	4; 6	6; 0	3; 6	7; 9

=== France vs. India ===
France
5
Stade Roland Garros, Paris, France
16–18 May 1947
Clay

India
0

			1	2	3	4	5
1	(France) (India)	Bernard Destremau; Sumant Misra	6; 0	6; 3	6; 3
2	(France) (India)	Marcel Bernard; Ghaus Mohammad Khan	6; 3	6; 2	6; 0
3	(France) (India)	Marcel Bernard / Pierre Pellizza; Jimmy Mehta / Sumant Misra	6; 3	6; 2	6; 3
4	(France) (India)	Marcel Bernard; Sumant Misra	6; 4	6; 3	6; 1
5	(France) (India)	Bernard Destremau; Dilip Bose	6; 0	6; 1	6; 2

== Quarterfinals ==
=== Great Britain vs. South Africa ===
Great Britain
1
Yorkshire Lawn Tennis Club, Scarborough, England
30 May–1 June 1947
Grass

South Africa
4

			1	2	3	4	5
1	(United Kingdom) (South Africa)	Tony Mottram; Eric Sturgess	7; 5	2; 6	1; 6	3; 6
2	(United Kingdom) (South Africa)	Donald Butler; Eustace Fannin	4; 6	6; 4	7; 9	3; 3		retired
3	(United Kingdom) (South Africa)	Tony Mottram / Geoffrey Paish; Eustace Fannin / Eric Sturgess	1; 6	6; 4	6; 2	3; 6	4; 6
4	(United Kingdom) (South Africa)	Donald Butler; Eric Sturgess	1; 6	1; 6	0; 6
5	(United Kingdom) (South Africa)	Tony Mottram; Eustace Fannin	6; 4	5; 7	6; 2	7; 5

=== Belgium vs. Yugoslavia ===
Belgium
1
Brussels, Belgium
30 May–1 June 1947

Yugoslavia
4

			1	2	3	4	5
1	(Belgium) (Socialist Federal Republic of Yugoslavia)	Philippe Washer; Dragutin Mitić	6; 4	6; 3	1; 6	6; 3
2	(Belgium) (Socialist Federal Republic of Yugoslavia)	Pierre Geelhand de Merxem; Josip Palada	1; 6	6; 4	3; 6	3; 6
3	(Belgium) (Socialist Federal Republic of Yugoslavia)	André Lacroix / Philippe Washer; Dragutin Mitić / Josip Palada	6; 2	6; 1	2; 6	1; 6	2; 6
4	(Belgium) (Socialist Federal Republic of Yugoslavia)	Pierre Geelhand de Merxem; Dragutin Mitić	0; 6	3; 6	4; 6
5	(Belgium) (Socialist Federal Republic of Yugoslavia)	Philippe Washer; Josip Palada	3; 6	2; 6	0; 6

=== Czechoslovakia vs. New Zealand ===
Czechoslovakia
5
Prague, Czechoslovakia
30 May–1 June 1947

New Zealand
0

			1	2	3	4	5
1	(Czechoslovakia) (New Zealand)	Jaroslav Drobný; Jeff Robson	6; 2	6; 2	8; 6
2	(Czechoslovakia) (New Zealand)	Vladimír Černík; Ron McKenzie	6; 3	6; 4	7; 5
3	(Czechoslovakia) (New Zealand)	Vladimír Černík / Jaroslav Drobný; Ron McKenzie / Jeff Robson	6; 2	4; 6	9; 7	3; 6	10; 8
4	(Czechoslovakia) (New Zealand)	Vladimír Černík; Jeff Robson	6; 3	6; 0	6; 0
5	(Czechoslovakia) (New Zealand)	Ferdinand Vrba; John Barry	6; 4	6; 2	6; 2

=== France vs. Monaco ===
France
5
Stade Roland Garros, Paris, France
30 May–1 June 1947
Clay

Monaco
0

			1	2	3	4	5
1	(France) (Monaco)	Marcel Bernard; Aleco Noghès	6; 1	6; 2	6; 0
2	(France) (Monaco)	Bernard Destremau; Vladimir Landau	6; 3	6; 2	6; 1
3	(France) (Monaco)	Robert Abdesselam / Pierre Pellizza; Vladimir Landau / Gaston Médécin	6; 2	6; 1	6; 0
4	(France) (Monaco)	Robert Abdesselam; Vladimir Landau	6; 2	6; 1	6; 0
5	(France) (Monaco)	Bernard Destremau; Aleco Noghès	7; 5	6; 2	6; 1

== Semifinals ==
=== Yugoslavia vs. South Africa ===
Yugoslavia
3
Zagreb, Yugoslavia
13–15 June 1947

South Africa
2

			1	2	3	4	5
1	(Socialist Federal Republic of Yugoslavia) (South Africa)	Dragutin Mitić; Eric Sturgess	3; 6	7; 5	6; 2	3; 6	6; 3
2	(Socialist Federal Republic of Yugoslavia) (South Africa)	Josip Palada; Eustace Fannin	6; 1	6; 4	7; 5
3	(Socialist Federal Republic of Yugoslavia) (South Africa)	Dragutin Mitić / Josip Palada; Eustace Fannin / Eric Sturgess	3; 6	5; 7	5; 7
4	(Socialist Federal Republic of Yugoslavia) (South Africa)	Josip Palada; Eric Sturgess	6; 3	3; 6	0; 6	7; 5	3; 6
5	(Socialist Federal Republic of Yugoslavia) (South Africa)	Dragutin Mitić; Eustace Fannin	6; 2	6; 3	6; 4

=== Czechoslovakia vs. France ===
Czechoslovakia
4
Prague, Czechoslovakia
14–16 June 1947

France
0

			1	2	3	4	5
1	(Czechoslovakia) (France)	Vladimír Černík; Marcel Bernard	2; 6	9; 7	6; 4	4; 6	6; 4
2	(Czechoslovakia) (France)	Jaroslav Drobný; Bernard Destremau	6; 2	6; 0	6; 1
3	(Czechoslovakia) (France)	Vladimír Černík / Jaroslav Drobný; Jean Borotra / Yvon Petra	10; 8	14; 12	6; 3
4	(Czechoslovakia) (France)	Jaroslav Drobný; Marcel Bernard	6; 3	2; 6	6; 4	4; 6	6; 4
5	(Czechoslovakia) (France)	Vladimír Černík; Bernard Destremau						not played

== Final ==
=== Yugoslavia vs. Czechoslovakia ===
Yugoslavia
0
Zagreb, Yugoslavia
13–15 July 1947

Czechoslovakia
4

			1	2	3	4	5
1	(Socialist Federal Republic of Yugoslavia) (Czechoslovakia)	Dragutin Mitić; Vladimír Černík	6; 3	0; 6	6; 2	1; 6	2; 6
2	(Socialist Federal Republic of Yugoslavia) (Czechoslovakia)	Josip Palada; Jaroslav Drobný	3; 6	6; 8	6; 2	3; 6
3	(Socialist Federal Republic of Yugoslavia) (Czechoslovakia)	Dragutin Mitić / Josip Palada; Vladimír Černík / Jaroslav Drobný	3; 6	1; 6	3; 6
4	(Socialist Federal Republic of Yugoslavia) (Czechoslovakia)	Dragutin Mitić; Jaroslav Drobný	6; 1	3; 6	4; 6	6; 4	1; 6
5	(Socialist Federal Republic of Yugoslavia) (Czechoslovakia)	Josip Palada; Ján Smolinský						not played
