= 1947 French Championships – Men's singles =

Men's singles
- 1947 French Championships

Final
- Champion: (Hungary) József Asbóth
- Runner-up: (South Africa) Eric Sturgess
- Score: 8–6, 7–5, 6–4

Details
- Seeds: 16

Events
| Singles | men | women |
| Doubles | men | women |
| ← 1946 · | French Championships | · 1948 → |

József Asbóth defeated Eric Sturgess 8–6, 7–5, 6–4 in the final to win the men's singles tennis title at the 1947 French Championships.

== Seeds ==
The seeded players are listed below. József Asbóth is the champion; at others the round is shown in which they were eliminated.

1. (United States) Tom Brown (semifinals)
2. (United States) Budge Patty (fourth round)
3. (France) Marcel Bernard (semifinals)
4. (France) Yvon Petra (quarterfinals)
5. (Hungary) József Asbóth (champion)
6. (Italy) Giovanni Cucelli (quarterfinals)
7. (South Africa) Eric Sturgess (finalist)
8. (Argentina) Enrique Morea (third round)
9. (Italy) Marcello Del Bello (third round)
10. (Australia) William Sidwell (third round)
11. (France) Robert Abdesselam (fourth round)
12. (Italy) Mario Belardinelli (fourth round)
13. (Czechoslovakia) Vladimír Černík (second round)
14. (South Africa) Eustace Fannin (third round)
15. (United Kingdom) Geoffrey Paish (second round)
16. (United Kingdom) Tony Mottram (fourth round)

== Draw ==
=== Key ===
- Q = Qualifier
- WC = Wild card
- LL = Lucky loser
- r = Retired

=== Finals ===
Quarterfinals
1 | (United States) Tom Brown | 7 | 6 | 6
(France) Pierre Pellizza | 5 | 1 | 2
4 | (France) Yvon Petra | 6 | 3 | 1 | 2
5 | (Hungary) József Asbóth | 4 | 6 | 6 | 6
6 | (Italy) Giovanni Cucelli | 4 | 2 | 6 | 6 | 4
3 | (France) Marcel Bernard | 6 | 6 | 0 | 3 | 6
7 | (South Africa) Eric Sturgess | 6 | 6 | 6
(Hungary) András Ádám-Stolpa | 4 | 3 | 2

Semifinals
1 | (United States) Tom Brown | 2 | 2 | 1
5 | (Hungary) József Asbóth | 6 | 6 | 6
3 | (France) Marcel Bernard | 6 | 6 | 3 | 6 | 3
7 | (South Africa) Eric Sturgess | 3 | 2 | 6 | 8 | 6

Final
5 | (Hungary) József Asbóth | 8 | 7 | 6
7 | (South Africa) Eric Sturgess | 6 | 5 | 4

=== Earlier rounds ===
==== Section 1 ====
First round

Second round
1 | (United States) Tom Brown
(France) Raymond Rodel
(France) Christian Grandet | 6 | 1 | 6 | 1 | 4
(Netherlands) A.M. Borren | 3 | 6 | 1 | 6 | 6
16 | (United Kingdom) Tony Mottram | 6 | 6 | 7
(Switzerland) Jost Spitzer | 2 | 1 | 5
(Czechoslovakia) Ferdinand Vrba | 6 | 6 | 2 | 4 | 2
(Romania) Christea Caralulis | 0 | 3 | 6 | 6 | 6

Third round
1 | (United States) Brown | 9 | 6 | 6
(Netherlands) Borren | 7 | 1 | 1
16 | (United Kingdom) Mottram | 6 | 4 | 6 | 8
(Romania) Caralulis | 3 | 6 | 1 | 6

Fourth round
1 | (United States) Brown | 8 | 6 | 6 | 4 | 6
16 | (United Kingdom) Mottram | 6 | 8 | 4 | 6 | 3

==== Section 2 ====
First round

Second round
8 | (Argentina) Enrique Morea | 6 | 7 | 8
(France) André Jaquemet | 2 | 5 | 6
(France) Pierre Pellizza | 6 | 6 | 6
(New Zealand) Ron McKenzie | 4 | 0 | 2
9 | (Italy) Marcello Del Bello | 6 | 6 | 6
(France) Roger Dubuc | 3 | 3 | 1
(Hungary) Emil Szentpétery | 6 | 6 | 3 | 2 | 1
(Belgium) Philippe Washer | 4 | 4 | 6 | 6 | 6

Third round
8 | (Argentina) Morea | 7 | 5 | 6
(France) Pellizza | 9 | 7 | 8
9 | (Italy) Del Bello | 5 | 3 | 4
(Belgium) Washer | 7 | 6 | 6

Fourth round
(France) Pellizza | 6 | 9 | 7
(Belgium) Washer | 0 | 7 | 5

==== Section 3 ====
First round
(France) Paul Zhendre
(France) Bernard Lucot
(France) Paul Rémy | 2 | 1 | 1
(Italy) Carletto Sada | 6 | 6 | 6

Second round
4 | (France) Yvon Petra | 6 | 6 | 6
(France) Benny Berthet | 3 | 4 | 0
(United Kingdom) Paddy Roberts | 2 | 3 | 5
(France) Christian Boussus | 6 | 6 | 7
13 | (Czechoslovakia) Vladimír Černík
(Hungary) Tibor Frigyesy
(France) Lucot | 0 | 3 | 2
(Italy) Sada | 6 | 6 | 6

Third round
4 | (France) Petra | 3 | 6 | 7 | 9
(France) Boussus | 6 | 4 | 5 | 7
(Hungary) Frigyesy | 3 | 0 | 4
(Italy) Sada | 6 | 6 | 6

Fourth round
4 | (France) Petra | 6 | 6 | 6
(Italy) Sada | 1 | 4 | 2

==== Section 4 ====
First round
12 | (Italy) Mario Belardinelli | 2 | 6 | 4 | 6 | 6
(France) Robert Billaudot | 6 | 4 | 6 | 1 | 2
(France) Guy Delhomme | 4 | 6 | 1 | 2
(Belgium) Ivan Devroe | 6 | 4 | 6 | 6
(Argentina) L. Morea | 4 | 3 | 1
(France) Franþois Terrier | 6 | 6 | 6
(France) Robert Laval | 3 | 2 | 1
(France) Jean Ducos De La Haille | 6 | 6 | 6
(France) Antoine Gentien
5 | (Hungary) József Asbóth
(United Kingdom) George E. Godsell | 3 | 8 | 6 | 3 | 0r
(Tunisia) Gilbert Naccache | 6 | 6 | 2 | 6 | 2
(Monaco) Gaston Medecin | 3 | 6 | 6 | 1 | 6
(France) Philippe Chatrier | 6 | 3 | 4 | 6 | 8
(France) Jacques Malosse | 7 | 2 | 3
(Italy) Rolando Del Bello | 9 | 6 | 6

Second round
12 | (Italy) Belardinelli | 11 | 6 | 8
(Belgium) Devroe | 9 | 1 | 6
(France) Terrier | 8 | 5 | 1 | 4
(France) Ducos De La Haille | 6 | 7 | 6 | 6
5 | (Hungary) Asbóth | 6 | 6 | 6
(Tunisia) Naccache | 0 | 3 | 2
(France) Chatrier | 1 | 1 | 2
(Italy) Del Bello | 6 | 6 | 6

Third round
12 | (Italy) Belardinelli | 6 | 6 | 6
(France) Ducos De La Haille | 3 | 3 | 1
5 | (Hungary) Asbóth | 6 | 6 | 6
(Italy) Del Bello | 2 | 3 | 1

Fourth round
12 | (Italy) Belardinelli | 2 | 2 | 5
5 | (Hungary) Asbóth | 6 | 6 | 7

==== Section 5 ====
First round
(France) Patrick Tiberghien
(Italy) Renato Bossi
(France) Paul Jalabert | 6 | 6 | 5 | 1
(France) Robert Colin | 8 | 4 | 7 | 6
(France) Jacques Freling | 6 | 6 | 7 | 2
(France) Roger Dessair | 2 | 8 | 9 | 6
(France) André Favières | 4 | 4 | 1
11 | (France) Robert Abdesselam | 6 | 6 | 6
(Luxembourg) Gaston Wampach
(Australia) Jack Crawford
(France) Jacques Iemetti
(Egypt) Andre Najar
(France) Marcel Schaff | 3 | 0 | 6
(France) Roland Journu | 6 | 6 | 8
(France) Louis Chevallier | 6 | 0 | 1 | 4
6 | (Italy) Giovanni Cucelli | 4 | 6 | 6 | 6

Second round
(Italy) Bossi | 6 | 3 | 3 | 5
(France) Colin | 0 | 6 | 6 | 7
(France) Dessair | 8 | 2 | 2 | 4
11 | (France) Abdesselam | 6 | 6 | 6 | 6
(Australia) Crawford | 6 | 6 | 6
(Egypt) Najar | 4 | 2 | 2
(France) Journu | 2 | 2 | 1
6 | (Italy) Cucelli | 6 | 6 | 6

Third round
(France) Colin | 6 | 4 | 6 | 6 | 1
11 | (France) Abdesselam | 2 | 6 | 3 | 8 | 6
(Australia) Crawford | 1 | 4 | 3
6 | (Italy) Cucelli | 6 | 6 | 6

Fourth round
11 | (France) Abdesselam | 6 | 3 | 5 | 5
6 | (Italy) Cucelli | 3 | 6 | 7 | 7

==== Section 6 ====
First round
(France) Andrú Poulailion | 4 | 1 | 3
(France) Bernard Destremau | 6 | 6 | 6
(United States) William Robertson | 3 | 2 | 1
(Belgium) Jacques Peten | 6 | 6 | 6
(United Kingdom) Derrick Barton | 5 | 3 | 0
(France) Jacques Jamain | 7 | 6 | 6

Second round
(France) Destremau | 2 | 2 | 1
(Belgium) Peten | 6 | 6 | 6
(France) Jamain | 7 | 0 | 4 | 3
14 | (South Africa) Fannin | 5 | 6 | 6 | 6
(New Zealand) Jeff Robson | 1 | 2 | 1
(France) Paul Feret | 6 | 6 | 6
(France) Jacques Sanglier | 0 | 4 | 1
3 | (France) Marcel Bernard | 6 | 6 | 6

Third round
(Belgium) Peten | 6 | 6 | 6
14 | (South Africa) Fannin | 2 | 4 | 3
(France) Feret | 3 | 3 | 6 | 3
3 | (France) Bernard | 6 | 6 | 4 | 6

Fourth round
(Belgium) Peten | 3 | 2 | 3
3 | (France) Bernard | 6 | 6 | 6

==== Section 7 ====
First round

Second round
(Poland) Władysław Skonecki
(Italy) Ferruccio Quintavalle
(France) André Merlin
10 | (Australia) William Sidwell
(France) Henri Bolelli | 6 | 3 | 0 | 6 | 2
(Romania) Vinicius Rurac | 1 | 6 | 6 | 4 | 6
(France) Georges Gremillet | 1 | 3 | 4
7 | (South Africa) Eric W. Sturgess | 6 | 6 | 6

Third round
(Italy) Quintavalle
10 | (Australia) Sidwell
(Romania) Rurac | 0 | 2 | 6 | 1
7 | (South Africa) Sturgess | 6 | 6 | 1 | 6

Fourth round
(Italy) Quintavalle | 5 | 1 | 0
7 | (South Africa) Sturgess | 7 | 6 | 6

==== Section 8 ====
First round

Second round
(Belgium) Pierre Geelhand De Merxem | 7 | 6 | 0 | 2
(Hungary) András Ádám-Stolpa | 5 | 3 | 6 | 6
15 | (United Kingdom) Geoffrey Paish | 6 | 8 | 4 | 7 | 1
(France) Henri Pellizza | 1 | 6 | 6 | 9 | 6
(Egypt) Henry Zalzal | 4 | 6 | 2 | 1
(France) Jacques Thomas | 6 | 4 | 6 | 6
(New Zealand) John Barry | 6 | 5 | 3 | 7 | 4
2 | (United States) Budge Patty | 3 | 7 | 6 | 5 | 6

Third round
(Hungary) Ádám-Stolpa | 6 | 6 | 4 | 7
(France) Pellizza | 2 | 4 | 6 | 5
(France) Thomas | 4 | 4 | 4
2 | (United States) Patty | 6 | 6 | 6

Fourth round
(Hungary) Ádám-Stolpa | 7 | 6 | 8 | 6
2 | (United States) Patty | 9 | 3 | 6 | 2

| Preceded by 1947 Wimbledon Championships – Men's singles | Grand Slam men's singles | Succeeded by 1947 U.S. National Championships – Men's singles |
