= 1947 Wimbledon Championships =

- Date: 23 June – 5 July
- Edition: 61st
- Category: Grand Slam
- Surface: Grass
- Location: Church Road; SW19, Wimbledon, London, United Kingdom
- Venue: All England Lawn Tennis and Croquet Club

Champions

Men's singles
- (United States) Jack Kramer

Women's singles
- (United States) Margaret Osborne

Men's doubles
- (United States) Bob Falkenburg / (United States) Jack Kramer

Women's doubles
- (United States) Doris Hart / (United States) Patricia Todd

Mixed doubles
- (United States) Louise Brough / (Australia) John Bromwich

Boys' singles
- (Denmark) Kurt Nielsen

Girls' singles
- (Belgium) Geneviève Domken
← 1946 ·	Wimbledon Championships	· 1948 →

The 1947 Wimbledon Championships took place on the outdoor grass courts at the All England Lawn Tennis and Croquet Club in Wimbledon, London, United Kingdom. The tournament was held from Monday 23 June until Saturday 5 July 1947. It was the 61st staging of the Wimbledon Championships. In 1947, as in 1946, Wimbledon was held before the French Championships and was thus the second Grand Slam tennis event of the year. Jack Kramer and Margaret Osborne won the singles titles.

== Finals ==
=== Seniors ===
==== Men's singles ====
(United States) Jack Kramer defeated (United States) Tom Brown, 6–1, 6–3, 6–2

==== Women's singles ====
(United States) Margaret Osborne defeated (United States) Doris Hart, 6–2, 6–4

==== Men's doubles ====
(United States) Bob Falkenburg / (United States) Jack Kramer defeated (United Kingdom) Tony Mottram / (Australia) Bill Sidwell, 8–6, 6–3, 6–3

==== Women's doubles ====
(United States) Doris Hart / (United States) Patricia Todd defeated (United States) Louise Brough / (United States) Margaret Osborne, 3–6, 6–4, 7–5

==== Mixed doubles ====
(Australia) John Bromwich / (United States) Louise Brough defeated (Australia) Colin Long / (Australia) Nancye Wynne Bolton, 1–6, 6–4, 6–2

=== Juniors ===
==== Boys' singles ====
(Denmark) Kurt Nielsen defeated (Sweden) Sven Davidson, 8–6, 6–1, 9–7

==== Girls' singles ====
(Belgium) Geneviève Domken defeated (Sweden) Birgit Wallén, 6–1, 6–4

Preceded by 1947 Australian Championships	Grand Slams	Succeeded by 1947 French Championships
