= Headley Baxter =

British tennis player and coach (1919–2004)

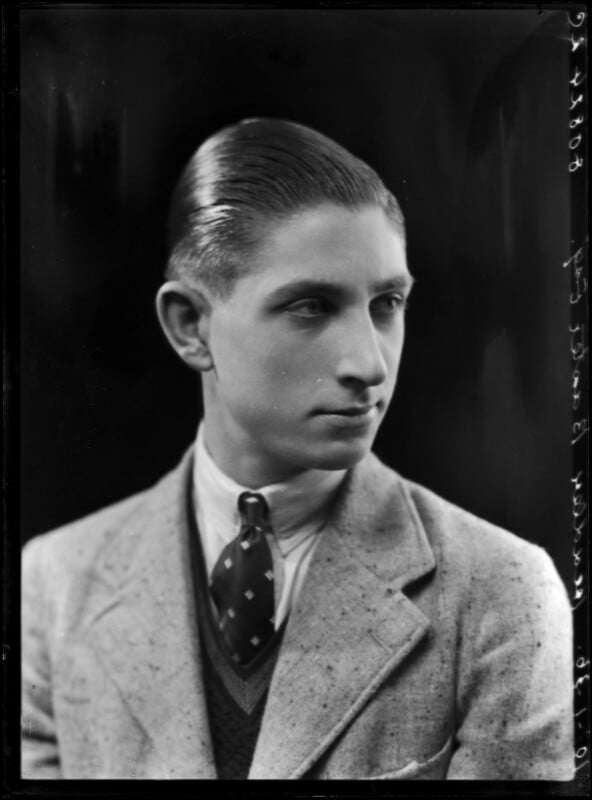
- Baxter in 1936
- Full name: Headley Thomas Baxter
- Country (sports): United Kingdom
- Born: 29 March 1919
- Died: 31 August 2004 (aged 85)
- Turned pro: 1938 (amateur tour)
- Retired: 1953

Singles
- Career record: 58–41
- Career titles: 6

Grand Slam singles results
- French Open: 2R (1948)
- Wimbledon: 3R (1947)

Grand Slam doubles results
- Wimbledon: 2R (1939, 48, 49, 51, 53)

Grand Slam mixed doubles results
- Wimbledon: 4R (1952)

Headley Thomas Baxter (29 March 1919 – 31 August 2004) was a British tennis player and coach. He was active from 1939 to 1953 and contested 10 career singles finals and won 6 titles.

== Career ==
A native of Middlesex, Baxter was the British junior champion in 1935 and 1936. He played his first senior event in 1938 at the Worthing Open where he reached the final, before losing to Alan Brown. In 1939 he won his first singles title at the Cranleigh Open against Guy Cooper.

He won through to the singles third round of the 1947 Wimbledon Championships and took a set off third seed Tom Brown before being eliminated. During his playing career he was a member of British Davis Cup teams but was never called upon for a rubber.

His career singles highlights include winning the Berkshire Championships three times in 1939, 1946 and 1947. He also won the Cumberland Hard Court Championships in 1948 against Dennis Slack. In addition he was also a losing finalist at the Norfolk Championships in 1948 to Clifford Hovell, the Paddington Hard Court tournament in 1949 to Roland Carter and again in 1951 to Tony Starte, the Southdean Hard Court Championships in 1951 on clay courts where he lost to Paddy Roberts.

He also took part in the 1948 French Championships where he lost in the second round to Dragutin Mitic. Baxter won his final singles title at the final edition of the Middlesex Championships in 1949 against Cliff Hovell. He played his final tournament at the 1953 Wimbledon Championships.

Baxter served as non-playing Davis Cup captain for Great Britain from 1962 to 1967, and again from 1968 to 1971, with both tenures proving largely unsuccessful. He resigned in 1967 citing business commitments, but returned to the role the following year after his replacement, Peter Hare, stepped down due to ill health.
