= 1947 Wimbledon Championships – Boys' singles =

Boys' singles
- 1947 Wimbledon Championships

Final
- Champion: (Denmark) Kurt Nielsen
- Runner-up: (Sweden) Sven Davidson
- Score: 8–6, 6–1, 9–7

Events
Singles	men	women		boys	girls
Doubles	men	women	mixed	boys	girls
Wimbledon Championships	· 1948 →

Kurt Nielsen defeated Sven Davidson in the final, 8–6, 6–1, 9–7 to win the inaugural Boys' Singles tennis title at the 1947 Wimbledon Championships.

== Draw ==
=== Key ===
- Q = Qualifier
- WC = Wild card
- LL = Lucky loser
- Alt = Alternate
- SE = Special exempt
- PR = Protected ranking
- ITF = ITF entry
- JE = Junior exempt
- w/o = Walkover
- r = Retired
- d = Defaulted
- SR = Special ranking

=== Final ===
Final
(Denmark) Kurt Nielsen	8	6	9
(Sweden) Sven Davidson	6	1	7

=== Group A ===
	(Denmark) Nielsen	(Belgium) Mortlet	(France) Nys	(Switzerland) Balestra	(Czechoslovakia) Becka	RR; W–L	Set; W–L	Game; W–L	Standings
(Denmark) Kurt Nielsen		6–3	6–3	5–4	5–4	4–0	4–0	22–14	1
(Belgium) Mortlet	3–6		3–6	5–4	4–5	1–3	1–3	15–21	4
(France) Francis Nys	3–6	6–3		6–3	2–7	2–2	2–2	17–19	3
(Switzerland) Erwin Balestra	4–5	4–5	3–6		1–8	0–4	0–4	12–24	5
(Czechoslovakia) Jaromir Becka	4–5	5–4	7–2	8–1		3–1	3–1	24–12	2

=== Group B ===
	(Sweden) Davidson	(United Kingdom) Roberts	(Netherlands) Lathouwers	Rudd	(Switzerland) Huguson	RR; W–L	Set; W–L	Game; W–L	Standings
(Sweden) Sven Davidson		5–4	8–1	7–2	5–4	4–0	4–0	25–11	1
(United Kingdom) Paddy Roberts	4–5		9–0	9–0	6–3	3–1	3–1	28–8	2
(Netherlands) Lathouwers	1–8	0–9		2–7	2–7	0–4	0–4	5–31	5
JE Rudd	2–7	0–9	7–2		5–4	2–2	2–2	14–22	3
(Switzerland) Huguson	4–5	2–6	7–2	4–5		1–3	1–3	18–18	4

The nationality of JE Rudd is unknown.
