= 1947 Wimbledon Championships – Girls' singles =

Girls' singles
- 1947 Wimbledon Championships

Final
- Champion: (Belgium) Geneviève Domken
- Runner-up: (Sweden) Birgit Wallen
- Score: 6–1, 6–4

Events
| Singles | men | women | | boys | girls |
| Doubles | men | women | mixed | boys | girls |
- Wimbledon Championships

Geneviève Domken defeated B Wallen in the final, 6–1, 6–4 to win the inaugural Girls' Singles tennis title at the 1947 Wimbledon Championships.

== Draw ==
Key

- Q = Qualifier
- WC = Wild card
- LL = Lucky loser
- Alt = Alternate
- ITF = ITF entry
- PR = Protected ranking
- SR = Special ranking
- SE = Special exempt
- JE = Junior exempt
- JR = Junior Accelerator Programme entrant
- CO = College Accelerator Programme entrant
- NG = Next Gen Accelerator Program entrant
- w/o = Walkover
- r = Retired
- d = Defaulted

=== Final ===
| Final |
| (Belgium) Geneviève Domken | 6 | 6 |
| (Sweden) Birgit Wallen | 1 | 4 |

=== Group A ===
| | (Belgium) G Domken | (Switzerland) Fery | (Belgium) D Holter Sorensen | (Greece) M Akrivou | RR; W–L | Set; W–L | Game; W–L | Standings |
| (Belgium) Geneviève Domken | | 5–4 | 6–3 | 8–1 | 3–0 | 3–0 | 19–8 | 1 |
| (Switzerland) Miss Fery | 4–5 | | 6–3 | 8–1 | 2–1 | 2–1 | 18–9 | 2 |
| (Belgium) D Holter Sorensen | 3–6 | 3–6 | | 6–3 | 1–2 | 1–2 | 12–15 | 3 |
| (Greece) M Akrivou | 1–8 | 1–8 | 3–6 | | 0–4 | 0–4 | 5–22 | 4 |

=== Group B ===
| | (Sweden) B Wallen | (Greece) Voultzos | (Netherlands) Vorenkamp | (Denmark) Henriksen | RR; W–L | Set; W–L | Game; W–L | Standings |
| (Sweden) Birgit Wallen | | 5–4 | 8–1 | 6–3 | 3–0 | 3–0 | 19–8 | 1 |
| (Greece) Miss Voultzos | 4–5 | | 5–4 | 7–2 | 2–1 | 2–1 | 16–11 | 2 |
| (Netherlands) Miss Vorenkamp | 1–8 | 4–5 | | 4–5 | 0–3 | 0–3 | 9–18 | 4 |
| (Denmark) Miss Henriksen | 3–6 | 2–7 | 5–4 | | 1–2 | 1–2 | 10–17 | 3 |
