= 1947 Wimbledon Championships – Women's doubles =

Tennis tournament

Women's doubles
- 1947 Wimbledon Championships

Final
- Champions: (United States) Doris Hart (United States) Pat Todd
- Runners-up: (United States) Louise Brough (United States) Margaret Osborne
- Score: 3–6, 6–4, 7–5

Details
- Draw: 40 (5 Q )
- Seeds: 4

Events
Singles	men	women		boys	girls
Doubles	men	women	mixed	boys	girls
← 1946 ·	Wimbledon Championships	· 1948 →

Doris Hart and Pat Todd defeated the defending champions Louise Brough and Margaret Osborne in the final, 3–6, 6–4, 7–5 to win the ladies' doubles tennis title at the 1947 Wimbledon Championships.

== Seeds ==
1. (United States) Louise Brough / (United States) Margaret Osborne (final)
2. (United States) Doris Hart / (United States) Pat Todd (champions)
3. (United Kingdom) Jean Bostock / (United Kingdom) Betty Hilton (semifinals)
4. (Australia) Nancye Bolton / (United States) Nell Hopman (quarterfinals)

Click on the seed number of a player to go to their draw section.

== Draw ==
=== Key ===
- Q = Qualifier
- WC = Wild card
- LL = Lucky loser
- Alt = Alternate
- SE = Special exempt
- PR = Protected ranking
- ITF = ITF entry
- JE = Junior exempt
- w/o = Walkover
- r = Retired
- d = Defaulted
- SR = Special ranking

=== Finals ===
Quarterfinals
2	(United States) Doris Hart (United States) Pat Todd	6	6
(United Kingdom) Ermyntrude Harvey (United Kingdom) Joan Ingram	3	4
3	(United Kingdom) Jean Bostock (United Kingdom) Betty Hilton	6	9
(South Africa) Dorothy Muller (South Africa) Sheila Summers	3	7
(United Kingdom) Molly Blair (United Kingdom) Kay Menzies	6	6
4	(Australia) Nancye Bolton (Australia) Nell Hopman	3	3
(United Kingdom) Anita Ellis (Poland) Jadwiga Jędrzejowska	1	3
1	(United States) Louise Brough (United States) Margaret Osborne	6	6

Semifinals
2	(United States) Doris Hart (United States) Pat Todd	6	6
3	(United Kingdom) Jean Bostock (United Kingdom) Betty Hilton	0	1
(United Kingdom) Molly Blair (United Kingdom) Kay Menzies	2	1
1	(United States) Louise Brough (United States) Margaret Osborne	6	6

Final
2	(United States) Doris Hart (United States) Pat Todd	3	6	7
1	(United States) Louise Brough (United States) Margaret Osborne	6	4	5

=== Top half ===
==== Section 1 ====
First round

Second round
2	(United States) Doris Hart (United States) Pat Todd	6	6
(United Kingdom) Peggy Knight (United Kingdom) Enid Sutton	4	1
(United Kingdom) Joy Gannon (United Kingdom) Jean Quertier	4	6	6
Q	(United Kingdom) Betty Coutts (United Kingdom) Jean Walker-Smith	6	1	1
(United Kingdom) Valerie Cooper (United Kingdom) Margot Parker	6	3	6
(United Kingdom) Ermyntrude Harvey (United Kingdom) Joan Ingram	3	6	8
(Czechoslovakia) Helena Straubeová (Switzerland) Luzia Studer
Q	(United Kingdom) Lalage Churcher (United Kingdom) Kay Tuckey	w/o

Third round
2	(United States) D Hart (United States) P Todd	6	6
(United Kingdom) J Gannon (United Kingdom) J Quertier	3	4
(United Kingdom) E Harvey (United Kingdom) J Ingram
(Czechoslovakia) H Straubeová (Switzerland) L Studer	w/o

Quarterfinals
2	(United States) D Hart (United States) P Todd	6	6
(United Kingdom) E Harvey (United Kingdom) J Ingram	3	4

==== Section 2 ====
First round
(United Kingdom) Gladys Lines (United Kingdom) Pearl Panton	5	6	3
(United Kingdom) Rosemary Morris (United Kingdom) Wendy Stork	7	0	6
(United Kingdom) Elsie Hamilton (United Kingdom) Vera Dace	3	6	6
(United Kingdom) Gay Chandler (United Kingdom) Thelma Lister	6	3	4
(United Kingdom) Joy Hibbert (United Kingdom) Edith Middleton	2	3
(South Africa) Dorothy Muller (South Africa) Sheila Summers	6	6
BM Crosoer (United Kingdom) Katie Whitefield	1	2
(France) Simonne Mathieu (Luxembourg) Alice Weiwers	6	6

Second round
3	(United Kingdom) Jean Bostock (United Kingdom) Betty Hilton	6	6
(Australia) Joan Bathurst (United Kingdom) Susan Powell	1	3
(United Kingdom) Katherine Keith-Steele (Republic of Ireland) Betty Lombard	6	7	6
Q	(United Kingdom) Molly James (United Kingdom) Nancy Liebert	3	9	4
(United Kingdom) R Morris (United Kingdom) W Stork	2	6	3
(United Kingdom) E Hamilton (United Kingdom) V Dace	6	4	6
(South Africa) D Muller (South Africa) S Summers	6	6
(France) S Mathieu (Luxembourg) A Weiwers	3	4

Third round
3	(United Kingdom) J Bostock (United Kingdom) E Hilton	6	6
(United Kingdom) K Keith-Steele (Republic of Ireland) E Lombard	4	3
(United Kingdom) E Hamilton (United Kingdom) V Dace	6	3
(South Africa) D Muller (South Africa) S Summers	8	6

Quarterfinals
3	(United Kingdom) J Bostock (United Kingdom) E Hilton	6	9
(South Africa) D Muller (South Africa) S Summers	3	7

The nationality of Miss BM Crosoer is unknown.

=== Bottom half ===
==== Section 3 ====
First round
(United Kingdom) Elsa Haylock (United Kingdom) Madge Slaney	6	6
(Austria) Hilde Doleschell (Denmark) Milly Vagn-Nielsen	1	1
(United Kingdom) Molly Blair (United Kingdom) Kay Menzies	6	6
Q	(United Kingdom) Pam Bocquet (United Kingdom) Edna Pool	0	2
(United Kingdom) Nancy Fontes (United Kingdom) Denise Pritchard	1	1
(United Kingdom) Peggy Dawson-Scott (United Kingdom) Mary Halford	6	6
(United Kingdom) Penny Durlac (United Kingdom) Joan Strawson	4	1
(Romania) Magda Rurac (United Kingdom) Georgie Woodgate	6	6

Second round
(United Kingdom) E Haylock (United Kingdom) M Slaney	3	2
(United Kingdom) M Blair (United Kingdom) K Menzies	6	6
(United Kingdom) P Dawson-Scott (United Kingdom) M Halford
(Romania) M Rurac (United Kingdom) G Woodgate	w/o
(Belgium) Miriamme de Borman (Belgium) Josane de Meulemeester	6	6
(France) Colette Boegner (France) Monique Hamelin	4	1
(United Kingdom) Bea Carris (United Kingdom) Audrey Osborne	3	5
4	(Australia) Nancye Bolton (Australia) Nell Hopman	6	7

Third round
(United Kingdom) M Blair (United Kingdom) K Menzies	6	7
(United Kingdom) P Dawson-Scott (United Kingdom) M Halford	4	5
(Belgium) M de Borman (Belgium) J de Meulemeester	2	0
4	(Australia) N Bolton (Australia) E Hopman	6	6

Quarterfinals
(United Kingdom) M Blair (United Kingdom) K Menzies	6	6
4	(Australia) N Bolton (Australia) E Hopman	3	3

==== Section 4 ====
First round

Second round
(Hungary) Magda Baumgarten (Netherlands) Madzy Couquerque	w/o
(United Kingdom) Nancy Glover (United Kingdom) Peggy Vivian
Q	(United Kingdom) Joey David (United Kingdom) Phyllis Grover	2	4
(United Kingdom) Anita Ellis (Poland) Jadwiga Jędrzejowska	6	6
(Australia) Alison Baker (United Kingdom) Effie Peters	6	6
(Sweden) Birgit Gullbrandsson (United Kingdom) Alex McKelvie	3	1
(Hungary) Zsuzsa Körmöczy (Hungary) Márta Peterdy	1	2
1	(United States) Louise Brough (United States) Margaret Osborne	6	6

Third round
(United Kingdom) N Glover (United Kingdom) M Vivian	7	6	2
(United Kingdom) A Ellis (Poland) J Jędrzejowska	9	3	6
(Australia) A Baker (United Kingdom) E Peters	2	0
1	(United States) L Brough (United States) M Osborne	6	6

Quarterfinals
(United Kingdom) A Ellis (Poland) J Jędrzejowska	1	3
1	(United States) L Brough (United States) M Osborne	6	6
