= Norman Kitovitz =

British tennis player

- Country (sports): United Kingdom
- Born: 9 November 1920
- Died: 1991 (aged 70–71) Lambeth, London, England
- Plays: Right-handed

Grand Slam singles results
- Wimbledon: 2R (1949, 1954, 1957)

Grand Slam doubles results
- Wimbledon: 3R (1947)

Grand Slam mixed doubles results
- Wimbledon: 2R (1947, 1948)

Norman Kitovitz (9 November 1920 – 1991) was a British former tennis player.

Kitovitz, who had origins in Singapore, attended Oxford University and was awarded his blues in 1939. He made his first main draw appearance at the Wimbledon Championships in 1947 and reached the singles second round on three occasions. In 1963 he won the singles title at the Surrey Hard Court Championships held in Roehampton.

== Personal life ==
Kitovitz married Sheila Mary O'Leary in 1950. He is a grandfather of Paralympic gold medalist Paul Blake.
