= Pierre Pellizza =

French tennis player

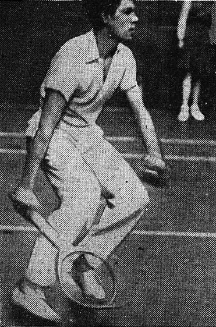
- Country (sports): France; United States
- Born: 10 July 1917 Lourdes, France
- Died: 8 June 1974 (aged 56) Louisville, Kentucky, United States
- Turned pro: 1948 (amateur tour from 1935)
- Retired: 1964

Grand Slam singles results
- French Open: QF (1946, 1947)
- Wimbledon: QF (1946)
- US Open: 4R (1936, 1946)

Other tournaments
- Professional majors
- US Pro: Last 16 (1948, 1949, 1950)

Grand Slam doubles results
- Wimbledon: QF (1946, 1947)

Grand Slam mixed doubles results
- Wimbledon: 4R (1946)

Pierre Pellizza (10 July 1917 – 8 June 1974) was a French tennis player in the years before and after World War 2. In 1948 he settled in America. His younger brother was tennis and badminton player Henri Pellizza. Allison Danzig of The New York Times said of Pierre Pellizza: "Pellizza was a bulldog for tenacity. He showed a forehand that rivalled Petra's...and a backhand that excelled his countryman's". The best results of Pierre Pellizza's career came at Monte Carlo, where he won the title in 1939 and 1946 (beating Yvon Petra in both finals). Pellizza played Davis Cup from 1938 to 1947.

At the French Championships, Pellizza reached the quarter-finals in 1946 (where he lost to Tom Brown) and 1947 (where he beat 8th seed Enrique Morea before losing to Tom Brown). At Wimbledon his best performance was in 1946, when he reached the quarterfinals (he came from two sets down to beat Dragutin Mitić before losing to Jaroslav Drobný). At the U.S. Championships, Pellizza's best results were the last 16 in 1936 (where he lost to Bitsy Grant) and 1946 (where he lost a five set match to former champion Don McNeill) He turned professional in 1948. Like Paul Féret and Henri Cochet, Pellizza was later reinstated as an amateur. He played the French Championships for the last time in 1957, when he lost in the first round to Andrés Gimeno.
