= András Ádám-Stolpa =

Hungarian tennis, basketball, and ice hockey player

András Ádám-Stolpa Stolpa András (Hungarian)
- Country (sports): Hungary
- Born: 15 September 1921
- Died: 8 November 2010 (aged 89); Düsseldorf

Singles

Grand Slam singles results
- French Open: QF (1947)
- Wimbledon: 2R (1947, 1949)

Doubles

Grand Slam doubles results
- Wimbledon: 2R (1947)

Mixed doubles

Grand Slam mixed doubles results
- Wimbledon: 2R (1947)

András Ádám-Stolpa (15 September 1921 – 8 November 2010) was a Hungarian champion tennis, basketball and ice hockey player.

Ádám-Stolpa was on the Hungarian Davis Cup team in 1948 (the same year he won the Hungarian National Tennis Championships), 1949, 1952, 1954, 1955, and 1957–1960.

Ádám-Stolpa advanced to the quarterfinals of the 1947 French Championships after defeating the second seeded American, Budge Patty. (In 1950, Mr. Patty won the men's singles championship at both Wimbledon and the French Open.) Mr. Stolpa played men's singles in the French Open again in 1948, 1954–1960, and 1965.

Adam-Stolpa played in seniors tournaments in Budapest 13–16 November 2008. and 5–8 February 2009. On 27 July 2009, he was ranked 876th senior male by the International Tennis Federation.
