= Bob Falkenburg =

American tennis player (1926–2022)

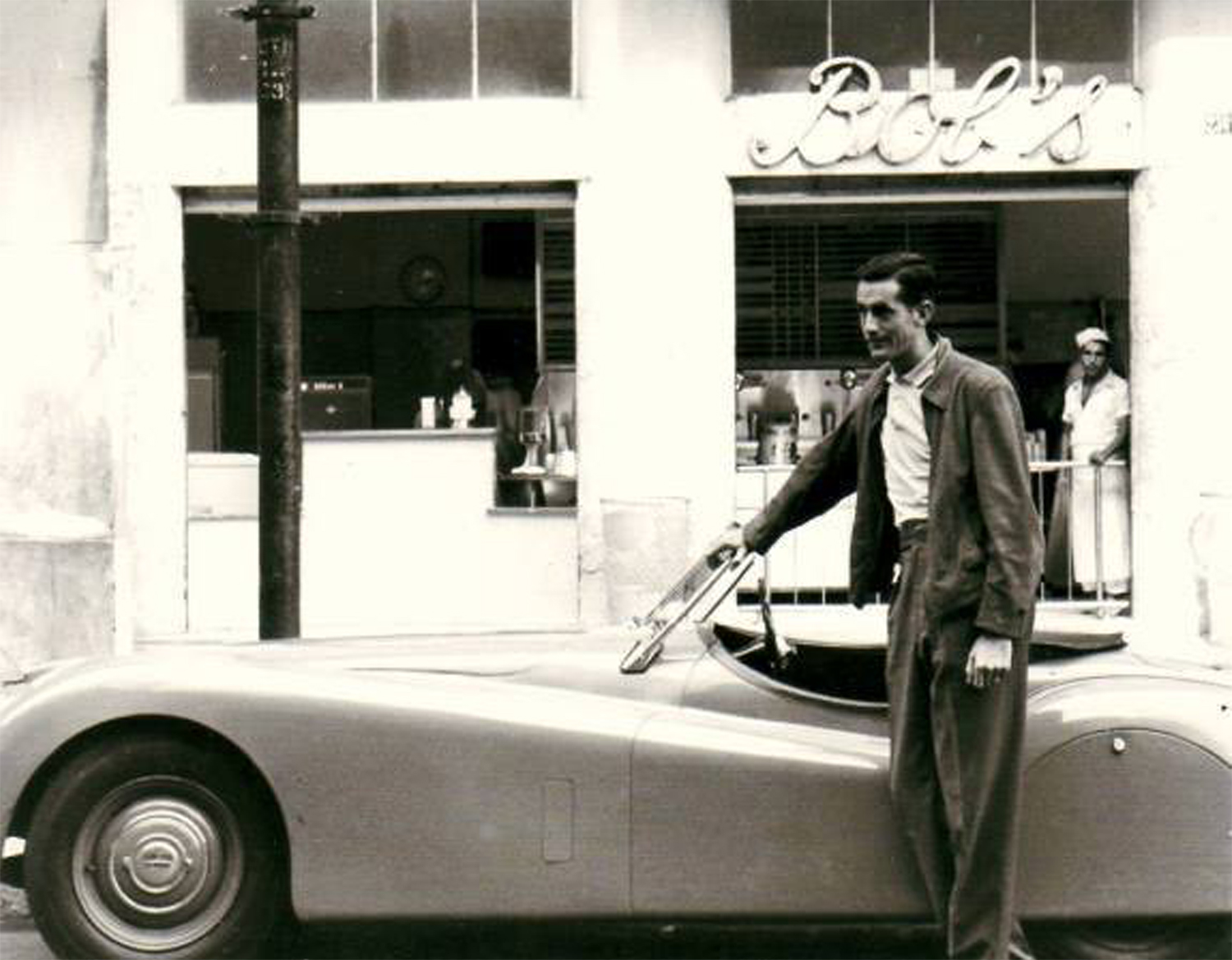
- Bob Falkenburg in front of the first Bob's ice-cream shop in Rio de Janeiro in 1952
- Full name: Robert Falkenburg
- Country (sports): United States (until 1948); Brazil (1949–1955)
- Born: January 29, 1926 Manhattan, New York, U.S.
- Died: January 6, 2022 (aged 95) Santa Ynez, California, U.S.
- Height: 6 ft 3 in (1.91 m)
- Turned pro: 1942 (amateur tour)
- Retired: 1955
- Plays: Right-handed (one-handed backhand)
- Int. Tennis HoF: 1974 (member page)

Singles
- Highest ranking: No. 7 (1948, John Olliff)

Grand Slam singles results
- French Open: 4R (1954)
- Wimbledon: W (1948)
- US Open: SF (1946)

Doubles

Grand Slam doubles results
- Wimbledon: W (1947)
- US Open: W (1944)

Mixed doubles

Grand Slam mixed doubles results
- Wimbledon: 4R (1947)
- US Open: F (1945)

Team competitions
- Davis Cup: SF^{Am} (1955)

Robert Falkenburg (January 29, 1926 – January 6, 2022) was a Brazilian-American tennis player and entrepreneur. He is best known for winning the Men's Singles at the 1948 Wimbledon Championships and introducing soft ice cream and American fast food to Brazil in 1952. He founded the Brazilian fast food chain Bob's.

== Early life ==
Falkenburg was born in New York City on January 29, 1926, and grew up in Los Angeles, California, in a tennis-playing family. His parents, Eugene "Genie" Lincoln Falkenburg (an engineer involved in the construction of Hoover Dam) and Marguerite "Mickey" Crooks Falkenburg were amateur tennis players. While employed by Westinghouse, Eugene was transferred to South America, where he moved with his wife and three children to São Paulo, Brazil. There Mickey won the state tennis championship in 1927. Mickey was always involved in tennis. In The Game: My 40 Years in Tennis, tennis champion Jack Kramer wrote that Mickey Falkenburg was "the first person to ever suggest to him the idea of a team-tennis league," a league which he later created. Bob's sister, Jinx Falkenburg, an American film star/model and radio and television talk show host, was also an amateur tennis player and his brother Tom had a successful tennis career as well.

He started to play tennis in 1936 when he was 10 years old. Like other players from Southern California, he frequently played at the Los Angeles Tennis Club, located very close to his family's home. Bob also played at the Bel-Air Country Club where he won the junior tennis tournament in 1937. As a youngster, he participated in different tournaments around the city.

== Tennis career ==
In 1942 and 1943 while attending Fairfax High School, Falkenburg won the National Interscholastic singles title and won the national doubles title with his brother, Tom. In 1943, Falkenburg became the Los Angeles city singles title holder. The following year he claimed the United States doubles crown with Don McNeill at Forest Hills, New York. In 1943 Bob became one of the youngest players to enter the US Top 10 amateur ranks. He remained in the U.S. top 10 for five years and was ranked as World No. 7 by sports journalist John Olliff of The Daily Telegraph. He won the men's singles in the Ojai Tennis Tournament in 1950.

From 1944 to 1945, during World War II, Falkenburg served in the military as an air cadet. Being enlisted in the service, however, did not put a complete halt to his tennis career and he continued to play occasionally while in the Air Force. In 1946, while attending the University of Southern California, he won the NCAA singles and doubles titles. He teamed again with his brother Tom to win the NCAA doubles final.

At the age of 20, Falkenburg was considered to have "the fastest serve in tennis." After marrying a Brazilian, Lourdes Mayrink Veiga Machado, in 1947 he moved to Rio de Janeiro in 1950, where he played the 1954 and 1955 Brazilian Davis Cup teams.

== Wimbledon titles ==
In 1947, he paired with Jack Kramer and they won the Wimbledon doubles title. A year later, on July 2, 1948, Falkenburg reached the pinnacle of his tennis career by winning the Wimbledon singles championship. He won the acclaimed tennis crown against Australian John Bromwich. Bromwich had a match point at 5–3 in the fifth set, but Falkenburg saved three match points and went on to win 7–5 in the fifth set.

It took 71 years before Falkenburg's feat was repeated. At Wimbledon in 2019, Novak Djokovic fought off Roger Federer by saving two championship points in the fifth and final set to win the men's title for the fifth time. Falkenburg won Wimbledon because he was not only a great tennis player, but a superb strategist. Fellow tennis player Tom Brown, who was a runner up in the 1947 Wimbledon Championships described Falkenburg's competitive approach, "He would review the situation, figure out what was likely, and take chances."

== Hall of Fame inductions ==
Falkenburg has been inducted into numerous Halls of Fame, including the International Tennis Hall of Fame in 1974, the Intercollegiate Tennis Hall of Fame in 1985, the Fairfax High School Hall of Fame in 1999, the U.S.C. Hall of Fame in 2009, and the Southern California Tennis Association Hall of Fame in 2010.

== Bob's restaurants ==
Falkenburg was offered a $100,000-a-year professional tennis contract. He turned it down and instead opened an ice cream and fast food business in Brazil. Soon after opening the first ice cream shop near the Copacabana beach front in 1952, his business became a success. Falkenburg's soft ice cream was the first introduced to Brazil.

A year later, the ice cream shop became a fast food restaurant. The restaurant, named Bob's, was the first fast food restaurant in South America. Bob's menu includes traditional American food such as hamburgers, hot dogs, milkshakes and sundaes. Because it offered new tastes and a modern look, Bob's became a hit with the Brazilian glitterati, making Bob's the most prosperous food business in Brazil. As of 2011, Bob's, no longer owned by Falkenburg, had over 600 locations in Brazil as well as three other countries.

== Golf career ==
Falkenburg also had a successful amateur golf career. He played in many international golf championships and won the Brazilian amateur championship three times. He took part in golf tournaments including the Bob Hope Desert Classic, where his team won in 1967; the Bing Crosby Pro-Am in Pebble Beach, California, where he played several times; the Eisenhower Cup, where he played for Brazil in Rome in 1964, Mexico City in 1966 and Melbourne in 1968; and in the United Kingdom at the British Amateur Golf Championship, where he led the American contingent on the first qualifying round after having a hole-in-one at Carnoustie. He also participated as an amateur in various European golf championships in France, Spain, Germany, Switzerland, Belgium and several Scandinavian countries.

== Personal life ==
In 1970, the Falkenburgs moved back to Southern California. In 1974, at the age of 48, he sold the Bob's chain (consisting of 12 stores) to Libby of Brazil (later acquired by Nestlé). Retired in Los Angeles, Falkenburg spent much time playing golf at the Bel-Air Country Club, where he often played with former Los Angeles Lakers star and friend Jerry West and others. He became the president of the club. Falkenburg and his wife resided in Santa Ynez, California. He died in Santa Ynez on January 6, 2022, at the age of 95.

== Grand Slam finals ==
=== Singles (1 title) ===
Result	Year	Championship	Surface	Opponent	Score
Win	1948	Wimbledon	Grass	(Australia) John Bromwich	7–5, 0–6, 6–2, 3–6, 7–5

=== Doubles (2 titles, 1 runner-up) ===
Result	Year	Championship	Surface	Partner	Opponents	Score
Win	1944	U.S. Championships	Grass	(United States) Don McNeill	(United States) Pancho Segura (United States) Bill Talbert	7–5, 6–4, 3–6, 6–1
Loss	1945	U.S. Championships	Grass	(United States) Jack Tuero	(United States) Gardnar Mulloy (United States) Bill Talbert	10–12, 10–8, 10–12, 2–6
Win	1947	Wimbledon	Grass	(United States) Jack Kramer	(United Kingdom) Tony Mottram (Australia) Bill Sidwell	8–6, 6–3, 6–3

=== Mixed doubles (1 runner-up) ===
Result	Year	Championship	Surface	Partner	Opponents	Score
Loss	1945	U.S. Championships	Grass	(United States) Doris Hart	(United States) Margaret Osborne duPont (United States) Bill Talbert	4–6, 4–6

== Performance timeline ==
Key
W	F	SF	QF	#R	RR	Q#	DNQ	A	NH

(W) winner; (F) finalist; (SF) semifinalist; (QF) quarterfinalist; (#R) rounds 4, 3, 2, 1; (RR) round-robin stage; (Q#) qualification round; (DNQ) did not qualify; (A) absent; (NH) not held; (SR) strike rate (events won / competed); (W–L) win–loss record.

Tournament	1942	1943	1944	1945	1946	1947	1948	1949	1950–1953	1954	1955
Grand Slam tournaments
Australian	A	A	A	A	A	A	A	A	A	A	A
French	A	A	A	A	A	A	A	A	A	4R	A
Wimbledon	A	A	A	A	A	QF	W	QF	A	3R	A
U.S.	2R	2R	QF	QF	SF	QF	QF	A	A	A	2R
