= Jan Staubo =

Norwegian sportsman, politician and sports official

Jan Staubo (28 September 1920 – 15 June 2003) was a Norwegian sportsman, politician and sports official. As a sportsman he competed internationally in tennis and nationally in other sports. He was a member of the city council of Norway's capital, and a member of the International Olympic Committee for 34 years.

== Personal life ==
He was born in Kristiania as a son of ship-owner Helmer Staubo and Wanda Næss, and younger brother of ship-owner Knut Helmer Staubo. In Sep 1937 to Dec 1937 he attended Felsted school in Essex, England. In 1962 he married Sally Calvert, an american citizen. They have two daughters, Kari and Lina.

== Career ==
Staubo took secondary education at Oslo Commerce School in 1940. During the Second World War he fought in the Norwegian Campaign and was later an air pilot in exile, and was imprisoned by the Germans for about three years in total. He tried to escape several times, one time being shot and having to amputate a lung. He first tried to escape from Norway to neutral Sweden in 1941, but was arrested in Verdal and imprisoned in Vollan prison in Trondheim. After escaping from there he fled to Shetland on the fishcutter Sigurd in 1941, together with Joachim Rønneberg and others. He went via London to Little Norway, where he was trained as a pilot and joined the No. 332 Squadron RAF. He was shot down on 19 August 1942 in a Spitfire by a Focke-Wulf Fw 190 near Dieppe, and was captured by Germans again. He was imprisoned in Stalag Luft III, and helped with preparing the "Great Escape", but was moved to another camp before the escape actually took place.

As a tennis player he won the Norwegian singles championships in 1948 and 1950. He represented IF Ready, and won the national team championship with them in 1953. He won two indoor championships. He competed in the 1946 US Open and the 1947, 1949 and 1950 Wimbledon Championships. He also invited former Stalag inmate Eric Sturgess from South Africa to play in Norway on several occasions. Staubo was also a national team player in bandy, and he played ice hockey. He was also chairman of IF Ready for some time.

He served as chairman of the Norwegian Tennis Federation for some time, and was a board member of the Norwegian Confederation of Sports. Internationally he was a member of the International Olympic Committee from 1966 to 2000. He took over for Olaf Ditlev-Simonsen, in a tradition since 1905 that Norway had one IOC member at any time. However, in 1992 Olaf Paulsen took a second seat (which he left in 1995), and in 1994 Gerhard Heiberg took a third seat. Staubo became an honorary member of the IOC after retiring at the age of 80. A board member of the Lillehammer Olympic Organising Committee, he is said to have contributed to the 1994 Winter Olympics being held in Norway, and also to the establishing of the Norwegian Olympic Museum.

He was a member of Oslo city council from 1961 to 1967 for the Conservative Party. He held the rank of lieutenant colonel. In his professional career Staubo was a ship-owner. He was a deputy chairman of the Oslo Port Authority, deputy board member of the Norwegian Shipowners' Association and a member of the marine committee of the International Chamber of Shipping. He established the electronics company Statronic in Kilsund in the 1960s; the company later changed its name to Kitron, merged with Sonec and moved to Sonec's locality at Hisøy Municipality.

Staubo lived at a farm in Staubø in his later life. He died in June 2003.
