= József Asbóth =

Hungarian tennis player (1917–1986)

- Country (sports): Hungary
- Born: 18 September 1917; Szombathely, Kingdom of Hungary, Austria-Hungary
- Died: 22 September 1986 (aged 69); München, West Germany
- Turned pro: 1939 (amateur tour)
- Retired: 1957
- Plays: Right-handed (one-handed backhand)

Singles
- Career record: 219–71
- Career titles: 48
- Highest ranking: No. 8 (1948, John Olliff)

Grand Slam singles results
- French Open: W (1947)
- Wimbledon: SF (1948)

Mixed doubles

Grand Slam mixed doubles results
- French Open: SF (1947)

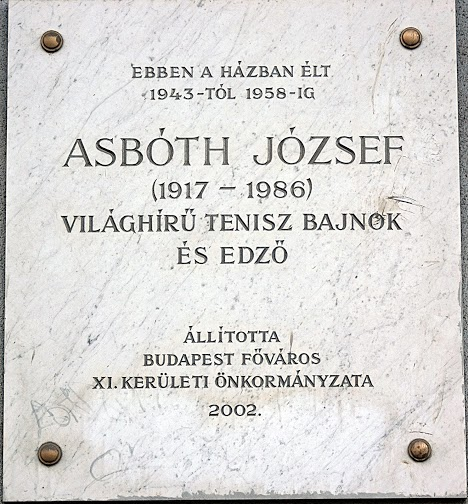
Commemorative plaque in Budapest District XI, Bartók Béla Street No 75.

József Asbóth (Hungarian: [ˈjoːʒɛf ˈɒʒboːt]; 18 September 1917 – 22 September 1986) was a Hungarian tennis player. Born to a family of railway workers, he is best remembered for being the first Hungarian and first player from Eastern Europe to win a Grand Slam singles title, at the 1947 French Open (where as the fifth seed he beat Yvon Petra, Tom Brown and Eric Sturgess). He remains the only Hungarian male player to win a Grand Slam singles title. Asbóth was a clay court specialist who was good at keeping the ball in play.

Asbóth also reached the semifinals at Wimbledon in 1948 (beating Sturgess and Brown, then losing to John Bromwich). Hungary's Communist government had let him leave the country only after the personal warrant of the Swedish King Gustaf V that Asbóth would return to his homeland and wasn't going to emigrate. In 1941, he was a member of the Hungarian team that won the Central European Cup.

Asboth won the Open de Nice Côte d'Azur or Nice French Riviera Open tournament in 1947 defeating Bob Falkenburg and again in 1948 defeating Budge Patty and Jaroslav Drobný in the semifinal and final. He won the Monte-Carlo Masters tournament in 1948 defeating Patty in the semifinal in five sets.

Asbóth was ranked World No. 8 by John Olliff of The Daily Telegraph in 1948 (and No. 9 in 1947).

His Davis Cup record was 24 wins and 17 losses. He won the Hungarian National Tennis Championships 13 times.

After his career, he became responsible for the next generation of tennis players at the Belgian Tennis Federation. He later became a trainer in Munich.

In 1993 a street was named after Asbóth in Szombathely, the city where he was born.

== Grand Slam finals ==
=== Singles (1 title) ===
Result	Year	Championship	Surface	Opponent	Score
Win	1947	French Championships	Clay	(South Africa) Eric Sturgess	8–6, 7–5, 6–4
