= Jimmy Jones (tennis) =

British tennis player and author

Clarence Medlycott Jones
- Country (sports): United Kingdom
- Born: 10 July 1912 Norwood, London, England
- Died: 22 March 1986 (aged 74) London, England
- Turned pro: 1931 (amateur)
- Retired: 1950

Singles
- Career record: 105/102 (50.7%)
- Career titles: 22

Grand Slam singles results
- Wimbledon: 4R (1936)
- US Open: 2R (1937)

Clarence Medlycott "Jimmy" Jones (10 July 1912 – 22 March 1986) was a British tennis player and author (writing under the name C. M. Jones). In major tournaments his best result came at the 1936 Wimbledon Championships where he reached the fourth round. Jones was a successful player winning events on multiple surfaces including clay, cement, grass and wood (indoors). Between 1931 and 1950 he contested 36 career finals and won 22 titles.

== Career ==
Jones was born in Norwood, London. In 1931 played his first event at the Blackheath tournament where he reached the final and won his first title. In 1933 he was a quarter finalist at the South of France Championships and semi finalist at the French Switzerland Championships and the Nice LTC Cup. In 1935 he won the London Championships but had to share the title with Wilmer Allison. At the 1936 Wimbledon Championships – Men's Singles he reached the fourth round, where he lost against Wilmer Allison.

In 1937 he competed at the U.S. National Championships where he was seeded No17, but he lost to the American player Gilbert Hunt. Whilst in the United States that year he competed at the Pacific Coast Championships where he lost to Don Budge in round four. In 1938 he was a semi finalist at the British Covered Court Championships. In 1939 he competed at the Caribbean Championships and Jamaican International Championships where he was losing semi finalist.

In 1949 he won his final title at the West Sussex Championships at Bognor Regis against George Bayley. In 1950 he played his final tournament at the Wimbledon Championships where he lost in the first round to French player Jean-Claude Molinari.

His career singles highlights include winning the Essex Championships at Westcliff-on-Sea three times (1933, 1935, 1937), West Sussex Championships two times (1933, 1949), the Reigate Grass Courts two times (1935, 1939), the Sutton Hard Courts on clay two times (1926, 1938), the Lowther LTC tournament London two times (1948–48).

He also won single titles at the following events Blackheath (1936), Alassio International at Alassio, Italy (1933), the Derbyshire Championships at Buxton (1935), Carlisle Clay Courts (1935), West Twickenham (1935), the Middlesex Championships at Chiswick (1937), the Surrey Covered Court Championships at Dulwich (1938), the Cromer Covered Courts Championships at Cromer (1938), Hull Open (1938), Montrose Grass Courts at Montrose (1948), and the London Hard Court Championships at Hurlingham (1949).

In addition he was a finalist at the following tournaments Henley Hard Courts (1931), Harrogate (1934), Tally-Ho! Hard Courts (1935, 1938), Bexhill-on-Sea (1935), South of England Championships at Eastbourne (1935, 1938), Queens Club Hard Courts (1936), Herga Club tournament (1936), the Northumberland Championships (1937) the East Gloucestershire Championships (1937), the Northern Championships (1938), Paddington (1938), Sidmouth (1938), the North of England Championships at Scarborough (1938)

After his sports career he wrote many works on tennis. He died in London, aged 73.

== Works ==
- Clarence Medlycott Jones: Winning Bowls. S.Paul, 1965
- Clarence Medlycott Jones: The Watney Book of Bowls. Queen Anne Publishing, 1967
- Clarence Medlycott Jones: Tennis: How to Become a Champion. Faber & Faber, 1968, ISBN 978-0571084357
- Clarence Medlycott Jones: Your Book of Tennis. Faber & Faber, 1970, ISBN 978-0571087679
- Clarence Medlycott Jones: Match-Winning Tennis: Tactics, Temperament and Training. Faber & Faber, 1971, ISBN 978-0571092895
- Owen Davidson, Clarence Medlycott Jones: Great Women Tennis Players. Pelham Bks, 1971, ISBN 978-0720704600
- Clarence Medlycott Jones: Improving Your Tennis: Strokes and Techniques. Faber & Faber, 1973, ISBN 978-0571101481
- Angela Buxton, Clarence Medlycott Jones: Play Better Tennis. Collins, 1974, ISBN 978-0001033115
- Clarence Medlycott Jones: Tennis Guide. Littlehampton Book Services Ltd, 1975, ISBN 978-0600387145
- Clarence Medlycott Jones: Starting Tennis. Littlehampton Book Services Ltd, 1975, ISBN 978-0706319729
- Judy Hashman, Clarence Medlycott Jones: Starting Badminton. Littlehampton Book Services Ltd, 1977, ISBN 978-0706351262
- Clarence Medlycott Jones: How to Play Tennis. Book Sales, 1979, ISBN 978-0890091920
- Angela Buxton, Clarence Medlycott Jones: Winning Tennis: Doubles Tactics. Littlehampton Book Services Ltd, 1980, ISBN 978-0706350890
- Clarence Medlycott Jones: Tennis (Play the Game). Hamlyn, 1984, ISBN 978-0600500179
