= Bill Sidwell =

Australian tennis player (1920–2021)

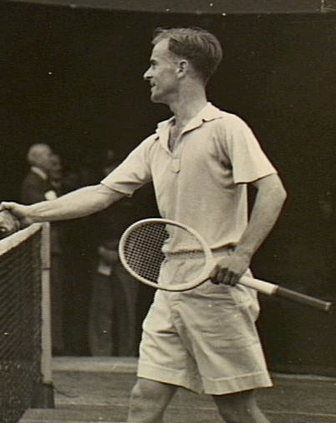
- Sidwell (1945)
- Full name: Oswald William Thomas Sidwell
- Country (sports): Australia
- Residence: Sydney, Australia
- Born: 16 April 1920 Goulburn, New South Wales, Australia
- Died: 19 August 2021 (aged 101) Caringbah, New South Wales, Australia
- Height: 1.75 m (5 ft 9 in)
- Retired: 1951
- Plays: Right-handed

Singles
- Highest ranking: No. 10 (1949, John Olliff)

Grand Slam singles results
- Australian Open: SF (1948, 1949, 1950)
- Wimbledon: 4R (1950)
- US Open: 3R (1947, 1948)

Doubles

Grand Slam doubles results
- Australian Open: F (1949)
- French Open: F (1947)
- Wimbledon: F (1947, 1950)
- US Open: W (1949)

Grand Slam mixed doubles results
- Australian Open: F (1948)

Team competitions
- Davis Cup: F (1948^{Ch}, 1949^{Ch})

Oswald William Thomas Sidwell (16 April 1920 – 19 August 2021) was an Australian tennis player.

Sidwell reached five Grand Slam doubles finals, winning once, at the 1949 U.S. National Championships with compatriot John Bromwich. He also played in the Davis Cup in 1948 and 1949 where Australia lost to the United States both years in the Challenge Round. As a junior, he won the Australian Open boys' singles event in 1939. Sidwell played golf regularly in place of tennis.

He was ranked world No. 10 for 1949 by John Olliff. As of December 2008, Sidwell was still organising golf events at the age of 88. He turned 100 in April 2020 and died in Caringbah in August 2021, at the age of 101.

== Grand Slam finals ==
=== Doubles (1 title, 4 runners-up) ===
Result	Year	Championship	Surface	Partner	Opponents	Score
Loss	1947	French Championships	Clay	(United States) Tom Brown	(South Africa) Eustace Fannin (South Africa) Eric Sturgess	4–6, 6–4, 4–6, 3–6
Loss	1947	Wimbledon	Grass	(United Kingdom) Tony Mottram	(United States) Bob Falkenburg (United States) Jack Kramer	6–8, 3–6, 3–6
Loss	1949	Australian Championships	Grass	(Australia) Geoff Brown	(Australia) John Bromwich (Australia) Adrian Quist	6–1, 5–7, 2–6, 3–6
Win	1949	US National Championships	Grass	(Australia) John Bromwich	(Australia) Frank Sedgman (Australia) George Worthington	6–4, 6–0, 6–1
Loss	1950	Wimbledon	Grass	(Australia) Geoff Brown	(Australia) John Bromwich (Australia) Adrian Quist	5–7, 6–3, 3–6, 6–3, 2–6

=== Mixed doubles (1 runner-up) ===
Result	Year	Championship	Surface	Partner	Opponents	Score
Loss	1948	Australian Championships	Grass	(Australia) Thelma Coyne Long	(Australia) Nancye Wynne Bolton (Australia) Colin Long	5–7, 6–4, 6–8
