= Eustace Fannin =

South African tennis player

- Country (sports): South Africa
- Born: 28 June 1915; Ixopo, Natal, Union of South Africa
- Died: 25 November 1997 (aged 82); Durban, KwaZulu-Natal, South Africa
- Plays: Right-handed

Singles

Grand Slam singles results
- French Open: 3R (1947)
- Wimbledon: 3R (1937, 1949)
- US Open: 1R (1949)

Doubles

Grand Slam doubles results
- French Open: W (1947)
- Wimbledon: QF (1947)

Grand Slam mixed doubles results
- Wimbledon: 4R (1947)

Evelyn Eustace Fannin (28 June 1915 – 25 November 1997) was a South African tennis player.

Fannin was born in Ixopo in June 1915 and educated at Hilton College. In 1947, he won the doubles title at the French Championships with compatriot Eric Sturgess defeating American Tom Brown and Australian Bill Sidwell in four sets. Two years later, in 1949, they again reached the doubles final but this time lost to the American team of Pancho Gonzales and Frank Parker in four sets.

In 1947, he lost the final of the Netherlands Championships to Frenchman Henri Cochet.

Between 1937 and 1949, Fannin played seven times for the South African Davis Cup team and compiled a record of nine wins and seven losses. He died in Durban in November 1997 at the age of 82.

== Grand Slam finals ==
=== Doubles (1 title, 1 runner-up) ===
Result	Year	Championship	Surface	Partner	Opponents	Score
Win	1947	French Championships	Clay	(South Africa) Eric Sturgess	(United States) Tom Brown (Australia) Bill Sidwell	6–4, 4–6, 6–4, 6–3
Loss	1949	French Championships	Clay	(South Africa) Eric Sturgess	(United States) Pancho Gonzales (United States) Frank Parker	3–6, 6–8, 7–5, 3–6
