= Tom Brown (tennis) =

American tennis player (1922–2011)

- Country (sports): United States
- Born: September 26, 1922; Washington D.C., U.S.
- Died: October 27, 2011 (aged 89); Castro Valley, California, U.S.
- Turned pro: 1939 (amateur tour)
- Retired: 1969
- Plays: Right-handed (one-handed backhand)

Singles
- Career record: 314–96
- Career titles: 34
- Highest ranking: No. 7 (1946, Pierre Gillou)

Grand Slam singles results
- Australian Open: SF (1947)
- French Open: SF (1946, 1947)
- Wimbledon: F (1947)
- US Open: F (1946)

Doubles

Grand Slam doubles results
- Australian Open: SF (1947)
- French Open: F (1947)
- Wimbledon: W (1946)

Grand Slam mixed doubles results
- French Open: F (1946)
- Wimbledon: W (1946)
- US Open: W (1948)

Thomas P. Brown Jr. (September 26, 1922 – October 27, 2011) was one of the top amateur tennis players in the world in the 1940s and a consistent winner in veterans' and seniors' competitions. He was the son of Thomas P. Brown, a newspaper correspondent, later public relations director for a railroad, and Hilda Jane Fisher, who became a schoolteacher when Tom was a boy. Though born in Washington, D.C., Tom was considered a San Franciscan all his life, having been brought west by his parents (both Californians) at the age of two.

== Biography ==
Tom Brown Jr. got his start playing tennis at San Francisco's Golden Gate Park where on weekends his parents played, and Tom tagged along. He quickly became intrigued with the sport, was soon beating his parents and winning citywide children's championships. He was captain of the tennis teams at both Lowell High School and the University of California-Berkeley.

For one for whom tennis was never the main event in life, he had a successful record in the sport, before devoting himself to a law practice and raising a family. At his best he had wins over top players of his era. As Private First Class Brown won the singles title of the prestigious Pacific Coast Championships in October 1945, the second oldest tennis tournament in the U.S. Brown won it four times, twice in singles, twice in doubles. Then, fresh out of the Army after World War II, he reached the 1946 Wimbledon semifinals, in which he led that year's eventual champion, France's Yvon Petra, by two sets before losing.

In demand as a doubles partner among the world's best, both men and women, Brown, with Jack Kramer, won the 1946 Wimbledon doubles against Australia's Geoff Brown and Dinny Pails. He also won its mixed doubles, teamed with Louise Brough, against Dorothy (Dodo) Bundy and Geoff Brown. The same year, at the French, he played the mixed finals with "Dodo" and reached the semis of the singles (losing to Jaroslav Drobny). At the U.S. Nationals, he reached the singles finals by defeating Fred Kovaleski, Tom Falkenburg, Bitsy Grant, Herbie Flam, Frank Parker and Gardnar Mulloy, then he was defeated by Kramer.

At the Australian championships in 1947, Brown beat Adrian Quist, then lost to Dinny Pails in the semifinals. In the Wimbledon singles in 1947, Brown beat defending champion Petra and future champion Budge Patty, then lost easily to Kramer in the final. At the French (held after Wimbledon for the last time), he lost in the semifinals to eventual winner Jozsef Asboth, and he was in the doubles finals with Billy Sidwell of Australia.

In 1948 at Wimbledon, he teamed with Gardnar Mulloy, losing the doubles final to the Australian duo John Bromwich and Frank Sedgman. Brown also took the U.S. mixed doubles title with his favorite partner, Louise Brough.

It was 16 years before he gave Wimbledon another shot. In both 1964 and 1965. he was put out in the second round of the singles; in 1965 by John Newcombe who, several years later, became a three-time Wimbledon champion. He played doubles those years with (respectively) Hugh Stewart and Gene Scott. Both were first-round losses.

Kramer wrote in his 1979 autobiography The Game, My 40 Years in Tennis that Brown "was known as 'The Frisco Flailer' (we had nicknames like that in those days), and he was strong off the ground with an excellent running forehand, but he was always my pigeon." Kramer was the only player who "owned" Brown, beating him nine straight matches without the loss of a set.

Brown was also on three U.S. Davis Cup teams, and in 1950, against Australia, playing his second challenge round singles, he won the U.S.'s only point in five hard-fought sets, defeating Ken McGregor, who became the 1951 Wimbledon singles finalist and the 1952 Australian singles champion.

Brown had a lifelong passion for travel, a wanderlust he said he acquired as a two-year-old when he and his mother took a train ride out west from Washington, D.C. to Merced, California to join his father. The family then settled in San Francisco. During his law-practice years, whenever he got the chance to travel to a tennis tournament he took it, and well into his 30s, he was beating the world's top amateur competition. During and well beyond his active playing career, Brown was ranked in the U.S. top 10 eight times between 1946 and 1958, reaching as high as No. 3 in 1946. He was ranked World No. 7 for 1946 by Pierre Gillou and for 1947 by both John Olliff and Harry Hopman.

At ages 47 and 48, Brown won the National Men's 45-and-over hard court singles. He also took the U.S. National doubles 45-and-over three times, once with Art Larsen and twice with Tony Trabert. Upon retirement from his law practice, he fully embraced senior tennis, and at the age of 65 in 1987, won the USTA National Grand Slam in the 65-and-over singles, triumphing on hard, clay, grass and indoor surfaces, an almost unique accomplishment in the annals of U.S. veterans’ tennis. In 1988, the International Tennis Federation named him Outstanding Veterans Player in the world.

Brown won numerous national titles as a senior player: 24 singles and 11 doubles, pairing with Bobby Riggs three times and Fred Kovaleski eight times. Brown's last national title was in 1998. In 2007 he published his memoirs titled "As Tom Goes By".

Tom Brown died in Castro Valley, California on October 27, 2011, aged 89.

== Grand Slam finals ==
=== Singles (2 runners-up) ===
Result	Year	Championship	Surface	Opponent	Score
Loss	1946	US National Championships	Grass	(United States) Jack Kramer	7–9, 3–6, 0–6
Loss	1947	Wimbledon	Grass	(United States) Jack Kramer	1–6, 3–6, 2–6

=== Doubles (1 title, 2 runners-up) ===
Result	Year	Championship	Surface	Partner	Opponents	Score
Win	1946	Wimbledon	Grass	(United States) Jack Kramer	(Australia) Geoff Brown (Australia) Dinny Pails	6–4, 6–4, 6–2
Loss	1947	French Championships	Clay	(Australia) Billy Sidwell	(South Africa) Eustace Fannin (South Africa) Eric Sturgess	4–6, 6–4, 4–6, 3–6
Loss	1948	Wimbledon	Grass	(United States) Gardnar Mulloy	(Australia) John Bromwich (Australia) Frank Sedgman	7–5, 5–7, 5–7, 7–9

=== Mixed doubles (2 titles, 1 runner-up) ===
Result	Year	Championship	Surface	Partner	Opponents	Score
Win	1946	Wimbledon	Grass	(United States) Louise Brough	(United States) Dorothy Bundy (Australia) Geoff Brown	6–4, 6–4
Loss	1946	French Championships	Clay	(United States) Dorothy Bundy	(United States) Pauline Betz (United States) Budge Patty	5–7, 7–9
Win	1948	US National Championships	Grass	(United States) Louise Brough	(United States) Margaret Osborne duPont (United States) Bill Talbert	6–4, 6–4
