= Pierre Geelhand de Merxem =

Belgian tennis player

- Country (sports): Belgium
- Born: 10 May 1910
- Died: 1982

Singles

Grand Slam singles results
- French Open: 3R (1948)
- Wimbledon: 3R (1946)

Pierre Geelhand de Merxem (1910 – 1982) was a Belgian tennis player of the 1930s and 1940s.

Geelhand was Belgium's national singles champion in 1938 and won a further 12 national titles in doubles. In 1946 he won through to the third round at Wimbledon, losing in four sets to Budge Patty. He was beaten in the third round of the 1948 French Championships by 15th-seed Marcello del Bello in five sets. Between 1936 and 1948 he featured in 14 Davis Cup ties for Belgium. He was non-playing captain of the Belgian sides which were Inter-Zonal finalists in 1953 and 1957. During the 1970s he served as Chairman of the Royal Belgian Tennis Federation.

== See also ==
- List of Belgium Davis Cup team representatives
