= Tony Mottram =

British tennis player

- Full name: Anthony John Mottram
- Country (sports): United Kingdom
- Born: 8 June 1920; Coventry, England
- Died: 6 October 2016 (aged 96)

Singles

Grand Slam singles results
- French Open: 4R (1947, 1948)
- Wimbledon: QF (1948)
- US Open: 3R (1951)

Doubles

Grand Slam doubles results
- Wimbledon: F (1947)

Mixed doubles

Grand Slam mixed doubles results
- Wimbledon: QF (1946, 1948, 1949)

Anthony John Mottram (8 June 1920 – 6 October 2016) was a British tennis player of the 1940s and 1950s. Mottram reached the quarterfinal of the 1948 Wimbledon Championships in which he lost to Gardnar Mulloy. In the doubles event he reached the final of the 1947 Wimbledon Championships with Bill Sidwell in which they were defeated by the first-seeded team of Jack Kramer and Bob Falkenburg. He reached the French Open's fourth round in both 1947 and 1948, and the third round of the 1951 US Open.

Mottram was born in Coventry, then Warwickshire (now West Midlands), England. He appeared as a castaway on the BBC Radio programme Desert Island Discs on 14 June 1955. The All England Lawn Tennis Club elected him an Honorary Member in 1957. Mottram died on 6 October 2016 at the age of 96.

== Personal life ==
In 1949 he married Joy Gannon who was also a tennis player, as were their children Buster Mottram and Linda Mottram. In 1957 he published a book with his wife titled Modern Lawn Tennis.

== Grand Slam finals ==
=== Doubles (1 runner-up) ===
| Result | Year | Championship | Surface | Partner | Opponents | Score |
|---|---|---|---|---|---|---|
| Loss | 1947 | Wimbledon | Grass | (Australia) Bill Sidwell | (United States) Bob Falkenburg (United States) Jack Kramer | 6–8, 3–6, 3–6 |

== Bibliography ==
- — (1971). Play Better Tennis. S.Paul [sic]. ISBN 978-0091072018.
- — (1975). Tackle Tennis. Hutchinson. ISBN 978-0091247607.
- — (1980). Skills and Tactics of Tennis. Arco. ISBN 978-0668048422.
