= 1937 International Lawn Tennis Challenge Europe Zone =

International tennis competition

Details
- Duration: 29 April 1937 – 12 July 1937
- Teams: 20
- Categories: 1937 Europe Zone; 1937 America Zone

Champion
- Winning nation: Germany; Qualified for: 1937 Inter-Zonal Final

The Europe Zone was one of the two regional zones of the 1937 International Lawn Tennis Challenge.

20 teams entered the Europe Zone, with the winner going on to compete in the Inter-Zonal Final against the winner of the America Zone. Germany defeated Czechoslovakia in the final, and went on to face the United States in the Inter-Zonal Final.

== Draw ==
First Round; 29 April–2 May
Germany
bye
Austria
bye
Italy
bye
Monaco
bye
Sweden
bye
Greece
bye
Belgium	3
Hungary	2
Switzerland	3
Ireland	2
Netherlands	0
South Africa	5
New Zealand	3
Taiwan	2
bye
Yugoslavia
bye
Romania
bye
Poland
bye
Czechoslovakia
bye
France
bye
Norway

Second Round; 8–17 May
Munich, Germany
Germany	3
Austria	1
Bologna, Italy (clay)
Italy	5
Monaco	0
Stockholm, Sweden (clay)
Sweden	3
Greece	2
Brussels, Belgium
Belgium	4
Switzerland	1
Brighton, England (clay)
South Africa	4
New Zealand	1
Belgrade, Yugoslavia
Yugoslavia	5
Romania	0
Warsaw, Poland
Poland	0
Czechoslovakia	5
Paris, France (clay)
France	5
Norway	0

Quarterfinals; 4–7 June
Milan, Italy (clay)
Germany	4
Italy	1
Brussels, Belgium (clay)
Sweden	2
Belgium	3
Zagreb, Yugoslavia
South Africa	1
Yugoslavia	4
Prague, Czechoslovakia (clay)
Czechoslovakia	4
France	1

Semifinals; 12–14 June
Berlin, Germany
Germany	4
Belgium	1
Prague, Czechoslovakia
Yugoslavia	1
Czechoslovakia	4

Final; 10–12 July
Berlin, Germany
Germany	4
Czechoslovakia	1

== First round ==
=== Hungary vs. Belgium ===
Hungary
2
Budapest, Hungary
30 April–2 May 1937

Belgium
3

			1	2	3	4	5
1	(Hungary) (Belgium)	György Dallos; André Lacroix	4; 6	7; 9	6; 4	6; 3	6; 3
2	(Hungary) (Belgium)	Emil Gábori; Charles Naeyaert	5; 7	6; 4	6; 4	0; 6	4; 6
3	(Hungary) (Belgium)	Emil Ferenczy / Emil Gábori; Léopold de Borman / Pierre Geelhand de Merxem	6; 2	6; 1	4; 6	3; 6	1; 6
4	(Hungary) (Belgium)	Emil Gábori; André Lacroix	1; 6	2; 6	4; 6
5	(Hungary) (Belgium)	György Dallos; Charles Naeyaert	7; 5	4; 6	6; 2	3; 3		retired

=== Switzerland vs. Ireland ===
Switzerland
3
Montreux, Switzerland
30 April–2 May 1937

Ireland
2

			1	2	3	4	5
1	(Switzerland) (Republic of Ireland)	Max Ellmer; George Lyttleton-Rogers	6; 8	6; 1	1; 6	3; 6
2	(Switzerland) (Republic of Ireland)	Hector Fisher; George McVeagh	6; 4	6; 2	6; 1
3	(Switzerland) (Republic of Ireland)	Hector Fisher / Boris Maneff; George Lyttleton-Rogers / George McVeagh	0; 6	1; 6	7; 5	7; 5	4; 6
4	(Switzerland) (Republic of Ireland)	Hector Fisher; George Lyttleton-Rogers	6; 3	6; 4	4; 6	2; 6	6; 2
5	(Switzerland) (Republic of Ireland)	Max Ellmer; George McVeagh	5; 7	8; 6	6; 4	6; 1

=== Netherlands vs. South Africa ===
Netherlands
0
Amsterdam, Netherlands
30 April–2 May 1937
Clay

South Africa
5

			1	2	3	4	5
1	(Netherlands) (South Africa)	Diederik Teschmacher; Vernon Kirby	2; 6	5; 7	6; 8
2	(Netherlands) (South Africa)	Tod Hughan; Norman Farquharson	1; 6	1; 6	1; 6
3	(Netherlands) (South Africa)	Tod Hughan / Hans van Swol; Norman Farquharson / Vernon Kirby	4; 6	3; 6	2; 6
4	(Netherlands) (South Africa)	Tod Hughan; Eustace Fannin	2; 6	5; 7	6; 3	3; 6
5	(Netherlands) (South Africa)	Diederik Teschmacher; Norman Farquharson	7; 9	1; 6	3; 6

=== China vs. New Zealand ===
Taiwan
2
Sussex County Ground, Brighton, England
29 April–1 May 1937
Clay

New Zealand
3

			1	2	3	4	5
1	(Taiwan) (New Zealand)	Choy Wai-Chuen; Alan Stedman	4; 6	0; 6	2; 6
2	(Taiwan) (New Zealand)	Kho Sin-Kie; Cam Malfroy	6; 0	6; 3	4; 6	6; 2
3	(Taiwan) (New Zealand)	Kho Sin-Kie / Tsui Wai-Pui; Cam Malfroy / Alan Stedman	3; 6	8; 6	3; 6	2; 6
4	(Taiwan) (New Zealand)	Kho Sin-Kie; Alan Stedman	6; 4	6; 4	1; 6	6; 4
5	(Taiwan) (New Zealand)	Choy Wai-Chuen; Cam Malfroy	1; 6	3; 6	1; 6

== Second round ==
=== Germany vs. Austria ===
Germany
3
Munich, Germany
8–10 May 1937

Austria
1

			1	2	3	4	5
1	(Germany) (Austria)	Henner Henkel; Adam Baworowski	6; 1	6; 4	6; 1
2	(Germany) (Austria)	Gottfried von Cramm; Georg von Metaxa	6; 3	6; 4	6; 3
3	(Germany) (Austria)	Gottfried von Cramm / Henner Henkel; Adam Baworowski / Georg von Metaxa	8; 6	11; 9	7; 5
4	(Germany) (Austria)	Edgar Dettmer; Hans Redl	6; 8	1; 6	6; 3	1; 6
5	(Germany) (Austria)	Gottfried von Cramm; Adam Baworowski	8; 10					not completed

=== Italy vs. Monaco ===
Italy
5
Bologna, Italy
8–10 May 1937
Clay

Monaco
0

			1	2	3	4	5
1	(Italy) (Monaco)	Vanni Canepele; Gaston Médécin	6; 0	6; 1	6; 0
2	(Italy) (Monaco)	Giorgio de Stefani; Vladimir Landau	6; 2	6; 0	6; 3
3	(Italy) (Monaco)	Ferruccio Quintavalle / Valentino Taroni; Vladimir Landau / Gaston Médécin	6; 1	6; 3	6; 3
4	(Italy) (Monaco)	Vanni Canepele; Vladimir Landau	6; 0	6; 4	6; 1
5	(Italy) (Monaco)	Giorgio de Stefani; Gaston Médécin	6; 1	7; 5	7; 5

=== Sweden vs. Greece ===
Sweden
3
Tennisstadion, Stockholm, Sweden
12–14 May 1937
Clay

Greece
2

			1	2	3	4	5
1	(Sweden) (Greece)	Kalle Schröder; Lazaros Stalios	6; 3	6; 3	6; 4
2	(Sweden) (Greece)	Sigurd Karlborg; Georgios Nikolaides	6; 4	2; 6	2; 6	3; 6
3	(Sweden) (Greece)	Curt Östberg / Kalle Schröder; Georgios Nikolaides / Lazaros Stalios	6; 2	6; 2	8; 10	3; 6	8; 6
4	(Sweden) (Greece)	Kalle Schröder; Georgios Nikolaides	6; 2	6; 4	6; 4
5	(Sweden) (Greece)	Sigurd Karlborg; Lazaros Stalios	2; 6	2; 6	3; 6

=== Belgium vs. Switzerland ===
Belgium
4
Brussels, Belgium
15–17 May 1937

Switzerland
1

			1	2	3	4	5
1	(Belgium) (Switzerland)	Charles Naeyaert; Max Ellmer	13; 11	6; 3	6; 3
2	(Belgium) (Switzerland)	André Lacroix; Hector Fisher	4; 6	2; 6	6; 8
3	(Belgium) (Switzerland)	Léopold de Borman / André Lacroix; Boris Maneff / Werner Steiner	6; 2	6; 4	6; 1
4	(Belgium) (Switzerland)	André Lacroix; Max Ellmer	6; 0	6; 4	6; 1
5	(Belgium) (Switzerland)	Charles Naeyaert; Hector Fisher	4; 6	6; 0	4; 6	6; 3	7; 5

=== South Africa vs. New Zealand ===
South Africa
4
Sussex County Ground, Brighton, England
8–11 May 1937
Clay

New Zealand
1

			1	2	3	4	5
1	(South Africa) (New Zealand)	Norman Farquharson; Alan Stedman	5; 7	3; 6	6; 3	2; 6
2	(South Africa) (New Zealand)	Vernon Kirby; Cam Malfroy	7; 5	6; 2	6; 3
3	(South Africa) (New Zealand)	Norman Farquharson / Vernon Kirby; Eskell Andrews / Cam Malfroy	7; 5	6; 2	6; 2
4	(South Africa) (New Zealand)	Eustace Fannin; Dennis Coombe	6; 4	6; 4	6; 3
5	(South Africa) (New Zealand)	Vernon Kirby; Eskell Andrews	6; 2	6; 4	6; 3

=== Yugoslavia vs. Romania ===
Yugoslavia
5
Belgrade, Yugoslavia
8–10 May 1937

Romania
0

			1	2	3	4	5
1	(Kingdom of Yugoslavia) (Romania)	Josip Palada; Cristea Caralulis	6; 3	6; 0	2; 6	6; 2
2	(Kingdom of Yugoslavia) (Romania)	Franjo Punčec; Arnulf Schmidt	6; 3	6; 3	7; 5
3	(Kingdom of Yugoslavia) (Romania)	Franjo Kukuljević / Dragutin Mitić; Cristea Caralulis / Arnulf Schmidt	7; 5	6; 3	4; 6	6; 2
4	(Kingdom of Yugoslavia) (Romania)	Franjo Punčec; Cristea Caralulis	6; 4	1; 6	6; 3	6; 2
5	(Kingdom of Yugoslavia) (Romania)	Josip Palada; Arnulf Schmidt	6; 4	6; 3	5; 7	6; 0

=== Poland vs. Czechoslovakia ===
Poland
0
Warsaw, Poland
15–17 May 1937

Czechoslovakia
5

			1	2	3	4	5
1	(Poland) (Czechoslovakia)	Kazimierz Tarlowski; Roderich Menzel	3; 6	4; 6	6; 2	3; 6
2	(Poland) (Czechoslovakia)	Józef Hebda; Ladislav Hecht	2; 6	0; 6	6; 3	1; 6
3	(Poland) (Czechoslovakia)	Józef Hebda / Ignacy Tłoczyński; Josef Caska / Ladislav Hecht	1; 6	7; 5	1; 6	4; 6
4	(Poland) (Czechoslovakia)	Józef Hebda; Roderich Menzel	5; 7	3; 6	3; 6
5	(Poland) (Czechoslovakia)	Kazimierz Tarlowski; Josef Šíba	3; 6	4; 6	3; 6

=== France vs. Norway ===
France
5
Stade Roland Garros, Paris, France
8–10 May 1937
Clay

Norway
0

			1	2	3	4	5
1	(France) (Norway)	Bernard Destremau; Fritz Jenssen	6; 0	6; 3	6; 3
2	(France) (Norway)	Marcel Bernard; Dick Bjurstedt	2; 6	6; 1	6; 0	6; 0
3	(France) (Norway)	Marcel Bernard / Yvon Petra; Jens-Johan Beer / Fritz Jenssen	6; 2	6; 2	6; 2
4	(France) (Norway)	Bernard Destremau; Dick Bjurstedt	7; 5	6; 2	6; 1
5	(France) (Norway)	Yvon Petra; Fritz Jenssen	6; 1	6; 3	4; 6	7; 5

== Quarterfinals ==
=== Italy vs. Germany ===
Italy
1
Milan, Italy
4–6 June 1937
Clay

Germany
4

			1	2	3	4	5
1	(Italy) (Germany)	Vanni Canepele; Gottfried von Cramm	1; 6	4; 6	6; 1	4; 6
2	(Italy) (Germany)	Giorgio de Stefani; Henner Henkel	6; 2	6; 3	5; 7	6; 2
3	(Italy) (Germany)	Ferruccio Quintavalle / Valentino Taroni; Gottfried von Cramm / Henner Henkel	3; 6	1; 6	1; 6
4	(Italy) (Germany)	Vanni Canepele; Henner Henkel	6; 3	3; 6	1; 6	4; 6
5	(Italy) (Germany)	Giorgio de Stefani; Gottfried von Cramm	0; 6	1; 6	4; 6

=== Belgium vs. Sweden ===
Belgium
3
Royal Léopold Club, Brussels, Belgium
4–6 June 1937
Clay

Sweden
2

			1	2	3	4	5
1	(Belgium) (Sweden)	André Lacroix; Kalle Schröder	3; 6	6; 3	0; 6	6; 4	2; 6
2	(Belgium) (Sweden)	Charles Naeyaert; Stig Mårtensson	6; 1	6; 2	6; 1
3	(Belgium) (Sweden)	Léopold de Borman / André Lacroix; Curt Östberg / Kalle Schröder	6; 0	6; 4	6; 4
4	(Belgium) (Sweden)	Charles Naeyaert; Kalle Schröder	9; 7	2; 6	0; 6	3; 6
5	(Belgium) (Sweden)	André Lacroix; Stig Mårtensson	6; 2	6; 0	6; 3

=== Yugoslavia vs. South Africa ===
Yugoslavia
4
Zagreb, Yugoslavia
5–7 June 1937

South Africa
1

			1	2	3	4	5
1	(Kingdom of Yugoslavia) (South Africa)	Franjo Punčec; Vernon Kirby	1; 6	6; 0	6; 3	2; 6	6; 4
2	(Kingdom of Yugoslavia) (South Africa)	Josip Palada; Norman Farquharson	3; 6	3; 6	6; 3	6; 0	6; 3
3	(Kingdom of Yugoslavia) (South Africa)	Franjo Kukuljević / Dragutin Mitić; Norman Farquharson / Vernon Kirby	2; 6	3; 6	2; 6
4	(Kingdom of Yugoslavia) (South Africa)	Josip Palada; Vernon Kirby	6; 1	6; 4	6; 2
5	(Kingdom of Yugoslavia) (South Africa)	Franjo Punčec; Norman Farquharson	6; 1	6; 1	6; 1

=== Czechoslovakia vs. France ===
Czechoslovakia
4
Prague, Czechoslovakia
5–7 June 1937
Clay

France
1

			1	2	3	4	5
1	(Czechoslovakia) (France)	Roderich Menzel; Christian Boussus	6; 2	6; 3	6; 4
2	(Czechoslovakia) (France)	Ladislav Hecht; Bernard Destremau	6; 3	6; 3	6; 1
3	(Czechoslovakia) (France)	Ladislav Hecht / Roderich Menzel; Jean Borotra / Yvon Petra	3; 6	6; 2	2; 6	3; 6
4	(Czechoslovakia) (France)	Roderich Menzel; Bernard Destremau	6; 0	6; 3	6; 4
5	(Czechoslovakia) (France)	Ladislav Hecht; Christian Boussus	2; 6	6; 1	7; 5	6; 0

== Semifinals ==
=== Germany vs. Belgium ===
Germany
4
Berlin, Germany
12–14 June 1937

Belgium
1

			1	2	3	4	5
1	(Germany) (Belgium)	Henner Henkel; André Lacroix	6; 1	6; 1	6; 1
2	(Germany) (Belgium)	Gottfried von Cramm; Charles Naeyaert	6; 3	6; 0	6; 4
3	(Germany) (Belgium)	Gottfried von Cramm / Henner Henkel; Léopold de Borman / André Lacroix	6; 4	6; 3	6; 4
4	(Germany) (Belgium)	Henner Henkel; Charles Naeyaert	6; 3	6; 2	6; 2
5	(Germany) (Belgium)	Edgar Dettmer; André Lacroix	4; 6	6; 3	2; 6	6; 8

=== Czechoslovakia vs. Yugoslavia ===
Czechoslovakia
4
Prague, Czechoslovakia
12–14 June 1937

Yugoslavia
1

			1	2	3	4	5
1	(Czechoslovakia) (Kingdom of Yugoslavia)	Roderich Menzel; Josip Palada	6; 2	6; 1	6; 0
2	(Czechoslovakia) (Kingdom of Yugoslavia)	Ladislav Hecht; Franjo Punčec	7; 5	6; 2	6; 3
3	(Czechoslovakia) (Kingdom of Yugoslavia)	Ladislav Hecht / Roderich Menzel; Josip Palada / Franjo Punčec	2; 6	6; 1	6; 0	7; 9	6; 1
4	(Czechoslovakia) (Kingdom of Yugoslavia)	František Cejnar; Franjo Punčec	7; 5	7; 5	3; 6	7; 5
5	(Czechoslovakia) (Kingdom of Yugoslavia)	Josef Šíba; Josip Palada	3; 6	3; 6	5; 7

== Final ==
=== Germany vs. Czechoslovakia ===
Germany
4
Berlin, Germany
10–12 July 1937

Czechoslovakia
1

			1	2	3	4	5
1	(Germany) (Czechoslovakia)	Henner Henkel; Ladislav Hecht	6; 1	7; 5	7; 5
2	(Germany) (Czechoslovakia)	Gottfried von Cramm; Roderich Menzel	3; 6	4; 6	6; 4	6; 3	6; 2
3	(Germany) (Czechoslovakia)	Gottfried von Cramm / Henner Henkel; Josef Caska / Ladislav Hecht	6; 1	6; 2	10; 12	6; 0
4	(Germany) (Czechoslovakia)	Gottfried von Cramm; Ladislav Hecht	6; 3	7; 5	6; 2
5	(Germany) (Czechoslovakia)	Hans Denker; František Cejnar	6; 4	6; 3	4; 6	4; 6	2; 6
