= 1934 Wimbledon Championships – Men's singles =

Men's singles
- 1934 Wimbledon Championships

Final
- Champion: (United Kingdom) Fred Perry
- Runner-up: (Australia) Jack Crawford
- Score: 6–3, 6–0, 7–5

Details
- Draw: 128 (10Q)
- Seeds: 8

Events
Singles	men	women		boys	girls
Doubles	men	women	mixed	boys	girls
- Wimbledon Championships

Fred Perry defeated the defending champion Jack Crawford in the final, 6–3, 6–0, 7–5 to win the gentlemen's singles tennis title at the 1934 Wimbledon Championships.

== Seeds ==
1. (Australia) Jack Crawford (final)
2. (United Kingdom) Fred Perry (champion)
3. (Germany) Gottfried von Cramm (fourth round)
4. (United Kingdom) Bunny Austin (quarterfinals)
5. (United States) Frank Shields (semifinals)
6. (United States) Lester Stoefen (quarterfinals)
7. (United States) Sidney Wood (semifinals)
8. (Italy) Giorgio de Stefani (second round)

Click on the seed number of a player to go to their draw section.

== Draw ==
Key

- Q = Qualifier
- WC = Wild card
- LL = Lucky loser
- Alt = Alternate
- ITF = ITF entry
- PR = Protected ranking
- SR = Special ranking
- SE = Special exempt
- JE = Junior exempt
- JR = Junior Accelerator Programme entrant
- CO = College Accelerator Programme entrant
- NG = Next Gen Accelerator Program entrant
- w/o = Walkover
- r = Retired
- d = Defaulted

=== Finals ===
Quarterfinals
1	(Australia) Jack Crawford	7	2	7	6
6	(United States) Lester Stoefen	5	6	5	0
4	(United Kingdom) Bunny Austin	6	6	5	3	5
5	(United States) Frank Shields	4	2	7	6	7
2	(United Kingdom) Fred Perry	6	2	7	10
(United States) George Lott	4	6	5	8
(South Africa) Vernon Kirby	1	4	6	0
7	(United States) Sidney Wood	6	6	3	6

Semifinals
1	(Australia) Jack Crawford	2	4	6	6	6
5	(United States) Frank Shields	6	6	4	3	4
2	(United Kingdom) Fred Perry	6	3	7	5	6
7	(United States) Sidney Wood	3	6	5	7	3

Final
1	(Australia) Jack Crawford	3	0	5
2	(United Kingdom) Fred Perry	6	6	7

=== Top half ===
==== Section 1 ====
First round
1	(Australia) Jack Crawford	6	7	8
(Poland) Ignacy Tłoczyński	2	5	6
(Germany) Heinrich Kleinschroth	3	4	3
(Germany) Henner Henkel	6	6	6
(United Kingdom) Eric Peters	4	8	6	6	2
(United Kingdom) Arthur Vinall	6	6	8	4	6
(United Kingdom) Laurie Shaffi	6	6	4	4
(United Kingdom) Ian Collins	8	3	6	6
(United Kingdom) Pat Sherwood	7	4	6	1	6
(Belgium) Léopold de Borman	5	6	3	6	3
(United Kingdom) Keats Lester	6	6	6
(United Kingdom) George Gibbs	2	3	4
(Sweden) Curt Östberg	4	2	1
(France) Jean Lesueur	6	6	6
(Japan) Jiro Yamagishi
(United States) Wilmer Hines	w/o

Second round
1	(Australia) J Crawford	6	6	3	6
(Germany) H Henkel	2	3	6	4
(United Kingdom) A Vinall	2	3	4
(United Kingdom) I Collins	6	6	6
(United Kingdom) P Sherwood	6	2	4	3
(United Kingdom) K Lester	3	6	6	6
(France) J Lesueur	1	2	3
(Japan) J Yamagishi	6	6	6

Third round
1	(Australia) J Crawford	4	6	6	6
(United Kingdom) I Collins	6	2	0	1
(United Kingdom) K Lester	7	5	4
(Japan) J Yamagishi	9	7	6

Fourth round
1	(Australia) J Crawford	4	6	6	6
(Japan) J Yamagishi	6	4	2	2

==== Section 2 ====
First round
6	(United States) Lester Stoefen	6	7	11
(Egypt) Pierre Grandguillot	2	5	9
(United Kingdom) John Olliff	6	6	6
(United Kingdom) Paul Partridge	4	4	2
(France) Marcel Bernard	6	6	6
(United States) Bill Breese	1	1	2
(United Kingdom) Laddie Wheatcroft	1	6	2	1
(United Kingdom) Charles Kingsley	6	3	6	6
(Italy) Emanuele Sertorio	6	6	6
Q	(United Kingdom) Brian Sturgeon	4	0	2
(United Kingdom) Harry Lee	6	6	10
(United Kingdom) Henry Burrows	3	4	8
(Netherlands) Gerard Leembruggen	4	4	3
(United Kingdom) Jack Lysaght	6	6	6
(Czechoslovakia) Friedrich Rohrer	6	8	2	6
(United Kingdom) David Williams	2	6	6	1

Second round
6	(United States) L Stoefen	6	6	6
(United Kingdom) J Olliff	1	2	2
(France) M Bernard	6	6	5	4	6
(United Kingdom) C Kingsley	3	4	7	6	3
(Italy) E Sertorio	4	6	3	2
(United Kingdom) H Lee	6	4	6	6
(United Kingdom) J Lysaght	6	6	6
(Czechoslovakia) F Rohrer	3	1	3

Third round
6	(United States) L Stoefen	6	6	6
(France) M Bernard	4	4	3
(United Kingdom) H Lee	6	10	7
(United Kingdom) J Lysaght	1	8	5

Fourth round
6	(United States) L Stoefen	6	6	6
(United Kingdom) H Lee	2	4	4

==== Section 3 ====
First round
4	(United Kingdom) Bunny Austin	6	6	6
(India) Mohammed Sleem	3	1	2
Q	(United Kingdom) Henry Billington	1	6	3	6	3
(Germany) Hans Denker	6	3	6	1	6
Q	(United States) Henry Culley	3	2	6
(Australia) Don Turnbull	6	6	8
Q	(United Kingdom) George Godsell	4	3	1
(Japan) Ryuki Miki	6	6	6
(United Kingdom) Wilfred Freeman
(Soviet Union) Sergei Rodzianko	w/o
(United Kingdom) Ted Avory	5	6	6	4	8
(United Kingdom) Herman David	7	4	4	6	6
(Spain) Enrique Maier	6	6	6
(Republic of Ireland) Henry Purcell	2	3	4
(Czechoslovakia) Ladislav Hecht	6	13	6
(United States) Teddy Burwell	3	11	0

Second round
4	(United Kingdom) H Austin	6	6	6
(Germany) H Denker	1	1	2
(Australia) D Turnbull	6	6	6
(Japan) T Miki	3	1	1
(United Kingdom) W Freeman	4	4	1
(United Kingdom) E Avory	6	6	6
(Spain) E Maier	3	3	2
(Czechoslovakia) L Hecht	6	6	6

Third round
4	(United Kingdom) H Austin	6	6	6
(Australia) D Turnbull	1	4	3
(United Kingdom) E Avory	5	2	1
(Czechoslovakia) L Hecht	7	6	6

Fourth round
4	(United Kingdom) H Austin	6	6	6
(Czechoslovakia) L Hecht	3	1	2

==== Section 4 ====
First round
5	(United States) Frank Shields	6	6	6
(No citizenship) Daniel Prenn	3	3	4
(France) Pierre Henri Landry	3	11	6	6
(United Kingdom) Dickie Ritchie	6	9	3	3
(Japan) Iwao Aoki	3	1	3
(Switzerland) Hector Fisher	6	6	6
(United Kingdom) Grady Frank	3	4	6	6	0
(Hungary) Béla von Kehrling	6	6	1	3	0^{r}
(United Kingdom) Charles Hare	3	1	4
(France) Christian Boussus	6	6	6
(Netherlands) Hendrik Timmer	2	9	3	5
(Austria) Hermann Artens	6	7	6	7
(South Africa) Pat Spence	4	5	5
(New Zealand) Cam Malfroy	6	7	7
(United Kingdom) Bob Tinkler	6	10	4	0^{r}
(Belgium) Pierre Geelhand de Merxem	2	8	6	0

Second round
5	(United States) F Shields	6	6	6
(France) PH Landry	4	4	0
(Switzerland) H Fisher	6	6	6
(United Kingdom) G Frank	4	3	0
(France) C Boussus	6	6	7
(Austria) H Artens	3	3	5
(New Zealand) C Malfroy	6	6	6
(Belgium) P Geelhand de Merxem	3	1	2

Third round
5	(United States) F Shields
(Switzerland) H Fisher	w/o
(France) C Boussus	6	6	6
(New Zealand) C Malfroy	1	2	3

Fourth round
5	(United States) F Shields	6	3	6	7	8
(France) C Boussus	4	6	4	9	6

=== Bottom half ===
==== Section 5 ====
First round
2	(United Kingdom) Fred Perry	6	6	5	6
(United Kingdom) Raymond Tuckey	2	2	7	0
(India) Prince of Kutch	1	3	3
(United States) R. Norris Williams	6	6	6
(New Zealand) Alan Stedman	1	5	6
(Czechoslovakia) Roderich Menzel	6	7	8
(France) Antoine Gentien	4	9	6	6
(Netherlands) Josef Knottenbelt	6	7	3	1
(United Kingdom) Bobby Meredith	3	9	2	6	6
(United Kingdom) Alan Brown	6	7	6	2	0
(Republic of Ireland) George Lyttleton-Rogers	6	4	4	6	6
(United Kingdom) Desmond Morris	1	6	6	2	4
(Switzerland) Charles Aeschlimann	1	1	4
(Sweden) Karl Schröder	6	6	6
(South Africa) John Kitson	1	2	10
(Australia) Adrian Quist	6	6	12

Second round
2	(United Kingdom) F Perry	6	6	6
(United States) RN Williams	2	2	0
(Czechoslovakia) R Menzel	6	6	6
(France) A Gentien	1	1	2
(United Kingdom) G Meredith	5	4	5
(Republic of Ireland) G Lyttleton-Rogers	7	6	7
(Sweden) K Schröder	3	6	2	2
(Australia) A Quist	6	1	6	6

Third round
2	(United Kingdom) F Perry	0	6	5	6	6
(Czechoslovakia) R Menzel	6	3	7	4	2
(Republic of Ireland) G Lyttleton-Rogers	5	1	5
(Australia) A Quist	7	6	7

Fourth round
2	(United Kingdom) F Perry	6	6	6
(Australia) A Quist	2	3	4

==== Section 6 ====
First round
8	(Italy) Giorgio de Stefani	7	10	7	7
(Monaco) Vladimir Landau	5	8	9	5
Q	(United Kingdom) Richard Williams	3	1	7	5
(United States) George Lott	6	6	5	7
(United Kingdom) Nigel Sharpe	6	6	6
(United Kingdom) Arnold England	1	3	4
(Japan) Jiro Fujikura	6	6	8
(France) Emmanuel du Plaix	2	3	6
(United Kingdom) Douglas Freshwater	3	3	3
(Belgium) André Lacroix	6	6	6
(Australia) Harry Hopman	6	6	1	6
(Germany) Werner Menzel	2	3	6	3
(France) Jacques Brugnon
(France) Paul Féret	w/o
(Austria) Georg von Metaxa	3	4	4
(France) André Merlin	6	6	6

Second round
8	(Italy) G de Stefani	6	3	4	4
(United States) G Lott	3	6	6	6
(United Kingdom) N Sharpe	6	3	1	7	6
(Japan) J Fujikura	4	6	6	5	4
(Belgium) A Lacroix	1	5	6	4
(Australia) H Hopman	6	7	2	6
(France) J Brugnon	2	6	4	3
(France) A Merlin	6	3	6	6

Third round
(United States) G Lott	7	2	6	1	6
(United Kingdom) N Sharpe	5	6	3	6	4
(Australia) H Hopman	7	6	6
(France) A Merlin	5	2	2

Fourth round
(United States) G Lott	4	6	6	6
(Australia) H Hopman	6	3	2	2

==== Section 7 ====
First round
3	(Germany) Gottfried von Cramm
(Poland) Józef Hebda	w/o
(Denmark) Anker Jacobsen	11	6	6
Q	(India) Donald Rutnam	9	4	1
(United Kingdom) Jimmy Jones	6	6	6
(United Kingdom) Donald MacPhail	1	0	2
(New Zealand) Buster Andrews	8	6	6
(United Kingdom) Frank Wilde	6	4	2
(Hungary) Emil Gábori	4	6	6	6
(United Kingdom) Colin Ritchie	6	3	1	4
(Austria) Franz Matejka	2	9	6	6
(United Kingdom) Jimmy Reddall	6	7	1	0
Q	(United Kingdom) Norman Taylor	5	1	6	2
(France) André Martin-Legeay	7	6	0	6
(Italy) Alberto del Bono	w/o
(South Africa) Vernon Kirby

Second round
3	(Germany) G von Cramm	6	6	9
(Denmark) A Jacobsen	2	3	7
(United Kingdom) C Jones	2	2	6
(New Zealand) E Andrews	6	6	8
(Hungary) E Gábori	8	1	2	3
(Austria) F-W Matejka	6	6	6	6
(France) A Martin-Legeay	6	4	6	5	0
(South Africa) V Kirby	4	6	2	7	6

Third round
3	(Germany) G von Cramm	6	6	6
(New Zealand) E Andrews	1	4	4
(Austria) F-W Matejka	6	4	8	5	2
(South Africa) V Kirby	3	6	6	7	6

Fourth round
3	(Germany) G von Cramm	2	6	4	2
(South Africa) V Kirby	6	2	6	6

==== Section 8 ====
First round
7	(United States) Sidney Wood	10	6	6
(Australia) Vivian McGrath	8	4	4
(Switzerland) Max Ellmer	6	6	6
Q	(India) Man-Mohan Bhandari	1	2	2
Q	(United Kingdom) Douglas Jarvis	7	2	6	6
(United Kingdom) Eric Attewell	5	6	4	0
(United Kingdom) Guy Cooper	6	6	6
(Australia) Joseph Clynton-Reed	3	4	3
(United Kingdom) Pat Hughes	6	6	6
Q	(United Kingdom) Richard Turnbull	0	1	0
(United States) David Jones	6	6	6
(Belgium) Charles Naeyaert	1	1	2
(United Kingdom) Kenneth Gandar-Dower	6	5	4	1
(Japan) Hideo Nishimura	4	7	6	6
(Netherlands) Ody Koopman	0	2	3
(Czechoslovakia) Josef Šíba	6	6	6

Second round
7	(United States) S Wood	6	5	6	7
(Switzerland) M Ellmer	3	7	0	5
Q	(United Kingdom) D Jarvis	3	2	3
(United Kingdom) G Cooper	6	6	6
(United Kingdom) P Hughes	6	4	5	6	4
(United States) D Jones	2	6	7	1	6
(Japan) H Nishimura	6	6	6	6	7
(Czechoslovakia) J Šíba	8	4	8	2	9

Third round
7	(United States) S Wood	4	6	6	6
(United Kingdom) G Cooper	6	2	2	1
(United States) D Jones	4	4	6	6	6
(Czechoslovakia) J Šíba	6	6	4	1	3

Fourth round
7	(United States) S Wood	6	6	6
(United States) D Jones	3	3	4

Preceded by 1934 French Championships	Grand Slams; Men's Singles	Succeeded by 1934 U.S. Championships
