= 1937 Wimbledon Championships – Men's doubles =

Men's doubles
- 1937 Wimbledon Championships

Final
- Champions: (United States) Don Budge (United States) Gene Mako
- Runners-up: (United Kingdom) Pat Hughes (United Kingdom) Raymond Tuckey
- Score: 6–0, 6–4, 6–8, 6–1

Details
- Draw: 64 (5Q)
- Seeds: 4

Events
Singles	men	women		boys	girls
Doubles	men	women	mixed	boys	girls
- Wimbledon Championships

Don Budge and Gene Mako defeated the defending champions Pat Hughes and Raymond Tuckey in the final, 6–0, 6–4, 6–8, 6–1 to win the gentlemen doubles tennis title at the 1937 Wimbledon Championship.

== Seeds ==
1. (United Kingdom) Pat Hughes / (United Kingdom) Raymond Tuckey (final)
2. (United States) Don Budge / (United States) Gene Mako (champions)
3. (Germany) Gottfried von Cramm / (Germany) Henner Henkel (semifinals)
4. (Australia) Jack Crawford / (Australia) Vivian McGrath (first round)

Click on the seed number of a player to go to their draw section.

== Draw ==
Key

- Q = Qualifier
- WC = Wild card
- LL = Lucky loser
- Alt = Alternate
- ITF = ITF entry
- PR = Protected ranking
- SR = Special ranking
- SE = Special exempt
- JE = Junior exempt
- JR = Junior Accelerator Programme entrant
- CO = College Accelerator Programme entrant
- NG = Next Gen Accelerator Program entrant
- w/o = Walkover
- r = Retired
- d = Defaulted

=== Finals ===
Quarterfinals
1	(United Kingdom) Pat Hughes (United Kingdom) Raymond Tuckey	6	6	6
(Japan) Fumiteru Nakano (Japan) Jiro Yamagishi	2	2	2
(Czechoslovakia) Ladislav Hecht (Czechoslovakia) Roderich Menzel	6	6	6
(France) Jacques Jamain (Austria) Georg von Metaxa	3	4	2
(United Kingdom) Charles Hare (United Kingdom) Frank Wilde	4	6	4	5
3	(Germany) Gottfried von Cramm (Germany) Henner Henkel	6	4	6	7
(Australia) John Bromwich (Australia) Clifford Sproule	2	5	8	2
2	(United States) Don Budge (United States) Gene Mako	6	7	6	6

Semifinals
1	(United Kingdom) Pat Hughes (United Kingdom) Raymond Tuckey	6	6	6
(Czechoslovakia) Ladislav Hecht (Czechoslovakia) Roderich Menzel	2	2	4
3	(Germany) Gottfried von Cramm (Germany) Henner Henkel	6	6	2	4	3
2	(United States) Don Budge (United States) Gene Mako	4	4	6	6	6

Final
1	(United Kingdom) Pat Hughes (United Kingdom) Raymond Tuckey	0	4	8	1
2	(United States) Don Budge (United States) Gene Mako	6	6	6	6

=== Top half ===
==== Section 1 ====
First round
1	(United Kingdom) Pat Hughes (United Kingdom) Raymond Tuckey	6	6	16
(France) Marcel Bernard (France) Jean Borotra	4	3	14
(Republic of Ireland) George McVeagh (Republic of Ireland) George Lyttleton-Rogers	5	6	6	6
(United Kingdom) John Anderson (United Kingdom) John Collins	7	4	3	4
Q	(United Kingdom) Derek Bull (United Kingdom) CF Duncan	4	8	3	3
(Switzerland) Charles Aeschlimann (Switzerland) Max Ellmer	6	6	6	6
(United Kingdom) Harold Hare (Sweden) Stig Mårtensson	2	7	3
(United States) Charles Harris (United States) Hal Surface	6	9	6
(United Kingdom) Murray Deloford (United Kingdom) Laurie Shaffi	6	1	6	6	7
(United Kingdom) Eric Attewell (United Kingdom) Jack Harrison	8	6	3	4	5
Q	(United Kingdom) Charles Fawcus (United Kingdom) JR Fawcus	6	4	1	0
(United Kingdom) Ralph Nichols (United Kingdom) David Williams	2	6	6	6
(United Kingdom) George Godsell (Republic of Ireland) Henry Purcell	6	2	6	2	4
(United Kingdom) Dennis Cook (United Kingdom) Eric Filby	3	6	4	6	6
(South Africa) Colin Eedes (South Africa) Eustace Fannin	3	1	1
(Japan) Fumiteru Nakano (Japan) Jiro Yamagishi	6	6	6

Second round
1	(United Kingdom) P Hughes (United Kingdom) R Tuckey	11	4	6	6
(Republic of Ireland) George McVeagh (Republic of Ireland) G Lyttleton-Rogers	9	6	0	4
(Switzerland) C Aeschlimann (Switzerland) M Ellmer
(United States) C Harris (United States) H Surface	w/o
(United Kingdom) M Deloford (United Kingdom) L Shaffi	3	5	2
(United Kingdom) R Nichols (United Kingdom) D Williams	6	7	6
(United Kingdom) D Cook (United Kingdom) E Filby	3	3	7	6	2
(Japan) F Nakano (Japan) J Yamagishi	6	6	5	3	6

Third round
1	(United Kingdom) P Hughes (United Kingdom) R Tuckey	6	6	6
(Switzerland) C Aeschlimann (Switzerland) M Ellmer	2	3	2
(United Kingdom) R Nichols (United Kingdom) D Williams	4	4	0
(Japan) F Nakano (Japan) J Yamagishi	6	6	6

Quarterfinals
1	(United Kingdom) P Hughes (United Kingdom) R Tuckey	6	6	6
(Japan) F Nakano (Japan) J Yamagishi	2	2	2

==== Section 2 ====
First round
4	(Australia) Jack Crawford (Australia) Vivian McGrath	3	3	2
(Czechoslovakia) Ladislav Hecht (Czechoslovakia) Roderich Menzel	6	6	6
(United States) Bryan Grant (United States) Wayne Sabin	7	6	6
(United Kingdom) Jimmy Jones (United Kingdom) Ronnie Shayes	5	4	4
(France) Pierre Goldschmidt (United Kingdom) AN Other	w/o
LL	(United Kingdom) Cecil Betts (United Kingdom) Jimmy Reddall
(United Kingdom) Ted Avory (United Kingdom) Harry Lee	0	1	7	3
(Kingdom of Yugoslavia) Josip Palada (Kingdom of Yugoslavia) Franjo Punčec	6	6	5	6
(United Kingdom) Alan Brown (United Kingdom) Jock Findlay	0	4	4
(New Zealand) Buster Andrews (Italy) Ferruccio Quintavalle	6	6	6
Q	(United Kingdom) Stan Clark (United Kingdom) Leonard Grossmith	4	2	6	6	5
(United States) Frank Parker (Italy) Giorgio de Stefani	6	6	4	4	7
(Kingdom of Yugoslavia) Franjo Kukuljević (India) Prince of Kutch	3	5	16	6	3
(France) Jacques Jamain (Austria) Georg von Metaxa	6	7	14	3	6
(Norway) Fritz Jenssen (Germany) Heinrich Kleinschroth	2	1	9	4
(Netherlands) Tod Hughan (Netherlands) Hans van Swol	6	6	7	6

Second round
(Czechoslovakia) L Hecht (Czechoslovakia) R Menzel	5	9	6	6
(United States) B Grant (United States) W Sabin	7	7	4	1
LL	(United Kingdom) C Betts (United Kingdom) J Reddall	1	6	4	5
(Kingdom of Yugoslavia) J Palada (Kingdom of Yugoslavia) F Punčec	6	4	6	7
(New Zealand) E Andrews (Italy) F Quintavalle	4	6	3	3
(United States) F Parker (Italy) G de Stefani	6	1	6	6
(France) J Jamain (Austria) G von Metaxa	6	6	6
(Netherlands) T Hughan (Netherlands) A van Swol	3	2	2

Third round
(Czechoslovakia) L Hecht (Czechoslovakia) R Menzel	6	6	6
(Kingdom of Yugoslavia) J Palada (Kingdom of Yugoslavia) F Punčec	2	2	3
(United States) F Parker (Italy) G de Stefani	3	4	4
(France) J Jamain (Austria) G von Metaxa	6	6	6

Quarterfinals
(Czechoslovakia) L Hecht (Czechoslovakia) R Menzel	6	6	6
(France) J Jamain (Austria) G von Metaxa	3	4	2

=== Bottom half ===
==== Section 3 ====
First round
(United Kingdom) Charles Hare (United Kingdom) Frank Wilde	6	6	5	6
(United Kingdom) Edmund David (United Kingdom) Herman David	2	2	7	1
(United States) Lawrence Hall (United Kingdom) Eric Peters	6	8	6
(United Kingdom) Jimmy Hunt (United Kingdom) Colin Ritchie	4	6	3
(United Kingdom) Henry Billington (United Kingdom) Bobby Meredith	2	3	4
(United Kingdom) Guy Cooper (United Kingdom) Bob Tinkler	6	6	6
Q	(United Kingdom) Reginald Bessemer-Clark (Australia) Alan Coldham	3	6	6	6
(United Kingdom) John Olliff (United Kingdom) Nigel Sharpe	6	3	4	3
(Republic of China (1912–1949)) Ho Jin (United Kingdom) Bob Mulliken	6	1	2
(South Africa) Norman Farquharson (South Africa) Vernon Kirby	8	6	6
(France) Jacques Brugnon (New Zealand) Alan Stedman	6	6	2	6
(United Kingdom) Claude Lister (United Kingdom) Norman Taylor	2	1	6	3
(Belgium) Pierre Geelhand de Merxem (Belgium) André Lacroix	6	6	3	6
(Republic of Ireland) Raymond Egan (South Africa) Eustace Fannin	3	3	6	0
(United Kingdom) Freddie Della Porta (United Kingdom) Leslie Walter	3	7	0
3	(Germany) Gottfried von Cramm (Germany) Henner Henkel	6	9	6

Second round
(United Kingdom) C Hare (United Kingdom) F Wilde	6	6	7
(United States) L Hall (United Kingdom) E Peters	2	3	5
(United Kingdom) G Cooper (United Kingdom) R Tinkler	6	8	6	6
Q	(United Kingdom) R Bessemer-Clark (Australia) A Coldham	4	10	3	4
(South Africa) N Farquharson (South Africa) V Kirby	6	6	6
(France) J Brugnon (New Zealand) A Stedman	4	3	1
(Belgium) P Geelhand de Merxem (Belgium) A Lacroix	2	6	6
3	(Germany) G von Cramm (Germany) H Henkel	6	8	8

Third round
(United Kingdom) C Hare (United Kingdom) F Wilde	6	6	6
(United Kingdom) G Cooper (United Kingdom) R Tinkler	1	2	2
(South Africa) N Farquharson (South Africa) V Kirby	3	6	6	5	4
3	(Germany) G von Cramm (Germany) H Henkel	6	0	2	7	6

Quarterfinals
(United Kingdom) C Hare (United Kingdom) F Wilde	4	6	4	5
3	(Germany) G von Cramm (Germany) H Henkel	6	4	6	7

==== Section 4 ====
First round
(Republic of China (1912–1949)) Choy Wai-Chuen (Belgium) Jack Van den Eynde	5	8	6	5	4
(United Kingdom) Jack Lysaght (United Kingdom) Pat Sherwood	7	6	1	7	6
(Republic of China (1912–1949)) Kho Sin-Kie (Sweden) Karl Schröder	6	6	6
(New Zealand) Dennis Coombe (New Zealand) James Giesen	1	4	2
(United Kingdom) Ian Collins (United Kingdom) Donald MacPhail	3	4	6	6	6
(Denmark) Helge Plougmann (United States) Bill Robertson	6	6	3	3	2
(Australia) John Bromwich (Australia) Cliff Sproule	4	6	6	6
(Belgium) Léopold de Borman (United Kingdom) Laddie Wheatcroft	6	3	2	3
(France) Christian Boussus (France) Yvon Petra	6	6	8
(United Kingdom) John Comery (United Kingdom) Roland Morton	2	4	6
(United Kingdom) Don Butler (United Kingdom) Dickie Ritchie	6	6	6	3	11
Q	(United Kingdom) Tommy Anderson (United Kingdom) TC Braithwaite	3	2	8	6	9
(Switzerland) Hector Fisher (Switzerland) Boris Maneff	4	6	3	6	8
(United Kingdom) Brian Sturgeon (United Kingdom) Bill Manby	6	4	6	3	6
(Germany) Daniel Prenn (United Kingdom) Jack Warboys	2	6	1
2	(United States) Don Budge (United States) Gene Mako	6	8	6

Second round
(United Kingdom) J Lysaght (United Kingdom) P Sherwood	4	6	3	3
(Republic of China (1912–1949)) S-K Kho (Sweden) K Schröder	6	3	6	6
(United Kingdom) I Collins (United Kingdom) D MacPhail	3	4	2
(Australia) J Bromwich (Australia) C Sproule	6	6	6
(France) C Boussus (France) Y Petra	6	6	7
(United Kingdom) D Butler (United Kingdom) R Ritchie	3	4	5
(Switzerland) H Fisher (Switzerland) B Maneff	1	1	3
2	(United States) D Budge (United States) G Mako	6	6	6

Third round
(Republic of China (1912–1949)) S-K Kho (Sweden) K Schröder	6	5	2	4
(Australia) J Bromwich (Australia) C Sproule	4	7	6	6
(France) C Boussus (France) Y Petra	4	4	8
2	(United States) D Budge (United States) G Mako	6	6	10

Quarterfinals
(Australia) J Bromwich (Australia) C Sproule	2	5	8	2
2	(United States) D Budge (United States) G Mako	6	7	6	6
