= 1937 Wimbledon Championships – Men's singles =

Men's singles
- 1937 Wimbledon Championships

Final
- Champion: (United States) Don Budge
- Runner-up: (Germany) Gottfried von Cramm
- Score: 6–3, 6–4, 6–2

Details
- Draw: 128 (10Q)
- Seeds: 8

Events
Singles	men	women		boys	girls
Doubles	men	women	mixed	boys	girls
- Wimbledon Championships

Don Budge defeated Gottfried von Cramm in the final, 6–3, 6–4, 6–2 to win the gentlemen's singles tennis title at the 1937 Wimbledon Championships. Fred Perry was the defending champion, but was ineligible to compete after turning professional at the end of the 1936 season.

== Seeds ==
1. (United States) Don Budge (champion)
2. (Germany) Gottfried von Cramm (final)
3. (Germany) Henner Henkel (quarterfinals)
4. (United Kingdom) Bunny Austin (semifinals)
5. (United States) Bryan Grant (quarterfinals)
6. (Czechoslovakia) Roderich Menzel (first round)
7. (Australia) Vivian McGrath (quarterfinals)
8. (United States) Frank Parker (semifinals)

Click on the seed number of a player to go to their draw section.

== Draw ==
Key

- Q = Qualifier
- WC = Wild card
- LL = Lucky loser
- Alt = Alternate
- ITF = ITF entry
- PR = Protected ranking
- SR = Special ranking
- SE = Special exempt
- JE = Junior exempt
- JR = Junior Accelerator Programme entrant
- CO = College Accelerator Programme entrant
- NG = Next Gen Accelerator Program entrant
- w/o = Walkover
- r = Retired
- d = Defaulted

=== Finals ===
Quarterfinals
2	(Germany) Gottfried von Cramm	6	8	3	2	6
(Australia) Jack Crawford	3	6	6	6	2
4	(United Kingdom) Bunny Austin	6	7	6
5	(United States) Bryan Grant	1	5	4
8	(United States) Frank Parker	6	7	4	4	6
3	(Germany) Henner Henkel	3	5	6	6	2
7	(Australia) Vivian McGrath	3	1	4
1	(United States) Don Budge	6	6	6

Semifinals
2	(Germany) Gottfried von Cramm	8	6	12	6
4	(United Kingdom) Bunny Austin	6	3	14	1
8	(United States) Frank Parker	6	4	4	1
1	(United States) Don Budge	2	6	6	6

Final
2	(Germany) Gottfried von Cramm	3	4	2
1	(United States) Don Budge	6	6	6

=== Top half ===
==== Section 1 ====
First round
2	(Germany) Gottfried von Cramm	3	6	6	6
(United Kingdom) Jack Lysaght	6	1	2	0
LL	(United Kingdom) Raymond Fontes	2	1	1
(United Kingdom) Raymond Tuckey	6	6	6
(Netherlands) Tod Hughan	4	4	2
(United Kingdom) Herman David	6	6	6
(Japan) Jiro Yamagishi	6	6	6
Q	(United Kingdom) Edward Hansom	0	0	0
(United Kingdom) Frank Wilde	6	5	6	0	7
(France) Yvon Petra	3	7	4	6	5
(United Kingdom) Bob Mulliken	3	2	3
(Republic of China (1912–1949)) Kho Sin-Kie	6	6	6
(France) Jacques Jamain	4	7	3	3
(United States) Gene Mako	6	5	6	6
(Belgium) Léopold de Borman	6	4	1
(Switzerland) Hector Fisher	8	6	6

Second round
2	(Germany) G von Cramm	6	6	6
(United Kingdom) R Tuckey	2	0	4
(United Kingdom) H David	1	4	3
(Japan) J Yamagishi	6	6	6
(United Kingdom) F Wilde	4	6	2	6	3
(Republic of China (1912–1949)) S-K Kho	6	4	6	3	6
(United States) G Mako	6	6	6
(Switzerland) H Fisher	1	2	1

Third round
2	(Germany) G von Cramm	6	6	3	6
(Japan) J Yamagishi	4	4	6	4
(Republic of China (1912–1949)) S-K Kho	6	1	2	4
(United States) G Mako	3	6	6	6

Fourth round
2	(Germany) G von Cramm	6	6	6
(United States) G Mako	0	2	3

==== Section 2 ====
First round
6	(Czechoslovakia) Roderich Menzel	4	9	6	3	4
(Australia) Jack Crawford	6	7	4	6	6
(New Zealand) Buster Andrews	6	6	6
(Norway) Fritz Jenssen	1	2	1
(United States) Hal Surface	6	6	6
(Sweden) Stig Mårtensson	0	2	1
(Kingdom of Yugoslavia) Franjo Kukuljević	6	6	6
(United Kingdom) Harold Hare	2	2	2
(United Kingdom) Laurie Shaffi	6	6	12
(United States) Lawrence Hall	3	4	10
(United Kingdom) Arnold England	8	3	3
Q	(United Kingdom) Derek Bull	10	6	6
(Belgium) Jack Van den Eynde	4	6	6	6
(Republic of Ireland) Henry Purcell	6	3	4	2
(Italy) Giorgio de Stefani	1	6	5	4
(South Africa) Colin Eedes	6	2	7	6

Second round
(Australia) J Crawford	6	8	6
(New Zealand) E Andrews	4	6	1
(United States) H Surface	7	3	6	3	7
(Kingdom of Yugoslavia) F Kukuljević	5	6	2	6	9
(United Kingdom) L Shaffi	6	6	8	6
Q	(United Kingdom) D Bull	4	4	10	3
(Belgium) J Van den Eynde	7	6	6
(South Africa) C Eedes	5	4	3

Third round
(Australia) J Crawford	6	6	10
(Kingdom of Yugoslavia) F Kukuljević	3	2	8
(United Kingdom) L Shaffi	2	6	7	6
(Belgium) J Van den Eynde	6	2	5	4

Fourth round
(Australia) J Crawford	6	6	8
(United Kingdom) L Shaffi	4	3	6

==== Section 3 ====
First round
4	(United Kingdom) Bunny Austin	3	8	6	6
(Republic of Ireland) George Lyttleton-Rogers	6	6	1	2
(United States) Wayne Sabin	6	6	6
(United Kingdom) Dickie Ritchie	4	3	4
(Australia) John Bromwich	6	10	6
(United Kingdom) John Comery	3	8	1
(Greece) Georgios Nikolaides	0	9	5
(South Africa) Vernon Kirby	6	11	7
(United Kingdom) Gerry France	6	6	6
LL	(United Kingdom) JR Fawcus	4	1	4
Q	(United Kingdom) Maurice Lucking	5	3	3
(United Kingdom) Harry Lee	7	6	6
(Australia) Alan Coldham	6	6	6	6
LL	(United Kingdom) HFC Horne	8	4	3	3
(Belgium) André Lacroix	6	7	6
Q	(United Kingdom) Jimmy Reddall	2	5	3

Second round
4	(United Kingdom) H Austin	6	6	6
(United States) W Sabin	2	3	0
(Australia) J Bromwich	7	2	6	6
(South Africa) V Kirby	5	6	4	3
(United Kingdom) G France	3	2	3
(United Kingdom) H Lee	6	6	6
(Australia) A Coldham	2	5	4
(Belgium) A Lacroix	6	7	6

Third round
4	(United Kingdom) H Austin	6	4	6	8
(Australia) J Bromwich	2	6	0	6
(United Kingdom) H Lee	6	4	2	4
(Belgium) A Lacroix	4	6	6	6

Fourth round
4	(United Kingdom) H Austin	6	7	6
(Belgium) A Lacroix	4	5	2

==== Section 4 ====
First round
5	(United States) Bryan Grant	6	6	7
Q	(United Kingdom) Jimmy Hunt	3	4	5
(United Kingdom) Roland Morton	6	6	6
LL	(United Kingdom) Harry Rothwell	3	2	4
(United Kingdom) Dennis Cook	2	5	2
(United Kingdom) Norman Taylor	6	7	6
(United Kingdom) Ted Avory	3	6	6	7
(United Kingdom) John Collins	6	4	2	5
(United Kingdom) Richard Turnbull	4	1	2
(France) Marcel Bernard	6	6	6
(United Kingdom) Donald MacPhail	6	6	6
(Monaco) Vladimir Landau	4	1	1
(New Zealand) Alan Stedman	6	6	6
(United Kingdom) Alan Brown	1	3	3
(United Kingdom) Pat Sherwood	8	3	3	5
(United Kingdom) Nigel Sharpe	6	6	6	7

Second round
5	(United States) B Grant	6	3	6	6
(United Kingdom) R Morton	2	6	3	0
(United Kingdom) N Taylor	3	6	4	7	5
(United Kingdom) E Avory	6	4	6	5	7
(France) M Bernard	3	6	0	6	6
(United Kingdom) D MacPhail	6	2	6	1	4
(New Zealand) A Stedman	6	6	0
(United Kingdom) N Sharpe	4	4	0^{r}

Third round
5	(United States) B Grant	6	6	2	6
(United Kingdom) E Avory	3	4	6	2
(France) M Bernard	4	2	3
(New Zealand) A Stedman	6	6	6

Fourth round
5	(United States) B Grant	6	6	6	6	6
(New Zealand) A Stedman	4	8	1	4

=== Bottom half ===
==== Section 5 ====
First round
Q	(United Kingdom) Malcolm Young	4	3	3
(United Kingdom) Guy Cooper	6	6	6
(No citizenship) Daniel Prenn	7	6	6
(United States) Bill Robertson	5	1	2
(Belgium) Pierre Geelhand de Merxem	6	6	6
(United Kingdom) Henry Weatherall	4	1	0
(United Kingdom) George Godsell	6	6	6
(Australia) Ronnie Boone	3	2	2
(United Kingdom) Murray Deloford	11	6	6	4	7
(United Kingdom) Gwyn Tuckett	13	0	3	6	5
(United Kingdom) John Anderson	10	6	0	2
Q	(United Kingdom) Hugh Mackinnon	12	1	6	6
(Australia) Leonard King	5	1	4
(France) Jacques Brugnon	7	6	6
(Republic of China (1912–1949)) Ho Jin	1	1	3
8	(United States) Frank Parker	6	6	6

Second round
(United Kingdom) G Cooper	1	2	4
(No citizenship) D Prenn	6	6	6
(Belgium) P Geelhand de Merxem	7	3	4	2
(United Kingdom) G Godsell	5	6	6	6
(United Kingdom) M Deloford	6	3	6	5	6
Q	(United Kingdom) H Mackinnon	2	6	2	7	3
(France) J Brugnon	0	3	1
8	(United States) F Parker	6	6	6

Third round
(No citizenship) D Prenn	6	6	6
(United Kingdom) G Godsell	4	1	2
(United Kingdom) M Deloford	0	1	7	6
8	(United States) F Parker	6	6	5	8

Fourth round
(No citizenship) D Prenn	4	5	2
8	(United States) F Parker	6	7	6

==== Section 6 ====
First round
(Austria) Georg von Metaxa	0	6	6	0	3
(United Kingdom) Charles Hare	6	4	3	6	6
(United Kingdom) Laddie Wheatcroft	0	3	6	3
(United Kingdom) Henry Billington	6	6	1	6
(United Kingdom) Brian Sturgeon	6	3	4	2
(Australia) Cliff Sproule	2	6	6	6
Q	(United Kingdom) Stan Clark	6	1	4	2
LL	(South Africa) Eustace Fannin	2	6	6	6
(Switzerland) Boris Maneff	3	3	2
(Kingdom of Yugoslavia) Franjo Punčec	6	6	6
(Sweden) Karl Schröder	6	6	6
Q	(United Kingdom) Edwin Barlow	2	0	3
(France) Georges Zarifi	3	6	4	5
(United Kingdom) Bob Tinkler	6	2	6	7
(United Kingdom) Leslie Newman	1	0	3
3	(Germany) Henner Henkel	6	6	6

Second round
(United Kingdom) C Hare	2	6	7	6
(United Kingdom) H Billington	6	2	5	4
(Australia) C Sproule	5	6	6	6	0
LL	(South Africa) E Fannin	7	3	1	8	6
(Kingdom of Yugoslavia) F Punčec	10	6	6
(Sweden) K Schröder	8	2	3
(United Kingdom) R Tinkler	6	5	6	0	3
3	(Germany) H Henkel	2	7	3	6	6

Third round
(United Kingdom) C Hare	6	6	10
LL	(South Africa) E Fannin	0	1	8
(Kingdom of Yugoslavia) F Punčec	2	2	1
3	(Germany) H Henkel	6	6	6

Fourth round
(United Kingdom) C Hare	4	6	6	2	3
3	(Germany) H Henkel	6	3	3	6	6

==== Section 7 ====
First round
Q	(United Kingdom) Bert Whitney	5	4	0
(Republic of China (1912–1949)) Choy Wai-Chuen	7	6	6
(United Kingdom) Ronnie Shayes	1	6	6	6
(Republic of Ireland) George McVeagh	6	3	1	4
(United Kingdom) Jack Harrison	4	4	9
(Italy) Ferruccio Quintavalle	6	6	11
(United States) Charles Harris	6	2	2	6	4
(Japan) Fumiteru Nakano	3	6	6	2	6
(United Kingdom) Edmund David	7	6	4	4	10
(United Kingdom) Ian Collins	5	3	6	6	8
(Kingdom of Yugoslavia) Josip Palada	2	2	6	6	6
(United Kingdom) John Olliff	6	6	4	0	2
(United Kingdom) Paul Partridge	1	2	8
(New Zealand) Dennis Coombe	6	6	10
(Switzerland) Max Ellmer	6	4	4	7
7	(Australia) Vivian McGrath	0	6	6	9

Second round
(Republic of China (1912–1949)) W-C Choy	3	6	7	5	1
(United Kingdom) R Shayes	6	1	5	7	6
(Italy) F Quintavalle	1	3	6	4
(Japan) F Nakano	6	6	4	6
(United Kingdom) E David	1	1	5
(Kingdom of Yugoslavia) J Palada	6	6	7
(New Zealand) D Coombe	3	3	7	2
7	(Australia) V McGrath	6	6	5	6

Third round
(United Kingdom) R Shayes	6	10	6	6
(Japan) F Nakano	8	8	3	1
(Kingdom of Yugoslavia) J Palada	6	3	5	2
7	(Australia) V McGrath	4	6	7	6

Fourth round
(United Kingdom) R Shayes	2	1	3
7	(Australia) V McGrath	6	6	6

==== Section 8 ====
First round
(Czechoslovakia) Ladislav Hecht	6	6	7
(United Kingdom) Eric Filby	4	1	5
(Denmark) Helge Plougmann	2	2	6	3
(United Kingdom) Claude Lister	6	6	4	6
(United Kingdom) Don Butler	6	5	6	6
(United Kingdom) Eric Peters	3	7	2	2
(United Kingdom) Henry Burrows	3	4	4
(United Kingdom) Jimmy Jones	6	6	6
(United Kingdom) Colin Ritchie	1	2	7	3
(France) Christian Boussus	6	6	5	6
(United Kingdom) Bobby Meredith	4	2	2
(Netherlands) Hans van Swol	6	6	6
(United Kingdom) Cecil Betts	0	2	6
(United Kingdom) Pat Hughes	6	6	8
(South Africa) Norman Farquharson	3	2	1
1	(United States) Don Budge	6	6	6

Second round
(Czechoslovakia) L Hecht	6	6	9
(United Kingdom) C Lister	1	0	7
(United Kingdom) D Butler	3	6	3	3
(United Kingdom) C Jones	6	4	6	6
(France) C Boussus	6	6	6
(Netherlands) A van Swol	2	1	2
(United Kingdom) P Hughes	2	2	2
1	(United States) D Budge	6	6	6

Third round
(Czechoslovakia) L Hecht	8	6	6
(United Kingdom) C Jones	6	4	3
(France) C Boussus	1	4	2
1	(United States) D Budge	6	6	6

Fourth round
(Czechoslovakia) L Hecht	4	2	2
1	(United States) D Budge	6	6	6

Preceded by 1937 French Championships	Grand Slams; Men's Singles	Succeeded by 1937 U.S. Championships
