= Stig Mårtensson (tennis) =

Swedish tennis player (1913–1995)

- Country (sports): Sweden
- Born: 8 April 1913 Stockholm, Sweden
- Died: 17 November 1995 (aged 82) Åkersberga, Stockholm, Sweden
- Turned pro: 1937(amateur tour)
- Retired: 1948
- Plays: Right–handed

Singles
- Career titles: 1

Grand Slam singles results
- Wimbledon: 1R (1937)

Grand Slam doubles results
- Wimbledon: 1R (1937)

Stig Mårtensson (8 April 1913 – 17 November 1995) was a Swedish tennis player.

== Tennis career ==
Mårtensson represented Sweden in one Davis Cup tie, the 1937 Europe Zone quarterfinal tie against Belgium played at the Royal Léopold Club in Brussels. Mårtensson and Kalle Schröder played the singles rubbers, with Mårtensson losing his first match against Charles Naeyaert and thereafter also his second match against André Lacroix.

Mårtensson played at the 1937 Wimbledon Championships, losing in the first round of both the singles and doubles events. In 1943 he won the singles title at the Swedish National Outdoor Championships and in 1948 he won the singles title at the tournament in Bude, beating David Warwick, 4–6, 6–2, 6–4 in the final.

== See also ==
- List of Sweden Davis Cup team representatives
