= Stig Mårtensson =

Stig Mårtensson may refer to:

- Stig Mårtensson (cyclist)
- Stig Mårtensson (tennis)
