= Sigurd Karlborg =

Swedish tennis player

- Country (sports): Sweden
- Born: 23 June 1909 Linköping, Sweden
- Turned pro: 1936 (amateur tour)
- Retired: 1952
- Plays: Right–handed

Sigurd Karlborg (born 23 June 1909) was a Swedish tennis player.

== Tennis career ==
Karlborg won the Swedish national outdoor championship in 1936. In 1937 het represented Sweden in one Davis Cup tie, the Europe Zone second round tie against Greece. Karlborg and Kalle Schröder played the singles rubbers, with Karlborg losing his first match against Georgios Nikolaides and thereafter also his second match against Lazaros Stalios.

== See also ==
- List of Sweden Davis Cup team representatives
