= Alan Coldham =

Australian tennis player

- Full name: Harold Alan Ernest "Tiny" Coldham
- Country (sports): Australia
- Born: 28 July 1906 Ballarat, Victoria, Australia
- Died: 1 December 1996 (aged 90) London, United Kingdom
- Turned pro: 1925 (amateur tour)
- Retired: 1948

Singles

Grand Slam singles results
- Australian Open: QF (1927)
- Wimbledon: 2R (1936, 1937, 1939, 1946, 1948)

Doubles

Grand Slam doubles results
- Australian Open: QF (1930)
- Wimbledon: 2R (1937, 1946, 1947)

Grand Slam mixed doubles results
- Wimbledon: 3R (1949)

Alan Coldham (1906–1996) was an Australian tennis player who later settled in England. He also played golf.

Coldham was national junior tennis champion of Australia in 1924 and 1925. He first entered the Australasian championships in 1925, when he lost in round one to Rice Gemmell. In 1926 he lost early to Pat O'Hara Wood, but gained his revenge on O'Hara Wood the following year by beating the twice former champion. It was a match that contained many good rallies. Coldham went for his shots and often came to the net to finish off points and ran O'Hara Wood all over the court. Coldham lost in the quarter-finals to Jack Hawkes. In 1930 Coldham beat Hawkes (who hadn't played much before the event and was out of condition) but lost in round three to Jack Clemenger.

In the 1930s, Coldham settled in England. Coldham made his debut at Wimbledon in 1936, losing in round two to Josef Caska. In 1937 he lost in round two to Andre Lacroix and in 1938 he lost in round one to Owen Anderson. In 1939 he lost in the Wimbledon second round to Alejo Russell. He lost in round two in 1946 and round one in 1947. He made his last appearance in 1948, losing in round two to Cyril Kemp.
