= 1937 International Lawn Tennis Challenge =

1937 edition of the International Lawn Tennis Challenge

Details
- Duration: 29 April – 27 July 1937
- Edition: 32nd
- Teams: 25

Champion
- Winning nation: United States

The 1937 International Lawn Tennis Challenge was the 32nd edition of what is now known as the Davis Cup. 20 teams entered the Europe Zone, while 4 teams entered the Americas Zone.

The United States defeated Australia in the Americas Zone final, while in the Europe Zone final Germany defeated Czechoslovakia. The United States defeated Germany in the Inter-Zonal play-off, and then defeated Great Britain in the Challenge Round. The final was played at the All England Club Centre Court in Wimbledon, London, England on 24–27 July.

== America Zone ==
=== Draw ===
Semifinals; 30 April–2 May
Mexico City, Mexico (clay)
Australia	5
Mexico	0
San Francisco, CA, United States (clay)
United States	5
Japan	0

Final; 29–31 May
Forest Hills, NY, United States (grass)
Australia	0
United States	5

=== Final ===
United States vs. Australia

United States
5
West Side Tennis Club, Forest Hills, NY, United States
29–31 May 1937
Grass

Australia
0

			1	2	3	4	5
1	(United States) (Australia)	Don Budge; Jack Crawford	6; 1	6; 3	6; 2
2	(United States) (Australia)	Bryan Grant; John Bromwich	6; 2	7; 5	6; 1
3	(United States) (Australia)	Don Budge / Gene Mako; Jack Crawford / Vivian McGrath	7; 5	6; 1	8; 6
4	(United States) (Australia)	Don Budge; John Bromwich	6; 2	6; 3	5; 7	6; 1
5	(United States) (Australia)	Bryan Grant; Jack Crawford	6; 0	6; 2	7; 5

== Europe Zone ==
=== Draw ===
First Round; 29 April–2 May
Germany
bye
Austria
bye
Italy
bye
Monaco
bye
Sweden
bye
Greece
bye
Belgium	3
Hungary	2
Switzerland	3
Ireland	2
Netherlands	0
South Africa	5
New Zealand	3
Taiwan	2
bye
Yugoslavia
bye
Romania
bye
Poland
bye
Czechoslovakia
bye
France
bye
Norway

Second Round; 8–17 May
Munich, Germany
Germany	3
Austria	1
Bologna, Italy (clay)
Italy	5
Monaco	0
Stockholm, Sweden (clay)
Sweden	3
Greece	2
Brussels, Belgium
Belgium	4
Switzerland	1
Brighton, England (clay)
South Africa	4
New Zealand	1
Belgrade, Yugoslavia
Yugoslavia	5
Romania	0
Warsaw, Poland
Poland	0
Czechoslovakia	5
Paris, France (clay)
France	5
Norway	0

Quarterfinals; 4–7 June
Milan, Italy (clay)
Germany	4
Italy	1
Brussels, Belgium (clay)
Sweden	2
Belgium	3
Zagreb, Yugoslavia
South Africa	1
Yugoslavia	4
Prague, Czechoslovakia (clay)
Czechoslovakia	4
France	1

Semifinals; 12–14 June
Berlin, Germany
Germany	4
Belgium	1
Prague, Czechoslovakia
Yugoslavia	1
Czechoslovakia	4

Final; 10–12 July
Berlin, Germany
Germany	4
Czechoslovakia	1

=== Final ===
Germany vs. Czechoslovakia

Germany
4
Berlin, Germany
10–12 July 1937

Czechoslovakia
1

			1	2	3	4	5
1	(Germany) (Czechoslovakia)	Henner Henkel; Ladislav Hecht	6; 1	7; 5	7; 5
2	(Germany) (Czechoslovakia)	Gottfried von Cramm; Roderich Menzel	3; 6	4; 6	6; 4	6; 3	6; 2
3	(Germany) (Czechoslovakia)	Gottfried von Cramm / Henner Henkel; Josef Caska / Ladislav Hecht	6; 1	6; 2	10; 12	6; 0
4	(Germany) (Czechoslovakia)	Gottfried von Cramm; Ladislav Hecht	6; 3	7; 5	6; 2
5	(Germany) (Czechoslovakia)	Hans Denker; František Cejnar	6; 4	6; 3	4; 6	4; 6	2; 6

== Inter-Zonal Final ==
United States vs. Germany

United States
3
Centre Court, All England Club, Wimbledon, England
17–20 July 1937
Grass

Germany
2

			1	2	3	4	5
1	(United States) (Germany)	Bryan Grant; Gottfried von Cramm	3; 6	4; 6	2; 6
2	(United States) (Germany)	Don Budge; Henner Henkel	6; 2	6; 1	6; 3
3	(United States) (Germany)	Don Budge / Gene Mako; Gottfried von Cramm / Henner Henkel	4; 6	7; 5	8; 6	6; 4
4	(United States) (Germany)	Bryan Grant; Henner Henkel	5; 7	6; 2	3; 6	4; 6
5	(United States) (Germany)	Don Budge; Gottfried von Cramm	6; 8	5; 7	6; 4	6; 2	8; 6

== Challenge Round ==
Great Britain vs. United States

Great Britain
1
Centre Court, All England Club, Wimbledon, England
24–27 July 1937
Grass

United States
4

			1	2	3	4	5
1	(United Kingdom) (United States)	Bunny Austin; Frank Parker	6; 3	6; 2	7; 5
2	(United Kingdom) (United States)	Charles Hare; Don Budge	13; 15	1; 6	2; 6
3	(United Kingdom) (United States)	Raymond Tuckey / Frank Wilde; Don Budge / Gene Mako	3; 6	5; 7	9; 7	10; 12
4	(United Kingdom) (United States)	Charles Hare; Frank Parker	2; 6	4; 6	2; 6
5	(United Kingdom) (United States)	Bunny Austin; Don Budge	6; 8	6; 3	4; 6	3; 6

== See also ==
- 1937 Wightman Cup
