= 1937 Wimbledon Championships – Women's doubles =

Women's doubles
- 1937 Wimbledon Championships

Final
- Champions: (France) Simonne Mathieu (United Kingdom) Billie Yorke
- Runners-up: (United Kingdom) Phyllis King (United Kingdom) Elsie Pittman
- Score: 6–3, 6–3

Details
- Draw: 48 (5 Q )
- Seeds: 4

Events
Singles	men	women		boys	girls
Doubles	men	women	mixed	boys	girls
← 1936 ·	Wimbledon Championships	· 1938 →

Freda James and Kay Stammers were the defending champions, but lost in the quarterfinals to Phyllis King and Elsie Pittman.

Simonne Mathieu and Billie Yorke defeated King and Pittman in the final, 6–3, 6–3 to win the ladies' doubles tennis title at the 1936 Wimbledon Championships.

== Seeds ==
1. (United Kingdom) Freda James / (United Kingdom) Kay Stammers (quarterfinals)
2. (France) Simonne Mathieu / (United Kingdom) Billie Yorke (champions)
3. (United States) Helen Jacobs / (Denmark) Hilde Sperling (third round)
4. (United Kingdom) Evelyn Dearman / (United Kingdom) Joan Ingram (semifinals)

Click on the seed number of a player to go to their draw section.

== Draw ==
=== Key ===
- Q = Qualifier
- WC = Wild card
- LL = Lucky loser
- Alt = Alternate
- SE = Special exempt
- PR = Protected ranking
- ITF = ITF entry
- JE = Junior exempt
- w/o = Walkover
- r = Retired
- d = Defaulted
- SR = Special ranking

=== Finals ===
Quarterfinals
2	(France) Simonne Mathieu (United Kingdom) Billie Yorke	3	6	8
(Poland) Jadwiga Jędrzejowska (United Kingdom) Susan Noel	6	2	6
4	(United Kingdom) Evelyn Dearman (United Kingdom) Joan Ingram	9	7
(United Kingdom) Mary Heeley (United Kingdom) Dorothy Round	7	5
(United Kingdom) Alex McOstrich (United Kingdom) Jean Saunders	2	5
(United States) Dorothy Andrus (France) Sylvie Henrotin	6	7
(United Kingdom) Phyllis King (United Kingdom) Elsie Pittman	6	7
1	(United Kingdom) Freda James (United Kingdom) Kay Stammers	1	5

Semifinals
2	(France) Simonne Mathieu (United Kingdom) Billie Yorke	7	6
4	(United Kingdom) Evelyn Dearman (United Kingdom) Joan Ingram	5	3
(United States) Dorothy Andrus (France) Sylvie Henrotin	3	4
(United Kingdom) Phyllis King (United Kingdom) Elsie Pittman	6	6

Final
2	(France) Simonne Mathieu (United Kingdom) Billie Yorke	6	6
(United Kingdom) Phyllis King (United Kingdom) Elsie Pittman	3	3

=== Top half ===
==== Section 1 ====
First round

Second round
2	(France) Simonne Mathieu (United Kingdom) Billie Yorke	6	6
(United States) Alice Marble (United States) Katherine Winthrop	2	4
(Austria) Rosl Kraus (United Kingdom) Dorothy Shepherd-Barron	3	2
(United Kingdom) Helen Burr (United Kingdom) Yvonne Law	6	6
(Poland) Jadwiga Jędrzejowska (United Kingdom) Susan Noel	6	6
(United Kingdom) Betty Hobson (United Kingdom) Audrey Wright	3	4
(United Kingdom) Thelma Jarvis (United Kingdom) Gladys Southwell	3	4
(United Kingdom) Vere King (United Kingdom) Penny Weekes	6	6

Third round
2	(France) S Mathieu (United Kingdom) A Yorke	3	6	6
(United Kingdom) H Burr (United Kingdom) Y Law	6	3	3
(Poland) J Jędrzejowska (United Kingdom) S Noel	6	8
(United Kingdom) V King (United Kingdom) P Weekes	3	6

Quarterfinals
2	(France) S Mathieu (United Kingdom) A Yorke	3	6	8
(Poland) J Jędrzejowska (United Kingdom) S Noel	6	2	6

==== Section 2 ====
First round
4	(United Kingdom) Evelyn Dearman (United Kingdom) Joan Ingram	6	6
(United Kingdom) Lucy Pennycuick (United Kingdom) Mie Trentham	2	4
(United Kingdom) Margot Stewart (United Kingdom) Patience Thomson	3	3
(United Kingdom) Mildred Freeman (United Kingdom) Gladys Southam	6	6
(United Kingdom) Nancy Fontes (United Kingdom) Rosemary Smith	2	4
(United Kingdom) Cecily Marriott (United Kingdom) Madge Slaney	6	6
(United Kingdom) Nancy Lyle (United Kingdom) Betty Nuthall	6	6
E Homan (United Kingdom) Olga MacInnes	0	3
(United Kingdom) Joan Marquis (United Kingdom) Mona Riddell	0	4
(France) Colette Boegner (France) Lilí de la Valdène	6	6
Q	(United Kingdom) Muriel Bray (United Kingdom) Audrey Cardinall	9	5	2
(Denmark) Else Hollis (Netherlands) Truid Terwindt	7	7	6
(United Kingdom) Patsy O'Connell (United Kingdom) Effie Peters	6	2	5
(United Kingdom) Bernice Lumb (United Kingdom) Margot Lumb	1	6	7
(United Kingdom) Gaby Curtis (United Kingdom) Nancy Dickin	1	4
(United Kingdom) Mary Heeley (United Kingdom) Dorothy Round	6	6

Second round
4	(United Kingdom) E Dearman (United Kingdom) J Ingram	6	6
(United Kingdom) M Freeman (United Kingdom) G Southam	3	2
(United Kingdom) C Marriott (United Kingdom) M Slaney	2	2
(United Kingdom) N Lyle (United Kingdom) B Nuthall	6	6
(France) C Boegner (France) E de la Valdène	6	6
(Denmark) E Hollis (Netherlands) G Terwindt	2	2
(United Kingdom) B Lumb (United Kingdom) M Lumb	1	1
(United Kingdom) M Heeley (United Kingdom) D Round	6	6

Third round
4	(United Kingdom) E Dearman (United Kingdom) J Ingram	6	4	7
(United Kingdom) N Lyle (United Kingdom) B Nuthall	0	6	5
(France) C Boegner (France) E de la Valdène	7	1	5
(United Kingdom) M Heeley (United Kingdom) D Round	5	6	7

Quarterfinals
4	(United Kingdom) E Dearman (United Kingdom) J Ingram	9	7
(United Kingdom) M Heeley (United Kingdom) D Round	7	5

The nationality of Miss E Homan is unknown.

=== Bottom half ===
==== Section 3 ====
First round
(United Kingdom) Valerie Scott (United Kingdom) Mary Whitmarsh	1	4
(United Kingdom) Elsa Haylock (United Kingdom) Ruth Kirk	6	6
Q	(United Kingdom) Betty Smith (United Kingdom) Mollie Trouncer	1	6	4
(United Kingdom) Nina Brown (United Kingdom) Rita Jarvis	6	3	6
Q	(United Kingdom) FM Burton (United Kingdom) Edith Middleton	1	3
(United Kingdom) Alex McOstrich (United Kingdom) Jean Saunders	6	6
(Netherlands) Madzy Couquerque (Germany) Marie Horn	6	6
Q	(United Kingdom) Joan Goss; Mrs AL Semmence	2	2
(United Kingdom) Betty Batt (United Kingdom) Mary Bowden	6	3	3
(United Kingdom) Mrs CP Brutton (United Kingdom) Sheila Chuter	3	6	6
(Chile) Anita Lizana (United Kingdom) Peggy Scriven	2	7
(United States) Dorothy Andrus (France) Sylvie Henrotin	6	9
(Hungary) Magda Baumgarten (United Kingdom) Mrs W Merricks	6	6
Q	Mrs GA Myers; Audrey Richardson	3	2
(United Kingdom) Margaret Mellows (United Kingdom) Freda Underwood	6	2
3	(United States) Helen Jacobs (Denmark) Hilde Sperling	8	6

Second round
(United Kingdom) E Haylock (United Kingdom) R Kirk	3	6	9
(United Kingdom) N Brown (United Kingdom) R Jarvis	6	2	11
(United Kingdom) A McOstrich (United Kingdom) J Saunders	4	6	6
(Netherlands) M Couquerque (Germany) M Horn	6	1	4
(United Kingdom) Mrs CP Brutton (United Kingdom) S Chuter	0	5
(United States) D Andrus (France) S Henrotin	6	7
(Hungary) A Baumgarten (United Kingdom) Mrs W Merricks	1	7	5
3	(United States) H Jacobs (Denmark) H Sperling	6	5	7

Third round
(United Kingdom) N Brown (United Kingdom) R Jarvis	6	1	5
(United Kingdom) A McOstrich (United Kingdom) J Saunders	2	6	7
(United States) D Andrus (France) S Henrotin	7	6	6
3	(United States) H Jacobs (Denmark) H Sperling	5	8	2

Quarterfinals
(United Kingdom) A McOstrich (United Kingdom) J Saunders	2	5
(United States) D Andrus (France) S Henrotin	6	7

The nationalities of Mrs AL Semmence, Mrs GA Myers and Audrey Richardson are unknown.

==== Section 4 ====
First round

Second round
(Republic of Ireland) Josephine Harman (Republic of Ireland) Joy Myerscough	6	2	3
(United Kingdom) Joan Strawson (United Kingdom) Betty Uber	2	6	6
(United Kingdom) Phyllis King (United Kingdom) Elsie Pittman	6	6
(United Kingdom) Betty Couper (United Kingdom) Pamela Morison	1	3
(United Kingdom) Mary Hardwick (United Kingdom) Ermyntrude Harvey	6	10
(United Kingdom) Sonia Mavrogordato (United Kingdom) Madie Moss	4	8
(United Kingdom) Dora Beazley (United Kingdom) Molly Hargreaves	3	1
1	(United Kingdom) Freda James (United Kingdom) Kay Stammers	6	6

Third round
(United Kingdom) J Strawson (United Kingdom) E Uber	6	6	1
(United Kingdom) P King (United Kingdom) E Pittman	8	4	6
(United Kingdom) M Hardwick (United Kingdom) E Harvey	3	4
1	(United Kingdom) W James (United Kingdom) K Stammers	6	6

Quarterfinals
(United Kingdom) P King (United Kingdom) E Pittman	6	7
1	(United Kingdom) W James (United Kingdom) K Stammers	1	5
