= Laurie Shaffi =

British–Indian diplomat, tennis player (1912–2005)

- Country (sports): Great Britain
- Born: 15 August 1912 London, England
- Died: 6 February 2005 (aged 92) Monterey, California

Grand Slam singles results
- Wimbledon: 4R (1937)

Grand Slam doubles results
- Wimbledon: 2R (1935, 1937)

Laurie Shaffi OBE (15 August 1912 – 6 February 2005) was a British–Indian barrister, diplomat and tennis player.

Shaffi, born in London and half-Indian, was an old boy of Emanuel School.

Active on the tennis tour in the 1930s, Shaffi's career titles included the East of England Championships and Essex Championships. In 1939, he earned a call-up to the Great Britain Davis Cup team, on the back of recent wins over Donald MacPhail and Ronald Shayes, both rivals for a berth in the lineup. Unranked in Britain at the time, he was considered a surprise selection and featured in ties against both France and Germany.

During World War II, Shaffi fought with the Royal Air Force. He became Adjutant to Field Marshall Claude Auchinleck.

A law graduate, Shaffi served as Pakistan's Consul General in New York and San Francisco. He married an American and was a long-time resident of Monterey, California.

== See also ==
- List of Great Britain Davis Cup team representatives
