= Dennis Coombe =

New Zealand tennis player (1911–1979)

- Full name: Dennis Cameron Coombe
- Country (sports): New Zealand
- Born: 11 November 1911
- Died: 1979 London, England

Singles

Grand Slam singles results
- French Open: 2R (1937, 1950)
- Wimbledon: 2R (1937, 1938)

Dennis Cameron Coombe (11 November 1911–1979) was a New Zealand amateur tennis player. He also worked as a tennis broadcaster and commentated at the Wimbledon Championships alongside Fred Perry for ITV.

Born in 1911, Coombe hailed from a prominent family in the Rangitikei area.

Coombe possessed a good all–round game and was regarded as a skilled tactician. A Wellington provincial player, Coombe was the North Island singles champion in 1935 and two years later became New Zealand national champion. He played a Davis Cup singles rubber for New Zealand in 1937, losing to Eustace Fannin of South Africa, then in 1939 partnered with Cam Malfroy to defeat the British pairing of Frank Wilde and Charles Hare in a doubles rubber.

A businessman by profession, Coombe lived for many years in England and served as a local representative for the New Zealand Lawn Tennis Association. He died in London in 1979.

== See also ==
- List of New Zealand Davis Cup team representatives
