= Kalle Schröder =

Swedish tennis player (1913–1982)

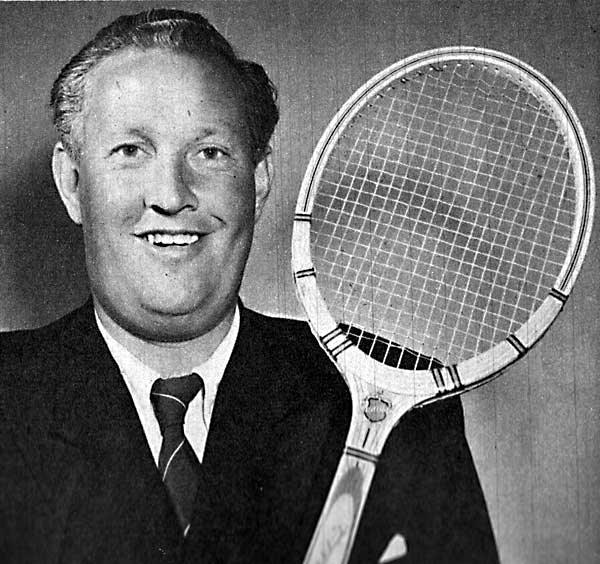
- Kalle Schröder in June 1948
- Full name: Karl Kristian Anton Schröder
- Country (sports): Sweden
- Born: 30 October 1913 Lidingö, Sweden
- Died: 9 June 1982 (aged 68) Lidingö, Sweden
- Turned pro: 1934 (amateur circuit)
- Retired: 1956

Singles
- Career titles: 16

Grand Slam singles results
- Wimbledon: 2R (1934, 1937)

Doubles

Grand Slam doubles results
- Wimbledon: 3R (1937)

Mixed doubles

Grand Slam mixed doubles results
- Wimbledon: 4R (1937)

Karl Kristian Anton 'Kalle' Schröder (30 October 1913 – 9 June 1982) was a Swedish tennis player. He was active from 1934 to 1956 and won 16 career singles titles. In major tournaments he was a two time quarter finalist at the Wembley Professional Championships in 1949 and 1950. His other notable wins were at the British Covered Court Championships in 1936, the Scandinavian Championships the same year, and the German International Covered Court Championships in 1938.

== Tennis career ==
Schröder made his debut for Sweden in the Davis Cup during 1935 against Ireland. He teamed-up with Curt Östberg to defeat the Irish, 3–2 in the second qualifying round, but the pair lost to the Netherlands in the final qualifying round. Between 1935 and 1939, Schröder played a total of 26 Davis Cup matches for Sweden and won 17 of these. His last Davis Cup tie was the 1939 Europe Zone Quarterfinals against Germany. Schröder and doubles partner, Nils Rohlsson were victories against the German pair of Henner Henkel and Georg von Metaxa, but in the singles he and Morgan Hultman lost both of their respective singles matches, giving Germany a 4–1 victory.

Schröder was the first Swedish tennis player to truly achieve international success and during the years 1934 to 1942, he won 11 European Championship titles which include the German –, French – and English indoor championships.

Schröder twice participated at the Wimbledon Championships, in 1934 and 1937, and reached the second round on both occasions. In 1941 he became a professional player and after retirement he took up coaching and worked with Lennart Bergelin, among others.

== See also ==
- List of Sweden Davis Cup team representatives
