= George Godsell =

British tennis player (1907–1953)

- Full name: George Edward Godsell
- Country (sports): United Kingdom
- Born: 26 April 1907
- Died: 1 May 1953 (aged 46) Kensington, London W8

Singles

Grand Slam singles results
- French Open: 1R (1947)
- Wimbledon: 3R (1937, 1938)
- US Open: 2R (1938)

George Edward Godsell (26 April 1907 – 1 May 1953) was a British tennis player.

Based in Gloucestershire, Godsell was active from the 1930s to early 1950s. Locally he won the singles title at Cheltenham four times and he was also a winner of the East of England Championships. He competed regularly at Wimbledon and reached the singles third round twice. Playing into his 40s, he reportedly appeared in 49 tournament finals across 1949 and 1950, believed to be the most of any male player during this time.

Godsell died at the age of 46 from carbon monoxide poisoning, having taken his own life. He was found dead at his home in West London. A neighbour revealed during an inquest that Godsell had been depressed and was suffering from a painful back injury, which had recently ended his tennis career.

His death took place at 18, Sinclair Road, Kensington, London W8, and he left an estate valued for probate at £12,000.
