= Max Ellmer =

Swiss tennis player

- Country (sports): Switzerland
- Born: 6 July 1909; Switzerland
- Died: 1 January 1984 (aged 74); Switzerland
- Turned pro: 1930 (amateur tour)
- Retired: 1954

Singles

Grand Slam singles results
- French Open: 4R (1934)
- Wimbledon: QF (1938)

Doubles

Grand Slam doubles results
- Wimbledon: 3R (1937, 1947)

Mixed doubles

Grand Slam mixed doubles results
- Wimbledon: 3R (1939)

Max Ellmer (1909 – 1984) was a Swiss tennis player in the years before and after World War 2.

Ellmer had a powerful backhand and good footwork. He played Davis Cup for Switzerland from 1933 to 1938. He won the Swiss Championships four times (1932, 1934, 1935 and 1936). He played at the French Championships and Wimbledon in a Grand Slam singles career that spanned the years 1930 to 1949. At the French Championships in 1934, Ellmer beat the 13th seed Wilmer Hines and won a set from eventual winner Gottfried von Cramm in losing in the fourth round. At Wimbledon in 1938, Ellmer beat 6th seed Dragutin Mitić in five sets before losing in straight sets to Bunny Austin in the quarter-finals. Ellmer beat former champion Jack Crawford in round one of the Wimbledon men's singles in 1947 before losing in the second round.
