= Charles Hare (tennis) =

British tennis player (1915–96)

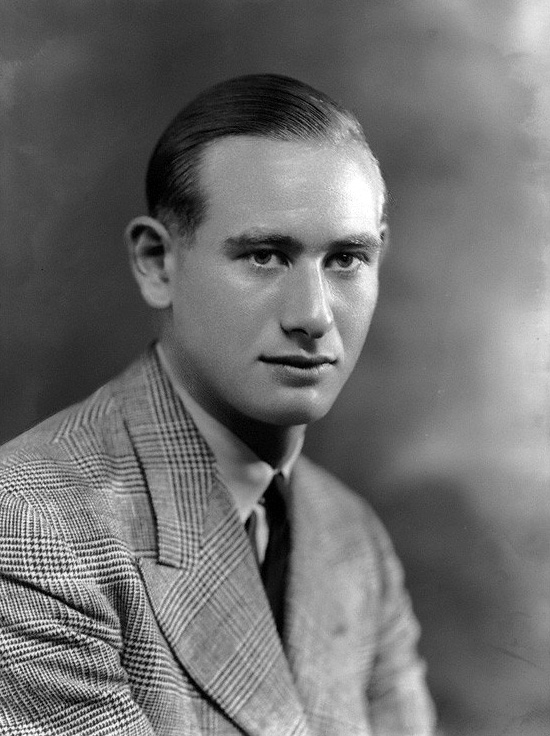
- Hare in 1936
- Full name: Charles Edgar Hare
- Country (sports): United Kingdom
- Born: 16 July 1915 Birmingham, England
- Died: 18 November 1996 (aged 81) Salisbury, England
- Turned pro: 1934 (amateur tour)
- Retired: 1955

Singles
- Highest ranking: No. 10 (1937, A. Wallis Myers)

Grand Slam singles results
- French Open: QF (1937)
- Wimbledon: 4R (1937)
- US Open: QF (1937)

Doubles

Grand Slam doubles results
- Wimbledon: F (1936, 1939)

Grand Slam mixed doubles results
- Wimbledon: 3R (1934, 1937)

Team competitions
- Davis Cup: F (1937^{Ch})

Charles Edgar Hare (16 July 1915 – 18 November 1996) was a British tennis player active in 1930s, 1940s and 1950s.

== Tennis career ==
1937 was by far Hare's most successful year, reaching the quarterfinals of the French Championships and the U.S. National Championships, the fourth round of Wimbledon and playing for Great Britain in the Challenge Round of the 1937 Davis Cup.

He was ranked World No. 10 by A. Wallis Myers of The Daily Telegraph for 1937.

In January 1943 he married tennis player Mary Hardwick in Phoenix, Arizona. Both worked for Wilson Sporting Goods.

== Grand Slam finals ==
=== Doubles (2 runner-ups) ===
Result	Year	Championship	Surface	Partner	Opponents	Score
Loss	1936	Wimbledon	Grass	(United Kingdom) Frank Wilde	(United Kingdom) Pat Hughes (United Kingdom) Raymond Tuckey	4–6, 6–3, 9–7, 1–6, 4–6
Loss	1939	Wimbledon	Grass	(United Kingdom) Frank Wilde	(United States) Elwood Cooke (United States) Bobby Riggs	3–6, 6–3, 3–6, 7–9
