= Gottfried von Cramm =

German tennis player (1909–1976)

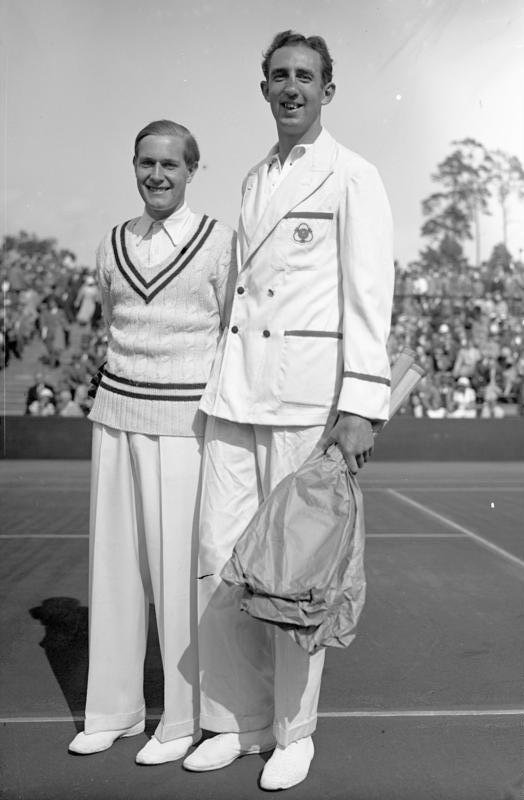
- Gottfried von Cramm (left) and George Lyttleton Rogers of Ireland in 1932
- Full name: Gottfried Alexander Maximilian Walter Kurt Freiherr von Cramm
- Country (sports): Weimar Republic (until 1933); Nazi Germany (1933–1945); West Germany (from 1949)
- Born: 7 July 1909 Nettlingen, German Empire
- Died: 8 November 1976 (aged 67) Cairo, Egypt
- Height: 1.83 m (6 ft 0 in)
- Turned pro: 1931 (amateur tour)
- Retired: 1952
- Plays: Right-handed (one-handed backhand)
- Int. Tennis HoF: 1977 (member page)

Singles
- Career record: 390–82 (82.6%)
- Career titles: 45
- Highest ranking: No. 1 (1937, ITHF)

Grand Slam singles results
- Australian Open: SF (1938)
- French Open: W (1934, 1936)
- Wimbledon: F (1935, 1936, 1937)
- US Open: F (1937)

Grand Slam doubles results
- Australian Open: F (1938)
- French Open: W (1937)
- Wimbledon: SF (1933, 1937)
- US Open: W (1937)

Grand Slam mixed doubles results
- Wimbledon: W (1933)

Gottfried Alexander Maximilian Walter Kurt Freiherr von Cramm (German: [ˈɡɔtfʁiːt fɔn ˈkʁam]; 7 July 1909 – 8 November 1976) was a German tennis player who won the French Championships twice and reached the final of a Grand Slam singles tournament on five other occasions. He was ranked number 2 in the world in 1934 and 1936, and number 1 in the world in 1937. He was the first German to win a singles title at a Grand Slam tournament. He was inducted into the International Tennis Hall of Fame in 1977, which states that he is "most remembered for a gallant effort in defeat against Don Budge in the 1937 Interzone Final at Wimbledon".

Von Cramm had difficulties with the Nazi regime, which attempted to exploit his appearance and skill as a symbol of Aryan supremacy, but he refused to identify with Nazism. He was jailed briefly in 1938 for a homosexual affair.

Von Cramm figured briefly in the gossip columns as the sixth husband of Barbara Hutton, the Woolworth heiress.

== Birth and childhood ==
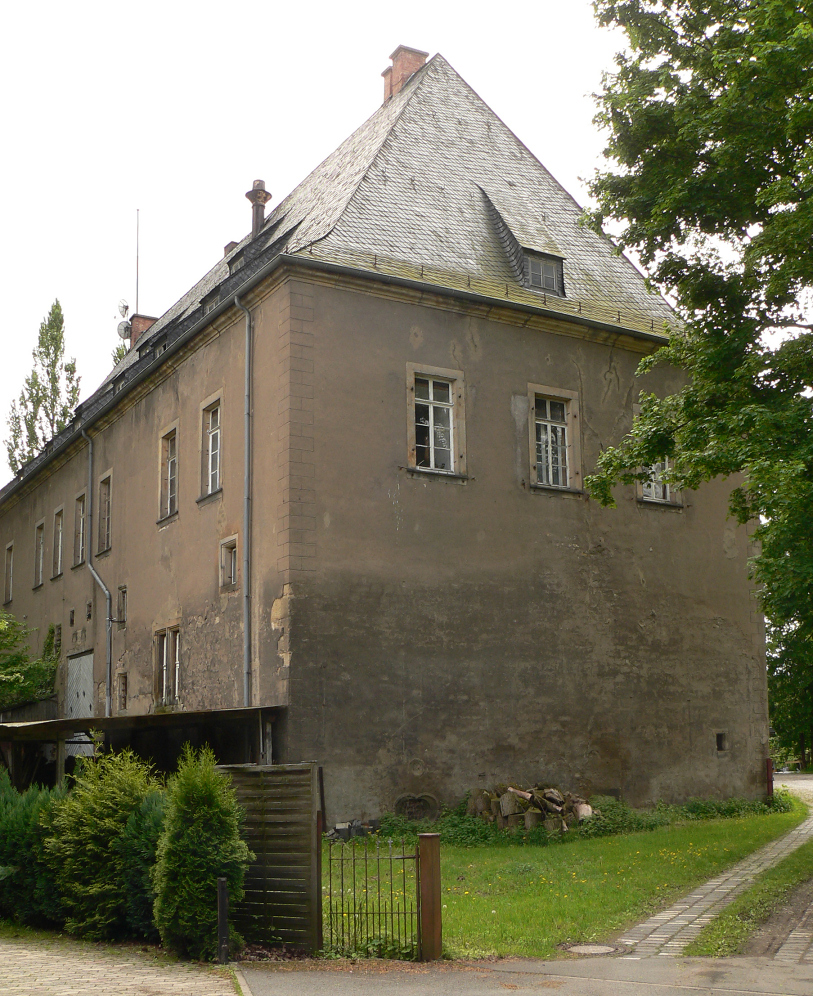
Schloss Nettlingen, where Gottfried von Cramm was born

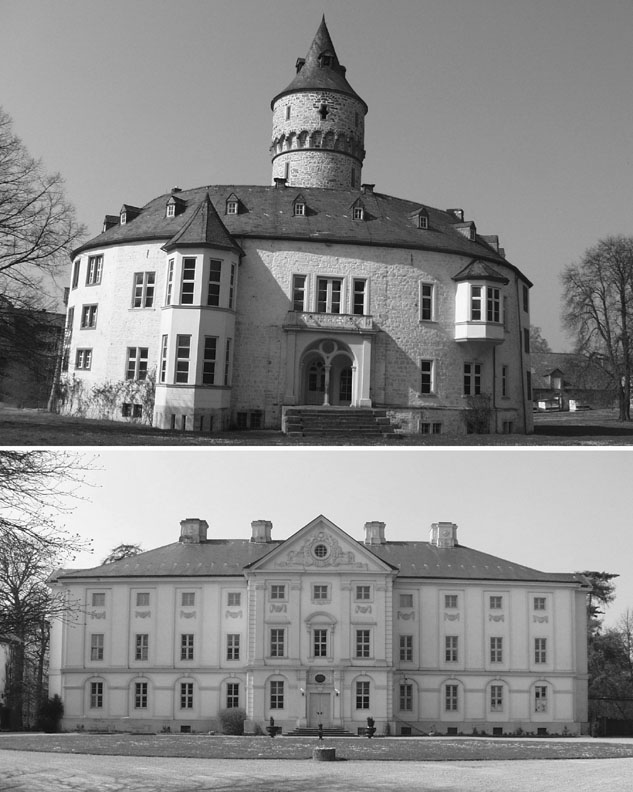
Castle Oelber, the family's summer estate, and Castle Brüggen, where Cramm grew up.

Member of an ancient German nobility, the third of the seven sons of Baron Burchard von Cramm (1874-1936), by his marriage to Countess Jutta von Steinberg (1888–1972), Cramm was born at the family estate, Schloss Nettlingen in Lower Saxony, Germany and grew up in Schloss Brüggen in Hildesheim, which his mother Jutta inherited in 1911.

A younger brother, Wilhelm-Ernst Freiherr von Cramm (1917–1996), was a German officer who was highly decorated during the Second World War, and who after the war was leader of the German Party, a conservative German political party.

Through the mutual ancestry from the House of Cramm, Gottfied was related to the Dutch royal house, in particular through Bernhard, Prince of the Netherlands who was his third cousin.

== Tennis career ==
Von Cramm began playing tennis around the age of ten after his right hand had recovered from an accident. That accident, which resulted in him losing the top joint of his index finger on his right hand, was the result of a horse who took more than just the sugar cube offered to him by the young von Cramm.

In 1932, Cramm earned a place in the German Davis Cup team and won the first of four straight German national tennis championships. During this time he also teamed up with Hilde Krahwinkel to win the 1933 mixed doubles title at Wimbledon. Noted for his gentlemanly conduct and fair play, he gained the admiration and respect of his fellow tennis players. He earned his first individual Grand Slam title in 1934, winning the French Championships at Roland Garros. He was the first non-American, British, Australian or French player to win a singles Grand Slam title. His victory made him a national hero in his native Germany; however, it was by chance that he won just after Adolf Hitler had come to power. The handsome, blond Gottfried von Cramm fitted perfectly the Aryan race image of a Nazi ideology that put pressure on all German athletes to be superior. However, Cramm steadfastly refused to be a tool for Nazi propaganda. Germany effectively lost its 1935 Davis Cup Interzone Final against the US when Cramm refused to take a match point in the deciding game, by notifying the umpire that the ball had tipped his racket, and thus calling a point against himself, although no one had witnessed the error.

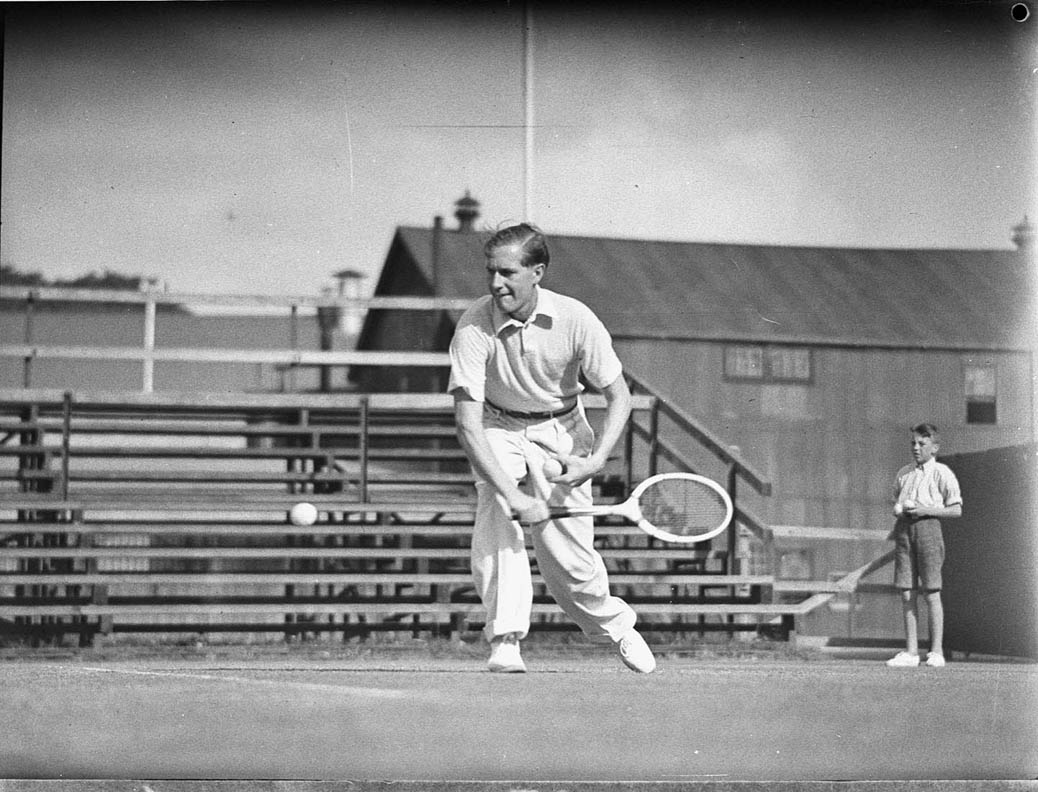
von Cramm at the 1937 Australian Championships

For three straight years Cramm was the men's singles runner-up at the Wimbledon Championships, losing in the final to England's Fred Perry in 1935 and again in 1936. The following year he was runner-up to American Don Budge, both at Wimbledon and at the U.S. National Championships. In 1935, he was beaten in the Roland Garros final by Perry, but turned the tables the following year and defeated his rival, gaining his second French championship.

In addition to his Grand Slam play, Gottfried von Cramm is recalled for his deciding match against Don Budge during the 1937 Davis Cup. He was ahead 4–1 in the final set when Budge launched a comeback, eventually winning 8–6 in a match considered by many as the greatest battle in the annals of Davis Cup play and one of the pre-eminent matches in all of tennis history. In a later interview, Budge said that Cramm had received a phone call from Hitler minutes before the match started and had come out pale and serious and had played each point as though his life depended on winning. Ted Tinling, who served as the Player Liaison for the All England Club, recalled in his memoir that as he was in the process of ushering Budge and von Cramm out to Centre Court, they were interrupted by a long-distance call for von Cramm, and that following the call, von Cramm turned to him and Budge and said, 'Excuse me, gentlemen, it was Hitler. He wanted to wish me good luck.' Others say that Budge believed a tale invented by Teddy Tinling that Hitler had telephoned Cramm before the match.

For his successful tennis career, he was decorated by the President of the Federal Republic of Germany with the Silver Laurel Leaf, Germany's highest sports award.

== Imprisonment for same-sex affair ==
Despite his enormous popularity with the public, on 5 March 1938, von Cramm was arrested by the German government and tried on the charge of a homosexual relationship with Manasse Herbst, a young Galician Jewish actor and singer, who had appeared in the 1926 silent film Der Sohn des Hannibal. After being hospitalized for a nervous collapse after his arrest, on 14 March von Cramm was sentenced to one year's imprisonment. Cramm admitted the relationship, which had lasted from 1931 until 1934 and had begun shortly before he married his first wife. He was additionally charged with sending money to Herbst, who had moved to Palestine in 1936. According to a report on the trial in The New York Times of 15 May 1938, the judge stated that "Baron von Cramm had alleged that his wife, during their honeymoon, had become intimate with a French athlete. The court held that this experience had unsettled the young tennis star and had resulted in his seeking a perverse compensation for an unhappy married life." Although Cramm had confessed to an affair with Herbst once he was arrested, he later changed his confession to one of "mutual masturbation", and his lawyer was able to convince the judge that Cramm had been forced into sending money to Herbst because Herbst was a "sneaky Jew".

Cramm's international tennis friends were outraged at his treatment. Don Budge collected the signatures of high-profile athletes and sent a protest letter to Hitler. His friend King Gustaf V of Sweden also pressured the German government to have him released. Cramm was released on parole after six months, and in May 1939 returned to competitive tennis. Cramm competed at the Queen's Club Championships in London, where he won the event by beating American Bobby Riggs 6–0, 6–1. Officials at Wimbledon reportedly refused to let him play in their tournament, using the excuse that he was a convicted criminal and therefore unfit.

== Connections to the German resistance ==
Cramm refused to become a party member of the NSDAP during the entire period of the National Socialist regime, although Hermann Göring, who was a member of the same tennis club, tried to persuade him several times. Because Cramm never mentioned Hitler during speeches on international trips, watched films critical of the regime, and privately spoke disparagingly of the National Socialists, he increasingly aroused the displeasure of the Nazis.

Von Cramm showed solidarity with the active resistance to Hitler in the last years of the war, using his travels as a tennis coach to Sweden to pass on confidential messages from the 20 July conspirators. After the failed assassination attempt, he expressed his desire to join another attempt. Since the resistance never reorganised after the 20 July plot, he never got the chance to turn his words into deeds.

== Wartime service and postwar career ==
In May 1940, some months after the outbreak of the Second World War, Cramm was conscripted into military service as a member of the Hermann Goering Division. He saw action on the Eastern Front and was awarded the Iron Cross. Despite his noble background, Cramm was enlisted as a private soldier until being given a company to command. His company faced harsh conditions on the Eastern Front, and Cramm was flown out suffering from frostbite, with much of his company dead. Because of his previous conviction, he was dismissed from military service in 1942.

While the war robbed Cramm of some of his best years as a tennis player, he won the German national championship in 1948 and again in 1949, when he was 40 years old. He went on playing Davis Cup tennis until retiring after the 1953 season and still holds the record for the most wins by any German team member.

Following his retirement from active competition, Cramm served as an administrator in the German Tennis Federation. He was instrumental in reviving the Lawn Tennis Club Rot-Weiss in Berlin following World War II, and later served as its Chairman and President (1958-death). Von Cramm became successful in business as a cotton importer. In addition, he managed the landed estate he had inherited from his father in Wispenstein, in Lower Saxony.

== Marriages ==
Gottfried von Cramm married twice:

- Baroness Elisabeth Lisa von Dobeneck (1912–1975), a daughter of Robert, Baron von Dobeneck (died in 1926) and his wife, the former Maria Hagen (1889–1943), a granddaughter of the Jewish banker Louis Hagen. They married on 1 September 1930 and divorced in 1937. Lisa von Cramm later married the German ice-hockey star Gustav Jaenecke.
- Barbara Hutton, an American socialite and an heiress to the Woolworth five-and-dime fortune. The couple married in 1955 and divorced in 1959. He had married her in order to "help her through substance abuse and depression but was unable to help her in the end."

== Death ==
While on a business trip, Cramm and his driver were killed in an automobile accident near Cairo, Egypt, in 1976, when the baron's car collided with a truck. Two roads were named in his honor, the Gottfried-von-Cramm-Weg in Berlin-Wilmersdorf, where the Rot-Weiss Tennis Club is located, and a similarly named road in the small town of Merzig.

Gottfried von Cramm was inducted into the International Tennis Hall of Fame in Newport, Rhode Island, in 1977.

In his 1979 autobiography, Jack Kramer, the long-time tennis promoter and a great player, included Gottfried von Cramm in his list of the 21 greatest players of all time.^{[B]} Cramm's life story, in particular his famous Davis Cup match against Budge, was the major focus of the 2009 book A Terrible Splendor: Three Extraordinary Men, a World Poised for War, and the Greatest Tennis Match Ever Played. Cramm was the subject of a radio play, titled Playing for His Life, first broadcast on BBC Radio 4 in June 2011. The play focused on the 1937 Interzone Davis Cup final and on Cramm's personal life. Cramm's story is featured at some length in the 2023 Netflix documentary Eldorado – everything the Nazis hate. He is also the subject of the 2024 documentary screened by PBS Playing to Survive: von Cramm vs Hitler.

== Grand Slam finals ==
=== Singles (2 titles, 5 runners-up) ===
Result	Year	Championship	Surface	Opponent	Score
Win	1934	French Championships	Clay	(Australia) Jack Crawford	6–4, 7–9, 3–6, 7–5, 6–3
Loss	1935	French Championships	Clay	(United Kingdom) Fred Perry	3–6, 6–3, 1–6, 3–6
Loss	1935	Wimbledon	Grass	(United Kingdom) Fred Perry	2–6, 4–6, 4–6
Win	1936	French Championship	Clay	(United Kingdom) Fred Perry	6–0, 2–6, 6–2, 2–6, 6–0
Loss	1936	Wimbledon	Grass	(United Kingdom) Fred Perry	1–6, 1–6, 0–6
Loss	1937	Wimbledon	Grass	(United States) Don Budge	3–6, 4–6, 2–6
Loss	1937	U.S. Championships	Grass	(United States) Don Budge	1–6, 9–7, 1–6, 6–3, 1–6

=== Doubles (2 titles, 1 runner-up) ===
Result	Year	Championship	Surface	Partner	Opponents	Score
Win	1937	French Championships	Clay	(Germany) Henner Henkel	(South Africa) Vernon Kirby (South Africa) Norman Farquharson	6–4, 7–5, 3–6, 6–1
Win	1937	U.S. Championships	Grass	(Germany) Henner Henkel	(United States) Don Budge (United States) Gene Mako	6–4, 7–5, 6–4
Loss	1938	Australian Championships	Grass	(Germany) Henner Henkel	(Australia) John Bromwich (Australia) Adrian Quist	5–7, 4–6, 0–6

=== Mixed doubles (1 title) ===
Result	Year	Championship	Surface	Partner	Opponents	Score
Win	1933	Wimbledon	Grass	(Germany) Hilde Krahwinkel	(United Kingdom) Mary Heeley (South Africa) Norman Farquharson	7–5, 8–6

== Grand Slam singles performance timeline ==
Key
W	F	SF	QF	#R	RR	Q#	DNQ	A	NH

(W) winner; (F) finalist; (SF) semifinalist; (QF) quarterfinalist; (#R) rounds 4, 3, 2, 1; (RR) round-robin stage; (Q#) qualification round; (DNQ) did not qualify; (A) absent; (NH) not held; (SR) strike rate (events won / competed); (W–L) win–loss record.

Tournament	1931	1932	1933	1934	1935	1936	1937	1938	1939	1940	1941	1942	1943	1944	1945	1946	1947	1948	1949	1950	1951	1952	SR	W–L	Win %
Australia	A	A	A	A	A	A	A	SF	A	A	NH	NH	NH	NH	NH	A	A	A	A	A	A	A	0 / 1	3–1	75.0
France	4R	2R	A	W	F	W	A	A	A	NH	NH	NH	NH	NH	NH	A	A	A	A	A	A	1R	2 / 6	21–4	84.0
Wimbledon	4R	2R	3R	4R	F	F	F	A	A	NH	NH	NH	NH	NH	NH	A	A	A	A	A	1R	A	0 / 8	27–8	77.1
United States	A	A	A	A	A	A	F	A	A	A	A	A	A	A	A	A	A	A	A	A	A	A	0 / 1	5–1	83.3

Source: ITF

== Notes ==
^{B} Writing in 1979, Kramer considered the best ever to have been either Don Budge (for consistent play) or Ellsworth Vines (at the height of his game). The next four best were, chronologically, Bill Tilden, Fred Perry, Bobby Riggs and Pancho Gonzales. After these six came the "second echelon" of Rod Laver, Lew Hoad, Ken Rosewall, Gottfried von Cramm, Ted Schroeder, Jack Crawford, Pancho Segura, Frank Sedgman, Tony Trabert, John Newcombe, Arthur Ashe, Stan Smith, Björn Borg and Jimmy Connors. He felt unable to rank Henri Cochet and René Lacoste accurately but felt they were among the very best.

Awards
Preceded by Incumbent	German Sportsman of the Year; 1947–1948	Succeeded by (Germany) Georg Meier
