= André Lacroix (tennis) =

Belgian tennis player (1908–1992)

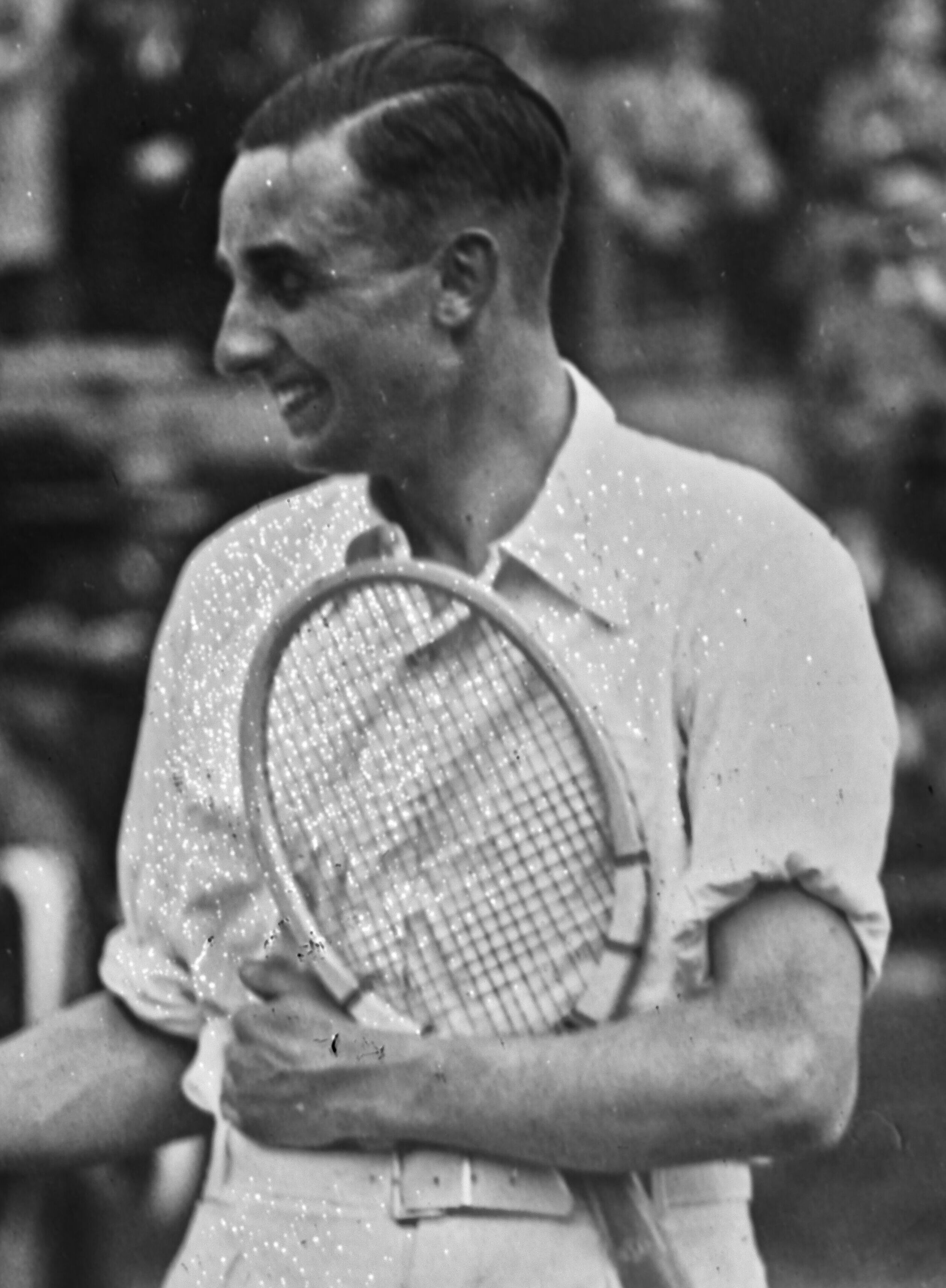
André Lacroix (1929)

André Lacroix (French pronunciation: [ɑ̃dʁe lakʁwa]; 2 October 1908 – 3 March 1992) was a Belgian tennis player.

== Biography ==
Lacroix was born in Forest, Belgium on 2 October 1908. He participated in several Wimbledon tournaments during the 1920s and 1930s. He also played for Belgium in Davis Cup several times, including against Sweden in 1934 and 1937, and Norway in 1936. Lacroix died in Bruges on 3 March 1992, at the age of 83.
