= Ladislav Hecht =

Czechoslovak-American tennis player

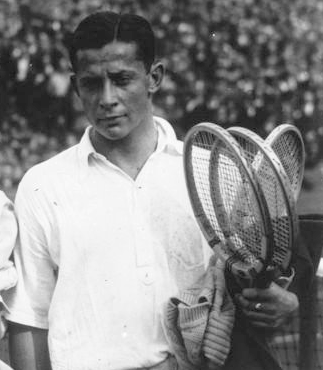
- Native name: Hecht László
- Country (sports): Czechoslovakia
- Born: August 31, 1909 Zsolna, Austria-Hungary (now Žilina, Slovakia)
- Died: May 27, 2004 (aged 94) Kew Gardens, Queens, New York City
- Plays: Right-handed

Singles
- Highest ranking: No. 6 (1934)

Grand Slam singles results
- French Open: 4R (1934, 1935, 1938)
- Wimbledon: QF (1938)
- US Open: 3R (1939, 1941, 1942, 1951)

Grand Slam doubles results
- French Open: SF (1934)
- Wimbledon: SF (1937)
- US Open: QF (1939)

Grand Slam mixed doubles results
- Wimbledon: 3R (1938)

Team competitions
- Davis Cup: F^{Eu} (1931, 1934, 1937)
Medal record
Maccabiah Games
Gold medal – first place	1932 Palestine	Men's singles

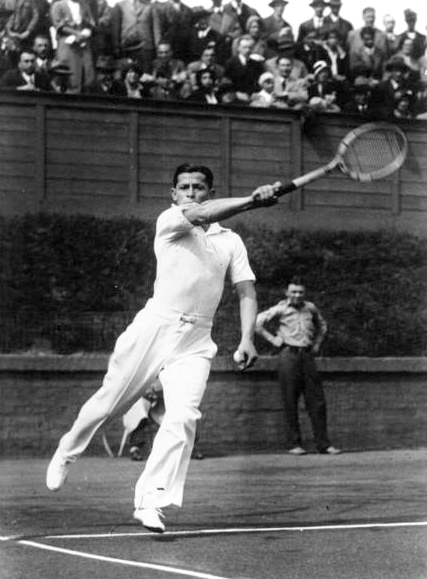
Ladislav Hecht

Ladislav Hecht (Czech pronunciation: [ˈlaɟɪslav ˈɦɛxt]; Hungarian: Hecht László [ˈhɛkt ˈlaːsloː]; August 31, 1909 – May 27, 2004) was a Jewish Czechoslovak-American professional tennis player. He won the gold medal in singles at the 1932 Maccabiah Games in Mandatory Palestine, and won the 1934 Hungarian International Tennis Singles Championship. In 1937 he reached the semifinals of the doubles at Wimbledon with Roderich Menzel, and the following year he reached the 1938 Wimbledon quarterfinals in singles. Despite being Jewish, he was invited to the Germany Davis Cup team in 1938 by an aide to Adolf Hitler who was not aware that he was Jewish, but chose not to accept the invitation. He represented Czechoslovakia in the Davis Cup during the 1930s, was captain of the team, and had a record of 18-19. In the 1930s, he was ranked world No. 6 in singles.

== Early life ==
Hecht was born in Zsolna, Kingdom of Hungary (today Žilina, Slovakia), on the nowadays border between Slovakia, Czechia and Poland, and was Jewish.

== Tennis career; interrupted by World War II ==
=== Europe ===
He began to learn tennis at age 11, and in 1931 he moved to Prague for better training conditions.

Hecht developed a successful tennis career, many considering him to be the best tennis player in Europe immediately before the Second World War.

In the 1930s, he was ranked world #6 in singles.

He won the gold medal in singles at the 1932 Maccabiah Games in Mandatory Palestine.

In 1934, Hecht won the Butler Trophy of Monte Carlo alongside Roderich Menzel, defeating Jacques Brugnon and Jean Lesueur in the final. In singles, he was victorious at the Hungarian International Tennis Championships, upsetting Henner Henkel of Germany in the semifinal and Ignacy Tłoczyński of Poland in the final. He reached the doubles finals with Josef Caska.

In late 1935 and early 1936, Hecht and Menzel toured the Far East, which included a visit to Japan to participate in the Japanese National Championships, where Menzel lost in the final, and they lost in the doubles final as well, both times to title defender Jiro Yamagishi. From there, they sailed to India where they were the finalists at the East of India Championships. Arriving home, he was defeated in the Czechoslovakian International Championship match by British player Fred Perry. He was a second straight time finalist in Budapest.

In 1937 he reached the semifinals of the doubles at Wimbledon with Menzel, and the following year he reached the 1938 Wimbledon quarterfinals in singles.

From 1930 to 1939, he played for the Czech Republic Davis Cup team, achieving a record of 18–19, and was its captain. In 1936, Hecht moved to Budapest, and then sought livelihood in Australia.

Hecht was invited to play for the German Davis Cup Team in 1938 after Germany acquired part of Czechoslovakia by an aide to Adolf Hitler who was unaware that he was Jewish, but he declined.

=== United States ===
He fled to the United States three days before the Nazi Germany invaded the Czech Lands in 1939, and became an American citizen. He worked in a munitions factory in New Jersey during World War II.

After the war, Hecht continued his tennis career, becoming a no. 1 ranked player in the eastern United States. In May 1941, he was the runner-up at the Brooklyn Tennis Tournament, losing to Pancho Segura. At the end of 1942 he was ranked # 10 of all men players in the United States.

In 1947, he won the Brooklyn Tennis Tournament at 38 years of age by beating Peruvian Enrique Buse in the final in straight sets. Hecht added the Eastern Clay Court Championships to his accolades the same year by defeating American Dick Savitt in the final in Jackson Heights, Queens.

In 1957, the USTA ranked him second in the country in senior singles, behind Bryan Grant.

=== Honors ===
Hecht was inducted into the International Jewish Sports Hall of Fame in 2005. In 2007 he was inducted into the Hall of Fame of Slovak Tennis.

== Later life ==
Hecht started toy and paintbrush businesses, and later in life lived in Queens, New York. Later in life was honored by the city of Bratislava, having a multisport stadium named after him in 1966.

He had two children, Timothy and Andrew, both of whom settled in Aspen, Colorado.

== See also ==
- List of select Jewish tennis players

== Works cited ==
=== Online media ===
- "Elected members". jewishsports.net. New York City, United States: International Jewish Sports Hall of Fame.
- "Keesing's Record of World Events". 1934. p. 1151. Archived from the original on March 3, 2016.

=== Books ===
- Skolnik, Fred, ed. (2007). "Tennis and Squash" (PDF). Encyclopaedia Judaica. Jerusalem, Israel: Keter Publishing House. ISBN 9780028660974.
- Wechsler, Bob (2008). Day By Day In Jewish Sports History. KTAV Publishing House. ISBN 9781602800137.
- Seebohm, Caroline (2009). Little Pancho: The Life of Tennis Legend Pancho Segura. University of Nebraska Press. ISBN 9780803220416.

=== Periodicals ===
- Kraśnicki, Krzysztof (2011). Mariusz Gazda (ed.). "Zapomniana legenda: Ignacy Tłoczyński" [The forgotten legend: Ignatius Tłoczyński]. Dobry Znak (in Polish). 4 (21). Wołomin, Poland: UBR Ltd. Archived from the original on December 12, 2013.
- Litsky, Frank (June 10, 2004). "Ladislav Hecht, 94, a Tactician On the Tennis Courts in the 30s". The New York Times. New York, United States. ISSN 0362-4331.
- "Czech tennis star seeks job" (pdf). The Canberra Times. XIII (3, 506). Canberra, Australia: Federal Capital Press of Australia: 1. December 14, 1938.
- "Sport" (PDF). Mariborer Zeitung (in German). 76 (105). Maribor, Slovenia: Marburger Verlags- und Druckerei Ges: 6. May 8, 1936.
- "American Tennis Championships". The Singapore Free Press and Mercantile Advertiser (15, 860). Singapore, Straits Settlements: Mohammed Eunos: 12. August 19, 1939.
- "World tennis". The Cairns Post. Vol. 52, no. 10, 086. Cairns QLD, Australia. June 4, 1934. p. 7.
- "Gábori revánsot vett Szigetin a teniszbajnokság elődöntőjében" [Gábori took revenge on Szigeti in the semifinals] (in Hungarian). Budapest, Hungary: Huszadik század. September 1935.
- "Schréderné – Paksyné nyerték a női páros teniszbajnokságot" [Schréderné – Paksyné won the ladies' doubles] (in Hungarian). Budapest, Hungary: Huszadik Század. September 1934.
- "Dalsze sukcesy Tłoczyńskiego na zawodach tenisowych w Budapeszcie" [More success for Tłoczyński at the tennis competition in Budapest] (djvu). Nowiny Codzienne (in Polish). III (250). Warsaw, Poland: 2. September 8, 1934.
- "Perry wins". The Argus (27, 981). Melbourne, Australia: Argus Office: 25. November 23, 1935.
- "Japanese Championships". The Sydney Morning Herald. 105 (30, 581). Sydney, Australia: John Fairfax and Sons: 18. November 25, 1935.
- "Lawn Tennis. Czechs do well in India". The Straits Times. Singapore, Straits Settlements: Straits Times Press: 14. January 8, 1936.
- Béla Kehrling, ed. (November 1, 1931). "A Csehszlovákiai Magyar Tenisz Szövetség első nemzetközi versenyének mérlege" [Balance sheet of the first international tournament of the Czechoslovakian Hungarian Tennis Association] (PDF). Tennisz és Golf (in Hungarian). III (20). Budapest, Hungary: Egyesült Kő-, Könyvnyomda. Könyv- és Lapkiadó Rt.: 391.
