= Henner Henkel =

German tennis player (1915–1943)

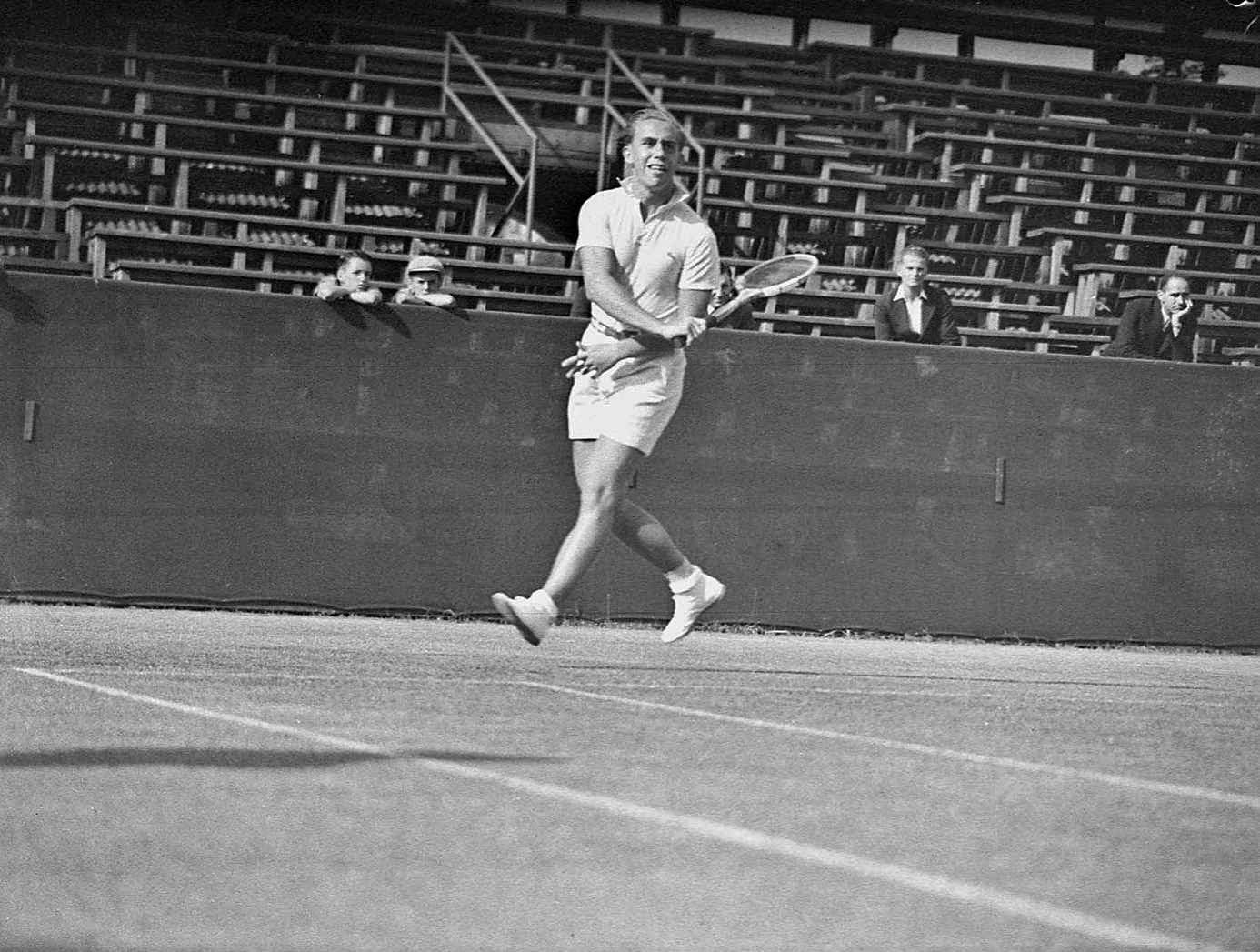
- Full name: Heinrich Ernst Otto Henkel
- Country (sports): (German Empire) / (Weimar Republic) / (Nazi Germany) Germany
- Born: 9 October 1915 Posen, Kingdom of Prussia, German Empire
- Died: 13 January 1943 (aged 27) near Voronezh, Russian SFSR, Soviet Union
- Turned pro: 1934 (amateur tour)
- Retired: 1943 (due to death)
- Plays: Right-handed (one-handed backhand)

Singles
- Career record: 165–76 (68.4%)
- Career titles: 12
- Highest ranking: No. 3 (1937, A. Wallis Myers)

Grand Slam singles results
- Australian Open: 3R (1938)
- French Open: W (1937)
- Wimbledon: SF (1938, 1939)
- US Open: 2R (1937)

Doubles

Grand Slam doubles results
- Australian Open: F (1938)
- French Open: W (1937)
- Wimbledon: F (1938)
- US Open: W (1937)

Grand Slam mixed doubles results
- Wimbledon: F (1938)

Team competitions
- Davis Cup: F (1935, 1936, 1937, 1938)

Heinrich Ernst Otto "Henner" Henkel (German pronunciation: [ˈhɛnɐ ˈhɛŋkl̩]; 9 October 1915 – 13 January 1943) was a German tennis player during the 1930s. His biggest success was his singles title at the 1937 French Championships.

== Biography ==
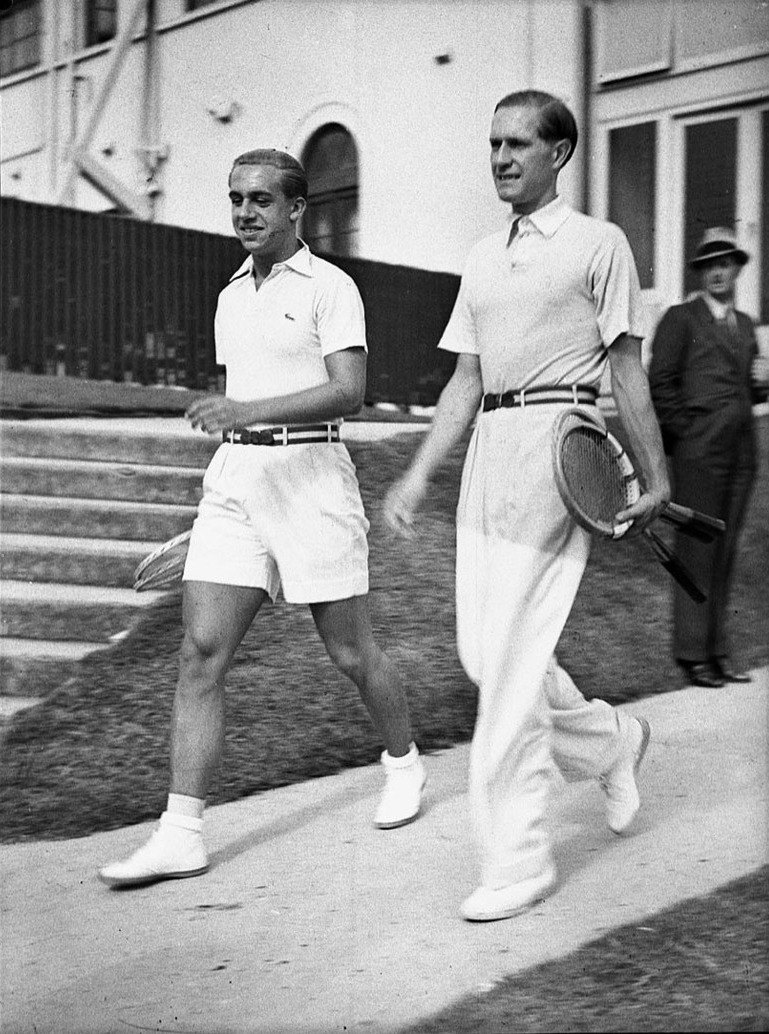
Henner Henkel (l) and Gottfried von Cramm (r) at White City, NSW (1937)

Henner was born in 1915 the son of Ferdinand and Margarete Henkel. After World War I, his family moved to Erfurt in 1919. He joined the Sportclub Erfurt (today TC Erfurt 93) together with his elder brother Ferdinand and learned to play tennis. His father moved to Berlin for job-related reasons, and his entire family followed in 1927.

In 1929, Henkel won the club championships of the THC 99 Berlin. In 1932 and 1933, he won the German junior championships. At age 15, he changed to Lawn-Tennis-Turnier-Club Rot-Weiß. In singles he was defeated by Ladislav Hecht in the final of the 1934 Hungarian International Tennis Championships.

Henkel was the second German, after Gottfried von Cramm in 1936, to win the singles title at the French Championships in 1937. The same year, he and Gottfried von Cramm won the Roland Garros doubles title. Later that year they also won the US Championships doubles title defeating Americans Don Budge and Gene Mako in three straight sets.

In March 1937, he became the singles champion at the Cairo International Championships defeating Giorgio de Stefani in the final in straight sets and also won the doubles title partnering Von Cramm. Later that year he won the singles title at the German Championships after a five-sets victory in the final over Vivian McGrath. Two years later, in 1939, he again won the title after defeating Roderich Menzel in the final in four sets.

Between 1934 and 1939 Henkel played 66 matches for the German Davis Cup team in 27 ties. He won 49 matches, lost 17 and was particularly successful in doubles, winning 16 of 20 matches partnering Gottfried von Cramm, Georg von Metaxa and Roderich Menzel.

Henkel played his last tournament at Bad Pyrmont in the summer of 1942. He reached the final which he lost to Roderich Menzel. During the tournament, he had already received his draft notice. In the Battle of Stalingrad, Henkel was shot in the upper leg. He died of this injury on 13 January 1943 near Voronezh.

Since 1950, the German junior team championship has been called the "Große Henner Henkel-Spiele" and since 1963, a commemorative tournament named the "Henner-Henkel-Gedächtnisturnier" has been held in Erfurt.

== Grand Slam finals ==
=== Singles (1 title) ===
Result	Year	Championship	Opponent	Score
Win	1937	French Championships	(United Kingdom) Bunny Austin	6–1, 6–4, 6–3

=== Doubles (2 titles, 2 runners-up) ===
Result	Year	Championship	Partner	Opponents	Score
Win	1937	French Championships	(Germany) Gottfried von Cramm	(South Africa) Vernon Kirby (South Africa) Norman Farquharson	6–4, 7–5, 3–6, 6–1
Win	1937	US Championships	(Germany) Gottfried von Cramm	(United States) Don Budge (United States) Gene Mako	6–4, 7–5, 6–4
Loss	1938	Australian Championships	(Germany) Gottfried von Cramm	(Australia) John Bromwich (Australia) Adrian Quist	5–7, 4–6, 0–6
Loss	1938	Wimbledon	(Germany) Georg von Metaxa	(United States) Don Budge (United States) Gene Mako	4–6, 6–3, 3–6, 6–8

=== Mixed doubles (1 runner-up) ===
Result	Year	Championship	Partner	Opponents	Score
Loss	1938	Wimbledon	(United States) Sarah Palfrey	(United States) Alice Marble (United States) Don Budge	1–6, 4–6
