= Georg von Metaxa =

Austrian tennis player

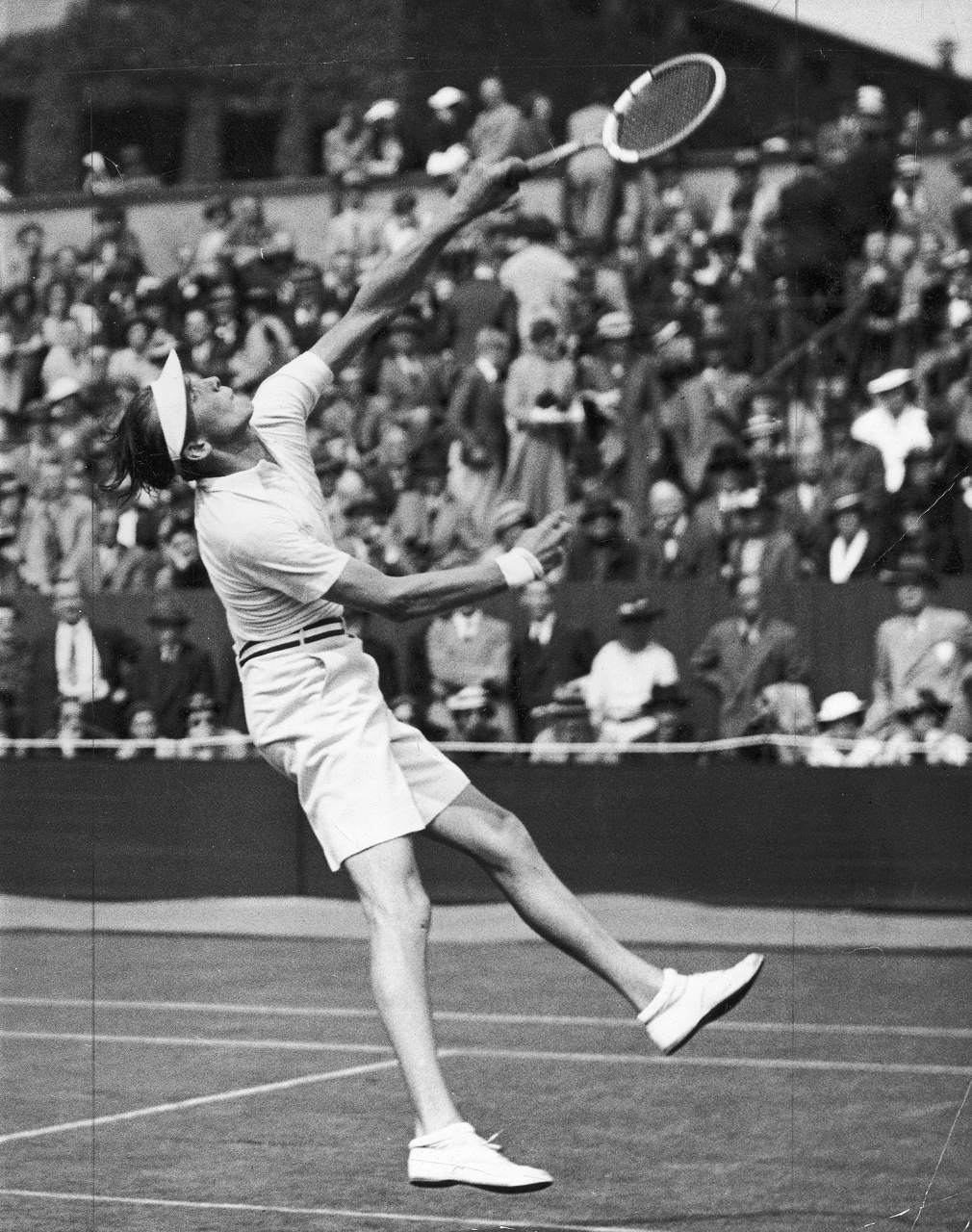
- Von Metaxa in 1937
- Full name: Georg Felix Ritter von Metaxa
- Country (sports): Austria (1918–38); Nazi Germany (1938–44)
- Born: 7 October 1914 Vienna, Austria-Hungary
- Died: 12 December 1944 (aged 30) Arnoldsweiler near Düren, Germany
- Plays: Left-handed

Singles

Grand Slam singles results
- French Open: 3R (1936, 1937)
- Wimbledon: 2R (1935, 1938)

Doubles

Grand Slam doubles results
- French Open: 3R (1937)
- Wimbledon: F (1938)

Mixed doubles

Grand Slam mixed doubles results
- French Open: 3R (1937)
- Wimbledon: 4R (1938)

Georg Felix Ritter von Metaxa (Greek: Γεώργιος φον Μεταξάς; 7 October 1914 – 12 December 1944) was an Austrian tennis player active in the 1930s.

== Biography ==
Von Metaxa was born in Vienna to a Greek father and Austrian mother. His father Stefan, a lawyer, was head of the Vienna district of Hietzing, his mother Marianne was born countess of Stainach. In his youth, he was expelled from several schools until he came to the Süddeutsche Landeserziehungsheim, a college at Schondorf am Ammersee. A talented tennis player, he lost the final of the 1932 German boys championships to Henner Henkel. After graduating from school with the Abitur, he began to study law at Vienna but broke off soon in order to focus on his tennis career.

In 1937 Metaxa won the Austrian national championships, defeating Roderich Menzel in the final. He played 16 matches for the Austrian Davis Cup team between 1933 and 1937, reaching the semifinal of the European zone in 1936. After the annexation of Austria into Nazi Germany in March 1938, Metaxa decided to join the German Davis Cup team for which he played 19 matches until the beginning of World War II. He was ranked the second best German player in 1938. In July 1938 he reached the final of the Wimbledon doubles competition with his partner Henner Henkel which they lost in four sets to the American duo Don Budge and Gene Mako.

After the beginning of World War II, he was drafted into the German Wehrmacht. He played an exhibition match against Hans Nüsslein in December 1941. An Obergefreiter (PFC), Metaxa was killed in action by American artillery fire at the town of Arnoldsweiler near Düren on 12 December 1944.

== Grand Slam finals ==
=== Doubles (1 runner-up) ===
Result	Year	Championship	Surface	Partner	Opponents	Score
Loss	1938	Wimbledon	Grass	(Germany) Henner Henkel	(United States) Don Budge (United States) Gene Mako	4–6, 6–3, 3–6, 6–8
