= 1939 Wimbledon Championships – Men's doubles =

Men's doubles
- 1939 Wimbledon Championships

Final
- Champions: (United States) Elwood Cooke (United States) Bobby Riggs
- Runners-up: (United Kingdom) Charles Hare (United Kingdom) Frank Wilde
- Score: 6–3, 3–6, 6–3, 9–7

Details
- Draw: 64 (5Q)
- Seeds: 4

Events
Singles	men	women		boys	girls
Doubles	men	women	mixed	boys	girls
- Wimbledon Championships

Don Budge and Gene Mako were the defending champions, but were ineligible to compete after turning professional.

Elwood Cooke and Bobby Riggs defeated Charles Hare and Frank Wilde in the final, 6–3, 3–6, 6–3, 9–7 to win the gentlemen's doubles tennis title at the 1939 Wimbledon Championship.

== Seeds ==
1. (Germany) Henner Henkel / (Germany) Georg von Metaxa (second round)
2. (United States) Elwood Cooke / (United States) Bobby Riggs (champions)
3. (France) Jean Borotra / (France) Jacques Brugnon (semifinals)
4. (United Kingdom) Charles Hare / (United Kingdom) Frank Wilde (final)

Click on the seed number of a player to go to their draw section.

== Draw ==
Key

- Q = Qualifier
- WC = Wild card
- LL = Lucky loser
- Alt = Alternate
- ITF = ITF entry
- PR = Protected ranking
- SR = Special ranking
- SE = Special exempt
- JE = Junior exempt
- JR = Junior Accelerator Programme entrant
- CO = College Accelerator Programme entrant
- NG = Next Gen Accelerator Program entrant
- w/o = Walkover
- r = Retired
- d = Defaulted

=== Finals ===
Quarterfinals
(United Kingdom) John Olliff (United Kingdom) Ronnie Shayes	6	5	13	6	6
(Netherlands) Tod Hughan (Netherlands) Hans van Swol	8	7	11	3	2
4	(United Kingdom) Charles Hare (United Kingdom) Frank Wilde	6	6	7
(Kingdom of Yugoslavia) Dragutin Mitić (Kingdom of Yugoslavia) Franjo Punčec	1	1	5
(United Kingdom) Don Butler (United Kingdom) Donald MacPhail	9	6	2	3	4
3	(France) Jean Borotra (France) Jacques Brugnon	7	3	6	6	6
(United Kingdom) Henry Billington (United Kingdom) Pat Hughes	3	6	8	2	9
2	(United States) Elwood Cooke (United States) Bobby Riggs	6	3	6	6	11

Semifinals
(United Kingdom) John Olliff (United Kingdom) Ronnie Shayes	2	4	4
4	(United Kingdom) Charles Hare (United Kingdom) Frank Wilde	6	6	6
3	(France) Jean Borotra (France) Jacques Brugnon	4	6	2	3
2	(United States) Elwood Cooke (United States) Bobby Riggs	6	3	6	6

Final
4	(United Kingdom) Charles Hare (United Kingdom) Frank Wilde	3	6	3	7
2	(United States) Elwood Cooke (United States) Bobby Riggs	6	3	6	9

=== Top half ===
==== Section 1 ====
First round
1	(Germany) Henner Henkel (Germany) Georg von Metaxa	6	6	6
(United Kingdom) Douglas Freshwater (United Kingdom) Bill Manby	4	1	4
(United States) Don McNeill (United States) Gene Smith
(Republic of China (1912–1949)) Kho Sin-Kie (Republic of Ireland) George Lyttleton-Rogers	w/o
(United Kingdom) John Olliff (United Kingdom) Ronnie Shayes	6	6	8
Q	(United Kingdom) John Briggs (United Kingdom) Brian Finnigan	2	4	6
(Czechoslovakia) Josef Šíba (United Kingdom) Laddie Wheatcroft	6	1	6	3	3
(United Kingdom) Geoff Emmett (United Kingdom) Bobby Nicoll	1	6	3	6	6
(Switzerland) Max Ellmer (Switzerland) Hans Pfaff	4	3	2
(Belgium) Léopold de Borman (Belgium) Pierre Geelhand de Merxem	6	6	6
(United Kingdom) Harold Hare (United Kingdom) Claude Lister	6	7	6	6	6
(Italy) Vanni Canepele (Italy) Giorgio de Stefani	8	5	3	7	4
(United Kingdom) Ted Avory (United Kingdom) Harry Lee	3	7	4
(Netherlands) Tod Hughan (Netherlands) Hans van Swol	6	9	6
(France) Christian Boussus (France) Antoine Gentien	7	6	6
Q	(United Kingdom) Freddie Della Porta (United Kingdom) Leslie Walter	5	3	4

Second round
1	(Germany) H Henkel (Germany) G von Metaxa	3	5	5
(United States) D McNeill (United States) E Smith	6	7	7
(United Kingdom) J Olliff (United Kingdom) R Shayes	6	6	6
(United Kingdom) G Emmett (United Kingdom) R Nicoll	2	4	4
(Belgium) L de Borman (Belgium) P Geelhand de Merxem	3	6	8	6	6
(United Kingdom) H Hare (United Kingdom) C Lister	6	3	10	4	4
(Netherlands) T Hughan (Netherlands) A van Swol	3	2	6	8	6
(France) C Boussus (France) A Gentien	6	6	3	6	3

Third round
(United States) D McNeill (United States) E Smith	8	6	3	3	4
(United Kingdom) J Olliff (United Kingdom) R Shayes	6	4	6	6	6
(Belgium) L de Borman (Belgium) P Geelhand de Merxem	4	5	3
(Netherlands) T Hughan (Netherlands) A van Swol	6	7	6

Quarterfinals
(United Kingdom) J Olliff (United Kingdom) R Shayes	6	5	13	6	6
(Netherlands) T Hughan (Netherlands) A van Swol	8	7	11	3	2

==== Section 2 ====
First round
4	(United Kingdom) Charles Hare (United Kingdom) Frank Wilde	9	6	6
(Republic of Ireland) Raymond Egan (South Africa) Eustace Fannin	7	3	4
Q	(Hungary) Kálmán Aschner (India) Chuni Savara	4	4	2
(Hungary) József Asbóth (Hungary) Mihály Csikós	6	6	6
(New Zealand) Neil Edwards (United Kingdom) Roland Morton	6	6	2	7
(United Kingdom) GI Bayley (Republic of China (1912–1949)) Ho Jin	3	2	6	5
Q	(United Kingdom) Headley Baxter (United Kingdom) Bunny Whiteman	6	6	6
(United Kingdom) GL Mytton (United Kingdom) John Tew	3	4	4
(Germany) Daniel Prenn (Belgium) Jack Van den Eynde	4	5	6	3
(New Zealand) Dennis Coombe (New Zealand) Cam Malfroy	6	7	3	6
(United Kingdom) JK Hamilton (United Kingdom) Derrick Leyland	4	6	2	3
(Germany) Helmuth Gulcz (Denmark) Helge Plougmann	6	4	6	6
(United Kingdom) Jack Piercy (United Kingdom) Dickie Ritchie	w/o
(United Kingdom) Brian Sturgeon (United Kingdom) Gwyn Tuckett
(United Kingdom) Cecil Betts (United Kingdom) Bob Mulliken	1	2	3
(Kingdom of Yugoslavia) Dragutin Mitić (Kingdom of Yugoslavia) Franjo Punčec	6	6	6

Second round
4	(United Kingdom) C Hare (United Kingdom) F Wilde	8	6	6
(Hungary) J Asbóth (Hungary) M Csikós	6	4	4
(New Zealand) N Edwards (United Kingdom) R Morton	7	6	7	1	6
Q	(United Kingdom) H Baxter (United Kingdom) B Whiteman	5	3	9	6	2
(New Zealand) D Coombe (New Zealand) C Malfroy	6	8	8
(Germany) H Gulcz (Denmark) H Plougmann	2	6	6
(United Kingdom) B Sturgeon (United Kingdom) G Tuckett	5	3	2
(Kingdom of Yugoslavia) D Mitić (Kingdom of Yugoslavia) F Punčec	7	6	6

Third round
4	(United Kingdom) C Hare (United Kingdom) F Wilde	6	6	6
(New Zealand) N Edwards (United Kingdom) R Morton	1	3	3
(New Zealand) D Coombe (New Zealand) C Malfroy	9	6	4	0	4
(Kingdom of Yugoslavia) D Mitić (Kingdom of Yugoslavia) F Punčec	7	4	6	6	6

Quarterfinals
4	(United Kingdom) C Hare (United Kingdom) F Wilde	6	6	7
(Kingdom of Yugoslavia) D Mitić (Kingdom of Yugoslavia) F Punčec	1	1	5

=== Bottom half ===
==== Section 3 ====
First round
(France) Robert Abdesselam (Kingdom of Yugoslavia) Franjo Kukuljević	4	8	4	6	4
(Argentina) Hector Etchart (Argentina) Alejo Russell	6	6	6	2	6
(Czechoslovakia) František Cejnar (Czechoslovakia) Jaroslav Drobný	8	6	9
(United Kingdom) Murray Deloford (United Kingdom) Jimmy Jones	6	3	7
(India) Ghaus Mohammad (India) Yeswanath-Rao Savoor	3	5	6	3
(United Kingdom) Don Butler (United Kingdom) Donald MacPhail	6	7	4	6
(United Kingdom) Derek Bull (United Kingdom) Guy Cooper	3	6	6	6
(United Kingdom) Tony Mottram (United Kingdom) Norman Taylor	6	2	3	4
(United Kingdom) Ian Collins (United Kingdom) Bob Tinkler	14	6	3	6
(Romania) Cristea Caralulis (Romania) Arnulf Schmidt	12	2	6	4
(United Kingdom) John Comery (United Kingdom) Jimmy Hunt	7	6	6	1	2
(Hungary) György Dallos (Kingdom of Yugoslavia) Josip Palada	7	4	3	6	6
(United Kingdom) Tommy Anderson (United Kingdom) Jack Harrison	4	4	4
(New Zealand) Dewar Brown (New Zealand) Jack Gunn	6	6	6
(Germany) Rolf Göpfert (Czechoslovakia) Roderich Menzel	6	6	3	4	2
3	(France) Jean Borotra (France) Jacques Brugnon	2	4	6	6	6

Second round
(Argentina) H Etchart (Argentina) A Russell
(Czechoslovakia) F Cejnar (Czechoslovakia) J Drobný	w/o
(United Kingdom) D Butler (United Kingdom) D MacPhail	9	6	7
(United Kingdom) D Bull (United Kingdom) G Cooper	7	3	5
(United Kingdom) I Collins (United Kingdom) R Tinkler	4	3	7	7	6
(Hungary) G Dallos (Kingdom of Yugoslavia) J Palada	6	6	5	5	2
(New Zealand) D Brown (New Zealand) J Gunn	1	7	2
3	(France) J Borotra (France) J Brugnon	6	9	6

Third round
(Argentina) H Etchart (Argentina) A Russell	4	3	11
(United Kingdom) D Butler (United Kingdom) D MacPhail	6	6	13
(United Kingdom) I Collins (United Kingdom) R Tinkler	6	4	4	4
3	(France) J Borotra (France) J Brugnon	4	6	6	6

Quarterfinals
(United Kingdom) D Butler (United Kingdom) D MacPhail	9	6	2	3	4
3	(France) J Borotra (France) J Brugnon	7	3	6	6	6

==== Section 4 ====
First round
(Switzerland) Hector Fisher (Switzerland) Boris Maneff	4	4	1
(Hungary) Emil Gábori (Hungary) Ottó Szigeti	6	6	6
(United Kingdom) Reginald Bessemer-Clark (Australia) Alan Coldham	4	2	2
(United Kingdom) Eric Peters (United Kingdom) Colin Ritchie	6	6	6
(United Kingdom) Henry Billington (United Kingdom) Pat Hughes	7	6	8	6
(Romania) Alexandru Hamburger (Australia) Garton Hone	9	3	6	3
(United States) Owen Anderson (United States) Bill Robertson	0	3	2
(United Kingdom) Edmund David (United Kingdom) Herman David	6	6	6
(United Kingdom) George Godsell (United Kingdom) Pat Sherwood	6	6	6
(Monaco) Gaston Médécin (Egypt) Andre Najar	1	3	0
(Germany) Heinrich Kleinschroth (Greece) Georgios Nikolaides	2	3	6	4
(Poland) Adam Baworowski (Poland) Ignacy Tłoczyński	6	6	1	6
Q	(United Kingdom) CF Hall (United Kingdom) FG Hill	5	6	6	6
(United Kingdom) Gordon Fitt (United Kingdom) Jimmy Reddall	7	3	3	4
(United Kingdom) Eric Filby (United Kingdom) Laurie Shaffi	3	3	2
2	(United States) Elwood Cooke (United States) Bobby Riggs	6	6	6

Second round
(Hungary) E Gábori (Hungary) O Szigeti	6	6	6
(United Kingdom) E Peters (United Kingdom) C Ritchie	2	4	3
(United Kingdom) H Billington (United Kingdom) P Hughes	6	6	10
(United Kingdom) E David (United Kingdom) H David	3	0	8
(United Kingdom) G Godsell (United Kingdom) P Sherwood	6	8	6
(Poland) A Baworowski (Poland) I Tłoczyński	2	6	3
Q	(United Kingdom) CF Hall (United Kingdom) FG Hill	2	1	3
2	(United States) E Cooke (United States) R Riggs	6	6	6

Third round
(Hungary) E Gábori (Hungary) O Szigeti	2	6	6	3	2
(United Kingdom) H Billington (United Kingdom) P Hughes	6	4	4	6	6
(United Kingdom) G Godsell (United Kingdom) P Sherwood	3	3	3
2	(United States) E Cooke (United States) R Riggs	6	6	6

Quarterfinals
(United Kingdom) H Billington (United Kingdom) P Hughes	3	6	8	2	9
2	(United States) E Cooke (United States) R Riggs	6	3	6	6	11
