= 1939 Wimbledon Championships – Mixed doubles =

Mixed doubles
- 1939 Wimbledon Championships

Final
- Champions: (United States) Bobby Riggs (United States) Alice Marble
- Runners-up: (United Kingdom) Frank Wilde (United Kingdom) Nina Brown
- Score: 9–7, 6–1

Details
- Draw: 80 (5Q)
- Seeds: 4

Events
Singles	men	women		boys	girls
Doubles	men	women	mixed	boys	girls
- Wimbledon Championships

Don Budge and Alice Marble were the defending champions, but Budge was ineligible to compete after turning professional at the end of the 1938 season. Marble partnered with Bobby Riggs and defeated Frank Wilde and Nina Brown in the final, 9–7, 6–1 to win the mixed doubles tennis title at the 1939 Wimbledon Championships.

== Seeds ==
1. (United States) Elwood Cooke / (United States) Sarah Fabyan (semifinals)
2. (United States) Bobby Riggs / (United States) Alice Marble (champions)
3. (New Zealand) Cam Malfroy / (United Kingdom) Betty Nuthall (semifinals)
4. (Kingdom of Yugoslavia) Franjo Kukuljević / (France) Simonne Mathieu (fourth round)

Click on the seed number of a player to go to their draw section.

== Draw ==
Key

- Q = Qualifier
- WC = Wild card
- LL = Lucky loser
- Alt = Alternate
- ITF = ITF entry
- PR = Protected ranking
- SR = Special ranking
- SE = Special exempt
- JE = Junior exempt
- JR = Junior Accelerator Programme entrant
- CO = College Accelerator Programme entrant
- NG = Next Gen Accelerator Program entrant
- w/o = Walkover
- r = Retired
- d = Defaulted

=== Finals ===
Quarterfinals
2	(United States) Bobby Riggs (United States) Alice Marble	5	6	6
(United Kingdom) Jimmy Jones (United Kingdom) Ermyntrude Harvey	7	1	3
3	(New Zealand) Cam Malfroy (United Kingdom) Betty Nuthall	6	2	6
(Belgium) Pierre Geelhand de Merxem (Belgium) Josane de Meulemeester	3	6	4
(United States) Don McNeill (United Kingdom) Kay Stammers	4	6	1
(United Kingdom) Frank Wilde (United Kingdom) Nina Brown	6	3	6
(Argentina) Alejo Russell (United Kingdom) Freda Hammersley	5	6	2
1	(United States) Elwood Cooke (United States) Sarah Fabyan	7	3	6

Semifinals
2	(United States) Bobby Riggs (United States) Alice Marble	3	6	6
3	(New Zealand) Cam Malfroy (United Kingdom) Betty Nuthall	6	2	4
(United Kingdom) Frank Wilde (United Kingdom) Nina Brown	6	7
1	(United States) Elwood Cooke (United States) Sarah Fabyan	3	5

Final
2	(United States) Bobby Riggs (United States) Alice Marble	9	6
(United Kingdom) Frank Wilde (United Kingdom) Nina Brown	7	1

=== Top half ===
==== Section 1 ====
First round

Second round
2	(United States) Bobby Riggs (United States) Alice Marble	6	6
(United Kingdom) Cliff Hovell (United Kingdom) Denise Huntbach	3	1
(Denmark) Helge Plougmann (Greece) Phyllis Xydis	2	3
(United Kingdom) Eric Filby (United Kingdom) Mary Whitmarsh	6	6
(United Kingdom) Bob Mulliken (United Kingdom) Sheila Kenyon	6	6
(United Kingdom) Ronnie Shayes (United Kingdom) Jean Saunders	3	3
(United Kingdom) Jack Harrison (United Kingdom) Mary Sargeant	2	2
Q	(United Kingdom) John Fulton (United Kingdom) Lesley Fulton	6	6

Third round
2	(United States) R Riggs (United States) A Marble	6	6
(United Kingdom) E Filby (United Kingdom) M Whitmarsh	0	3
(United Kingdom) R Mulliken (United Kingdom) S Kenyon	6	4	6
Q	(United Kingdom) J Fulton (United Kingdom) L Fulton	4	6	4

Fourth round
2	(United States) R Riggs (United States) A Marble	6	6
(United Kingdom) R Mulliken (United Kingdom) S Kenyon	2	2

==== Section 2 ====
First round

Second round
(United Kingdom) Harold Hare (United Kingdom) Betty Batt	6	7
(Hungary) György Dallos (United Kingdom) Alex McKelvie	4	5
(Germany) Rolf Göpfert (Germany) Anneliese Ullstein	6	3	6
(Romania) Arnulf Schmidt (Romania) Magda Berescu	2	6	1
(United Kingdom) Donald MacPhail (United Kingdom) Anita Ellis	6	6	6
(United States) Bill Robertson (United Kingdom) Effie Peters	8	3	4
(France) Jean Borotra (United Kingdom) Peggy Scriven	6	1	4
(United Kingdom) Jimmy Jones (United Kingdom) Ermyntrude Harvey	1	6	6

Third round
(United Kingdom) H Hare (United Kingdom) E Batt
(Germany) R Göpfert (Germany) A Ullstein	w/o
(United Kingdom) D MacPhail (United Kingdom) A Ellis	2	3
(United Kingdom) C Jones (United Kingdom) E Harvey	6	6

Fourth round
(United Kingdom) H Hare (United Kingdom) E Batt	2	4
(United Kingdom) C Jones (United Kingdom) E Harvey	6	6

==== Section 3 ====
First round

Second round
3	(New Zealand) Cam Malfroy (United Kingdom) Betty Nuthall	6	6
(Hungary) Ottó Szigeti (Hungary) Klára Somogyi	4	2
(Kingdom of Yugoslavia) Dragutin Mitić (Kingdom of Yugoslavia) Hella Kovač	5	10	6
Q	(United Kingdom) B Butters (United Kingdom) Peggy Brace	7	8	3
(Argentina) Hector Etchart (United Kingdom) Pamela Morison
(Czechoslovakia) Jaroslav Drobný (Czechoslovakia) Eva Poráková	w/o
(United Kingdom) John Olliff (United Kingdom) Jean Nicoll	10	6
(Netherlands) Tod Hughan (United Kingdom) Gem Hoahing	8	4

Third round
3	(New Zealand) C Malfroy (United Kingdom) B Nuthall	7	8
(Kingdom of Yugoslavia) D Mitić (Kingdom of Yugoslavia) H Kovač	5	6
(Argentina) H Etchart (United Kingdom) P Morison	3	3
(United Kingdom) J Olliff (United Kingdom) J Nicoll	6	6

Fourth round
3	(New Zealand) C Malfroy (United Kingdom) B Nuthall	6	7
(United Kingdom) J Olliff (United Kingdom) J Nicoll	3	5

==== Section 4 ====
First round
(Belgium) Pierre Geelhand de Merxem (Belgium) Josane de Meulemeester	6	3	9
(New Zealand) Dennis Coombe (United Kingdom) Phyllis King	4	6	7
(Belgium) Léopold de Borman (United Kingdom) Susan Noel	6	3	3
Q	(United Kingdom) Bert Whitney (United Kingdom) Pam Seaton	3	6	6
(Netherlands) Hans van Swol (United States) Dorothy Andrus
(United Kingdom) Harold Hare (United Kingdom) Mary Hardwick	w/o
(Switzerland) Max Ellmer (Luxembourg) Alice Weiwers	6	3	6
(New Zealand) Neil Edwards (United Kingdom) Thelma Jarvis	1	6	4
(United Kingdom) Don Butler (United Kingdom) Valerie Scott	4	9
(United Kingdom) Bob Tinkler (United Kingdom) Margot Lumb	6	11
(New Zealand) Dewar Brown (United Kingdom) Rosemary Thomas	6	6
(Czechoslovakia) Josef Šíba (United Kingdom) Elsie Pittman	3	3
(United Kingdom) GI Bayley (United Kingdom) Audrey Roberts	4	8	7
(Germany) Georg von Metaxa (Germany) Inge Schumann	6	6	5
(United Kingdom) Jack Lysaght (United Kingdom) Billie Yorke	4	3
(France) Christian Boussus (France) Sylvie Henrotin	6	6

Second round
(Belgium) P Geelhand de Merxem (Belgium) J de Meulemeester	6	6
Q	(United Kingdom) H Whitney (United Kingdom) P Seaton	2	2
(Netherlands) A van Swol (United States) D Andrus	8	8	7
(Switzerland) M Ellmer (Luxembourg) A Weiwers	6	10	9
(United Kingdom) R Tinkler (United Kingdom) M Lumb	6	6
(New Zealand) D Brown (United Kingdom) R Thomas	1	1
(United Kingdom) GI Bayley (United Kingdom) A Roberts	4	3
(France) C Boussus (France) S Henrotin	6	6

Third round
(Belgium) P Geelhand de Merxem (Belgium) J de Meulemeester	6	6
(Switzerland) M Ellmer (Luxembourg) A Weiwers	2	3
(United Kingdom) R Tinkler (United Kingdom) M Lumb	5	4
(France) C Boussus (France) S Henrotin	7	6

Fourth round
(Belgium) P Geelhand de Merxem (Belgium) J de Meulemeester	6	1	6
(France) C Boussus (France) S Henrotin	4	6	3

=== Bottom half ===
==== Section 5 ====
First round
(Poland) Ignacy Tłoczyński (France) Suzanne Pannetier	2	0
(Germany) Helmuth Gulcz (Germany) Thilde Dietz	6	6
Q	GE Bean (United Kingdom) Betty Uber	2	1
(United States) Don McNeill (United Kingdom) Kay Stammers	6	6
(United Kingdom) Harry Lee (United Kingdom) Nancy Macpherson-Grant	1	4
(Germany) Henner Henkel (United States) Grace Wheeler	6	6
(United Kingdom) Jock Findlay (United Kingdom) Dorothy Shepherd-Barron	2	6	3
(United Kingdom) John Comery (United Kingdom) Audrey Cardinall	6	3	6
(Poland) Adam Baworowski (Poland) Jadwiga Jędrzejowska	7	4	9
(United States) Owen Anderson (United Kingdom) Rita Jarvis	5	6	7
(United Kingdom) Guy Cooper (United Kingdom) Evelyn Dearman	6	6
(United Kingdom) Herman David (United Kingdom) Mary Cartwright	2	3
(Kingdom of Yugoslavia) Franjo Punčec (Kingdom of Yugoslavia) Alicia Florian	7	3	9
(United Kingdom) Pat Sherwood (United Kingdom) Elsa Haylock	5	6	7
(United Kingdom) Bill Manby (United Kingdom) Joan Strawson	6	6
(United Kingdom) Colin Ritchie (United Kingdom) Penny Durlac	2	2

Second round
(Germany) H Gulcz (Germany) T Dietz	12	3
(United States) D McNeill (United Kingdom) K Stammers	14	6
(Germany) H Henkel (United States) G Wheeler	6	6
(United Kingdom) J Comery (United Kingdom) A Cardinall	4	4
(Poland) A Baworowski (Poland) J Jędrzejowska	2	3
(United Kingdom) G Cooper (United Kingdom) E Dearman	6	6
(Kingdom of Yugoslavia) F Punčec (Kingdom of Yugoslavia) A Florian	6	6	6
(United Kingdom) N Manby (United Kingdom) J Strawson	8	1	2

Third round
(United States) D McNeill (United Kingdom) K Stammers	6	6
(Germany) H Henkel (United States) G Wheeler	4	3
(United Kingdom) G Cooper (United Kingdom) E Dearman	3	1
(Kingdom of Yugoslavia) F Punčec (Kingdom of Yugoslavia) A Florian	6	6

Fourth round
(United States) D McNeill (United Kingdom) K Stammers	6	8
(Kingdom of Yugoslavia) F Punčec (Kingdom of Yugoslavia) A Florian	3	6

The nationality of GE Bean is unknown.

==== Section 6 ====
First round

Second round
(Switzerland) Jost Spitzer (United Kingdom) Gaby Curtis	6	2
(United Kingdom) Frank Wilde (United Kingdom) Nina Brown	8	6
(France) Antoine Gentien (France) Arlette Halff	5	6	1
(Australia) Garton Hone (Australia) Thora Geddes	7	4	6
(United Kingdom) Murray Deloford (United Kingdom) Betty Clements	6	7
(Hungary) Emil Gábori (Italy) Vittoria Tonolli	4	5
(United Kingdom) Bobby Meredith (United Kingdom) Ruth Kirk	3	1
4	(Kingdom of Yugoslavia) Franjo Kukuljević (France) Simonne Mathieu	6	6

Third round
(United Kingdom) F Wilde (United Kingdom) N Brown	7	6
(Australia) G Hone (Australia) T Geddes	5	1
(United Kingdom) M Deloford (United Kingdom) E Clements	1	4
4	(Kingdom of Yugoslavia) F Kukuljević (France) S Mathieu	6	6

Fourth round
(United Kingdom) F Wilde (United Kingdom) N Brown	6	3	6
4	(Kingdom of Yugoslavia) F Kukuljević (France) S Mathieu	3	6	3

==== Section 7 ====
First round

Second round
(Switzerland) Hector Fisher (Netherlands) Madzy Couquerque	3	1
(Argentina) Alejo Russell (United Kingdom) Freda Hammersley	6	6
Q	(United Kingdom) Bobby Nicoll (United Kingdom) Audrey Wenyon
(United Kingdom) Dickie Ritchie (United Kingdom) Patsy O'Connell	w/o
(South Africa) Eustace Fannin (Republic of Ireland) Joy Myerscough	3	9	6
(United Kingdom) Jimmy Hunt (United Kingdom) Yvonne Law	6	7	8
(Italy) Vanni Canepele (Italy) Wally San Donnino	8	8
(United Kingdom) Ian Collins (United Kingdom) Lady Rowallan	6	6

Third round
(Argentina) A Russell (United Kingdom) F Hammersley	6	6
Q	(United Kingdom) R Nicoll (United Kingdom) A Wenyon	2	3
(United Kingdom) J Hunt (United Kingdom) Y Law	4	1
(Italy) G Canepele (Italy) W San Donnino	6	6

Fourth round
(Argentina) A Russell (United Kingdom) F Hammersley	8	5	6
(Italy) G Canepele (Italy) W San Donnino	6	7	2

==== Section 8 ====
First round

Second round
(United Kingdom) Edmund David (United Kingdom) Peggy Knight
(Republic of China (1912–1949)) Kho Sin-Kie (United Kingdom) Diana Wood	w/o
(United Kingdom) Henry Billington (United Kingdom) Joan Ingram	6	7
(France) Jacques Brugnon (United Kingdom) Nancy Glover	1	5
(United Kingdom) Tommy Anderson (United Kingdom) Rosemary Smith	3	4
(United Kingdom) Pat Hughes (United Kingdom) Dorothy Little	6	6
(Belgium) Jack Van den Eynde (United Kingdom) Muriel Bray	4	4
1	(United States) Elwood Cooke (United States) Sarah Fabyan	6	6

Third round
(United Kingdom) E David (United Kingdom) P Knight	1	2
(United Kingdom) H Billington (United Kingdom) J Ingram	6	6
(United Kingdom) P Hughes (United Kingdom) D Little	7	0	4
1	(United States) E Cooke (United States) S Fabyan	5	6	6

Fourth round
(United Kingdom) H Billington (United Kingdom) J Ingram	2	2
1	(United States) E Cooke (United States) S Fabyan	6	6
