= 1936 Wimbledon Championships – Men's singles =

Men's singles
- 1936 Wimbledon Championships

Final
- Champion: (United Kingdom) Fred Perry
- Runner-up: (Germany) Gottfried von Cramm
- Score: 6–1, 6–1, 6–0

Details
- Draw: 128 (10Q)
- Seeds: 8

Events
Singles	men	women		boys	girls
Doubles	men	women	mixed	boys	girls
- Wimbledon Championships

Two-time defending champion Fred Perry defeated Gottfried von Cramm in a rematch of the previous year's final, 6–1, 6–1, 6–0 to win the gentlemen's singles tennis title at the 1936 Wimbledon Championships. Perry's victory was the last Wimbledon men's singles title won by a Briton until Andy Murray won in 2013.

== Progress of the competition ==
Perry was on the verge of turning professional, and his decision to compete in the Wimbledon singles first was a risky one because losing would have made him less attractive to the professional ranks, whilst winning would ensure financially beneficial offers. His semifinal against Don Budge was a much harder match than the final against second-seeded Gottfried von Cramm, who sustained an injury during the match but insisted on seeing it through to the conclusion.

The second-best British player, number 7 seed Henry "Bunny" Austin, who was already thirty, was defeated by von Cramm in the semifinals, but two years later he would go on to be the last Briton to contest a Men's Singles final before Andy Murray did so in 2012

== Seeds ==
1. (United Kingdom) Fred Perry (champion)
2. (Germany) Gottfried von Cramm (final)
3. (Australia) Adrian Quist (quarterfinals)
4. (United States) Wilmer Allison (quarterfinals)
5. (United States) Don Budge (semifinals)
6. (Australia) Jack Crawford (quarterfinals)
7. (United Kingdom) Bunny Austin (semifinals)
8. (United States) Bryan Grant (quarterfinals)

Click on the seed number of a player to go to their draw section.

== Draw ==
Key

- Q = Qualifier
- WC = Wild card
- LL = Lucky loser
- Alt = Alternate
- ITF = ITF entry
- PR = Protected ranking
- SR = Special ranking
- SE = Special exempt
- JE = Junior exempt
- JR = Junior Accelerator Programme entrant
- CO = College Accelerator Programme entrant
- NG = Next Gen Accelerator Program entrant
- w/o = Walkover
- r = Retired
- d = Defaulted

=== Finals ===
Quarterfinals
1	(United Kingdom) Fred Perry	6	6	6
8	(United States) Bryan Grant	4	3	1
3	(Australia) Adrian Quist	2	4	4
5	(United States) Don Budge	6	6	6
7	(United Kingdom) Bunny Austin	6	6	7
4	(United States) Wilmer Allison	1	4	5
6	(Australia) Jack Crawford	1	5	4
2	(Germany) Gottfried von Cramm	6	7	6

Semifinals
1	(United Kingdom) Fred Perry	5	6	6	6
5	(United States) Don Budge	7	4	3	4
7	(United Kingdom) Bunny Austin	6	3	6	3
2	(Germany) Gottfried von Cramm	8	6	2	6

Final
1	(United Kingdom) Fred Perry	6	6	6
2	(Germany) Gottfried von Cramm	1	1	0

=== Top half ===
==== Section 1 ====
First round
1	(United Kingdom) Fred Perry	6	6	6
(United States) Gerry Stratford	4	3	1
(United Kingdom) Jimmy Reddall	8	10	5	3
(Thailand) Kasom Chatikavanij	10	8	7	6
Q	(United Kingdom) Roland Morton	3	6	2
(United States) John Van Ryn	6	8	6
(United Kingdom) David Williams	2	0	2
(Netherlands) Hendrik Timmer	6	6	6
(Kingdom of Yugoslavia) Franjo Kukuljević	6	5	4
(New Zealand) Cam Malfroy	8	7	6
(United Kingdom) Jack Lysaght	6	6	6
Q	(United Kingdom) John Anderson	0	2	3
(France) Jacques Jamain
(France) Jean Borotra	w/o
(United Kingdom) Bob Tinkler	6	6	3	2	2
Q	(United Kingdom) Claude Lister	2	3	6	6	6

Second round
1	(United Kingdom) F Perry	6	6	6
(Thailand) K Chatikavanij	3	2	2
(United States) J Van Ryn	6	8	6
(Netherlands) H Timmer	4	6	3
(New Zealand) C Malfroy	6	8	9	6
(United Kingdom) J Lysaght	3	6	11	2
(France) J Jamain	7	6	6
Q	(United Kingdom) C Lister	5	2	3

Third round
1	(United Kingdom) F Perry	6	6	6
(United States) J Van Ryn	3	2	0
(New Zealand) C Malfroy	6	6	7
(France) J Jamain	0	4	5

Fourth round
1	(United Kingdom) F Perry	6	6	6
(New Zealand) C Malfroy	2	2	4

==== Section 2 ====
First round
8	(United States) Bryan Grant	5	3	7	6	6
(Germany) Henner Henkel	7	6	5	4	2
(United Kingdom) Arnold England	4	4	1
(United Kingdom) Murray Deloford	6	6	6
(United Kingdom) Ted Avory	5	1	6	6	6
(United Kingdom) Henry Billington	7	6	4	1	3
(Switzerland) Boris Maneff	7	9	1	6
Q	(Republic of China (1912–1949)) Ho Jin	5	7	6	1
(United Kingdom) George Godsell	5	4	0^{r}
(France) Pierre Henri Landry	7	6	0
(Australia) Vivian McGrath	8	6	9
(Republic of Ireland) Henry Purcell	6	0	7
(Belgium) Léopold de Borman	2	2	6	6	6
(United States) Bill Robertson	6	6	3	4	4
(Republic of China (1912–1949)) Choy Wai-Chuen	0	6	1	4
(Argentina) Lucilo del Castillo	6	1	6	6

Second round
8	(United States) B Grant	4	6	6	6
(United Kingdom) M Deloford	6	2	2	1
(United Kingdom) E Avory	4	6	6	8
(Switzerland) B Maneff	6	4	4	6
(France) PH Landry	7	4	3	1
(Australia) V McGrath	5	6	6	6
(Belgium) L de Borman	1	6	2	6	4
(Argentina) L del Castillo	6	4	6	4	6

Third round
8	(United States) B Grant	6	6	6
(United Kingdom) E Avory	4	2	4
(Australia) V McGrath	6	2	6	12
(Argentina) L del Castillo	4	6	3	10

Fourth round
8	(United States) B Grant	6	6	6
(Australia) V McGrath	3	4	0

==== Section 3 ====
First round
3	(Australia) Adrian Quist	6	6	6
(United Kingdom) Norman Taylor	2	0	4
(Republic of Ireland) George Lyttleton-Rogers	3	6	1	1
(Switzerland) Max Ellmer	6	3	6	6
(Netherlands) Tod Hughan	1	2	3
(Japan) Eikishi Ito	6	6	6
(Austria) Adam Baworowski	3	6	6	2	3
(Norway) Johan Haanes	6	3	4	6	6
(France) Yvon Petra	6	6	6
(United Kingdom) Donald MacPhail	4	2	4
(Kingdom of Yugoslavia) Josip Palada	w/o
(India) Man-Mohan Bhandari
(United Kingdom) Nigel Sharpe	6	6	6
(United States) Hal Surface	4	2	1
(United Kingdom) Don Butler	7	6	6
(Canada) Laird Watt	5	2	3

Second round
3	(Australia) A Quist	8	6	6
(Switzerland) M Ellmer	6	3	3
(Japan) E Ito	6	6	6
(Norway) J Haanes	2	2	2
(France) Y Petra	6	6	6
(India) M-M Bhandari	3	3	2
(United Kingdom) N Sharpe	5	6	6	2	8
(United Kingdom) D Butler	7	3	4	6	10

Third round
3	(Australia) A Quist	6	6	6
(Japan) E Ito	0	0	3
(France) Y Petra	6	6	0	6
(United Kingdom) D Butler	3	8	6	8

Fourth round
3	(Australia) A Quist	6	7	9
(United Kingdom) D Butler	3	5	7

==== Section 4 ====
First round
5	(United States) Don Budge	6	6	6
(United Kingdom) Harold Hare	1	1	4
(United Kingdom) Ian Collins	6	6	6
Q	(United Kingdom) Stanley Stewart	4	3	2
(United Kingdom) Dickie Ritchie	7	6	6	0	0
(France) Jacques Brugnon	5	4	8	6	6
(United Kingdom) Laddie Wheatcroft	1	8	6	1
(France) Jean Lesueur	6	10	4	6
(United Kingdom) Pat Hughes	9	6	3	6	8
(Republic of China (1912–1949)) Kho Sin-Kie	11	4	6	3	6
(Greece) Georgios Nikolaides	5	2	5
(United Kingdom) Guy Cooper	7	6	7
(Czechoslovakia) Josef Caska	8	6	1	6
(United Kingdom) Henry Burrows	6	2	6	1
Q	(United Kingdom) Leslie Newman	6	6	5	0
Q	(Australia) Alan Coldham	4	8	7	6

Second round
5	(United States) D Budge	6	6	6
(United Kingdom) I Collins	2	2	1
(France) J Brugnon	7	3	6	5	0^{r}
(France) J Lesueur	5	6	4	7	1
(United Kingdom) P Hughes	6	5	6	0^{r}
(United Kingdom) G Cooper	3	7	2
(Czechoslovakia) J Caska	6	6	6
Q	(Australia) A Coldham	2	1	1

Third round
5	(United States) D Budge	6	6	6
(France) J Lesueur	1	1	1
(United Kingdom) G Cooper	1	1	6	3
(Czechoslovakia) J Caska	6	6	2	6

Fourth round
5	(United States) D Budge	6	6	6
(Czechoslovakia) J Caska	3	0	4

=== Bottom half ===
==== Section 5 ====
First round
(Switzerland) Charles Aeschlimann	1	1	2
(New Zealand) Buster Andrews	6	6	6
(France) Paul Féret	6	8	8
(United Kingdom) John Olliff	4	6	6
(France) André Martin-Legeay	7	2	6	7
(United Kingdom) Herman David	5	6	4	5
(Czechoslovakia) Josef Šíba	6	6	6
(Republic of China (1912–1949)) Lum Pao-Hua	2	2	2
(France) Bernard Destremau	3	4	6	6	6
Q	(United Kingdom) John Comery	6	6	1	0	3
(Austria) Georg von Metaxa	10	2	3	4
(United Kingdom) Raymond Tuckey	8	6	6	6
(Australia) Cliff Sproule	6	6	4	6
(United Kingdom) Colin Ritchie	4	4	6	3
(South Africa) Pat Spence	7	0	3	1
7	(United Kingdom) Bunny Austin	5	6	6	6

Second round
(New Zealand) E Andrews	6	3	4
(France) P Féret	3	6	6
(France) A Martin-Legeay	3	6	6	6
(Czechoslovakia) J Šíba	6	4	4	1
(France) B Destremau	5	6	5	2
(United Kingdom) R Tuckey	7	3	7	6
(Australia) C Sproule	3	4	1
7	(United Kingdom) H Austin	6	6	6

Third round
(France) P Féret	1	6	6
(France) A Martin-Legeay	6	8	8
(United Kingdom) R Tuckey	2	1	3
7	(United Kingdom) H Austin	6	6	6

Fourth round
(France) A Martin-Legeay	4	1	2
7	(United Kingdom) H Austin	6	6	6

==== Section 6 ====
First round
(United Kingdom) Pat Sherwood	6	3	3	4
(Germany) Kay Lund	2	6	6	6
(Denmark) Helge Plougmann	4	4	2
(United Kingdom) Jimmy Jones	6	6	6
(Greece) Lazaros Stalios	2	2	2
(France) Pierre Pellizza	6	6	6
(United Kingdom) Walter Michelmore	6	2	6	6
(Monaco) Vladimir Landau	4	6	4	3
(Netherlands) Josef Knottenbelt	4	3	2
(United Kingdom) Eric Peters	6	6	6
(Belgium) Jack Van den Eynde	6	6	6	6
(United Kingdom) Jack Harrison	8	0	3	3
(United Kingdom) Edmund David	3	1	7	2
(United States) David Jones	6	6	5	6
(United Kingdom) Bob Mulliken	4	4	3
4	(United States) Wilmer Allison	6	6	6

Second round
(Germany) K Lund	3	6	3	2
(United Kingdom) C Jones	6	4	6	6
(France) P Pellizza	6	6	6
(United Kingdom) W Michelmore	0	1	0
(United Kingdom) E Peters	6	2	5	2
(Belgium) J Van den Eynde	3	6	7	6
(United States) D Jones	12	3	4
4	(United States) W Allison	14	6	6

Third round
(United Kingdom) C Jones	7	7	6
(France) P Pellizza	5	5	2
(Belgium) J Van den Eynde	6	5	5
4	(United States) W Allison	8	7	7

Fourth round
(United Kingdom) C Jones	8	4	6	5
4	(United States) W Allison	10	6	1	7

==== Section 7 ====
First round
(Switzerland) Hector Fisher	6	6	7
(Hungary) Emil Gábori	4	2	5
(United Kingdom) Frank Wilde	6	2	4	6
(New Zealand) Alan Stedman	4	6	6	8
(United States) Merrimon Cuninggim	1	2	8	6	3
(Netherlands) Hans van Swol	6	6	6	3	6
(United States) Bill Breese	4	1	1
(United Kingdom) Harry Lee	6	6	6
(France) Antoine Gentien	w/o
(United Kingdom) Richard Turnbull
(United Kingdom) Kenneth Gandar-Dower	6	4	6	6
(Republic of Ireland) George McVeagh	1	6	3	1
(United Kingdom) Charles Hare	6	6	6
(Poland) Józef Hebda	4	2	4
(No citizenship) Daniel Prenn	1	3	4
6	(Australia) Jack Crawford	6	6	6

Second round
(Switzerland) H Fisher	1	1	2
(New Zealand) A Stedman	6	6	6
(Netherlands) A van Swol	2	3	4
(United Kingdom) H Lee	6	6	6
(United Kingdom) R Turnbull	6	4	0
(United Kingdom) K Gandar-Dower	8	6	6
(United Kingdom) C Hare	3	2	6
6	(Australia) J Crawford	6	6	8

Third round
(New Zealand) A Stedman	3	4	4
(United Kingdom) H Lee	6	6	6
(United Kingdom) K Gandar-Dower	1	2	3
6	(Australia) J Crawford	6	6	6

Fourth round
(United Kingdom) H Lee	5	4	7
6	(Australia) J Crawford	7	6	9

==== Section 8 ====
First round
(Argentina) Adriano Zappa	1	3	4
(Spain) Enrique Maier	6	6	6
(United Kingdom) Charles Kingsley	6	2	3	0
Q	(United Kingdom) Henry Weatherall	2	6	6	6
(United Kingdom) Eric Filby	0	6	2	7	4
(United Kingdom) Ronnie Shayes	6	3	6	5	6
(Kingdom of Yugoslavia) Franjo Punčec	w/o
(United Kingdom) Bobby Meredith
(United Kingdom) Laurie Shaffi	3	0	4
(United States) Gene Mako	6	6	6
(Norway) Fritz Jenssen	4	3	2
(France) Christian Boussus	6	6	6
(Czechoslovakia) Ladislav Hecht	4	6	6	6
(Canada) Robert Murray	6	3	4	2
Q	(United Kingdom) Gerry France	2	0	1
2	(Germany) Gottfried von Cramm	6	6	6

Second round
(Spain) E Maier	6	6	6
Q	(United Kingdom) H Weatherall	4	3	1
(United Kingdom) R Shayes	4	7	5
(United Kingdom) G Meredith	6	9	7
(United States) G Mako	w/o
(France) C Boussus
(Czechoslovakia) L Hecht	4	3	4
2	(Germany) G von Cramm	6	6	6

Third round
(Spain) E Maier	6	6	6
(United Kingdom) G Meredith	1	2	2
(France) C Boussus	4	3	2
2	(Germany) G von Cramm	6	6	6

Fourth round
(Spain) E Maier	8	2	6	2
2	(Germany) G von Cramm	10	6	2	6

Preceded by 1936 French Championships	Grand Slams; Men's Singles	Succeeded by 1936 U.S. Championships
