= 1939 Wimbledon Championships – Men's singles =

Men's singles
- 1939 Wimbledon Championships

Final
- Champion: (United States) Bobby Riggs
- Runner-up: (United States) Elwood Cooke
- Score: 2–6, 8–6, 3–6, 6–3, 6–2

Details
- Draw: 128 (10Q)
- Seeds: 8

Events
Singles	men	women		boys	girls
Doubles	men	women	mixed	boys	girls
- Wimbledon Championships

Second-seeded Bobby Riggs defeated Elwood Cooke in the final, 2–6, 8–6, 3–6, 6–3, 6–2 to win the gentlemen's singles tennis title at the 1939 Wimbledon Championships. Don Budge was the defending champion, but was ineligible to compete after turning professional at the end of the 1938 season. Three-time finalist Gottfried von Cramm, who had won the Queen's Club Championships the week before, stated that his absence was because he had not entered, denying that he had been refused entry due to his 1938 indecency conviction.

It would be the last Wimbledon tournament for seven years until 1946 due to World War II.

== Seeds ==
1. (United Kingdom) Bunny Austin (quarterfinals)
2. (United States) Bobby Riggs (champion)
3. (United States) Don McNeil (second round)
4. (Kingdom of Yugoslavia) Franjo Punčec (semifinals)
5. (Germany) Henner Henkel (semifinals)
6. (United States) Elwood Cooke (final)
7. (Czechoslovakia) Roderich Menzel (second round)
8. (Poland) Ignacy Tłoczyński (third round)

Click on the seed number of a player to go to their draw section.

== Draw ==
Key

- Q = Qualifier
- WC = Wild card
- LL = Lucky loser
- Alt = Alternate
- ITF = ITF entry
- PR = Protected ranking
- SR = Special ranking
- SE = Special exempt
- JE = Junior exempt
- JR = Junior Accelerator Programme entrant
- CO = College Accelerator Programme entrant
- NG = Next Gen Accelerator Program entrant
- w/o = Walkover
- r = Retired
- d = Defaulted

=== Finals ===
Quarterfinals
1	(United Kingdom) Bunny Austin	3	0	1
6	(United States) Elwood Cooke	6	6	6
(Kingdom of Yugoslavia) Franjo Kukuljević	1	3	2
5	(Germany) Henner Henkel	6	6	6
(United States) Gene Smith	0	2	2
4	(Kingdom of Yugoslavia) Franjo Punčec	6	6	6
(India) Ghaus Mohammad	2	2	2
2	(United States) Bobby Riggs	6	6	6

Semifinals
6	(United States) Elwood Cooke	6	4	6	6
5	(Germany) Henner Henkel	3	6	4	4
4	(Kingdom of Yugoslavia) Franjo Punčec	2	3	4
2	(United States) Bobby Riggs	6	6	6

Final
6	(United States) Elwood Cooke	6	6	6	3	2
2	(United States) Bobby Riggs	2	8	3	6	6

=== Top half ===
==== Section 1 ====
First round
1	(United Kingdom) Bunny Austin	6	6	12
(Hungary) József Asbóth	1	4	10
LL	(United Kingdom) Maurice Lucking	5	1	5
(United States) Owen Anderson	7	6	7
(Czechoslovakia) Jaroslav Drobný	6	6	6
(Republic of China (1912–1949)) Ho Jin	1	2	4
Q	(United Kingdom) Henry Weatherall	6	6	7
(Australia) Garton Hone	4	3	5
(United Kingdom) Jack Darkins	8	6	8
(United Kingdom) Douglas Snart	6	4	6
(Romania) Cristea Caralulis	4	2	9	0
(United Kingdom) Don Butler	6	6	7	6
Q	(United Kingdom) Bert Whitney	2	3	2
(Belgium) Jack Van den Eynde	6	6	6
(Egypt) Andre Najar	3	3	1
(Germany) Rolf Göpfert	6	6	6

Second round
1	(United Kingdom) H Austin	6	6	6
(United States) O Anderson	3	4	4
(Czechoslovakia) J Drobný	6	6	6
Q	(United Kingdom) H Weatherall	2	2	4
(United Kingdom) J Darkins	7	6	3	1
(United Kingdom) D Butler	9	4	6	6
(Belgium) J Van den Eynde	5	4	2
(Germany) R Göpfert	7	6	6

Third round
1	(United Kingdom) H Austin	7	9	0
(Czechoslovakia) J Drobný	5	7	0^{r}
(United Kingdom) D Butler	4	6	4	6	6
(Germany) R Göpfert	6	2	6	3	3

Fourth round
1	(United Kingdom) H Austin	8	6	6
(United Kingdom) D Butler	6	4	4

==== Section 2 ====
First round
6	(United States) Elwood Cooke	1	6	6	6
(France) Christian Boussus	6	4	0	3
(Switzerland) Jost Spitzer	3	6	1	1
(United Kingdom) George Godsell	6	4	6	6
(United Kingdom) Cliff Hovell	0	7	6	8	6
Q	(United Kingdom) Headley Baxter	6	9	0	6	3
(India) Iftikar Ahmed	3	7	8
(Republic of Ireland) George Lyttleton-Rogers	6	9	10
(Germany) Helmuth Gulcz	2	2	4
(New Zealand) Dewar Brown	6	6	6
(United Kingdom) Ian Collins	6	6	6
(United Kingdom) Bob Higgin	1	2	2
(United Kingdom) John Olliff	3	4	6	6	0
(No citizenship) Daniel Prenn	6	6	1	4	0^{r}
LL	(India) Janmeja Charanjiva	2	4	1
(Switzerland) Boris Maneff	6	6	6

Second round
6	(United States) E Cooke	6	7	7
(United Kingdom) G Godsell	1	5	5
(United Kingdom) C Hovell	2	8	6
(Republic of Ireland) G Lyttleton-Rogers	6	10	8
(New Zealand) D Brown	3	6	4	1
(United Kingdom) I Collins	6	1	6	6
(United Kingdom) J Olliff	6	6	6
(Switzerland) B Maneff	2	4	4

Third round
6	(United States) E Cooke	7	6	6
(Republic of Ireland) G Lyttleton-Rogers	5	1	4
(United Kingdom) I Collins	6	7	2	4
(United Kingdom) J Olliff	8	5	6	6

Fourth round
6	(United States) E Cooke	6	6	6
(United Kingdom) J Olliff	1	1	4

==== Section 3 ====
First round
3	(United States) Don McNeill	6	6	6
(Hungary) Kálmán Aschner	1	1	0
(Kingdom of Yugoslavia) Franjo Kukuljević	6	4	6	6
(Netherlands) Tod Hughan	1	6	1	0
(United Kingdom) Jimmy Jones	6	6	6
(United Kingdom) Tommy Anderson	1	0	3
(Republic of Ireland) Raymond Egan	7	6	4	2	3
(Republic of China (1912–1949)) Choy Wai-Chuen	5	1	6	6	6
(United Kingdom) Herman David	6	6	5	6
(United Kingdom) Gordon Fitt	2	1	7	3
(New Zealand) Dennis Coombe	4	12	3	1
(Kingdom of Yugoslavia) Dragutin Mitić	6	11	6	6
(Argentina) Hector Etchart	7	6	6
Q	(United Kingdom) Brian Royds	5	1	2
(United Kingdom) Arnold England	5	6	4
(United Kingdom) Murray Deloford	7	8	6

Second round
3	(United States) D McNeill	4	5	1
(Kingdom of Yugoslavia) F Kukuljević	6	7	6
(United Kingdom) C Jones	3	6	2	4
(Republic of China (1912–1949)) W-C Choy	6	2	6	6
(United Kingdom) H David	4	5	4
(Kingdom of Yugoslavia) D Mitić	6	7	6
(Argentina) H Etchart	4	3	6	2
(United Kingdom) M Deloford	6	6	2	6

Third round
(Kingdom of Yugoslavia) F Kukuljević	6	7	6
(Republic of China (1912–1949)) W-C Choy	4	5	4
(Kingdom of Yugoslavia) D Mitić	5	4	6	6	3
(United Kingdom) M Deloford	7	6	2	2	6

Fourth round
(Kingdom of Yugoslavia) F Kukuljević	6	6	6
(United Kingdom) M Deloford	4	3	1

==== Section 4 ====
First round
5	(Germany) Henner Henkel	9	6	6
(United Kingdom) Jack Piercy	7	0	0
(Hungary) György Dallos	3	9	4	4
(United Kingdom) John Comery	6	7	6	6
(Switzerland) Hans Pfaff	6	4	6	1	6
(India) Dilip Bose	2	6	1	6	2
(United Kingdom) Brian Sturgeon	1	2	6	5
(United Kingdom) Laurie Shaffi	6	6	3	7
(France) Jacques Brugnon	6	6	3	6
(United Kingdom) Frank Wilde	1	3	6	3
(United Kingdom) Reginald Bessemer-Clark	5	1	6
(United Kingdom) Bob Mulliken	7	6	8
(Poland) Adam Baworowski	6	4	5	5
(Italy) Giorgio de Stefani	3	6	7	7
(Belgium) Léopold de Borman	6	7	3	0	7
Q	(United Kingdom) Colin Ritchie	4	5	6	6	5

Second round
5	(Germany) H Henkel	6	6	6
(United Kingdom) J Comery	1	2	4
(Switzerland) H Pfaff	6	3	3	4
(United Kingdom) L Shaffi	3	6	6	6
(France) J Brugnon	6	6	6
(United Kingdom) R Mulliken	4	2	4
(Italy) G de Stefani	6	10	6
(Belgium) L de Borman	2	8	1

Third round
5	(Germany) H Henkel	6	4	6	6
(United Kingdom) L Shaffi	4	6	4	1
(France) J Brugnon	6	6	6	6
(Italy) G de Stefani	4	4	8	4

Fourth round
5	(Germany) H Henkel	6	6	6
(France) J Brugnon	1	3	0

=== Bottom half ===
==== Section 5 ====
First round
(Hungary) Emil Gábori	6	6	6
(United Kingdom) Jack Harrison	4	2	2
(Republic of China (1912–1949)) Kho Sin-Kie	w/o
(New Zealand) Jack Gunn
(United Kingdom) Guy Cooper	5	4	3
(Italy) Vanni Canepele	7	6	6
(India) Yeswanath-Rao Savoor	7	9	6
(Belgium) Pierre Geelhand de Merxem	5	7	1
(Czechoslovakia) František Cejnar	6	9	6
(France) Antoine Gentien	1	7	2
LL	(United Kingdom) Malcolm Maclagan	2	5	7
(Hungary) Mihály Csikós	6	7	9
(New Zealand) Buster Andrews	6	2	3	4
(United States) Gene Smith	3	6	6	6
(United Kingdom) Eric Peters	1	2	2
7	(Czechoslovakia) Roderich Menzel	6	6	6

Second round
(Hungary) E Gábori	7	9	5	6
(New Zealand) J Gunn	5	7	7	2
(Italy) G Canepele	6	6	7
(India) Y-R Savoor	2	4	5
(Czechoslovakia) F Cejnar	6	7	6
(Hungary) M Csikos	4	5	3
(United States) E Smith	6	3	6	7
7	(Czechoslovakia) R Menzel	1	6	3	5

Third round
(Hungary) E Gábori	6	6	2	6
(Italy) G Canepele	4	1	6	2
(Czechoslovakia) F Cejnar	3	2	7	6	1
(United States) E Smith	6	6	5	1	6

Fourth round
(Hungary) E Gábori	0	4	3
(United States) E Smith	6	6	6

==== Section 6 ====
First round
(Australia) Alan Coldham	6	6	6
(United Kingdom) Gwyn Tuckett	3	4	3
(United Kingdom) Dermot Muspratt	4	3	4
(Argentina) Alejo Russell	6	6	6
(United Kingdom) Harold Hare	6	3	6	6	3
(Romania) Arnulf Schmidt	2	6	8	0	6
(United Kingdom) Eric Filby	8	3	6	1	5
(United Kingdom) Tony Mottram	6	6	4	6	7
(United Kingdom) Roland Morton	6	3	6	2	1
(Switzerland) Hector Fisher	3	6	3	6	6
(United Kingdom) Bobby Meredith	2	1	3
(United Kingdom) Donald MacPhail	6	6	6
(United Kingdom) Henry Billington	3	2	9
(United Kingdom) Pat Sherwood	6	6	11
(New Zealand) Neil Edwards	2	2	3
4	(Kingdom of Yugoslavia) Franjo Punčec	6	6	6

Second round
(Australia) A Coldham	8	4	9	2
(Argentina) A Russell	6	6	11	6
(Romania) A Schmidt	6	3	1	1
(United Kingdom) A Mottram	3	6	6	6
(Switzerland) H Fisher	6	1	2	0
(United Kingdom) D MacPhail	3	6	6	6
(United Kingdom) P Sherwood	3	1	3
4	(Kingdom of Yugoslavia) F Punčec	6	6	6

Third round
(Argentina) A Russell	10	6	6
(United Kingdom) A Mottram	8	4	1
(United Kingdom) D MacPhail	3	3	5
4	(Kingdom of Yugoslavia) F Punčec	6	6	7

Fourth round
(Argentina) A Russell	3	6	1
4	(Kingdom of Yugoslavia) F Punčec	6	8	6

==== Section 7 ====
First round
(Monaco) Gaston Médécin	7	6	2	1
(Denmark) Helge Plougmann	9	1	6	6
(Hungary) Ottó Szigeti	12	6	6
(United States) Bill Robertson	10	4	4
(United Kingdom) Jack Lysaght	4	3	3
(Netherlands) Hans van Swol	6	6	6
(Switzerland) Max Ellmer	6	6	6
(Romania) Alexandru Hamburger	1	0	3
(United Kingdom) Claude Lister	1	6	3	1
(United Kingdom) Bob Tinkler	6	4	6	6
(India) Ghaus Mohammad	6	6	6
(United Kingdom) Norman Taylor	3	1	2
Q	(United Kingdom) Dennis Slack	6	6	5	7	6
(United Kingdom) Henry Burrows	8	4	7	5	3
Q	(India) Chuni Savara	2	0	3
8	(Poland) Ignacy Tłoczyński	6	6	6

Second round
(Denmark) H Plougmann	3	3	5
(Hungary) O Szigeti	6	6	7
(Netherlands) A van Swol	6	6	4	6
(Switzerland) M Ellmer	2	3	6	4
(United Kingdom) B Tinkler	4	3	2
(India) G Mohammad	6	6	6
Q	(United Kingdom) D Slack	3	1	1
8	(Poland) I Tłoczyński	6	6	6

Third round
(Hungary) O Szigeti	8	6	6
(Netherlands) A van Swol	6	4	4
(India) G Mohammad	6	6	6
8	(Poland) I Tłoczyński	0	3	4

Fourth round
(Hungary) O Szigeti	4	16	6	3	4
(India) G Mohammad	6	14	2	6	6

==== Section 8 ====
First round
(Germany) Georg von Metaxa	2	4	6	4
(France) Robert Abdesselam	6	6	3	6
(Czechoslovakia) Josef Šíba	6	6	6
(South Africa) Eustace Fannin	3	2	1
(United Kingdom) Ronnie Shayes	2	6	7	4	6
(Greece) Georgios Nikolaides	6	2	5	6	4
Q	(United Kingdom) Jack Warboys	0	0	0
(Kingdom of Yugoslavia) Josip Palada	6	6	6
(United Kingdom) Edmund David	2	5	5
(United Kingdom) Harry Lee	6	7	7
(New Zealand) Cam Malfroy	6	6	2	4	6
(United Kingdom) Nigel Sharpe	4	3	6	6	0
(United Kingdom) Ted Avory	6	1	6	4	6
(United Kingdom) Derrick Leyland	3	6	4	6	4
Q	(India) Jagan Dhamija	3	0	4
2	(United States) Bobby Riggs	6	6	6

Second round
(France) R Abdesselam	5	1	4
(Czechoslovakia) J Šíba	7	6	6
(United Kingdom) R Shayes	6	3	9	2	8
(Kingdom of Yugoslavia) J Palada	4	6	7	6	6
(United Kingdom) H Lee	2	4	5
(New Zealand) C Malfroy	6	6	7
(United Kingdom) E Avory	4	4	2
2	(United States) R Riggs	6	6	6

Third round
(Czechoslovakia) J Šíba	5	4	7
(United Kingdom) R Shayes	7	6	9
(New Zealand) C Malfroy	6	9	2
2	(United States) R Riggs	8	11	6

Fourth round
(United Kingdom) R Shayes	5	8	4	3
2	(United States) R Riggs	7	6	6	6

Preceded by 1939 French Championships	Grand Slams; Men's Singles	Succeeded by 1939 U.S. Championships
