= Southdean Covered Court Championships =

Defunct tennis tournament
- Founded: 1934; 91 years ago
- Abolished: 1952; 73 years ago
- Editions: 12
- Location: Middleton-on-Sea, West Sussex, England
- Venue: Southdean Sports Club
- Surface: Wood

The Southdean Covered Court Championships was an indoor tennis tournament established in 1934 at the Southdean Sports Club, Middleton-on-Sea, West Sussex, England. The championships ran until 1952 when they were discontinued.

== History ==
In 1922 Sir Walter Aston Blount, 10th Baronet created a New City holiday resort in the former seaplane factory south of the church. One of the hangars accommodated a dance hall and another indoor tennis courts; there were also outdoor tennis courts, a putting green.

The New City had its own hotel accommodation, dairy, farm, ice generating plant, and mineral water factory, besides a laundry, hairdressing rooms, and lending library. By 1934 the New City had become the Southdean hotel and sports club, which in 1937 was open to nonresidents, and which by then could offer squash courts and a sea-water swimming pool. In 1934 the Southdean Covered Court Championships was established at the Southdean Sports Club. The championships were staged through till 1952 before being discontinued.

== Venue ==
The Southdean Sports Club was founded in 1934. In 1953 the club's facilities included two covered courts and two badminton courts for indoor use plus six grass courts, and four hard clay courts for outdoor tennis. In 1997 Southdean Sports Club was renamed to the Middleton Sports Club.

== Finals ==
=== Men's singles ===
(Incomplete roll):

Year	Winner	Finalist	Score
1936	(United Kingdom) Frank Wilde	(United Kingdom) Henry Billington	8-6, 6-0.
1937	(United Kingdom) Frank Wilde (2)	(United Kingdom) Murray Deloford	6-3, 6-8, 6-3.
1938	(Republic of China (1912–1949)) Choy Wai-Chuen	(United Kingdom) Henry Billington	5-7, 6-3, 6-4.
1940/1945	Not held (due to World War Ii)		
1949	(United Kingdom) Paddy Roberts	(United Kingdom) Howard Walton	6-4, 1-6, 6-4.
1950	(United Kingdom) Gerry Oakley	(United Kingdom) Derrick Leyland	8-6, 6-3.
1951	(United Kingdom) Gerry Oakley (2)	(United Kingdom) George Godsell	10-12, 8-6, ret..
1952	(Poland) Ignacy Tłoczyński	(United Kingdom) Gerry Oakley	9-7, 6-4.

=== Women's singles ===
(Incomplete roll)

Year	Winner	Finalist	Score
1936	(United Kingdom) Audrey Wright	(United Kingdom) Mary Whitmarsh	6-3, 0-6, 10-8
1937	(United Kingdom) Valerie Scott	(United Kingdom) Audrey Wright	4-6, 6-4, 6-4
1938	(United Kingdom) Gladys Southwell	(United Kingdom) Rosemary Thomas	7-5, 6-4
1939	(United Kingdom) Freda James Hammersley	(United Kingdom) Thelma Jarvis	7-5, 6-3
1940/1945	Not held (due to World War II)		
1949	(United Kingdom) Kay Stammers Menzies	(United Kingdom) Jean Walker-Smith	4-6, 6-3, 6-2
1950	(United Kingdom) Betty Smith Coutts	(United Kingdom) Gladys Lines	6-2, 5-7, 7-5
1951	(United Kingdom) Angela Mortimer	(United Kingdom) Gay Moorhouse Chandler	6-2, 6-4
1952	(United Kingdom) Angela Mortimer (2)	(United Kingdom) Mary Harris	6-1, 6-1
