= 1939 French Championships – Men's singles =

Men's singles
- 1939 French Championships

Final
- Champion: (United States) Don McNeill
- Runner-up: (United States) Bobby Riggs
- Score: 7–5, 6–0, 6–3

Details
- Seeds: 2

Events
Singles	men	women
Doubles	men	women
- French Championships

Don McNeill defeated Bobby Riggs 7–5, 6–0, 6–3 in the final to win the men's singles tennis title at the 1939 French Championships.

== Seeds ==
The seeded players are listed below. Don McNeill is the champion; others show the round in which they were eliminated.

1. (United States) Bobby Riggs (finalist)
2. (Kingdom of Yugoslavia) Franjo Punčec (quarterfinals)

== Draw ==
=== Key ===
- Q = Qualifier
- WC = Wild card
- LL = Lucky loser
- r = Retired

=== Finals ===
Quarterfinals
1	(United States) Bobby Riggs	6	2	8	7
(Poland) Ignacy Tłoczyński	2	6	6	5
(Hungary) Ottó Szigeti	7	1	2	7	6
(France) Christian Boussus	5	6	6	5	4
(United States) Elwood Cooke	6	6	6
(United Kingdom) Henry Billington	4	4	1
(United States) Don McNeill	6	1	6	6
2	(Kingdom of Yugoslavia) Franjo Punčec	4	6	3	1

Semifinals
1	(United States) Bobby Riggs	6	6	6
(Hungary) Ottó Szigeti	3	0	4
(United States) Elwood Cooke	2	5	9	2
(United States) Don McNeill	6	7	7	6

Final
1	(United States) Bobby Riggs	5	0	3
(United States) Don McNeill	7	6	6

=== Earlier rounds ===
==== Section 1 ====
First round
1	(United States) Riggs	6	8	6	6
(France) Journu	4	10	4	2
(France) Terrier	3	5	3
(United Kingdom) Shayes	6	7	6
(France) Pellizza
(Belgium) Mouvet
(Belgium) De Borman	8	8	1
(France) Combemale	10	10	6
(Kingdom of Yugoslavia) Mitić	1	6	7	6
(France) Bolelli	6	3	5	1
(France) Billaudot	6	6	2	3	3
(France) Langanay	3	3	6	6	6
(Poland) Tłoczyński	6	6	6
Robinson	2	3	4
(Netherlands) Van Swol	6	3	6	4	6
(France) Abdesselam	4	6	3	6	8

Second round
1	(United States) Riggs	6	3	6	6
(United Kingdom) Shayes	4	6	3	3
(Belgium) Mouvet	4	1	4
(France) Combemale	6	6	6
(Kingdom of Yugoslavia) Mitić	7	6	6
(France) Langanay	5	1	3
(Poland) Tłoczyński	4	6	6	10
(France) Abdesselam	6	4	0	8

Third round
1	(United States) Riggs	6	6	6	8
(France) Combemale	8	4	4	6
(Kingdom of Yugoslavia) Mitić	0	4	6	0
(Poland) Tłoczyński	6	6	2	6

Quarterfinals
1	(United States) Riggs	6	2	8	7
(Poland) Tłoczyński	2	6	6	5

==== Section 2 ====
First round
(Hungary) Szigeti	6	6	6	6
(United Kingdom) Wilde	8	1	3	2
(France) Sanglier	2	2	6	1
(France) Jaquemet	6	6	3	6
(France) Feret	7	6	6	6
(United States) Robertson	9	2	2	3
(France) Lesueur	6	4	2
(Belgium) Geelhand De Merxem	8	6	6
(France) Glasser	3	6	4	3
(Republic of Ireland) Rogers Lyttelton	6	3	6	6
(France) Lecointre	1	1	3
(Kingdom of Yugoslavia) Pallada	6	6	6
(United States) Harris	9	0	2
(France) Boussus	11	6	6
(United States) Smith	3	4	6	6
(France) Dessair	6	6	2	8

Second round
(Hungary) Szigeti	6	6	6
(France) Jaquemet	2	4	4
(France) Feret	6	6	6
(Belgium) Geelhand De Merxem	2	2	2
(Republic of Ireland) Rogers Lyttelton	6	6	6
(Kingdom of Yugoslavia) Pallada	4	3	0
(France) Boussus	11	6	6
(France) Dessair	9	0	2

Third round
(Hungary) Szigeti	3	6	4	6	6
(France) Feret	6	3	6	4	1
(Republic of Ireland) Rogers Lyttelton	7	3	2
(France) Boussus	9	6	6

Quarterfinals
(Hungary) Szigeti	7	1	2	7	6
(France) Boussus	5	6	6	5	4

==== Section 3 ====
First round
(France) Rodel	9	2	1	4
(France) Gentien	7	6	6	6
(France) Rimet	2	1	4
(Kingdom of Yugoslavia) Kukuljević	6	6	6
(France) Bonte	0	3	3
(United Kingdom) Billington	6	6	6

Second round
(France) Gentien	0	7	3
(United States) Cooke	6	9	6
(France) Catteau	7	6	6	3	0
(Kingdom of Yugoslavia) Kukuljević	9	2	4	6	6
(Belgium) Van Den Eynde	2	4	6	6	8
(United Kingdom) Billington	6	6	2	4	10
(Monaco) Galeppe	1	4	1
(Hungary) Asbóth	6	6	6

Third round
(United States) Cooke	6	2
(Kingdom of Yugoslavia) Kukuljević	1	1	r
(United Kingdom) Billington	4	6	3	7	6
(Hungary) Asbóth	6	4	6	5	3

Quarterfinals
(United States) Cooke	6	6	6
(United Kingdom) Billington	4	4	1

==== Section 4 ====
First round
(France) Pellizza	6	1	3
(France) Destremau	8	6	6
(Argentina) Hauser	0	0	2
(France) Brugnon	6	6	6
(Poland) Baworowski	6	1	5	1
(United States) McNeill	2	6	7	6
(France) Chevallier	6	1	2	0
(France) Jamain	3	6	6	6

Second round
(France) Destremau	9	9	6
(France) Brugnon	7	7	0
(United States) McNeill	6	6	6
(France) Jamain	2	1	0
(Belgium) Lacroix	2	11	3	0
(Hungary) Gábory	6	9	6	6
(United Kingdom) Hare	2	5	4
2	(Kingdom of Yugoslavia) Punčec	6	7	6

Third round
(France) Destremau	2	6	3	6	2
(United States) McNeill	6	1	6	4	6
(Hungary) Gábory	4	3	2
2	(Kingdom of Yugoslavia) Punčec	6	6	6

Quarterfinals
(United States) McNeill	6	1	6	6
2	(Kingdom of Yugoslavia) Punčec	4	6	3	1

Preceded by 1939 Australian Championships – Men's singles	Grand Slam men's singles	Succeeded by 1939 Wimbledon Championships – Men's singles
