= Man-Mohan Bhandari =

Indian tennis player (born 1913)

- Country (sports): India
- Born: 26 February 1913; Lahore, India
- Turned pro: 1930 (ILTF tour)
- Retired: 1942

Singles
- Career record: 46–18
- Career titles: 1

Grand Slam singles results
- Wimbledon: 2R (1936)

Man-Mohan Bhandari (born 26 February 1913, date of death unknown) was an Indian tennis player. He competed at the Wimbledon Championships twice, in 1934 and 1936. He was active from 1930 to 1942 contesting 3 career singles finals and won 1 title.

== Career ==
Man-Mohan Bhandari was born in Lahore, India on 26 February 1913. In major tournaments he competed at the Wimbledon Championships in 1934 and 1936. At the 1934 Wimbledon Championships he lost in the first round to Swiss player Max Ellmer. At the 1936 Wimbledon Championships he reached progressed to the second round where he lost to Frenchman Yvon Petra.

Bhandari played his first tournament at the Calcutta South Club Invitation in 1930 where he reached the quarter finals, but lost to Jacques Brugnon. In 1932 he played at the Punjab University Tennis Championships where he progressed to the final and won that title. The same year he competed at the Indian International Championships where he reached the fourth round and lost to the American player Leonard Brooke Edwards.

In 1934 he travelled to England to take part in Wimbledon Championships that year, whilst there he also took part in a number of other tournaments. At the Southdean Hard Court Championships he was a losing semi finalist to compatriot Mohammed Sleem. He also played at the Tunbridge Wells Open where he reached the final, but was beaten by the South African player Vernon Kirby in straight sets.

Bhandari then played at the Cumberland Hard Court Championships where he also reached the final of that event, before losing to the World No 4 ranked player Bunny Austin. He played his final known singles tournament at the Parsi Gymkhana Open Tournament in 1942.

== Career finals ==
=== Singles (3), titles (1), runners up (2) ===
Category + (Titles)
Grand Slam/World Championship (0)
Important (0)
National (0)
Regular (1)

Titles by Surface
Clay – Outdoor (0)
Grass – Outdoor (1)
Hard – Outdoor (0)
Carpet – Indoor (0)
Wood – Indoor (0)

No	Result	Date	Tournament	Surface	Opponent	Score
1.	Win	23-Nov-1932	Punjab University Tennis Championships	Grass	(India) Sohan Lal	6–4, 6–2, 6–3.
1.	Loss	4‑Aug‑1934	Tunbridge Wells Open	Grass	(South Africa) Vernon Kirby	1–6, 2–6.
2.	Loss	22‑Sep‑1934	Cumberland Hard Court Championships	Clay	(United Kingdom) Bunny Austin	2–6, 1–6.

== Personal ==
Bhandari was educated at Central Model School and Government College, Lahore, India, and later attended Emmanuel College, Cambridge.
