= Elwood Cooke =

American tennis player

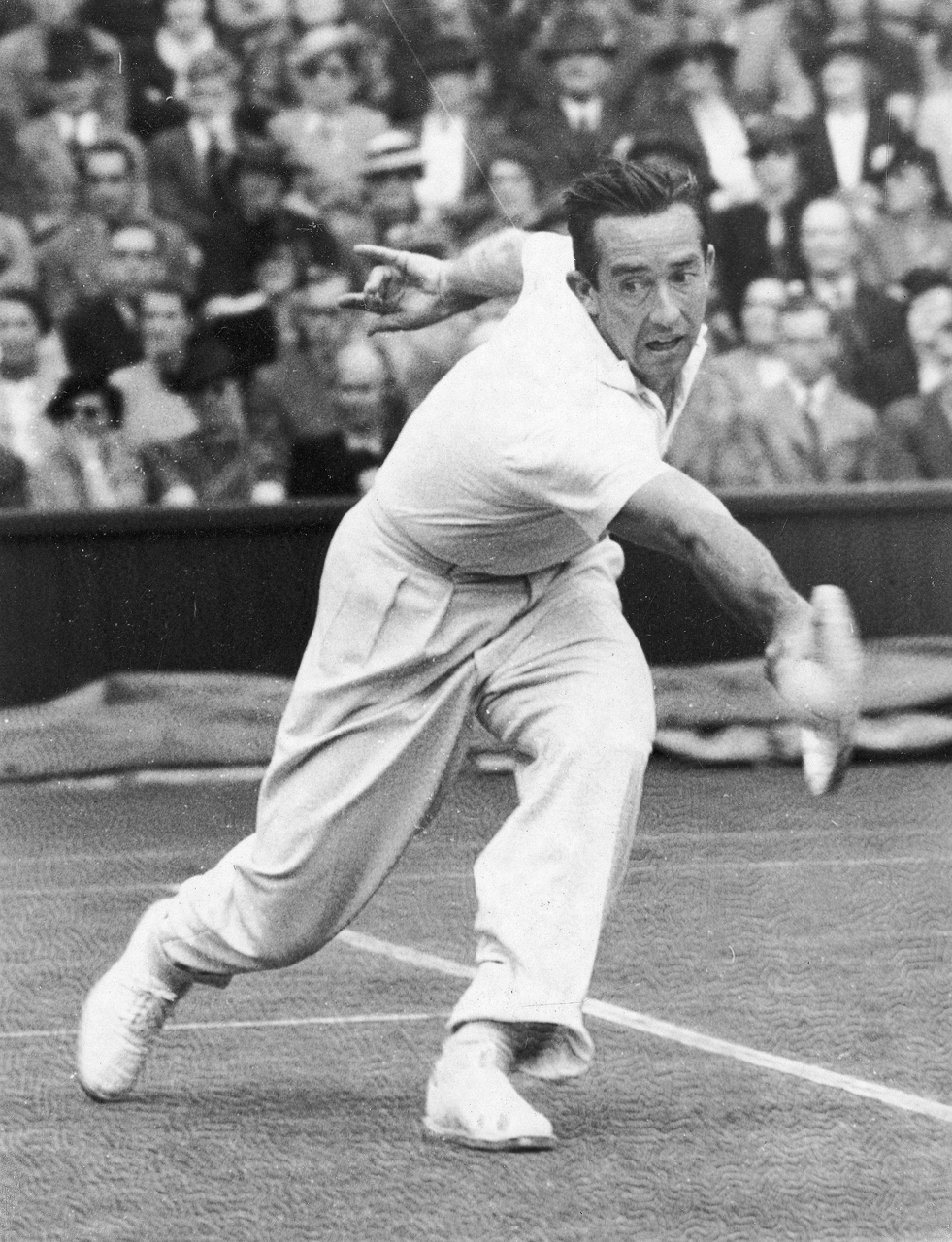
- Cooke at the 1939 Wimbledon Championships
- Full name: Elwood Thomas Cooke
- Country (sports): United States
- Born: July 5, 1913; Ogden, Utah, U.S.
- Died: April 16, 2004 (aged 90); Apopka, Florida, U.S.
- Turned pro: 1947 (amateur from 1935)
- Retired: 1949
- Plays: Right-handed (one-handed backhand)

Singles
- Highest ranking: No. 8 (1939, Gordon Lowe)

Grand Slam singles results
- French Open: SF (1939)
- Wimbledon: F (1939)
- US Open: SF (1945)

Other tournaments
- US Pro: QF (1947, 1948, 1949)

Doubles

Grand Slam doubles results
- Wimbledon: W (1939)

Mixed doubles

Grand Slam mixed doubles results
- French Open: W (1939)
- Wimbledon: SF (1939)
- US Open: F (1939)

Elwood Thomas Cooke (July 5, 1913 – April 16, 2004) was an amateur American tennis player in the 1930s and 1940s.

== Tennis career ==
Elwood Cooke started playing tennis before his junior year at Benson Polytechnic High School. He played for the school team in the Portland Interscholastic League, never losing in singles matches and finishing with the team in 2nd place in his junior and senior years.

Cooke was ranked in Top 10 in the United States in 1938 (ranked No. 7), 1939 (No. 6), 1940 (No. 9), and 1945 (No. 4), whilst reaching as high as world No. 8 in Gordon Lowe's amateur rankings for 1939.

At Wimbledon, Cooke reached the singles final in 1939 (beating Bunny Austin and Henner Henkel before falling to Bobby Riggs), but won the doubles title that year with Riggs. He was the U.S. Indoor Doubles champion with Riggs in 1940. Cooke reached the semifinals of the French Championships in 1939 (losing to Don McNeill) and the U.S. National Championships in 1945 (losing to Frank Parker). He reached the U. S. quarterfinals in 1940 and 1943.

At the Cincinnati Masters, he reached both the singles and the doubles final in 1945. He lost the singles final to future International Tennis Hall of Fame enshrinee Bill Talbert. In the Oregon State Tournament, he won the singles title in 1936. In the Pacific Northwest Sectional, he won the singles title in 1935 and 1936. He was a naval officer during World War II, and was married to International Tennis Hall of Famer Sarah Palfrey Cooke.

After he retired from tournament play, he was the head tennis professional at Sunningdale Country Club in Scarsdale, New York from 1961 to 1981.

== Personal life ==
He was married to American tennis player Sarah Palfrey from 1940 to 1949.

== Grand Slam finals ==
=== Singles (1 runner-up) ===
Result	Year	Championship	Surface	Opponent	Score
Loss	1939	Wimbledon	Grass	(United States) Bobby Riggs	6–2, 6–8, 6–3, 3–6, 2–6

=== Doubles (1 title) ===
Result	Year	Championship	Surface	Partner	Opponents	Score
Win	1939	Wimbledon	Grass	(United States) Bobby Riggs	(United Kingdom) Charles Hare (United Kingdom) Frank Wilde	6–3, 3–6, 6–3, 9–7

=== Mixed doubles (1 title, runner-up) ===
Result	Year	Championship	Surface	Partner	Opponents	Score
Win	1939	French Championships	Clay	(United States) Sarah Palfrey	(France) Simonne Mathieu (Socialist Federal Republic of Yugoslavia) Franjo Kukuljević	4–6, 6–1, 7–5
Loss	1939	U.S. Championships	Grass	(United States) Sarah Palfrey	(United States) Alice Marble (Australia) Harry Hopman	7–9, 1–6
