= Tunbridge Wells Open =

Defunct tennis tournament
- Tour: ILTF Circuit (1913–1968)
- Founded: 1908; 117 years ago
- Abolished: 1981; 44 years ago
- Location: Tunbridge Wells, Kent, England
- Venue: Tunbridge Wells Lawn Tennis Club
- Surface: Grass/Clay

The Tunbridge Wells Open was a combined men's and women's tennis tournament founded in 1908 as the Tunbridge Wells Open Lawn Tennis Tournament. It was played at the Tunbridge Wells Lawn Tennis Club, Tunbridge Wells, Kent, England. The tournament ran until 1981 when it was discontinued as part of the ILTF Circuit.

== History ==
In 1892 Tunbridge Wells Lawn Tennis Club was founded, but did not at this time have a permanent venue of its own. In 1899 the club was formally incorporated. In August 1908 it established an open tennis event called the Tunbridge Wells Open Lawn Tennis Tournament, The first edition of the men's tournament had a draw of 32 players. The tournament ran annually except for 1915 to 1919 when it was suspended because of World War I and again from 1940 to 1945 due to World War II. The event resumed after the second world war and was staged until 1981 when it was discontinued as part of the worldwide ILTF Circuit.

Former notable winners of the men's singles event included; George Alan Thomas, Bill Sidwell, Choy Wai-Chuen, Constantin Tănăsescu, Jiro Sato, and Vernon Kirby. Previous winners of the women's singles tournament included; Agnes Morton, Dorothy Holman, Ermyntrude Harvey, Jadwiga Jędrzejowska, Ruia Morrison, Virginia Wade, and Dianne Evers.

== Venue ==
In 1898 William Nevill, 1st Marquess of Abergavenny was invited to open the new Nevill Ground sports venue. It then consisted of a cricket pitch, athletic track, football ground, six tennis courts, and some croquet pitches. In 1899 a new club was created for tennis and croquet. By 1906 the whole area had been taken over for tennis and croquet. The club initially had grass courts, then in 1931 four hard courts (clay) were laid where the croquet lawn had been; these were red shale courts. Today the club maintains 21 tennis courts that are made up of natural grass courts, artificial clay courts, and hard tarmac courts.
