= Eugène Smith =

American tennis player

- Full name: Morris Eugène Smith
- Country (sports): United States
- Born: February 16, 1912 Nagasaki, Japan
- Died: May 8, 2005 (aged 93) Morro Bay, California
- Retired: 1947

Singles
- Career titles: 5

Grand Slam singles results
- French Open: 1R (1939)
- Wimbledon: QF (1939)

Grand Slam doubles results
- Wimbledon: 3R (1939)

Morris Eugène Smith (February 16, 1912 – May 8, 2005) was an American amateur tennis player in the 1930s and 1940s.

== Tennis career ==
In 1935, "towering, good natured" Smith of Berkeley won the Canadian International Championships over Dick Bennett in straight sets. He reached the quarterfinals at the Cincinnati Open in 1936 (before falling to Bobby Riggs) and also won four other tournaments during his career. At Wimbledon 1939, Smith beat Roderich Menzel in the second round. Smith had a "service of the cannon-ball variety...if ever a match was truly governed by service this one was", according to the correspondent in The Guardian. The article makes a comparison to cricket by saying "if Smith had been a bowler endowed with the power of delivery, a whole eleven would have been caught in the slips or gully; to judge by the number of serves that hit the edge of Menzel's racket...Smith serves in a similar manner to D. N. Jones, by bending his knees and, using little wrist, getting his whole weight into it. The service is paced with spin. Ground shot rallies of any length were infrequent. Menzel was shackled by lack of mobility and Smith by lack of forcing shots". Smith lost in the quarter finals to Franjo Punčec.
