= John Olliff =

English tennis player, author, and sports journalist (1908–51)

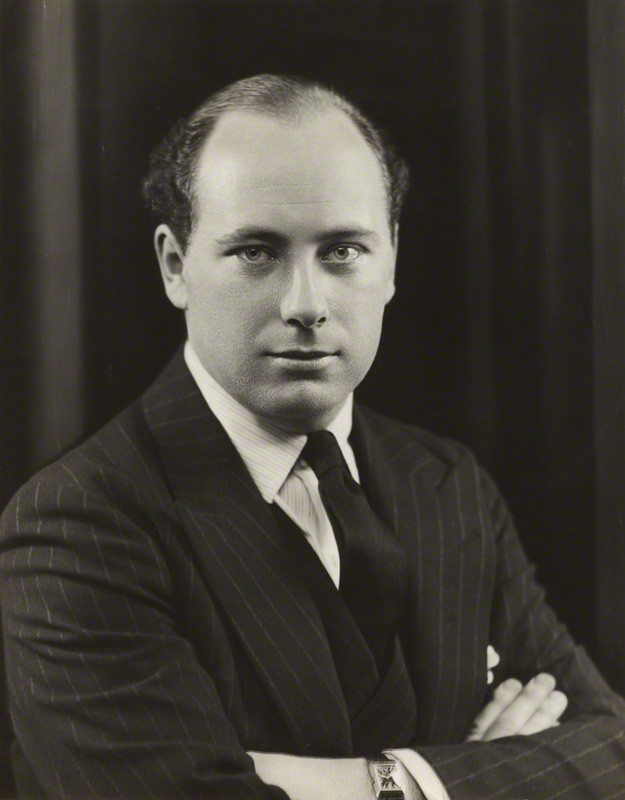
- Olliff in 1936
- Full name: John Sheldon Olliff
- Country (sports): United Kingdom
- Born: 1 December 1908 London, England
- Died: 29 June 1951 (aged 42) Chiswick, London, England
- Turned pro: 1928 (amateur tour)
- Retired: 1949
- Plays: Right-handed (one-handed backhand)

Singles
- Career titles: 24

Grand Slam singles results
- French Open: 3R (1932)
- Wimbledon: 4R (1929, 1931, 1932, 1938, 1939)
- US Open: 4R (1930, 1932)

Grand Slam doubles results
- Wimbledon: SF (1939)
- US Open: QF (1930)

Grand Slam mixed doubles results
- Wimbledon: SF (1934)
- US Open: 2R (1932)

John Sheldon Olliff (1 December 1908 – 29 June 1951) was an English tennis player, author and sports journalist.

== Career ==
=== Tennis player ===
Olliff took part in the Wimbledon Championships from 1928. In singles, he advanced to the fourth round several times until 1939. In doubles, he reached the semifinals with his partner Ronnie Shayes where they lost to Harold Hare and Frank Wilde. At the French Championships, Olliff reached the fourth round in 1932. He also played at the US Championships in 1929 and 1930, advancing to the quarterfinals in the last year.

Olliff won 24 tournaments in his career as a tennis player such as: the Northern Lawn Tennis Championships (1928, 1929, 1931), the Irish Championships (1930), the Queen's Club Championships (1931) and the Surrey Grass Court Championships (1938). In addition he won single titles at the Westgate-on-Sea Tournament (1938) on hard asphalt. After the Second World War, he played a match for the British Davis Cup team in the first round against France in 1946. With Henry Billington, he lost against Marcel Bernard and Bernard Destremau.

=== Sports journalist ===
After his active career, he took a job as a sportsjournalist at the Daily Telegraph and succeeded A. Wallis Myers as tennis correspondent. He died of a heart attack on the way to a match at Wimbledon on 29 June 1951. His successor at the Telegraph became Lance Tingay.

== Bibliography ==
- The Groundwork of Lawn Tennis. Methuen & Co., London 1934.
- Olliff on Tennis. Eyre and Spottiswoode, London 1948.
- The Romance of Wimbledon. London 1949.
- Lawn Tennis. Pitman & Sons, London 1950.
- Lawn Tennis for Beginners. W. & G. Foyle, London 1951.
