= Ottó Szigeti =

Hungarian tennis player

- Country (sports): Hungary
- Born: 22 December 1911; Csobánka
- Died: 5 April 1976 (aged 64); Budapest
- Retired: 1948
- Plays: Left-handed

Singles
- Career record: 36–27

Grand Slam singles results
- French Open: SF (1939)
- Wimbledon: 4R (1939)

Doubles

Grand Slam doubles results
- Wimbledon: QF (1938)

Grand Slam mixed doubles results
- Wimbledon: 2R (1938, 1939)

Ottó Szigeti (Hungarian: [ˈsiɡɛti ˈottoː]; 22 December 1911 – 5 April 1976) was a Hungarian tennis player in the 1930s and 1940s.

== Tennis career ==
Szigeti played under the name Ottó Schmidt as a professional.

As an amateur, he reached the semifinals of the French Open (losing to Bobby Riggs) and the fourth round of Wimbledon in 1939. In doubles, he reached the quarterfinals of the 1938 Wimbledon men's doubles.
