= Ignacy Tłoczyński =

Polish tennis player (1911–2000)

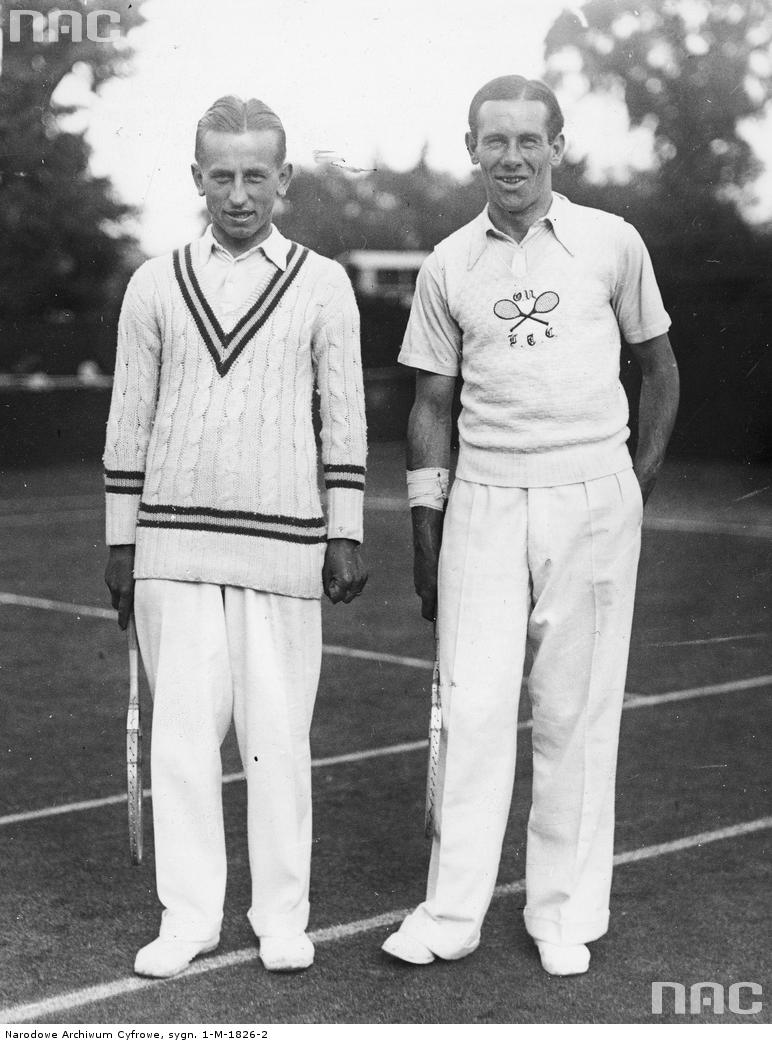
- Ignacy Tłoczyński (left)
- Full name: Ignacy Stanisław Tłoczyński
- Country (sports): Poland
- Born: 14 July 1911 Posen, German Empire (modern Poznań, Poland)
- Died: 25 December 2000 (aged 89) Edinburgh, United Kingdom
- Turned pro: 1929 (amateur tour)
- Retired: 1955
- Plays: Right-handed

Grand Slam singles results
- French Open: QF (1939)
- Wimbledon: 3R (1931, 1939, 1946, 1953)

Grand Slam doubles results
- French Open: SF

Grand Slam mixed doubles results
- French Open: 3R (1934)
- Wimbledon: 3R (1932)

Ignacy Tłoczyński (Polish pronunciation: [iɡˈnatsɨ twɔˈtʂɨj̃skʲi]; 14 July 1911 – 25 December 2000) was a Polish tennis player, coach and World War II veteran.

Tłoczyński participated in 10 Davis Cup ties for Poland from 1930–1939, posting a 23–8 record in singles and a 3–9 record in doubles. He won two national titles in singles, seven in doubles and was a six-time International Polish Championship winner. He was ranked number one in Poland in 1934.

In international level he reached the third round at Wimbledon on four occasions. He was a doubles semi-finalist for the French Open with Adam Baworowski, won the Monte-Carlo tournament (now known as the Monte-Carlo Masters) in doubles with Józef Hebda, a two-times singles runner-up for the British Hard Court Championships, and three-times Scottish champion.

== Early life ==
Ignacy Tłoczyński was born 14 July 1911, in Poznań, then part of the German Empire, and was considered a skilful young player practising at the local courts of the town. Despite being a kid he was the sparring partner of players of the Academic Sports Association. He was born to a poor family and was forced to play tennis for money. According to the amateur rules that were in effect in pre-World War II tennis organisations, only professionals could financially benefit from playing. However the Polish Lawn Tennis Association suspended his penalty. He then moved to Warsaw and found a job at an insurance company.

== Tennis career ==
He first participated in the Polish Championship in 1929, eventually losing in the quarterfinals to national champion Max Stolarow. Later he won his first title in doubles at the Warmian Voivodeship tournament. This earned him a spot in the Poland Davis Cup team next year for the upcoming match with Romania, where he won both of his rubbers. These achievements led to him being put up for voting by the Przegląd Sportowy newspaper for the Polish Sportspersonality of the Year where he finished second, right behind track and field runner Janusz Kusociński. The same year he was crowned Polish champion after his victory over Stolarow in the final.

In September 1931 he defended his national title and paired up with Wanda Dubieńska for the mixed contest, only losing in the final to Popławski/Volkmer. Also in September at the Polish International Championships, he was only beaten by French Benny Berthet both in the singles and doubles event. In 1932 he shared the Cannes L.T.C. trophy with Giorgio de Stefani, as their match remained unplayed. They also divided the doubles title. He lost the mixed doubles partnering Jadwiga Jędrzejowska to Swiss team of Lolette Payot and Charles Aeschlimann. He then met de Stefani again for the Nizza L.T.C. championship, unsuccessfully. He and Jędrzejowska were runners-up again for the mixed doubles. De Stefani fought him for the Nice L.T.C. as well, but Tłoczyński fell for the second time. He and Miss Jędrzejowska were beaten for the second time by Miss Payot and Hector Fisher. In 1933 he finally won the Nizza title both in singles and doubles, with his Davis Cup teammate Józef Hebda against Max Ellmer and Aeschlimann-Journu respectively. He won the Polish national championships as well without dropping a single set.

In 1934 he lost the Hungarian International Tennis Championships to Czechoslovak Ladislav Hecht. In 1938 he repeated that feat beating Hebda and won the doubles with Adam Baworowski. In March 1939 he won the doubles of the Monte-Carlo tournament with Józef Hebda, overcoming the Belgian duo of Pierre Geelhand de Merxem and Charles Naeyaert. Just before the outbreak of World War II, in July he won the Polish international championships held in Gdynia in mixed doubles with Jadwiga Jędrzejowska and was a runner-up for the gentlemen's doubles.

In the 1946 Wimbledon Championships he represented his nation, although the Communist government of Poland protested against it because of his wartime affiliation with Anders and the partisans. He refused to remove the Polish badge from his cloth, although his nationality indication was removed from the main draw. In 1946 he won the singles title at the North of England Hard Court Championships on clay in Scarborough and retained it in 1947, he would go on to win it three more times consecutivley between 1948 and 1950. Additionally he also won the North of England Championships on grass two times from 1946 to 1947. Also in 1947 he participated in an international match between Poland and Great Britain still wearing the Polish colours. In 1947 he was defeated in straight sets at the British Hard Court Championships by South African Eric Sturgess as well as the next year also to Sturgess in straights.

In July 1950 rain prevented the doubles final to be played at the Midland Counties Championships in Birmingham where Tłoczyński and Czesław Spychała were about to be featured and the prize was shared with their opponents Jaroslav Drobný and Bill Sidwell. That same year Tłoczyński won singles titles at Bedford Open, St. Andrews, Carlisle and the covered court tournaments including the Welsh Covered Court Championships at Llandudno and the Palace Hotel Covered Courts at Torquay. In May 1951 he was victorious in the doubles event of the Sutton Coldfield Hardcourts Tournament partnering Peter Hare. Although his efforts were fruitless in the singles competition as he was subdued in the final against Peter Cawthorn. In October he was a finalist for the Covered Court Championships of the United Kingdom facing eventual victor Geoffrey Paish. In March 1952 he won the Southdean Covered Court Championships at Middleton-on-Sea against Gerry Oakley. In 1952 he entered the Connaught Hard Court Championships tournament where he reached the doubles final together with Anthony John Mottram where they were stopped by Cawthorn-Tregonning. Between 1950–1952 he won the Scottish Hard Court Championships three consecutive years. In 1954 he captured the North of England Hard Court Championships title for the sixth time by defeating Matthew Farhang Mohtadi in three sets although Mohtadi found success in the doubles final against Tłoczyński/Pryor.

== During World War II ==
In early November 1939 after the Invasion of Poland he was reported missing and hiding in Latvia. Later it turned out that he was working in a Warsaw Cafe with mixed doubles partner Jadwiga Jędrzejowska. During the war he was involved in the Warsaw Uprising as a member of the Polish Resistance and smuggled hazardous cargoes in the city. In the first days of the uprising along with his brother Ksawery and several prominent sportsmen including Czesław Spychała, Jerzy Gottschalk, Antoni Smordowski and Tadeusz Hanke he stormed an SS barrack and occupied it. The assault, which took place on 1 August 1944 saw a one and a half-hour struggle in which the partisans threw in grenades and petrol bombs and surrendered the Germans. They took 72 SS soldiers as prisoners and seized a handful of ammunition and an armoured car. The Tłoczyński brothers and Spychała were all wounded as a result of the fight. He kept on serving as a corporal and mainly operated in the Śródmieście-Północ as a member of the battalion "Ruczaj" within the Wojskowa Służba Ochrony Powstania branch of the Sub-district I of Śródmieście. His codename was "Igo." He was wounded and transferred to a POW camp near Salzburg-Maxglan. After being liberated by the Allies he joined the 2nd Polish Corps of Władysław Anders. After the war he emigrated to Britain.

== Personal life ==
In 1955 he officially retired from tennis and went on to coaching at the Dunlop Tennis Club in Edinburgh. His most famous coachee was Suzi Mair.
