= Rolf Göpfert =

German former tennis player

- ITF name: Rolf Goepfert
- Country (sports): Germany
- Born: 16 February 1916

Singles

Grand Slam singles results
- French Open: 1R (1952)
- Wimbledon: 3R (1938, 1939)

Rolf Göpfert (born 16 February 1916) is a German former tennis player.

A member of Berlin's Rot-Weiss Tennis Club, Göpfert was a German indoor singles champion and had two stints in the national Davis Cup team, the first in 1938 and 1939. He featured in the Davis Cup again from 1951 to 1953, during this time partnering Gottfried von Cramm in doubles.

Göpfert twice reached the singles third round of the Wimbledon Championships.

== See also ==
- List of Germany Davis Cup team representatives
