= Donald MacPhail (tennis) =

Scottish tennis player

- Full name: Donald MacPhail
- Country (sports): United Kingdom
- Born: 25 December 1910 Glasgow, Scotland, United Kingdom
- Died: February 1997 (aged 86) Essex, United Kingdom
- Turned pro: 1932 (amateur tour)
- Retired: 1947

Singles
- Career record: 139-60 (69.9%)
- Career titles: 6

Grand Slam singles results
- Wimbledon: QF (1938)

Grand Slam doubles results
- Wimbledon: QF (1939)

Grand Slam mixed doubles results
- Wimbledon: 3R (1936, 1937, 1939)

Donald MacPhail (1910–1997) was a Scottish tennis player in the years before and after World War 2.

MacPhail won the Scottish Championships men's singles four times (1933, 1936, 1939 and 1946) on grass. and he won the Scottish Hard Court Championships singles title two times (1937–38) on clay. He was a quarter finalist at Wimbledon in 1938, where he beat third seed Roderich Menzel when Menzel retired at the end of the second set. Although the match was marred by Menzel's retirement, according to The Glasgow Herald, "there is little doubt that the Scot would have won it anyway after securing the vital second set". MacPhail was a Flight Lieutenant. MacPhail competed in the Wimbledon men's singles from 1933 to 1946. In later life MacPhail moved to England and died in Essex in 1997 aged 86.
