= Harry Lee (tennis) =

British tennis player

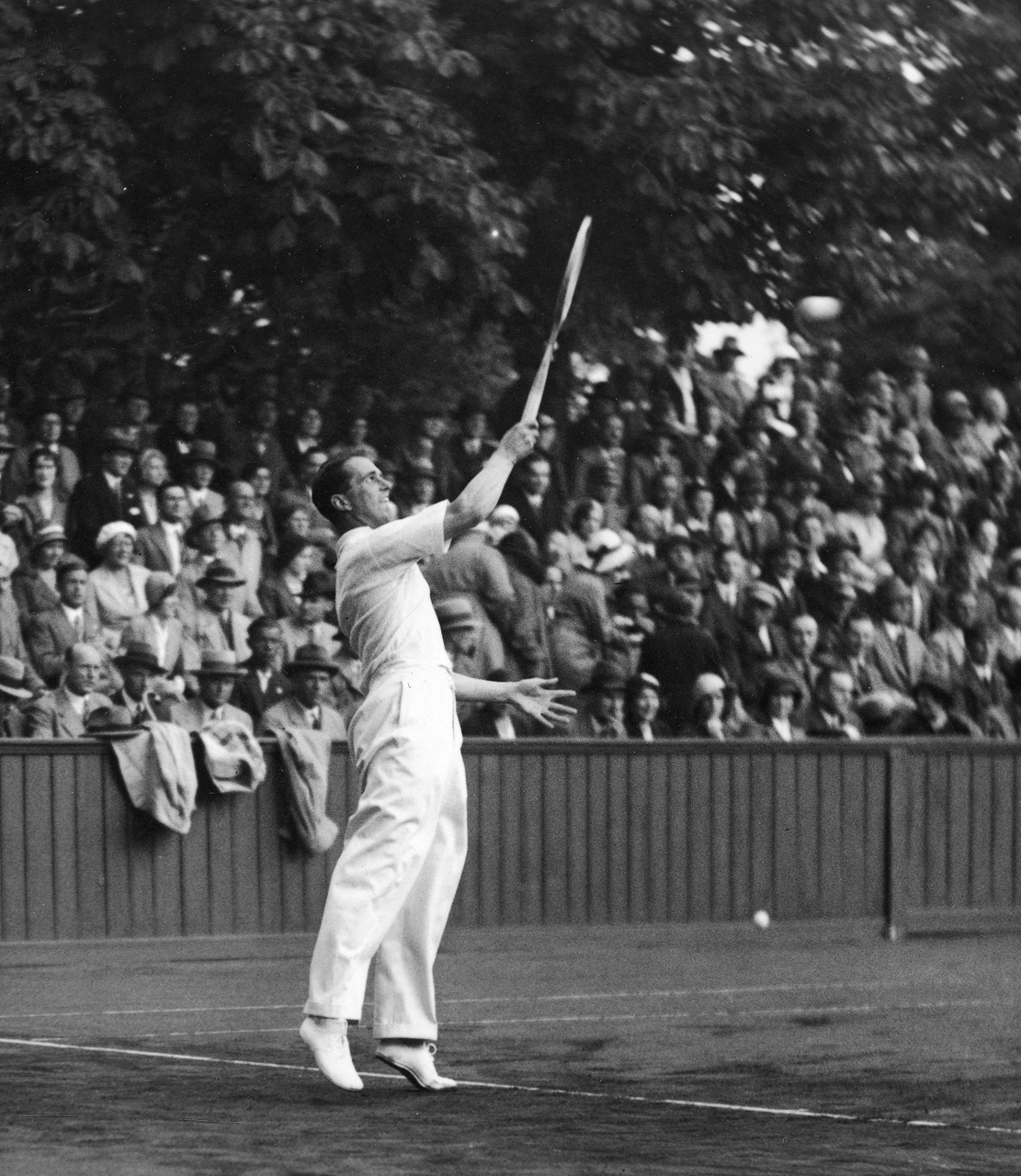
- Full name: Harold George Newcombe Lee
- Country (sports): United Kingdom
- Born: 15 June 1907; Teddington, London
- Died: 14 April 1998 (aged 90); Frome, Somerset, England
- Turned pro: 1927 (amateur tour)
- Retired: 1950
- Plays: Right-handed (one-handed backhand)

Singles
- Career titles: 12

Grand Slam singles results
- Australian Open: QF (1934)
- French Open: SF (1933)
- Wimbledon: 4R (1931, 1933, 1934, 1936)
- US Open: 4R (1930, 1933)

Doubles

Grand Slam doubles results
- Australian Open: 2R (1934)
- Wimbledon: QF (1932)

Mixed doubles

Grand Slam mixed doubles results
- Wimbledon: SF (1934)

Team competitions
- Davis Cup: W (1933, 1934)

Harry Lee (15 June 1907 – 14 April 1998) was a British tennis player. He was a two time Davis Cup winner (1933-1934) and a semi finalist at the 1933 French Championships. Between 1927 and 1950, Lee won 12 career singles titles.

== Career ==
In major tennis tournaments, he was a semi finalist at the 1933 French Championships, a quarter finalist at the 1934 Australian Championships. He also reached the fourth round of Wimbledon Championships on four occasions as well as reaching the fourth round of the U.S. National Championships in 1930.

Lee played his first tournament in 1927 at the Wimbledon Championships where he reached the third round. In 1929 he won his first title at the Kent Championships at Beckenham on grass against Charles Kingsley.

In 1930, he won the singles title at the British Hard Court Championships after a four-sets victory in the final over Eric Peters, and the same year he won the Irish Championships at Dublin against Pat Hughes, and the Beaulieu International Championship at the Hotel Bristol at Beaulieu-sur-Mer, France against Bunny Austin.

In 1931, Harry entered seven tournaments and won three titles including the Priory Club tournament against Keats Lester, the West Kensington Hard Courts against Japanese player Iwao Aoki and the South Croydon Hard Courts against another Japanese player Ryuki Miki. This year he was also a finalist at the St.George's Hill Open losing to Ryuki Miki.

In 1932, he was a finalist at the Bermuda Championships at Hamilton and played on hard courts where he lost to Fred Perry. Lee was a semi finalist at the French championships in 1933, where he beat Daniel Prenn and Marcel Bernard before losing to Henri Cochet.

In 1933 and 1934, he was part of the Davis Cup team, including Fred Perry, Bunny Austin and Pat Hughes. They defeated the French team at Roland Garros in 1933 and the United States in 1934.

In 1936, he won the inaugural Palace Hotel Covered Courts at Torquay played indoors against Frank Wilde. In 1939 he won his last title at the Exmouth Open on grass against Henry Billington.

In 1950, Lee played his last event at the Bath tournament where he reached the final losing to British Ceylon player Doug Scharenguivel. Between 1927 and 1950, Lee won 12 career titles, he died at his home at the age of 90 on April 14, 1998.
