= Cam Malfroy =

New Zealand tennis player

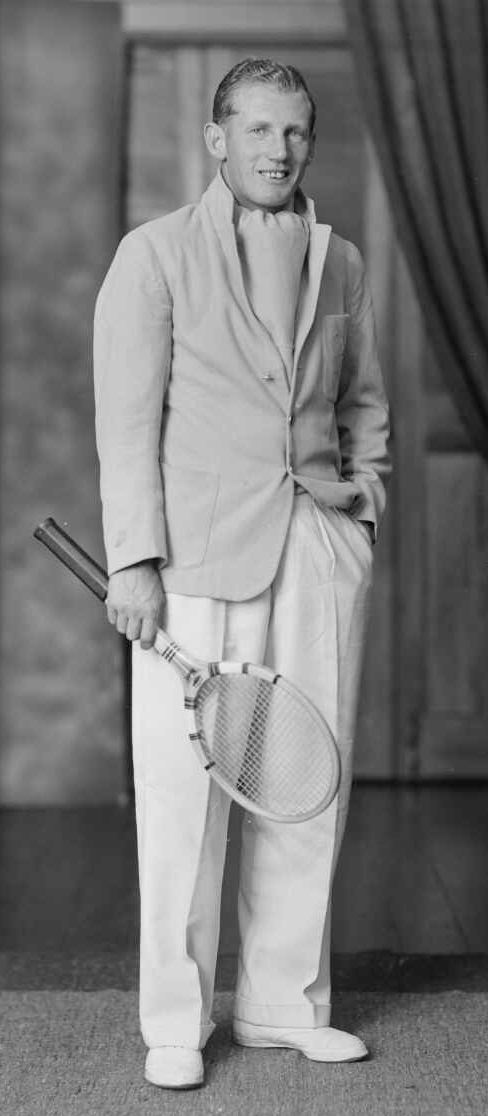
- Malfroy in 1935
- Full name: Camille Enright Malfroy
- Country (sports): New Zealand
- Born: 21 January 1909 Hokitika, New Zealand
- Died: 8 May 1966 (aged 57)

Singles

Grand Slam singles results
- Australian Open: 2R (1934)
- French Open: 2R (1934)
- Wimbledon: 4R (1931, 1936)

Team competitions
- Davis Cup: QF^{Eu} (1934)

Camille Enright Malfroy, DFC (21 January 1909 – 8 May 1966) was a prominent New Zealand tennis player of the 1930s and 1940s, competing in numerous grand slam championships of the era, and a fighter pilot and flying ace of the Second World War.

== Early and personal life ==
Camille Enright Malfroy was born in Hokitika on 21 January 1909 the son of Camille M. Malfroy, of the State Forest Department, Wellington and younger brother of the rugby player Jules Malfroy. The Malfroy family in New Zealand was descended from Jean Baptiste Malfroy, originally from Macornay, Lons-le-Saunier, France, a miller, and his wife, Josephine Pricarde. Jean Baptiste along with two of his sons, Jean Michel Camille Malfroy, usually known as Camille, and Jules Cézar Malfroy (the eldest of the three brothers), joined the rush to the Victorian goldfields in the 1850s and arrived in New Zealand in the early 1860s.

Malfroy, like his older brother Jules, attended Trinity Hall, Cambridge, where he studied economics. At Cambridge he received his Blue for tennis and was also a noted rugby player.

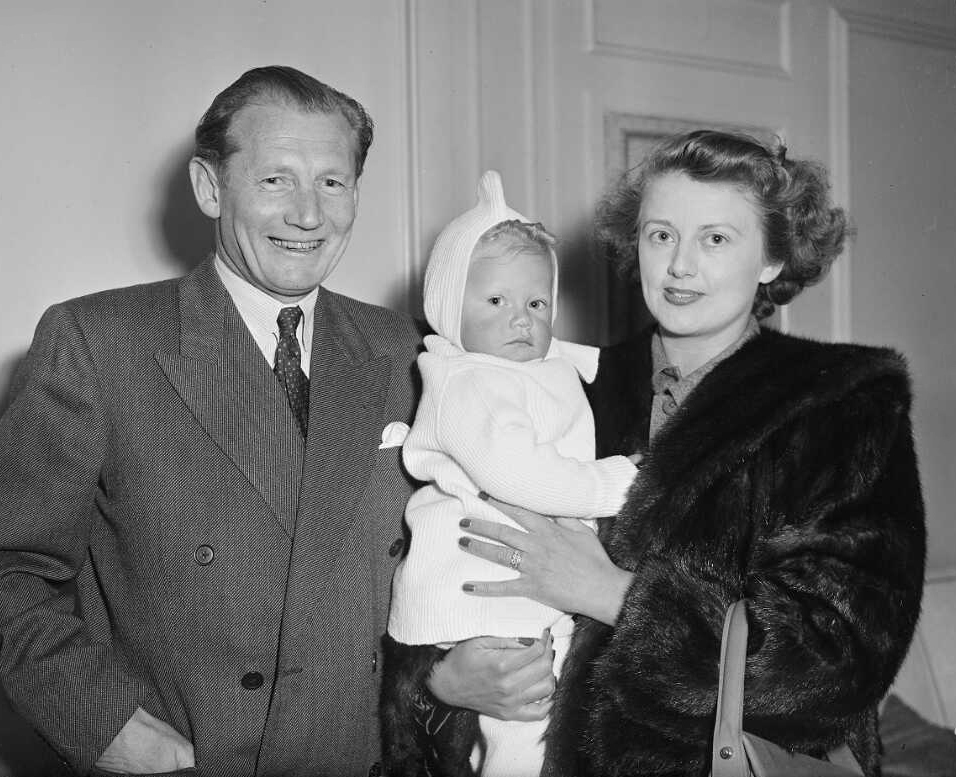
Malfroy with family in 1951

In 1939 Malfroy married Sybil Gordon. They divorced in the 1940s. Malfroy remarried in 1948.

== Tennis career ==
In the 1930s Cam Malfroy was a well-known tennis player and represented New Zealand in the Davis Cup. He played 12 matches for New Zealand between 1934 and 1939. In singles he won two matches and lost five, and in doubles he won three matches and lost two. Away from the Davis Cup, he was in the final of the New Zealand tennis championships in 1932 and 1933, winning the title in 1933 after a five-set victory in the final against Clifford Sproule. He also competed in a number of Grand Slam tournaments, nine times at Wimbledon, and once each in the France and Australian Opens. The furthest he progressed in any of these was to the fourth round of the 1931 Wimbledon championships. After his 1934, the year of his final triumph in the New Zealand championships, he moved to England and thereafter only competed in Europe, notably at Wimbledon, but also a number of other minor tournaments. As a doubles player he also won the Men's title twice (once in 1929–30 partnering D. G. France and a second time in 1932–33 partnering I. A. Seay) and won the Mixed Doubles in 1932–33 partnering Miss M. Macfarlane.

=== Performance timeline ===
Key
W	F	SF	QF	#R	RR	Q#	DNQ	A	NH

(W) winner; (F) finalist; (SF) semifinalist; (QF) quarterfinalist; (#R) rounds 4, 3, 2, 1; (RR) round-robin stage; (Q#) qualification round; (DNQ) did not qualify; (A) absent; (NH) not held; (SR) strike rate (events won / competed); (W–L) win–loss record.

Tournament	1927	1928	1929	1930	1931	1932	1933	1934	1935	1936	1937	1938	1939	1946	1947
Australian Open	A	A	A	A	A	A	A	2R	A	A	A	A	A	A	A
French Open	A	A	A	A	A	A	A	2R	A	A	A	A	A	A	A
Wimbledon	A	A	A	2R	4R	2R	A	3R	2R	4R	A	2R	3R	A	1R
U.S. Open	A	A	A	A	A	A	A	A	A	A	A	A	A	A	A
Grand Slam Win–loss	0–0	0–0	0–0	1–1	3–1	1–1	0–0	4–3	1–1	3–1	0–0	1–1	2–1	0–0	0–1
New Zealand tennis championships	2R	4R	A	SF	A	F	W	A	A	A	A	A	A	A	A
Auckland championships	A	A	A	A	A	A	A	F	A	A	A	A	A	A	A
North Island championships	A	A	A	A	A	A	A	W	A	A	A	A	A	A	A
Canterbury championships	A	A	A	A	A	A	A	F	A	A	A	A	A	A	A
Villa d'Este	A	A	A	A	A	A	A	F	A	A	A	A	A	A	A
German Covered court championships	A	A	A	A	A	A	A	A	A	2R	A	A	A	A	A
Swedish Covered courts championships	A	A	A	A	A	A	A	A	A	QF	A	A	A	A	A
Monte Carlo championships	A	A	A	A	A	A	A	A	A	3R	A	A	A	A	A
Roehampton	A	A	A	A	A	A	A	A	A	A	A	F	A	A	A
Queen's Spring Covered Court Championship	A	A	A	A	A	A	A	A	A	A	A	SF	A	A	A
Paddington	A	A	A	A	A	A	A	A	A	A	A	SF	A	A	A
British Hard Court Championships	A	A	A	A	A	A	A	A	A	A	A	3R	2R	A	A
Midland counties championships	A	A	A	A	A	A	A	A	A	A	A	QF	A	A	A
Welsh championships	A	A	A	A	A	A	A	A	A	A	A	SF	A	A	A
Palace Hotel	A	A	A	A	A	A	A	A	A	A	A	QF	A	A	A
Herga Club	A	A	A	A	A	A	A	A	A	A	A	A	F	A	A

== Military career ==
Malfroy learned to fly in 1931–32 while a student at Cambridge University with the University Air Squadron. Soon after the outbreak of the Second World War in September 1939 he was mobilised with the Royal Air Force (RAF) and joined No. 501 Squadron RAF. On 10 May 1940, the start of the German offensive against Western Europe and France, his squadron moved across the English Channel as reinforcements for the RAF units already there. It was recorded that Malfroy claimed a Heinkel He 111 of II./KG 53 destroyed on 11 May near Bétheniville. Malfroy's squadron continued to fight until the evacuation from Dinard in Brittany on 18 June 1940. The following day, the Hurricanes flew from St Helier on Jersey to cover the British Army's evacuation from Cherbourg. Flight Lieutenant Malfroy then became an instructor at No. 57 Operational Training Unit at Hawarden, rejoining No. 501 Squadron in February 1941 until December, when he was posted to No. 417 Squadron RAF at Charmy Down flying Spitfires. He led No. 417 Squadron until March 1942, when he then commanded No. 66 Squadron RAF. In June 1942 he was posted as Chief Flying Instructor to No. 61 Operational Training Unit. He then had a short posting on the Training Staff at HQ 10 Group, before returning to operations in June 1943 to become wing commander (flying) at RAF Exeter. In early 1944, he took command of 145 Airfield. He then moved to the staff at HQ Allied Expeditionary Air Force and in late 1944 commanded RAF Portreath and RAF Warmwell in 1945.

Malfroy was credited with five (Note: Aces High (1994) considers this number unlikely and states that only one claim was made. The London Gazette issue in June 1942, however, mentions that "He has destroyed at least 4 enemy aircraft and damaged several others.".) enemy aircraft destroyed during the war. He was awarded both the Commonwealth Distinguished Flying Cross and the American Distinguished Flying Cross.
