= Léopold de Borman =

Belgian tennis player

- Country (sports): Belgium
- Born: 21 March 1909; Ixelles, Belgium
- Died: 9 March 1979 (aged 69)

Singles

Grand Slam singles results
- French Open: 2R (1929, 1930, 1932, 1933)
- Wimbledon: 2R (1929, 1933, 1936, 1939)

Léopold de Borman (21 March 1909 – 9 March 1979) was a Belgian tennis player of the 1930s.

Born in Ixelles, de Borman was the son of tennis players Paul de Borman and Anne de Selliers de Moranville. His two sisters, Geneviève and Myriam, were also noted players.

De Borman won Belgium's national singles championships three years in a row from 1929 to 1931. He featured in 19 Davis Cup ties between 1930 and 1939, with all of his 14 wins coming in doubles rubbers.

== See also ==
- List of Belgium Davis Cup team representatives
