= Choy Wai-Chuen =

Chinese tennis player

- Country (sports): (Republic of China (1912–1949)) China
- Born: 5 March 1914 British Hong Kong
- Died: 29 July 1951 (aged 37) London, England
- Plays: Right-handed

Singles

Grand Slam singles results
- French Open: 2R (1937)
- Wimbledon: 3R (1939)
- US Open: 2R (1940)

Choy Wai-Chuen (5 March 1914 – 29 July 1951) was a Chinese tennis player.

Born in Hong Kong, Choy received an education in England and was a graduate of Framlingham College. He attended Cambridge University, gaining his blue for tennis.

Choy, a player of slight build, was described as playing his tennis like a game of chess, using all angles to his tactical advantage. He made his debut for the China Davis Cup team in 1937. At the 1938 Wimbledon Championships he troubled third seed Roderich Menzel in a second round match, losing 6–8 in the fifth set. In 1939 he played an All-Chinese final at the British Hard Court Championships, which he lost to Kho Sin-Kie.

During World War II, Choy played in benefit matches to raise money for the China Relief Fund. He was in Hong Kong for this purpose when the Japanese invaded in 1941 and became a prisoner in a Japanese internment camp. In April, 1942, it was announced that he had managed to escape and was on his way to Chongqing.

Choy died of leukaemia in London in 1951, aged 37.

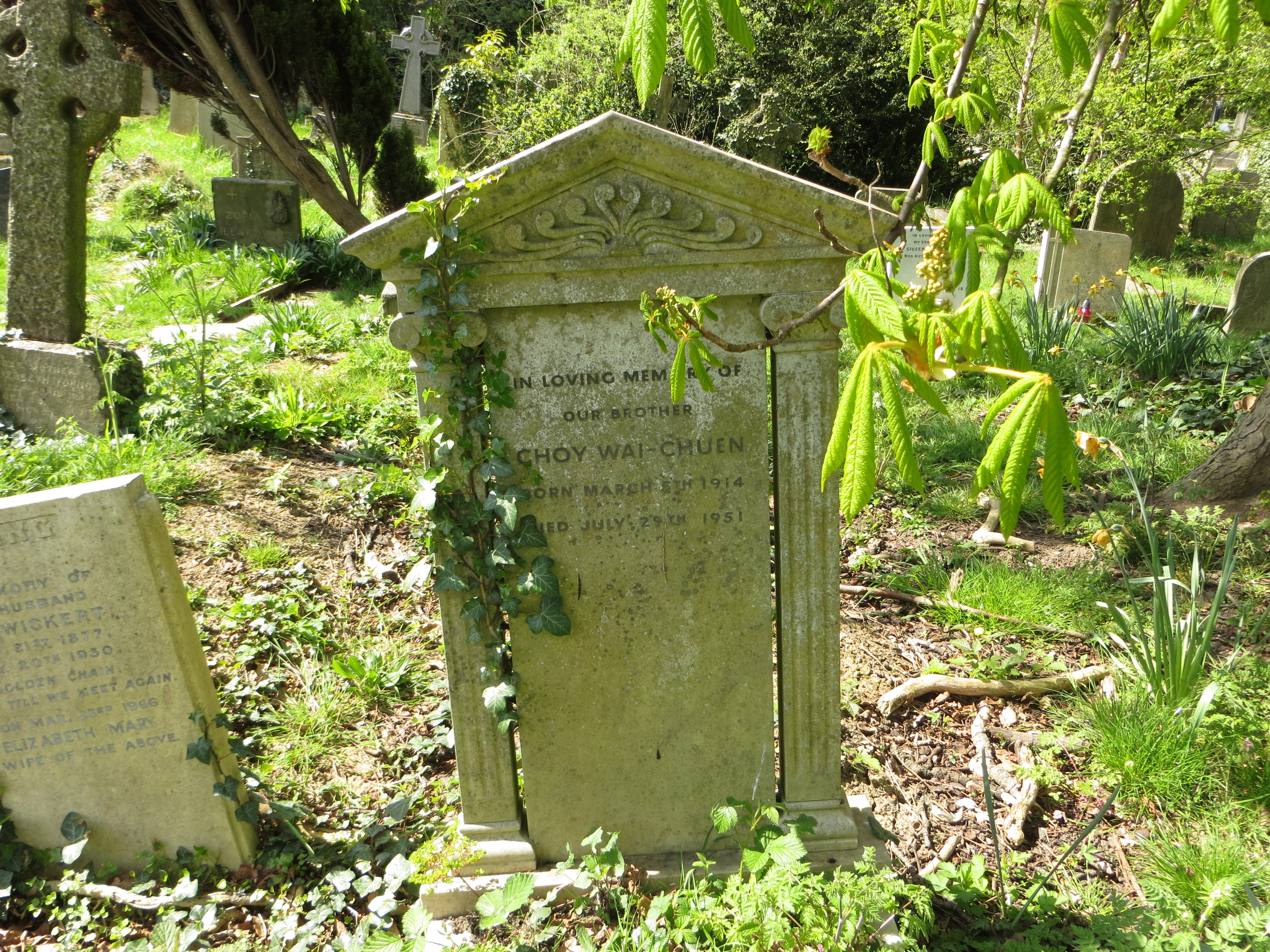
His grave in Hampstead Cemetery. (Photo 2015)
