= Franjo Kukuljević =

Croatian tennis player (1909–2002)

- Country (sports): Yugoslavia
- Born: 7 October 1909 Zagreb, Austria-Hungary
- Died: 11 August 2002 (aged 92) Johannesburg, South Africa
- Turned pro: 1929 (amateur tour)
- Retired: 1948
- Plays: Left-handed

Singles

Grand Slam singles results
- French Open: 4R (1938)
- Wimbledon: QF (1939)
- US Open: 4R (1938)

Doubles

Grand Slam doubles results
- French Open: SF (1938)
- Wimbledon: QF (1948)
- US Open: 3R (1938)

Grand Slam mixed doubles results
- French Open: F (1939)
- Wimbledon: QF (1936)

Franjo Kukuljević (Serbo-Croatian: Фрањо Кукуљевић; pronounced [frǎːɲo kukǔːʎeʋitɕ]; 7 October 1909 – 11 August 2002) was a Yugoslav tennis player. He played for the Yugoslavian team at the International Lawn Tennis Challenge from 1930 to 1939. He was a 13-time national champion – one in singles, six in doubles and six in the mixed doubles, usually with Vlasta Gostiša. He was a Dutch, Indian and Danish champion as well.

== Tennis career ==
Franjo Kukuljević first came to attention when he won the National Tennis Championships in 1929. This led to him receiving an invitation to join the Kingdom of Yugoslavia Davis Cup team the following year in Zagreb. He made his debut with doubles partner Ivan Radović, losing to the Spanish team. He was also defeated in his singles match by Enrique Maier due to his lack of match play. This was followed by appearances at international tournaments in places such as Kaposvár, Piešťany and Semmering. In 1930 he was selected to represent Yugoslavia in the inaugural Balkan Games in Athens, joined by Franjo Šefer and Vlasta Gostiša. Playing singles, doubles and mixed doubles matches, they earned a silver medal, the final scores of the top five teams being Romania with 25 points, Yugoslavia with 24, Greece with 18, Bulgaria with 4, and Turkey with 3.

In 1931 Zagreb welcomed the Japan Davis Cup team consisting of the Sato brothers and Minoru Kawashima who were scheduled to face Yugoslavia in the first round of the Davis Cup in front of 1,500 spectators, which at the time was a record at the tennis courts in Yugoslavia. Kukuljević nearly defeated Hyotaro Sato whom he pushed to five sets. He competed again at the second Balkan Games.

In 1932 a rivalry arose between Kukuljević and the up-and-coming talent Franjo Punčec. They met in two notable finals, first in the Yugoslavian International Championships, and then in the national championships. In both meetings Kukuljević dominated the field and left victorious. Kukuljević then returned to Semmering where he booked his first world top ten trophy over a Wimbledon champion, the Australian Jack Crawford.

The 1933–1934 season saw Kukuljević's decline as Franjo Punčec stripped him of his national singles title. After travelling to Egypt he injured himself, which caused him to waste the rest of his season. In 1935 he won the All-India Lawn Tennis Doubles Championships with Franjo Šefer. He performed well in the mixed doubles as well and took the Netherlands Championships mixed trophy.

By chance, in 1937 at the Wimbledon Championships he met Madansinhji, the Maharaja of Kutch, with whom he played doubles. They became lifelong friends. Kukuljević went on to claim the singles title in the Dutch Championships after eliminating Giorgio de Stefani in the final. He then travelled to Düsseldorf, clinching the tournament there by beating Czechoslovak Josef Síba for the title. He became the Danish champion as well in Copenhagen after facing his compatriot Josip Palada in the final match. In the doubles he won the South of Sweden Championships. He then toured India and Nepal again, then sailed to the Philippines and Japan to take part in exhibition matches.

In 1938 Kukuljević reached the Davis Cup Europe final with Punčec and Palada, and only lost to Germany in Berlin. In Belgrade he beat world number one Don Budge in two straight sets, which was a major upset.

In the 1939 Wimbledon Championships he beat reigning French champion Don McNeill in the second round, a huge feat that received a massive media coverage in England. He marched into the quarterfinals where only Henner Henkel of Germany was able to stop him. Together with Simonne Mathieu of France, he was runner-up at the French Open mixed doubles event in 1939.

In 1943 he was still active within the seceded Independent State of Croatia. He played in Gödöllő where he lost in the doubles, partnering Josip Sarić.

In 1948 he added the North of England Championships to his accolades, which he won in Scarborough from Gerald Oakley of Britain.

== Later life ==
Kukuljević had a brother named Tomislav. After World War II, they emigrated to South Africa, where Kukuljević worked as a merchant and married Ljuba Kukuljević. He died in 2002 in Johannesburg, South Africa.

== Grand Slam finals ==
=== Mixed doubles: (1 runner-up) ===
Result	Year	Championship	Surface	Partner	Opponents	Score
Loss	1939	French Championships	Clay	(France) Simonne Mathieu	(United States) Sarah Palfrey (United States) Elwood Cooke	6–4, 1–6, 5–7

== Works cited ==
=== Primary ===
- Šoškić, Čedomir (2012). Тениски савез Србије Тенис без граници 1922–2012. [Tennis Association of Serbia, Tennis without Borders 1922–2012] (PDF) (in Serbian). Belgrade, Serbia: Tennis Association of Serbia. pp. 262–265. Archived from the original (PDF) on 30 December 2013.

=== Secondary ===
- Mursalo, Tvrtko Andrija (2003). Hrvati na jugu Afrike [Croatians in southern Africa] (in Croatian). Zagreb, Croatia: Nakladni zavod Matice Hrvatske & Hrvatska matica iseljenika. Archived from the original on 15 April 2015.
- "All India tennis final". The Straits Times. Singapore, Straits Settlements: Straits Times Press: 14. 12 February 1935.
- "Kukuljevic wins". The Straits Times. Singapore, Straits Settlements: Straits Times Press: 10. 22 August 1948.
- Weston, Mervyn (20 June 1939). "Another title to Mcneill – Bid by veterans". The Argus (28, 962). Melbourne, Australia: Argus Office: 15.
- "Meglepetések a gödöllői teniszversenyen" [Upsets at the tournament of Gödöllő] (in Hungarian). Budapest, Hungary: Huszadik század. September 1943.
- "Norddeutscher Lloyd passenger list". Die-maus-bremen.de (in German). Bremen, Germany: Chamber of Commerce and the State Archive of Bremen. 11 August 1939.
