= Murray Deloford =

British tennis player

- Full name: Murray Don Deloford
- Country (sports): United Kingdom
- Born: 15 June 1916; Middlesex, England
- Died: 12 February 1981 (aged 64); London, England
- Plays: Right-handed

Singles

Grand Slam singles results
- French Open: 3R (1938)
- Wimbledon: 4R (1939)
- US Open: 1R (1937)

Murray Don Deloford (15 June 1916 – 12 February 1981) was a British tennis player.

Deloford, a London native, had his best period on tour in the late 1930s, winning the Scottish Championships, Irish Championships and Kent Championships amongst other titles. At the 1939 Wimbledon Championships he made it through to the round of 16, beating Yugoslav Davis Cup player Dragutin Mitić en route. He was considered unfortunate not to have played Davis Cup tennis himself during this period.

In World War II, Deloford served with Royal Air Force and was involved in operations over Germany, Greece, North Africa and Italy. He was awarded a Distinguished Flying Cross for gallantry in 1943.

After the war he was married to Mavis Rosita Outram, with whom he had two children. The couple ended up in divorce court in 1957 and his wife made allegations of cruelty, while he countered that she had committed adultery. A jury found him not guilty of the cruelty allegations and issued a divorce decree.
