= Jack Van den Eynde =

Belgian footballer and tennis player

- Jack Van den Eynde

Personal information
- Full name: John Evelyn Adolf Frank Van den Eynde
- Date of birth: 14 April 1914
- Place of birth: Ranst, Belgium
- Date of death: 18 September 1993 (aged 79)
- Place of death: Antwerp, Belgium
- Position: Striker

Senior career*
| Years | Team | Apps | (Gls) |
| 1932–1937 | Beerschot VAC | 40 | (12) |
- * Club domestic league appearances and goals

John "Jack" Van den Eynde (14 April 1914 – 18 September 1993) was a Belgian footballer and Davis Cup tennis player. He played his football as a striker and featured in 40 matches in the Belgian First Division at Beerschot VAC, scoring 12 goals. His brother Stanley Van den Eynde was also a footballer, also playing for Beerschot. Their family was closely involved with the club. Their family house was located on Della Faillelaan in Antwerp.

== Honours ==
Beerschot

- Belgian First Division runner-up: 1936–37

== See also ==
- List of Belgium Davis Cup team representatives
