= Henry Billington =

British tennis player

- Country (sports): United Kingdom
- Born: 12 November 1908 Roundway, Wiltshire, England
- Died: 29 November 1980 (aged 72) Newbury, Berkshire, England
- Turned pro: 1934 (amateur tour)
- Retired: 1956
- Plays: Right-handed (one-handed backhand)

Singles

Grand Slam singles results
- French Open: QF (1939)
- Wimbledon: 3R (1948, 1950, 1951)

Henry Billington (12 November 1908 – 29 November 1980) was a British amateur tennis player, and the maternal grandfather of former World No. 4 in singles, Tim Henman. His wife Susan Hemsted (who was often his partner in mixed doubles tournaments), mother-in-law Ellen Mary Stawell-Brown and daughter Jane Henman also played tennis to international standard.

Billington competed in singles at Wimbledon 15 times between 1934 and 1954 and also participated in the Davis Cup on three occasions. Billington reached the quarter-finals of the French Championships in 1939.

His other career singles highlights include winning the Angmering-on-Sea Open twice (1937 and 1938).
