= 1938 World Table Tennis Championships – Men's team =

1938 Swaythling Cup (men's team)
- Venue: Royal Albert Hall, Wembley Empire Pool and Sports Arena

The 1938 World Table Tennis Championships – Swaythling Cup (men's team) was the 12th edition of the men's team championship.

Hungary won the gold medal defeating Austria 5–3 in the final. Czechoslovakia and the United States claimed bronze medals.

== Swaythling Cup Final tables ==
=== Group 1 ===
| Pos | Team | P | W | L | Squad |
|---|---|---|---|---|---|
| 1 | Austria | 7 | 6 | 1 | Richard Bergmann, Helmut Goebel, Erich Kaspar, Alfred Liebster, Karl Schediwy |
| 1 | United States | 7 | 6 | 1 | Bernard Grimes, George Hendry, James McClure, Lou Pagliaro, Sol Schiff |
| 1 | England | 7 | 6 | 1 | Ernest Bubley, Eric Filby, Hyman Lurie, Maurice Bergl, Ken Hyde |
| 4 | Latvia | 7 | 4 | 3 | Arnold Oschins, Isays Joffe, Doerin Stamms |
| 5 | Poland | 7 | 3 | 4 | Samuel Schieff, Izio Rojzen, Alojzy Ehrlich, K Osmanski |
| 6 | Germany | 7 | 2 | 5 | Dieter Mauritz, Helmuth Hoffmann, Erwin Munchow |
| 7 | (Republic of Ireland) Ireland | 7 | 1 | 6 | Cyril Kemp, C.J. Hussey, J.Goldstone, H.S. Carlile |
| 8 | Wales | 7 | 0 | 7 | Roy Evans, Ken Milsom, Arthur Sadler, J Meredith, F Curtin |

=== Group 1 Play Off ===
| Pos | Team | P | W | L |
|---|---|---|---|---|
| 1 | Austria | 2 | 2 | 0 |
| 2 | United States | 2 | 1 | 1 |
| 3 | England | 2 | 0 | 2 |

=== Group 2 ===
| Pos | Team | P | W | L | Squad |
|---|---|---|---|---|---|
| 1 | (Kingdom of Hungary) Hungary | 7 | 7 | 0 | Viktor Barna, Laszlo Bellak, Ernő Földi, Tibor Házi, Ferenc Soos |
| 2 | Czechoslovakia | 7 | 6 | 1 | Miloslav Hamr, Stanislav Kolář, Adolf Šlár, Václav Tereba, Bohumil Váňa |
| 3 | France | 7 | 4 | 3 | Alexandre Agopoff, François Aguilar, Michel Haguenauer, Raoul Bedoc |
| 3 | Lithuania | 7 | 4 | 3 | Eugenijus Nikolskis, Vilius Variakojis, Vladas Dzindziliauskas |
| 3 | (Socialist Federal Republic of Yugoslavia) Yugoslavia | 7 | 4 | 3 | Max Marinko, Ladislav Hexner, Adolf Herskovic, Lovro Ratkovic, Karlo Stein |
| 6 | Belgium | 7 | 2 | 5 | André Staff, Raymond Evalenko, Roger Lejeune, Georges Rafin |
| 6 | Netherlands | 7 | 1 | 6 | Cor Du Buy, Lex Admiraal, Arie Koster |
| 6 | Egypt | 7 | 0 | 7 | Simon Bercovitz, Tawhid Helal, Hassan Abou Heif |

== Final ==
| Hungary 5 | Austria 3 | Scores |
|---|---|---|
| Házi | Bergmann | 14-21 17-21 |
| Bellak | Bergmann | 21-18 21-17 |
| Barna | Bergmann | 14-21 20-22 |
| Barna | Schediwy | 21-16 21-16 |
| Házi | Schediwy | 21-18 21-18 |
| Bellak | Liebster | 22-20 17-21 14-21 |
| Barna | Liebster | 21-10 21-18 |
| Házi | Liebster | 21-9 13-21 21-15 |

== See also ==
List of World Table Tennis Championships medalists
