= 1939 World Table Tennis Championships – Men's team =

1939 Swaythling Cup (men's team)

The 1939 World Table Tennis Championships – Swaythling Cup (men's team) was the 13th edition of the men's team championship.

Czechoslovakia won the gold medal with a perfect 10–0 match record.

== Swaythling Cup final table ==
| Pos | Team | P | W | L | Squad |
|---|---|---|---|---|---|
| 1 | Czechoslovakia | 10 | 10 | 0 | Miloslav Hamr, Rudolf Karlecek, Václav Tereba, Bohumil Váňa |
| 2 | (Socialist Federal Republic of Yugoslavia) Yugoslavia | 10 | 9 | 1 | Žarko Dolinar, Tibor Harangozo, Adolf Heršković, Ladislav Hexner, Max Marinko |
| 3 | England | 10 | 8 | 2 | Ernest Bubley, Ken Hyde, Hyman Lurie, Ken Stanley, Arthur Wilmott |
| 4 | Lithuania | 10 | 7 | 3 | Chaimas Duskesas, Eugenijus Nikolskis, Vilius Variakojis, Vladas Dzindziliauskas |
| 5 | Romania | 10 | 6 | 4 | Geza Eros, Viktor Vladone, Nicu Naumescu, A. Sighisoreanu |
| 6 | Egypt | 10 | 5 | 5 | Mansour Helmy, Marcel Geargoura, Hassan Abou Heif, Tawhid Helal, Anwar Massaoud |
| 7 | France | 10 | 4 | 6 | Michel Haguenauer, Raoul Bedoc, Jean-Claude Guérin, Alfred Lejosne |
| 8 | Greece | 10 | 3 | 7 | John Kelaidis, John Paleologou, Grigorios Leventis, Costas Kassavetis |
| 9 | India | 10 | 2 | 8 | Khurshid Kapadia, D.R. Bhasin, Arun Kumar Ghosh |
| 10 | (United Kingdom) Jewish Palestine | 10 | 1 | 9 | Shimcha Finkelstein, M. Igel, S. Weissfesch |
| 11 | Luxembourg | 10 | 0 | 10 | O. Schlafenberg, Josef Tartakower, F. Hillmann |

== See also ==
List of World Table Tennis Championships medalists
