= 1938 World Table Tennis Championships =

The 1938 World Table Tennis Championships were held in London from January 24 to January 29, 1938. The pool stages were held at the Royal Albert Hall with the finals at the Wembley Empire Pool and Sports Arena.

== Medalists ==
=== Team ===
Event	Gold	Silver	Bronze
Swaythling Cup; Men's team	Hungary; Viktor Barna; Laszlo Bellak; Ernő Földi; Tibor Házi; Ferenc Soos	Austria; Richard Bergmann; Helmut Goebel; Erich Kaspar; Alfred Liebster; Karl Schediwy	United States; Bernard Grimes; George Hendry; James McClure; Lou Pagliaro; Sol Schiff
Swaythling Cup; Men's team	Hungary; Viktor Barna; Laszlo Bellak; Ernő Földi; Tibor Házi; Ferenc Soos	Austria; Richard Bergmann; Helmut Goebel; Erich Kaspar; Alfred Liebster; Karl Schediwy	Czechoslovakia; Miloslav Hamr; Stanislav Kolář; Adolf Šlár; Václav Tereba; Bohumil Váňa
Corbillon Cup; Women's team	Czechoslovakia; Vlasta Depetrisová; Jindriska Holubkova; Marie Kettnerová; Věra Votrubcová	England; Dora Emdin; Phyllis Hodgkinson; Doris Jordan; Margaret Osborne	Austria; Zita Lemo; Gertrude Pritzi

=== Individual ===
Event	Gold	Silver	Bronze
Men's Singles	(Czechoslovakia) Bohumil Váňa	(Austria) Richard Bergmann	(Kingdom of Hungary) Viktor Barna
Men's Singles	(Czechoslovakia) Bohumil Váňa	(Austria) Richard Bergmann	(Kingdom of Hungary) Tibor Házi
Women's singles	(Austria) Gertrude Pritzi	(Czechoslovakia) Vlasta Depetrisová	(Czechoslovakia) Věra Votrubcová
Women's singles	(Austria) Gertrude Pritzi	(Czechoslovakia) Vlasta Depetrisová	(United States) Betty Henry
Men's Doubles	(United States) James McClure (United States) Sol Schiff	(Kingdom of Hungary) Viktor Barna (Kingdom of Hungary) Laszlo Bellak	(Czechoslovakia) Stanislav Kolář (Czechoslovakia) Václav Tereba
Men's Doubles	(United States) James McClure (United States) Sol Schiff	(Kingdom of Hungary) Viktor Barna (Kingdom of Hungary) Laszlo Bellak	(England) Eric Filby (England) Hyman Lurie
Women's Doubles	(Czechoslovakia) Vlasta Depetrisová (Czechoslovakia) Věra Votrubcová	(Kingdom of Hungary) Dora Beregi (Kingdom of Hungary) Ida Ferenczy	(England) Phyllis Hodgkinson (England) Doris Jordan
Women's Doubles	(Czechoslovakia) Vlasta Depetrisová (Czechoslovakia) Věra Votrubcová	(Kingdom of Hungary) Dora Beregi (Kingdom of Hungary) Ida Ferenczy	(England) Dora Emdin (England) Margaret Osborne
Mixed Doubles	(Kingdom of Hungary) Laszlo Bellak (England) Wendy Woodhead	(Czechoslovakia) Bohumil Váňa (Czechoslovakia) Věra Votrubcová	(Austria) Alfred Liebster (Austria) Gertrude Pritzi
Mixed Doubles	(Kingdom of Hungary) Laszlo Bellak (England) Wendy Woodhead	(Czechoslovakia) Bohumil Váňa (Czechoslovakia) Věra Votrubcová	(Czechoslovakia) Václav Tereba (Czechoslovakia) Marie Kettnerová
