= 1938 World Table Tennis Championships – Men's doubles =

1938 Men's doubles
- Venue: London

The 1938 World Table Tennis Championships men's doubles was the 12th edition of the men's doubles championship. Jimmy McClure and Sol Schiff won the title after defeating Viktor Barna and Laszlo Bellak in the final by three sets to two. It was McClure's third consecutive title.

== Results ==
Round of 16
(Egypt) Amin Abou Heif (Egypt) Hassan Abou Heif	8	16	17
(Austria) Erich Kaspar (Poland) Shimcha Finkelstein	21	21	21
(Czechoslovakia) Miloslav Hamr (Czechoslovakia) Bohumil Váňa	18	16	19
(Kingdom of Hungary) Laszlo Bellak (Kingdom of Hungary) Viktor Barna	21	21	21
(United States) Gilbert Marshall (England) Charles Seaman	1
(United States) Bernard Grimes (United States) Lou Pagliaro	3
(England) Eric Filby (England) Hyman Lurie	21	13	21	21
(Czechoslovakia) Adolf Šlár (Czechoslovakia) František Hanec Pivec	19	21	13	12
(Czechoslovakia) Václav Tereba (Czechoslovakia) Stanislav Kolář	3
(Poland) Samuel Schieff (Poland) Alojzy Ehrlich	1
(Belgium) André Staf (Belgium) Roger Lejeune	19	12	17
(Kingdom of Hungary) István Boros (Kingdom of Hungary) Tibor Házi	21	21	21
(Austria) Alfred Liebster (Austria) Karl Schediwy	21	21	21
(Socialist Federal Republic of Yugoslavia) Adolf Herskovic (Socialist Federal Republic of Yugoslavia) Lovro Ratkovic	16	8	15
(United States) Jimmy McClure (United States) Sol Schiff	17	21	21	12	21
(Kingdom of Hungary) Ferenc Soos (Kingdom of Hungary) Ernő Földi	21	18	12	21	12

Quarterfinals
(Austria) Kaspar (Poland) Finkelstein	1
(Kingdom of Hungary) Bellak (Kingdom of Hungary) Barna	3
(United States) Grimes (United States) Pagliaro	2
(England) Filby (England) Lurie	3
(Czechoslovakia) Kolář (Czechoslovakia) Tereba	3
(Kingdom of Hungary) Boros (Kingdom of Hungary) Házi	0
(Austria) Libester (Austria) Schediwy	1
(United States) McClure (United States) Schiff	3

Semifinals
(Kingdom of Hungary) Bellak (Kingdom of Hungary) Barna	3
(England) Filby (England) Lurie	1
(Czechoslovakia) Kolář (Czechoslovakia) Tereba	2
(United States) McClure (United States) Schiff	3

Final
(Kingdom of Hungary) Bellak (Kingdom of Hungary) Barna	18	21	21	14	19
(United States) McClure (United States) Schiff	21	15	19	21	21

== See also ==
List of World Table Tennis Championships medalists
