= 1939 World Table Tennis Championships =

The 1939 World Table Tennis Championships were held in Cairo from March 6 to March 11, 1939.

Only 11 men's teams and 5 women's teams entered the Championships. Hungary, the United States and Austria were the major nations missing. Viktor Barna and Richard Bergmann played under the England flag for the first time.

== Medalists ==
=== Team ===
Event	Gold	Silver	Bronze
Swaythling Cup; Men's team	Czechoslovakia; Miloslav Hamr; Rudolf Karlecek; Václav Tereba; Bohumil Váňa	Yugoslavia; Žarko Dolinar; Tibor Harangozo; Adolf Heršković; Ladislav Hexner; Maks Marinko	England; Ernest Bubley; Ken Hyde; Hyman Lurie; Ken Stanley; Arthur Wilmott
Corbillon Cup; Women's team	Germany; Hilde Bussmann; Gertrude Pritzi	Czechoslovakia; Vlasta Depetrisová; Marie Kettnerová; Věra Votrubcová	Romania; Angelica Adelstein; Sári Kolozsvári

=== Individual ===
Event	Gold	Silver	Bronze
Men's Singles	(England) Richard Bergmann	(Poland) Alojzy Ehrlich	(Czechoslovakia) Bohumil Váňa
Men's Singles	(England) Richard Bergmann	(Poland) Alojzy Ehrlich	(Kingdom of Yugoslavia) Žarko Dolinar
Women's singles	(Czechoslovakia) Vlasta Depetrisová	(Nazi Germany) Gertrude Pritzi	(Egypt) Samiha Naili
Women's singles	(Czechoslovakia) Vlasta Depetrisová	(Nazi Germany) Gertrude Pritzi	(Czechoslovakia) Marie Kettnerová
Men's Doubles	(England) Viktor Barna (England) Richard Bergmann	(Czechoslovakia) Miloslav Hamr (Luxembourg) Josef Tartakower	(England) Ken Hyde (England) Hyman Lurie
Men's Doubles	(England) Viktor Barna (England) Richard Bergmann	(Czechoslovakia) Miloslav Hamr (Luxembourg) Josef Tartakower	(France) Raoul Bedoc (France) Michel Haguenauer
Women's Doubles	(Nazi Germany) Hilde Bussmann (Nazi Germany) Gertrude Pritzi	(Romania) Angelica Adelstein (Romania) Sári Kolozsvári	(Czechoslovakia) Vlasta Depetrisová (Czechoslovakia) Věra Votrubcová
Women's Doubles	(Nazi Germany) Hilde Bussmann (Nazi Germany) Gertrude Pritzi	(Romania) Angelica Adelstein (Romania) Sári Kolozsvári	(Czechoslovakia) Marie Kettnerová (Egypt) Samiha Naili
Mixed Doubles	(Czechoslovakia) Bohumil Váňa (Czechoslovakia) Věra Votrubcová	(Czechoslovakia) Václav Tereba (Czechoslovakia) Marie Kettnerová	(Egypt) Marcel Geargoura (Nazi Germany) Hilde Bussmann
Mixed Doubles	(Czechoslovakia) Bohumil Váňa (Czechoslovakia) Věra Votrubcová	(Czechoslovakia) Václav Tereba (Czechoslovakia) Marie Kettnerová	(Egypt) Mansour Helmy (Nazi Germany) Gertrude Pritzi
