= 1939 World Table Tennis Championships – Men's doubles =

1939 Men's doubles

The 1939 World Table Tennis Championships men's doubles was the 13th edition of the men's doubles championship. Viktor Barna and Richard Bergmann won the title after defeating Miloslav Hamr and Josef Tartakower in the final by three sets to two.

Only 11 men's teams and 5 women's teams entered the Championships. Hungary, the United States and Austria were the major nations missing. The eventual doubles champions Viktor Barna and Richard Bergmann played under the England flag for the first time after fleeing the Nazis in Europe.

== Results ==
Round of 16
(England) Hyman Lurie (England) Ken Hyde	3
(Czechoslovakia) Václav Tereba (Czechoslovakia) Bohumil Váňa	1
(Egypt) Simon Bercovitz (Egypt) E Ades	3
(Egypt) Said Hegazi (Egypt) E Gahjah	1
(Egypt) Hassan Abou Heif (Egypt) Amin Abou Heif	1
(Greece) Grigorios Leventis (Greece) Konstantinos Kassavetis	3
(Hungary) Viktor Barna (England) Richard Bergmann	3
(Lithuania) Vilius Variakojis (Lithuania) Eugenijus Nikolskis	0
(France) Michel Haguenauer (France) Raoul Bedoc	3
(Socialist Federal Republic of Yugoslavia) Ladislav Hexner (Socialist Federal Republic of Yugoslavia) Žarko Dolinar	0
(England) Ernest Bubley (England) Ken Stanley	3
(Egypt) Marcel Geargoura (Egypt) Anwar Massaoud	0
(Czechoslovakia) Miloslav Hamr (Luxembourg) Josef Tartakower	3
(Poland) Shimcha Finkelstein (Egypt) Mansour Helmy	1
(Egypt) Tawid Helal (Poland) Alojzy Ehrlich	3
(Czechoslovakia) Rudolf Karlecek (Czechoslovakia) Zdeněk Heydušek	0

Quarterfinals
(England) Lurie (England) Hyde	3
(Egypt) Bercovitz (Egypt) Ades	1
(Greece) Laventis (Greece) Kassavetis	0
(Hungary) Barna (England) Bergmann	3
(France) Haguenauer (France) Bedoc	3
(England) Bubley (England) Stanley	0
(Czechoslovakia) Hamr (Luxembourg) Tartakower	3
(Egypt) Helal (Poland) Alojzy Ehrlich	1

Semifinals
(England) Lurie (England) Hyde	2
(England) Barna (England) Bergmann	3
(France) Haguenauer (France) Bedoc	1
(Czechoslovakia) Hamr (Luxembourg) Tartakower	3

Final
(England) Barna (England) Bergmann	21	21	21
(Czechoslovakia) Hamr (Luxembourg) Tartakower	9	11	12

== See also ==
List of World Table Tennis Championships medalists
