= 1938 World Table Tennis Championships – Women's team =

1938 Corbillon Cup (women's team)
- Venue: Royal Albert Hall, Wembley Empire Pool and Sports Arena

The 1938 World Table Tennis Championships – Corbillon Cup (women's team) was the fifth edition of the women's team championship.

Czechoslovakia won the gold medal after finishing with a perfect 9–0 match record.

== Corbillon Cup final table ==
Pos	Team	P	W	L	Squad
1	Czechoslovakia	9	9	0	Vlasta Depetrisová, Jindriska Holubkova, Marie Kettnerová, Věra Votrubcová
2	England	9	8	1	Dora Emdin, Phyllis Hodgkinson, Doris Jordan, Margaret Osborne
3	Austria	9	7	2	Zita Lemo, Gertrude Pritzi
4	(Kingdom of Hungary) Hungary	9	5	4	Dora Beregi, Ida Ferenczy, Magda Gál, Anna Sipos
4	Wales	9	5	4	Audrey Bates, Nancy Evans Roy, Dolly Evans
4	United States	9	5	4	Clara Harrison, Betty Henry, Mildred Wilkinson
7	France	9	3	6	Maruchka Azcue, Marie-Louise Chalamel, Jeanne Delay, Ginette Soulage
8	Belgium	9	2	7	Dolly Coucke, Nina De Gryse, Marie-Josee Schaal, B De Fosse
9	(Republic of Ireland) Ireland	9	1	8	Tessie Whelan, Evelyn Yeates
10	Netherlands	9	0	9	A Coelen, T Kiek

== See also ==
List of World Table Tennis Championships medalists
