= 1939 World Table Tennis Championships – Mixed doubles =

1939 Mixed doubles

The 1939 World Table Tennis Championships mixed doubles was the 13th edition of the mixed doubles championship.

Bohumil Váňa and Věra Votrubcová defeated Václav Tereba and Marie Kettnerová in the final by three sets to two.

== Results ==
Round of 16
(Egypt) E. Lagnado (Egypt) Celine Nackab	0
(England) Richard Bergmann (Egypt) Samiha Naili	3
(Czechoslovakia) Václav Tereba (Czechoslovakia) Marie Kettnerová	3
(England) Hyman Lurie (Egypt) L. Tadros	0
(Egypt) Marcel Geargoura (Nazi Germany) Hilde Bussmann	3
(Czechoslovakia) Miloslav Hamr (Czechoslovakia) Vlasta Depetrisová	1
(Egypt) Hassan Abou Heif (Egypt) Mabel Kressat	3
(France) Raoul Bedoc (Egypt) K. Sciuto	2
(England) Viktor Barna (Egypt) O. Pesarini	12	21	13	21	21
(Poland) Alojzy Ehrlich (Egypt) Lina Costantinidis	21	19	19	15	5
(Czechoslovakia) Bohumil Váňa (Czechoslovakia) Věra Votrubcová	3
(Romania) Geza Eros (Romania) Angelica Adelstein	0
(Egypt) Mansour Helmy (Nazi Germany) Gertrude Pritzi	21	21	21
(England) Arthur Wilmott (England) K. White	9	7	5
(Egypt) Tawid Helal (Egypt) Doreya Karim Fahmy	3
(Egypt) Karlo Stein (Egypt) A. Cohen	1

Quarterfinals
(England) Bergmann (Egypt) Naili	0
(Czechoslovakia) Tereba (Czechoslovakia) Kettnerová	3
(Egypt) Geargoura (Nazi Germany) Bussmann	3
(Egypt) Abou Heif (Egypt) Kressat	1
(England) Barna (Egypt) Pesarini	15	9	12
(Czechoslovakia) Váňa (Czechoslovakia) Votrubcová	21	21	21
(Egypt) Helmy (Nazi Germany) Pritzi	3
(Egypt) Helal (Egypt) Fahmy	0

Semifinals
(Czechoslovakia) Tereba (Czechoslovakia) Kettnerová	3
(Egypt) Geargoura (Nazi Germany) Bussmann	1
(Czechoslovakia) Váňa (Czechoslovakia) Votrubcová	3
(Egypt) Helmy (Nazi Germany) Pritzi	1

Final
(Czechoslovakia) Tereba (Czechoslovakia) Kettnerová	13	17	22	11
(Czechoslovakia) Váňa (Czechoslovakia) Votrubcová	21	21	20	21

== See also ==
List of World Table Tennis Championships medalists
