= 1938 World Table Tennis Championships – Mixed doubles =

1938 Mixed doubles
- Venue: Royal Albert Hall, Wembley Empire Pool and Sports Arena

The 1938 World Table Tennis Championships mixed doubles was the 12th edition of the mixed doubles championship.

Laszlo Bellak and Wendy Woodhead defeated Bohumil Váňa and Věra Votrubcová in the final by three sets to two.

== Results ==
Round of 16
(Czechoslovakia) Bohumil Váňa (Czechoslovakia) Věra Votrubcová	3
(England) Alec Brook (England) E Bright	0
(Kingdom of Hungary) István Boros (Kingdom of Hungary) Ida Ferenczy	w/o
(England) William Stennett (England) Elsie Carrington	scr
(United States) Sol Schiff (United States) Mildred Wilkinson	3
(Kingdom of Hungary) Ernő Földi (Kingdom of Hungary) Dora Beregi	2
(Austria) Alfred Liebster (Austria) Gertrude Pritzi	3
(Czechoslovakia) Miloslav Hamr (Czechoslovakia) Jindriska Holubcova	1
(England) Maurice Bergl (England) Jean Nicoll	0
(Czechoslovakia) Václav Tereba (Czechoslovakia) Marie Kettnerová	3
(France) Raoul Bedoc (France) Maroutchka Azcue De Lezo	1
(Kingdom of Hungary) Ferenc Soos (Kingdom of Hungary) Anna Sipos	3
(Kingdom of Hungary) Laszlo Bellak (England) Wendy Woodhead	3
(Kingdom of Hungary) Viktor Barna (England) Dora Emdin	2
(Czechoslovakia) Adolf Šlár (Czechoslovakia) Vlasta Depetrisová	3
(England) Ken Hyde (England) Phyllis Hodgkinson	1

Quarterfinals
(Czechoslovakia) Váňa (Czechoslovakia) Votrubcová	3
(Kingdom of Hungary) Boros (Kingdom of Hungary) Ferenczy	0
(United States) Schiff (United States) Wilkinson	21	13	21	19	16
(Austria) Liebster (Austria) Pritzi	14	21	18	21	21
(Czechoslovakia) Tereba (Czechoslovakia) Kettnerová	3
(Kingdom of Hungary) Soos (Kingdom of Hungary) Sipos	2
(Kingdom of Hungary) Bellak (England) Woodhead	3
(Czechoslovakia) Šlár (Czechoslovakia) Depetrisová	0

Semifinals
(Czechoslovakia) Váňa (Czechoslovakia) Votrubcová	21	22	21
(Austria) Liebster (Austria) Pritzi	17	20	15
(Czechoslovakia) Tereba (Czechoslovakia) Kettnerová	21	15	15	10
(Kingdom of Hungary) Bellak (England) Woodhead	18	21	21	21

Final
(Czechoslovakia) Váňa (Czechoslovakia) Votrubcová	14	21	13	21	20
(Kingdom of Hungary) Bellak (England) Woodhead	21	16	21	18	22

== See also ==
List of World Table Tennis Championships medalists
