= 1938 World Table Tennis Championships – Women's doubles =

1938 Women's doubles
- Venue: Royal Albert Hall, Wembley Empire Pool and Sports Arena

The 1938 World Table Tennis Championships women's doubles was the eleventh edition of the women's doubles championship. Věra Votrubcová and Vlasta Depetrisová defeated Dora Beregi and Ida Ferenczy in the final by three sets to one.

== Results ==
Round of 16
(England) Margaret Osborne (England) Dora Emdin	20	22	21	21
(United States) Clara Harrison (United States) Mildred Wilkinson	22	20	12	15
(England) Vera Dace (England) Connie Oustainge	15	21	21	22	21
(England) S. Lavenbergs (England) Daphne Roberts	21	19	17	24	14
(Czechoslovakia) Marie Kettnerová (Czechoslovakia) Jindriska Holubkova	21	20	21	21
(France) Raymonde Parri (France) Alice Renault	8	22	14	13
(Kingdom of Hungary) Ida Ferenczy (Kingdom of Hungary) Dora Beregi	21	21	21
(England) J. Render (England) C.A. White	12	4	11
(Kingdom of Hungary) Anna Sipos (Kingdom of Hungary) Magda Gál	21	21	19	21
(Wales) Dolly Evans (Wales) B Morgan	19	18	21	14
(England) E. Bright (England) Joan Harding	9	9	17
(Czechoslovakia) Věra Votrubcová (Czechoslovakia) Vlasta Depetrisová	21	21	21
(England) Doris Emdin (Wales) Nancy Evans-Roy	21	21	20	21
(France) Maruchka Azcue (France) Marie-Louise Chalamel	18	16	22	16
(United States) Betty Henry (England) Elizabeth Steventon	21	10	19	20
(England) Doris Jordan (England) Phyllis Hodgkinson	18	21	21	22

Quarterfinals
(England) Emdin (England) Osborne	3
(England) Dace (England) Oustainge	0
(Czechoslovakia) Kettnerová (Czechoslovakia) Holubkova	17	14	22
(Kingdom of Hungary) Beregi (Kingdom of Hungary) Ferenczy	21	21	24
(Kingdom of Hungary) Sipos (Kingdom of Hungary) Gál	0
(Czechoslovakia) Votrubcová (Czechoslovakia) Depetrisová	3
(England) Emdin (Wales) Evans	0
(England) Jordan (England) Hodgkinson	3

Semifinals
(England) Emdin (England) Osborne	1
(Kingdom of Hungary) Beregi (Kingdom of Hungary) Ferenczy	3
(Czechoslovakia) Votrubcová (Czechoslovakia) Depetrisová	3
(England) Jordan (England) Hodgkinson	0

Final
(Kingdom of Hungary) Beregi (Kingdom of Hungary) Ferenczy	23	13	21	18
(Czechoslovakia) Votrubcová (Czechoslovakia) Depetrisová	25	21	18	21

== See also ==
- List of World Table Tennis Championships medalists
