= 1938 World Table Tennis Championships – Women's singles =

1938 Women's singles
- Venue: Royal Albert Hall, Wembley Empire Pool and Sports Arena

The 1938 World Table Tennis Championships women's singles was the 12th edition of the women's singles championship. Gertrude Pritzi defeated Vlasta Depetrisová in the final by three sets to nil to win the title.

== Results ==
Round of 16
(Austria) Gertrude Pritzi	21	21	21
(Wales) Clara Waldsworth	9	14	13
(England) Margaret Osborne	21	17	21	21
(England) Wendy Woodhead	13	21	9	12
(Hungary) Anna Sipos	21	21	21
(Belgium) Dolly Coucke	14	12	19
(Czechoslovakia) Věra Votrubcová	21	25	20	21
(England) Doris Jordan	7	23	22	11
(United States) Betty Henry	23	6	21	21
(England) Phyllis Hodgkinson	21	21	13	11
(England) Doris Emdin	21	17	11	21	28
(Czechoslovakia) Jindriska Holubkova	12	21	21	17	26
(Czechoslovakia) Vlasta Depetrisová	21	21	21
(England) Jean Nicoll	13	18	14
(Hungary) Dora Beregi	21	21	21
(Republic of Ireland) Tessie Whelan	11	17	18

Quarterfinals
(Austria) Pritzi	21	21	21
(England) Osborne	16	8	17
(Hungary) Sipos	18	17	16
(Czechoslovakia) Votrubcová	21	21	21
(United States) Henry	21	21	19	4	21
(England) Emdin	9	17	21	21	8
(Czechoslovakia) Depetrisová	21	21	21
(Hungary) Beregi	17	16	13

Semifinals
(Austria) Pritzi	21	21	21
(Czechoslovakia) Votrubcová	13	15	17
(United States) Henry	11	3	12
(Czechoslovakia) Depetrisová	21	21	21

Final
(Austria) Pritzi	21	21	21
(Czechoslovakia) Depetrisová	13	13	17

== See also ==
List of World Table Tennis Championships medalists
