= 1938 World Table Tennis Championships – Men's singles =

Sports event

1938 Men's singles
- Venues: Royal Albert Hall, Wembley Empire Pool and Sports Arena

The 1938 World Table Tennis Championships men's singles was the 12th edition of the men's singles championship.

Bohumil Váňa defeated Richard Bergmann in the final, winning three sets to one to secure the title.

== Results ==
Round of 16
(United States) Sol Schiff	21	21	21
(Lithuania) Chimas Duskesas	9	14	18
(Hungary) Tibor Házi	20	21	20	21	25
(Czechoslovakia) Miloslav Hamr	22	17	22	17	23
(Hungary) Richard Bergmann	21	21	14	24
(Hungary) Ferenc Soos	16	17	21	22
(Czechoslovakia) Adolf Šlár	21	21	21
(England) D.J.C. Cairns	8	9	14
(Socialist Federal Republic of Yugoslavia) Max Marinko	3
(England) Charles Seaman	0
(Czechoslovakia) Bohumil Váňa	21	21	21
(United States) Bernard Grimes	14	8	13
(Hungary) Viktor Barna	21	21	21
(Germany) Dieter Mauritz	15	10	13
(Czechoslovakia) Václav Tereba	21	21	21
(United States) Lou Pagliaro	15	18	11

Quarterfinals
(United States) Schiff	16	20	19
(Hungary) Házi	21	22	21
(Austria) Bergmann	21	21	21
(Czechoslovakia) Slar	9	14	15
(Socialist Federal Republic of Yugoslavia) Marinko	21	21	21
(Czechoslovakia) Váňa	11	15	16
(Hungary) Barna	21	21	21	24
(Czechoslovakia) Tereba	14	16	23	22

Semifinals
(Hungary) Hazi	12	11	12
(Austria) Bergmann	21	21	21
(Czechoslovakia) Váňa	21	21	21
(Hungary) Barna	16	19	17

Final
(Austria) Bergmann	22	9	16	14
(Czechoslovakia) Váňa	20	21	21	21

== See also ==
List of World Table Tennis Championships medalists
