= 1939 World Table Tennis Championships – Men's singles =

1939 Men's singles

The 1939 World Table Tennis Championships men's singles was the 13th edition of the men's singles championship.

Richard Bergmann defeated Alojzy Ehrlich in the final, winning three sets to nil to secure the title. The eventual champion Bergmann and former winner Viktor Barna both represented England after fleeing the Nazis in Europe.

Only 11 men's teams and 5 women's teams entered the Championships. Hungary, the United States and Austria were the major nations missing.

== Results ==
Round of 16
(Czechoslovakia) Bohumil Váňa	3
(Luxembourg) Josef Tartakower	1
(France) Michel Haguenauer	3
(Romania) Viktor Vladone	0
(England) Ken Hyde	3
(Poland) Shimcha Finkelstein	0
(England) Richard Bergmann	3
(Romania) Geza Eros	0
(Hungary) Viktor Barna	3
(Czechoslovakia) Václav Tereba	2
(Poland) Alojzy Ehrlich	3
(England) Hyman Lurie	0
(Lithuania) Vladas Dzindziliauskas	3
(Egypt) Tawid Helal	0
(Socialist Federal Republic of Yugoslavia) Žarko Dolinar	3
(Egypt) Marcel Geargoura	2

Quarterfinals
(Czechoslovakia) Váňa	3
(France) Haguenauer	0
(England) Hyde	0
(England) Bergmann	3
(Hungary) Barna	0
(Poland) Erlich	3
(Lithuania) Dzindziliauskas	0
(Socialist Federal Republic of Yugoslavia) Dolinar	3

Semifinals
(Czechoslovakia) Váňa	13	20	21	21	19
(England) Bergmann	21	22	15	15	21
(Poland) Erlich	21	21	21
(Socialist Federal Republic of Yugoslavia) Dolinar	18	10	14

Final
(England) Bergmann	21	21	21
(Poland) Erlich	7	15	18

== See also ==
List of World Table Tennis Championships medalists
