= 1939 World Table Tennis Championships – Women's doubles =

1939 Women's doubles

The 1939 World Table Tennis Championships women's doubles was the 12th edition of the women's doubles championship. Gertrude Pritzi and Hilde Bussmann defeated Sári Kolosvari and Angelica Adelstein in the final by three sets to nil.

After the annexation of Austria by Germany, the Austrian Pritzi had to participate under the Nazi Germany flag.

== Results ==
Round of 16
(Czechoslovakia) Věra Votrubcová (Czechoslovakia) Vlasta Depetrisová	w/o
(Egypt) Spectoroff (Egypt) Passfitis	scr
(Egypt) Perackis (Egypt) O. Pesarini
(Egypt) Namek (Egypt) H. Cherine
(Egypt) Celine Nackab (Egypt) L. Tadros
(Egypt) K. Sciuto (Egypt) A. Bellanti
(Nazi Germany) Gertrude Pritzi (Nazi Germany) Hilde Bussmann
(Egypt) L. Cherine (Egypt) R. Cherine
(Romania) Sári Kolosvari (Romania) Angelica Adelstein
(Egypt) Kadiga Abou Heif Rifaat (Egypt) I. Choulhot
(Egypt) Lina Costantinidis (Egypt) Francis
(Egypt) Mabel Kressat (Egypt) Doreya Karim Fahmy
(Egypt) Mafera (Egypt) Aghion
(Czechoslovakia) Marie Kettnerová (Egypt) Samiha Naili
(Egypt) Smart (Egypt) Cohen

Quarterfinals
(Czechoslovakia) Votrubcová (Czechoslovakia) Depetrisová	3
(Egypt) Perackis (Egypt) Pesarini	0
(Egypt) Sciuto (Egypt) Bellanti	0
(Nazi Germany) Pritzi (Nazi Germany) Bussmann	3
(Romania) Kolosvari (Romania) Adelstein	w/o
(Egypt) Rifaat (Egypt) I. Choulhot	scr
(Egypt) Kressat (Egypt) Karim Fahmy	0
(Czechoslovakia) Kettnerová (Egypt) Naili	3

Semifinals
(Czechoslovakia) Votrubcová (Czechoslovakia) Depetrisová	1
(Nazi Germany) Pritzi (Nazi Germany) Bussmann	3
(Romania) Kolosvari (Romania) Adelstein	3
(Czechoslovakia) Kettnerová (Egypt) Naili	1

Final
(Nazi Germany) Pritzi (Nazi Germany) Bussmann	21	21	21
(Romania) Kolosvari (Romania) Adelstein	17	15	15

== See also ==
List of World Table Tennis Championships medalists
