= 1939 World Table Tennis Championships – Women's team =

1939 Corbillon Cup (women's team)

The 1939 World Table Tennis Championships – Corbillon Cup (women's team) was the sixth edition of the women's team championship.

Germany won the gold medal in a drastically reduced competition with only five teams taking part.

== Final table ==
Pos	Team	P	W	L	Squad
1	(Nazi Germany) Germany	4	4	0	Hilde Bussmann, Gertrude Pritzi
2	Czechoslovakia	4	3	1	Vlasta Depetrisová, Marie Kettnerová, Věra Votrubcová
3	Romania	4	2	2	Angelica Adelstein, Sári Kolozsvári
4	Egypt	4	1	3	Samiha Naili, Mabel Kressat, Lina Costantinidis, Doreya Karim Fahmy
5	(United Kingdom) Jewish Palestine	4	0	4	E.Segal, I Diennes, I.Shpilman

== See also ==
- List of World Table Tennis Championships medalists
