= 1939 World Table Tennis Championships – Women's singles =

1939 Women's singles

The 1939 World Table Tennis Championships women's singles was the 13th edition of the women's singles championship. Vlasta Depetrisová defeated Gertrude Pritzi in the final by three sets to two, to win the title. The tournament suffered from lack of entries due to the troubles in Europe and the forthcoming World War II. Only 11 men's teams and 5 women's teams entered the Championships. Hungary, the United States and Austria were the major nations missing.

After the annexation of Austria by Germany, the Austrian Pritzi had to participate under the Nazi Germany flag.

== Results ==
Round of 16
(Czechoslovakia) Věra Votrubcová
w/o
(Nazi Germany) Gertrude Pritzi	3
(Egypt) Lina Costantinidis	0
(Czechoslovakia) Marie Kettnerová	3
(Romania) Sári Kolosvari	0
(Egypt) Mabel Kressat	3
(Egypt) A. Bellanti	2
(Czechoslovakia) Vlasta Depetrisová	w/o
(Romania) Angelica Adelstein	2
(Nazi Germany) Hilde Bussmann	1+
(Egypt) Doreya Karim Fahmy
(Egypt) Samiha Naili	3
(Egypt) O. Pesarini	0

Quarterfinals
(Czechoslovakia) Votrubcová	1
(Nazi Germany) Pritzi	3
(Czechoslovakia) Kettnerová	3
(Egypt) Kressati	0
(Czechoslovakia) Depetrisová	3
(Romania) Adelstein	1
(Egypt) Fahmy	0
(Egypt) Naili	3

Semifinals
(Nazi Germany) Pritzi	21	22	21
(Czechoslovakia) Kettnerová	10	20	19
(Czechoslovakia) Depetrisová	22	21	21
(Egypt) Naili	20	12	19

Final
(Nazi Germany) Pritzi	19	21	21	19	9
(Czechoslovakia) Depetrisová	21	16	16	21	21

+ withdrew

== See also ==
List of World Table Tennis Championships medalists
