= George Hendry =

American table tennis player

Personal information
- Nationality: United States
- Born: September 2, 1920 St. Louis
- Died: August 17, 2011 (aged 90) St. Louis
Medal record
Representing United States
World Table Tennis Championships
Bronze medal – third place	1938	Men's Team

George Jack Hendry (1920–2011) was a male international table tennis player from the United States.

== Table tennis career ==
He won a bronze medal at the 1938 World Table Tennis Championships in the Swaythling Cup (men's team event) with Bernard Grimes, James McClure, Lou Pagliaro and Sol Schiff for the United States.

He won a first national junior championships in 1935. He reached an American national high ranking of 2 in the singles and 1 in the doubles. He later won 35 national seniors championships.

== See also ==
- List of table tennis players
- List of World Table Tennis Championships medalists
