= Tibor Harangozo =

Yugoslav table tennis player

Personal information
- Nationality: Yugoslavia
- Born: 1922
- Died: 1978 (aged 55–56)
Medal record
Representing Yugoslavia
World Table Tennis Championships
Silver medal – second place	1939 Cairo	team

Tibor Harangozo (Hungarian: Harangozó Tibor, Serbian Cyrillic: Тибор Харангозо) was a male Yugoslav international table tennis player.

== Table tennis career ==
He won a silver medal at the 1939 World Table Tennis Championships in the Swaythling Cup (men's team event) with Žarko Dolinar, Adolf Heršković, Ladislav Hexner and Max Marinko for Yugoslavia.

== Personal life ==
His younger brother Vilim Harangozo (1925–1975) was also an international table tennis player.

In 1969 Tibor Harangozo opened a shop for table tennis accessories in Saarbrücken, Germany, which was named Tibhar after him. Tibhar Tibor Harangozo GmbH has since become one of the main global table tennis brands

== See also ==
- List of table tennis players
- List of World Table Tennis Championships medalists
