= Adolf Herskovic =

Table tennis player

Adolf Allan Herskovic
Personal information
- Nationality: Yugoslavia; Italy; United States
- Born: Adolf Heršković; 20 April 1916 Zagreb, Kingdom of Croatia-Slavonia, Austria-Hungary
- Died: 26 February 2011 (aged 94) El Cerrito, California, United States

Sport
- Sport: Table tennis
- Club: Maccabi Zagreb (1937–1941); Jewish Athletic Club
Medal record
Representing Yugoslavia
World Table Tennis Championships
Silver medal – second place	1939 Cairo	Team

Adolf "Dolfi" Herskovic (né Heršković; later Allan Herskovic; 20 April 1916 – 26 February 2011) was an international table tennis player born in Croatia who competed for Yugoslavia in the 1930s, Italy in the 1940s and the United States in the 1970s.

== Early life ==
Born in 1916 in Zagreb into a Croatian Jewish family, in what was then Kingdom of Croatia-Slavonia within Austria-Hungary, Heršković first started doing sports in the interwar period at the local Maccabi Zagreb Jewish sports society, which was at the time the most successful Jewish sports club in the Kingdom of Yugoslavia.

As a member of Maccabi Zagreb in the late 1930s Heršković rose to prominence as one of the best players in Yugoslavia, and competed with the national team at the 1937, 1938, and 1939 World Championships. In the 1938–39 season he was Yugoslav champion in mixed doubles, paired with Alica Florijan, and was champion of the regional Sava Banovina championship in 1939.

His best result with Yugoslavia was the silver medal won at the 1939 tournament held in Cairo, in the Swaythling Cup (men's team event), along with teammates Žarko Dolinar, Ladislav Hexner, Tibor Harangozo and Max Marinko. Hexner, Dolinar and Marinko were all members of the Zagreb-based HAŠK, a multi-sports society affiliated with the University of Zagreb.

== Later life ==
Herskovic's father Aleksandar (né Sandor Herskovitz; 1874–1944) had moved to Croatia from Certeze, in present-day Romania, in 1901. By the 1930s he was running a wholesale textile and manufacturing business in Zagreb. After the installment of the Nazi-allied NDH regime in Croatia in 1941 his property was expropriated, and he was later deported and killed in Auschwitz. Herskovic's sister Gitta (1917–1944) also died at Auschwitz, while his younger brother Ludwig (1924–1941) was killed in Jasenovac.

During World War II Herskovic took refuge in Italy with some of his brothers, but was arrested in Asti in 1942, and was transferred to the Ferramonti internment camp near Cosenza in southern Italy, where he spent four months before being liberated by the Allies in September 1943.

After the war he lived in Turin and continued to play table tennis, and appeared in three more World Championships for Italy, in 1948, 1949, and 1950.

In his first post-war tournament, the 1948 World Table Tennis Championships in Wembley, Italy was drawn into a group with Yugoslavia, so Herskovic played against his pre-war teammate Žarko Dolinar who represented Yugoslavia, captained by another former teammate, Tibor Harangozo. Neither Italy nor Yugoslavia progressed to the semi-finals, but Max Marinko—another member of the Yugoslav silver team from 1939—won a gold medal playing for Czechoslovakia.

In the early 1950s Herskovic changed his first name to Allan, emigrated to the United States, and opened an electric shaver store in El Cerrito, California. He continued to play table tennis, and even captained the US team at the 1974 US Open.

In the United States he was a member of the Jewish Athletic Club, and also played soccer and did gymnastics.

== See also ==
- List of table tennis players
- List of World Table Tennis Championships medalists
