= Erich Kaspar =

Austrian table tennis player

Personal information
- Nationality: Austria
Medal record
Representing Austria
World Table Tennis Championships
Silver medal – second place	1938	Men's Team

Erich Kaspar is a male former international table tennis player from Austria.

== Table tennis career ==
He won a silver medal at the 1938 World Table Tennis Championships in the Swaythling Cup for Austria with Richard Bergmann, Helmut Goebel, Alfred Liebster and Karl Schediwy.

== See also ==
- List of table tennis players
- List of World Table Tennis Championships medalists
