= Myron Rolle =

American football player and physician (born 1986)

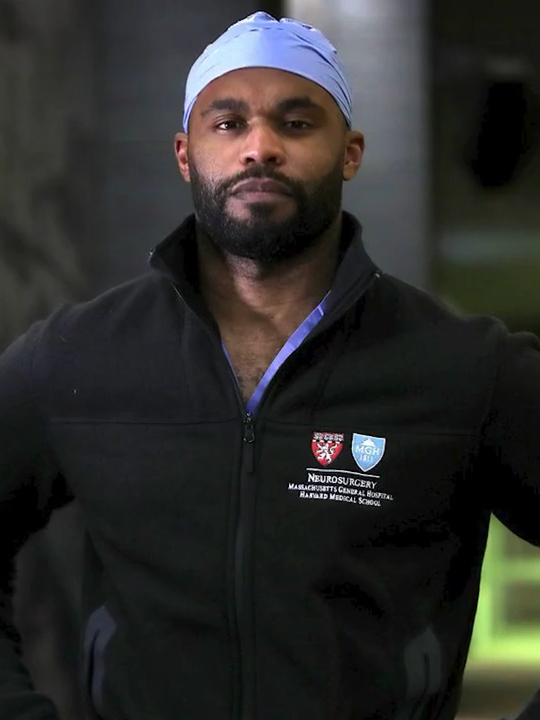
- Rolle in 2020

No. 25, 47
- Position: Safety

Personal information
- Born: October 30, 1986 (age 40); Houston, Texas, U.S.
- Listed height: 6 ft 2 in (1.88 m)
- Listed weight: 219 lb (99 kg)

Career information
- High school: Hun (Princeton, New Jersey)
- College: Oxford; Florida State
- NFL draft: 2010: 6th round, 207th overall pick

Career history
- Tennessee Titans (2010–2011)*; Pittsburgh Steelers (2012)*
- * Offseason or practice squad member only

Awards and highlights
- Third-team All-American (2008); First-team Freshman All-American (2006); ACC Defensive Rookie of the Year (2006); Watkins Award (2006); Second-team All-ACC (2008); Touchdown Club of Columbus Male Sportsman of the Year (2008)
- Stats at Pro Football Reference

Myron L. Rolle (born October 30, 1986) is an American pediatric neurosurgeon and former professional football safety. He played college football at Florida State, and was selected by the Tennessee Titans in the sixth round of the 2010 NFL draft. He attended the Florida State University College of Medicine, completed his neurosurgery residency at Harvard Medical School/Massachusetts General Hospital, his pediatric neurosurgery fellowship at Johns Hopkins All Children's Hospital in St. Petersburg, Florida, and is now a pediatric neurosurgeon at Nemours Children's Hospital, Florida in Orlando, Florida.

He was awarded a Rhodes Scholarship and studied at St. Edmund Hall, Oxford University for the 2009–10 academic year in order to earn an MSc in Medical Anthropology. In 2010, he was chosen as the second-smartest athlete in sports by the Sporting News, behind baseball player Craig Breslow. On February 17, 2021, Abiomed, a member of the S&P 500, announced Rolle as a member of its board of directors.

== Early life ==
Rolle was born in Houston, Texas. His family is from The Bahamas; and after returning to Nassau for two years after his birth, his family then moved permanently to the United States. He was raised in Galloway Township, New Jersey, where in 2009, December 10 was decreed "Myron Rolle Day". Myron attended the Peddie School in Hightstown, New Jersey, where he played the saxophone in the school band, sang in a school play, and was the sports editor of the school newspaper as well as playing football, basketball and track. He transferred to the Hun School of Princeton and played high school football and basketball. He maintained a 4.0 GPA in high school. He was an All-American and made 112 tackles including 14 for loss. ESPN's recruiting services ranked Rolle as the number one high school prospect in the country. Rivals.com rated him the 12th-best player and the top athlete overall, as well as the best player from New Jersey in the 2006 recruiting class. In 2006, after a nationwide search Rolle won the prestigious annually awarded Franklin D. Watkins Memorial Trophy, the premier African-American scholar/athlete award in America for high school males. He is an alumnus of the U.S. Army All-American Bowl.

== College football career ==
Aspiring to both the National Football League and medical school, Rolle played as a safety at FSU, completed all necessary pre-medical requirements, and earned his bachelor's degree in Exercise Science in just 2.5 years with a 3.75 grade point average. Rolle helped the Florida State Seminoles win on the field, and off the field, he won a Rhodes Scholarship. He postponed playing in the NFL for a year in order to study at Oxford University.

In 2008, he earned Associated Press 3rd team All-American honors as well as Football Writers Association America 2nd team All-ACC and CoSIDA Academic All-America. In the 2008 season game versus the University of Miami Hurricanes, Seminoles defensive coordinator Mickey Andrews remarked that Rolle played the best and most complete game he has ever seen a safety play at Florida State University in his 25 years of coaching. Rolle had 4 tackles (2 touchdown saving tackles), 1 tackle for loss, 4 pass breakups, 1 sack, 2 quarterback hurries and 3 critical 3rd down stops.

Rolle was named a finalist for one of the 32 Rhodes Scholarships awarded to Americans each year. His interview for the scholarship was originally scheduled at the same time as Florida State was to play at Maryland, in which Florida State defeated Maryland 37–3. The NCAA decided to allow Rolle to take a chartered plane from his interview in Birmingham, Alabama to College Park. He was awarded the scholarship less than three hours before the Florida State vs. Maryland game. He became the fourth Florida State student and second school athlete to receive the honor, as well as the only FSU football player to do so. Rolle announced on January 12, 2009, that he would first study at Oxford University for the 2009–10 academic year in order to earn an M.Sc. in medical anthropology and would then enter the 2010 NFL draft. He was a member of St Edmund Hall, commonly known as "Teddy Hall," at Oxford, living in college accommodation at Norham Gardens.

== Professional football career ==
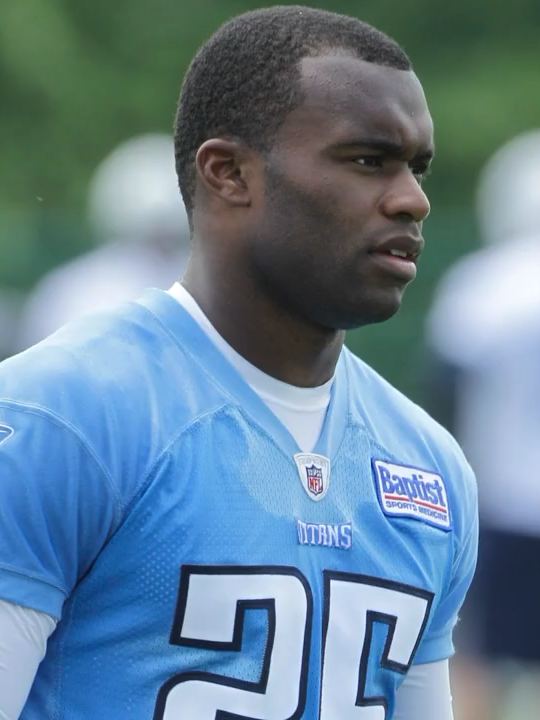
Rolle practicing with the Titans

Pre-draft measurables
| Height | Weight | Arm length | Hand span | 40-yard dash | 10-yard split | 20-yard split | 20-yard shuttle | Three-cone drill | Vertical jump | Broad jump | Bench press | Wonderlic |
|---|---|---|---|---|---|---|---|---|---|---|---|---|
| 6 ft 1 7/8 in (1.88 m) | 215 lb (98 kg) | 32 1/2 in (0.83 m) | 9 1/8 in (0.23 m) | 4.76 s | 1.69 s | 2.78 s | 4.15 s | 6.94 s | 36 in (0.91 m) | 10 ft 4 in (3.15 m) | 21 reps | 33 |
All values from NFL Combine

Rolle was selected by the Tennessee Titans in the sixth round (207th overall) of the 2010 NFL draft. He signed a four-year contract on June 14, 2010. Rolle never appeared in a regular-season game for the Titans in 2010 and 2011. He then spent a brief time with the Pittsburgh Steelers before the team released him in 2012.

== Medical career ==
Rolle announced his intent to leave the NFL to attend medical school in 2013. He enrolled at Florida State University College of Medicine and graduated in May 2017. Rolle matched to a neurosurgery residency at Massachusetts General Hospital and Harvard Medical School. Rolle was a Global Neurosurgery Fellow at Harvard Medical School. In July 2020, Rolle stated he felt that due to COVID-19 the NFL should delay or cancel the 2020 season.

== Personal life ==
He is the son of Whitney and Beverly Rolle. Myron is the youngest of five: Marchant, Marvis, Mordecai and McKinley. Rolle is the cousin of former safety Antrel Rolle, linebacker Brian Rolle, and former cornerback Samari Rolle.

Myron married pediatric dentist Dr. Latoya Legrand-Rolle in 2017. He and his wife have two sets of twins, and the family resides in Orlando, Florida. Rolle is a Christian.

He was honored with membership into Omicron Delta Kappa in 2008 at FSU.

== Bibliography ==
- Rolle, Myron L. (2022). The 2% Way: How a Philosophy of Small Improvements Took Me to Oxford, the NFL, and Neurosurgery. ISBN 978-0310363651.

== See also ==
- List of Rhodes Scholars
- List of athletes with advanced degrees
- List of Kappa Alpha Psi members
