= Bernard Grimes =

American table tennis player

Personal information
- Nationality: United States
Medal record
Representing United States
World Table Tennis Championships
Bronze medal – third place	1938	Men's Team

Bernard 'Bernie' Grimes was an international table tennis player from the United States.

== Table tennis career ==
Grimes won a bronze medal at the 1938 World Table Tennis Championships in the Swaythling Cup (men's team event) with George Hendry, James McClure, Lou Pagliaro and Sol Schiff for the United States.

Grimes was from New York.

== See also ==
- List of table tennis players
- List of World Table Tennis Championships medalists
