= Connie Oustainge =

English table tennis player

Personal information
- Nationality: England
- Born: 25 May 1917; Wembley, England
- Died: 27 July 2013; Felpham, England

Connie Oustainge (married name Connie Miles; 25 May 1917 – 27 July 2013), was a female English international table tennis player.

She captained the England team and competed in the 1938 World Table Tennis Championships and was women's doubles quarter-finalist with Vera Dace.

== See also ==
- List of table tennis players
- List of World Table Tennis Championships medalists
