= Zita Lemo =

Austrian table tennis player

Personal information
- Nationality: Austria
Medal record
Representing Austria
World Table Tennis Championships
Bronze medal – third place	1938	Women's Team

Zita Lemo was a Austrian international table tennis player.

She won a bronze medal in the Corbillon Cup (women's team event) at the 1938 World Table Tennis Championships. The team only consisted of herself and Gertrude Pritzi with the non playing captain being Robert Thum.

== See also ==
- List of table tennis players
- List of World Table Tennis Championships medalists
