= List of athletes with advanced degrees =

This is a list of athletes with advanced degrees (PhDs and other degrees at that academic level). Honorary degrees are excluded, as are degrees from unaccredited institutions of higher education.

== Research doctorate ==
Athlete	Degree	Field	Institution	Known for
Billy Arnold	PhD		MIAT College of Technology	Racecar driver and champion of the 1930 Indianapolis 500
Dave Baldwin	PhD	Genetics	University of Arizona	Major League Baseball pitcher
Harald Bohr	PhD	Mathematics	University of Copenhagen	Football player and silver medalist at the 1908 Olympic Games
Cyril Byron	EdD	Science education	Temple University	Negro league baseball player
Travis Dorsch	PhD	Sports and exercise psychology	Purdue University	National Football League punter, triathlon professor at Utah State University
Siona Fernandes	PhD	Sport, exercise, health	Auckland University of Technology	Olympic Games 2012, Boxing
Hayley Haining	PhD	Veterinary medicine	University of Glasgow	British marathon runner who competed at the 2014 Commonwealth Games
Gail Hopkins	PhD	Biology	Illinois Institute of Technology	Major League Baseball player
Tom House	PhD	Sports psychology	United States International University	Major League Baseball pitcher
Charlotte Hym	PhD	Cognitive neuroscience and Psychology	Paris Descartes University	French street skateboarder competing at the 2020 Summer Olympics
Charley Johnson	PhD	Chemical engineering	Washington University in St. Louis	NFL quarterback for the St. Louis Cardinals and Denver Broncos
Thomas Johnson	PhD	Physical education	University of Maryland, College Park	Negro league baseball player, college football coach and college baseball coach
Anna Kiesenhofer	PhD	Applied mathematics	Polytechnic University of Catalonia	2020 Olympic champion in the women's individual cycling road race
Vitali Klitschko	PhD	Sports science	Kyiv University	World champion boxer and Ukrainian politician
Wladimir Klitschko	PhD	Sports science	Kyiv University	World champion heavyweight boxer
Steve Korcheck	PhD	Education	George Washington University	Major League Baseball player
Lise Leveille	PhD	Neuroscience	University of British Columbia	French Canadian gymnast represented at the 2000 Olympic Games.
Fletcher Low	PhD	Chemistry	Columbia University	Major League Baseball player, Dartmouth College professor, New Hampshire legislator
Mike Marshall	PhD	Kinesiology or exercise physiology	Michigan State University	Cy Young Award–winning Major League Baseball pitcher
Morris Mott	PhD	Sports history	Queen's University at Kingston	National Hockey League player
Tom Osborne	PhD	Educational psychology	University of Nebraska–Lincoln	College football player, hall of fame coach, and former politician.
Shaquille O'Neal	EdD	Education	Barry University	National Basketball Association player
Emma Pooley	PhD	Geotechnical engineering	ETH Zurich	World Champion and Olympic medal-winning cyclist and triathlete
Frank Ryan	PhD	Mathematics	Rice University	National Football League quarterback
Ted Savage	PhD	Urban studies	Saint Louis University	Major League Baseball player
Wally Snell	PhD	Botany	University of Wisconsin–Madison	Major League Baseball catcher; Brown University professor and Athletic Director
Naoto Tobe	PhD	Sports science	University of Tsukuba	Japanese high jumper
Tai Tzu-ying	PhD	Sports science	University of Taipei	2020 Summer Olympic medal-winning badminton player and three-time Asian badminton champion
John Urschel	PhD	Applied mathematics	Massachusetts Institute of Technology	National Football League guard and center
Oleksandr Usyk	PhD	Law	Kharkiv University of Internal Affairs	Undisputed world champion boxer
Josie Valeri	PhD	Critical psychology	Point Park University	American professional soccer player and scholar
Deng Yaping	PhD	Land economy	University of Cambridge	Chinese table tennis player, who won eighteen world championships including four Olympic championships, and regarded as one of the greatest players in the history of this sport
Mikhail Youzhny	PhD	Philosophy	Moscow State University	Tennis player
Hugues Fabrice Zango	PhD	Electrical engineering	University of Artois	World champion and Olympic medalist, Burkinabé triple and long jumper

== Medical degree ==
In many countries, the first medical degree is the MBBS (with MD being reserved for higher doctorates), yet holders of this degree are addressed as "doctor" while practising.

Athlete	Degree	Field	Institution	Known for
Tenley Albright	MD	Medicine	Harvard Medical School	Olympic and World Champion figure skater
Jack Allen	DDS	Dental surgery	University of Pennsylvania School of Dental Medicine	Major League Baseball player
Pete Allen	MD	Medicine	College of Philadelphia Department of Medicine	Major League Baseball player, professor at Jefferson Medical College
Steve Arlin	DDS	Dental surgery	Ohio State University College of Dentistry	Major League Baseball pitcher
Mark Baldwin	MD	Medicine	Baltimore Medical College	Major League Baseball pitcher
Roger Bannister	MD	Medicine, Neurology	Exeter College, Oxford	Olympic middle-distance runner, first person to break the 4 minute mile
Walter Bernhardt	DDS	Dental surgery	University of Pennsylvania School of Dental Medicine	Major League Baseball pitcher
Bobby Brown	MD	Medicine	Tulane University School of Medicine	Major League Baseball third baseman and president of the American League
Lou Bruce	DDS	Dental surgery	Pennsylvania College of Dental Surgery	Major League Baseball player, Mohawk activist
David Bruton	DPT	Physical therapy	University of Colorado School of Medicine	National Football League safety
Doc Bushong	DDS	Dental surgery	Pennsylvania College of Dental Surgery	Major League Baseball catcher, possible inventor of the catcher's mitt, namesake of Bushong, Kansas
Billy Cannon	DDS	Dental surgery	University of Tennessee College of Dentistry	National Football League player and Heisman Trophy winner
Doc Carroll	DMD	Dental medicine	Tufts University School of Dental Medicine	Major League Baseball catcher
Tommy Casanova	MD	Medicine	University of Cincinnati College of Medicine	National Football League player
Elise Chabbey	MD	Medicine		Professional racing cyclist
Maceo Clark	MD	Medicine	Meharry Medical College	Negro League baseball pitcher
Bob Cone	MD	Medicine	University of Texas Medical Branch	Major League Baseball pitcher
Jack Darragh	DDS	Dental surgery	University of Pennsylvania School of Dental Medicine	Major League Baseball player
Terry Dischinger	DDS	Dental surgery	University of Tennessee College of Dentistry	National Basketball Association All-Star
Kevin Draxinger	MD	Medicine	University of British Columbia	Canadian backstroke swimmer at the 1992 Summer Olympics
Laurent Duvernay-Tardif	MDCM	Medicine	McGill University Faculty of Medicine	National Football League guard, Super Bowl champion
Doc Farrell	DDS	Dental surgery	University of Pennsylvania School of Dental Medicine	Major League Baseball infielder
Simon Fraser	DO	Medicine	Ohio University Heritage School of Medicine	National Football League defensive end
Moonlight Graham	MD	Medicine	Baltimore Medical College	Major League Baseball player whose life story was featured in the 1989 film Field of Dreams
Randy Gregg	MD	Medicine	University of Alberta Faculty of Medicine and Dentistry	National Hockey League player
Tom Gunning	MD	Medicine	University of Pennsylvania School of Medicine	Major League Baseball player
Mark Hamilton	MD	Medicine	Zucker School of Medicine	Major League Baseball player
Martin Hehir	MD	Medicine	Sidney Kimmel Medical College	American distance runner, anesthesiologist
Eric Heiden	MD	Medicine	Stanford University School of Medicine	American long track speed skater and five-time gold medalist at the Winter Olympics. Regarded as most successful Winter Olympian and one of 50 greatest athletes of the 20th century.
Gail Hopkins	MD	Medicine	Rush Medical College	Major League Baseball player
Les Horvath	DDS	Dental surgery	Ohio State University College of Dentistry	National Football League player and Heisman Trophy winner
Nate Hughes	MD	Medicine	University of Mississippi Medical Center	National Football League wide receiver
Doc Imlay	DDS	Dental surgery	University of Pennsylvania School of Dental Medicine	Major League Baseball pitcher
Jumping Jack Jones	DDS	Dental surgery	Harvard Dental School	Major League Baseball pitcher
Jumping Jack Jones	MD	Medicine	Yale Medical School	Major League Baseball pitcher
Greg Klazura	MD	Medicine	University of Illinois College of Medicine	Major League Soccer player
Ryan Kohlmeier	DDS	Dental surgery	University of Missouri–Kansas City School of Dentistry	Major League Baseball player
Lise Leveille	MD	Medicine	Queen's University at Kingston	French Canadian gymnast represented at the 2000 Olympic Games.
Jim Lonborg	DMD	Dental medicine	Tufts University School of Dental Medicine	Cy Young Award–winning Major League Baseball pitcher
Joel Makovicka	DPT	Physical therapy	Creighton University School of Pharmacy and Health Professions	National Football League player
Justin Maxwell	DDS	Dental surgery	University of Maryland School of Dentistry	Major League Baseball outfielder
Doc McMahon	DMD	Dental medicine	Tufts University School of Dental Medicine	Major League Baseball pitcher
Doc Medich	MD	Medicine	University of Pittsburgh School of Medicine	Major League Baseball pitcher
John Michels	MD	Medicine	USC Keck School of Medicine	National Football League tackle, Super Bowl champion
Bill Mlkvy	DMD	Dental medicine	Maurice H. Kornberg School of Dentistry	National Basketball Association player
Bill McColl	MD	Medicine, neurosurgery	Pritzker School of Medicine	National Football League player, missionary, father of Milt McColl
Milt McColl	MD	Medicine	Stanford University School of Medicine	National Football League player, son of Bill McColl
Nadia Nadim	MD	Medicine	Aarhus University	National Women's Soccer League and Denmark Women's National Football Team player
Jack Nichols	DMD	Dental medicine	Tufts University School of Dental Medicine	National Basketball Association player
Rich Nye	DVM	Veterinary medicine	University of Illinois College of Veterinary Medicine	Major League Baseball pitcher
Dip Orange	MD	Medicine	Meharry Medical College	Negro National League baseball player
Charlie Pechous	MD	Medicine	Stritch School of Medicine	Major League Baseball player
Arlie Pond	MD	Medicine	University of Vermont College of Medicine	Major League Baseball player
Bob Poser	MD	Medicine	University of Wisconsin School of Medicine and Public Health	Major League Baseball player
Joannie Rochette	MD	Medicine	McGill University Faculty of Medicine and Health Sciences	Olympic medal-winning figure skater
Myron Rolle	MD	Medicine	Florida State University College of Medicine	National Football League safety, Rhodes Scholar
Mary Rountree	MD	Medicine	Bowman Gray School of Medicine	All-American Girls Professional Baseball League player
Frank Sexton	MD	Medicine	University of Pennsylvania School of Medicine	Major League Baseball pitcher
Harvey Smith	MD	Medicine	University of Pennsylvania School of Medicine	Major League Baseball pitcher
Genevra Stone	MD	Medicine	Tufts University School of Medicine	Olympic rower
Ad Swigler	DDS	Dental surgery	University of Pennsylvania Dental School	Major League Baseball player
Thiago Tavares	MD	Medicine	University Institute of Health Sciences - Héctor A. Barceló Foundation	Mixed martial artist
Ron Taylor	MD	Medicine	University of Toronto Faculty of Medicine	Major League Baseball pitcher
Henry Thielman	DDS	Dental surgery	University of Pennsylvania School of Dental Medicine	Major League Baseball pitcher
Debi Thomas	MD	Medicine	Northwestern University Feinberg School of Medicine	Olympic medalist and World Champion figure skater
Jenny Thompson	MD	Medicine	Columbia University College of Physicians and Surgeons	Olympic swimmer
Will Thompson	DDS	Dental surgery	University of Pennsylvania School of Dental Medicine	Major League Baseball pitcher
Shirley Weierman	DDS	Dental surgery	Ohio State University College of Dentistry	Professional baseball player in the All-American Girls Professional Baseball League
Doc White	DDS	Dental surgery	Georgetown University School of Dentistry	Major League Baseball pitcher
Walt Whittaker	DMD	Dental medicine	Tufts University School of Dental Medicine	Major League Baseball pitcher
Haley Wickenheiser	MD	Medicine	University of Calgary Cumming School of Medicine	Canadian Olympic ice hockey gold medal player and team captain, considered among the greatest female ice hockey players of all time, then a physician

== Other professional doctorates ==
In some countries, the Juris Doctor is the standard professional degree required to practice law, although the holder is usually not addressed as "doctor".

Athlete	Degree	Field	Institution	Known for
Terry Baker	JD	Law	USC Gould School of Law	National Football League quarterback and Heisman Trophy winner
Cliff Brantley	JD	Law	Rutgers Law School	Major League Baseball pitcher
Bill Bray	JD	Law	William & Mary Law School	Major League Baseball pitcher
Nick Buoniconti	JD	Law	Suffolk University Law School	National Football League linebacker and Pro Football Hall of Famer
Chris Carr	JD	Law	George Washington University Law School	National Football League cornerback and kick returner
Donn Clendenon	JD	Law	Duquesne University School of Law	Major League Baseball player and 1969 World Series MVP
Cris Collinsworth	JD	Law	University of Cincinnati School of Law	Sportscaster and former National Football League wide receiver
Ben Hayes	JD	Law	University of Florida College of Law	Major League Baseball pitcher
Jarett Dillard	JD	Law	South Texas College of Law	National Football League wide receiver
Len Elmore	JD	Law	Harvard Law School	National Basketball Association player
Katherine Grainger	JD	Law	King's College London	British former rower and current Chair of UK Sport. Summer Olympics gold and silver medallist as well World champion.
Joe Hietpas	JD	Law	Washington University School of Law	Major League Baseball catcher
Billy Hunter	JD	Law	UC Berkeley School of Law	National Football League wide receiver, Executive Director of the National Basketball Players Association
Tony La Russa	JD	Law	Florida State University College of Law	Major League Baseball player and Hall of Fame manager
Ed Lynch	JD	Law	University of Miami School of Law	Major League Baseball pitcher
André Matias	JD	Law	Georgetown University Law Center	Angolan Olympic Rower
Martin Mayhew	JD	Law	Georgetown University Law Center	National Football League player and executive
Jim McFarland	JD	Law	Cornell Law School	National Football League player, member of the Nebraska Legislature
Gerry Meehan	JD	Law	University at Buffalo Law School	National Hockey League player and executive
Kōhei Miyadai	JD	Law	Graduate Schools for Law and Politics and Faculty of Law, University of Tokyo	Nippon Professional Baseball pitcher
Mel Owens	JD	Law	University of California College of the Law, San Francisco	National Football League linebacker
Alan Page	JD	Law	University of Minnesota Law School	National Football League player, member of the College and Pro Football Hall of Fame, Associate Justice of the Minnesota Supreme Court
Bill Perkins	JD	Law	Seton Hall University School of Law	National Football League player
Billy Rohr	JD	Law	Western State College of Law	Major League Baseball pitcher
Rich Ruohonen	JD	Law	Hamline University School of Law	Curler
Matt Simpson	JD	Law	University of Virginia School of Law	Paralympic goalball player
Robert R. Thomas	JD	Law	Loyola University Chicago School of Law	National Football League player, Justice of the Illinois Supreme Court
Byron White	JD	Law	Yale Law School	National Football League player, Justice of the Supreme Court of the United States
Dwayne Woodruff	JD	Law	Duquesne University School of Law	National Football League player, Allegheny County, Pennsylvania judge
Steve Young	JD	Law	J. Reuben Clark Law School	National Football League quarterback, member of the College and Pro Football Halls of Fame

== Incomplete or revoked doctorates ==
Person	Degree	Field	Institution	Known for	Notes
Nadine Apetz	PhD	Neuroscience	University Hospital Cologne	German amateur boxer	Studying as of 2016
Pau Gasol	MD	Medicine	University of Barcelona	Professional basketball player for FC Barcelona of the Liga ACB and the EuroLeague	Dropped out
Hadia Hosny	PhD	Pharmacology	Cairo University	Egyptian Olympic badminton player	Studying as of 2015
Hui Ruoqi	PhD	Physical education	Nanjing Normal University	Chinese volleyball player	Studying as of 2017
Pál Schmitt	PhD	Physical education	Semmelweis University	Hungarian Olympic fencer and politician	Revoked
Louise Shanahan	PhD	Quantum physics	Cambridge University	Irish Olympic athlete	Studying as of 2019
Chris Spence	EdD	Education	University of Toronto	Canadian Football League player	Revoked
Shao Ting	PhD	Education	Beijing Normal University	Chinese basketball player for the Beijing Great Wall and the Chinese national team	Studying as of 2019
Veronica Toro Arana	MD	Medicine	Stanford University School of Medicine	Puerto Rican Olympic rower	Studying as of 2016
Sun Yang	PhD	Kinesiology	Shanghai University of Sport	Chinese Olympic and world-record-holding competitive swimmer.	Studying as of 2018
