= Ladislav Hexner =

Yugoslav table tennis player

Personal information
- Born: 25 September 1915 Sombor, Austria-Hungary
- Died: 1974 (aged 58–59) Lima, Peru

Sport
- Sport: Table tennis
- Club: SSU Sombor (1929–1934); HAŠK Zagreb (1934–1941)
Medal record
Representing Yugoslavia
World Table Tennis Championships
Silver medal – second place	1939 Cairo	Team

Ladislav Hexner (also known as Vladislav Heksner; 1915–1974) was a Yugoslav international table tennis player best known for his achievements in the 1930s.

== Career ==
Hexner was born in 1915 during World War I into a Jewish family living in the city of Sombor, at the time seat of the Bács-Bodrog County in Austria-Hungary. After the war, Sombor and its surrounding region Vojvodina became part of the newly established Kingdom of Yugoslavia.

By the time Hexner was in his early teens, Sombor became one of the country's first centers for the nascent sport of table tennis. In 1928 the local Sombor Sports Society (SSU) established a table tennis section, and that same year the Table Tennis Association of Yugoslavia was also founded in Sombor.

Very early on Hexner rose to prominence as one of the best players in Yugoslavia, and was part of the SSU team which won the first national team championship in 1929–30, as well as the next three national championships, so that by the age of 18 he was already a four-time club team champion of Yugoslavia.

In 1934 Hexner moved to Zagreb to study medicine. Once there, Hexner continued to train at the local Jewish sports society Maccabi Zagreb, as well as the multi-sports club HAŠK affiliated with the University of Zagreb.

Throughout the 1930s Hexner was widely considered one of Yugoslavia's best players, and as an established member of the national team he competed in nine World Table Tennis Championships between 1931 and 1939. His best result with the national team was a silver medal at the 1939 edition in the Swaythling Cup (men's team event), along with teammates Žarko Dolinar, Adolf Heršković, Tibor Harangozo and Max Marinko.

From 1935 to 1941 Hexner also served as a sports official at several clubs in Zagreb, as well as the national Table Tennis Association (STSJ), which had also moved to Zagreb from Sombor around 1930. He is credited with pioneering and promoting the sport in Croatia as he also penned articles for local sports journals, and is thought to be the first player who appeared in a match wearing shorts, at the 1938 World Championships in Wembley.

By the beginning of World War II and the invasion of Yugoslavia in April 1941 the then 25-year-old Hexner had risen to the post of club secretary at HAŠK. By that time, he was a 13-time national champion of Yugoslavia in various events, and is credited with beating several world champions in international tournaments in the 1930s, as well as playing with his HAŠK clubmate and later world champion Dolinar who went on to win gold at the 1954 tournament in men's doubles.

Following the outbreak of the war and the installment of the Nazi-allied NDH regime in Croatia he fled the country and first went to Bolivia, where he lived for a time before permanently settling in Peru. Ladislav Hexner died in Lima in 1974.

== See also ==
- List of table tennis players
- List of World Table Tennis Championships medalists
