= Alfred James Wilmott =

British botanist

Arthur Wilmott
Personal information
- Nationality: England
- Born: 1888 Tottenham, England
- Died: 26 January 1950 (aged 61–62) London, England
Medal record
Representing England
World Table Tennis Championships
Bronze medal – third place	1939	Men's Team

Alfred James Wilmott (1888–1950), or Arthur "Willie" James Wilmott or similar in some sources, was primarily an English botanist and museum curator. His author standard form is Wilmott and his area of interest was spermatophytes. He was also an English international table tennis player.

== Early life ==
His father was an academic who taught at Homerton Training College. Wilmott entered St John's College, Cambridge and graduated from University in 1910. His mentor was Charles Edward Moss.

== Botany ==
Wilmott had an interest in Salicornia. He was the Deputy Keeper of Botany (Natural History) at what was then the British Museum (Natural History). He worked at the museum from 1911 being promoted to Deputy Keeper in 1931 and specialized in the taxonomy of British flora. He wrote articles for the Journal of Botany.

== Sport ==
He won a bronze medal at the 1939 World Table Tennis Championships in the Swaythling Cup (men's team event) with Ken Hyde, Hyman Lurie, Ken Stanley and Ernest Bubley. He received the title for the Veteran Singles Champion in 1934-1935. In table tennis he also introduced a method for testing table tennis balls.

A national league competition 'The Wilmott Cup'was named after him.

== See also ==
- List of England players at the World Team Table Tennis Championships
- List of World Table Tennis Championships medalists
