= Eric Filby =

English table tennis and lawn tennis player

Personal information
- Nationality: England
- Born: 31 May 1917
- Died: 9 December 2004 (aged 87)
Medal record
Representing England
World Table Tennis Championships
Bronze medal – third place	1938	Men's Doubles

Eric John Filby (31 May 1917 – 9 December 2004) was a male English international table tennis and lawn tennis player.

He won a bronze medal at the 1938 World Table Tennis Championships in the men's doubles with Hyman Lurie.

In 1950 he moved from Norfolk to Croydon.

Filby played in the 1955 Wimbledon Championships – Men's Singles.

== See also ==
- List of England players at the World Team Table Tennis Championships
- List of World Table Tennis Championships medalists
