= Rudolf Karleček =

Czech table tennis player

Personal information
- Nationality: Czechoslovakia
- Born: August 29, 1908 Prague
- Died: April 23, 1945 (aged 36) Tuchoměřice, Protectorate of Bohemia and Moravia
Medal record
Representing Czechoslovakia
World Table Tennis Championships
Gold medal – first place	1939	Team

Rudolf Karleček (1908-1945) was a male international table tennis player from Czechoslovakia.

== Table tennis career ==
He won a gold medal in the men's team event at the 1939 World Table Tennis Championships for Czechoslovakia.

== See also ==
- List of table tennis players
- List of World Table Tennis Championships medalists
