= Ken Stanley =

British table tennis player

Personal information
- Nationality: England
- Born: 19 February 1922 Hulme, England
- Died: 1 March 2013 (aged 91) Mirfield, England
Medal record
Representing England
World Table Tennis Championships
Bronze medal – third place	1939	Men's Team

Kenneth Stanley (19 February 1922 – 1 March 2013) was a male English international table tennis player.

== Table tennis career ==
He won a bronze medal at the 1939 World Table Tennis Championships in the Swaythling Cup (men's team event) with Ken Hyde, Hyman Lurie, Ernest Bubley and Arthur Wilmott.

He played table tennis in India and won the All India Cup winning the Men's Singles, Men's Doubles and Mixed Doubles and later coached in Scotland, New Zealand, Norway and England and had an academy in Burnley.

== Personal life ==
He was a football agent and ran a sports agency in London and was also an instructor for the RAF during the war. He married Marion Brook in 1942 and had four children. His son David and daughter Janet played table tennis and won national youth titles. He died in 2013.

== See also ==
- List of England players at the World Team Table Tennis Championships
- List of World Table Tennis Championships medalists
