= Mansour Helmy =

Egyptian table tennis player

Personal information
- Nationality: Egypt
Medal record
Representing Egypt
World Table Tennis Championships
Bronze medal – third place	1939	Mixed Doubles

Mansour Helmy is a male Egyptian former international table tennis player.

He won bronze at the 1939 World Table Tennis Championships in the mixed doubles with Gertrude Pritzi.

== See also ==
- List of table tennis players
- List of World Table Tennis Championships medalists
