= Helmut Goebel =

Austrian table tennis player

Personal information
- Nationality: Austria
- Born: 1919
- Died: 1938 (aged 18–19)
Medal record
Representing Austria
World Table Tennis Championships
Gold medal – first place	1936	Men's team
Silver medal – second place	1937	Men's doubles
Silver medal – second place	1938	Men's team

Helmut Goebel was a male Austrian international table tennis player.

He won a gold medal at the 1936 World Table Tennis Championships in the team event. He then secured a silver medal at the 1937 World Table Tennis Championships in the men's doubles with Richard Bergmann. One year later he won another silver at the 1938 World Table Tennis Championships in the men's team event.

== See also ==
- List of table tennis players
- List of World Table Tennis Championships medalists
