= Lou Pagliaro =

American table tennis player

Personal information
- Nationality: United States
- Born: 5 May 1919
- Died: 8 July 2009 (aged 90)
Medal record
Representing United States
World Table Tennis Championships
| Bronze medal – third place | 1938 | Men's team |
| Silver medal – second place | 1947 | Men's team |
| Bronze medal – third place | 1947 | Men's singles |

Louis Pagliaro (May 5, 1919 – July 8, 2009) was an American table tennis player who won the United States national championship on four occasions, include three consecutive years in the 1940s. His small stature — he was just over 5-foot (1.5 m) tall and weighed less than 120 pounds (54 kg) in his prime — and exciting style of play led to such nicknames as "Bullet Lou", "Dynamite Louie" and "Giant Killer", he was said to have "the hardest forehand in table tennis".

Pagliaro was born on May 5, 1919, in Manhattan to Italian immigrants. Growing up on the Lower East Side, Pagliaro learned to play table tennis as an eight-year old after walking into a Boys' Club of New York location in the area. He showed early proficiency in the sport, quickly defeating the older children who had taught him how to play.

As a 14-year-old, Pagliaro, representing the Tompkins Boys Club, won the Metro Junior Championship held at the Bloomingdale's Midtown Manhattan location in May 1933, by scores of 21–14 and 21–16. Pagliaro was a member of the United States team that competed starting in January 1938 for the Swaythling Cup, the sport's world championships. By April 1938, Pagliaro was ranked third nationally by the United States Table Tennis Association, behind Sol Schiff and George Hendry.

He won his first national title in 1940, defeating defending champion Sol Schiff. In his win in the finals of the 1941 national championships, he was forced back as far as 40 feet (12 m) from the table by finalist Edward Pinner's fast serves and overhead smashes, at one point returning a ball that was 3 inches (7.6 cm) above the floor, arced high in the air, hit the net and landed on the opposite side to win the point, taking the title by scores of 21–18, 21–11 and 22–20 to become the first American to win the title in consecutive years. He won for a third consecutive time in 1942. In front of 1,000 fans at the General Motors Building at the 1942 national championships, held in Detroit, Pagliaro retained his title with a 21–12, 22–20, 21–17 win over Charles Burns, but lost with partner Jim Jacobsen in the men's doubles finals in four games to Ed Pinner and Cy Sussman.

He toured with the USO, entertaining the troops during World War II. He was one of several athletes who turned in their trophies for scrap metal in June 1942 to aid the war effort as part of an effort run by the Bronx Salvage Committee. Unable to make a living in the sport, he left table tennis and was employed at Michelman iron works in Brooklyn, where he remained until he retired in 1984.

Coming out of retirement, Pagliaro won the 1952 national championship tournament held in Cleveland, defeating defending champion Dick Miles, a player whom Pagliaro had previously coached.

He was inducted in 1979 into the USA Table Tennis Hall of Fame.

== Personal ==
Pagliaro always thought of himself as a table tennis player and was described as experiencing "intense pain" when described as a "ping-pong" player, a term that he said was a trademark owned by Parker Brothers that shouldn't be used to describe the game as he played it, though it was widely used by the public. He hated the term "ping-pong", a term that he said "sounds sissy" in a 1942 The New Yorker magazine article. "Ping-pong, ping-pong — my God, what kind of game is that?"

Pagliaro died on July 8, 2009, in Staten Island. He was survived by three daughters, a son, seven grandchildren and six great-grandchildren. He had been married to the former Josephine Modica for 49 years, until her death in 1988.

== See also ==
- List of table tennis players
- List of World Table Tennis Championships medalists
