= Betty Henry =

American table tennis player

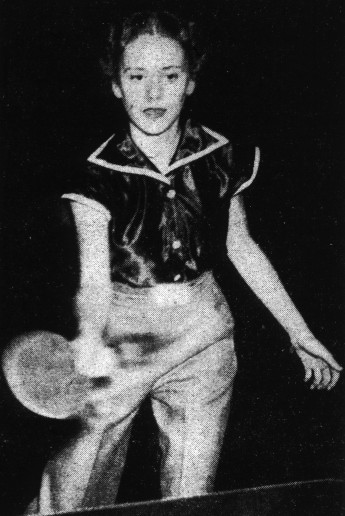
- Link, circa 1939

Personal information
- Nationality: United States
- Born: 11 March 1922 South Bend, Indiana, U.S.
- Died: 10 September 1944 (aged 22) South Bend, Indiana, U.S.

Sport
- Club: South Bend
Medal record
Representing United States
World Table Tennis Championships
Bronze medal – third place	1938	Women's Singles

Betty Link (née Henry, March 11, 1922 – September 10, 1944) was an American female international table tennis player.

Henry was born in South Bend, Indiana on March 11, 1922. She won a bronze at the 1938 World Table Tennis Championships in the women's singles. Henry died in South Bend on September 10, 1944, at the age of 22.

Henry was inducted into the US Table Tennis Hall of Fame in 2025.

== See also ==
- List of table tennis players
- List of World Table Tennis Championships medalists
