= Jindřiška Holubková =

Czech table tennis player

Personal information
- Nationality: Czechoslovakia
Medal record
Representing Czechoslovakia
World Table Tennis Championships
| Gold medal – first place | 1938 | Team |

Jindřiška Holubková is a Czech female former table tennis player who represented Czechoslovakia.

== Table tennis career ==
She won a gold medal in the women's team event at the 1938 World Table Tennis Championships.

== See also ==
- List of table tennis players
- List of World Table Tennis Championships medalists
