= Ernest Bubley =

English table tennis player (1912–1996)

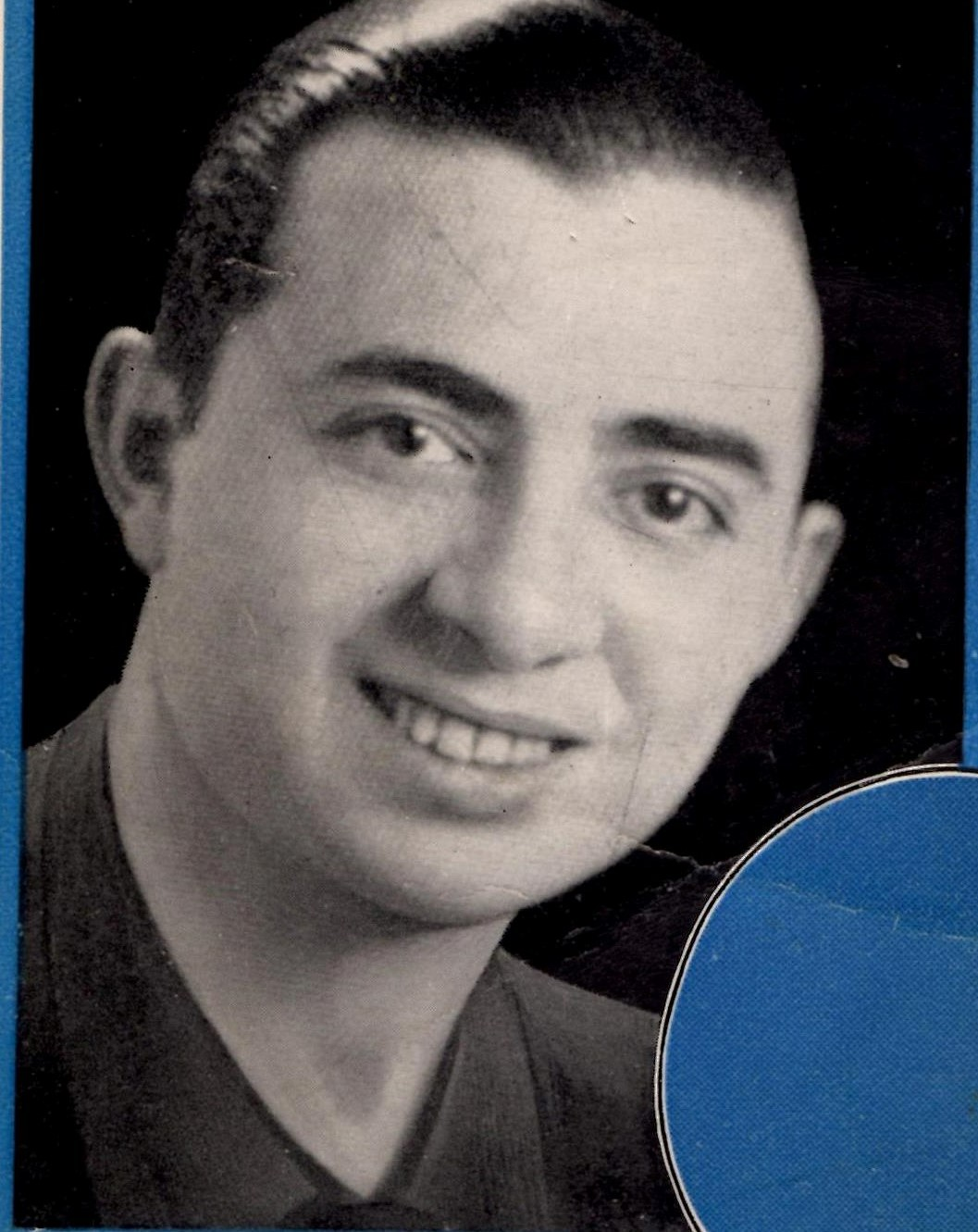

Personal information
- Nationality: England
- Born: September 1912
- Died: 21 January 1996 (aged 83)
Medal record
Representing England
World Table Tennis Championships
Bronze medal – third place	1939	Men's Team

Ernest Bubley (September 1912 – 21 January 1996) was a male English international table tennis player.

== Table tennis career ==
He won a bronze medal at the 1939 World Table Tennis Championships in the Swaythling Cup (men's team event) with Ken Hyde, Hyman Lurie, Ken Stanley and Arthur Wilmott.

== Personal life ==
Ernest Bubley was left-handed. His strength was his backhand and always wore a glove while playing on his left hand to protect his skin, as he often played the violin. He married Jaqueline Alge on 29 January 1948.

== See also ==
- List of England players at the World Team Table Tennis Championships
- List of World Table Tennis Championships medalists
