= Tibor Házi =

Hungarian table tennis player

Tibor Házi (Hoffmann)
- Tibor Házi and Magda Házi playing table tennis with Eddie Pinner and Alice O’Connor, photographed by Gjon Mili for Life magazine, March 3, 1941.

Personal information
- Full name: Tibor Házi (Hoffmann)
- Nationality: Hungary United States
- Born: 9 February 1912
- Died: 18 February 1999 (aged 87)
Medal record
Men's table tennis
Representing Hungary
World Championships
| Bronze medal – third place | 1938 Wembley | Singles |
| Gold medal – first place | 1938 Wembley | Team |
| Bronze medal – third place | 1936 Prague | Doubles |
| Bronze medal – third place | 1936 Prague | Team |
| Gold medal – first place | 1935 Wembley | Team |
| Bronze medal – third place | 1934 Paris | Singles |
| Silver medal – second place | 1934 Paris | Doubles |
| Gold medal – first place | 1934 Paris | Team |
| Bronze medal – third place | 1932 Prague | Doubles |

Tibor Házi born Tibor Hoffmann, (February 9, 1912 – February 18, 1999), was a male international table tennis player from Hungary.

== Sports career ==
He won nine medals in singles, doubles, and team events in the World Table Tennis Championships from the 1932 World Table Tennis Championships to 1938 World Table Tennis Championships.

The nine medals included three team gold medals. After settling in the United States he continued to play for thirty years.

== Personal life ==
He was born as Tibor Hoffmann in 1912 but as Hungarian society became antisemitic he changed his name to Házi.

He married her fellow international player Magda Gál in 1937 and in 1939 they fled to the United States because of their Jewish origins and they settled in Bethesda, Maryland. Gál died in 1990 aged 83 and Házi died in 1999.

== See also ==
- List of table tennis players
- List of World Table Tennis Championships medalists
