= Karl Schediwy =

Austrian table tennis player

Personal information
- Nationality: Austria
- Born: 1916 (age 109–110)
Medal record
Representing Austria
World Table Tennis Championships
Silver medal – second place	1934	Men's Team
Bronze medal – third place	1935	Men's Team
Silver medal – second place	1938	Men's Team

Karl Schediwy was an international table tennis player from Austria.

== Table tennis career ==
From 1933 to 1938 he won three medals in the World Table Tennis Championships.

All three medals came in the Swaythling Cup (men's team event) in 1934 (silver), 1935 (bronze) and 1938 (silver) respectively.

== See also ==
- List of table tennis players
- List of World Table Tennis Championships medalists
