= Josef Tartakower =

Luxembourgish table tennis player

Personal information
- Nationality: Luxembourg
Medal record
Representing Luxembourg
World Table Tennis Championships
Silver medal – second place	1939	Men's Doubles

Josef Tartakower was Luxembourgish international table tennis player.

He won a silver medal at the 1939 World Table Tennis Championships in the men's doubles with Miloslav Hamr.

== See also ==
- List of table tennis players
- List of World Table Tennis Championships medalists
