= Doris Jordan (table tennis) =

British table tennis player

Personal information
- Nationality: England
- Born: 14 June 1911 London
- Died: 1 October 1986 (aged 75) Birmingham
Medal record
Representing England
World Table Tennis Championships
| Silver medal – second place | 1938 | Women's Team |
| Bronze medal – third place | 1938 | Women's Doubles |

Doris Jordan (married name Doris Haydon) was a female English international table tennis player.

She won a silver medal in the women's team event and a bronze medal in the women's doubles with Phyllis Hodgkinson at the 1938 World Table Tennis Championships.

== Personal life ==
She married international player Arthur Adrian Haydon in 1938 and they had a child called Adrianne Haydon in October 1938; Adrianne is better known as Ann Jones.

== See also ==
- List of table tennis players
- List of World Table Tennis Championships medalists
