= Ida Ferenczy (table tennis) =

Hungarian table tennis player

Personal information
- Nationality: Hungary
Medal record
Representing Hungary
World Table Tennis Championships
Silver medal – second place	1938	Women's doubles

Ida Ferenczy was a female international table tennis player from Hungary.

She won a silver medal at the 1938 World Table Tennis Championships in the women's doubles with Dora Beregi.

== See also ==
- List of table tennis players
- List of World Table Tennis Championships medalists
