= Ernő Földi =

Hungarian table tennis player

Personal information
- Nationality: Hungary
- Born: 1911
- Died: 1944 (aged 32–33)
Medal record
Representing Hungary
World Table Tennis Championships
Gold medal – first place	1938	Team

Ernő Földi (1911–1944) is a male former international table tennis player from Hungary.

== Table tennis career ==
He won a gold medal in the men's team event at the 1938 World Table Tennis Championships.

== See also ==
- List of table tennis players
- List of World Table Tennis Championships medalists
