= Samiha Naili =

Egyptian table tennis player

Personal information
- Nationality: Egyptian
Medal record
Representing Egypt
World Table Tennis Championships
Bronze medal – third place	1939	Women's Singles
Bronze medal – third place	1939	Women's Doubles

Samiha Naili was a female Egyptian international table tennis player.

She won double bronze at the 1939 World Table Tennis Championships in the women's singles and women's doubles.

== See also ==
- List of table tennis players
- List of World Table Tennis Championships medalists
