= Phyllis Hodgkinson =

British table tennis player

Personal information
- Nationality: England
Medal record
Representing England
World Table Tennis Championships
Bronze medal – third place	1938	Women's Team
Bronze medal – third place	1938	Women's Singles

Phyllis Hodgkinson was a female English international table tennis player.

She won a silver medal in the women's team event and a bronze medal in the women's doubles with Doris Jordan at the 1938 World Table Tennis Championships.

She was an all-round sportswoman playing lawn tennis for Kingsway and Lensbury, badminton, cricket for Gunnersbury Ladies and field hockey for Chiswick.

She married Keith Lauder in 1947 and became Phyllis Lauder.

== See also ==
- List of England players at the World Team Table Tennis Championships
- List of World Table Tennis Championships medalists
