= Dora Beregi =

British table tennis player (1915–2011)

Personal information
- Full name: Dóra Beregi
- Nationality: Hungary; England; Australia
- Born: 8 August 1915 Budapest, Austria-Hungary
- Died: 8 February 2011 (aged 95) Sydney, Australia
Medal record
Women's table tennis
Representing Hungary
World Championships
| Silver medal – second place | 1938 Wembley | Doubles |
Representing England
World Championships
| Silver medal – second place | 1948 Wembley | Doubles |
| Gold medal – first place | 1948 Wembley | Team |
| Bronze medal – third place | 1948 Wembley | Mixed Doubles |
| Gold medal – first place | 1950 Budapest | Doubles |
| Bronze medal – third place | 1950 Budapest | Team |

Dora Beregi (8 August 1915 – 8 February 2011) was an international table tennis player from Hungary and later England and Australia.

== Table tennis career ==
Beregi won a silver medal at the 1938 World Table Tennis Championships with Ida Ferenczy in the doubles when representing Hungary.

Being of Jewish descent she moved to England from Europe before the war and then represented England.

Beregi was a member of the winning England team at the 1948 World Table Tennis Championships and in addition won two more medals in the doubles with Helen Elliot and Richard Bergmann respectively.

Two more medals were won in the 1950 World Table Tennis Championships; a gold in the doubles with Helen Elliot and a bronze in the team event. She was also the winner of six English Open tournaments.

Beregi also participated in the Australian championships in Brisbane in 1950. later she emigrated to Australia.

== Personal life ==
Beregi married Irishman Henry(Harry)Devenny in Exeter, England and became Dora Devenny. She had one child a son John born in 1948 in Exeter. The family migrated to Australia in 1950 where they settled in Sydney.

Beregi died in Sydney on 8 February 2011 at the age of 95.

== See also ==
- List of England players at the World Team Table Tennis Championships
- List of table tennis players
- List of World Table Tennis Championships medalists
