= James McClure (table tennis) =

American table tennis player

Personal information
- Full name: James 'Jimmy' McClure
- Nationality: United States
- Born: 28 September 1916 Indianapolis, Indiana, United States
- Died: 12 February 2005 (aged 88) Cape Coral, Florida, United States

Sport
- Sport: Table tennis
Medal record
Men's table tennis
Representing United States
World Championships
Bronze medal – third place	1949 Stockholm	Team
Gold medal – first place	1938 Wembley	Doubles
Bronze medal – third place	1938 Wembley	Team
Gold medal – first place	1937 Baden	Doubles
Gold medal – first place	1937 Baden	Team
Gold medal – first place	1936 Prague	Doubles

James McClure (September 28, 1916; Indianapolis, Indiana – February 12, 2005; Cape Coral, Florida) was an American international table tennis player.

== Table tennis career ==
From 1936 to 1949 he won six medals in doubles, and team events in the World Table Tennis Championships. This included four gold medals; three in the doubles with Buddy Blattner and Sol Schiff respectively and one in the team event.

== See also ==
- List of table tennis players
- List of World Table Tennis Championships medalists
