= Hilde Bussmann =

German table tennis player

Personal information
- Full name: Bussmann Hilde
- Nationality: Germany
- Born: 24 November 1914
- Died: 10 January 1988 (aged 73)

Sport
- Sport: Table tennis
Medal record
Women's table tennis
World Championships
Gold medal – first place	1939 Cairo	Doubles
Bronze medal – third place	1939 Cairo	Mixed
Gold medal – first place	1939 Cairo	Team
Silver medal – second place	1937 Baden	Doubles
Bronze medal – third place	1937 Baden	Singles
Silver medal – second place	1936 Prague	Team
Bronze medal – third place	1935 Wembley	Doubles
Bronze medal – third place	1935 Wembley	Team
Bronze medal – third place	1934 Paris	Doubles

Hildegard Bussmann (24 November 1914 – 10 January 1988) was an international table tennis player from Germany. She was born in Düsseldorf.

== Table tennis career ==
From 1934 to 1939 she won eight medals in singles, doubles and team events in the World Table Tennis Championships.

The eight World Championship medals included two gold medals in the doubles with Gertrude Pritzi at the 1939 World Table Tennis Championships and the team event at the 1939 World Table Tennis Championships.

== See also ==
- List of table tennis players
- List of World Table Tennis Championships medalists
