= Ken Hyde =

English table tennis player

Personal information
- Nationality: England
- Born: June 1915 St Helens, England
- Died: June 2010 (aged 94–95)
Medal record
Representing England
World Table Tennis Championships
Bronze medal – third place	1939	Men's Team
Bronze medal – third place	1939	Men's Doubles

James Kenneth Hyde (June 1915 – June 2010) was a male English international table tennis player.

== Table tennis career ==
He won two bronze medals at the 1939 World Table Tennis Championships in the men's doubles with Hyman Lurie and in the Swaythling Cup (men's team event) with Ernest Bubley, Hyman Lurie, Ken Stanley and Arthur Wilmott.

He represented England 16 times between 1933 and 1939. He played for the Liverpool club, was ranked English number one in 1937 and was the only Englishman to beat Viktor Barna.

He reached the final of the English Open doubles in 1934 when partnering with Andrew Millar.

== Personal life ==
He studied at the University of Liverpool and earned a BSc in chemistry. His brothers Gilbert Cecil Hyde and Eric Hyde both played county table tennis. He married in 1940 and was in the Royal Air Force. He died in 2010.

== See also ==
- List of England players at the World Team Table Tennis Championships
- List of World Table Tennis Championships medalists
