= Žarko Dolinar =

Croatian table tennis player

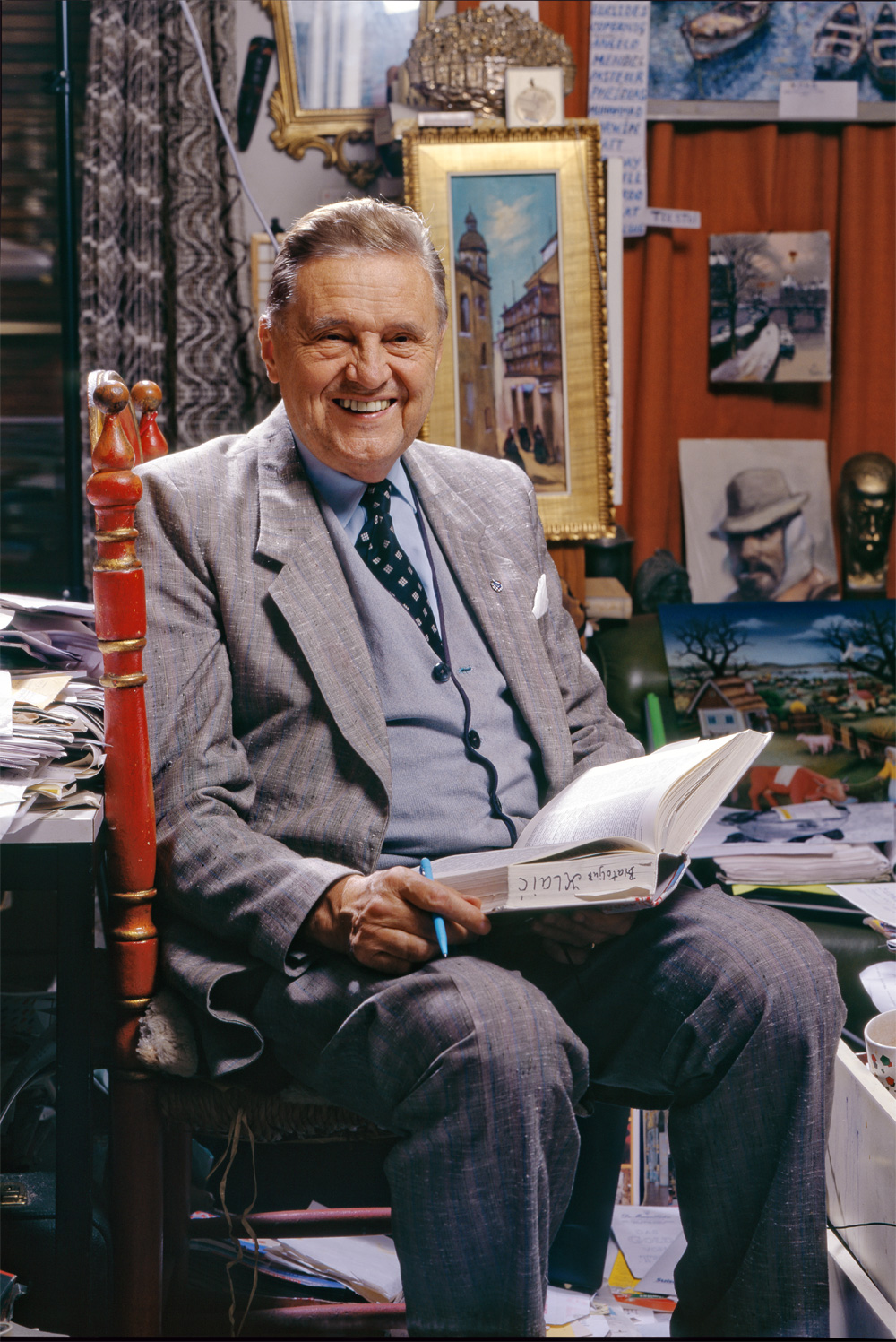
- Žarko Dolinar (2002)

Personal information
- Nationality: Yugoslavia
- Born: 3 July 1920 Koprivnica, Yugoslavia
- Died: 9 March 2003 (aged 82) Basel, Switzerland

Sport
- Sport: Table tennis
Medal record
Table tennis
Representing Yugoslavia
World Championships
| Silver medal – second place | 1939 Cairo | Team |
| Bronze medal – third place | 1939 Cairo | Singles |
| Bronze medal – third place | 1951 Vienna | Team |
| Silver medal – second place | 1953 Bucharest | Mixed doubles |
| Gold medal – first place | 1954 Wembley | Doubles |
| Bronze medal – third place | 1954 Wembley | Mixed doubles |
| Silver medal – second place | 1955 Utrecht | Singles |
| Silver medal – second place | 1955 Utrecht | Doubles |

Žarko Dolinar (3 July 1920 – 9 March 2003) was a Croatian biologist and table tennis player who won eight medals at the World Table Tennis Championships.

He was born in a family of Slovene economic migrants to Croatia. In 1939, at the age of 18 he became the national champion of Yugoslavia. Dolinar was champion of the Independent State of Croatia multiple times, and also competed for its national team on nine occasions.

He also won three English Open titles.

Dolinar is one of few world sporting champions with a Ph.D. degree. He graduated from the University of Zagreb Faculty of Veterinary Medicine in 1949, and received a doctorate in 1959. He was world doubles champion with his partner, Vilim Harangozo. Dolinar was also head of the Sports Science Committee for the International Table Tennis Federation (ITTF).

A university professor in both Zagreb and Basel, Dolinar and his brother Boris were honored as the Righteous Among the Nations for saving Jews during World War II. On a number of occasions, the Dolinar brothers provided Jews with forged identity documents and travel permits, used their connections to have them released from imprisonment, and helped them travel to safety.

In 2016, Dolinar was inducted into the European Table Tennis Hall of Fame.

== See also ==
- List of table tennis players
- List of World Table Tennis Championships medalists

Awards
| Preceded by Perica Vlašić | Yugoslav Sportsman of the Year; 1954 | Succeeded by Bernard Vukas |
