= Max Marinko =

Yugoslav-Czech table tennis player (1916–1975)

Personal information
- Nationality: Yugoslavia; Czechoslovakia; Canada
- Born: Maks Marinko; 16 September 1916 Ljubljana, Duchy of Carniola, Austria-Hungary
- Died: 20 August 1975 (aged 58) Toronto, Canada

Sport
- Sport: Table tennis
- Club: Hermes Ljubljana; HAŠK Zagreb; ŠK Bratislava (1942–1952)
Medal record
Representing Yugoslavia
World Table Tennis Championships
Silver medal – second place	1939 Cairo	Team
Representing Czechoslovakia
World Table Tennis Championships
Gold medal – first place	1948 Wembley	Team
Silver medal – second place	1949 Stockholm	Team
Gold medal – first place	1950 Budapest	Team

Max Marinko (also known as Maks; 16 September 1916 – 20 August 1975) was a Yugoslav-Czechoslovak international table tennis player.

== Table tennis career ==
Marinko won a silver medal at the 1939 World Table Tennis Championships in the men's team event for Yugoslavia. After World War II, he switched allegiance to Czechoslovakia and went on to win three more medals, two of which were gold, in the team event.

== See also ==
- List of table tennis players
- List of World Table Tennis Championships medalists
