= Hyman Lurie =

British table tennis player

Personal information
- Nationality: England
- Born: 28 May 1918
- Died: June 1982 (aged 64)
Medal record
Representing England
World Table Tennis Championships
Bronze medal – third place	1938	Men's Doubles
Bronze medal – third place	1939	Men's Doubles
Bronze medal – third place	1939	Men's Team

Hyman Lurie (28 May 1918 – June 1982) was a male English international table tennis player.

== Table tennis career ==
He won a bronze medal at the 1938 World Table Tennis Championships in the men's doubles with Eric Filby. One year later he won double bronze at the 1939 World Table Tennis Championships by partnering Ken Hyde in a men's doubles and being part of the men's team, in the Swaythling Cup with Ken Hyde, Ernest Bubley, Ken Stanley and Arthur Wilmott.

== Personal life ==
Hyman ran his father's Barber Shop on Elizabeth Street in Manchester. The shop was opened by Israel Lurie and it was the first to serve ladies in Manchester. He was Jewish.

== See also ==
- List of England players at the World Team Table Tennis Championships
- List of World Table Tennis Championships medalists
