= Sol Schiff =

American table tennis player (1917–2012)

Personal information
- Full name: Solomon Joseph Schiff
- Nationality: United States
- Born: 28 June 1917 Manhattan, New York, U.S.
- Died: 26 February 2012 (aged 94) Brooklyn, New York, U.S.

Sport
- Sport: Table tennis
Medal record
Men's table tennis
Representing United States
World Championships
Silver medal – second place	1947 Paris	Team
Gold medal – first place	1938 Wembley	Doubles
Bronze medal – third place	1938 Wembley	Team
Gold medal – first place	1937 Wembley	Team

Solomon Joseph Schiff (June 28, 1917 – February 26, 2012) was an American table tennis player from New York.

He attended Textile High School in New York City.

== Table tennis career ==
Schiff was a six-time U.S. Open Men's Doubles champion, and nine-time U.S. Mixed Doubles champion. In 1936, he won the U.S. Men's Singles title.

From 1937 to 1947, he won four medals in doubles and team events in the World Table Tennis Championships. The four World Championship medals included two gold medals; one in the doubles with Jimmy McClure at the 1938 World Table Tennis Championships and one in the team event at the 1937 World Table Tennis Championships.

He also won an English Open title.

He was inducted into the USA Table Tennis Hall of Fame. He was also inducted into the International Jewish Sports Hall of Fame.

From 1976 to 1984, and again from 1986 to 1988, Schiff was president of the United States Table Tennis Association (now called USA Table Tennis)

== See also ==
- List of table tennis players
- List of World Table Tennis Championships medalists
