= Věra Votrubcová =

Czechoslovak table tennis player

Personal information
- Full name: VOTRUBCOVÁ Věra
- Nationality: Czechoslovakia
- Born: 28 February 1911
- Died: 24 July 1981 (aged 70)
Medal record
Women's table tennis
Representing Czechoslovakia
World Championships
Bronze medal – third place	1947 Paris	Team
Bronze medal – third place	1939 Cairo	Doubles
Gold medal – first place	1939 Cairo	Mixed Doubles
Silver medal – second place	1939 Cairo	Team
Bronze medal – third place	1938 Wembley	Singles
Gold medal – first place	1938 Wembley	Doubles
Silver medal – second place	1938 Wembley	Mixed Doubles
Gold medal – first place	1938 Wembley	Team
Gold medal – first place	1937 Baden	Doubles
Gold medal – first place	1937 Baden	Mixed Doubles
Bronze medal – third place	1937 Baden	Team
Silver medal – second place	1936 Prague	Doubles
Gold medal – first place	1936 Prague	Team

Věra Votrubcová is a former female international table tennis player from Czechoslovakia.

== Table tennis career ==
From 1936 to 1947 she won thirteen medals in singles, doubles, and team events in the World Table Tennis Championships. She also won three English Open titles.

The 13 World Championship medals included six gold medals; two in the team event, two in the mixed doubles with Bohumil Váňa and two in the women's doubles with Vlasta Depetrisová.

== Hall of Fame ==
She was inducted into the Hall of Fame of the International Table Tennis Federation in 1993.

== See also ==
- List of table tennis players
- List of World Table Tennis Championships medalists
