= Vlasta Depetrisová =

Czechoslovak table tennis player

Personal information
- Full name: Vlasta Vlková-Depetrisová
- Nationality: Czechoslovakia
- Born: 20 December 1920 Plzeň, Czechoslovakia
- Died: 23 October 2003 (aged 82) Plzeň, Czech Republic

Sport
- Sport: Table tennis
Medal record
Women's table tennis
Representing Czechoslovakia
World Championships
Gold medal – first place	1937 Baden	Doubles
Gold medal – first place	1938 Wembley	Doubles
Gold medal – first place	1938 Wembley	Team
Gold medal – first place	1939 Cairo	Singles
Silver medal – second place	1936 Prague	Doubles
Silver medal – second place	1938 Wembley	Singles
Silver medal – second place	1939 Cairo	Team
Silver medal – second place	1947 Paris	Mixed Doubles
Silver medal – second place	1948 Wembley	Mixed Doubles
Bronze medal – third place	1937 Baden	Team
Bronze medal – third place	1939 Cairo	Doubles
Bronze medal – third place	1947 Paris	Team
Bronze medal – third place	1948 Wembley	Singles
Bronze medal – third place	1948 Wembley	Team

Vlasta Depetrisová (20 December 1920 – 23 October 2003) was a Czech female international table tennis player.

== Table tennis career ==
From 1936 to 1948 she won fourteen medals in singles, doubles, and team events in the World Table Tennis Championships.

Her married name was Vlasta Pokorná.

The fourteen World Championship medals included four gold medals; one in the singles at the 1949 World Table Tennis Championships, one in the women's team event and two in the doubles with Věra Votrubcová.

She also won an English Open title.

== See also ==
- List of table tennis players
- List of World Table Tennis Championships medalists
