= Bohumil Váňa =

Czech table tennis player

Personal information
- Full name: Bohumil Váňa
- Nationality: Czechoslovakia
- Born: 17 January 1920 Prague
- Died: 4 November 1989 (aged 69)
Medal record
Men's table tennis
Representing Czechoslovakia
World Championships
Silver medal – second place	1955 Utrecht	Team
Bronze medal – third place	1953 Bucharest	Doubles
Bronze medal – third place	1953 Bucharest	Team
Gold medal – first place	1951 Vienna	Doubles
Gold medal – first place	1951 Vienna	Mixed Doubles
Gold medal – first place	1951 Vienna	Team
Bronze medal – third place	1950 Budapest	Doubles
Silver medal – second place	1950 Budapest	Mixed Doubles
Gold medal – first place	1950 Budapest	Team
Silver medal – second place	1949 Stockholm	Singles
Silver medal – second place	1949 Stockholm	Doubles
Silver medal – second place	1949 Stockholm	Mixed Doubles
Silver medal – second place	1949 Stockholm	Team
Silver medal – second place	1948 Wembley	Singles
Gold medal – first place	1948 Wembley	Doubles
Silver medal – second place	1948 Wembley	Mixed Doubles
Gold medal – first place	1948 Wembley	Team
Gold medal – first place	1947 Paris	Singles
Gold medal – first place	1947 Paris	Doubles
Gold medal – first place	1947 Paris	Team
Bronze medal – third place	1939 Cairo	Singles
Gold medal – first place	1939 Cairo	Mixed Doubles
Gold medal – first place	1939 Cairo	Team
Gold medal – first place	1938 Wembley	Singles
Silver medal – second place	1938 Wembley	Mixed Doubles
Bronze medal – third place	1938 Wembley	Team
Gold medal – first place	1937 Baden	Mixed Doubles
Bronze medal – third place	1937 Baden	Team
Bronze medal – third place	1936 Prague	Team
Silver medal – second place	1935 Wembley	Team

Bohumil Váňa (17 January 1920 – 4 November 1989) was a Czech international table tennis player who represented Czechoslovakia. He was born and died in Prague.

== Table tennis career ==
From 1935 to 1955 he won 30 medals in singles, doubles, and team events in the World Table Tennis Championships. This included 13 gold medals. He also won five English Open titles.

== See also ==
- List of table tennis players
- List of World Table Tennis Championships medalists
