= Gertrude Pritzi =

Austrian table tennis player

Personal information
- Native name: Pritzi Gertrude
- Full name: Gertrude Pritzi
- Nationality: Austria
- Born: 15 January 1920 Vienna, Austria
- Died: 21 October 1968 (aged 48) Vienna, Austria

Sport
- Sport: Table tennis
- Playing style: Shakehand grip
Medal record
Women's table tennis
Representing Austria
World Championships
Bronze medal – third place	1953 Bucharest	Women's Team
Bronze medal – third place	1951 Vienna	Singles
Silver medal – second place	1951 Vienna	Women's Team
Bronze medal – third place	1949 Stockholm	Singles
Bronze medal – third place	1947 Paris	Singles
Gold medal – first place	1947 Paris	Doubles
Gold medal – first place	1938 Wembley	Singles
Bronze medal – third place	1938 Wembley	Mixed Doubles
Bronze medal – third place	1938 Wembley	Women's Team
Gold medal – first place	1937 Baden	Singles
Representing Nazi Germany
World Championships
Silver medal – second place	1939 Cairo	Singles
Gold medal – first place	1939 Cairo	Doubles
Bronze medal – third place	1939 Cairo	Mixed Doubles
Gold medal – first place	1939 Cairo	Women's Team

Gertrude Pritzi (15 January 1920 – 21 October 1968) was a female international table tennis player from Austria.

== Table tennis career ==
From 1937 to 1953, she won fourteen medals in singles, doubles and team events in the World Table Tennis Championships. She also won doubles and team medals in the European Table Tennis Championships.

The champion of Women's Singles in 1937 was declared vacant due to time limit rule in force at the time. In 2001, it was decided to declare the two players (i.e., Gertrude Pritzi and Ruth Aarons) Co-Champions.

She began her table tennis career with the association Badner AC, changed 1936 finally to post office sports association Vienna and 1945 to Austria Vienna. In 1937 and 1938 she won and became generally accepted the Austrian championship thereby against the Trude Wildam prevailing at that time.

After the annexation of Austria by Germany, she participated in the World Championships of 1939 for Nazi Germany.

The fourteen World Championship medals included five gold medals; two in the women's singles, one in the women's team event and two in the doubles with Hilde Bussmann and Gizi Farkas.

== See also ==
- List of table tennis players
- List of World Table Tennis Championships medalists
