= 1925 in tennis =

This page covers all the important events in the sport of tennis in 1925. It provides the results of notable tournaments throughout the year on both the men's and women's ILTF tennis circuits.

== Australian Open ==
Category	Champion(s)	Finalist(s)	Score
Men's singles	(Australia) James Anderson	(Australia) Gerald Patterson	11–9, 2–6, 6–2, 6–3
Women's singles	(Australia) Daphne Akhurst	(Australia) Esna Boyd	1–6, 8–6, 6–4
Men's doubles	(Australia) Pat O'Hara Wood (Australia) Gerald Patterson	(Australia) James Anderson (Australia) Fred Kalms	6–4, 9–7, 7–5
Women's doubles	(Australia) Daphne Akhurst (Australia) Sylvia Harper	(Australia) Esna Boyd (Australia) Kathleen Le Messurier	6–4, 6–3
Mixed doubles	(Australia) Daphne Akhurst (Australia) Jim Willard	(Australia) Sylvia Harper (Australia) Bob Schlesinger	6–4, 6–4

== French Open ==
Category	Champion(s)	Finalist(s)	Score
Men's singles	(France) René Lacoste	(France) Jean Borotra	7–5, 6–1, 6–4
Women's singles	(France) Suzanne Lenglen	(United Kingdom) Kitty McKane	6–1, 6–2
Men's doubles	(France) Jean Borotra (France) René Lacoste	(France) Henri Cochet (France) Jacques Brugnon	7–5, 4–6, 6–3, 2–6, 6–3
Women's doubles	(France) Suzanne Lenglen (France) Julie Vlasto	(United Kingdom) Evelyn Colyer (United Kingdom) Kitty McKane	6–1, 9–11, 6–2
Mixed doubles	(France) Suzanne Lenglen (France) Jacques Brugnon	(France) Julie Vlasto (France) Henri Cochet	6–2, 6–2

== Wimbledon ==
Category	Champion(s)	Finalist(s)	Score
Men's singles	(France) René Lacoste	(France) Jean Borotra	6–3, 6–3, 4–6, 8–6
Women's singles	(France) Suzanne Lenglen	(United Kingdom) Joan Fry	6–2, 6–0
Men's doubles	(France) Jean Borotra (France) René Lacoste	(United States) Raymond Casey (United States) John Hennessey	6–4, 11–9, 4–6, 1–6, 6–3
Women's doubles	(France) Suzanne Lenglen (United States) Elizabeth Ryan	(United Kingdom) Kathleen Bridge (United Kingdom) Mary McIlquham	6–2, 6–2
Mixed doubles	(France) Jean Borotra (France) Suzanne Lenglen	(Italy) Uberto de Morpurgo (United States) Elizabeth Ryan	6–3, 6–3

== US Open ==
Category	Champion(s)	Finalist(s)	Score
Men's singles	(United States) Bill Tilden	(United States) Bill Johnston	4–6, 11–9, 6–3, 4–6, 6–3
Women's singles	(United States) Helen Wills	(United Kingdom) Kitty McKane	3–6, 6–0, 6–2
Men's doubles	(United States) Richard Norris Williams (United States) Vincent Richards	(Australia) Gerald Patterson (Australia) Jack Hawkes	6–2, 8–10, 6–4, 11–9
Women's doubles	(United States) Mary Browne (United States) Helen Wills	(United States) May Sutton Bundy (United States) Elizabeth Ryan	6–4, 6–3
Mixed doubles	(United Kingdom) Kitty McKane (Australia) Jack Hawkes	(United Kingdom) Ermyntrude Harvey (United States) Vincent Richards	6–2, 6–4
