= 1925 Australasian Championships – Men's doubles =

Men's doubles
- 1925 Australasian Championships

Final
- Champions: (Australia) Pat O'Hara Wood (Australia) Gerald Patterson
- Runners-up: (Australia) James Anderson (Australia) Fred Kalms
- Score: 6–4, 9–7, 7–5

Details
- Draw: 32
- Seeds: 8

Events
Singles	men	women		boys	girls
Doubles	men	women	mixed	boys	girls
← 1924 ·	Australasian Championships	· 1926 →

The first seeds Pat O'Hara Wood and Gerald Patterson defeated second-seeded James Anderson and Fred Kalms 6–4, 9–7, 7–5 in the final, to win the men's doubles tennis title at the 1925 Australasian Championships.

== Seeds ==
1. (Australia) Pat O'Hara Wood / (Australia) Gerald Patterson (champions)
2. (Australia) James Anderson / (Australia) Fred Kalms (final)
3. (Australia) Gar Hone / (Australia) Rupert Wertheim (semifinals)
4. (Australia) Les Baker / (Australia) Norman Peach (semifinals)
5. (Australia) Jack Cummings / (Australia) Bob Spencer (quarterfinals)
6. (Australia) Aubrey Willard / (Australia) Jim Willard (quarterfinals)
7. (Australia) Keith Poulton / (Australia) Bob Schlesinger (quarterfinals)
8. (Australia) Bruce Dive / (Australia) Allan Hall (second round)

== Draw ==
=== Key ===
- Q = Qualifier
- WC = Wild card
- LL = Lucky loser
- Alt = Alternate
- ITF = ITF entry
- PR = Protected ranking
- SR = Special ranking
- SE = Special exempt
- JE = Junior exempt
- JR = Junior Accelerator Programme entrant
- CO = College Accelerator Programme entrant
- NG = Next Gen Accelerator Program entrant
- w/o = Walkover
- r = Retired
- d = Defaulted

=== Finals ===
Quarterfinals
1	(Australia) Pat O'Hara Wood (Australia) Gerald Patterson	6	8	6
6	(Australia) Aubrey Willard (Australia) Jim Willard	3	6	2
7	(Australia) Keith Poulton (Australia) Bob Schlesinger	3	3	6	4
4	(Australia) Les Baker (Australia) Norman Peach	6	6	3	6
3	(Australia) Gar Hone (Australia) Rupert Wertheim	6	10	6
(Australia) A. Carmichael (Australia) Jack Crawford	4	8	1
5	(Australia) Jack Cummings (Australia) Bob Spencer	3	4	4
2	(Australia) James Anderson (Australia) Fred Kalms	6	6	6

Semifinals
1	(Australia) Pat O'Hara Wood (Australia) Gerald Patterson	6	6	6
4	(Australia) Les Baker (Australia) Norman Peach	3	1	2
3	(Australia) Gar Hone (Australia) Rupert Wertheim	3	4	4
2	(Australia) James Anderson (Australia) Fred Kalms	6	6	6

Final
1	(Australia) Pat O'Hara Wood (Australia) Gerald Patterson	6	9	7
2	(Australia) James Anderson (Australia) Fred Kalms	4	7	5

=== Earlier rounds ===
==== Section 1 ====
First round

Second round
1	(Australia) Pat O'Hara Wood (Australia) Gerald Patterson	6	6	6
(Australia) W. J. Baldock (Australia) L. Gibson	2	2	2
(Australia) Jack McCausland (Australia) Norman McDougall	6	6	6
(Australia) Alec Berckelman ^{[a]} (Australia) Ray Dunlop	4	1	4
(Australia) Robert Berriman (Australia) Morris Smith	7	3	5	6	7
(Australia) Basil Fitchett (Australia) Paul Haege	5	6	7	4	5
6	(Australia) Aubrey Willard (Australia) Jim Willard	9	6	6
(Australia) Frank Peach (Australia) G. R. "Joe" Reid	7	0	3

Third round
1	(Australia) Pat O'Hara Wood (Australia) Gerald Patterson	7	6	6
(Australia) Jack McCausland (Australia) Norman McDougall	5	3	3
(Australia) Robert Berriman (Australia) Morris Smith	4	4	3
6	(Australia) Aubrey Willard (Australia) Jim Willard	6	6	6

Quarterfinals
1	(Australia) Pat O'Hara Wood (Australia) Gerald Patterson	6	8	6
6	(Australia) Aubrey Willard (Australia) Jim Willard	3	6	2

==== Section 2 ====
First round

Second round
7	(Australia) Keith Poulton (Australia) Bob Schlesinger	6	2	6	2	6
(Australia) Rice Gemmell (Australia) Victor Trounce	2	6	3	6	1
(Australia) Horrie Rice (Australia) E. King Roberts	6	6	6
(Australia) Roy Bulcock (Australia) Julie Moxon	2	1	0
(Australia) Stewart Henderson (Australia) H. W. Kirkpatrick	6	6	6
(Australia) Syd Harpur (Australia) Robert Kidston	2	2	0
4	(Australia) Les Baker (Australia) Norman Peach	6	6	6
(Australia) Alfred Chave (Australia) Max Cryle	0	3	3

Third round
7	(Australia) Keith Poulton (Australia) Bob Schlesinger	6	6	6
(Australia) Horrie Rice (Australia) E. King Roberts	4	4	4
(Australia) Stewart Henderson (Australia) H. W. Kirkpatrick	1	2	8
4	(Australia) Les Baker (Australia) Norman Peach	6	6	10

Quarterfinals
7	(Australia) Keith Poulton (Australia) Bob Schlesinger	3	3	6	4
4	(Australia) Les Baker (Australia) Norman Peach	6	6	3	6

==== Section 3 ====
First round

Second round
3	(Australia) Gar Hone (Australia) Rupert Wertheim	6	6	6
(Australia) Jack Garvin (Australia) Guy Williams	1	0	1
(Australia) Gar Moon (Australia) Lionel Oxenham	6	6	4	6
(Australia) Edward Jordan (Australia) Jack Spark	3	3	6	1
(Australia) A. Carmichael (Australia) Jack Crawford	w/o
(Australia) Dick Medcalf (Australia) Jim O'Ryan
8	(Australia) Bruce Dive (Australia) Allan Hall	6	6	8
(Australia) Alan Coldham (Australia) Jack Turner	4	4	6

Third round
3	(Australia) Gar Hone (Australia) Rupert Wertheim	6	6	8
(Australia) Gar Moon (Australia) Lionel Oxenham	3	4	6
(Australia) A. Carmichael (Australia) Jack Crawford	w/o
8	(Australia) Bruce Dive (Australia) Allan Hall

Quarterfinals
3	(Australia) Gar Hone (Australia) Rupert Wertheim	6	10	6
(Australia) A. Carmichael (Australia) Jack Crawford	4	8	1

==== Section 4 ====
First round
(Australia) E. M. Ladyman (Australia) Cecil Lamb	6	2	6	10
(Australia) Clinton Moon ^{[b]} (Australia) Jack Moran	3	6	1	8

Second round
5	(Australia) Jack Cummings (Australia) Bob Spencer	6	6	6
(Australia) W. R. James (Australia) Alan Treloar	1	2	3
(Australia) Ellis Munro (Australia) Possum Munro	7	6	6
(Australia) Frank Blaxland (Australia) M. Henry Marsh	5	0	2
(Australia) E. M. Ladyman (Australia) Cecil Lamb	0	1	5
2	(Australia) James Anderson (Australia) Fred Kalms	6	6	7

Third round
5	(Australia) Jack Cummings (Australia) Bob Spencer	3	6	7	6
(Australia) Dudley Bullough (Australia) Maurice Plomley	6	1	5	2
(Australia) Ellis Munro (Australia) Possum Munro	3	1	2
2	(Australia) James Anderson (Australia) Fred Kalms	6	6	6

Quarterfinals
5	(Australia) Jack Cummings (Australia) Bob Spencer	3	4	4
2	(Australia) James Anderson (Australia) Fred Kalms	6	6	6

== Notes ==
- ^{a} Often spelled Berckleman.
- ^{b} C. B. Moon, elder brother of Gar. Often misspelled as T. B. Moon.

Preceded by 1924 U.S. National Championships – Men's doubles	Grand Slam men's doubles	Succeeded by 1925 French Championships – Men's doubles
