= 1924 in tennis =

This page covers all the important events in the sport of tennis in 1924. It provides the results of notable tournaments throughout the year on both the men's and women's ILTF tennis circuits.

== Australian Open ==
Category	Champion(s)	Finalist(s)	Score
Men's singles	(Australia) James Anderson	(Australia) Bob Schlesinger	6–3, 6–4, 3–6, 5–7, 6–3
Women's singles	(Australia) Sylvia Lance	(Australia) Esna Boyd	6–3, 3–6, 8–6
Men's doubles	(Australia) James Anderson (Australia) Norman Brookes	(Australia) Pat O'Hara Wood (Australia) Gerald Patterson	6–2, 6–4, 6–3
Women's doubles	(Australia) Daphne Akhurst (Australia) Sylvia Lance	(Australia) Kathleen Le Messurier (Australia) Meryl O'Hara Wood	7–5, 6–2
Mixed doubles	(Australia) Daphne Akhurst (Australia) Jim Willard	(Australia) Esna Boyd (Australia) Gar Hone	6–3, 6–4

== French Open ==
Not a Grand Slam event.

== Wimbledon ==
Category	Champion(s)	Finalist(s)	Score
Men's singles	(France) Jean Borotra	(France) René Lacoste	6–1, 3–6, 6–1, 3–6, 6–4
Women's singles	(United Kingdom) Kitty McKane	(United States) Helen Wills	4–6, 6–4, 6–4
Men's doubles	(United States) Frank Hunter (United States) Vincent Richards	(United States) Watson Washburn (United States) R. Norris Williams	6–3, 3–6, 8–10, 8–6, 6–3
Women's doubles	(United States) Hazel Wightman (United States) Helen Wills	(United Kingdom) Phyllis Covell (United Kingdom) Kitty McKane	6–4, 6–4
Mixed doubles	(United Kingdom) John Gilbert (United Kingdom) Kitty McKane	(United Kingdom) Leslie Godfree (United Kingdom) Dorothy Shepherd-Barron	6–3, 3–6, 6–3

== US Open ==
Category	Champion(s)	Finalist(s)	Score
Men's singles	(United States) Bill Tilden	(United States) Bill Johnston	6–1, 9–7, 6–2
Women's singles	(United States) Helen Wills	(United States) Molla Mallory	6–1, 6–3
Men's doubles	(United States) Howard Kinsey (United States) Robert Kinsey	(Australia) Gerald Patterson (Australia) Pat O'Hara Wood	7–5, 5–7, 7–9, 6–3, 6–4
Women's doubles	(United States) Hazel Hotchkiss Wightman (United States) Helen Wills	(United States) Eleanor Goss (United States) Marion Zinderstein Jessup	6–4, 6–3
Mixed doubles	(United States) Helen Wills (United States) Vincent Richards	(United States) Molla Mallory (United States) Bill Tilden	6–8, 7–5, 6–0
