= List of Australian Open men's doubles champions =

This is a comprehensive list of all the men's doubles finals with the resulting champions for the Australian Open tennis tournament.

== Champions ==
=== Australasian Championships ===
Year	Champions	Runners-up	Score
1905	(United Kingdom) Randolph Lycett (Australia) Tom Tachell	(Australia) Edgar T. Barnard (Australia) Basil Spence	11–9, 8–6, 1–6, 4–6, 6–1
1906	(Australia) Rodney Heath (New Zealand) Anthony Wilding	(New Zealand) Harry Parker (New Zealand) Cecil Cleve Cox	6–2, 6–4, 6–2
1907	(Australia) William Gregg (New Zealand) Harry Parker	(Australia) Horace Rice (Australia) George Wright	6–2, 3–6, 6–2, 6–2
1908	(United States) Fred Alexander (Australia) Alfred Dunlop	(Australia) Granville G. Sharp (New Zealand) Anthony Wilding	6–3, 6–2, 6–1
1909	(Australia) J. P. Keane (Australia) Ernie Parker	(Australia) Tom Crooks (New Zealand) Anthony Wilding	1–6, 6–1, 6–1, 9–7
1910	(Australia) Ashley Campbell (Australia) Horace Rice	(Australia) Rodney Heath (Australia) John L. O'Dea	6–3, 6–3, 6–2
1911	(Australia) Rodney Heath (United Kingdom) Randolph Lycett	(Australia) John Addison (Australia) Norman Brookes	6–2, 7–5, 6–0
1912	(United Kingdom) James Cecil Parke (United Kingdom) Charles Dixon	(United Kingdom) Alfred Beamish (United Kingdom) Gordon Lowe	6–4, 6–4, 6–2
1913	(Australia) Alf Hedeman (Australia) Ernie Parker	(New Zealand) Harry Parker (Australia) Roy Taylor	8–6, 4–6, 6–4, 6–4
1914	(Australia) Ashley Campbell (Australia) Gerald Patterson	(Australia) Rodney Heath (Australia) Arthur O'Hara Wood	7–5, 3–6, 6–3, 6–3
1915	(Australia) Horace Rice (Australia) Clarence V. Todd	(United Kingdom) Gordon Lowe (Australia) Bert St. John	8–6, 6–4, 7–9, 6–3
1916	No competition (due to World War I)		
1917	No competition (due to World War I)		
1918	No competition (due to World War I)		
1919	(Australia) Pat O'Hara Wood (Australia) Ron Thomas	(Australia) James Anderson (Australia) Arthur Lowe	7–5, 6–1, 7–9, 3–6, 6–3
1920	(Australia) Pat O'Hara Wood (Australia) Ron Thomas	(Australia) Horace Rice (Australia) Roy Taylor	6–1, 6–0, 7–5
1921	(Australia) Stanley H. Eaton (Australia) Rice Gemmell	(Australia) N. Brearley (Australia) Edward Stokes	7–5, 6–3, 6–3
1922	(Australia) Jack Hawkes (Australia) Gerald Patterson	(Australia) James Anderson (Australia) Norman Peach	8–10, 6–0, 6–0, 7–5
1923	(Australia) Pat O'Hara Wood (Australia) Bert St. John	(Australia) Dudley Bullough (Australia) Horace Rice	6–4, 6–3, 3–6, 6–0
1924	(Australia) James Anderson (Australia) Norman Brookes	(Australia) Pat O'Hara Wood (Australia) Gerald Patterson	6–2, 6–4, 6–3
1925	(Australia) Pat O'Hara Wood (Australia) Gerald Patterson	(Australia) James Anderson (Australia) Fred Kalms	6–4, 9–7, 7–5
1926	(Australia) Jack Hawkes (Australia) Gerald Patterson	(Australia) James Anderson (Australia) Pat O'Hara Wood	6–1, 6–4, 6–2

=== Australian Championships ===
Year	Champions	Runners-up	Score
1927	(Australia) Jack Hawkes (Australia) Gerald Patterson	(Australia) Pat O'Hara Wood (Australia) Ian McInnes	8–6, 6–1, 6–2
1928	(France) Jean Borotra (France) Jacques Brugnon	(Australia) James Willard (Australia) Edgar Moon	6–2, 4–6, 6–4, 6–4
1929	(Australia) Jack Crawford (Australia) Harry Hopman	(Australia) Jack Cummings (Australia) Edgar Moon	6–1, 6–8, 4–6, 6–1, 6–3
1930	(Australia) Jack Crawford (Australia) Harry Hopman	(Australia) Jack Hawkes (Australia) Tim Fitchett	8–6, 6–1, 2–6, 6–3
1931	(Australia) Charles Donohoe (Australia) Ray Dunlop	(Australia) Jack Crawford (Australia) Harry Hopman	8–6, 6–2, 5–7, 7–9, 6–4
1932	(Australia) Jack Crawford (Australia) Edgar Moon	(Australia) Harry Hopman (Australia) Gerald Patterson	4–6, 6–4, 12–10, 6–3
1933	(United States) Keith Gledhill (United States) Ellsworth Vines	(Australia) Jack Crawford (Australia) Edgar Moon	6–4, 10–8, 6–2
1934	(United Kingdom) Pat Hughes (United Kingdom) Fred Perry	(Australia) Adrian Quist (Australia) Don Turnbull	6–8, 6–3, 6–4, 3–6, 6–3
1935	(Australia) Jack Crawford (Australia) Vivian McGrath	(United Kingdom) Pat Hughes (United Kingdom) Fred Perry	6–4, 8–6, 6–2
1936	(Australia) Adrian Quist (Australia) Don Turnbull	(Australia) Jack Crawford (Australia) Vivian McGrath	6–8, 6–2, 6–1, 3–6, 6–2
1937	(Australia) Adrian Quist (Australia) Don Turnbull	(Australia) John Bromwich (Australia) Jack Harper	6–2, 9–7, 1–6, 6–8, 6–4
1938	(Australia) John Bromwich (Australia) Adrian Quist	(Nazi Germany) Gottfried von Cramm (Nazi Germany) Henner Henkel	7–5, 6–4, 6–0
1939	(Australia) John Bromwich (Australia) Adrian Quist	(Australia) Colin Long (Australia) Don Turnbull	6–4, 7–5, 6–2
1940	(Australia) John Bromwich (Australia) Adrian Quist	(Australia) Jack Crawford (Australia) Vivian McGrath	6–3, 7–5, 6–1
1941	No competition (due to World War II) (Note: The tournament was not held from 1941 to 1945 because of World War II.)		
1942	No competition (due to World War II)		
1943	No competition (due to World War II)		
1944	No competition (due to World War II)		
1945	No competition (due to World War II)		
1946	(Australia) John Bromwich (Australia) Adrian Quist	(Australia) Max Newcombe (Australia) Leonard Schwartz	6–3, 6–1, 9–7
1947	(Australia) John Bromwich (Australia) Adrian Quist	(Australia) Frank Sedgman (Australia) George Worthington	6–1, 6–3, 6–1
1948	(Australia) John Bromwich (Australia) Adrian Quist	(Australia) Frank Sedgman (Australia) Colin Long	1–6, 6–8, 9–7, 6–3, 8–6
1949	(Australia) John Bromwich (Australia) Adrian Quist	(Australia) Geoffrey Brown (Australia) Bill Sidwell	1–6, 7–5, 6–2, 6–3
1950	(Australia) John Bromwich (Australia) Adrian Quist	(Egypt) Jaroslav Drobný (South Africa) Eric Sturgess	6–3, 5–7, 4–6, 6–3, 8–6
1951	(Australia) Frank Sedgman (Australia) Ken McGregor	(Australia) John Bromwich (Australia) Adrian Quist	11–9, 2–6, 6–3, 4–6, 6–3
1952	(Australia) Frank Sedgman (Australia) Ken McGregor	(Australia) Don Candy (Australia) Mervyn Rose	6–4, 7–5, 6–3
1953	(Australia) Lew Hoad (Australia) Ken Rosewall	(Australia) Don Candy (Australia) Mervyn Rose	9–11, 6–4, 10–8, 6–4
1954	(Australia) Mervyn Rose (Australia) Rex Hartwig	(Australia) Neale Fraser (Australia) Clive Wilderspin	6–3, 6–4, 6–2
1955	(United States) Vic Seixas (United States) Tony Trabert	(Australia) Lew Hoad (Australia) Ken Rosewall	6–3, 6–2, 2–6, 3–6, 6–1
1956	(Australia) Lewis Hoad (Australia) Ken Rosewall	(Australia) Don Candy (Australia) Mervyn Rose	10–8, 13–11, 6–4
1957	(Australia) Neale Fraser (Australia) Lew Hoad	(Australia) Malcolm Anderson (Australia) Ashley Cooper	6–3, 8–6, 6–4
1958	(Australia) Ashley Cooper (Australia) Neale Fraser	(Australia) Roy Emerson (Australia) Bob Mark	7–5, 6–8, 3–6, 6–3, 7–5
1959	(Australia) Rod Laver (Australia) Bob Mark	(Australia) Don Candy (Australia) Robert Howe	9–7, 6–4, 6–2
1960	(Australia) Rod Laver (Australia) Bob Mark	(Australia) Roy Emerson (Australia) Neale Fraser	1–6, 6–2, 6–4, 6–4
1961	(Australia) Rod Laver (Australia) Bob Mark	(Australia) Roy Emerson (Australia) Martin Mulligan	6–3, 7–5, 3–6, 9–11, 6–2
1962	(Australia) Roy Emerson (Australia) Neale Fraser	(Australia) Bob Hewitt (Australia) Fred Stolle	4–6, 4–6, 6–1, 6–4, 11–9
1963	(Australia) Bob Hewitt (Australia) Fred Stolle	(Australia) Ken Fletcher (Australia) John Newcombe	6–2, 3–6, 6–3, 3–6, 6–3
1964	(Australia) Bob Hewitt (Australia) Fred Stolle	(Australia) Roy Emerson (Australia) Ken Fletcher	6–4, 7–5, 3–6, 4–6, 14–12
1965	(Australia) John Newcombe (Australia) Tony Roche	(Australia) Roy Emerson (Australia) Fred Stolle	3–6, 4–6, 13–11, 6–3, 6–4
1966	(Australia) Roy Emerson (Australia) Fred Stolle	(Australia) John Newcombe (Australia) Tony Roche	7–9, 6–3, 6–8, 14–12, 12–10
1967	(Australia) John Newcombe (Australia) Tony Roche	(Australia) Bill Bowrey (Australia) Owen Davidson	3–6, 6–3, 7–5, 6–8, 8–6
1968	(Australia) Dick Crealy (Australia) Allan Stone	(Australia) Terry Addison (Australia) Ray Keldie	10–8, 6–4, 6–3

=== Australian Open ===
Year	Champions	Runners-up	Score
1969	(Australia) Rod Laver (Australia) Roy Emerson	(Australia) Ken Rosewall (Australia) Fred Stolle	6–4, 6–4
1970	(United States) Bob Lutz (United States) Stan Smith	(Australia) John Alexander (Australia) Phil Dent	8–6, 6–3, 6–4
1971	(Australia) John Newcombe (Australia) Tony Roche	(Netherlands) Tom Okker (United States) Marty Riessen	6–2, 7–6
1972	(Australia) Ken Rosewall (Australia) Owen Davidson	(Australia) Ross Case (Australia) Geoff Masters	3–6, 7–6, 6–2
1973	(Australia) John Newcombe (Australia) Malcolm Anderson	(Australia) John Alexander (Australia) Phil Dent	6–3, 6–4, 7–6
1974	(Australia) Ross Case (Australia) Geoff Masters	(Australia) Syd Ball (Australia) Bob Giltinan	6–7, 6–3, 6–4
1975	(Australia) John Alexander (Australia) Phil Dent	(Australia) Bob Carmichael (Australia) Allan Stone	6–3, 7–6
1976	(Australia) John Newcombe (Australia) Tony Roche	(Australia) Ross Case (Australia) Geoff Masters	7–6, 6–4
1977 (Jan) (Note: Two Australian Opens were in held in 1977 because of a date change, the first in January and the second in December.)	(United States) Arthur Ashe (Australia) Tony Roche	(United States) Charlie Pasarell (United States) Erik van Dillen	6–4, 6–4
1977 (Dec)	(Australia) Ray Ruffels (Australia) Allan Stone	(Australia) John Alexander (Australia) Phil Dent	7–6, 7–6
1978	(Poland) Wojtek Fibak (Australia) Kim Warwick	(Australia) Paul Kronk (Australia) Cliff Letcher	7–6, 7–5
1979	(Australia) Peter McNamara (Australia) Paul McNamee	(Australia) Paul Kronk (Australia) Cliff Letcher	7–6, 6–2
1980	(Australia) Mark Edmondson (Australia) Kim Warwick	(Australia) Peter McNamara (Australia) Paul McNamee	7–5, 6–4
1981	(Australia) Mark Edmondson (Australia) Kim Warwick	(United States) Hank Pfister (United States) John Sadri	6–3, 6–7, 6–3
1982	(Australia) John Alexander (Australia) John Fitzgerald	(United States) Andy Andrews (United States) John Sadri	6–4, 7–6
1983	(Australia) Mark Edmondson (Australia) Paul McNamee	(United States) Steve Denton (United States) Sherwood Stewart	6–3, 7–6
1984	(Australia) Mark Edmondson (United States) Sherwood Stewart	(Sweden) Joakim Nyström (Sweden) Mats Wilander	6–2, 6–2, 7–5
1985	(United States) Paul Annacone (South Africa) Christo van Rensburg	(Australia) Mark Edmondson (Australia) Kim Warwick	3–6, 7–6, 6–4, 6–4
1986	No competition (due to date change) (Note: The tournament was not held in 1986 because of a date change. See 1986 Australian Open tournament.)		
1987	(Sweden) Stefan Edberg (Sweden) Anders Järryd	(Australia) Peter Doohan (Australia) Laurie Warder	6–4, 6–4, 7–6
1988	(United States) Rick Leach (United States) Jim Pugh	(United Kingdom) Jeremy Bates (Sweden) Peter Lundgren	6–3, 6–2, 6–3
1989	(United States) Rick Leach (United States) Jim Pugh	(Australia) Darren Cahill (Australia) Mark Kratzmann	6–4, 6–4, 6–4
1990	(South Africa) Pieter Aldrich (South Africa) Danie Visser	(Canada) Grant Connell (Canada) Glenn Michibata	6–4, 4–6, 6–1, 6–4
1991	(United States) Scott Davis (United States) David Pate	(United States) Patrick McEnroe (United States) David Wheaton	6–7, 7–6, 6–3, 7–5
1992	(Australia) Todd Woodbridge (Australia) Mark Woodforde	(United States) Kelly Jones (United States) Rick Leach	6–4, 6–3, 6–4
1993	(South Africa) Danie Visser (Australia) Laurie Warder	(Australia) John Fitzgerald (Sweden) Anders Järryd	6–4, 6–3, 6–4
1994	(Netherlands) Jacco Eltingh (Netherlands) Paul Haarhuis	(Zimbabwe) Byron Black (United States) Jonathan Stark	6–7, 6–3, 6–4, 6–3
1995	(United States) Jared Palmer (United States) Richey Reneberg	(The Bahamas) Mark Knowles (Canada) Daniel Nestor	6–3, 3–6, 6–3, 6–2
1996	(Sweden) Stefan Edberg (Czech Republic) Petr Korda	(Canada) Sébastien Lareau (United States) Alex O'Brien	7–5, 7–5, 4–6, 6–1
1997	(Australia) Todd Woodbridge (Australia) Mark Woodforde	(Canada) Sébastien Lareau (United States) Alex O'Brien	4–6, 7–5, 7–5, 6–3
1998	(Sweden) Jonas Björkman (Netherlands) Jacco Eltingh	(Australia) Todd Woodbridge (Australia) Mark Woodforde	6–2, 5–7, 2–6, 6–4, 6–3
1999	(Sweden) Jonas Björkman (Australia) Patrick Rafter	(India) Leander Paes (India) Mahesh Bhupathi	6–3, 4–6, 6–4, 6–7^{(10–12)}, 6–4
2000	(South Africa) Ellis Ferreira (United States) Rick Leach	(Zimbabwe) Wayne Black (Australia) Andrew Kratzmann	6–4, 3–6, 6–3, 3–6, 18–16
2001	(Sweden) Jonas Björkman (Australia) Todd Woodbridge	(Zimbabwe) Byron Black (Germany) David Prinosil	6–1, 5–7, 6–4, 6–4
2002	(The Bahamas) Mark Knowles (Canada) Daniel Nestor	(France) Fabrice Santoro (France) Michaël Llodra	7–6^{(7–4)}, 6–3
2003	(France) Fabrice Santoro (France) Michaël Llodra	(The Bahamas) Mark Knowles (Canada) Daniel Nestor	6–4, 3–6, 6–3
2004	(France) Fabrice Santoro (France) Michaël Llodra	(United States) Mike Bryan (United States) Bob Bryan	7–6^{(7–4)}, 6–3
2005	(Zimbabwe) Wayne Black (Zimbabwe) Kevin Ullyett	(United States) Mike Bryan (United States) Bob Bryan	6–4, 6–4
2006	(United States) Mike Bryan (United States) Bob Bryan	(Czech Republic) Martin Damm (India) Leander Paes	4–6, 6–3, 6–4
2007	(United States) Mike Bryan (United States) Bob Bryan	(Belarus) Max Mirnyi (Sweden) Jonas Björkman	7–5, 7–5
2008	(Israel) Jonathan Erlich (Israel) Andy Ram	(France) Arnaud Clément (France) Michaël Llodra	7–5, 7–6^{(7–4)}
2009	(United States) Mike Bryan (United States) Bob Bryan	(India) Mahesh Bhupathi (The Bahamas) Mark Knowles	2–6, 7–5, 6–0
2010	(United States) Mike Bryan (United States) Bob Bryan	(Canada) Daniel Nestor (Serbia) Nenad Zimonjić	6–3, 6–7^{(5–7)}, 6–3
2011	(United States) Mike Bryan (United States) Bob Bryan	(India) Mahesh Bhupathi (India) Leander Paes	6–3, 6–4
2012	(India) Leander Paes (Czech Republic) Radek Štěpánek	(United States) Mike Bryan (United States) Bob Bryan	7–6^{(7–1)}, 6–2
2013	(United States) Mike Bryan (United States) Bob Bryan	(Netherlands) Robin Haase (Netherlands) Igor Sijsling	6–3, 6–4
2014	(Poland) Łukasz Kubot (Sweden) Robert Lindstedt	(United States) Eric Butorac (South Africa) Raven Klaasen	6–3, 6–3
2015	(Italy) Simone Bolelli (Italy) Fabio Fognini	(France) Pierre-Hugues Herbert (France) Nicolas Mahut	6–4, 6–4
2016	(United Kingdom) Jamie Murray (Brazil) Bruno Soares	(Canada) Daniel Nestor (Czech Republic) Radek Štěpánek	2–6, 6–4, 7–5
2017	(Finland) Henri Kontinen (Australia) John Peers	(United States) Bob Bryan (United States) Mike Bryan	7–5, 7–5
2018	(Austria) Oliver Marach (Croatia) Mate Pavić	(Colombia) Juan Sebastián Cabal (Colombia) Robert Farah	6–4, 6–4
2019	(France) Pierre-Hugues Herbert (France) Nicolas Mahut	(Finland) Henri Kontinen (Australia) John Peers	6–4, 7–6^{(7–1)}
2020	(United States) Rajeev Ram (United Kingdom) Joe Salisbury	(Australia) Max Purcell (Australia) Luke Saville	6–4, 6–2
2021	(Slovakia) Filip Polášek (Croatia) Ivan Dodig	(United States) Rajeev Ram (United Kingdom) Joe Salisbury	6–3, 6–4
2022	(Australia) Nick Kyrgios (Australia) Thanasi Kokkinakis	(Australia) Matthew Ebden (Australia) Max Purcell	7–5, 6–4
2023	(Australia) Rinky Hijikata (Australia) Jason Kubler	(Monaco) Hugo Nys (Poland) Jan Zieliński	6–4, 7–6^{(7–4)}
2024	(India) Rohan Bopanna (Australia) Matthew Ebden	(Italy) Simone Bolelli (Italy) Andrea Vavassori	7–6^{(7–0)}, 7–5
2025	(Finland) Harri Heliövaara (United Kingdom) Henry Patten	(Italy) Simone Bolelli (Italy) Andrea Vavassori	6–7^{(16–18)}, 7–6^{(7–5)}, 6–3
2026	(United States) Christian Harrison (United Kingdom) Neal Skupski	(Australia) Jason Kubler (Australia) Marc Polmans	7–6^{(7–4)}, 6–4

== See also ==
Australian Open other competitions

- List of Australian Open men's singles champions
- List of Australian Open women's singles champions
- List of Australian Open women's doubles champions
- List of Australian Open mixed doubles champions

Grand Slam men's doubles

- List of French Open men's doubles champions
- List of Wimbledon gentlemen's doubles champions
- List of US Open men's doubles champions
- List of Grand Slam men's doubles champions
