= 1924 Australasian Championships – Men's doubles =

Men's doubles
- 1924 Australasian Championships

Final
- Champions: (Australia) James Anderson (Australia) Norman Brookes
- Runners-up: (Australia) Pat O'Hara Wood (Australia) Gerald Patterson
- Score: 6–2, 6–4, 6–3

Details
- Draw: 20
- Seeds: 4

Events
Singles	men	women		boys	girls
Doubles	men	women	mixed	boys	girls
← 1923 ·	Australasian Championships	· 1925 →

The second seeds James Anderson and Norman Brookes defeated the first-seeded Pat O'Hara Wood and Gerald Patterson 6–2, 6–4, 6–3 in the final, to win the men's doubles tennis title at the 1924 Australasian Championships.

== Seeds ==
1. (Australia) Pat O'Hara Wood / (Australia) Gerald Patterson (final)
2. (Australia) James Anderson / (Australia) Norman Brookes (champions)
3. (Australia) Tim Fitchett / (Australia) Rupert Wertheim (semifinals)
4. (Australia) Les Rainey / (Australia) Bob Schlesinger (quarterfinals)

== Draw ==
=== Key ===
- Q = Qualifier
- WC = Wild card
- LL = Lucky loser
- Alt = Alternate
- ITF = ITF entry
- PR = Protected ranking
- SR = Special ranking
- SE = Special exempt
- JE = Junior exempt
- JR = Junior Accelerator Programme entrant
- CO = College Accelerator Programme entrant
- NG = Next Gen Accelerator Program entrant
- w/o = Walkover
- r = Retired
- d = Defaulted

=== Finals ===
Quarterfinals
2	(Australia) James Anderson (Australia) Norman Brookes	8	3	6	6
(Australia) Charles Buckley (Australia) Norman Roberts	6	6	3	2
3	(Australia) Tim Fitchett (Australia) Rupert Wertheim	6	7	6
(Australia) Colin Gurner (Australia) Ronald Thomas	3	5	1
1	(Australia) Pat O'Hara Wood (Australia) Gerald Patterson	6	7	6
(Australia) Robert Phillips (Australia) Clarence Treloar	1	5	1
4	(Australia) Les Rainey (Australia) Bob Schlesinger	6	8	3	2
(Australia) Fred Kalms (Australia) Jim Willard	4	10	6	6

Semifinals
2	(Australia) James Anderson (Australia) Norman Brookes	6	6	6
3	(Australia) Tim Fitchett (Australia) Rupert Wertheim	4	3	4
1	(Australia) Pat O'Hara Wood (Australia) Gerald Patterson	6	8	5	6
(Australia) Fred Kalms (Australia) Jim Willard	2	6	7	2

Final
2	(Australia) James Anderson (Australia) Norman Brookes	6	6	6
1	(Australia) Pat O'Hara Wood (Australia) Gerald Patterson	2	4	3

=== Earlier rounds ===
==== Section 1 ====
First round
(Australia) Colin Gurner (Australia) Ronald Thomas	6	6	5	6
(Australia) Basil Henty (Australia) Noel Heath	1	1	7	2
(Australia) Ben Dunlop (Australia) Alec Sandral	w/o
(Australia) J. N. Fraser (Australia) Charles Lyon

Second round
2	(Australia) James Anderson (Australia) Norman Brookes	6	6	6
(Australia) Norman Strange (Australia) Bill Wise	1	3	2
(Australia) Charles Buckley (Australia) Norman Roberts	w/o
(Australia) Bill Cleland (Australia) E. M. Ladyman
3	(Australia) Tim Fitchett (Australia) Rupert Wertheim	6	4	6	2	6
(Australia) Gordon Dickinson (Australia) Ted Noske	2	6	0	6	3
(Australia) Colin Gurner (Australia) Ronald Thomas	6	6	6
(Australia) Ben Dunlop (Australia) Alec Sandral	2	1	3

Quarterfinals
2	(Australia) James Anderson (Australia) Norman Brookes	8	3	6	6
(Australia) Charles Buckley (Australia) Norman Roberts	6	6	3	2
3	(Australia) Tim Fitchett (Australia) Rupert Wertheim	6	7	6
(Australia) Colin Gurner (Australia) Ronald Thomas	3	5	1

Semifinals
2	(Australia) James Anderson (Australia) Norman Brookes	6	6	6
3	(Australia) Tim Fitchett (Australia) Rupert Wertheim	4	3	4

==== Section 2 ====
First round
1	(Australia) Pat O'Hara Wood (Australia) Gerald Patterson	4	7	7	6
(Australia) Gar Hone (Australia) Ian McInnes	6	5	5	4
(Australia) Jack Clemenger (Australia) M. Henry Marsh	w/o
(Australia) Rodney Heath (Australia) F. Pleasance

Second round
1	(Australia) Pat O'Hara Wood (Australia) Gerald Patterson	6	7	6	6
(Australia) Jack Clemenger (Australia) M. Henry Marsh	3	9	3	3
(Australia) Robert Phillips (Australia) Clarence Treloar	6	6	3	3	8
(Australia) Horace Crebbin (Australia) Hector Wallace	4	2	6	6	6
4	(Australia) Les Rainey (Australia) Bob Schlesinger	6	6	6
(Australia) Colin Newton (Australia) Harold Richmond	1	2	2
(Australia) Fred Kalms (Australia) Jim Willard	6	11	8	6	^{[a]}
(Australia) Frank Drews (Australia) W. H. Smith	4	13	6	3

Quarterfinals
1	(Australia) Pat O'Hara Wood (Australia) Gerald Patterson	6	7	6
(Australia) Robert Phillips (Australia) Clarence Treloar	1	5	1
4	(Australia) Les Rainey (Australia) Bob Schlesinger	6	8	3	2
(Australia) Fred Kalms (Australia) Jim Willard	4	10	6	6

Semifinals
1	(Australia) Pat O'Hara Wood (Australia) Gerald Patterson	6	8	5	6
(Australia) Fred Kalms (Australia) Jim Willard	2	6	7	2

== Notes ==
- ^{a} Some sources give 12–14 as a result of the second set.
