= 1925 Australasian Championships – Men's singles =

Men's singles
- 1925 Australasian Championships

Final
- Champion: (Australia) James Anderson
- Runner-up: (Australia) Gerald Patterson
- Score: 11–9, 2–6, 6–2, 6–3

Details
- Draw: 59
- Seeds: 8

Events
Singles	men	women		boys	girls
Doubles	men	women	mixed	boys	girls
- Australasian Championships

First-seeded James Anderson defeated Gerald Patterson 11–9, 2–6, 6–2, 6–3 in the final to win the men's singles tennis title at the 1925 Australasian Championships.

== Seeds ==
The seeded players are listed below. James Anderson is the champion; others show the round in which they were eliminated.

1. (Australia) James Anderson (champion)
2. (Australia) Gerald Patterson (finalist)
3. (Australia) Pat O'Hara Wood (semifinals)
4. (Australia) Norman Peach (quarterfinals)
5. (Australia) Fred Kalms (quarterfinals)
6. (Australia) Bob Schlesinger (semifinals)
7. (Australia) Gar Hone (quarterfinals)
8. (Australia) Jack Cummings (second round)

== Draw ==
=== Key ===
- Q = Qualifier
- WC = Wild card
- LL = Lucky loser
- r = Retired

=== Finals ===
Quarterfinals
2	(Australia) Gerald Patterson	6	6	9
(Australia) Aubrey Willard	0	2	7
4	(Australia) Norman Peach	3	2	2
6	(Australia) Bob Schlesinger	6	6	6
1	(Australia) James Anderson	6	6	8
7	(Australia) Gar Hone	2	0	6
3	(Australia) Pat O'Hara Wood	6	6	6
5	(Australia) Fred Kalms	3	2	3

Semifinals
2	(Australia) Gerald Patterson	6	4	6	6
6	(Australia) Bob Schlesinger	4	6	4	4
1	(Australia) James Anderson	6	6	6
3	(Australia) Pat O'Hara Wood	2	3	3

Finals
2	(Australia) Gerald Patterson	9	6	2	3
1	(Australia) James Anderson	11	2	6	6

=== Earlier rounds ===
==== Section 1 ====
First round
2	(Australia) Patterson	6	6	6
(Australia) Chave	0	1	2
(Australia) Goodman	4	6	6	7
(Australia) E. Hatherley	6	1	4	5
(Australia) Roberts	6	6	6
(Australia) Trounce	4	4	3
8	(Australia) Cummings	7	7	6
(Australia) Ashcroft	5	5	1
(Australia) J. Willard	6	9	6
(Australia) Oxenham	1	7	1
(Australia) A. Willard	6	6	6
(Australia) Bulcock	4	1	2
(Australia) McDougall	6	6	7
(Australia) Fitchett	3	2	5

Second round
2	(Australia) Patterson	6	6	6
(Australia) Goodman	0	2	4
(Australia) Roberts	w/o
(Australia) Marsh
8	(Australia) Cummings	4	3	3
(Australia) J. Willard	6	6	6
(Australia) A. Willard	8	6	2	6	6
(Australia) McDougall	10	1	6	1	2

Third round
2	(Australia) Patterson	6	6	6
(Australia) Roberts	3	3	2
(Australia) J. Willard
(Australia) A. Willard	w/o

Quarterfinals
2	(Australia) Patterson	6	6	9
(Australia) A. Willard	0	2	7

==== Section 2 ====
First round
4	(Australia) N. Peach	6	6	6
(Australia) Cryle	1	0	4
(Australia) Smith	6	6	6
(Australia) W. J. Baldock	0	2	0
(Australia) Coram	5	7	3	7	6
(Australia) James	7	5	6	5	3
6	(Australia) Schlesinger	6	6
(Australia) Gibbes	4	3	r
(Australia) Williams	6	6	9
(Australia) B. B. Loel	3	1	7
(Australia) Carmichael	8	6	6
(Australia) L. Gibson	6	4	3

Second round
4	(Australia) N. Peach	6	6	6
(Australia) Smith	1	2	2
(Australia) Blaxland	6	10	7
(Australia) Coram	2	8	5
6	(Australia) Schlesinger	6	6	6
(Australia) Williams	3	1	2
(Australia) Carmichael	6	6	6
(Australia) Lamb	4	1	3

Third round
4	(Australia) N. Peach	6	6	6
(Australia) Blaxland	3	3	2
6	(Australia) Schlesinger	6	6	6
(Australia) Carmichael	4	1	3

Quarterfinals
4	(Australia) N. Peach	3	2	2
6	(Australia) Schlesinger	6	6	6

==== Section 3 ====
First round
1	(Australia) Anderson	6	6	6
(Australia) C. Moon	0	0	0
(Fiji) Caldwell	6	6	6
(Australia) Dunlop	4	4	4
(Australia) Bullough	6	6	4	8
(Australia) Berriman	4	2	6	6
7	(Australia) Hone	8	6	7
(Australia) Baker	6	2	5
(Australia) Fitzgerald	0	2	6	6	6
(Australia) F. Peach	6	6	4	2	4
(Australia) Garvin	6	6	3	6
(Australia) Berckelman	0	2	6	0
(Australia) G. Moon	6	6	1	8
(Australia) E. M. Ladyman	1	3	6	6

Second round
1	(Australia) Anderson	6	6	6
(Fiji) Caldwell	2	2	4
(Australia) Moxon	3	1	3
(Australia) Bullough	6	6	6
7	(Australia) Hone	6	2	6	4	9
(Australia) Fitzgerald	2	6	3	6	7
(Australia) Garvin	3	1	0
(Australia) G. Moon	6	6	6

Third round
1	(Australia) Anderson	6	6	7
(Australia) Bullough	0	1	5
7	(Australia) Hone	6	6	6
(Australia) G. Moon	4	0	3

Quarterfinals
1	(Australia) Anderson	6	6	8
7	(Australia) Hone	2	0	6

==== Section 4 ====
First round
3	(Australia) O'Hara Wood	6	6	6
(Australia) A. G. Illingworth	2	1	1
(Australia) Gemmell	7	6	6
(Australia) Coldham	5	0	4
(Australia) Colvin	6	6	6
(Australia) D. B. Reid	4	3	4
(Australia) Poulton	6	6	5	12
(Australia) Turner	0	4	7	10
5	(Australia) Kalms	6	6	6
(Australia) Wertheim	1	3	2
(Australia) Treloar	10	6	5	9	6
(Australia) Medcalf	8	4	7	11	2
(Australia) Haege	6	6	10
(Australia) V. J. Cornell	4	2	8

Second round
3	(Australia) O'Hara Wood	6	4	4	7	6
(Australia) Gemmell	1	6	6	5	2
(Australia) Colvin	6	6	6
(Australia) Poulton	4	4	4
5	(Australia) Kalms	6
(Australia) Treloar	2	r
(Australia) Haege	4	6	6	6	6
(Australia) Spencer	6	2	8	2	4

Third round
3	(Australia) O'Hara Wood	6	6	6
(Australia) Colvin	3	0	0
5	(Australia) Kalms	7	2
(Australia) Haege	5	1^{r}

Quarterfinals
3	(Australia) O'Hara Wood	6	6	6
5	(Australia) Kalms	3	2	3

Preceded by 1924 U.S. National Championships	Grand Slam Men's Singles	Succeeded by 1925 French Championships
