= List of Australia Davis Cup team representatives =

This is a list of tennis players who have represented the Australia Davis Cup team in an official Davis Cup match since 1923. It also includes players who competed for the Australasia Davis Cup team, a combined side featuring both Australians and New Zealanders from 1905 (as Australia assumed all records). Players still active are in bold.

== Players ==
As of 21 September 2026

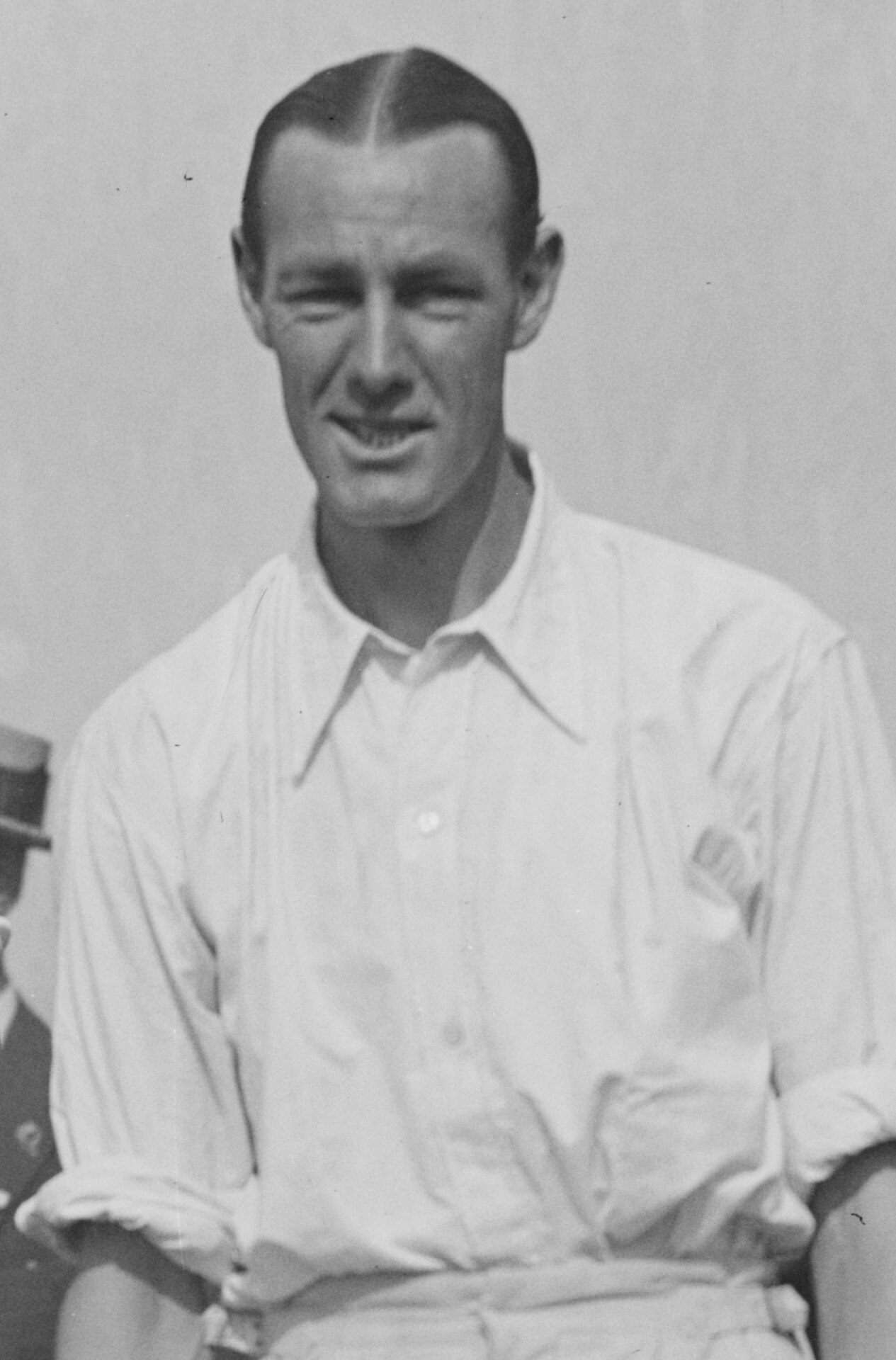
James Anderson

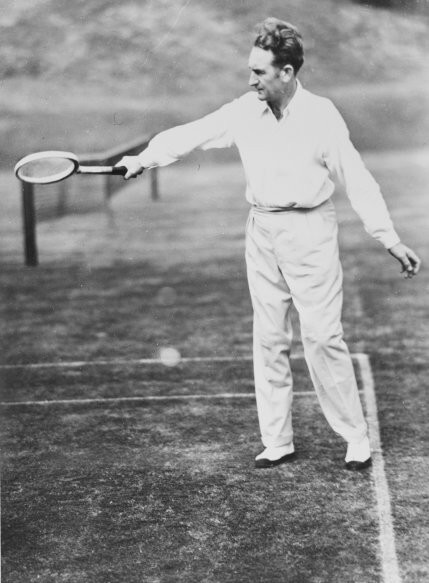
Jack Crawford

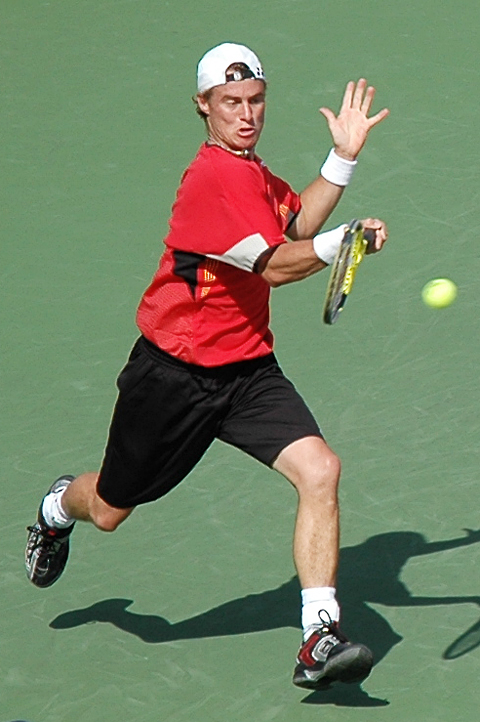
Lleyton Hewitt

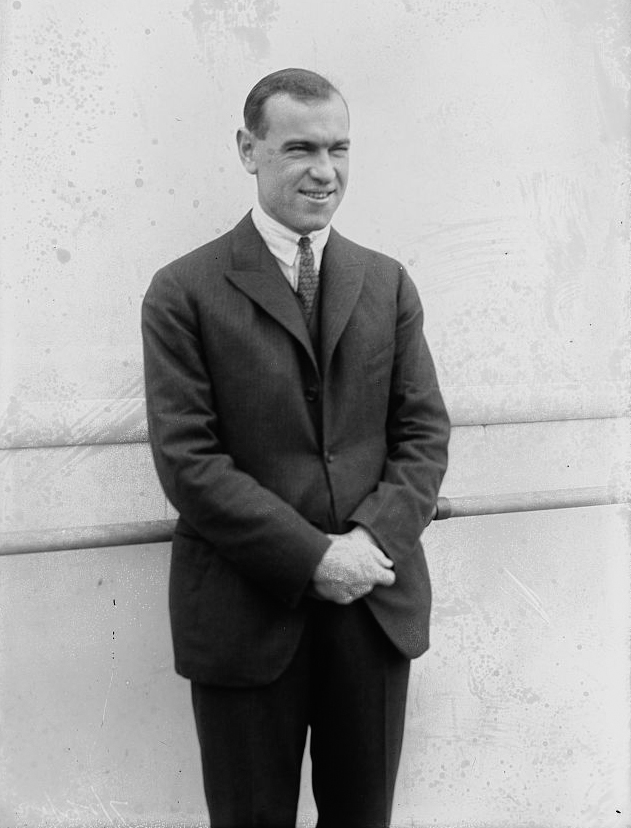
Gerald Patterson

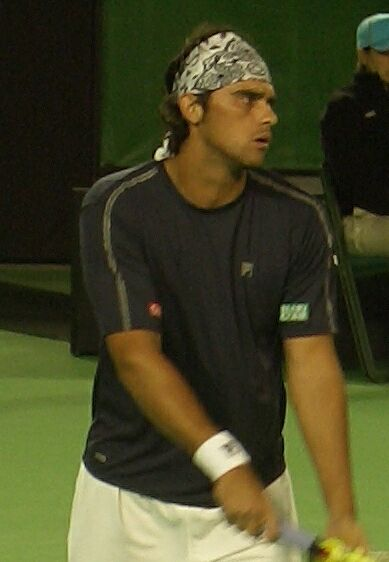
Mark Philippoussis

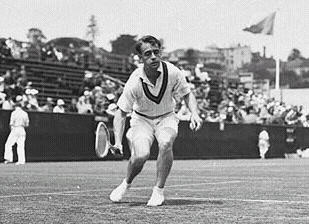
Adrian Quist

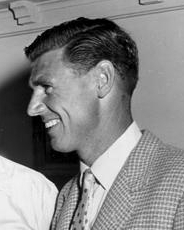
Frank Sedgman

Player	Years played	First year	Ties	Win-loss record		Total record		
Player	Years played	First year	Ties	Singles	Doubles	P	W–L	%
John Alexander	11	1968	20	17–9	10–5	41	27–14	65.85%
James Anderson	5	1919	15	20–7	8–1	36	28–8	77.78%
Mal Anderson	4	1957	8	11–3	2–3	19	13–6	68.42%
Wayne Arthurs	8	1999	19	10–4	8–6	28	18–10	64.29%
Carsten Ball	3	2008	5	3–2	3–0	8	6–2	75%
Syd Ball	1	1974	1	1–0	0–0	1	1–0	100%
**Alex Bolt**	1	2021	1	0–0	1–0	1	1–0	100%
Bill Bowrey	2	1968	2	2–2	0–0	4	2–2	50%
John Bromwich	7	1937	23	19–11	20–1	51	39–12	76.47%
Norman Brookes	9	1905	14	18–7	10–4	39	28–11	71.79%
Geoff Brown	2	1947	3	2–0	1–1	4	3–1	75%
Darren Cahill	4	1988	7	2–4	4–0	10	6–4	60%
Ross Case	5	1971	5	3–2	0–2	7	3–4	42.86%
Pat Cash	8	1983	19	23–7	8–3	41	31–10	75.61%
Ashley Cooper	2	1957	2	2–2	0–0	4	2–2	50%
John Cooper	2	1971	4	3–3	1–0	7	4–3	57.14%
Jack Crawford	8	1928	23	23–16	13–5	57	36–21	63.16%
Dick Crealy	1	1970	3	3–2	1–0	6	4–2	66.67%
**Alex de Minaur**	8	2018	25	19–10	0–1	30	19–11	63.33%
Phil Dent	8	1969	13	6–2	7–4	19	13–6	68.42%
Colin Dibley	3	1971	9	8–4	5–2	19	13–6	68.42%
Peter Doohan	1	1987	3	0–0	3–0	3	3–0	100%
Stanley Doust	1	1913	1	0–2	1–0	3	1–2	33.33%
Scott Draper	1	2002	2	1–2	0–0	3	1–2	33.33%
Brad Drewett	1	1980	1	0–0	1–0	1	1–0	100%
**James Duckworth**	2	2021	3	0–2	0–1	3	0–3	0%
Alfred Dunlop	3	1905	4	0–0	3–1	4	3–1	80%
**Matthew Ebden**	7	2012	17	4–0	11–3	18	15–3	77.78%
Mark Edmondson	8	1977	19	11–7	8–3	29	19–10	65.52%
Roy Emerson	9	1959	18	21–2	13–2	38	34–4	89.47%
John Fitzgerald	10	1982	23	11–8	8–6	35	19–14	57.58%
Neale Fraser	6	1958	11	11–1	7–2	21	18–3	85.71%
Rod Frawley	1	1980	1	1–0	0–0	1	1–0	100%
Richard Fromberg	6	1990	9	10–4	1–0	15	11–4	73.33%
Bob Giltinan	2	1971	4	1–2	2–0	5	3–2	60%
Sam Groth	4	2014	8	2–4	3–3	12	5–7	41.67%
Chris Guccione	9	2005	18	9–6	9–2	26	18–8	69.23%
Paul Hanley	4	2006	10	0–2	8–2	12	8–4	66.67%
Rex Hartwig	3	1953	8	6–0	6–1	13	12–1	92.31%
John Hawkes	3	1921	10	6–7	5–2	20	11–9	55%
Rodney Heath	2	1911	2	1–2	0–0	3	1–2	33.33%
Lleyton Hewitt	19	1999	43	42–14	17–7	80	59–21	73.75%
**Rinky Hijikata**	2	2025	3	0–1	2–1	4	2–2	50%
Lew Hoad	4	1953	9	10–2	7–2	21	17–4	80.95%
Harry Hopman	3	1928	7	4–5	4–3	16	8–8	50%
Andrew Ilie	1	2002	1	0–2	0–0	2	0–2	0%
Alfred Jones	1	1913	1	0–0	1–0	1	1–0	100%
Alun Jones	1	2008	1	1–0	0–0	1	1–0	100%
Brydan Klein	1	2009	1	0–1	0–0	1	0–1	0%
**Thanasi Kokkinakis**	5	2014	14	8–8	0–0	16	8–8	40%
Mark Kratzmann	2	1990	3	0–0	2–1	3	2–1	66.67%
**Jason Kubler**	2	2022	3	2–1	0–0	3	2–1	66.67%
**Nick Kyrgios**	7	2013	11	11–5	0–1	17	11–6	64.71%
Rod Laver	5	1959	11	16–4	4–0	24	20–4	83.33%
Colin Long	2	1947	7	0–0	5–2	7	5–2	71.43%
Peter Luczak	5	2005	7	4–6	0–0	10	4–6	40%
Bob Mark	1	1959	1	1–0	0–0	1	1–0	100%
Geoff Masters	5	1972	9	2–0	6–3	11	8–3	72.73%
Wally Masur	8	1985	16	16–14	1–1	32	17–15	53.13%
Marinko Matosevic	3	2011	4	2–2	1–0	5	3–2	60%
Vivian McGrath	5	1933	14	11–12	1–2	26	12–14	46.15%
Ken McGregor	3	1950	5	4–3	2–0	9	6–3	66.67%
Ian McInnes	1	1923	1	0–1	0–0	1	0–1	0%
Peter McNamara	5	1980	10	9–7	1–4	21	10–11	47.62%
Paul McNamee	7	1980	17	12–6	7–5	30	19–11	63.33%
John Millman	3	2017	5	3–3	0–0	6	3–3	50%
Edgar Moon	1	1930	2	4–0	0–0	9	4–0	100%
Jamie Morgan	1	1994	1	1–1	0–0	2	1–1	50%
John Newcombe	8	1963	15	16–7	9–2	34	25–9	73.53%
Pat O'Hara-Wood	2	1922	9	9–5	8–1	15	17–6	73.91%
Dinny Pails	2	1946	4	3–5	0–0	8	3–5	37.5%
Gerald Patterson	6	1919	16	21–10	11–4	46	32–14	69.57%
Norman Peach	1	1921	1	2–0	0–0	2	2–0	100%
**John Peers**	7	2016	16	0–1	8–8	17	8–9	46.67%
Mark Philippoussis	8	1995	13	13–10	0–0	23	13–10	56.52%
Leslie Poidevin	1	1906	1	0–2	0–1	3	0–3	0%
**Alexei Popyrin**	4	2019	7	4–3	0–0	7	4–3	50%
**Max Purcell**	4	2022	12	0–2	10–2	14	10–4	71.43%
Adrian Quist	9	1933	28	24–10	19–3	56	43–13	76.79%
Patrick Rafter	8	1994	18	18–10	3–1	32	21–11	65.63%
Todd Reid	1	2004	1	0–1	0–0	1	0–1	0%
Horace Rice	1	1913	1	0–2	0–0	2	0–2	0%
Tony Roche	9	1964	12	7–3	7–2	19	14–5	73.68%
Mervyn Rose	2	1951	2	0–2	1–0	3	1–2	33.33%
Ken Rosewall	6	1953	11	17–2	2–1	22	19–3	86.36%
Ray Ruffels	3	1968	5	4–4	1–1	9	5–5	50%
Luke Saville	1	2022	1	0–0	0–1	1	0–1	0%
Richard Schlesinger	1	1923	1	0–1	0–0	1	0–1	0%
Leonard Schwartz	1	1938	1	1–0	0–0	1	1–0	100%
Frank Sedgman	4	1949	10	16–3	9–0	28	25–3	89.29%
Bill Sidwell	2	1948	8	10–5	2–1	18	12–6	66.67%
Clifford Sproule	1	1932	1	1–0	0–0	1	1–0	100%
Fred Stolle	3	1964	6	10–2	3–1	16	13–3	81.25%
Sandon Stolle	3	1997	6	1–0	1–4	6	2–4	33.33%
Jason Stoltenberg	4	1989	8	9–5	0–0	14	9–5	64.29%
Allan Stone	2	1970	5	2–0	4–0	6	6–0	100%
**Jordan Thompson**	9	2017	16	5–5	6–3	19	11–8	57.89%
Clarence Todd	1	1921	4	1–0	4–0	5	5–0	100%
**Bernard Tomic**	6	2010	12	17–4	0–0	21	17–4	80.95%
Don Turnbull	2	1933	3	1–0	1–1	3	2–1	66.67%
**Aleks Vukic**	1	2025	2	1–1	0–0	2	1–1	50%
Kim Warwick	2	1978	2	1–2	1–0	4	2–2	50%
Rupert Wertheim	1	1922	1	0–0	1–0	1	1–0	100%
Tony Wilding (Note: Wilding was a New Zealand national participating for Australasia)	6	1905	11	15–6	6–3	30	21–9	70%
James Willard	1	1930	3	0–0	3–0	3	3–0	100%
Todd Woodbridge	14	1991	32	5–4	25–7	41	30–11	73.17%
Mark Woodforde	10	1988	24	4–10	17–5	36	21–15	58.33%
