= New South Wales Hard Court Championships =

Former tennis tournament in New South Wales

Defunct tennis tournament
- Tour: ILTF Australasia Circuit (1915–72); ILTF Independent Tour (1973–84); Tennis Australia Circuit (1985–88)
- Founded: 1915; 110 years ago
- Abolished: 1983; 42 years ago
- Location: Multiple
- Venue: Multiple
- Surface: Clay (1915-83)

The New South Wales Hard Court Championships was a men's and women's open tennis tournament founded in 1915, and first held at Dubbo, New South Wales, Australia. It was first organised by the Dubbo District Tennis Association in conjunction with the New South Wales Lawn Tennis Association and was played on clay courts. It was staged as part of ILTF Australasia Circuit a sub circuit of the ILTF World Circuit until 1972, then became part of the ILTF Independent Tour until 1984 and finally part of the Tennis Australia Circuit till 1988 when it was discontinued as a senior event.

== History ==
The tournament was founded in on 26 June 1915 and was held in Dubbo, New South Wales, Australia. The event was first organised by the Dubbo District Tennis Association in conjunction with the New South Wales Lawn Tennis Association. The first men's singles champion was Clarence Todd who defeated Noel Heath in straight sets. The first winner of the women's championship was a Miss Elliott. In 1922 the LTAA was split up into two separate tennis for Australia and New Zealand at which the newly formed Lawn Tennis Association of Australasia had oversight of this event. In 1924 as tennis was continuing to thrive in Australia a New South Wales Hardcourt Tennis Association was founded, it then became responsible for organising the championships.

It was staged as part of ILTF Australasia Circuit a sub circuit of the ILTF World Circuit until 1972 when it became part of the ILTF Independent Tour until 1984 and finally the Tennis Australia Circuit until 1988 when it was part of the Australia Satellite Circuit then was discontinued. The final known winner of the men's singles championship was Brett Andrews, and the final winner of the women's event was Sally McCann who defeated Kristine Radford. The tournament was staged in Dubbo the most times throughout its run with thirty five editions played there. It was also staged in other towns and cities in New South Wales including Armidale, Bathurst, Cootamundra, Cowra, Gloucester, Goulburn, Grafton, Grenfell, Gunnedah, Newcastle, Orange, Parkes, Quirindi, Sydney, Tamworth, Wagga Wagga, Wollongong and Young.

== Finals ==
=== Men's singles ===
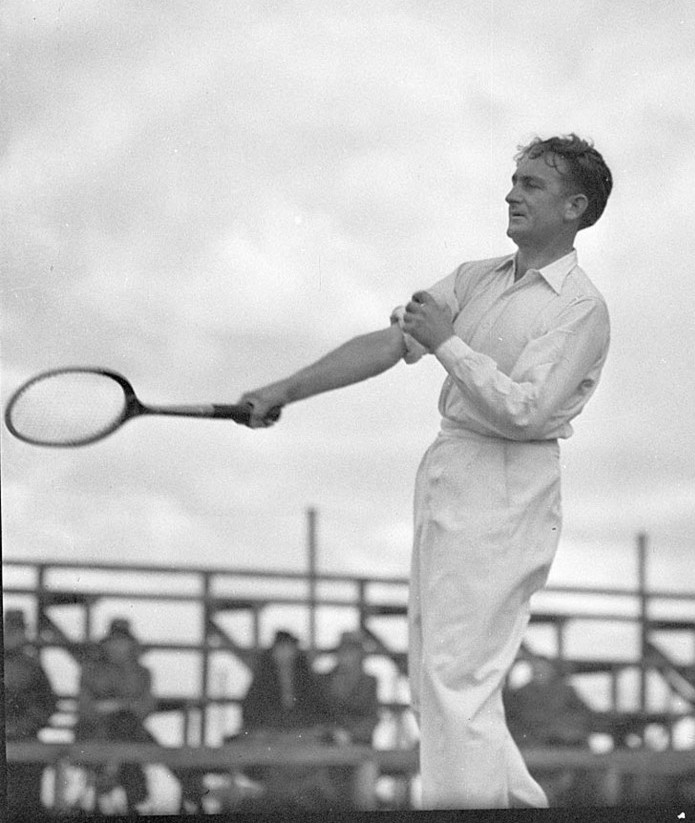
Jack Crawford c. 1938 won 5 championship singles titles

(incomplete roll)

Year	Location	Champions	Runners-up	Score
↓ ILTF World Circuit ↓
1915	Dubbo	(Australia) Clarence Todd	(Australia) Noel Heath	6–1, 9–7.
1916/1918	Not held (due to World War I)			
1919	Dubbo	(Australia) Matthew (Henry) Marsh	(Australia) Jack Logan	6–3, 6–2.
1920	Dubbo	(Australia) Clarence Todd (2)	(Australia) Henry Marsh	7–5, 6–2.
1921	Dubbo	(Australia) Horace Rice	(Australia) James Bayley	6–2, 9–7.
1922	Dubbo	(Australia) Stewart Henderson	(Australia) Clarence Todd	6–3, 5–7, 6–4.
1923	Dubbo	(Australia) James Bayley	(Australia) Horace Rice	6–0, 6–2.
1924	Dubbo	(Australia) James Anderson	(Australia) Bertram George (Bert) Cooke	6–1, 6–1.
1925	Dubbo	(Australia) James Willard	(Australia) Jack Cummings	6–1, 6–3.
1926	Dubbo	(Australia) Richard Schlesinger	(Australia) James Willard	6–4, 5–7, 7–5.
1927	Dubbo	(Australia) Harry Hopman	(Australia) James Willard	6–3, 9–7.
1928	Dubbo	(Australia) Fred Kalms	(Australia) Norman Peach	6–1, 6–2.
1929	Dubbo	(Australia) Jack Crawford	(Australia) James Bayley	6–4, 6–1.
1930	Dubbo	(Australia) Ray Dunlop	(Australia) James Bayley	6–3, 1–6, 6–4.
1931	Dubbo	(Australia) Harry Hopman (2)	(Australia) James Willard	6–3, 7–5.
1932	Dubbo	(Australia) Vivian McGrath	(Australia) James Willard	6–3, 2–6, 6–2.
1933	Dubbo	(Australia) Ray Dunlop (2)	(Australia) William Bruce Walker	9–7, 7–5.
1934	Dubbo	(Australia) John Bromwich	(Australia) Neil Leonard Turvey	6–2, 6–3.
1935	Dubbo	(Australia) Vivian McGrath (2)	(Australia) John Bromwich	7–5, 6–2.
1936	Dubbo	(Australia) Vivian McGrath (3)	(Australia) Jack Crawford	6–1, 8–6.
1937	Dubbo	(Australia) Neil Leonard Turvey	(Australia) Dr. John Walton Spence	6–2, 6–3.
1938	Dubbo	(Australia) Jack Crawford (2)	(Australia) Vivian McGrath	6–3, 0–6, 6–3.
1939	Dubbo	(Australia) Vivian McGrath (4)	(Australia) Leonard Schwartz	6–4, 6–3.
1940	Dubbo	(Australia) Jack Crawford (3)	(Australia) John Bromwich	6–4, 2–6, 7–5.
1941/1944	Not held (due to World War II)			
1945	Dubbo	(Australia) Geoff Brown	(Australia) Earl Sieler	6–2, 6–3.
1946	Dubbo	(Australia) Colin Long	(Australia) Don Rocavert	6–3, 5–7, 6–4.
1947	Dubbo	(Australia) Adrian Quist	(Australia) George Worthington	6–3, 3–6, 6–3.
1948	Dubbo	(Australia) Jack Crawford (4)	(Australia) Robert McCarthy	3–6, 6–3, 6–3.
1949	Dubbo	(Australia) Jack Crawford (5)	(Australia) Robert McCarthy	3–6, 6–3, 7–5.
1950	Dubbo	(Australia) Jim Gilchrist	(Australia) Maxwell (Max) Anderson	3–6, 6–4, 6–2.
1951	Dubbo	(Australia) Lew Hoad	(Australia) George Worthington	7–5, 6–4.
1952	Dubbo	(Australia) Don Candy	(Australia) Ross Sheriff	6–3, 6–2.
1953	Dubbo	(Australia) Mervyn Rose	(Australia) Lew Hoad	2–6, 6–4, 6–4.
1954	Dubbo	(Australia) George Worthington	(Australia) Mervyn Rose	6–2, 6–8, 6–2.
1955	Armidale	(Australia) Lew Hoad (2)	(Australia) Ken Rosewall	6–3, 6–3.
1956	Wagga Wagga	(Australia) Ken Rosewall	(Australia) Neale Fraser	6–2, 6–4.
1957	Dubbo	(Australia) Bob Mark	(Australia) Neale Frase	6–2, 7–9, 10–8.
1958	Newcastle	(Australia) Ashley Cooper	(Australia) Bob Mark	6–3, 6–4.
1959	Goulburn	(Australia) Neale Fraser	(Australia) Bob Howe	6–4, 6–3.
1960	Bathurst	(South Africa) Bob Hewitt	(Australia) Rod Laver	9–11, 6–4, 6–3.
1961	Grafton	(South Africa) Bob Hewitt (2)	(Australia) Fred Stolle	6–4, 4–6, 8–6.
1962	Young	(Australia) John Newcombe	(Australia) Geoff Pollard	6–2, 6–2.
1963	Dubbo	(Australia) Tony Roche	(Australia) Dick Crealy	6–0, 6–3.
1964	Tamworth	(Australia) Martin Mulligan	(Australia) Fred Stolle	6–3, 6–3.
1965	Wollongong	(Australia) John Newcombe	(Australia) Tony Roche	7–5, 3–6, 6–3.
1966	Parkes	(Australia) Tony Roche (2)	(Australia) Fred Stolle	6–2, 6–3, 6–3.
1967	Gunnedah	(Australia) Tony Roche (3)	(Australia) Bill Bowrey	6–2, 6–0.
1968	Wollongong	(Australia) Rod Brent	(Australia) Dick Crealy	6–3, 3–6, 6–4.
↓ Open era ↓
1969	Cowra	(Australia) Dick Crealy	(Australia) Ray Ruffels	6–3, 0–6, 6–3.
1970	Newcastle	(Australia) Colin Dibley	(Australia) Peter Doerner	6–3, 6–4.
1971	Goulburn	(Australia) Colin Dibley (2)	(Australia) Bob Giltinan	5–7, 6–3, 6–4.
1972	Grenfell	(Australia) Kim Warwick	(Australia) Graeme Thomson	6–2, 6–3.
↓ ILTF Independent Tour ↓
1973	Gloucester	(Australia) Kim Warwick (2)	(Australia) Bob Giltinan	6–2, 6–4.
1974	Quirindi	(Australia) Bill Bowrey	(Australia) Fred Stolle	6–2, 3–6, 7–5.
1975	Cootamundra	(Australia) Ian Pollard	(Australia) John Marks	4–6, 6–4, 6–3.
1976	Grafton	(Australia) Ken Rosewall (2)	(Australia) Mark Edmondson	6–1, 6–2.
1977	Orange	(Australia) John Marks	(Australia) Bob Giltinan	6–4, 1–6, 6–1.
1978	Wagga Wagga	(Australia) Steven Wright	(Australia) R. Swaysland	6–2, 7–5.
1979	Tamworth	(Australia) Alvin R. Gardiner	(Australia) Victor Eke	6–2, 6–4.
1980	Orange	(Australia) John Fitzgerald	(Australia) Wally Masur	7–6, 6–3.
1981	Wagga Wagga	(Australia) Terry Rocavert	(Australia) Peter Johnston	2–6, 6–3, 7–5.
1982	Grafton	(Australia) Brett Edwards	(Australia) Ken Rosewall	6–4, 6–2.

=== Women's singles ===
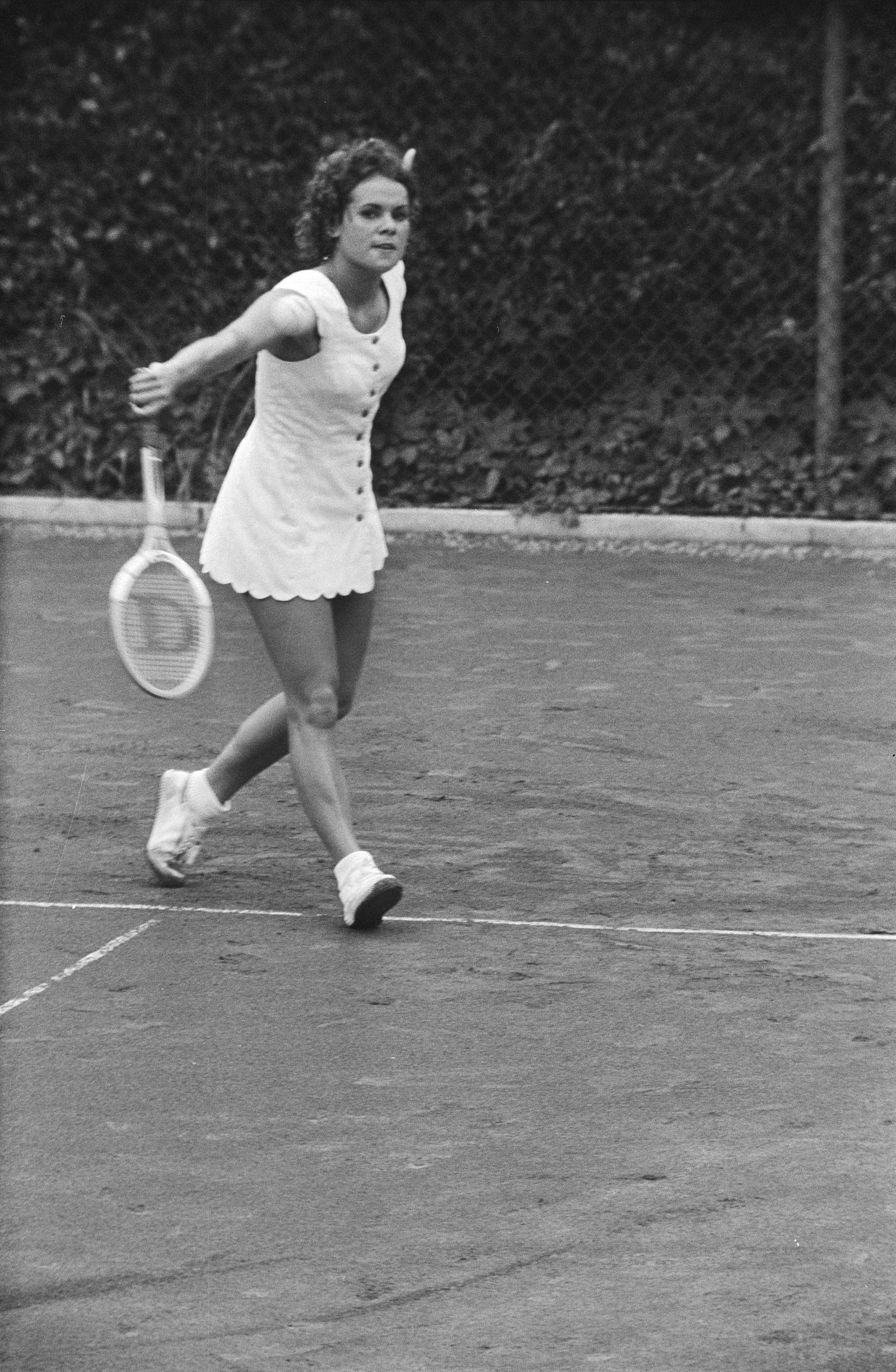
Evonne Goolagong c. 1971 won 6 championship singles titles

(incomplete roll)

Year	Location	Champions	Runners-up	Score
↓ ILTF World Circuit ↓
1915	Dubbo	(Australia) Miss Elliott	(Australia) Miss M Morgan	3–6, 6–2, 6–3
1916/1918	Not held (due to World War I)			
1919	Dubbo	(Australia) Joan Scott	(Australia) Miss Elliott	6–3, 7–5
1920	Dubbo	(Australia) Gwen Chiplin	(Australia) Daphne Akhurst	6–4, 6–3
1921	Dubbo	(Australia) Joan Scott (2)	(Australia) M Morgan	8–6, 7–5
1922	Dubbo	(Australia) Gwen Chiplin Utz (2)	(Australia) Nell Lloyd	7–5, 7–5
1923	Dubbo	(Australia) Sylvia Lance	(Australia) Lorna Bull	6–1, 6–4
1924	Dubbo	(Australia) Edith Butcherine	(Australia) Florence Blackhall	6–1, 2–6, 9–7
1925	Dubbo	(Australia) Iris Luckie	(Australia) Ula Valkenburg	6–0, 4–6, 6–0
1926	Dubbo	(Australia) Iris Luckie (2)	(Australia) Pattie Meaney	6–2, 1–6, 6–3
1927	Dubbo	(Australia) Edith Butcherine (2)	(Australia) Pattie Meaney	6–1, 6–3
1928	Dubbo	(Australia) Iris Luckie (3)	(Australia) Gwen Waterhouse	6–2, 6–0
1929	Dubbo	(Australia) Marjorie Cox	(Australia) Joan Pett	2–6, 6–4, 6–4
1930	Dubbo	(Australia) Muriel Wilson	(Australia) Florence B. Walker	6–3, 6–3
1931	Dubbo	(Australia) Muriel Wilson (2)	(Australia) Joan Wheaton	6–2, 7–5
1932	Dubbo	(Australia) Muriel Wilson (3)	(Australia) Nell Hall	9–7, 6–4
1933	Dubbo	(Australia) Joan Wheaton	(Australia) Dot Dingle	6–3, 3–6, 6–1
1934	Dubbo	(Australia) Muriel Wilson (4)	(Australia) Kath Hayes	6–4, 6–2
1935	Dubbo	(Australia) Thelma Coyne	(Australia) Vera Selwin	3–6, 6–2, 7–5
1936	Dubbo	(Australia) Thelma Coyne (2)	(Australia) Muriel Wilson	6-2, 5–7, 6–1
1937	Dubbo	(Australia) Nancye Wynne	(Australia) May Blick	6-4, 6–3
1938	Dubbo	(Australia) Nina Vickery	(Australia) Florence B. Walker	6–4, 6–3
1939	Dubbo	(Australia) Nancye Wynne (2)	(Australia) Joan Hartigan	6–1, 6–0
1940	Dubbo	(Australia) Joan Hartigan	(Australia) Alison Burton	6–4, 6–3
1941/1944	Not held (due to World War II)			
1945	Sydney	(Australia) Mary Bevis	(Australia) Joyce Fitch	6–3, 9–7
1946	Dubbo	(Australia) Mary Bevis (2)	(Australia) Joyce Fitch	6–4, 2–6, 6–4
1947	Dubbo	(Australia) Pat Jones	(Australia) Mary Bevis	2–6, 6–1, 7–5
1948	Dubbo	(Australia) Esme Ashford	(Australia) Joyce Fitch	6–2, 7–5
1949	Dubbo	(Australia) Mary Bevis Hawton (3)	(Australia) Phyllis Finn	6–3, 6–0
1950	Dubbo	(Australia) Beryl Penrose	(Australia) Esme Ashford	6–2, 4–6, 6–2
1951	Dubbo	(Australia) Mary Bevis Hawton (4)	(Australia) Esme Ashford	6–2, 6–3
1952	Dubbo	(Australia) Mary Carter	(Australia) Dorn McGill Fogarty	6–4, 6–1
1953	Dubbo	(Australia) Beryl Penrose	(Australia) Jenny Staley	2–6, 6–4, 6–4
1954	Dubbo	(Australia) Beryl Penrose	(Australia) Gwen Bryant	6–4, 6–2
1955	Armidale	(Australia) Mary Bevis Hawton (5)	(Australia) Beth Jones	6–2, 9–7
1956	Wagga Wagga	(Australia) Beryl Penrose (2)	(Australia) Beth Jones	6–2, 7–5
1957	Dubbo	(Australia) Lorraine Coghlan	(Australia) Beth Jones	6–1, 6–2
1958	Newcastle	(Australia) Jan Lehane	(Australia) Thelma Coyne Long	6–3, 9–7
1959	Goulburn	(Australia) Jan Lehane (2)	(Australia) Betty Holstein	2–6, 6–1, 6–2
1960	Bathurst	(Australia) Lesley Turner	(Australia) Margaret Smith	6–2, 7–5
1961	Grafton	(Australia) Lesley Turner (2)	(Australia) Margaret Smith	6–4, 4–6, 6–4
1962	Young	(Australia) Jan Lehane (3)	(Australia) Lesley Turner	6–1, 5–7, 8–6
1963	Dubbo	(Australia) Jan Lehane (4)	(Australia) Noelene Turner	6–1, 6–1
1964	Tamworth	(Australia) Robyn Ebbern	(Australia) Lesley Turner	6–2, 6–3
1965	Wollongong	(Australia) Lesley Turner (3)	(Australia) Gail Sherriff	6–4, 6–2
1966	Parkes	(Australia) Elizabeth Fenton	(Australia) Karen Krantzcke	6–3, 3–6, 7–5
1967	Gunnedah	(Australia) Elizabeth Fenton (2)	(Australia) Karen Krantzcke	8–6, 4–6, 6–2
1968	Wollongong	(Australia) Elizabeth Fenton (3)	(Australia) Evonne Goolagong	4–6, 6–4, 7–5
↓ Open era ↓
1969	Cowra	(Australia) Evonne Goolagong	(Australia) Wendy Gilchrist	6–4, 6–2
1970	Newcastle	(Australia) Evonne Goolagong (2)	(Australia) Karen Krantzcke	6–1, 5–7, 6–3
1971	Goulburn	(Australia) Evonne Goolagong (3)	(United States) Patti Hogan	6–1, 6–4
1972	Grenfell	(Australia) Evonne Goolagong (4)	(Australia) Jan Lehane O'Neill	6–1, 6–2
↓ ILTF Independent Tour ↓
1973	Gloucester	(Australia) Evonne Goolagong (5)	(Australia) Dianne Fromholtz	6–2, 6–0
1974	Quirindi	(Australia) Evonne Goolagong (6)	(Australia) Chris O'Neil	4–6, 6–1, 6–1
1975	Cootamundra	(Australia) Jan Lehane O'Neill (5)	(Australia) Jenny Walker	6–4, 6–2
1976	Grafton	(Australia) Chris O'Neill	(Australia) Jan Lehane O'Neill	7–5, 1–6, 6–3
1977	Orange	(United States) Donna Stockton	(Australia) Amanda Tobin-Dingwall	3–6, 7–5, 7–5
1978	Wagga Wagga	(Australia) Kaye Hallam	(Australia) Keryn Pratt	7–6, 6–3
1979	Tamworth	(Australia) Kaye Hallam (2)	(Australia) Pat Coleman	6–3, 6–3
1980	Orange	(Australia) Amanda Tobin	(Australia) Debbie Freeman	6–2, 6–3
1981	Wagga Wagga	(Australia) Karen Gulley	(Australia) Linda Cassell	6–4, 6–1
1982	Grafton	(Australia) Sharon Hodgkin	(Australia) Amanda Tobin	6–4, 7–5
1983	Wollongong	(Australia) Janine Thompson	(Australia) Rebecca Bryant	6–3, 7–6
1984	Dubbo	(Australia) Janine Thompson (2)	(Australia) Louise Field	6–4, 6–3
↓ Tennis Australia Circuit ↓
1987	Sydney	(Australia) Michelle Jaggard	(Australia) Colleen Carney	6–3, 6–3
1988	Newcastle	(Australia) Sally McCann	(Australia) Kristine Radford	3–6, 6–2, 6–0

== Tournament statistics ==
=== Men's singles ===
- Most titles: (Australia) Jack Crawford (5)
- Most finals: (Australia) Jack Crawford (6)
- Most consecutive titles: (Australia) Vivian McGrath & (Australia) Jack Crawford & (South Africa) Bob Hewitt & (Australia) Tony Roche & (Australia) Colin Dibley & (Australia) Kim Warwick (2)
- Most consecutive finals: (Australia) Tony Roche (3)

=== Women's singles ===
- Most titles: (Australia) Evonne Goolagong (6)
- Most finals: (Australia) Evonne Goolagong (7)
- Most consecutive titles: (Australia) Evonne Goolagong (5)
- Most consecutive finals: (Australia) Evonne Goolagong (7)
