= 1925 Australasian Championships – Mixed doubles =

Mixed doubles
- 1925 Australasian Championships

Final
- Champions: (Australia) Daphne Akhurst (Australia) Jim Willard
- Runners-up: (Australia) Sylvia Harper (Australia) Bob Schlesinger
- Score: 6–4, 6–4

Details
- Draw: 17
- Seeds: 4

Events
Singles	men	women		boys	girls
Doubles	men	women	mixed	boys	girls
- Australasian Championships

The first-seeds Daphne Akhurst and Jim Willard successfully defended their title by defeating the second seeded Sylvia Harper and Bob Schlesinger 6–4, 6–4 in the final, to win the mixed doubles tennis title at the 1925 Australasian Championships.

== Seeds ==
1. (Australia) Daphne Akhurst / (Australia) Jim Willard (champions)
2. (Australia) Sylvia Harper / (Australia) Bob Schlesinger (final)
3. (Australia) Esna Boyd / (Australia) Gar Hone (semifinals)
4. (Australia) Kathleen Le Messurier / (Australia) Les Baker (semifinals)

== Draw ==
Key

- Q = Qualifier
- WC = Wild card
- LL = Lucky loser
- Alt = Alternate
- ITF = ITF entry
- PR = Protected ranking
- SR = Special ranking
- SE = Special exempt
- JE = Junior exempt
- JR = Junior Accelerator Programme entrant
- CO = College Accelerator Programme entrant
- NG = Next Gen Accelerator Program entrant
- w/o = Walkover
- r = Retired
- d = Defaulted

=== Finals ===
Quarterfinals
1	(Australia) Daphne Akhurst (Australia) Jim Willard	8	7
(Australia) Pattie Meaney (Australia) Aubrey Willard	6	5
(Australia) Louie Bickerton (Australia) Frank Peach	2	4
3	(Australia) Esna Boyd (Australia) Gar Hone	6	6
4	(Australia) Kathleen Le Messurier (Australia) Les Baker	6	6
(Australia) Flora Cameron (Australia) George Crouch	3	3
(Australia) Marjorie Cox (Australia) Rupert Wertheim	1	4
2	(Australia) Sylvia Harper (Australia) Bob Schlesinger	6	6

Semifinals
1	(Australia) Daphne Akhurst (Australia) Jim Willard	6	3	6
3	(Australia) Esna Boyd (Australia) Gar Hone	3	6	2
4	(Australia) Kathleen Le Messurier (Australia) Les Baker	4	3
2	(Australia) Sylvia Harper (Australia) Bob Schlesinger	6	6

Final
1	(Australia) Daphne Akhurst (Australia) Jim Willard	6	6
2	(Australia) Sylvia Harper (Australia) Bob Schlesinger	4	4

=== Earlier rounds ===
==== Section 1 ====
First round
(Australia) Grace Paterson (Australia) M. Henry Marsh	7	7
(Australia) Iris Woodd (Australia) Guy Williams	5	5

Second round
1	(Australia) Daphne Akhurst (Australia) Jim Willard	8	6
(Australia) Phyllis Lester (Australia) Norman McDougall	6	3
(Australia) Pattie Meaney (Australia) Aubrey Willard	6	6
(Australia) Ula Valkenburg (Australia) Dick Medcalf	4	2
(Australia) Louie Bickerton (Australia) Frank Peach	7	6
(Australia) Grace Paterson (Australia) M. Henry Marsh	5	3
3	(Australia) Esna Boyd (Australia) Gar Hone	6	6
(Australia) Rhona White (Australia) Frank Blaxland	4	1

Quarterfinals
1	(Australia) Daphne Akhurst (Australia) Jim Willard	8	7
(Australia) Pattie Meaney (Australia) Aubrey Willard	6	5
(Australia) Louie Bickerton (Australia) Frank Peach	2	4
3	(Australia) Esna Boyd (Australia) Gar Hone	6	6

Semifinals
1	(Australia) Daphne Akhurst (Australia) Jim Willard	6	3	6
3	(Australia) Esna Boyd (Australia) Gar Hone	3	6	2

==== Section 2 ====
First round

Second round
4	(Australia) Kathleen Le Messurier (Australia) Les Baker	6	12
(Australia) Muff Wilson (Australia) Bob Spencer	1	10
(Australia) Flora Cameron (Australia) George Crouch	6	6
(Australia) Dorothy Weston (Australia) Morris Smith	3	3
(Australia) Marjorie Cox (Australia) Rupert Wertheim	6	4	6
(Australia) Minnie Richardson (Australia) Robert Berriman	2	6	2
2	(Australia) Sylvia Harper (Australia) Bob Schlesinger	6	6
(Australia) Floris St. George (Australia) Fred Kalms	2	4

Quarterfinals
4	(Australia) Kathleen Le Messurier (Australia) Les Baker	6	6
(Australia) Flora Cameron (Australia) George Crouch	3	3
(Australia) Marjorie Cox (Australia) Rupert Wertheim	1	4
2	(Australia) Sylvia Harper (Australia) Bob Schlesinger	6	6

Semifinals
4	(Australia) Kathleen Le Messurier (Australia) Les Baker	4	3
2	(Australia) Sylvia Harper (Australia) Bob Schlesinger	6	6
