= Oxenham =

Oxenham is a surname derived from a location of the same name in the Devon village of South Tawton. Notable people with the surname include:

- Elsie J. Oxenham (1880–1960), British author
- Henry Nutcombe Oxenham (1829–1888), British church historian
- John Oxenham (d. 1580), Elizabethan sea captain and first English person to sail in the Pacific Ocean.
- "John Oxenham", pen name of William Arthur Dunkerley (1852 –1941), British poet and journalist
- Justinian Oxenham (1860–1932), Australian public servant
- Lee Oxenham, American politician
- Lionel Oxenham (1888–1970), Australian cricketer
- Logan Oxenham, Canadian politician who was elected as MLA for Kirkfield Park in the 2023 Manitoba general election
- Ron Oxenham (1891–1939), Australian cricketer
- Sofia Oxenham (born 1998), British actress
- William Oxenham (1823–1875), British soldier and Victoria Cross recipient
