= Cecil Stuart =

Australian tennis player (1900–1954)

- Full name: Cecil Stuart
- Country (sports): Australia
- Born: April 1900 Adelaide, South Australia, Australia
- Died: 23 November 1954 (aged 54) Melbourne, Victoria, Australia
- Turned pro: 1920 (amateur tour)
- Retired: 1942

Singles

Grand Slam singles results
- Australian Open: QF (1924)

Cecil Stuart (1900–1954) was an Australian tennis player. In the late 1930s he also played squash. Stuart was originally from South Australia but later moved to Victoria. He made his debut in the Australasian championships in 1920 and lost in round one to Horace Rice. At the Australasian championships in 1924, Stuart beat Ronald Thomas in the third round. The concluding stages of the match were "tame and spiritless, both contestants hitting softly and cautiously", according to The Advertiser. Stuart lost in the quarter-finals to James Anderson. Stuart then turned professional, but was later reinstated as an amateur. Stuart won the men's singles, men's doubles and mixed doubles events at the Victorian Country week tournament at Kooyong in 1940, just before turning 40 years of age.
