= 1924 Australasian Championships – Men's singles =

Men's singles
- 1924 Australasian Championships

Final
- Champion: (Australia) James Anderson
- Runner-up: (Australia) Bob Schlesinger
- Score: 6–3, 6–4, 3–6, 5–7, 6–3

Details
- Draw: 40
- Seeds: 8

Events
Singles	men	women		boys	girls
Doubles	men	women	mixed	boys	girls
- Australasian Championships

James Anderson defeated Bob Schlesinger 6–3, 6–4, 3–6, 5–7, 6–3 in the final to win the men's singles tennis title at the 1924 Australasian Championships.

== Seeds ==
The seeded players are listed below. James Anderson is the champion; others show the round in which they were eliminated.

1. (Australia) James Anderson (champion)
2. (Australia) Gerald Patterson (second round)
3. (Australia) Pat O'Hara Wood (third round)
4. (Australia) Bob Schlesinger (finalist)
5. (Australia) Ronald Thomas (third round)
6. (Australia) Gar Hone (semifinals)
7. (Australia) Jim Willard (third round)
8. (Australia) Rupert Wertheim (quarterfinals)

== Draw ==
=== Key ===
- Q = Qualifier
- WC = Wild card
- LL = Lucky loser
- r = Retired

Quarterfinals
1	(Australia) James Anderson	8	6	6
(Australia) Cecil Stuart	6	1	2
6	(Australia) Gar Hone	7	6	6
(Australia) Gordon Dickinson	5	0	4
4	(Australia) Bob Schlesinger	5	6	6	9
(Australia) Ian McInnes	7	3	3	7
(Australia) Fred Kalms	5	5	6	6	8
8	(Australia) Rupert Wertheim	7	7	1	1	6

Semifinals
1	(Australia) James Anderson	6	6	6
6	(Australia) Gar Hone	2	3	2
4	(Australia) Bob Schlesinger	7	8	6
(Australia) Fred Kalms	5	6	0

Finals
1	(Australia) James Anderson	6	6	3	5	6
4	(Australia) Bob Schlesinger	3	4	6	7	3

=== Earlier rounds ===
==== Section 1 ====
First round

Second round
1	(Australia) Anderson	6	6	6
(Australia) Newton	3	0	3
(Australia) Roberts	6	8	6
(Australia) Cryle	3	6	3
5	(Australia) Thomas	6	7	6
(Australia) Wallace	3	5	1
(Australia) Stuart	6	6	6
(Australia) Marsh	2	3	4

Third round
1	(Australia) Anderson	6	6	6
(Australia) Roberts	1	1	4
5	(Australia) Thomas	6	6	4	3	3
(Australia) Stuart	4	4	6	6	6

Quarterfinals
1	(Australia) Anderson	8	6	6
(Australia) Stuart	6	1	2

==== Section 2 ====
First round
6	(Australia) Hone	6	6	6
(Australia) Clemenger	3	3	1
(Australia) Ladyman	1	6	6	8	6
(Australia) Moran	6	1	8	6	4
(Australia) Drews	9	4	6	6
(Australia) Addison	7	6	3	4
(Australia) Robinson	6	6	6
(Australia) Henty	4	3	4

Second round
6	(Australia) Hone	6	6	6
(Australia) Ladyman	2	1	0
(Australia) Drews	6	6	11	6
(Australia) Robinson	3	4	13	4
3	(Australia) O' Hara Wood	6	3	6	6
(Australia) Buckley	2	6	3	0
(Australia) Dickinson	6	6	6
(Australia) Cleland	3	2	3

Third round
6	(Australia) Hone	6	6	6
(Australia) Drews	2	3	2
3	(Australia) O'Hara Wood
(Australia) Dickinson	w/o

Quarterfinals
6	(Australia) Hone	7	6	6
(Australia) Dickinson	5	0	4

==== Section 3 ====
First round
7	(Australia) J. Willard	6	6	6
(Australia) Hallowes	1	1	1
(Australia) Crebbin	6	6	7
(Australia) N. Heath	2	1	5
(Australia) McInnes	6	6	2	6
(Australia) Ratten	2	4	6	1
2	(Australia) Patterson	6	17	6
(Australia) Finlayson	4	15	4

Second round
4	(Australia) Schlesinger	6	4	4	7	6
(Australia) Fitchett	3	6	6	5	4
(Australia) Rainey	6	6	6
(Australia) Bulcock	1	3	2
7	(Australia) J. Willard	6	3	6	6	6
(Australia) Crebbin	8	6	3	2	2
(Australia) McInnes	3	6	6	3	6
2	(Australia) Patterson	6	2	3	6	4

Third round
4	(Australia) Schlesinger	6	6	6
(Australia) Rainey	4	0	3
7	(Australia) J. Willard	1	3	4
(Australia) McInnes	6	6	6

Quarterfinals
4	(Australia) Schlesinger	5	6	6	9
(Australia) McInnes	7	3	3	7

==== Section 4 ====
First round

Second round
(Australia) Kalms	6	6	3	6
(Australia) Noske	2	3	6	2
(Australia) Treloar	6	4	6	7
(Australia) Smith	1	6	1	5
(Australia) Fitts	9	6	2	6
(Australia) Phillips	7	2	6	3
8	(Australia) Wertheim	6	6	6
(Australia) Strange	1	3	2

Third round
(Australia) Kalms	6	6	8
(Australia) Treloar	1	4	6
(Australia) Fitts	2	5	1
8	(Australia) Wertheim	6	7	6

Quarterfinals
(Australia) Kalms	5	5	6	6	8
8	(Australia) Wertheim	7	7	1	1	6

== See also ==
- 1924 Australasian Championships – Women's singles

Preceded by 1923 U.S. National Championships	Grand Slam men's singles	Succeeded by 1924 Wimbledon Championships
