= Gordon Dickinson =

Australian tennis player

- Full name: Gordon William Rivers Dickinson
- Country (sports): Australia
- Born: 29 November 1901 Melbourne, Victoria, Australia
- Died: 28 February 1991 (aged 89) Melbourne, Victoria, Australia
- Turned pro: 1922 (amateur tour)
- Retired: 1931

Singles

Grand Slam singles results
- Australian Open: QF (1924)

Doubles

Grand Slam doubles results
- Australian Open: 2R (1924)

Gordon Dickinson (1901–1991) was an Australian tennis player. While at school he showed promise at cricket and was a versatile left handed tennis player. Dickinson won the Burnie men's singles event in 1923 and 1924. Dickinson first entered the Australasian championships in 1924, when he lost in the quarter-finals to Garton Hone. In 1927, Dickinson lost in round two of the Australian championships to Gordon Lum. In 1927 Dickinson sustained an eye injury from a piece of wood, an injury that required surgical treatment.
