= 1925 Australasian Championships – Women's doubles =

Women's doubles
- 1925 Australasian Championships

Final
- Champions: (Australia) Daphne Akhurst (Australia) Sylvia Harper
- Runners-up: (Australia) Esna Boyd (Australia) Kathleen Le Messurier
- Score: 6–4, 6–3

Details
- Draw: 18
- Seeds: 4

Events
| Singles | men | women | | boys | girls |
| Doubles | men | women | mixed | boys | girls |
- Australasian Championships

Defending champions Daphne Akhurst and Sylvia Harper defeated Esna Boyd and Kathleen Le Messurier 6–4, 6–3 in the final, to win the women's doubles tennis title at the 1925 Australasian Championships.

With this win Akhurst completed her first Triple Crown achievement, having already won the singles and the mixed doubles titles earlier that day.

== Seeds ==
1. (Australia) Daphne Akhurst / (Australia) Sylvia Harper (champions)
2. (Australia) Esna Boyd / (Australia) Kathleen Le Messurier (final)
3. (Australia) Marjorie Cox / (Australia) Floris St. George (semifinals)
4. (Australia) Pattie Meaney / (Australia) Millie Mitchell (semifinals)

== Draw ==
Key

- Q = Qualifier
- WC = Wild card
- LL = Lucky loser
- Alt = Alternate
- ITF = ITF entry
- PR = Protected ranking
- SR = Special ranking
- SE = Special exempt
- JE = Junior exempt
- JR = Junior Accelerator Programme entrant
- CO = College Accelerator Programme entrant
- NG = Next Gen Accelerator Program entrant
- w/o = Walkover
- r = Retired
- d = Defaulted

=== Finals ===
Quarterfinals
2 | (Australia) Esna Boyd (Australia) Kathleen Le Messurier | 6 | 6
(Australia) Miss Holt (Australia) Mrs. F. Harper | 3 | 2
4 | (Australia) Pattie Meaney (Australia) Millie Mitchell | 6 | 6
(Australia) Mrs. Docker (Australia) Jessie Watson | 4 | 2
1 | (Australia) Daphne Akhurst (Australia) Sylvia Harper | 6 | 6
(Australia) Edie Butcherine (Australia) Dorothy Weston | 2 | 1
3 | (Australia) Marjorie Cox (Australia) Floris St. George | 6 | 6
(Australia) Louie Bickerton (Australia) Grace Paterson | 4 | 4

Semifinals
2 | (Australia) Esna Boyd (Australia) Kathleen Le Messurier | 6 | 8
4 | (Australia) Pattie Meaney (Australia) Millie Mitchell | 4 | 6
1 | (Australia) Daphne Akhurst (Australia) Sylvia Harper | 7 | 6
3 | (Australia) Marjorie Cox (Australia) Floris St. George | 5 | 3

Final
2 | (Australia) Esna Boyd (Australia) Kathleen Le Messurier | 4 | 3
1 | (Australia) Daphne Akhurst (Australia) Sylvia Harper | 6 | 6

=== Earlier rounds ===
==== Section 1 ====
First round
(Australia) Muff Wilson (Australia) Iris Woodd | 6 | 6 | 6
(Australia) Doris Mackie (Australia) Ula Valkenburg | 2 | 8 | 4
(Australia) Mrs. Docker (Australia) Jessie Watson | 6 | 6
(Australia) Mary Cooling (Australia) Mrs. G. B. Stevens | 2 | 2

Second round
2 | (Australia) Esna Boyd (Australia) Kathleen Le Messurier | 6 | 6
(Australia) Minnie Goodman (Australia) Nion Kenyon | 3 | 4
(Australia) Miss Holt (Australia) Mrs. F. Harper | w/o
(Australia) Coral Buttsworth (Australia) Miss O'Connor
4 | (Australia) Pattie Meaney (Australia) Millie Mitchell | 7 | 7 | 6
(Australia) Flora Cameron (Australia) Nancy Fitzhardinge | 5 | 9 | 3
(Australia) Muff Wilson (Australia) Iris Woodd | 3 | 7
(Australia) Mrs. Docker (Australia) Jessie Watson | 6 | 9

Quarterfinals
2 | (Australia) Esna Boyd (Australia) Kathleen Le Messurier | 6 | 6
(Australia) Miss Holt (Australia) Mrs. F. Harper | 3 | 2
4 | (Australia) Pattie Meaney (Australia) Millie Mitchell | 6 | 6
(Australia) Mrs. Docker (Australia) Jessie Watson | 4 | 2

Semifinals
2 | (Australia) Esna Boyd (Australia) Kathleen Le Messurier | 6 | 8
4 | (Australia) Pattie Meaney (Australia) Millie Mitchell | 4 | 6

==== Section 2 ====
First round
(Australia) Anna Doyle (Australia) Phyllis Lester | 6 | 6
(Australia) Mrs. Evans (Australia) Margaret Knoblanche | 2 | 4

Second round
1 | (Australia) Daphne Akhurst (Australia) Sylvia Harper | 6 | 6
(Australia) Anna Doyle (Australia) Phyllis Lester | 4 | 1
3 | (Australia) Marjorie Cox (Australia) Floris St. George | 6 | 6
(Australia) Minnie Richardson (Australia) Adeline Wilkins | 3 | 1
(Australia) Louie Bickerton (Australia) Grace Paterson | 6 | 9
(Australia) Gwen Waterhouse (Australia) Rhona White | 2 | 7

Quarterfinals
1 | (Australia) Daphne Akhurst (Australia) Sylvia Harper | 6 | 6
(Australia) Edie Butcherine ^{[a]} (Australia) Dorothy Weston ^{[a]} | 2 | 1
3 | (Australia) Marjorie Cox (Australia) Floris St. George | 6 | 6
(Australia) Louie Bickerton (Australia) Grace Paterson | 4 | 4

Semifinals
1 | (Australia) Daphne Akhurst (Australia) Sylvia Harper | 7 | 6
3 | (Australia) Marjorie Cox (Australia) Floris St. George | 5 | 3

== Notes ==
- ^{a} Even the day before, this encounter was being announced as Akhurst and Harper vs. Weston and partner – so, logically, it had to be the first match of the tournament for Butcherine/Weston pair.
