= 1925 Australasian Championships – Women's singles =

Women's singles
- 1925 Australasian Championships

Final
- Champion: (Australia) Daphne Akhurst
- Runner-up: (Australia) Esna Boyd
- Score: 1–6, 8–6, 6–4

Details
- Draw: 26
- Seeds: 6

Events
Singles	men	women		boys	girls
Doubles	men	women	mixed	boys	girls
- Australasian Championships

Daphne Akhurst defeated Esna Boyd 1–6, 8–6, 6–4, in the final to win the women's singles tennis title at the 1925 Australasian Championships.

== Seeds ==
The seeded players are listed below. Daphne Akhurst is the champion; others show the round in which they were eliminated.

1. (Australia) Sylvia Harper (semifinals)
2. (Australia) Daphne Akhurst (champion)
3. (Australia) Esna Boyd (finalist)
4. (Australia) Kathleen Le Messurier (first round)
5. (Australia) Marjorie Cox (quarterfinals)
6. (Australia) Minnie Richardson (semifinals)

== Draw ==
=== Key ===
- Q = Qualifier
- WC = Wild card
- LL = Lucky loser
- r = Retired

=== Finals ===
Quarterfinals
6	(Australia) Minnie Richardson	6	1	6
(Australia) Pattie Meaney	4	6	2
(Australia) Jessie Watson	1	4
2	(Australia) Daphne Akhurst	6	6
5	(Australia) Marjorie Cox	6	0	7
3	(Australia) Esna Boyd	4	6	9
(Australia) Margaret Knoblanche	1	1
1	(Australia) Sylvia Harper	6	6

Semifinals
6	(Australia) Minnie Richardson	1	2
2	(Australia) Daphne Akhurst	6	6
3	(Australia) Esna Boyd	6	6
1	(Australia) Sylvia Harper	2	3

Finals
2	(Australia) Daphne Akhurst	1	8	6
3	(Australia) Esna Boyd	6	6	4

=== Earlier rounds ===
==== Section 1 ====
First round
(Australia) Meaney	4	6	9
4	(Australia) Le Messurier	6	4	7
(Australia) Mackie	w/o
(Australia) Buttsworth
(Australia) Bickerton	7	6
(Australia) Mrs. M. Grant	5	0
(Australia) Watson	9	7
(Australia) Paterson	7	5
(Australia) Wilson	6	5	6
(Australia) Wilkins	2	7	4

Second round
6	(Australia) Richardson	6	8
(Australia) Mrs. G. B. Stevens	4	6
(Australia) Meaney	6	6
(Australia) Mackie	0	4
(Australia) Bickerton	4	7	3
(Australia) Watson	6	5	6
(Australia) Wilson	4	6	2
2	(Australia) Akhurst	6	4	6

Quarterfinals
6	(Australia) Richardson	6	1	6
(Australia) Meaney	4	6	2
(Australia) Watson	1	4
2	(Australia) Akhurst	6	6

Semifinals
6	(Australia) Richardson	1	2
2	(Australia) Akhurst	6	6

==== Section 2 ====
First round
5	(Australia) M. Cox	6	6
(Australia) Valkenburg	2	0
(Australia) Cameron	6	6
(Australia) Smith	2	4
(Australia) Weston	6	6
(Australia) White	1	2
3	(Australia) Boyd	6	6
(Australia) St. George	2	0
(Australia) Knoblanche	w/o
(Australia) E. Cox

Second round
5	(Australia) M. Cox	6	6	6
(Australia) Cameron	3	8	2
(Australia) Weston	1	3
3	(Australia) Boyd	6	6
(Australia) Knoblanche	6	6
(Australia) Freudenstein	2	4
(Australia) Woodd	1	1
1	(Australia) Harper	6	6

Quarterfinals
5	(Australia) M. Cox	6	0	7
3	(Australia) Boyd	4	6	9
(Australia) Knoblanche	1	1
1	(Australia) Harper	6	6

Semifinals
3	(Australia) Boyd	6	6
1	(Australia) Harper	2	3

Preceded by 1924 U.S. National Championships – Women's singles	Grand Slam women's singles	Succeeded by 1925 French Championships – Women's singles
