= 1925 Australasian Championships =

- Date: 24–30 January 1925
- Edition: 18th
- Category: Grand Slam (ITF)
- Surface: Grass
- Location: Sydney, Australia
- Venue: White City Tennis Club

Champions

Men's singles
- (Australia) James Anderson

Women's singles
- (Australia) Daphne Akhurst

Men's doubles
- (Australia) Pat O'Hara Wood / (Australia) Gerald Patterson

Women's doubles
- (Australia) Daphne Akhurst / (Australia) Sylvia Harper

Mixed doubles
- (Australia) Daphne Akhurst / (Australia) Jim Willard

Boys' singles
- (Australia) Alan Coldham

Boys' doubles
- (Australia) Jack Crawford / (Australia) Harry Hopman
- Australasian Championships

The 1925 Australasian Championships was a tennis tournament that took place on outdoor Grass courts at the White City Tennis Club, Sydney, Australia, from 24 January to 31 January. It was the 18th edition of the Australian Championships (now known as the Australian Open), the 4th held in Sydney, and the first Grand Slam tournament of the year. The singles titles were won by Australians James Anderson and Daphne Akhurst.

== Finals ==
=== Men's singles ===
(Australia) James Anderson defeated (Australia) Gerald Patterson 11–9, 2–6, 6–2, 6–3

=== Women's singles ===
(Australia) Daphne Akhurst defeated (Australia) Esna Boyd 1–6, 8–6, 6–4

=== Men's doubles ===
(Australia) Pat O'Hara Wood / (Australia) Gerald Patterson defeated (Australia) James Anderson / (Australia) Fred Kalms 6–4, 9–7, 7–5

=== Women's doubles ===
(Australia) Daphne Akhurst / (Australia) Sylvia Harper defeated (Australia) Esna Boyd / (Australia) Kathleen Le Messurier 6–4, 6–3

=== Mixed doubles ===
(Australia) Daphne Akhurst / (Australia) Jim Willard defeated (Australia) Sylvia Harper / (Australia) Bob Schlesinger 6–4, 6–4

Preceded by 1924 U.S. National Championships	Grand Slams	Succeeded by 1925 French Championships
