= Norman Peach =

Australian tennis player

- Full name: Alfred Norman Peach
- Country (sports): Australia
- Born: 29 March 1889 Wellington, New Zealand
- Died: 12 August 1974 (aged 85) Sydney, New South Wales, Australia
- Turned pro: 1909 (amateur tour)
- Retired: 1935

Grand Slam singles results
- Australian Open: SF (1922)
- US Open: 1R (1921)

Grand Slam doubles results
- Australian Open: F (1922)

Grand Slam mixed doubles results
- Australian Open: QF (1928, 1930, 1934)

Norman Peach (1889–1974) was an Australian tennis player. He was born in New Zealand and his family moved to Australia when he was a boy. Peach's best stroke was a flat forehand drive and he always fought hard to win when close to defeat. Peach captained Australasia in Davis Cup in 1921 and won the New South Wales State Championships in 1925. Peach first entered the Australasian Championships in 1919 aged 30 and lost in the third round to Alfred Beamish. In 1921, Peach lost in the opening round of the U. S. Championships to William Ingraham. At the 1922 Australasian Championships, Peach beat Edward Jordan, Rupert Wertheim and Jack Clemenger before losing in the semi-finals to James Anderson. At the 1925 Australasian Championships, Peach lost in the quarter-finals to Richard Schlesinger. In the 1926 Australasian Championships, Peach beat Harry Hopman before losing in the quarters to Schlesinger. In the 1928 Australian championships, Peach lost in round three to Gerald Patterson. In 1930 he lost in round two to Schlesinger. In 1931 he lost in round two to Clifford Sproule.

== Grand Slam finals ==
=== Doubles (1 runner-up) ===
Result	Year	Championship	Surface	Partner	Opponents	Score
Loss	1922	Australasian Championships	Grass	(Australia) James Anderson	(Australia) Jack Hawkes (Australia) Gerald Patterson	10–8, 0–6, 0–6, 5–7
