= Lionel Oxenham =

Australian cricketer

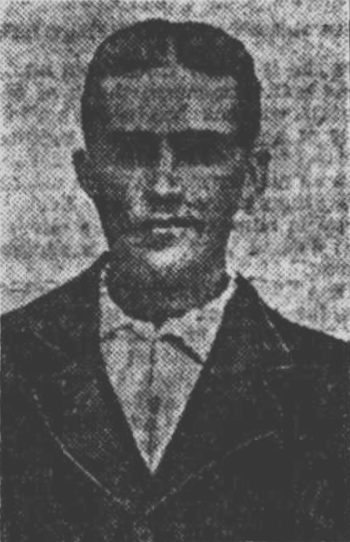

Personal information
- Born: 27 January 1888; Brisbane, Queensland, Australia
- Died: 10 January 1970 (aged 81); Clayfield, Queensland, Australia
- Source: Cricinfo, 6 October 2020

Lionel Oxenham (27 January 1888 – 10 January 1970) was an Australian cricketer. He played in twenty-three first-class matches for Queensland between 1919 and 1928.

== See also ==
- List of Queensland first-class cricketers
