= Rupert Wertheim =

Australian tennis player (1893–1933)

- Full name: Rupert Carl Wertheim
- Country (sports): Australia
- Born: 22 December 1893 Melbourne
- Died: 12 October 1933 (aged 39) East Melbourne, Victoria
- Plays: Right-handed

Grand Slam singles results
- Australian Open: SF (1914)
- Wimbledon: 2R (1922)
- US Open: 1R (1922)

Grand Slam doubles results
- Australian Open: SF (1925, 1926, 1928, 1929)
- Wimbledon: QF (1922)

Rupert Carl Wertheim (22 December 1893 – 12 October 1933) was an Australian tennis player.

Towering at 6 feet 6 inches, Wertheim was known for his strong wrists and vigorous play.

== Biography ==
Wertheim was born on 22 December 1893, in Melbourne Victoria, the second son of Hugo Wertheim and Sophie Emilie. His parents were both emigrants from Germany, who settled in Melbourne in the 1880s. He had four siblings, two brothers and two sisters. One of his sisters is the grandmother of former Victorian premier Jeff Kennett. The business which his father founded, Wertheim Pianos, was highly successful and made the family a well known name in Australia. It is said that Nellie Melba would request to use Wertheim pianos for her performances.

From 1901 to 1910, Wertheim attended Melbourne Church of England Grammar School before following his older brother into Trinity College, one of the residential colleges of the University of Melbourne, in March 1911. Following his studies, he worked for a period of time in the family business.

An interstate tennis player for Victoria, Wertheim first competed in the Australasian Championships in 1911, as a 17-year-old. At the 1914 Australasian Championships he reached the semi-finals in the singles competition, which remained his best performance. His loss in the semi-finals was to eventual champion Arthur O'Hara Wood, a fellow alumnus from his residential college, in four sets.

Due to his German heritage, Wertheim was nicknamed "Sos" or "Soss", for sausage. He later served in Germany as a member of the Australian Imperial Force during World War I. After enlisting in 1915, Wertheim went to Gallipoli with the 23rd Battalion but only saw the final month of the campaign. He transferred after that to the 2nd Pioneer Battalion in March 1916 and fought in Pozières from July to August and then in Flers. In 1917 he was seconded to the Intelligence Corps and is credited with obtaining vital information from a German prisoner to avert a planned counter-attack. He was mentioned in despatches three times during the war, included those of Douglas Haig, for his interrogation of the German prisoner. In 1919 he returned to Australia.

He continued his tennis career in the 1920s and was a regular competitor at the Australasian Championships. Although he wasn't able to reach the final four again he was a doubles semi-finalist on four occasions, with Timothy Fitchett in 1924, Garton Hone in 1925 and Richard Schlesinger in both 1926 and 1929.

The 1922 season saw Wertheim called up to the Australian team for the International Lawn Tennis Challenge (Davis Cup) and he played in a quarter-final tie against Czechoslovakia in London. He featured in the doubles, with Gerald Patterson, which they won in straight sets, over Karel Ardelt and Friedrich Rohrer. It was the only rubber he would ever play and he later would jocularly declare that he was one of the few players to be unbeaten in the Davis Cup. While in England he competed at Wimbledon and was runner-up in the All England Plate, after a second round exit in the main draw. He then travelled with the Davis Cup team to America and although he wasn't required for the Davis Cup ties did appear at the U.S. National Championships.

One of his finest wins came when he defeated Patterson, then a two-time Wimbledon winner, at the 1925 Victorian Championships.

A stock broker, he co-founded a brokerage business called Williams & Wertheim in Collins Street.

Illness ended his tennis career in 1929 and for two years he remained bedridden as a result. He recovered well enough to return to work but on 12 October 1933 died at a hospital in East Melbourne after collapsing in the city. His funeral was held at Brighton Cemetery. He was married to Marjorie Felstead, the younger sister of the golfer Claude Felstead. They had with three sons.

== See also ==
- List of Australia Davis Cup team representatives
