= Garton Hone =

Australian tennis player

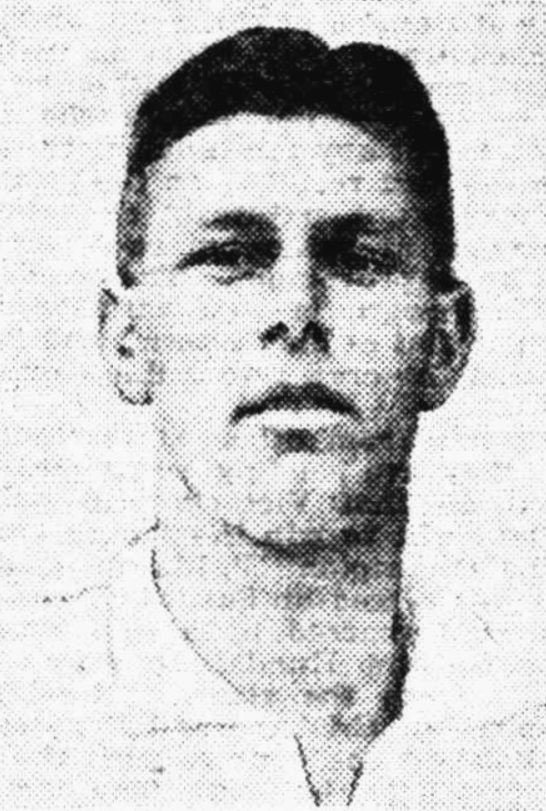
- Full name: Garton Maxwell Hone
- Country (sports): Australia
- Born: 21 February 1901; Morphett Vale, South Australia
- Died: 28 May 1991 (aged 90); Myrtle Bank, South Australia

Singles

Grand Slam singles results
- Australian Open: SF (1924)
- Wimbledon: 1R (1939)

Doubles

Grand Slam doubles results
- Australian Open: SF (1925)
- Wimbledon: 1R (1939)

Mixed doubles

Grand Slam mixed doubles results
- Australian Open: F (1924)
- Wimbledon: 3R (1939)

Garton Maxwell "Gar" Hone (21 February 1901 – 28 May 1991) was an Australian medical practitioner noted as a tennis player of the 1920s and 1930s who also played first-class cricket for South Australia.

== Career ==
Born in Morphett Vale, South Australia, which was then a rural area, he was the son of Dr. Frank Sandland Hone and Lucy Hone, née Henderson. He excelled at various sports while growing up and earned Half Blues in tennis, Australian rules football and cricket at the University of Adelaide. While at University, Hone played his only first-class cricket match, for South Australia against Victoria in the 1919/20 Shield season. A right-handed top order batsman, Hone made two and eighteen, being dismissed leg before wicket by Warwick Armstrong. Hone bowled two expensive overs of leg spin, going for 21 runs.

In football, Hone played as a ruckman and was originally chosen in the Adelaide University Football Club side to play Melbourne University Football Club in August 1919 but withdrew prior to the match.

Hone first appeared at the Australasian Championships in 1920, where he lost in the opening round to. E. Rowe. In 1924 he was defeated by eventual champion James Anderson in the semifinals. In 1925 he beat Gar Moon before losing in the quarters to Anderson. In 1926 Hone lost in the quarters to Jack Hawkes. In 1927 he lost in the second round to Richard Schlesinger. In 1929 he lost in the second round to Harry Hopman. In 1932 he lost in the second round to Jack Crawford. In 1934 he lost in round one to Pat Hughes. In 1924 Hone reached the mixed doubles final, with Esna Boyd. They lost the decider in straight sets to the pairing of Daphne Akhurst and James Willard. In 1925 he had his best ever showing in the men's doubles, with a semi final appearance, after teaming up with Rupert Wertheim.

== Grand Slam finals ==
=== Mixed doubles: (1 runner-up) ===
Result	Year	Championship	Surface	Partner	Opponents	Score
Loss	1924	Australian Championships	Grass	(Australia) Esna Boyd	(Australia) Daphne Akhurst (Australia) Jim Willard	3–6, 4–6
