= Frederick Kalms =

Australian tennis player

- Full name: Frederick Ernst Walter Kalms
- Country (sports): Australia
- Born: 1897 Jindera, New South Wales, Australia
- Died: 23 October 1977 (aged 80) Canowindra, New South Wales, Australia
- Turned pro: 1922 (amateur tour)
- Retired: 1940

Singles

Grand Slam singles results
- Australian Open: SF (1924)
- US Open: 2R (1924)

Doubles

Grand Slam doubles results
- Australian Open: F (1925)

Mixed doubles

Grand Slam mixed doubles results
- Australian Open: QF (1928)

Frederick Kalms (1897–1977) was an Australian tennis player. His good all-round game was marred by a weak forehand. Kalms was New South Wales state champion in 1926 and 1928. He reached the semi-finals of the 1924 Australian Championships (beating Clarence Treloar and Rupert Wertheim before losing to Richard Schlesinger). At the 1924 U.S. Championships, Kalms lost in five sets in the second round to Dean Mathey. Kalms reached the quarter-finals of the Australian in 1925 (losing to Pat O'Hara Wood) and 1928 (beating Edgar Moon before losing to Jack Cummings).

== Grand Slam finals ==
=== Doubles (1 runner-up) ===
Result	Year	Championship	Surface	Partner	Opponents	Score
Loss	1925	Australasian Championships	Grass	(Australia) James Anderson	(Australia) Pat O'Hara Wood (Australia) Gerald Patterson	4–6, 6–8, 5–7
