= Gerald Patterson =

Australian tennis player

Gerald Patterson MC
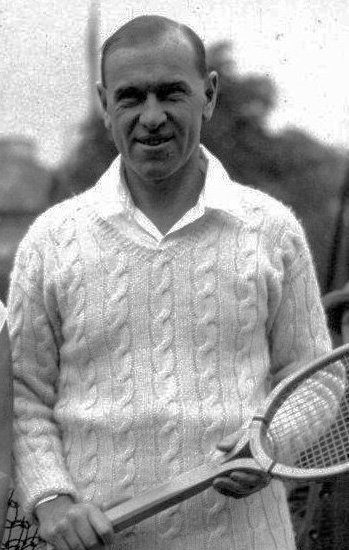
- Patterson in 1928
- Country (sports): Australia
- Born: 17 December 1895 Preston, Australia
- Died: 13 June 1967 (aged 71) Melbourne, Australia
- Turned pro: 1914 (amateur tour)
- Retired: 1928
- Plays: Right-handed (one-handed backhand)
- Int. Tennis HoF: 1989 (member page)

Singles
- Career record: 267–63 (80.9%)
- Career titles: 28
- Highest ranking: No. 1 (1919, A. Wallis Myers)

Grand Slam singles results
- Australian Open: W (1927)
- French Open: 4R (1928)
- Wimbledon: W (1919, 1922)
- US Open: SF (1922, 1924)

Doubles

Grand Slam doubles results
- Australian Open: W (1914, 1922, 1925, 1926, 1927)
- Wimbledon: F (1922, 1928)
- US Open: W (1919)

Mixed doubles

Grand Slam mixed doubles results
- Wimbledon: W (1920)

Gerald Leighton Patterson MC (17 December 1895 – 13 June 1967) was an Australian tennis player.

Patterson was active in the decade following World War I. During his career he won three Grand Slam tournaments in the singles event as well as six titles in the doubles competition and one title in mixed doubles. He was born in Melbourne, educated at Scotch College and Trinity Grammar School and died in Melbourne on 13 June 1967. He was the co-World No. 1 player for 1919 along with Bill Johnston.

== Playing career ==
Tall and well-built, Patterson played a strong serve-and-volley game. At Wimbledon 1919, Patterson beat 41-year-old Norman Brookes, who was defending champion (Brookes' 1914 title was the last held before World War 1) in the Challenge Round. At Wimbledon 1922, the Challenge Round was abolished and Patterson won the title (the first to be held at the current site at Church Road) beating Randolph Lycett in the final. In 1927, Patterson was five championship points down in the Australian singles final against Jack Hawkes, but won in five sets.

Patterson was known as the "Human Catapult" for his powerful serve that many of the top players had trouble returning. He also enjoyed great success representing Australia in Davis Cup and amassed a 32–14 win–loss record (singles 21–10, doubles 11–4) and was part of the winning team in 1919. Patterson played Davis Cup in 1920, 1922, 1924, 1925, 1928 and finally as captain in 1946. He was a player ahead of his time, playing with a steel racquet strung with wire in 1925.

He was inducted into the Sport Australia Home of Fame in December 1986. This was followed by induction into the International Tennis Hall of Fame in 1989 and the Australian Tennis Hall of Fame in August 1997.

== Personal life ==
Patterson was the nephew of Australian opera singer Dame Nellie Melba and father of racing driver Bill Patterson. In 1917, Patterson was awarded the Military Cross for "conspicuous gallantry and devotion to duty" as an officer in the Royal Field Artillery at Messines.

== Grand Slam finals ==
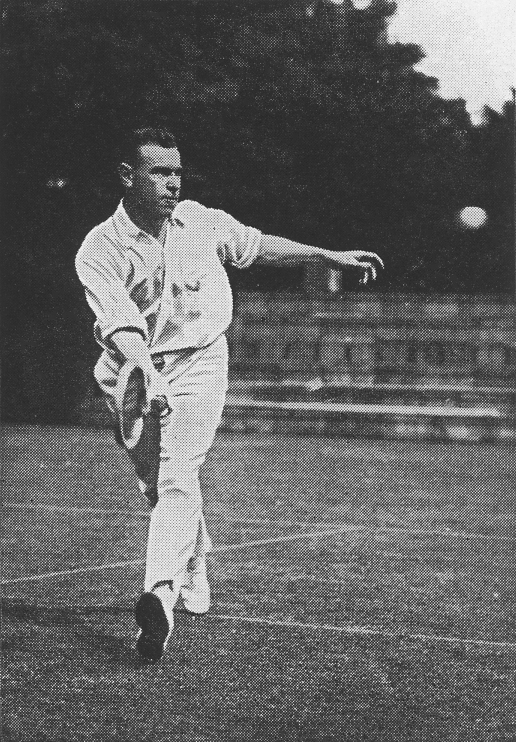
Gerald Patterson playing a forehand stroke

=== Singles: 7 (3 titles, 4 runners-up) ===
Result	Year	Championship	Surface	Opponent	Score
Loss	1914	Australasian Championships	Grass	(Australia) Arthur O'Hara Wood	4–6, 3–6, 7–5, 1–6
Win	1919	Wimbledon	Grass	(Australia) Norman Brookes	6–3, 7–5, 6–2
Loss	1920	Wimbledon	Grass	(United States) Bill Tilden	6–2, 3–6, 2–6, 4–6
Loss	1922	Australasian Championships	Grass	(Australia) James Anderson	0–6, 6–3, 6–3, 3–6, 2–6
Win	1922	Wimbledon	Grass	(United Kingdom of Great Britain and Ireland) Randolph Lycett	6–3, 6–4, 6–2
Loss	1925	Australasian Championships	Grass	(Australia) James Anderson	9–11, 6–2, 2–6, 3–6
Win	1927	Australian Championships	Grass	(Australia) John Hawkes	3–6, 6–4, 3–6, 18–16, 6–3

=== Doubles: 14 (6 titles, 8 runners-up) ===
Result	Year	Championship	Surface	Partner	Opponents	Score
Win	1914	Australasian Championships	Grass	(Australia) Ashley Campbell	(Australia) Rodney Heath (Australia) Arthur O'Hara Wood	7–5, 3–6, 6–3, 6–3
Win	1919	U.S. National Championships	Grass	(Australia) Norman Brookes	(United States) Vincent Richards (United States) Bill Tilden	8–6, 6–3, 4–6, 4–6, 6–2
Win	1922	Australasian Championships	Grass	(Australia) John Hawkes	(Australia) James Anderson (Australia) Norman Peach	8–10, 6–0, 6–0, 7–5
Loss	1922	Wimbledon	Grass	(Australia) Pat O'Hara Wood	(Australia) James Anderson (United Kingdom) Randolph Lycett	6–3, 9–7, 4–6, 3–6, 9–11
Loss	1922	U.S. National Championships	Grass	(Australia) Pat O'Hara Wood	(United States) Vincent Richards (United States) Bill Tilden	6–4, 1–6, 3–6, 4–6
Loss	1924	Australasian Championships	Grass	(Australia) Pat O'Hara Wood	(Australia) James Anderson (Australia) Norman Brookes	2–6, 4–6, 3–6
Loss	1924	U.S. National Championships	Grass	(Australia) Pat O'Hara Wood	(United States) Howard Kinsey (United States) Robert Kinsey	5–7, 7–5, 9–7, 3–6, 4–6
Win	1925	Australasian Championships	Grass	(Australia) Pat O'Hara Wood	(Australia) James Anderson (Australia) Fred Kalms	6–4, 8–6, 7–5
Loss	1925	U.S. National Championships	Grass	(Australia) John Hawkes	(United States) R. Norris Williams (United States) Vincent Richards	2–6, 10–8, 4–6, 9–11
Win	1926	Australasian Championships	Grass	(Australia) John Hawkes	(Australia) James Anderson (Australia) Pat O'Hara Wood	6–1, 6–4, 6–2
Win	1927	Australian Championships	Grass	(Australia) John Hawkes	(Australia) Ian McInness (Australia) Pat O'Hara Wood	8–6, 6–2, 6–1
Loss	1928	Wimbledon	Grass	(Australia) John Hawkes	(France) Jacques Brugnon (France) Henri Cochet	11–13, 4–6, 4–6
Loss	1928	U.S. National Championships	Grass	(Australia) John Hawkes	(United States) John Hennessey (United States) George Lott	2–6, 1–6, 2–6
Loss	1932	Australian Championships	Grass	(Australia) Harry Hopman	(Australia) Jack Crawford (Australia) Edgar Moon	10–12, 3–6, 6–4, 4–6

=== Mixed doubles: 1 (1 title) ===
Result	Year	Championship	Surface	Partner	Opponents	Score
Win	1920	Wimbledon	Grass	(France) Suzanne Lenglen	(United States) Elizabeth Ryan (United Kingdom of Great Britain and Ireland) Randolph Lycett	7–5, 6–3

== Grand Slam singles performance timeline ==
Key
W	F	SF	QF	#R	RR	Q#	DNQ	A	NH

(W) winner; (F) finalist; (SF) semifinalist; (QF) quarterfinalist; (#R) rounds 4, 3, 2, 1; (RR) round-robin stage; (Q#) qualification round; (DNQ) did not qualify; (A) absent; (NH) not held; (SR) strike rate (events won / competed); (W–L) win–loss record.

Events with a challenge round: (W_{C}) won; (CR) lost the challenge round; (F_{A}) all comers' finalist

(OF) only for French players

Tournament	1914	1915	1916	1917	1918	1919	1920	1921	1922	1923	1924	1925	1926	1927	1928	SR	W–L	Win %
Australian	F	A	not held			3R^{1}	A	A	F	A	2R	F	1R	W	QF	1 / 8	21–6	77.8
French	OF	not held					OF					A	A	A	4R	0 / 1	2–1	66.7
Wimbledon	A	not held				W_{C}	CR	A	W	A	A	A	A	A	4R	2 / 4	17–2	89.5
U.S.	A	A	A	A	A	4R	A	A	SF	A	SF	A	A	A	A	0 / 3	10–3	76.9
Win–loss	3–1	0–0	0–0	0–0	0–0	11–1	0–1	0–0	13–2	0–0	5–2	5–1	0–1	6–0	7–3	3 / 16	50–12	80.6

^{1}Patterson was the first tennis player to play in three Grand Slam singles tournaments within one calendar year.
