= James Anderson (tennis) =

Australian tennis player (1894–1973)

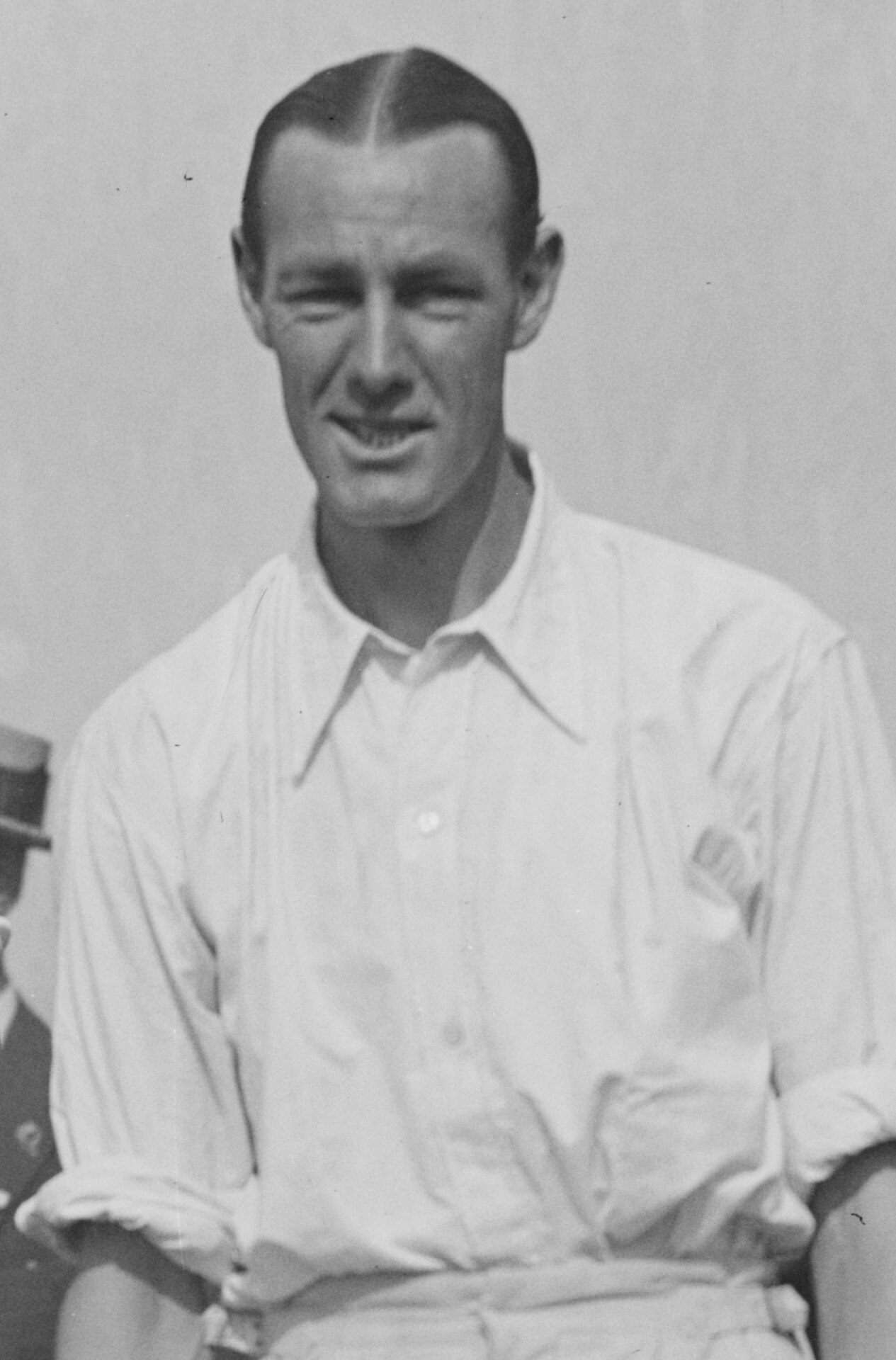
- Anderson during the 1922 Davis Cup
- Full name: James Outram Anderson
- Country (sports): Australia
- Born: 17 September 1894; Enfield, Australia
- Died: 22 December 1973 (aged 79); Gosford, Australia
- Turned pro: 1926
- Plays: Right-handed (one-handed backhand)
- Int. Tennis HoF: 2013 (member page)

Singles
- Career record: 159–35 (81.9%)
- Career titles: 15
- Highest ranking: No. 3 (1923, A. Wallis Myers)

Grand Slam singles results
- Australian Open: W (1922, 1924, 1925)
- Wimbledon: SF (1922, 1925)
- US Open: SF (1921)

Doubles

Grand Slam doubles results
- Australian Open: W (1924)
- Wimbledon: W (1922)

Team competitions
- Davis Cup: W (1919)

James Outram Anderson (17 September 1894 – 22 December 1973), commonly known as J.O. Anderson, was an Australian tennis player.

== Personal life ==
Anderson was the eighth child of James Outram Anderson and his wife Patience (née Laycock). He was educated at Camden Grammar School.

He married Maud Irene Whitfield (died 1955) on 24 March 1917. They had five children. He married a widow, Mabel Little, on 18 November 1957. Anderson died on 22 December 1973 at Gosford. He was survived by his second wife, as well as the son and four daughters of his first marriage.

In 2013, Anderson was inducted into the International Tennis Hall of Fame.

== Career ==
Anderson is best remembered for his three victories at his home tournament: the Australasian Championships in 1922, 1924 and 1925. Anderson also won the doubles tournament at the 1922 Wimbledon Championships and 1924 Australian Championships. He was celebrated in Australia for his mascot, a large toy kangaroo which he brought on court.

Between 1919 and 1925 Anderson played in 15 ties for the Australian Davis Cup team and compiled a record of 28 wins and 8 losses.

From 1929 to 1934, Anderson had an endorsement deal with the Alexander Patent Racket Company in Launceston, Tasmania, to produce a range of 'J.O. Anderson' tennis racquets.

== Playing Style ==
Anderson's best shot was his forehand drive, which he hit with very little topspin. He mastered this shot to compensate for his weak backhand shot. Anderson was nicknamed 'The Greyhound' for his quickness on the tennis court.

== Grand Slam finals ==
=== Singles: 3 titles ===
Result	Year	Championship	Surface	Opponent	Score
Win	1922	Australasian Championships	Grass	(Australia) Gerald Patterson	6–0, 3–6, 3–6, 6–3, 6–2
Win	1924	Australasian Championships	Grass	(Australia) Richard Schlesinger	6–3, 6–4, 3–6, 5–7, 6–3
Win	1925	Australasian Championships	Grass	(Australia) Gerald Patterson	11–9, 2–6, 6–2, 6–3

=== Doubles: 6 (2 titles, 4 runners-up) ===
Result	Year	Championship	Surface	Partner	Opponents	Score
Loss	1919	Australasian Championships	Grass	(United Kingdom) Arthur Lowe	(Australia) Pat O'Hara Wood (Australia) Ronald Thomas	5–7, 1–6, 9–7, 6–3, 3–6
Loss	1922	Australasian Championships	Grass	(Australia) Norman Peach	(Australia) John Hawkes (Australia) Gerald Patterson	10–8, 0–6, 0–6, 5–7
Win	1922	Wimbledon	Grass	(United Kingdom) Randolph Lycett	(Australia) Pat O'Hara Wood (Australia) Gerald Patterson	3–6, 7–9, 6–4, 6–3, 11–9
Win	1924	Australasian Championships	Grass	(Australia) Norman Brookes	(Australia) Pat O'Hara Wood (Australia) Gerald Patterson	6–2, 6–4, 6–3
Loss	1925	Australasian Championships	Grass	(Australia) Fred Kalms	(Australia) Pat O'Hara Wood (Australia) Gerald Patterson	4–6, 6–8, 5–7
Loss	1926	Australasian Championships	Grass	(Australia) Pat O'Hara Wood	(Australia) John Hawkes (Australia) Gerald Patterson	1–6, 4–6, 2–6
