= James Willard =

Australian tennis player

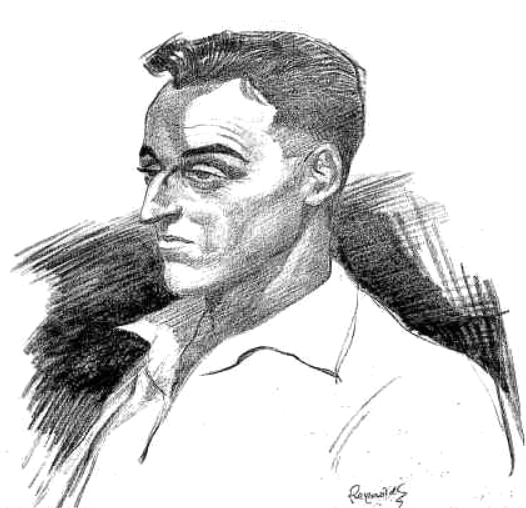
- 1929 portrait by Reynolds
- Full name: Arthur James Willard
- Country (sports): Australia
- Born: 22 April 1893; Tambaroora, New South Wales
- Died: 10 June 1968 (aged 75)
- Height: 1.68 m (5 ft 6 in)
- Plays: Right-handed (one-handed backhand)

Singles

Grand Slam singles results
- Australian Open: F (1926)
- French Open: 3R (1930)
- Wimbledon: 2R (1924)

Other tournaments
- Olympic Games: 3R (1924)

Doubles

Grand Slam doubles results
- Australian Open: F (1928)
- French Open: F (1930)
- Wimbledon: QF (1930)
- Olympic Games: 2R (1924)

Mixed doubles

Grand Slam mixed doubles results
- Australian Open: W (1924, 1925)
- Wimbledon: 3R (1930)

Arthur James Willard (22 April 1893 – 10 June 1968), better known as Jim Willard, was an Australian tennis player.

== Tennis career ==
Willard won two mixed doubles titles alongside Daphne Akhurst at the Australasian Championships, the future Australian Open, in 1924 and 1925. Willard also finished singles runner-up to John Hawkes in 1926 and reached the semifinals in 1927 and 1930. He was the mixed doubles runner-up in Australia in 1926 and 1927, and doubles runner-up at the Australian Championships in 1928 and at the French Championships in 1930. He participated in the 1924 Wimbledon Championships, losing in the second round of the singles event. He returned at the 1930 Championships where he lost in the first round of the singles event, reached the quarterfinal of the doubles with Harry Hopman and made it to the third round of the mixed doubles partnering Lolette Payot.

Willard competed in the singles and doubles event at the 1924 Summer Olympics. In the singles he made it to the third round before being defeated by Sydney Jacob. In the doubles event he teamed up with James Bayley and reached the second round in which they lost to eventual Olympic champions Vincent Richards and Frank Hunter.

Willard won the Sydney metropolitan championships in October 1929 after a victory in the final against Jack Crawford.

He became a professional player in February 1933.

From 1933 to 1941, Willard had an endorsement deal with the Alexander Patent Racket Company in Launceston, Tasmania, to produce a range of 'Jim Willard' tennis racquets.

== Grand Slam finals ==
=== Singles (1 runner-up) ===
Result	Year	Championship	Surface	Opponent	Score
Loss	1926	Australasian Championships	Grass	(Australia) John Hawkes	6–1, 6–3, 6–1

=== Doubles (2 runners-up) ===
Result	Year	Championship	Surface	Partner	Opponents	Score
Loss	1928	Australian Championships	Grass	(Australia) Edgar Moon	(France) Jean Borotra (France) Jacques Brugnon	2–6, 6–4, 4–6, 4–6
Loss	1930	French Championships	Clay	(Australia) Harry Hopman	(France) Henri Cochet (France) Jacques Brugnon	3–6, 7–9, 3–6

=== Mixed doubles (2 titles, 2 runners-up) ===
Result	Year	Championship	Surface	Partner	Opponents	Score
Win	1924	Australasian Championships	Grass	(Australia) Daphne Akhurst	(Australia) Esna Boyd Robertson (Australia) Gar Hone	6–3, 6–4
Win	1925	Australasian Championships	Grass	(Australia) Daphne Akhurst	(Australia) Sylvia Lance Harper (Australia) Robert Schlesinger	6–4, 6–4
Loss	1926	Australasian Championships	Grass	(Australia) Daphne Akhurst	(Australia) Esna Boyd Robertson (Australia) John Hawkes	2–6, 4–6
Loss	1927	Australian Championships	Grass	(Australia) Youtha Anthony	(Australia) Esna Boyd Robertson (Australia) John Hawkes	1–6, 3–6
