= Richard Schlesinger (tennis) =

Australian tennis player

Richard "Bob" Schlesinger
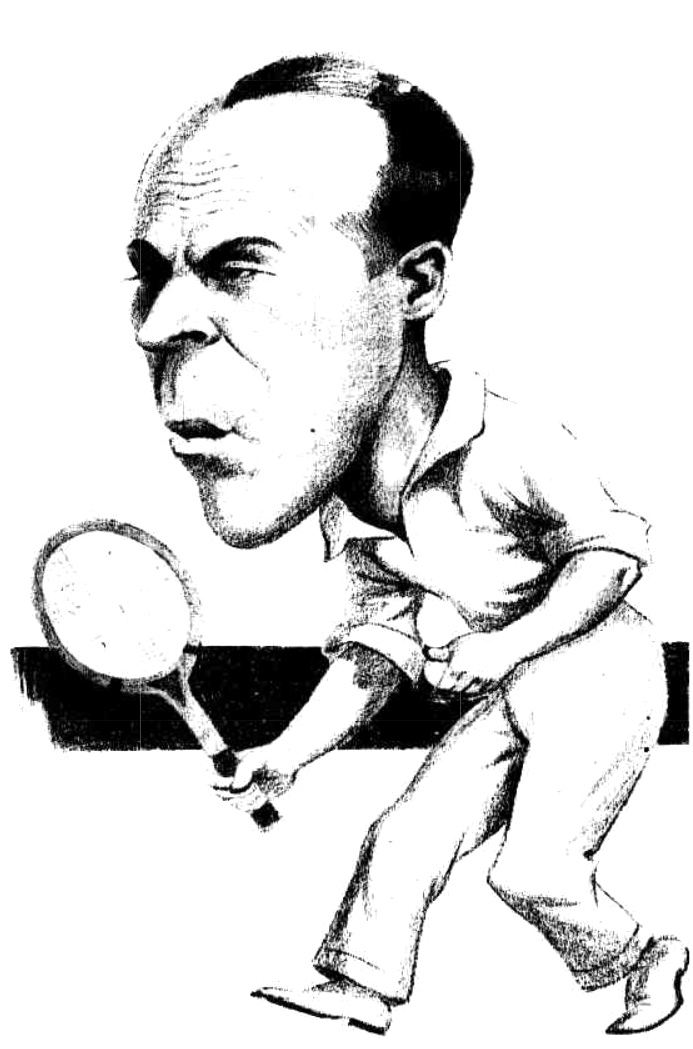
- 1929 caricature by Reynolds
- Full name: Richard Emil Schlesinger
- Country (sports): Australia
- Born: 23 September 1900 Victoria, Australia
- Died: 20 January 1968 (aged 67)
- Turned pro: 1923 (amateur tour)
- Retired: 1933
- Plays: Right-handed (one-handed backhand)

Singles

Grand Slam singles results
- Australian Open: F (1924, 1929)
- US Open: 2R (1924)

Doubles

Grand Slam doubles results
- Australian Open: SF (1926, 1927, 1928, 1929)

Grand Slam mixed doubles results
- Australian Open: F (1925)

Team competitions
- Davis Cup: F (1923^{Ch})

Richard Emil Schlesinger (23 September 1900 – 20 January 1968) was an Australian tennis player.

Schlesinger was a two-time runner-up at the Australasian Championships, the future Australian Open, losing to James Anderson in 1924, and to John Colin Gregory in 1929.

== Grand Slam finals ==
=== Singles: 2 runners-up ===
Result	Year	Championship	Surface	Opponent	Score
Loss	1924	Australasian Championships	Grass	(Australia) James Anderson	3–6, 4–6, 6–3, 7–5, 3–6
Loss	1929	Australian Championships	Grass	(United Kingdom) John Colin Gregory	2–6, 2–6, 7–5, 5–7

=== Mixed doubles: 1 runner-up ===
Result	Year	Championship	Surface	Partner	Opponents	Score
Loss	1925	Australasian Championships	Grass	(Australia) Sylvia Lance Harper	(Australia) Daphne Akhurst (Australia) James Willard	4–6, 4–6
