= 1927 in tennis =

This page covers all the important events in the sport of tennis in 1927. It provides the results of notable tournaments throughout the year on both the men's and women's ILTF tennis circuits.

== Australian Open ==
Category	Champion(s)	Finalist(s)	Score
Men's singles	(Australia) Gerald Patterson	(Australia) Jack Hawkes	3–6, 6–4, 3–6, 18–16, 6–3
Women's singles	(Australia) Esna Boyd	(Australia) Sylvia Lance Harper	5–7, 6–1, 6–2
Men's doubles	(Australia) Jack Hawkes (Australia) Gerald Patterson	(Australia) Ian McInness (Australia) Pat O'Hara Wood	8–6, 6–1, 6–2
Women's doubles	(Australia) Louie Bickerton (Australia) Meryl O'Hara Wood	(Australia) Esna Boyd (Australia) Sylvia Lance Harper	6–3, 6–3
Mixed doubles	(Australia) Esna Boyd (Australia) Jack Hawkes	(Australia) Youtha Anthony (Australia) Jim Willard	6–1, 6–3

== French Open ==
Category	Champion(s)	Finalist(s)	Score
Men's singles	(France) René Lacoste	(United States) Bill Tilden	6–4, 4–6, 5–7, 6–3, 11–9
Women's singles	(Netherlands) Kea Bouman	(South Africa) Irene Peacock	6–2, 6–4
Men's doubles	(France) Henri Cochet (France) Jacques Brugnon	(France) Jean Borotra (France) René Lacoste	2–6, 6–2, 6–0, 1–6, 6–4
Women's doubles	(South Africa) Irene Peacock (South Africa) Bobbie Heine	(United Kingdom) Peggy Saunders Mitchell (United Kingdom) Phoebe Holcroft Watson	6–2, 6–1
Mixed doubles	(France) Marguerite Broquedis (France) Jean Borotra	(Spain) Lilí de Álvarez (United States) Bill Tilden	6–4, 2–6, 6–2

== Wimbledon ==
Category	Champion(s)	Finalist(s)	Score
Men's singles	(France) Henri Cochet	(France) Jean Borotra	4–6, 4–6, 6–3, 6–4, 7–5
Women's singles	(United States) Helen Wills	(Spain) Lilí de Álvarez	6–2, 6–4
Men's doubles	(United States) Frank Hunter (United States) Bill Tilden	(France) Jacques Brugnon (France) Henri Cochet	1–6, 4–6, 8–6, 6–3, 6–4
Women's doubles	(United States) Elizabeth Ryan (United States) Helen Wills	(South Africa) Bobbie Heine (South Africa) Irene Peacock	6–3, 6–2
Mixed doubles	(United States) Frank Hunter (United States) Elizabeth Ryan	(United Kingdom) Leslie Godfree (United Kingdom) Kitty Godfree	8–6, 6–0

== US Open ==
Category	Champion(s)	Finalist(s)	Score
Men's singles	(France) René Lacoste	(United States) Bill Tilden	11–9, 6–3, 11–9
Women's singles	(United States) Helen Wills	(United Kingdom) Betty Nuthall	6–1, 6–4
Men's doubles	(United States) Bill Tilden (United States) Frank Hunter	(United States) Bill Johnston (United States) R. Norris Williams	10–8, 6–3, 6–3
Women's doubles	(United Kingdom) Kitty McKane Godfree (United Kingdom) Ermyntrude Harvey	(United Kingdom) Betty Nuthall (United Kingdom) Joan Fry	6–1, 4–6, 6–4
Mixed doubles	(United Kingdom) Eileen Bennett (France) Henri Cochet	(United States) Hazel Hotchkiss Wightman (France) René Lacoste	6–2, 0–6, 6–3
