= 1930 in tennis =

This page covers all the important events in the sport of tennis in 1930. It provides the results of notable tournaments throughout the year on both the men's and women's ILTF tennis circuits.

== Australian Open ==
| Category | Champion(s) | Finalist(s) | Score |
|---|---|---|---|
| Men's singles | (Australia) Gar Moon | (Australia) Harry Hopman | 6–3, 6–1, 6–3 |
| Women's singles | (Australia) Daphne Akhurst | (Australia) Sylvia Harper | 10–8, 2–6, 7–5 |
| Men's doubles | (Australia) Jack Crawford (Australia) Harry Hopman | (Australia) Tim Fitchett (Australia) Jack Hawkes | 8–6, 6–1, 2–6, 6–3 |
| Women's doubles | (Australia) Emily Hood (Australia) Mall Molesworth | (Australia) Marjorie Cox (Australia) Sylvia Harper | 6–3, 0–6, 7–5 |
| Mixed doubles | (Australia) Nell Hall (Australia) Harry Hopman | (Australia) Marjorie Cox (Australia) Jack Crawford | 11–9, 3–6, 6–3 |

== French Open ==
| Category | Champion(s) | Finalist(s) | Score |
|---|---|---|---|
| Men's singles | (France) Henri Cochet | (United States) Bill Tilden | 3–6, 8–6, 6–3, 6–1 |
| Women's singles | (United States) Helen Wills Moody | (United States) Helen Jacobs | 6–2, 6–1 |
| Men's doubles | (France) Henri Cochet (France) Jacques Brugnon | (Australia) Harry Hopman (Australia) Jim Willard | 6–3, 9–7, 6–3 |
| Women's doubles | (United States) Helen Wills Moody (United States) Elizabeth Ryan | (France) Simone Barbier (France) Simonne Mathieu | 6–3, 6–1 |
| Mixed doubles | (Germany) Cilly Aussem (United States) Bill Tilden | (United Kingdom) Eileen Bennett Whittingstall (France) Henri Cochet | 6–4, 6–4 |
| Seniors over 40 singles | (Germany) Otto Froitzheim | (France) François Blanchy | 6-0, 6-4 |

== Wimbledon ==
| Category | Champion(s) | Finalist(s) | Score |
|---|---|---|---|
| Men's singles | (United States) Bill Tilden | (United States) Wilmer Allison | 6–3, 9–7, 6–4 |
| Women's singles | (United States) Helen Moody | (United States) Elizabeth Ryan | 6–2, 6–2 |
| Men's doubles | (United States) Wilmer Allison (United States) John Van Ryn | (United States) John Doeg (United States) George Lott | 6–3, 6–3, 6–2 |
| Women's doubles | (United States) Helen Moody (United States) Elizabeth Ryan | (United States) Edith Cross (United States) Sarah Palfrey | 6–2, 9–7 |
| Mixed doubles | (Australia) Jack Crawford (United States) Elizabeth Ryan | (Germany) Daniel Prenn (Germany) Hilde Krahwinkel | 6–1, 6–3 |

== US Open ==
| Category | Champion(s) | Finalist(s) | Score |
|---|---|---|---|
| Men's singles | (United States) John Doeg | (United States) Frank Shields | 10–8, 1–6, 6–4, 16–14 |
| Women's singles | (United Kingdom) Betty Nuthall | (United States) Anna McCune Harper | 6–1, 6–4 |
| Men's doubles | (United States) George Lott (United States) John Doeg | (United States) Wilmer Allison (United States) John Van Ryn | 8–6, 6–3, 4–6, 13–15, 6–4 |
| Women's doubles | (United Kingdom) Betty Nuthall (United States) Sarah Palfrey | (United States) Edith Cross (United States) Anna McCune Harper | 3–6, 6–3, 7–5 |
| Mixed doubles | (United States) Edith Cross (United States) Wilmer Allison | (United States) Marjorie Morrill (United States) Frank Shields | 6–4, 6–4 |
