= 1926 in tennis =

This page covers all the important events in the sport of tennis in 1926. It provides the results of notable tournaments throughout the year on both the men's and women's ILTF tennis circuits.

== Australian Open ==
Category	Champion(s)	Finalist(s)	Score
Men's singles	(Australia) Jack Hawkes	(Australia) Jim Willard	6–1, 6–3, 6–1
Women's singles	(Australia) Daphne Akhurst	(Australia) Esna Boyd	6–1, 6–3
Men's doubles	(Australia) Jack Hawkes (Australia) Gerald Patterson	(Australia) James Anderson (Australia) Pat O'Hara Wood	6–1, 6–4, 6–2
Women's doubles	(Australia) Esna Boyd (Australia) Meryl O'Hara Wood	(Australia) Daphne Akhurst (Australia) Marjorie Cox	6–3, 6–8, 8–6
Mixed doubles	(Australia) Esna Boyd (Australia) Jack Hawkes	(Australia) Daphne Akhurst (Australia) Jim Willard	6–2, 6–4

== French Open ==
Category	Champion(s)	Finalist(s)	Score
Men's singles	(France) Henri Cochet	(France) René Lacoste	6–2, 6–4, 6–3
Women's singles	(France) Suzanne Lenglen	(United States) Mary Browne	6–1, 6–0
Men's doubles	(United States) Vincent Richards (United States) Howard Kinsey	(France) Henri Cochet (France) Jacques Brugnon	6–4, 6–1, 4–6, 6–4
Women's doubles	(France) Suzanne Lenglen (France) Julie Vlasto	(United Kingdom) Evelyn Colyer (United Kingdom) Kitty McKane	6–1, 6–1
Mixed doubles	(France) Suzanne Lenglen (France) Jacques Brugnon	(France) Nanette le Besnerais (France) Jean Borotra	6–4, 6–3

== Wimbledon ==
Category	Champion(s)	Finalist(s)	Score
Men's singles	(France) Jean Borotra	(United States) Howard Kinsey	8–6, 6–1, 6–3
Women's singles	(United Kingdom) Kitty Godfree	(Spain) Lilí de Álvarez	6–2, 4–6, 6–3
Men's doubles	(France) Jacques Brugnon (France) Henri Cochet	(United States) Howard Kinsey (United States) Vincent Richards	7–5, 4–6, 6–3, 6–2
Women's doubles	(United States) Mary Browne (United States) Elizabeth Ryan	(United Kingdom) Kitty Godfree (United Kingdom) Evelyn Colyer	6–1, 6–1
Mixed doubles	(United Kingdom) Leslie Godfree (Note: The Godfrees are the only married couple to have won the mixed doubles title.) (United Kingdom) Kitty Godfree	(United States) Howard Kinsey (United States) Mary Browne	6–3, 6–4

== US Open ==
Category	Champion(s)	Finalist(s)	Score
Men's singles	(France) René Lacoste	(France) Jean Borotra	6–4, 6–0, 6–4
Women's singles	(United States) Molla Bjurstedt Mallory	(United States) Elizabeth Ryan	4–6, 6–4, 9–7
Men's doubles	(United States) Richard Norris Williams (United States) Vincent Richards	(United States) Bill Tilden (United States) Alfred Chapin	6–4, 6–8, 11–9, 6–3
Women's doubles	(United States) Elizabeth Ryan (United States) Eleanor Goss	(United States) Mary K. Browne (United States) Charlotte Chapin	3–6, 6–4, 12–10
Mixed doubles	(United States) Elizabeth Ryan (France) Jean Borotra	(United States) Hazel Hotchkiss Wightman (France) René Lacoste	6–4, 7–5
