= 1926 Australasian Championships – Men's doubles =

Men's doubles
- 1926 Australasian Championships

Final
- Champions: (Australia) Jack Hawkes (Australia) Gerald Patterson
- Runners-up: (Australia) James Anderson (Australia) Pat O'Hara Wood
- Score: 6–1, 6–4, 6–2

Details
- Draw: 22
- Seeds: 4

Events
| Singles | men | women | | boys | girls |
| Doubles | men | women | mixed | boys | girls |
| ← 1925 · | Australasian Championships | · 1927 → |

The first-seeds Jack Hawkes and Gerald Patterson claimed their second title by defeating James Anderson and Pat O'Hara Wood 6–1, 6–4, 6–2 in the final, to win the men's doubles tennis title at the 1926 Australasian Championships.

== Seeds ==
1. (Australia) Jack Hawkes / (Australia) Gerald Patterson (champions)
2. (Australia) James Anderson / (Australia) Pat O'Hara Wood (final)
3. (Australia) Norman Peach / (Australia) Jim Willard (quarterfinals)
4. (Australia) Bob Schlesinger / (Australia) Rupert Wertheim (semifinals)
5. (Australia) Gar Hone / (Australia) Ernest Rowe (quarterfinals)
6. (Australia) Dudley Cameron / (Australia) Gar Moon (quarterfinals)
7. (Australia) Rice Gemmell / (Australia) Colin Gurner (semifinals)
8. (Australia) W. R. James / (Australia) Colin Newton (quarterfinals)

== Draw ==
=== Key ===
- Q = Qualifier
- WC = Wild card
- LL = Lucky loser
- Alt = Alternate
- ITF = ITF entry
- PR = Protected ranking
- SR = Special ranking
- SE = Special exempt
- JE = Junior exempt
- JR = Junior Accelerator Programme entrant
- CO = College Accelerator Programme entrant
- NG = Next Gen Accelerator Program entrant
- w/o = Walkover
- r = Retired
- d = Defaulted

=== Finals ===
Quarterfinals
2 | (Australia) James Anderson (Australia) Pat O'Hara Wood | 6 | 6 | 6
6 | (Australia) Dudley Cameron (Australia) Gar Moon | 1 | 4 | 0
7 | (Australia) Rice Gemmell (Australia) Colin Gurner | 6 | 3 | 6 | 3 | 8
3 | (Australia) Norman Peach (Australia) Jim Willard | 1 | 6 | 3 | 6 | 6
4 | (Australia) Bob Schlesinger (Australia) Rupert Wertheim | 6 | 6 | 6
8 | (Australia) W. R. James (Australia) Colin Newton | 2 | 4 | 2
5 | (Australia) Gar Hone (Australia) Ernest Rowe
1 | (Australia) Jack Hawkes (Australia) Gerald Patterson | w/o

Semifinals
2 | (Australia) James Anderson (Australia) Pat O'Hara Wood | 6 | 6 | 6
7 | (Australia) Rice Gemmell (Australia) Colin Gurner | 2 | 3 | 0
4 | (Australia) Bob Schlesinger (Australia) Rupert Wertheim | 2 | 1 | 8 | 2
1 | (Australia) Jack Hawkes (Australia) Gerald Patterson | 6 | 6 | 6 | 6

Final
2 | (Australia) James Anderson (Australia) Pat O'Hara Wood | 1 | 4 | 2
1 | (Australia) Jack Hawkes (Australia) Gerald Patterson | 6 | 6 | 6

=== Earlier rounds ===
==== Section 1 ====
First round
2 | (Australia) James Anderson (Australia) Pat O'Hara Wood | 6 | 6 | 6
(Australia) Jack Sherwood (Australia) Clifford Sproule | 0 | 2 | 2
(Australia) Ron Hone (Australia) Harry Nott | 8 | 7 | 6
(Australia) Jim Black (Australia) Don Turnbull | 6 | 5 | 4
6 | (Australia) Dudley Cameron (Australia) Gar Moon | 6 | 6 | 6
(Australia) Allan Barnard (Australia) Cliff Harvey | 1 | 2 | 2

Second round
2 | (Australia) James Anderson (Australia) Pat O'Hara Wood | 6 | 6 | 6
(Australia) Ron Hone (Australia) Harry Nott | 2 | 4 | 3
6 | (Australia) Dudley Cameron (Australia) Gar Moon | 6 | 6 | 6
(Australia) Ron Ford (Australia) Cecil Lamb | 4 | 2 | 3
7 | (Australia) Rice Gemmell (Australia) Colin Gurner | 4 | 8 | 6 | 6
(Australia) Jack Crawford (Australia) Harry Hopman | 6 | 6 | 4 | 0
3 | (Australia) Norman Peach (Australia) Jim Willard | 6 | 6 | 6
(Australia) Alan Coldham (Australia) Jack Turner | 1 | 3 | 3

Quarterfinals
2 | (Australia) James Anderson (Australia) Pat O'Hara Wood | 6 | 6 | 6
6 | (Australia) Dudley Cameron (Australia) Gar Moon | 1 | 4 | 0
7 | (Australia) Rice Gemmell (Australia) Colin Gurner | 6 | 3 | 6 | 3 | 8
3 | (Australia) Norman Peach (Australia) Jim Willard | 1 | 6 | 3 | 6 | 6

Semifinals
2 | (Australia) James Anderson (Australia) Pat O'Hara Wood | 6 | 6 | 6
7 | (Australia) Rice Gemmell (Australia) Colin Gurner | 2 | 3 | 0

==== Section 2 ====
First round
(Australia) Ken Berriman (Australia) Don Mellish | 8 | 8 | 6
(Australia) Arthur Collins (Australia) Lindsay Collins | 6 | 6 | 2
(Australia) Gerald O'Dea (Australia) Geoff Thomas | 7 | 7 | 9 | 6
(Australia) Basil Fitchett (Australia) Gordon Lum | 5 | 9 | 7 | 2
8 | (Australia) W. R. James (Australia) Colin Newton | 6 | 6 | 6
(Australia) Bob Fotheringham (Australia) Alan Treloar | 2 | 2 | 4

Second round
4 | (Australia) Bob Schlesinger (Australia) Rupert Wertheim | 6 | 6 | 6
(Australia) Ken Berriman (Australia) Don Mellish | 4 | 0 | 3
(Australia) Gerald O'Dea (Australia) Geoff Thomas | 3 | 4 | 2
8 | (Australia) W. R. James (Australia) Colin Newton | 6 | 6 | 6
5 | (Australia) Gar Hone (Australia) Ernest Rowe | 6 | 6 | 6
(Australia) Leo Fogarty (Australia) Mark Fogarty | 1 | 2 | 3
1 | (Australia) Jack Hawkes (Australia) Gerald Patterson | 6 | 6 | 6
(Australia) Alfred Chave (Australia) H. W. Smith | 0 | 1 | 1

Quarterfinals
4 | (Australia) Bob Schlesinger (Australia) Rupert Wertheim | 6 | 6 | 6
8 | (Australia) W. R. James (Australia) Colin Newton | 2 | 4 | 2
5 | (Australia) Gar Hone (Australia) Ernest Rowe
1 | (Australia) Jack Hawkes (Australia) Gerald Patterson | w/o

Semifinals
4 | (Australia) Bob Schlesinger (Australia) Rupert Wertheim | 2 | 1 | 8 | 2
1 | (Australia) Jack Hawkes (Australia) Gerald Patterson | 6 | 6 | 6 | 6

== Notes ==
- 2R Gemmell/Gurner vs. Crawford/Hopman: some sources switch results of 2nd and 3rd set.
- 2R O'Dea/Thomas vs. James/Newton: some sources give 4–6, 2–6, 4–6.
