= 1930 Australian Championships – Mixed doubles =

Mixed doubles
- 1930 Australian Championships

Final
- Champions: (Australia) Nell Hall (Australia) Harry Hopman
- Runners-up: (Australia) Marjorie Cox (Australia) Jack Crawford
- Score: 11–9, 3–6, 6–3

Details
- Draw: 21
- Seeds: 4

Events
Singles	men	women		boys	girls
Doubles	men	women	mixed	boys	girls
- Australian Championships

In the duel between future married couples and multiple winners Nell Hall and Harry Hopman defeated Marjorie Cox and Jack Crawford 11–9, 3–6, 6–3 in the final, to win the mixed doubles tennis title at the 1930 Australian Championships.

== Seeds ==
1. (Australia) Daphne Akhurst / (Australia) Gar Moon (semifinals)
2. (Australia) Louie Bickerton / (Australia) Jim Willard (semifinals)
3. (Australia) Marjorie Cox / (Australia) Jack Crawford (final)
4. (Australia) Sylvia Harper / (Australia) Jack Hawkes (quarterfinals)

== Draw ==
Key

- Q = Qualifier
- WC = Wild card
- LL = Lucky loser
- Alt = Alternate
- ITF = ITF entry
- PR = Protected ranking
- SR = Special ranking
- SE = Special exempt
- JE = Junior exempt
- JR = Junior Accelerator Programme entrant
- CO = College Accelerator Programme entrant
- NG = Next Gen Accelerator Program entrant
- w/o = Walkover
- r = Retired
- d = Defaulted

=== Finals ===
Quarterfinals
2	(Australia) Louie Bickerton (Australia) Jim Willard	6	3	6
(Australia) Emily Hood (Australia) Norman Peach	4	6	2
4	(Australia) Sylvia Harper (Australia) Jack Hawkes	3	2
(Australia) Nell Hall (Australia) Harry Hopman	6	6
1	(Australia) Daphne Akhurst (Australia) Gar Moon	w/o
(Australia) Kath Murdoch (Australia) Jack Clemenger (Note: In his quarterfinal match of the men's singles event Clemenger redeveloped foot injury and had to withdraw from the tournament afterwards.)
3	(Australia) Marjorie Cox (Australia) Jack Crawford	6	6
(Australia) Mall Molesworth (Australia) John Grinstead	1	4

Semifinals
2	(Australia) Louie Bickerton (Australia) Jim Willard	2	13	2
(Australia) Nell Hall (Australia) Harry Hopman	6	11	6
1	(Australia) Daphne Akhurst (Australia) Gar Moon	10	7	4
3	(Australia) Marjorie Cox (Australia) Jack Crawford	12	5	6

Final
(Australia) Nell Hall (Australia) Harry Hopman	11	3	6
3	(Australia) Marjorie Cox (Australia) Jack Crawford	9	6	3

=== Earlier rounds ===
==== Section 1 ====
First round
(Australia) Gladys Toyne (Australia) Harry Hassett	6	6
(Australia) Vere de Bavay (Australia) Thomas Robinson	3	2
(Australia) Nell Hall (Australia) Harry Hopman	6	6
(Australia) Frances Hoddle-Wrigley (Australia) Horace Crebbin	2	3
(Australia) Kath Commins (Australia) Frank Peach	2	6	6
(Australia) Kathleen Le Messurier (Australia) Don Turnbull	6	3	3

Second round
2	(Australia) Louie Bickerton (Australia) Jim Willard	6	6
(Australia) Molly Muirhead (Australia) Charles Buckley	0	2
(Australia) Emily Hood (Australia) Norman Peach	6	6
(Australia) Peter Smith (Australia) Bill Halliday	4	2
4	(Australia) Sylvia Harper (Australia) Jack Hawkes	9	6	7
(Australia) Gladys Toyne (Australia) Harry Hassett	11	1	5
(Australia) Nell Hall (Australia) Harry Hopman	6	6
(Australia) Kath Commins (Australia) Frank Peach	2	3

Quarterfinals
2	(Australia) Louie Bickerton (Australia) Jim Willard	6	3	6
(Australia) Emily Hood (Australia) Norman Peach	4	6	2
4	(Australia) Sylvia Harper (Australia) Jack Hawkes	3	2
(Australia) Nell Hall (Australia) Harry Hopman	6	6

Semifinals
2	(Australia) Louie Bickerton (Australia) Jim Willard	2	13	2
(Australia) Nell Hall (Australia) Harry Hopman	6	11	6

==== Section 2 ====
First round
1	(Australia) Daphne Akhurst (Australia) Gar Moon	6	6
(Australia) Jean Wilson (Australia) Ron Hone	2	2
(Australia) Dorothy Weston (Australia) Ernest Rowe	1	6	9
(Australia) Mary Derham (Australia) Clifford Sproule	6	4	7

Second round
1	(Australia) Daphne Akhurst (Australia) Gar Moon	9	16
(Australia) Dorothy Weston (Australia) Ernest Rowe	7	14
(Australia) Kath Murdoch (Australia) Jack Clemenger	w/o
(Australia) Birdie Bond (Australia) Allan Knight
3	(Australia) Marjorie Cox (Australia) Jack Crawford	6	6
(Australia) Edna Collison (Australia) Gemmell Payne	1	4
(Australia) Mall Molesworth (Australia) John Grinstead	6	6
(Australia) Mollie McGrath (Australia) Ron Ford	2	4

Quarterfinals
1	(Australia) Daphne Akhurst (Australia) Gar Moon	w/o
(Australia) Kath Murdoch (Australia) Jack Clemenger
3	(Australia) Marjorie Cox (Australia) Jack Crawford	6	6
(Australia) Mall Molesworth (Australia) John Grinstead	1	4

Semifinals
1	(Australia) Daphne Akhurst (Australia) Gar Moon	10	7	4
3	(Australia) Marjorie Cox (Australia) Jack Crawford	12	5	6
