= 1926 Australasian Championships – Mixed doubles =

Mixed doubles
- 1926 Australasian Championships

Final
- Champions: (Australia) Esna Boyd (Australia) Jack Hawkes
- Runners-up: (Australia) Daphne Akhurst (Australia) Jim Willard
- Score: 6–2, 6–4

Details
- Draw: 20
- Seeds: 8

Events
Singles	men	women		boys	girls
Doubles	men	women	mixed	boys	girls
← 1925 ·	Australasian Championships	· 1927 →

Second-seeded Esna Boyd and Jack Hawkes defeated the first seeds Daphne Akhurst and Jim Willard 6–2, 6–4 in the final, to win the mixed doubles tennis title at the 1926 Australasian Championships.

With this win Hawkes completed a Triple Crown achievement, having already won his singles and doubles titles.

== Seeds ==
1. (Australia) Daphne Akhurst / (Australia) Jim Willard (final)
2. (Australia) Esna Boyd / (Australia) Jack Hawkes (champions)
3. (Australia) Meryl O'Hara Wood / (Australia) Pat O'Hara Wood (semifinals)
4. (Australia) Sylvia Harper / (Australia) Gar Hone (semifinals)
5. (Australia) Marjorie Cox / (Australia) Rupert Wertheim (quarterfinals)
6. (Australia) Kathleen Le Messurier / (Australia) Bob Schlesinger (quarterfinals)
7. n/a ^{[a]}
8. (Australia) Dorothy Weston / (Australia) Ernest Rowe (first round)

== Draw ==
Key

- Q = Qualifier
- WC = Wild card
- LL = Lucky loser
- Alt = Alternate
- ITF = ITF entry
- PR = Protected ranking
- SR = Special ranking
- SE = Special exempt
- JE = Junior exempt
- JR = Junior Accelerator Programme entrant
- CO = College Accelerator Programme entrant
- NG = Next Gen Accelerator Program entrant
- w/o = Walkover
- r = Retired
- d = Defaulted

=== Finals ===
Quarterfinals
2	(Australia) Esna Boyd (Australia) Jack Hawkes	7	6
6	(Australia) Kathleen Le Messurier (Australia) Bob Schlesinger	5	2
(Australia) Lorna Bollen (Australia) Jack Crawford	4	4
4	(Australia) Sylvia Harper (Australia) Gar Hone	6	6
1	(Australia) Daphne Akhurst (Australia) Jim Willard	7	6	6
5	(Australia) Marjorie Cox (Australia) Rupert Wertheim	9	3	3
(Australia) Alison Hooper (Australia) Gar Moon	0	0
3	(Australia) Meryl O'Hara Wood (Australia) Pat O'Hara Wood	6	6

Semifinals
2	(Australia) Esna Boyd (Australia) Jack Hawkes	6	5	6
4	(Australia) Sylvia Harper (Australia) Gar Hone	2	7	4
1	(Australia) Daphne Akhurst (Australia) Jim Willard	7	6
3	(Australia) Meryl O'Hara Wood (Australia) Pat O'Hara Wood	5	4

Final
2	(Australia) Esna Boyd (Australia) Jack Hawkes	6	6
1	(Australia) Daphne Akhurst (Australia) Jim Willard	2	4

=== Earlier rounds ===
==== Section 1 ====
First round
(Australia) Margaret Officer (Australia) Rice Gemmell	6	8
8	(Australia) Dorothy Weston (Australia) Ernest Rowe	2	6
(Australia) Lorna Bollen (Australia) Jack Crawford	6	3	6
(Australia) Anna Menz (Australia) Don Mellish	4	6	3

Second round
2	(Australia) Esna Boyd (Australia) Jack Hawkes	6	6
(Australia) Edna Lawrence (Australia) Alan Treloar	3	0
6	(Australia) Kathleen Le Messurier (Australia) Bob Schlesinger	6	6
(Australia) Beryl Turner (Australia) Dudley Cameron	2	2
(Australia) Margaret Officer (Australia) Rice Gemmell	4	6	2
(Australia) Lorna Bollen (Australia) Jack Crawford	6	3	6
4	(Australia) Sylvia Harper (Australia) Gar Hone	6	6
(Australia) Jocelyn Bowman (Australia) Jack Sherwood	1	3

Quarterfinals
2	(Australia) Esna Boyd (Australia) Jack Hawkes	7	6
6	(Australia) Kathleen Le Messurier (Australia) Bob Schlesinger	5	2
(Australia) Lorna Bollen (Australia) Jack Crawford	4	4
4	(Australia) Sylvia Harper (Australia) Gar Hone	6	6

Semifinals
2	(Australia) Esna Boyd (Australia) Jack Hawkes	6	5	6
4	(Australia) Sylvia Harper (Australia) Gar Hone	2	7	4

==== Section 2 ====
First round
1	(Australia) Daphne Akhurst (Australia) Jim Willard	7	7
(Australia) Nell Hamilton (Australia) Ron Hone	5	5
(Australia) Minnie Richardson (Australia) Colin Newton	7	6	6
(Australia) Molly Finlayson ^{[b]} (Australia) Clifford Sproule	5	8	3

Second round
1	(Australia) Daphne Akhurst (Australia) Jim Willard	6	6
(Australia) Minnie Richardson (Australia) Colin Newton	3	1
5	(Australia) Marjorie Cox (Australia) Rupert Wertheim	6	6
(Australia) Constance Halloran (Australia) Bob Fotheringham	2	2
(Australia) Alison Hooper (Australia) Gar Moon	w/o	^{[d]}
(7)	(Australia) Vera Mathias (Australia) Ken Berriman ^{[c]}	^{[d]}
3	(Australia) Meryl O'Hara Wood (Australia) Pat O'Hara Wood	6	6
(Australia) Joyce Lillecrapp (Australia) Harry Hopman	2	2

Quarterfinals
1	(Australia) Daphne Akhurst (Australia) Jim Willard	7	6	6
5	(Australia) Marjorie Cox (Australia) Rupert Wertheim	9	3	3
(Australia) Alison Hooper (Australia) Gar Moon	0	0
3	(Australia) Meryl O'Hara Wood (Australia) Pat O'Hara Wood	6	6

Semifinals
1	(Australia) Daphne Akhurst (Australia) Jim Willard	7	6
3	(Australia) Meryl O'Hara Wood (Australia) Pat O'Hara Wood	5	4

== Notes ==
- ^{a} Originally the 7th seeds were Vera Mathias and Norman Peach, but the latter apparently withdrew from the event.
- ^{b} Most likely. Often spelled Miss C. Finlayson, even in sources that mentioned her as Miss M. Finlayson in other articles.
- ^{c} List of entrants pairs Mrs. Mathias with Ken Berriman.
- ^{d} Probably (see: ^{[a]} and ^{[c]}). No source gives an information about such a draw, let alone the result.
