= 1927 Australian Championships – Men's doubles =

Men's doubles
- 1927 Australian Championships

Final
- Champions: (Australia) Jack Hawkes (Australia) Gerald Patterson
- Runners-up: (Australia) Ian McInnes (Australia) Pat O'Hara Wood
- Score: 8–6, 6–1, 6–2

Details
- Draw: 21
- Seeds: 4

Events
Singles	men	women		boys	girls
Doubles	men	women	mixed	boys	girls
- Australian Championships

The first-seeds Jack Hawkes and Gerald Patterson successfully defended their title by defeating Ian McInnes and Pat O'Hara Wood 8–6, 6–1, 6–2 in the final, to win the men's doubles tennis title at the 1927 Australian Championships.

== Seeds ==
1. (Australia) Jack Hawkes / (Australia) Gerald Patterson (champions)
2. (Australia) Jack Crawford / (Australia) Jim Willard (semifinals)
3. (Australia) Ian McInnes / (Australia) Pat O'Hara Wood (final)
4. (Australia) Tim Fitchett / (Australia) Rupert Wertheim (quarterfinals)

== Draw ==
Key

- Q = Qualifier
- WC = Wild card
- LL = Lucky loser
- Alt = Alternate
- ITF = ITF entry
- PR = Protected ranking
- SR = Special ranking
- SE = Special exempt
- JE = Junior exempt
- JR = Junior Accelerator Programme entrant
- CO = College Accelerator Programme entrant
- NG = Next Gen Accelerator Program entrant
- w/o = Walkover
- r = Retired
- d = Defaulted

=== Finals ===
Quarterfinals
1	(Australia) Jack Hawkes (Australia) Gerald Patterson	6	6	4	6
(Australia) Ron Hone (Australia) W. R. James	1	4	6	2
(France) Léonce Aslangul (Australia) Bob Schlesinger	6	6	0	4	7
4	(Australia) Tim Fitchett (Australia) Rupert Wertheim	3	1	6	6	5
3	(Australia) Ian McInnes (Australia) Pat O'Hara Wood	6	6	6
(Australia) Harry Hopman (Australia) Gar Moon	3	2	2
(Australia) Reg MacGillicuddy (Australia) Hector Wallace	1	6	6	2
2	(Australia) Jack Crawford (Australia) Jim Willard	6	8	3	6	^{[a]}

Semifinals
1	(Australia) Jack Hawkes (Australia) Gerald Patterson	8	9	6	6
(France) Léonce Aslangul (Australia) Bob Schlesinger	10	7	4	1
3	(Australia) Ian McInnes (Australia) Pat O'Hara Wood	6	6	6
2	(Australia) Jack Crawford (Australia) Jim Willard	4	3	0

Final
1	(Australia) Jack Hawkes (Australia) Gerald Patterson	8	6	6
3	(Australia) Ian McInnes (Australia) Pat O'Hara Wood	6	1	2

=== Earlier rounds ===
==== Section 1 ====
First round
(France) Léonce Aslangul (Australia) Bob Schlesinger	6	6	3	6
(Australia) Charles Buckley (Australia) Norman Roberts	0	2	6	3
(Australia) Rice Gemmell (Australia) Gordon Lum	9	4	8	7
(Australia) Ben Dunlop (Australia) Harold Wilson	7	6	6	5
(Australia) Frank Broadhurst (Australia) Spencer Millear	6	4	6	6
(Australia) T. Grimstead ^{[b]} (Australia) H. W. Smith	4	6	4	4

Second round
1	(Australia) Jack Hawkes (Australia) Gerald Patterson	6	6	6
(Australia) Rupert Shepherd (Australia) Don Turnbull	3	2	1
(Australia) Ron Hone (Australia) W. R. James	6	6	3	6
(Australia) Bill Halliday (Australia) Harry Jacoby	4	1	6	1
(France) Léonce Aslangul (Australia) Bob Schlesinger	5	17	6	6
(Australia) Rice Gemmell (Australia) Gordon Lum	7	15	2	4
(Australia) Frank Broadhurst (Australia) Spencer Millear	1	0	2
4	(Australia) Tim Fitchett (Australia) Rupert Wertheim	6	6	6

Quarterfinals
1	(Australia) Jack Hawkes (Australia) Gerald Patterson	6	6	4	6
(Australia) Ron Hone (Australia) W. R. James	1	4	6	2
(France) Léonce Aslangul (Australia) Bob Schlesinger	6	6	0	4	7
4	(Australia) Tim Fitchett (Australia) Rupert Wertheim	3	1	6	6	5

Semifinals
1	(Australia) Jack Hawkes (Australia) Gerald Patterson	8	9	6	6
(France) Léonce Aslangul (Australia) Bob Schlesinger	10	7	4	1

==== Section 2 ====
First round
(Australia) Alan Coldham (Australia) J. Clinton Reed	6	7	7
(Australia) Owen Breden (Australia) Harry Hicks	1	5	5
2	(Australia) Jack Crawford (Australia) Jim Willard	6	8	6
(Australia) Horace Crebbin (Australia) Norman Strange	3	6	4

Second round
3	(Australia) Ian McInnes (Australia) Pat O'Hara Wood	6	3	6	6
(Australia) Rodney Heath (Australia) E. D. Yencken	3	6	3	3
(Australia) Harry Hopman (Australia) Gar Moon	6	6	11
(Australia) Ron Ford (Australia) Cecil Lamb	1	4	9
(Australia) Reg MacGillicuddy (Australia) Hector Wallace	w/o
(Australia) D'Arcy Mullamphy (Australia) Frank Targett
(Australia) Alan Coldham (Australia) J. Clinton Reed	6	1	1	0
2	(Australia) Jack Crawford (Australia) Jim Willard	2	6	6	6

Quarterfinals
3	(Australia) Ian McInnes (Australia) Pat O'Hara Wood	6	6	6
(Australia) Harry Hopman (Australia) Gar Moon	3	2	2
(Australia) Reg MacGillicuddy (Australia) Hector Wallace	1	6	6	2
2	(Australia) Jack Crawford (Australia) Jim Willard	6	8	3	6	^{[a]}

Semifinals
3	(Australia) Ian McInnes (Australia) Pat O'Hara Wood	6	6	6
2	(Australia) Jack Crawford (Australia) Jim Willard	4	3	0

== Notes ==
- ^{a} Some sources give 6–2 as a result of the third set.
- ^{b} Also spelled T. Grinstead.
