= 1930 Australian Championships – Men's doubles =

Men's doubles
- 1930 Australian Championships

Final
- Champions: (Australia) Jack Crawford (Australia) Harry Hopman
- Runners-up: (Australia) Tim Fitchett (Australia) Jack Hawkes
- Score: 8–6, 6–1, 2–6, 6–3

Details
- Draw: 16(6 Q )
- Seeds: 4

Events
Singles	men	women		boys	girls
Doubles	men	women	mixed	boys	girls
← 1929 ·	Australian Championships	· 1931 →

The first-seeds Jack Crawford and Harry Hopman successfully defended their title by defeating Tim Fitchett and Jack Hawkes 8–6, 6–1, 2–6, 6–3 in the final, to win the men's doubles tennis title at the 1930 Australian Championships.

== Seeds ==
1. (Australia) Jack Crawford / (Australia) Harry Hopman (champions)
2. ( (Australia) Tim Fitchett / (Australia) Jack Hawkes) (final) (Note: Originally the second seeds were Jack Hawkes and Pat O'Hara Wood but the latter withdrew. It's unclear whether Hawkes with a new partner had retained this seed.)
3. (Australia) Ray Dunlop / (Australia) Jim Willard (semifinals)
4. (Australia) Jack Cummings / (Australia) Gar Moon (semifinals)

== Draw ==
=== Key ===
- Q = Qualifier
- WC = Wild card
- LL = Lucky loser
- Alt = Alternate
- ITF = ITF entry
- PR = Protected ranking
- SR = Special ranking
- SE = Special exempt
- JE = Junior exempt
- JR = Junior Accelerator Programme entrant
- CO = College Accelerator Programme entrant
- NG = Next Gen Accelerator Program entrant
- w/o = Walkover
- r = Retired
- d = Defaulted

=== Draw ===
First round
1	(Australia) Jack Crawford (Australia) Harry Hopman	6	6	6
Q	(Australia) Ron Ford (Australia) Bill Halliday	2	3	3
(Australia) Alan Coldham (Australia) Harry Hassett	3	1	6	6	6
(Australia) Horace Crebbin (Australia) Hector Wallace	6	6	3	3	3
(Australia) Jack Clemenger (Australia) Bob Schlesinger	6	6	6
Q	(Australia) Max Carpenter (Australia) Bill Simpson	2	2	3
4	(Australia) Jack Cummings (Australia) Gar Moon	6	6	6
Q	(Australia) Gemmell Payne (Australia) George Thomas	1	2	2
3	(Australia) Ray Dunlop (Australia) Jim Willard	7	9	6	6
Q	(Australia) Vic Beament (Australia) Gerald Gaffy	9	7	1	1
(Australia) Ron Hone (Australia) Don Turnbull	4	3	7	6	6
(Australia) Clifford Sproule (Australia) Norman Peach	6	6	5	4	4
Q	(Australia) Dave Thompson (Australia) Bruce Walker	6	3	3	6	6
(Australia) Frank Peach (Australia) Ernest Rowe	4	6	6	3	0
(2)	(Australia) Tim Fitchett (Australia) Jack Hawkes	1	6	6	6
Q	(Australia) Max Noble (Australia) Tom Trigg	6	1	0	1

Quarterfinals
1	(Australia) Jack Crawford (Australia) Harry Hopman	6	6	7
(Australia) Alan Coldham (Australia) Harry Hassett	1	2	5
(Australia) Jack Clemenger (Australia) Bob Schlesinger	3	4	6	3
4	(Australia) Jack Cummings (Australia) Gar Moon	6	6	1	6
3	(Australia) Ray Dunlop (Australia) Jim Willard	9	6	6
(Australia) Ron Hone (Australia) Don Turnbull	7	3	3
Q	(Australia) Dave Thompson (Australia) Bruce Walker	2	4	6	4
(2)	(Australia) Tim Fitchett (Australia) Jack Hawkes	6	6	4	6

Semifinals
1	(Australia) Jack Crawford (Australia) Harry Hopman	6	6	6
4	(Australia) Jack Cummings (Australia) Gar Moon	2	1	4
3	(Australia) Ray Dunlop (Australia) Jim Willard	1	4	6	3
(2)	(Australia) Tim Fitchett (Australia) Jack Hawkes	6	6	3	6

Final
1	(Australia) Jack Crawford (Australia) Harry Hopman	8	6	2	6
(2)	(Australia) Tim Fitchett (Australia) Jack Hawkes	6	1	6	3

== Eliminating round ==
In order to eliminate byes the council of L.T.A.A. decided that in case of events for which there were more than the number of entries acceptable, a preliminary elimination tournament should be played.

Eliminating matches were played on Saturday, 18 January:

- (Australia) Ron Ford / (Australia) Bill Halliday d. (Australia) J. S. D. Sweeting / (Australia) Norman Mussen 7–5, 6–3, 6–2
- (Australia) Max Carpenter / (Australia) Bill Simpson d. (Australia) Alfred Chave / (Australia) John Grinstead 7–5, 7–5, 7–5
- (Australia) Gemmell Payne / (Australia) George Thomas d. (Australia) Keith Dalgleish / (Australia) Angus Smith 4–6, 6–3, 9–11, 6–4, 6–3
- (Australia) Vic Beament / (Australia) Gerald Gaffy d. (Australia) Allan Knight / (Australia) Adrian Quist 6–2, 6–1, 6–4
- (Australia) Dave Thompson / (Australia) Bruce Walker d. (Australia) Charles Buckley / (Australia) Thomas Robinson 6–0, 8–6, 6–1
- (Australia) Max Noble / (Australia) Tom Trigg d. (Australia) Cec Cranfield / (Australia) Harold Doctor 2–6, 7–5, 6–4, 4–6, 6–4
