= 1930 Australian Championships – Men's singles =

Men's singles
- 1930 Australian Championships

Final
- Champion: (Australia) Gar Moon
- Runner-up: (Australia) Harry Hopman
- Score: 6–3, 6–1, 6–3

Details
- Draw: 32(11Q)
- Seeds: 8

Events
Singles	men	women		boys	girls
Doubles	men	women	mixed	boys	girls
- Australian Championships

Gar Moon defeated Harry Hopman 6–3, 6–1, 6–3 in the final to win the men's singles tennis title at the 1930 Australian Championships.

== Seeds ==
The seeded players are listed below. Gar Moon is the champion; others show the round in which they were eliminated.

1. (Australia) Jack Crawford (semifinals)
2. (Australia) Harry Hopman (finalist)
3. (Australia) Gar Moon (champion)
4. (Australia) Jim Willard (semifinals)
5. (Australia) Jack Cummings (quarterfinals)
6. (Australia) Bob Schlesinger (quarterfinals)
7. (Australia) Jack Hawkes (second round)
8. (Australia) Clifford Sproule (quarterfinals)

== Draw ==
=== Key ===
- Q = Qualifier
- WC = Wild card
- LL = Lucky loser
- r = Retired

=== Finals ===
Quarterfinals
2	(Australia) Harry Hopman	4	6	3	7	6
(Australia) Jack Clemenger	6	2	6	5	3
4	(Australia) Jim Willard	2	6	10	6
6	(Australia) Bob Schlesinger	6	1	8	2
1	(Australia) Jack Crawford	6	6	6
8	(Australia) Clifford Sproule	3	2	1
3	(Australia) Gar Moon	6	6	6
5	(Australia) Jack Cummings	4	2	2

Semifinals
2	(Australia) Harry Hopman	6	6	6
4	(Australia) Jim Willard	4	2	0
1	(Australia) Jack Crawford	5	4	6	3
3	(Australia) Gar Moon	7	6	4	6

Final
2	(Australia) Harry Hopman	3	1	3
3	(Australia) Gar Moon	6	6	6

=== Earlier rounds ===
==== Section 1 ====
First round
2	(Australia) Hopman	6	6	6
(Australia) Chave	3	2	2
Q	(Australia) Noble	2	2	1
(Australia) Hassett	6	6	6
7	(Australia) Hawkes	11	4	2
(Australia) Coldham	13	6	6
Q	(Australia) Fitchett	5	1	1
(Australia) Clemenger	7	6	6
4	(Australia) J. Willard	6	6	9
(Australia) Ford	0	3	7
Q	(Australia) Tonkin	3	2	6	3
(Australia) Turnbull	6	6	3	6
6	(Australia) Schlesinger	6	6	6
(Australia) Peach	3	2	2
Q	(Australia) McCracken	2	4	6	6	5
Q	(Australia) Walker	6	6	3	1	7

Second round
2	(Australia) Hopman	6	11	6	4	6
(Australia) Hassett	1	13	1	6	3
(Australia) Coldham	0	2	4
(Australia) Clemenger	6	6	6
4	(Australia) J. Willard	6	1	4	6	6
(Australia) Turnbull	2	6	6	2	1
6	(Australia) Schlesinger	6	9	10
Q	(Australia) Walker	3	7	8

Quarterfinals
2	(Australia) Hopman	4	6	3	7	6
(Australia) Clemenger	6	2	6	5	3
4	(Australia) J. Willard	2	6	10	6
6	(Australia) Schlesinger	6	1	8	2

Semifinals
2	(Australia) Hopman	6	6	6
4	(Australia) J. Willard	4	2	0

==== Section 2 ====
First round
1	(Australia) Crawford	6	6	8
Q	(Australia) Thompson	2	2	6
Q	(Australia) Doctor	3	3	4
(Australia) Rowe	6	6	6
8	(Australia) Sproule	6	6	7
Q	(Australia) Grinstead	1	2	5
Q	(Australia) Payne	7	4	6	6
(Australia) Wallace	5	6	2	1
3	(Australia) Moon	3	6	6	6
(Australia) Robinson	6	0	2	4
(Note: All contemporary sources call this encounter (played on January 18) an elimination match.)	(Australia) Sweeting	7	9	8
(Australia) Cranfield	5	7	6
5	(Australia) Cummings	8	6	6
(Australia) Dunlop	6	2	4
Q	(Australia) Beament	6	3	7	2
Q	(Australia) A. Smith	4	6	9	6

Second round
1	(Australia) Crawford	6	6	3	6
(Australia) Rowe	4	2	6	2
8	(Australia) Sproule	6	6	6
Q	(Australia) Payne	2	2	2
3	(Australia) Moon	6	6	6
(Australia) Sweeting	2	3	1
5	(Australia) Cummings	9	7	6
Q	(Australia) A. Smith	7	5	2

Quarterfinals
1	(Australia) Crawford	6	6	6
8	(Australia) Sproule	3	2	1
3	(Australia) Moon	6	6	6
5	(Australia) Cummings	4	2	2

Semifinals
1	(Australia) Crawford	5	4	6	3
3	(Australia) Moon	7	6	4	6

== Eliminating round ==
In order to eliminate byes the council of L.T.A.A. decided that in case of events for which there were more than the number of entries acceptable, a preliminary elimination tournament should be played.

Eliminating matches were played on Saturday, 18 January:

- (Australia) Max Noble d. (Australia) Adrian Quist 7–5, 5–7, 8–6, 6–4
- (Australia) Basil Fitchett d. (Australia) George Thomas 6–0, 6–4, 6–2
- (Australia) Bert Tonkin d. (Australia) Jack Busst 6–0, 6–4, 6–8, 7–5
- (Australia) F. McCracken d. (Australia) Allan Knight 6–2, 6–3, 4–6, 6–1
- (Australia) Bruce Walker d. (Australia) Horace Crebbin 7–5, 9–7, 6–3
- (Australia) Dave Thompson d. (Australia) Bill Halliday 6–3, 6–2, 6–4
- (Australia) Harold Doctor d. (Australia) Gerald Gaffy w/o
- (Australia) John Grinstead d. (Australia) Bill Simpson 6–1, 6–2, 4–6, 6–3
- (Australia) Gemmell Payne d. (Australia) Max Carpenter 6–4, 4–6, 6–3, 6–4
- (Australia) Vic Beament d. (Australia) Keith Dalgleish 7–5, 8–6, 6–2
- (Australia) Angus Smith d. (Australia) Norman Mussen 6–4, 5–7, 5–7, 6–4, 8–6
- ( (Australia) J. S. D. Sweeting d. (Australia) Cec Cranfield 7–5, 9–7, 8–6)

== Notes ==
Preceded by 1929 U.S. National Championships	Grand Slam men's singles	Succeeded by 1930 French Championships
