= 1927 Australian Championships – Mixed doubles =

Mixed doubles
- 1927 Australian Championships

Final
- Champions: (Australia) Esna Boyd (Australia) Jack Hawkes
- Runners-up: (Australia) Youtha Anthony (Australia) Jim Willard
- Score: 6–1, 6–3

Details
- Draw: 22
- Seeds: 4

Events
Singles	men	women		boys	girls
Doubles	men	women	mixed	boys	girls
- Australian Championships

Esna Boyd and Jack Hawkes successfully defended their title by defeating Youtha Anthony and Jim Willard 6–1, 6–3 in the final, to win the mixed doubles tennis title at the 1927 Australian Championships.

== Seeds ==
1. (Australia) Esna Boyd / (Australia) Jack Hawkes (champions)
2. (Australia) Youtha Anthony ^{[a]}/ (Australia) Jim Willard (final)
3. (Australia) Sylvia Harper / (Australia) Rupert Wertheim (semifinals)
4. (Australia) Louie Bickerton / (Australia) Bob Schlesinger (second round)

== Draw ==
Key

- Q = Qualifier
- WC = Wild card
- LL = Lucky loser
- Alt = Alternate
- ITF = ITF entry
- PR = Protected ranking
- SR = Special ranking
- SE = Special exempt
- JE = Junior exempt
- JR = Junior Accelerator Programme entrant
- CO = College Accelerator Programme entrant
- NG = Next Gen Accelerator Program entrant
- w/o = Walkover
- r = Retired
- d = Defaulted

=== Finals ===
Quarterfinals
2	(Australia) Youtha Anthony (Australia) Jim Willard	w/o
(Australia) N. Webb ^{[b]} (Australia) Spencer Millear
(Australia) Marjorie Cox (Australia) Jack Crawford	6	6
(Australia) Dorothy Weston (Australia) Ron Hone	1	2
3	(Australia) Sylvia Harper (Australia) Rupert Wertheim	6	6
(Australia) Kathleen Le Messurier (Australia) W. R. James	4	4
(Australia) Gladys Toyne (Australia) Gordon Lum	6	4
1	(Australia) Esna Boyd (Australia) Jack Hawkes	8	6

Semifinals
2	(Australia) Youtha Anthony (Australia) Jim Willard	6	6
(Australia) Marjorie Cox (Australia) Jack Crawford	4	4
3	(Australia) Sylvia Harper (Australia) Rupert Wertheim	6	2	4
1	(Australia) Esna Boyd (Australia) Jack Hawkes	4	6	6

Final
2	(Australia) Youtha Anthony (Australia) Jim Willard	1	3
1	(Australia) Esna Boyd (Australia) Jack Hawkes	6	6

=== Earlier rounds ===
==== Section 1 ====
First round
(Australia) Mavis McKay (Australia) Thomas Robinson	6	6
(Australia) Frances Hoddle-Wrigley (Australia) Harry Jacoby	3	2
(Australia) Marjorie Cox (Australia) Jack Crawford	2	6	6
(Australia) Keyden Irving (Australia) Harold Wilson	6	1	2
(Australia) Dorothy Weston (Australia) Ron Hone	6	6
(Australia) Mildred McDougall (Australia) Rice Gemmell	3	3

Second round
2	(Australia) Youtha Anthony (Australia) Jim Willard	6	6
(Australia) Dorothy Bellamy (Australia) Cecil Lamb	2	4
(Australia) N. Webb ^{[b]} (Australia) Spencer Millear	1	6	6
(Australia) Floris St. George (Australia) Rupert Shepherd	6	4	4
(Australia) Mavis McKay (Australia) Thomas Robinson	2	6	3
(Australia) Marjorie Cox (Australia) Jack Crawford	6	2	6
(Australia) Dorothy Weston (Australia) Ron Hone	7	2	7
4	(Australia) Louie Bickerton (Australia) Bob Schlesinger	5	6	5

Quarterfinals
2	(Australia) Youtha Anthony (Australia) Jim Willard	w/o
(Australia) N. Webb ^{[b]} (Australia) Spencer Millear
(Australia) Marjorie Cox (Australia) Jack Crawford	6	6
(Australia) Dorothy Weston (Australia) Ron Hone	1	2

Semifinals
2	(Australia) Youtha Anthony (Australia) Jim Willard	6	6
(Australia) Marjorie Cox (Australia) Jack Crawford	4	4

==== Section 2 ====
First round
(Australia) Beryl Turner (Australia) Gar Moon	4	6	6
(Australia) Ruth Stephens (Australia) Harry Hopman	6	3	2
(Australia) Vere de Bavay (Australia) Rodney Heath	6	6	6
(Australia) Minnie Richardson (Australia) D'Arcy Mullamphy	8	2	4
1	(Australia) Esna Boyd (Australia) Jack Hawkes	6	6
(Australia) Lily Addison (Australia) Norman Roberts	1	2

Second round
3	(Australia) Sylvia Harper (Australia) Rupert Wertheim	6	6
(Australia) Ursula Bere (Australia) E. D. Yencken	4	1
(Australia) Kathleen Le Messurier (Australia) W. R. James	6	6
(Australia) Mrs. Rowe ^{[c]} (Australia) Ron Ford	4	3
(Australia) Gladys Toyne (Australia) Gordon Lum	6	15
(Australia) Beryl Turner (Australia) Gar Moon	4	13
(Australia) Vere de Bavay (Australia) Rodney Heath	4	1
1	(Australia) Esna Boyd (Australia) Jack Hawkes	6	6

Quarterfinals
3	(Australia) Sylvia Harper (Australia) Rupert Wertheim	6	6
(Australia) Kathleen Le Messurier (Australia) W. R. James	4	4
(Australia) Gladys Toyne (Australia) Gordon Lum	6	4
1	(Australia) Esna Boyd (Australia) Jack Hawkes	8	6

Semifinals
3	(Australia) Sylvia Harper (Australia) Rupert Wertheim	6	2	4
1	(Australia) Esna Boyd (Australia) Jack Hawkes	4	6	6

== Notes ==
- ^{a} Original pairing was J. Willard with Daphne Akhurst, but the latter had to withdraw owing to illness.
- ^{b} Most likely either Nell Webb or Nancy Webb.
- ^{c} Probably Mrs. W. T. Rowe (Flora Rowe).
- 1R Turner/Moon vs. Stephens/Hopman: some sources give 4–6, 6–3, 6–4.
- 2R Anthony/Willard vs. Bellamy/Lamb: some sources give 6–2, 6–1.
- QF Harper/Wertheim vs. Le Messurier/James: some sources give 6–2, 6–4.
