= Tasmanian Open (tennis) =

Defunct tennis tournament
- Tour: ILTF (1913-1980)
- Founded: 1893; 133 years ago
- Abolished: 1985; 41 years ago
- Location: Launceston & Hobart, Australia
- Surface: Clay / Grass / Hard

The Tasmanian Open or Tasmanian Open Championships was a men's and women's international tennis tournament founded in 1893 as the Tasmanian Lawn Tennis Championships. or Tasmanian Championships It was first played Launceston Lawn Tennis Club, Launceston Hobart, Tasmania, Australia. It remained part of the international tennis circuit until 1980.

== History ==
In 1893 Tasmanian Lawn Tennis Championships were established Launceston Lawn Tennis Club, Launceston, Tasmania, Australia. The men's tournament was played on grass courts except for the years 1940, 1941 when it was played on clay courts, and 1971–72, 1974, 1978 and 1980 when it was played on hard courts. The women's tournament was played exclusively on hard asphalt courts outdoors until 1935, then switched to clay courts until 1980. For the years 1940 '48 '51 '55 '60 '64 the tournament was valid as Australian Hard Court Championships. It was an annual featured event on the international tennis circuit till 1980.

In 1994 a new women's event was revived called the Tasmanian International Open, held in Hobart, Australia. Since 2014 it has been known as the Hobart International and still played today.

== Location ==
The championships alternated between Launceston and Hobart, Tasmania, Australia, but was not staged sequentially.

== Finals ==
=== Men's singles ===
Year	Champion	Runner-up	Score
1893	(Australia) Arthur Miller	(United Kingdom) Aubrey Caldecott	6–5, 5–6, 6–4
1894	(Australia) Kenric Laughton	(United Kingdom) Aubrey Caldecott	6–4, 5–6, 6–3
1896	(Australia) Frank Dodds	(Australia) John Dodds	w/o
1897	(Australia) Kenric Laughton	(Australia) Frank Dodds	6–3, 3–6, 6–4
1898	(Australia) Percy Miller	(Australia) James Rule	6–3, 6–2
1899	(Australia) Percy Miller	(Australia) Howard Giblin	6–4, 6–1
1900	(Australia) James McGough	(Australia) Leslie Morgan	6–0, 2–6, 8–6
1901	(Australia) Edgar Barnard	(Australia) James McGough	6–4, 0–6, 6–4
1902	(Australia) James McGough	(Australia) Leslie Morgan	6–2, 3–6, 6–1
1903	(Australia) James McGough	(Australia) E. R. Burgess	6–0, 6–2, 6–3
1904	(New Zealand) Harry Parker	(Australia) James McGough	6–0, 6–0, 6–0
1905	(Australia) James McGough	(United States) Lewis R. Freeman	6–1, 6–1, 6–0
1906	(Australia) James McGough	(Australia) Frederick Ratten	7–5, 16–14, 6–2
1907	(Australia) James McGough	(Australia) Frederick Ratten	6–1, 8–6, 8–6
1908	(Australia) James McGough	(Australia) Dr. Sweetman	6–2, 6–3, 6–1
1909	(Australia) Thomas Barnard	(Australia) Frederick Raynor	6–4, 6–2, 0–6, 6–2
1910	(Australia) James McGough	(Australia) Thomas Newton	6–1, 6–1, 6–1
1911	(New Zealand) Harry Parker	(Australia) Harold Hunt	6–3, 6–4, 4–6, 6–2
1912	(Australia) James McGough	(Australia) Sydney Dickenson	6–2, 6–2, 6–3
1913	(Australia) James McGough	(Australia) Frederick Down	6–3, 6–4, 6–2
1914	(Australia) James McGough	(Australia) James Hudson	6–1, 6–3, 6–0
1915	(Australia) Harry Lewis-Barclay	(Australia) James McGough	7–5, 6–1, 6–1
1916	(Australia) Horace Rice	(Australia) James McGough	6–4, 2–6, 6–3, 3–6, 6–3
1917	(Australia) Samuel England	(Australia) William Sheehan	6–3, 6–2, 6–3
1918	(Australia) James Hudson	(Australia) Roy Crawford	8–6, 6–4, 6–0
1919	(Australia) James McGough	(Australia) William Sheehan	w/o
1920	(Australia) James McGough	(Australia) Roy Crawford	6–0, 6–2, 6–2
1921	(Australia) William Sheehan	(Australia) Robert Berriman	6–4, 6–4, 6–4
1922	(Australia) Walter Stephens	(Australia) Roy Crawford	6–2, 6–3, 6–2
1923	(Australia) William Sheehan	(Australia) Donald Ferguson	3–6, 6–2, 6–2, 6–0
1924	(Australia) Alan Newton	(Australia) William Sheehan	6–2, 6–0, 6–3
1925	(Australia) Alan Newton	(Australia) Stanley Trethewey	6–2, 6–1, 6–0
1926	(Australia) D'Arcy Mullamphy	(Australia) Gordon Hughes	6–4, 6–2, 6–0
1927	(Australia) Vivian Page	(Australia) D'Arcy Mullamphy	5–7, 6–3, 3–6, 6–4, 6–3
1928	(Australia) Vivian Page	(Australia) Cecil Stuart	6–0, 6–1, 6–1
1929	(Australia) Vivian Page	(Australia) Eric Huxley	6–2, 6–1, 6–0
1930	(Australia) Sir Allan Knight	(Australia) Alan Newton	6–3, 8–6, 6–2
1931	(Australia) Sir Allan Knight	(Australia) Alan Newton	4–6, 6–1, 6–1, 6–4
1932	(Australia) Sir Allan Knight	(Australia) Norman Little	6–0, 6–4, 6–0
1933	(Australia) Sir Allan Knight	(Australia) Alan Newton	6–2, 6–1, 6–0
1934	(Australia) Reg Ewin	(Australia) Sir Allan Knight	6–2, 8–6, 6–3
1935	(Australia) Reg Ewin	(Australia) Sir Allan Knight	6–0, 6–2, 6–0
1936	(Australia) Roy Harrison	(Australia) Donald Lovett	7–5, 2–6, 6–4, 6–2
1937	(Australia) Len Schwartz	(Australia) Lionel Brodie	6–4, 7–5, 6–3
1938	(Australia) Donald Lovett	(Australia) George Holland	2–6, 2–6, 6–4, 6–3, 6–3
1939	(Australia) Lionel Brodie	(Australia) Jack Harper	6–4, 6–2, 6–1
1940	(Australia) John Bromwich	(Australia) Jack Crawford	6–1, 4–6, 6–2, 6–2
1941-45	No competition		
1946	(Australia) John Bromwich	(Australia) Lionel Brodie	6–1, 6–2, 6–3
1947	(Australia) Adrian Quist	(Australia) Jack Crawford	6–2, 6–1, 6–1
1948	(Australia) Adrian Quist	(Australia) Bill Sidwell	6–2, 6–1, 7–5
1949	(Australia) Colin Long	(Australia) Adrian Quist	6–3, 7–5, 4–6, 3–6, 6–3
1950	(Australia) John Bromwich	(Australia) Don Candy	0–6, 6–3, 3–6, 6–3, 6–0
1951	(Australia) Frank Sedgman	(Australia) Don Candy	6–3, 6–2, 6–2
1952	(Australia) Ken McGregor	(Australia) Neale Fraser	6–4, 6–3, 6–4
1953	(Australia) Eric Stewart	(Australia) Neale Fraser	6–2, 5–7, 6–3, 4–6, 6–2
1954	(Australia) Don Candy	(Australia) Mervyn Rose	6–4, 6–2, 3–6, 6–4
1956	(Australia) Neale Fraser	(Australia) Don Candy	2–6, 6–2, 6–3, 4–6, 6–1
1957	(Australia) Ashley Cooper	(Australia) Geoff Brown	6–4, 6–3
1959	(Australia) Bob Mark	(Australia) Roy Emerson	6–4, 7–5, 6–2
1961	(Australia) Brian Tobin	(Australia) Geoff Pollard	6–4, 6–1, 6–1
1962	(Australia) Rod Laver	(Australia) Neale Fraser	7–5, 0–6, 0–6, 6–1, 6–2
1963	(Australia) Martin Mulligan	(Australia) John Newcombe	7–5, 6–2
1965	(Australia) John Newcombe	(Australia) Owen Davidson	6–4, 5–7, 6–3, 6–3
1966	(United States) Arthur Ashe	(Australia) John Newcombe	6–4, 6–4, 12-10
1967	(Australia) Tony Roche	(United States) Arthur Ashe	9-7, 1–6, 6–2, 8–6
1968	(Australia) Ray Ruffels	(United Kingdom) Graham Stilwell	3–6, 6–8, 7–5, 7–5, 6–2
1969	(Australia) Fred Stolle	(Australia) Tony Roche	6–3, 0–6, 6–4, 6–1
1970	(United States) Jim McManus	(Australia) Bob Carmichael	7–5, 6–4, 6–1
1971	(Soviet Union) Alex Metreveli	(Australia) John Alexander	7–6, 6–3, 4–6, 6–3
1972	(Soviet Union) Alex Metreveli	(France) Wanaro N'Godrella	6–2, 6–4, 6–3
1973	(Australia) Colin Dibley	(India) Jasjit Singh	7–6, 6–2
1974	(Australia) Geoff Masters	(Japan) Toshiro Sakai	6–4, 7–6
1975	(Australia) Mark Edmondson	(Australia) Cliff Letcher	6–2, 6–7, 6–4
1977	(Australia) Syd Ball	(Australia) Bob Carmichael	6–2, 4–6, 6–2
1978	(Australia) Bob Carmichael	(Australia) John Marks	4–6, 6–3, 6–4
1980	(Australia) David Whyte	(Australia) Ernie Ewert	4–6, 6–2, 7–6
1984	(Australia) David MacPherson	(Australia) Mike Lynch	6–3, 6–3
1985	(Australia) Richard Fromberg	(Australia) David Tunbridge	6–1, 5–7, 6–2
