= 1926 Australasian Championships =

- Date: 24 January – 30 January 1926
- Edition: 19th
- Category: Grand Slam (ITF)
- Surface: Grass
- Location: Adelaide, South Australia, Australia
- Venue: Memorial Drive

Champions

Men's singles
- (Australia) Jack Hawkes

Women's singles
- (Australia) Daphne Akhurst

Men's doubles
- (Australia) Jack Hawkes / (Australia) Gerald Patterson

Women's doubles
- (Australia) Esna Boyd / (Australia) Meryl O'Hara Wood

Mixed doubles
- (Australia) Esna Boyd / (Australia) Jack Hawkes

Boys' singles
- (Australia) Jack Crawford

Boys' doubles
- (Australia) Jack Crawford / (Australia) Harry Hopman
- Australasian Championships

The 1926 Australasian Championships (now known as the Australian Open) was a tennis tournament that took place on outdoor Grass courts at the Memorial Drive, Adelaide, Australia from 24 January to 30 January. It was the 19th edition of the Australasian Championships, the 3rd held in Adelaide, and the first Grand Slam tournament of the year. The singles titles were won by Australians Jack Hawkes and Daphne Akhurst. 1926 was the last year the tournament would be called "Australasian Championships".

== Finals ==
=== Men's singles ===
(Australia) Jack Hawkes defeated (Australia) Jim Willard 6–1, 6–3, 6–1

=== Women's singles ===
(Australia) Daphne Akhurst defeated (Australia) Esna Boyd 6–1, 6–3

=== Men's doubles ===
(Australia) Jack Hawkes / (Australia) Gerald Patterson defeated (Australia) James Anderson / (Australia) Pat O'Hara Wood 6–1, 6–4, 6–2

=== Women's doubles ===
(Australia) Esna Boyd / (Australia) Meryl O'Hara Wood defeated (Australia) Daphne Akhurst / (Australia) Marjorie Cox 6–3, 6–8, 8–6

=== Mixed doubles ===
(Australia) Esna Boyd / (Australia) Jack Hawkes defeated (Australia) Daphne Akhurst / (Australia) Jim Willard 6–2, 6–4

Preceded by 1925 U.S. National Championships	Grand Slams	Succeeded by 1926 French Championships
