= Léonce Aslangul =

French tennis player

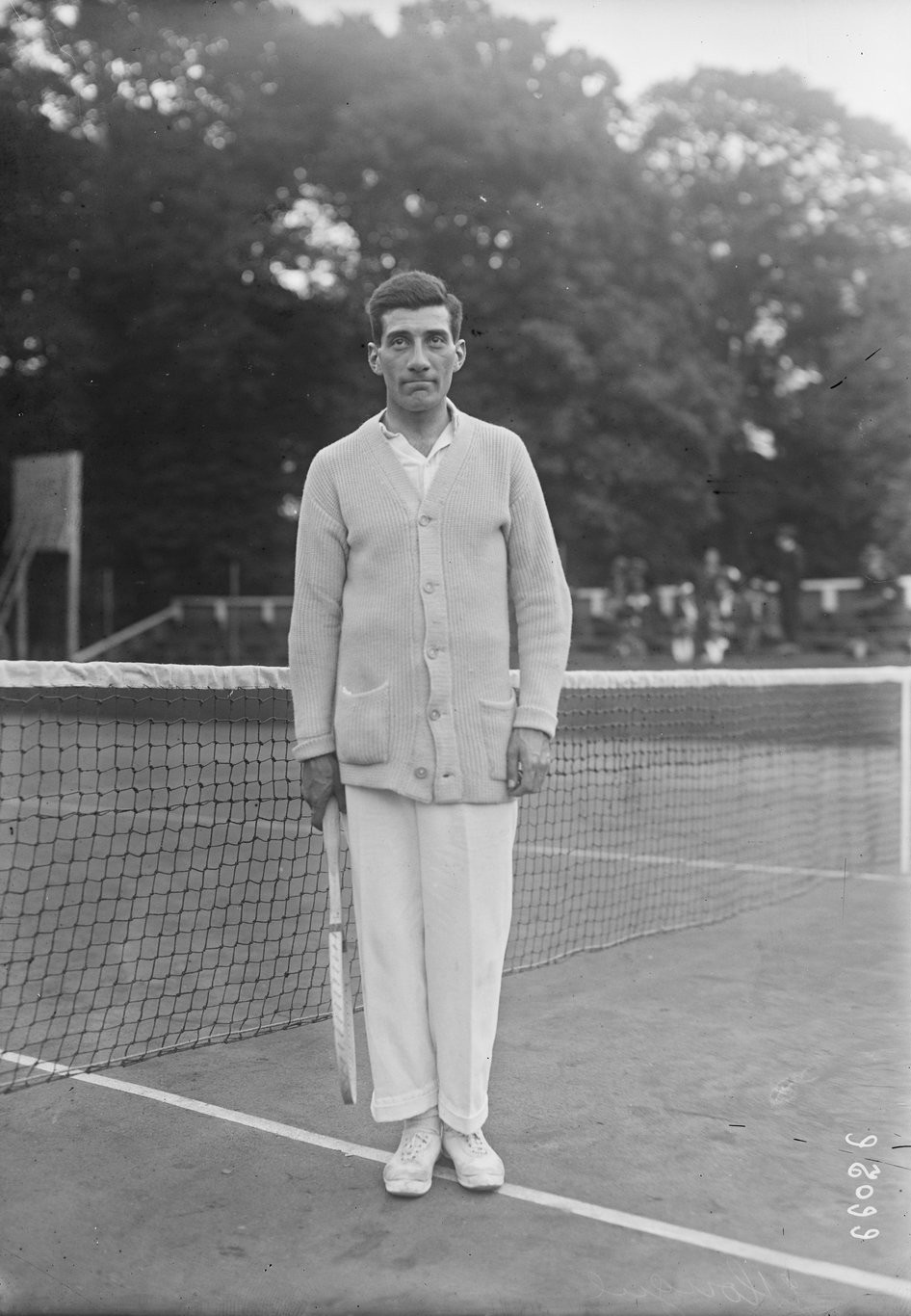
- Full name: Léonce Jacques Aslangul
- Country (sports): France
- Born: 27 October 1898; Paris, France
- Died: 19 November 1939 (aged 41); Paris, France

Singles

Grand Slam singles results
- Australian Open: 3R (1927)
- French Open: 4R (1926, 1930)
- Wimbledon: 2R (1926)

Doubles

Grand Slam doubles results
- Australian Open: SF (1927)
- Wimbledon: QF (1926)

Léonce Jacques Aslangul (27 October 1898 – 19 November 1939) was a French tennis player of Armenian descent active on tour in the 1920s and 1930s. He was also a French national champion in the sport of squash.

Born in Paris, Aslangul was the son of a French-Armenian merchant. He twice reached the singles fourth round of the French Championships. As a doubles player he was a finalist at the 1923 World Hard Court Championships, quarter-finalist at the 1926 Wimbledon Championships and semi-finalist at the 1927 Australian Championships.

Aslangul's wife Nena, an Australian, was the daughter of wealthy Greek-born Melbourne businessman Antony J. Lucas. Soon after Aslangul died in 1939, Nena and their two children fled occupied France and settled in Australia. Their son Tony skied for Australia at the 1956 Winter Olympics, while daughter June was a model.
