= 1926 Australasian Championships – Men's singles =

Men's singles
- 1926 Australasian Championships

Final
- Champion: (Australia) Jack Hawkes
- Runner-up: (Australia) Jim Willard
- Score: 6–1, 6–3, 6–1

Details
- Seeds: 8

Events
Singles	men	women		boys	girls
Doubles	men	women	mixed	boys	girls
- Australasian Championships

Jack Hawkes defeated Jim Willard 6–1, 6–3, 6–1 in the final to win the men's singles tennis title at the 1926 Australasian Championships.

== Seeds ==
The seeded players are listed below. John Hawkes is the champion; others show the round in which they were eliminated.

1. (Australia) James Anderson (semifinals)
2. (Australia) Gerald Patterson (first round)
3. (Australia) Bob Schlesinger (semifinals)
4. (Australia) Jack Hawkes (champion)
5. (Australia) Pat O'Hara Wood (quarterfinals)
6. (Australia) Norman Peach (quarterfinals)
7. (Australia) Gar Hone (quarterfinals)
8. (Australia) Jim Willard (finalist)

== Draw ==
=== Key ===
- Q = Qualifier
- WC = Wild card
- LL = Lucky loser
- r = Retired

=== Finals ===
Quarterfinals
1	(Australia) James Anderson	6	6	3	6
5	(Australia) Pat O'Hara Wood	3	2	6	2
4	(Australia) Jack Hawkes	4	6	6	6
7	(Australia) Gar Hone	6	0	2	2
(Australia) Ernest Rowe	3	1	6	1
8	(Australia) Jim Willard	6	6	0	6
3	(Australia) Bob Schlesinger	6	6	5	6
6	(Australia) Norman Peach	4	1	7	3

Semifinals
1	(Australia) James Anderson	8	5	3	4
4	(Australia) Jack Hawkes	6	7	6	6
8	(Australia) Jim Willard	3	6	6	6
3	(Australia) Bob Schlesinger	6	3	0	4

Final
4	(Australia) Jack Hawkes	6	6	6
8	(Australia) Jim Willard	1	3	1

=== Earlier rounds ===
==== Section 1 ====
First round

Second round
1	(Australia) Anderson	6	6	6
(Australia) L. Collins	0	0	0
(Australia) Gemmell	6	6	6
(Australia) M. Fogarty	1	0	2
5	(Australia) O'Hara Wood	6	6	7
(Australia) Coldham	1	2	5
(Australia) Cameron	6	6	6
(Australia) D. Smith	1	2	4

Third round
1	(Australia) Anderson	6	6	6	7
(Australia) Gemmell	8	3	0	5
5	(Australia) O'Hara Wood	6	6	7
(Australia) Cameron	1	2	5

Quarterfinals
1	(Australia) Anderson	6	6	3	6
5	(Australia) O'Hara Wood	3	2	6	2

==== Section 2 ====
First round
(Australia) James	3	6	6	6
(Australia) L. Fogarty	6	2	1	2
7	(Australia) G. Hone	6	11	6
(Australia) Sproule	4	9	2
(Australia) B. Fitchett	2	6	6	6
(Australia) Chave	6	1	1	4
(Australia) Sherwood	7	6	8
(Australia) Harvey	5	1	6
(Australia) Nott	6	3	6	5	6
(Australia) Newton	1	6	4	7	1

Second round
4	(Australia) Hawkes	6	6	6
(Australia) Ford	3	0	2
(Australia) Fotheringham	10	6	6
(Australia) James	8	3	4
7	(Australia) G. Hone	7	6	6
(Australia) B. Fitchett	5	2	2
(Australia) Sherwood	9	5	3
(Australia) Nott	11	7	6

Third round
4	(Australia) Hawkes	6	6	6
(Australia) Fotheringham	3	0	0
7	(Australia) G. Hone	6	6	6	6
(Australia) Nott	2	2	8	1

Quarterfinals
4	(Australia) Hawkes	4	6	6	6
7	(Australia) G. Hone	6	0	2	2

==== Section 3 ====
First round
(Australia) Moon	6	5	7	6	6
2	(Australia) Patterson	8	7	5	4	3
(Australia) Berriman	6	6	6
(Australia) Barnard	4	2	3
(Australia) Rowe	6	8	4	3	6
(Australia) Lum	3	6	6	6	1
(Australia) Wertheim	6	6	6
(Australia) Turner	2	0	4
8	(Australia) J. Willard	6	6	6
(Australia) Crawford	1	2	2
(Australia) R. Hone	6	8	6
(Australia) W. Smith	4	6	1

Second round
(Australia) Moon	6	6	6
(Australia) Berriman	4	2	4
(Australia) Rowe	7	6	6
(Australia) Wertheim	5	3	1
8	(Australia) J. Willard	6	6	6
(Australia) R. Hone	1	0	1
(Australia) Hooper	2	7	6	4	7
(Australia) Halliday	6	5	1	6	5

Third round
(Australia) Moon	6	3	6	5	1
(Australia) Rowe	0	6	2	7	6
8	(Australia) J. Willard	6	6	6
(Australia) Hooper	1	4	4

Quarterfinals
(Australia) Rowe	3	1	6	1
8	(Australia) J. Willard	6	6	0	6

==== Section 4 ====
First round

Second round
3	(Australia) Schlesinger	6	8	6
(Australia) Richmond	1	6	1
(Australia) Mellish	6	6	6
(Australia) A. Collins	0	0	3
6	(Australia) Peach	6	6	7
(Australia) A. Treloar	4	4	5
(Australia) Hopman	6	6	6
(Australia) Lamb	4	2	4

Third round
3	(Australia) Schlesinger	6	6	2	6
(Australia) Mellish	3	3	6	2
6	(Australia) Peach	7	6	7
(Australia) Hopman	5	3	5

Quarterfinals
3	(Australia) Schlesinger	6	6	5	6
6	(Australia) Peach	4	1	7	3

Preceded by 1925 U.S. National Championships	Grand Slam men's singles	Succeeded by 1926 French Championships
