= Douglas Turner =

Douglas or Doug Turner may refer to:

== Sportspeople ==
- Douglas Turner (tennis), American Olympic tennis player
- Douglas Turner (sprinter) (born 1966), Welsh track sprinter
- Douglas Turner (rower) (1932–2018), American journalist, newspaper executive and rower
- Douglas Turner (ATA tennis) from 1930 in tennis
- Doug Turner (Canadian football), player for Toronto Argonauts
- Doug Turner (curler) from 2013 Canadian Direct Insurance BC Men's Curling Championship – Qualification
- Doug Turner, ice hockey player, see 1940 Memorial Cup

== Others ==
- Doug Turner (sound engineer) (1931–2025), British-American sound engineer
- Douglas H. Turner, American chemist
