= 1926 Australasian Championships – Women's doubles =

Women's doubles
- 1926 Australasian Championships

Final
- Champions: (Australia) Esna Boyd (Australia) Meryl O'Hara Wood
- Runners-up: (Australia) Daphne Akhurst (Australia) Marjorie Cox
- Score: 6–3, 6–8, 8–6

Details
- Draw: 13
- Seeds: 4

Events
Singles	men	women		boys	girls
Doubles	men	women	mixed	boys	girls
- Australasian Championships

The first seeds Esna Boyd and Meryl O'Hara Wood defeated second-seeded Daphne Akhurst and Marjorie Cox 6–3, 6–8, 8–6 in the final, to win the women's doubles tennis title at the 1926 Australasian Championships.

== Seeds ==
1. (Australia) Esna Boyd / (Australia) Meryl O'Hara Wood (champions)
2. (Australia) Daphne Akhurst / (Australia) Marjorie Cox (final)
3. (Australia) Sylvia Harper / (Australia) Minnie Richardson (semifinals)
4. (Australia) Kathleen Le Messurier / (Australia) Dorothy Weston (semifinals)

== Draw ==
Key

- Q = Qualifier
- WC = Wild card
- LL = Lucky loser
- Alt = Alternate
- ITF = ITF entry
- PR = Protected ranking
- SR = Special ranking
- SE = Special exempt
- JE = Junior exempt
- JR = Junior Accelerator Programme entrant
- CO = College Accelerator Programme entrant
- NG = Next Gen Accelerator Program entrant
- w/o = Walkover
- r = Retired
- d = Defaulted

=== Draw ===
First round
(Australia) Nell Hamilton (Australia) Edna Lawrence	6	6
(Australia) Jean Laughton (Australia) Lois Laughton	3	2
(Australia) Alison Hooper (Australia) Beryl Turner	4	6	6
(Australia) Vera Mathias (Australia) Mrs. W. T. Rowe ^{[a]}	6	2	0
3	(Australia) Sylvia Harper (Australia) Minnie Richardson	6	6
(Australia) Mrs. Menzies (Australia) Agnes Ridgway	1	1
(Australia) Margaret Officer (Australia) Margaret Taylor	8	9
(Australia) Jocelyn Bowman (Australia) Joyce Lillecrapp	6	7
2	(Australia) Daphne Akhurst (Australia) Marjorie Cox	6	6
(Australia) Lorna Bollen (Australia) Anna Menz	1	2

Quarterfinals
1	(Australia) Esna Boyd (Australia) Meryl O'Hara Wood	0	6	6
(Australia) Nell Hamilton (Australia) Edna Lawrence	6	2	0
(Australia) Alison Hooper (Australia) Beryl Turner	4	3
3	(Australia) Sylvia Harper (Australia) Minnie Richardson	6	6
4	(Australia) Kathleen Le Messurier (Australia) Dorothy Weston	6	6
(Australia) Molly Finlayson ^{[b]} (Australia) Mary Laidlaw	1	4
(Australia) Margaret Officer (Australia) Margaret Taylor	4	3
2	(Australia) Daphne Akhurst (Australia) Marjorie Cox	6	6

Semifinals
1	(Australia) Esna Boyd (Australia) Meryl O'Hara Wood	4	8	6
3	(Australia) Sylvia Harper (Australia) Minnie Richardson	6	6	2
4	(Australia) Kathleen Le Messurier (Australia) Dorothy Weston	5	1
2	(Australia) Daphne Akhurst (Australia) Marjorie Cox	7	6

Final
1	(Australia) Esna Boyd (Australia) Meryl O'Hara Wood	6	6	8
2	(Australia) Daphne Akhurst (Australia) Marjorie Cox	3	8	6

== Notes ==
- ^{a} Most likely Flora Rowe, mother of Ernest Rowe.
- ^{b} Most likely. Often spelled Miss C. Finlayson, even in sources that mentioned her as Miss M. Finlayson in other articles.
