= 1930 Australian Championships – Women's doubles =

Women's doubles
- 1930 Australian Championships

Final
- Champions: (Australia) Emily Hood (Australia) Mall Molesworth
- Runners-up: (Australia) Marjorie Cox (Australia) Sylvia Harper
- Score: 6–3, 0–6, 7–5

Details
- Draw: 11
- Seeds: 4

Events
Singles	men	women		boys	girls
Doubles	men	women	mixed	boys	girls
- Australian Championships

Third-seeded Emily Hood and Mall Molesworth defeated the second seeds Marjorie Cox and Sylvia Harper 6–3, 0–6, 7–5 in the final, to win the women's doubles tennis title at the 1930 Australian Championships.

== Seeds ==
1. (Australia) Daphne Akhurst / (Australia) Louie Bickerton (semifinals)
2. (Australia) Marjorie Cox / (Australia) Sylvia Harper (final)
3. (Australia) Emily Hood / (Australia) Mall Molesworth (champions)
4. (Australia) Kathleen Le Messurier / (Australia) Dorothy Weston (semifinals)

== Draw ==
Key

- Q = Qualifier
- WC = Wild card
- LL = Lucky loser
- Alt = Alternate
- ITF = ITF entry
- PR = Protected ranking
- SR = Special ranking
- SE = Special exempt
- JE = Junior exempt
- JR = Junior Accelerator Programme entrant
- CO = College Accelerator Programme entrant
- NG = Next Gen Accelerator Program entrant
- w/o = Walkover
- r = Retired
- d = Defaulted

=== Draw ===
First round
3	(Australia) Emily Hood (Australia) Mall Molesworth	6	6
(Australia) Vere de Bavay (Australia) Ursula Price	1	4
2	(Australia) Marjorie Cox (Australia) Sylvia Harper	6	6
(Australia) Kath Commins (Australia) Alison Hattersley	4	2
(Australia) Kath Murdoch (Australia) Joan Pett	6	6
(Australia) Mollie McGrath (Australia) Peter Smith	1	3

Quarterfinals
1	(Australia) Daphne Akhurst (Australia) Louie Bickerton	6	6
(Australia) Youtha Anthony (Australia) Helen Gray	3	0
(Australia) Frances Hoddle-Wrigley (Australia) Gladys Toyne	9	1
3	(Australia) Emily Hood (Australia) Mall Molesworth	11	6
2	(Australia) Marjorie Cox (Australia) Sylvia Harper	6	7
(Australia) Kath Murdoch (Australia) Joan Pett	3	5
4	(Australia) Kathleen Le Messurier (Australia) Dorothy Weston	8	6
(Australia) Birdie Bond (Australia) Molly Muirhead	6	4

Semifinals
1	(Australia) Daphne Akhurst (Australia) Louie Bickerton	4	9	4
3	(Australia) Emily Hood (Australia) Mall Molesworth	6	7	6
2	(Australia) Marjorie Cox (Australia) Sylvia Harper	8	6
4	(Australia) Kathleen Le Messurier (Australia) Dorothy Weston	6	1

Final
3	(Australia) Emily Hood (Australia) Mall Molesworth	6	0	7
2	(Australia) Marjorie Cox (Australia) Sylvia Harper	3	6	5
