= 1930 Australian Championships =

- Date: 18–25 January 1930
- Edition: 23rd
- Category: Grand Slam (ITF)
- Surface: Grass
- Location: Melbourne, Australia
- Venue: Kooyong Stadium

Champions

Men's singles
- (Australia) Gar Moon

Women's singles
- (Australia) Daphne Akhurst

Men's doubles
- (Australia) Jack Crawford / (Australia) Harry Hopman

Women's doubles
- (Australia) Emily Hood / (Australia) Mall Molesworth

Mixed doubles
- (Australia) Nell Hall / (Australia) Harry Hopman

Boys' singles
- (Australia) Don Turnbull

Girls' singles
- (Australia) Emily Hood

Boys' doubles
- (Australia) Adrian Quist / (Australia) Don Turnbull

Girls' doubles
- (Australia) Emily Hood / (Australia) Nell Hall
- Australian Championships

The 1930 Australian Championships was a tennis tournament that took place on outdoor Grass courts at the Kooyong Stadium in Melbourne, Australia from 18 January to 27 January. It was the 23rd edition of the Australian Championships (now known as the Australian Open), the 6th held in Melbourne, and the first Grand Slam tournament of the year. Australians Gar Moon and Daphne Akhurst won the singles titles.

== Finals ==
=== Men's singles ===
(Australia) Gar Moon defeated (Australia) Harry Hopman 6–3, 6–1, 6–3

=== Women's singles ===
(Australia) Daphne Akhurst defeated (Australia) Sylvia Harper 10–8, 2–6, 7–5

=== Men's doubles ===
(Australia) Jack Crawford / (Australia) Harry Hopman defeated (Australia) Tim Fitchett / (Australia) Jack Hawkes 8–6, 6–1, 2–6, 6–3

=== Women's doubles ===
(Australia) Emily Hood / (Australia) Mall Molesworth defeated (Australia) Marjorie Cox / (Australia) Sylvia Harper 6–3, 0–6, 7–5

=== Mixed doubles ===
(Australia) Nell Hall / (Australia) Harry Hopman defeated (Australia) Marjorie Cox / (Australia) Jack Crawford 11–9, 3–6, 6–3

Preceded by 1929 U.S. National Championships	Grand Slams	Succeeded by 1930 French Championships
