= 1927 Australian Championships – Men's singles =

Men's singles
- 1927 Australian Championships

Final
- Champion: (Australia) Gerald Patterson
- Runner-up: (Australia) Jack Hawkes
- Score: 3–6, 6–4, 3–6, 18–16, 6–3

Details
- Seeds: 8

Events
Singles	men	women		boys	girls
Doubles	men	women	mixed	boys	girls
- Australian Championships

Gerald Patterson defeated Jack Hawkes 3–6, 6–4, 3–6, 18–16, 6–3 in the final to win the Men's Singles Tennis title at the 1927 Australian Championships.

== Seeds ==
The seeded players are listed below. Gerald Patterson is the champion; others show the round in which they were eliminated.

1. (Australia) Gerald Patterson (champion)
2. (Australia) Jim Willard (semifinals)
3. (Australia) Jack Hawkes (finalist)
4. (Australia) Jack Crawford (quarterfinals)
5. (Australia) Bob Schlesinger (quarterfinals)
6. (Australia) Jack Cummings (third round)
7. (Australia) Gar Moon (semifinals)
8. (Australia) Pat O'Hara Wood (third round)

== Draw ==
=== Key ===
- Q = Qualifier
- WC = Wild card
- LL = Lucky loser
- r = Retired

=== Final eight ===
Quarterfinals
7	(Australia) Gar Moon	2	9	8	6	8
4	(Australia) Jack Crawford	6	11	6	3	6
5	(Australia) Bob Schlesinger	2	3	6	2
1	(Australia) Gerald Patterson	6	6	2	6
(Australia) Alan Coldham	4	0	1
3	(Australia) Jack Hawkes	6	6	6
(Australia) Gordon Lum	2	0	4
2	(Australia) Jim Willard	6	6	6

Semifinals
7	(Australia) Gar Moon	3	3	7
1	(Australia) Gerald Patterson	6	6	9
3	(Australia) Jack Hawkes	6	4	6	6
2	(Australia) Jim Willard	0	6	2	1

Final
1	(Australia) Gerald Patterson	3	6	3	18	6
3	(Australia) Jack Hawkes	6	4	6	16	3

=== Earlier rounds ===
==== Section 1 ====
First round

Second round
(Australia) Targett
(Australia) Gemmell	w/o
(Australia) Daley	0	2	1
7	(Australia) Moon	6	6	6
(Australia) Breden	3	3	2
(Australia) MacGillicuddy	6	6	6
(Australia) Jacoby	2	3	6	1
4	(Australia) Crawford	6	6	4	6

Third round
(Australia) Gemmell	4	11	2
7	(Australia) Moon	6	13	6
(Australia) MacGillicuddy	5	3	5
4	(Australia) Crawford	7	6	7

Quarterfinals
7	(Australia) Moon	2	9	8	6	8
4	(Australia) Crawford	6	11	6	3	6

==== Section 2 ====
First round
(Australia) Mullamphy	6	8	1	3
(Australia) Lamb	8	6	6	6
(Australia) Turnbull	6	0	9	2	7
(France) Aslangul	3	6	7	6	9
(Australia) Wilson	6	2	3	8
(Australia) Hicks	4	6	6	10
(Australia) Noske	4	6	2	6
1	(Australia) Patterson	6	3	6	8

Second round
(Australia) James	2	6	6	3	5
(Australia) Wallace	6	3	2	6	7
(Australia) Hone	3	4	3
5	(Australia) Schlesinger	6	6	6
(Australia) Lamb	2	8	5
(France) Aslangul	6	10	7
(Australia) Hicks	6	5	2
1	(Australia) Patterson	8	7	6

Third round
(Australia) Wallace	2	2	6	4
5	(Australia) Schlesinger	6	6	4	6
(France) Aslangul	7	3	3	3
1	(Australia) Patterson	5	6	6	6

Quarterfinals
5	(Australia) Schlesinger	2	3	6	2
1	(Australia) Patterson	6	6	2	6

==== Section 3 ====
First round
(Australia) Fysh	4	6	3
(Australia) Fitchett	6	8	6
(Australia) Grinstead	0	6	1	2
(Australia) Coldham	6	2	6	6
(Australia) Robinson
(Australia) Wertheim	w/o
(Australia) Broadhurst	1	3	2
8	(Australia) O'Hara Wood	6	6	6

Second round
(Australia) Fitchett	3	6	6	4	0
(Australia) Coldham	6	3	4	6	6
(Australia) Wertheim	3	3	3
8	(Australia) O'Hara Wood	6	6	6
(Australia) Shepherd	4	6	4	1
(Australia) Smith	6	2	6	6
(Australia) Millear	0	2	1
3	(Australia) Hawkes	6	6	6

Third round
(Australia) Coldham	8	8	1	6
8	(Australia) O'Hara Wood	6	6	6	3
(Australia) Smith	2	0	2
3	(Australia) Hawkes	6	6	6

Quarterfinals
(Australia) Coldham	4	0	1
3	(Australia) Hawkes	6	6	6

==== Section 4 ====
First round

Second round
(Australia) Dickinson	6	6	4	3	2
(Australia) Lum	3	4	6	6	6
(Australia) Reed	3	6	7	2	3
6	(Australia) Cummings	6	4	5	6	6
(Australia) Hopman	5	8	1
(Australia) Ford	7	10	6
(Australia) Halliday	5	2	1
2	(Australia) J. Willard	7	6	6

Third round
(Australia) Lum	6	6	3	6
6	(Australia) Cummings	2	1	6	1
(Australia) Ford	0	4	4
2	(Australia) J. Willard	6	6	6

Quarterfinals
(Australia) Lum	2	0	4
2	(Australia) J. Willard	6	6	6

Preceded by 1926 U.S. National Championships	Grand Slam men's singles	Succeeded by 1927 French Championships
