= 1927 Australian Championships =

- Date: 22 January – 31 January 1927
- Edition: 20th
- Category: Grand Slam (ITF)
- Surface: Grass
- Location: Melbourne, Australia
- Venue: Kooyong Stadium

Champions

Men's singles
- (Australia) Gerald Patterson

Women's singles
- (Australia) Esna Boyd

Men's doubles
- (Australia) Jack Hawkes / (Australia) Gerald Patterson

Women's doubles
- (Australia) Louie Bickerton / (Australia) Meryl O'Hara Wood

Mixed doubles
- (Australia) Esna Boyd / (Australia) Jack Hawkes

Boys' singles
- (Australia) Jack Crawford

Boys' doubles
- (Australia) Jack Crawford / (Australia) Harry Hopman
- Australian Championships

The 1927 Australian Championships was a tennis tournament that took place on outdoor Grass courts at the Kooyong Stadium in Melbourne, Australia from 22 January to 1 February. It was the 20th edition of the Australian Championships (now known as the Australian Open), the 5th held in Melbourne, and the first Grand Slam tournament of the year. Australians Gerald Patterson and Esna Boyd won the singles titles.

== Finals ==
=== Men's singles ===
(Australia) Gerald Patterson defeated (Australia) Jack Hawkes 3–6, 6–4, 3–6, 18–16, 6–3

=== Women's singles ===
(Australia) Esna Boyd defeated (Australia) Sylvia Lance Harper 5–7, 6–1, 6–2

=== Men's doubles ===
(Australia) Jack Hawkes / (Australia) Gerald Patterson defeated (Australia) Ian McInness / (Australia) Pat O'Hara Wood 8–6, 6–1, 6–2

=== Women's doubles ===
(Australia) Louie Bickerton / (Australia) Meryl O'Hara Wood defeated (Australia) Esna Boyd / (Australia) Sylvia Lance Harper 6–3, 6–3

=== Mixed doubles ===
(Australia) Esna Boyd / (Australia) Jack Hawkes defeated (Australia) Youtha Anthony / (Australia) Jim Willard 6–1, 6–3

Preceded by 1926 U.S. National Championships	Grand Slams	Succeeded by 1927 French Championships
