= 1930 Australian Championships – Women's singles =

Women's singles
- 1930 Australian Championships

Final
- Champion: (Australia) Daphne Akhurst
- Runner-up: (Australia) Sylvia Harper
- Score: 10–8, 2–6, 7–5

Details
- Draw: 20
- Seeds: 8

Events
Singles	men	women		boys	girls
Doubles	men	women	mixed	boys	girls
- Australian Championships

First-seeded Daphne Akhurst defeated Sylvia Harper 10–8, 2–6, 7–5, in the final to win the women's singles tennis title at the 1930 Australian Championships.

== Seeds ==
The seeded players are listed below. Daphne Akhurst is the champion; others show the round in which they were eliminated.

1. (Australia) Daphne Akhurst (champion)
2. (Australia) Louie Bickerton (semifinals)
3. (Australia) Marjorie Cox (quarterfinals)
4. (Australia) Sylvia Harper (finalist)
5. (Australia) Kathleen Le Messurier (quarterfinals)
6. (Australia) Mall Molesworth (quarterfinals)
7. (Australia) Gladys Toyne (quarterfinals)
8. (Australia) Emily Hood (semifinals)

== Draw ==
=== Key ===
- Q = Qualifier
- WC = Wild card
- LL = Lucky loser
- r = Retired

=== Finals ===
Quarterfinals
1	(Australia) Daphne Akhurst	6	3	6
5	(Australia) Kathleen Le Messurier	1	6	4
3	(Australia) Marjorie Cox	5	4
8	(Australia) Emily Hood	7	6
2	(Australia) Louie Bickerton	6	7
7	(Australia) Gladys Toyne	4	5
4	(Australia) Sylvia Harper	6	3	6
6	(Australia) Mall Molesworth	4	6	2

Semifinals
1	(Australia) Daphne Akhurst	6	6
8	(Australia) Emily Hood	0	2
2	(Australia) Louie Bickerton	3	6
4	(Australia) Sylvia Harper	6	8

Finals
1	(Australia) Daphne Akhurst	10	2	7
4	(Australia) Sylvia Harper	8	6	5

=== Earlier rounds ===
==== Section 1 ====
First round
(Australia) Bond	6	6
(Australia) Commins	3	2
(Australia) Hall	10	6	3
8	(Australia) Hood	12	1	6

Second round
1	(Australia) Akhurst	6	6
(Australia) McGrath	1	2
(Australia) Anthony	2	2
5	(Australia) Le Messurier	6	6
3	(Australia) Cox	9	6
(Australia) Smith	7	0
(Australia) Bond	4	4
8	(Australia) Hood	6	6

Quarterfinals
1	(Australia) Akhurst	6	3	6
5	(Australia) Le Messurier	1	6	4
3	(Australia) Cox	5	4
8	(Australia) Hood	7	6

Semifinals
1	(Australia) Akhurst	6	6
8	(Australia) Hood	0	2

==== Section 2 ====
First round
2	(Australia) Bickerton	6	6
(Australia) Muirhead	2	0
(Australia) Hattersley	4	12	6
(Australia) Murdoch	6	10	3

Second round
2	(Australia) Bickerton	6	6
(Australia) Hattersley	3	3
(Australia) Price	3	5
7	(Australia) Toyne	6	7
4	(Australia) Harper	6	6
(Australia) Weston	3	0
(Australia) Hoddle-Wrigley	4	0
6	(Australia) Molesworth	6	6

Quarterfinals
2	(Australia) Bickerton	6	7
7	(Australia) Toyne	4	5
4	(Australia) Harper	6	3	6
6	(Australia) Molesworth	4	6	2

Semifinals
2	(Australia) Bickerton	3	6
4	(Australia) Harper	6	8

Preceded by 1929 U.S. National Championships – Women's singles	Grand Slam women's singles	Succeeded by 1930 French Championships – Women's singles
