= Hermes (publication) =

Annual literary journal

- Editor(s): Annually appointed
- Categories: Literature, art
- Frequency: Annually
- Publisher: University of Sydney Union
- First issue: 1886
- Country: Australia
- Language: English
- Website: digital.library.sydney.edu.au/nodes/view/6395

Hermes is the annual literary journal published by the University of Sydney Union. It is the oldest such journal in Australasia, having been established in 1886.

== History ==
Hermes was established in 1886. The first issue of Hermes appeared in July 1886. Publication was suspended in 1942–1944, 1953, 1955, 1964, and 1970–1984. Hermes is edited by current students and all content within the publication is provided by students, staff and alumni from the University of Sydney. While in recent years there have been themes for specific editions, the journal publishes written, creative and visual pieces. A special jubilee edition was published in 1902 to coincide with the University's anniversary.

Today, Hermes acts as the printed Creative Catalogue for the USU Creative Awards. Each year winners of The USU Creative Awards have their work published in Hermes, win prize money and have their works displayed professionally at the Verge Gallery.

== Past editors ==
Distinguished former editors of Hermes have included Thomas Bavin (1897), H. V. Evatt (1916), John Le Gay Brereton (1892-94), Clive Evatt (1926), James McAuley (1937), Jock Marshall (1941), and a duo of Les Murray and Geoffrey Lehmann in 1962. Kathleen M. Commins was the first woman editor in 1931. In 2015 the Editorial team was entirely women: Elle Burchell, Pheobe Corleone, Madeleine Gray and Tahlia Chloe.

== Editors 1886-2017 ==
| Editors | Year | Notes |
|---|---|---|
| S.A. Thompson and G. P. Barbour | 1887 | |
| R. Windeyer and A.S. Vallack | 1890 | |
| T. Darbys, A.E. Henry, and H. F. Maxwell | 1894 | |
| W. J. Bradley | 1917 | |
| W. E. R. Francis | 1920 | |
| W. J. V. Windeyer | 1921 - 1922 | |
| A. B. Barry | 1923 | |
| J. W. Bavin | 1925 | |
| Clive Evatt | 1926 | |
| R. Ashburner | 1927 | |
| I. M. Edwards | 1928 | |
| H. M. Cromarty | 1929 | |
| Howard Daniel | 1933 | |
| James McAuley | 1937 | |
| R. W. Rutledge | 1939 | |
| Noel Hush and George Munster | 1946 | |
| P. Gerber | 1947 | |
| Lex Banning and Derick Hoste | 1951 | |
| Derick Hoste | 1952 | |
| Eddie Camion and Peter Condon | 1954 | |
| Mari Kuttna and Brian Hennessy | 1956 | |
| Martin Davey | 1957 | |
| John Joseph Howard | 1960 | |
| Brian Sommers | 1961 | |
| Les Murray and Geoff Lehmann | 1962 | |
| Don Anderson and Neil A. McPherson | 1963 | |
| Ron Blair | 1965 | |
| Brian Freeman and Albert Moran | 1969 | |
| Bev Elizabeth Brown, David Ellison, Matthew Karpin, Peter Kirkpatrick, Margo Lanagan, and Judy Quinn | 1985 | "New Issue Vol. 1, No. 1: 1985" |
| Judith Elen, David Ellison, Katie Florance, Mike Funston, Matthew Karpin, David Musgrave, Judy Quinn, Maria Simms, Gerry Turcotte, and Theresa Willsteed | 1986 | |
| Naomi Cameron, Sean Kelly, Julia Martin, David Musgrave, Mark Pollock, and Jane Sutton | 1987 | |
| Stephen Craft, Delia Falconer, Keri Glastonbury, Eugene Hoh, Anthony O'Shea, Jason Saltearn, Alanna Sherry, and Jane Sutton | 1989 | |
| Stephen Craft, Delia Falconer, Keri Glastonbury, Eugene Hoh, Julia Leigh, and David Musgrave | 1990 | |
| Maisie Dubosarsky, Lucy Howard-Taylor, Amy Ireland, and Lukasz Swiatek | 2007 | No theme |
| Amelia Walkley, Bronwyn O’Reilly, Khym Scott and Raven Dakota | 2009 | |
| Connie Ye, Dominic McNeil and Michael Falk | 2011 | Theme: 2011 A.D. |
| Chenoa Fawn, Jackson Busse, Gabriella Edelstein and Kate Farrell | 2012 | Theme: Odyssey, former editor Geoffrey Lehmann guest speaker |
| Melanie Kembrey, Nick Fahy, Patricia Arcilla and Nick Richardson | 2013 | Theme: Elements, Delia Falconer guest speaker |
| Rebecca Allen, Whitney Duan, Celeste Moore and Eleanor Turner | 2014 | Theme: Liminal, Richard Glover guest speaker |
| Elle Burchell, Phoebe Corleone, Madeleine Gray and Tahlia Chloe | 2015 | Theme: Manufactured, David Malouf Guest Speaker |
| Michael Sun and Marilyn Meen Yee Ooi | 2016 | Theme: Warped |
| Alexandra Bateman and Samantha Clemente | 2017 | No theme |
