= Jack Clemenger =

Australian tennis player

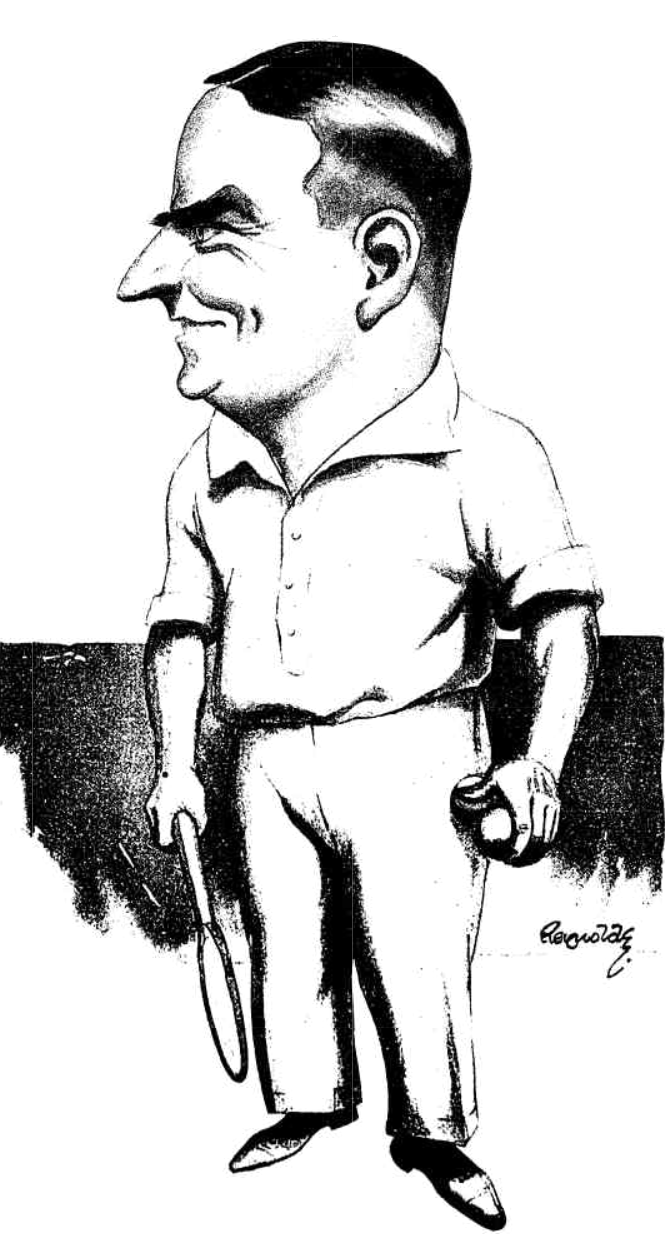
- 1930 caricature by Reynolds
- Full name: John Clemenger
- Country (sports): Australia
- Born: 3 January 1899; Gundaroo, New South Wales, Australia
- Died: 8 February 1964 (aged 65); Melbourne, Victoria, Australia
- Turned pro: 1919 (amateur tour)
- Retired: 1940

Singles

Grand Slam singles results
- Australian Open: QF (1922, 1930)
- Wimbledon: 3R (1932)

Doubles

Grand Slam doubles results
- Australian Open: QF (1930, 1933, 1934, 1938, 1939)
- Wimbledon: 2R (1932)

Mixed doubles

Grand Slam mixed doubles results
- Australian Open: QF (1924, 1930)
- Wimbledon: 4R (1932)

Jack Clemenger (1899–1964) was an Australian tennis player. He began his career in New South Wales and then moved to Victoria. In business (which took up a lot of his time) he rose to the rank of general sales manager at Allied motors in Australia. While studying at Sydney University, Clemenger played baseball, billiards, cricket and rugby, but it was at tennis he most excelled. He had a good all round game and was better at doubles than singles. Clemenger made his debut at the 1919 Australasian championships and lost in round three to James Anderson. At the 1922 championships, Clemenger lost in the quarter-finals to Norman Peach. In 1924 he lost in round one to Garton Hone. In 1930 he lost in the quarter-finals to Harry Hopman. At Wimbledon in 1932, Clemenger lost in five sets in round three to Paul Féret. At the 1933 Australian championships, Clemenger lost in round two to Keith Gledhill. At the 1935 Australian championships, Clemenger beat Jacques Brugnon before losing to Giorgio de Stefani in round three. In 1939 he lost in round one to Colin Long. Clemenger was an Australian Davis Cup captain and selector. He started Clemenger Advertising (one of the top advertising agencies in Australia) in 1946 and was awarded the OBE.
