= 1927 Australian Championships – Women's singles =

Women's singles
- 1927 Australian Championships

Final
- Champion: (Australia) Esna Boyd
- Runner-up: (Australia) Sylvia Harper
- Score: 5–7, 6–1, 6–2

Details
- Draw: 21
- Seeds: 8

Events
Singles	men	women		boys	girls
Doubles	men	women	mixed	boys	girls
← 1926 ·	Australian Championships	· 1928 →

First-seeded Esna Boyd defeated Sylvia Harper 5–7, 6–1, 6–2, in the final to win the women's singles tennis title at the 1927 Australian Championships (Tennis).

== Seeds ==
The seeded players are listed below. Esna Boyd is the champion; others show the round in which they were eliminated.

1. (Australia) Esna Boyd (champion)
2. (Australia) Daphne Akhurst (second round)
3. (Australia) Sylvia Harper (finalist)
4. (Australia) Louie Bickerton (semifinals)
5. (Australia) Gladys Toyne (second round)
6. (Australia) Marjorie Cox (quarterfinals)
7. (Australia) Kathleen Le Messurier (quarterfinals)
8. (Australia) Minnie Richardson (second round)

== Draw ==
=== Key ===
- Q = Qualifier
- WC = Wild card
- LL = Lucky loser
- r = Retired

=== Finals ===
Quarterfinals
(Australia) Dorothy Weston	4	0
(Australia) Beryl Turner	6	6
3	(Australia) Sylvia Harper	1	6	6
6	(Australia) Marjorie Cox	6	3	3
1	(Australia) Esna Boyd	6	6
(Australia) Dorothy Bellamy	2	3
4	(Australia) Louie Bickerton	6	4	6
7	(Australia) Kathleen Le Messurier	4	6	2

Semifinals
(Australia) Beryl Turner	2	0
3	(Australia) Sylvia Harper	6	6
1	(Australia) Esna Boyd	6	6
4	(Australia) Louie Bickerton	3	1

Finals
3	(Australia) Sylvia Harper	7	1	2
1	(Australia) Esna Boyd	5	6	6

=== Earlier rounds ===
==== Section 1 ====
First round
2	(Australia) Akhurst	6	6
(Australia) Parsons	2	1
(Australia) Weston	6	3	6
(Australia) De Bavay	2	6	4

Second round
2	(Australia) Akhurst	w/o
(Australia) Weston
(Australia) Turner	6	6
8	(Australia) Richardson	4	3
3	(Australia) Harper	6	6
(Australia) McKay	0	0
6	(Australia) Cox	3	6	6
(Australia) Anthony	6	3	2

Quarterfinals
(Australia) Weston	4	0
(Australia) Turner	6	6
3	(Australia) Harper	1	6	6
6	(Australia) Cox	6	3	3

Semifinals
(Australia) Turner	2	0
3	(Australia) Harper	6	6

==== Section 2 ====
First round
5	(Australia) Toyne	6	6
(Australia) Hopkins	1	1
7	(Australia) Le Messurier	6	6
(Australia) Bere	1	1
(Australia) Hoddle-Wrigley	8	6
(Australia) St. George	6	2

Second round
1	(Australia) Boyd	6	6
(Australia) Stephens	0	2
(Australia) Bellamy	7	6
(Australia) Irving	5	1
4	(Australia) Bickerton	6	6
5	(Australia) Toyne	3	3
7	(Australia) Le Messurier	9	6
(Australia) Hoddle-Wrigley	7	3

Quarterfinals
1	(Australia) Boyd	6	6
(Australia) Bellamy	2	3
4	(Australia) Bickerton	6	4	6
7	(Australia) Le Messurier	4	6	2

Semifinals
1	(Australia) Boyd	6	6
4	(Australia) Bickerton	3	1

== Notes ==
- Weston vs. De Bavay: some sources give 6–3, 3–6, 6–4.
- Cox vs. Anthony: some sources give 3–6, 6–3, 6–3.

Preceded by 1926 U.S. National Championships – Women's singles	Grand Slam women's singles	Succeeded by 1927 French Championships – Women's singles
