= 1926 Australasian Championships – Women's singles =

Women's singles
- 1926 Australasian Championships

Final
- Champion: (Australia) Daphne Akhurst
- Runner-up: (Australia) Esna Boyd
- Score: 6–1, 6–3

Details
- Draw: 19
- Seeds: 8

Events
Singles	men	women		boys	girls
Doubles	men	women	mixed	boys	girls
← 1925 ·	Australasian Championships	· 1927 →

First-seeded Daphne Akhurst defeated Esna Boyd 6–1, 6–3, in the final to win the women's singles tennis title at the 1926 Australasian Championships.

== Seeds ==
The seeded players are listed below. Daphne Akhurst is the champion; others show the round in which they were eliminated.

1. (Australia) Daphne Akhurst (champion)
2. (Australia) Esna Boyd (finalist)
3. (Australia) Sylvia Harper (semifinals)
4. (Australia) Marjorie Cox (semifinals)
5. (Australia) Meryl O'Hara Wood (quarterfinals)
6. (Australia) Kathleen Le Messurier (quarterfinals)
7. (Australia) Minnie Richardson (quarterfinals)
8. (Australia) Beryl Turner (quarterfinals)

== Draw ==
=== Key ===
- Q = Qualifier
- WC = Wild card
- LL = Lucky loser
- r = Retired

=== Finals ===
Quarterfinals
1	(Australia) Daphne Akhurst	7	6
6	(Australia) Kathleen Le Messurier	5	2
4	(Australia) Marjorie Cox	6	6
7	(Australia) Minnie Richardson	2	2
2	(Australia) Esna Boyd	6	7
5	(Australia) Meryl O'Hara Wood	1	5
3	(Australia) Sylvia Harper	6	6
8	(Australia) Beryl Turner	1	4

Semifinals
1	(Australia) Daphne Akhurst	6	6
4	(Australia) Marjorie Cox	1	3
2	(Australia) Esna Boyd	6	3	6
3	(Australia) Sylvia Harper	4	6	3

Finals
1	(Australia) Daphne Akhurst	6	6
2	(Australia) Esna Boyd	1	3

=== Earlier rounds ===
==== Section 1 ====
First round
7	(Australia) Richardson	6	6
(Australia) Lillecrapp	2	3
(Australia) Mathias	6	6
(Australia) Officer	3	4

Second round
1	(Australia) Akhurst	6	6
(Australia) Weston	4	3
6	(Australia) Le Messurier	6	6
(Australia) Taylor	1	4
4	(Australia) Cox	6	6
(Australia) Hooper	1	1
7	(Australia) Richardson	6	6
(Australia) Mathias	3	2

Quarterfinals
1	(Australia) Akhurst	7	6
6	(Australia) Le Messurier	5	2
4	(Australia) Cox	6	6
7	(Australia) Richardson	2	2

Semifinals
1	(Australia) Akhurst	6	6
4	(Australia) Cox	1	3

==== Section 2 ====
First round
(Australia) Menz
(Australia) Mrs. W. T. Rowe	w/o

Second round
2	(Australia) Boyd	6	6
(Australia) Hamilton	0	2
5	(Australia) O'Hara Wood	6	7
(Australia) Lawrence	0	5
3	(Australia) Harper	6	6
(Australia) Bollen	1	2
8	(Australia) Turner	6	6
(Australia) Menz	3	4

Quarterfinals
2	(Australia) Boyd	6	7
5	(Australia) O'Hara Wood	1	5
3	(Australia) Harper	6	6
8	(Australia) Turner	1	4

Semifinals
2	(Australia) Boyd	6	3	6
3	(Australia) Harper	4	6	3

Preceded by 1925 U.S. National Championships – Women's singles	Grand Slam women's singles	Succeeded by 1926 French Championships – Women's singles
