= 1927 Australian Championships – Women's doubles =

Women's doubles
- 1927 Australian Championships

Final
- Champions: (Australia) Louie Bickerton (Australia) Meryl O'Hara Wood
- Runners-up: (Australia) Esna Boyd (Australia) Sylvia Harper
- Score: 6–3, 6–3

Details
- Draw: 13
- Seeds: 4

Events
Singles	men	women		boys	girls
Doubles	men	women	mixed	boys	girls
- Australian Championships

Louie Bickerton and Meryl O'Hara Wood defeated the first seeds Esna Boyd and Sylvia Harper 6–3, 6–3 in the final, to win the women's doubles tennis title at the 1927 Australian Championships.

== Seeds ==
1. (Australia) Esna Boyd / (Australia) Sylvia Harper (final)
2. (Australia) Louie Bickerton / (Australia) Meryl O'Hara Wood ^{[a]} (champions)
3. (Australia) Mavis McKay / (Australia) Gladys Toyne (quarterfinals)
4. (Australia) Kathleen Le Messurier / (Australia) Dorothy Weston (semifinals)

== Draw ==
Key

- Q = Qualifier
- WC = Wild card
- LL = Lucky loser
- Alt = Alternate
- ITF = ITF entry
- PR = Protected ranking
- SR = Special ranking
- SE = Special exempt
- JE = Junior exempt
- JR = Junior Accelerator Programme entrant
- CO = College Accelerator Programme entrant
- NG = Next Gen Accelerator Program entrant
- w/o = Walkover
- r = Retired
- d = Defaulted

=== Draw ===
First round
(Australia) Keyden Irving (Australia) Beryl Turner	9	6
(Australia) Vere de Bavay (Australia) Ursula Bere	7	1
(Australia) Marjorie Cox (Australia) Floris St. George	6	6
(Australia) Ruby Mercer (Australia) K. Westmoreland	4	4
3	(Australia) Mavis McKay (Australia) Gladys Toyne	6	6
(Australia) G. Hopkins (Australia) Mrs. Rowe ^{[b]}	2	1
(Australia) Youtha Anthony (Australia) Mrs. H. M. Gray	6	6
(Australia) Frances Hoddle-Wrigley (Australia) Minnie Richardson	3	4
1	(Australia) Esna Boyd (Australia) Sylvia Harper	6	6
(Australia) Mrs. Newton Wood (Australia) B. Parsons	2	2

Quarterfinals
2	(Australia) Louie Bickerton (Australia) Meryl O'Hara Wood	6	6
(Australia) Keyden Irving (Australia) Beryl Turner	2	1
(Australia) Marjorie Cox (Australia) Floris St. George	6	6
3	(Australia) Mavis McKay (Australia) Gladys Toyne	4	4
4	(Australia) Kathleen Le Messurier (Australia) Dorothy Weston	6	6
(Australia) Dorothy Bellamy (Australia) Ruth Stephens	3	3
(Australia) Youtha Anthony (Australia) Mrs. H. M. Gray	3	6
1	(Australia) Esna Boyd (Australia) Sylvia Harper	6	8

Semifinals
2	(Australia) Louie Bickerton (Australia) Meryl O'Hara Wood	6	5	6
(Australia) Marjorie Cox (Australia) Floris St. George	1	7	4
4	(Australia) Kathleen Le Messurier (Australia) Dorothy Weston	2	3
1	(Australia) Esna Boyd (Australia) Sylvia Harper	6	6

Final
2	(Australia) Louie Bickerton (Australia) Meryl O'Hara Wood	6	6
1	(Australia) Esna Boyd (Australia) Sylvia Harper	3	3

== Notes ==
- ^{a} Original pairing was Bickerton with Daphne Akhurst, but the latter had to withdraw owing to illness.
- ^{b} Probably Mrs. W. T. Rowe (Flora Rowe).
