= Max Carpenter =

Australia international rugby union player (1911–1988)

- Full name: Macquarie Gordon Carpenter
- Born: 17 April 1911 Trangie, NSW, Australia
- Died: 28 June 1988 (aged 77)

Rugby union career
- Position: Wing
International career
Years	Team	Apps	(Points)
1938	Australia	2	(20)

Max Carpenter
Grand Slam doubles results
- Australian Open: 1R (1930)

Macquarie Gordon "Max" Carpenter (17 April 1911 — 28 June 1988) was an Australian rugby union international.

Carpenter, born in Trangie, New South Wales, attended Randwick Intermediate High School and was a state schoolboys rugby league representative. He also played Linton Cup tennis for his state, notably beating Adrian Quist in 1929.

A speedy three-quarter, Carpenter started his rugby career in Western Australia after he had to move to Perth in 1930 for employment. His Wallabies caps came later while he was based in Melbourne, where he played for Footscray. Selected by the Wallabies in 1938 as a winger and goal-kicker, Carpenter contributed 20 of his team's 23 points in his two Bledisloe Cup appearances, including a two-try performance in Brisbane. He was on the 1939–40 tour of Britain and Ireland, that was abandoned two days after the team's arrival because of the war.

Carpenter coached Sydney clubs Drummoyne and Parramatta in the immediate post-war period.

== See also ==
- List of Australia national rugby union players
