= Tim Fitchett =

Australian tennis player (1896–1985)

- Full name: Thomas King Fitchett
- Country (sports): Australia
- Born: 1896 Kew, Victoria, Australia
- Died: 9 September 1985 (aged 85) Kew, Victoria, Australia

Doubles

Grand Slam doubles results
- Australian Open: F (1930)

Thomas King Fitchett (1896 – 1985) was an Australian tennis player.

Fitchett was born in Melbourne and attended Trinity Grammar School.

Active from the 1910s to 1930s, Fitchett was a regular interstate representative for Victoria throughout his career. He made the men's doubles final of the 1930 Australian Championships, partnering John Hawkes.

Fitchett was the father of Hawthorn footballer and state cricketer Michael Fitchett.

== Grand Slam finals ==
=== Men's doubles (1 runner-up) ===
Result	Year	Championship	Surface	Partner	Opponents	Score
Loss	1930	Australian Championships	Grass	(Australia) John Hawkes	(Australia) Jack Crawford (Australia) Harry Hopman	6–8, 1–6, 6–2, 3–6
