= Ian McInnes (tennis) =

Australian tennis player (1901–1977)

- Full name: Ian Donald McInnes
- Country (sports): Australia
- Born: 18 February 1901; Victoria, Australia
- Died: 19 June 1977 (aged 76); Ocean Grove, Victoria, Australia
- Turned pro: 1920 (amateur tour)
- Retired: 1939

Singles

Grand Slam singles results
- Australian Open: QF (1924)
- US Open: 2R (1923)

Doubles

Grand Slam doubles results
- Australian Open: F (1927)

Mixed doubles

Grand Slam mixed doubles results
- Australian Open: SF (1924)

Ian McInnes (1901–1977) was an Australian tennis player. He was also a medical doctor. At the 1923 U.S. Championships, McInnes lost in the second round to Manuel Alonso Areizaga. At the 1924 Australasian championships, McInnes caused a huge upset by beating two-time Wimbledon champion Gerald Patterson. Patterson twisted his ankle in the first set and, because of this, his game was affected and he played mainly from the baseline. McInnes lost in the quarter-finals to Richard Schlesinger. McInnes lost in the second round of the 1927 Australian championships to Rice Gemmell In 1967 McInnes attended Gerald Patterson's funeral.

== Grand Slam finals ==
=== Doubles (1 runner-up) ===
Result	Year	Championship	Surface	Partner	Opponents	Score
Loss	1927	Australian Championships	Grass	(Australia) Pat O'Hara Wood	(Australia) Jack Hawkes (Australia) Gerald Patterson	6–8, 1–6, 2–6
