= Kath Commins =

Australian journalist

Kathleen Mary Commins (1909 - 2003) was an Australian journalist, the first female editor of Australia's oldest literary journal, Hermes (in 1931). Kathleen joined the Sydney Morning Herald in 1934 and became the first female sports writer in Australia, then became the first female executive at the Sydney Morning Herald, as Assistant to the Chief of Staff from 1948–1969.

== Biography ==
Kathleen Commins was the daughter of Frances Bede Commins, and Nola Commins, and was born in Parkes, New South Wales, Australia. Her brother was Jack Commins, who became the head of the ABC Bureau in Canberra. Her father served Australia in World War I, and was a casualty of the War in 1917. After her father's death, her mother moved the family to Sydney. Kathleen attended St Vincent's College, then enrolled as a student of the University of Sydney, and graduated with a Bacherlor of Arts in 1931 and a Bachelor of Economics in 1934.

Commins was an avid sportswoman, and captained and managed the New South Wales Women's cricket team and represented New South Wales in the junior division of the Australian lawn tennis championships. She died in 2003, in Killara, a suburb of Sydney, Australia.

== Career ==
Commins was a junior tennis player and played in the 1930 Australian championships. She also played cricket, and in 1936 was player/manager with the NSW women's cricket team during its Queensland tour.

In 1931, while enrolled in her Bachelor of Arts at the University of Sydney, Kathleen Commins became the first women to be editor of the University of Sydney publication Hermes. Commins was also secretary and president of the Women Evening Students' Association, a member of the students' representative council and director of the University Women's Union.

Commins began working for the Sydney Morning Herald in 1934, while still enrolled at the University of Sydney, and she began her journalism career writing about sport. It is believed that she was Australia's first female sports writer. In this role, she, Ruth Preddey, and Gwendoline Varley are credited with increasing public awareness of Australian women's sport and providing advice to young women that were interested in improving their game. Commins also wrote for The Home: An Australian Quarterly between 1939 and 1941. During World War II, Commins began to report on politics, as well as reporting on the war efforts retaining her role as a sports journalist.

In 1948 she was promoted to the role of Assistant to the Chief of Staff, a role that she held for 21 years, and was the only woman in an executive position working outside of the women's pages at the Sydney Morning Herald. She formally retired from this role in 1969, but later returned to the Sydney Morning Herald as cadet counsellor, a role she held until 1974 when she retired. As cadet counsellor, she had an influential role on the careers of many prominent Australian authors and journalists, including Craig McGregor and Col Allan.

== Publications ==
- Australian women's cricket tour of England and Holland: March to September 1937, 1938
