= Lum Pao-Hua =

Lum Bo-Wah
- Full name: Lum Bo-Wah (aka Stephen Gordon Lum)
- Country (sports): Australia; Republic of China
- Born: 11 March 1906 Adelaide, Victoria, Australia
- Died: 18 July 1965 (aged 59) Hong Kong
- Turned pro: 1924 (amateur tour)
- Retired: 1939

Singles
- Career titles: 1

Grand Slam singles results
- Australian Open: QF (1927)
- French Open: 1R (1936)
- Wimbledon: 1R (1936)

Doubles

Grand Slam doubles results
- Australian Open: 2R (1927)

Mixed doubles

Grand Slam mixed doubles results
- Australian Open: QF (1927)

Lum Pao-Hua (Chinese: 林寶華, 1906–1965) was an Australian born tennis player (born Stephen Gordon Lum) who later represented China. He was a quarter finalist in singles at the 1927 Australian Championships. Lum was born in Melbourne and his father was a Chinese born merchant. He modeled his game on Gerald Patterson's.

In 1928, he moved to China, represented China in Davis Cup, and became a Chinese citizen. While in China, he befriended many famous Chinese people, including the last emperor Puyi. During the War, Lum was spared being tortured by a Japanese general because he wanted to learn to play tennis.

== Career ==
He played his first tournament at the Royal South Yarra Championships in 1924.

In 1926, Lum lost in round one of the Australasian championships to Ernest Rowe. The same season he reached the finals of the South Australian Championships in Adelaide where he lost to Ernest Rowe.

At the 1927 Australian championships, Lum beat Jack Cummings. Cummings had just recovered from a bout of scarlet fever and was not at his best. Lum played well, often finishing off points at the net. Lum lost in the quarterfinals to James Willard.

In 1928 he toured in the United States playing Cincinnati at the Tri-State Championships, and reaching the final of the Western States Championships in Chicago, where he lost to Emmett Pare

In 1929 he won the Shanghai Grass Court Championships against British player Ernest Duck to claim his sole singles title.

In 1931 he reached the semi finals of the Chinese National Championships in Shanghai where he lost to Singaporean player Lim Bong Soo.

At the French Championships in 1936, Lum lost in round one to Pierre Goldschmidt. At Wimbledon 1936, Lum lost in round one to Josef Siba.

Also in 1936 whilst touring England he reached the finals of the Harpenden Open where he lost to the American player Dave Jones Jr.

In 1949, Lum moved to Hong Kong.
