= Alan Newton (cricketer) =

Australian cricketer

Personal information
- Full name: Alan Colin Newton
- Born: 6 April 1894; Longford, Tasmania, Australia
- Died: 27 March 1979 (aged 84); Narrabeen, Australia

Domestic team information
- Years: Team
- 1911-1934: Tasmania
- Source: Cricinfo, 20 January 2016

Alan Newton was born on 6 April 1894, and died on 27 March 1979. was an Australian cricketer, who played 27 first-class matches for Tasmania between 1911 and 1934. He was also an A-Grade tennis player who represented Tasmania in Australasian Championships from 1924 to 1926.

== See also ==
- List of Tasmanian representative cricketers
