= Ernest Rowe =

Australian tennis player

- Full name: Ernest Thomas "Ern" Rowe
- Country (sports): Australia
- Born: 5 January 1898 Goodwood, South Australia, Australia
- Died: 13 February 1989 (aged 91) Adelaide, South Australia, Australia
- Turned pro: 1919 (amateur tour)
- Retired: 1933

Singles

Grand Slam singles results
- Australian Open: QF (1926, 1929)

Doubles

Grand Slam doubles results
- Australian Open: QF (1920, 1926, 1929)

Mixed doubles

Grand Slam mixed doubles results
- Australian Open: 2R (1930, 1932)

Ernest Rowe (1898–1989) was an Australian tennis player. He was from South Australia and won his State's singles championship in 1926 and 1927 (beating Pat O'Hara Wood en route to both titles). Rowe made his debut at the Australasian championships in 1920 and lost to Roy Taylor In 1926, in round three of the Australasian championships against Edgar Moon, Rowe lost the first set quickly 6–0, but then he slowed down the pace and got into the match. However, leading 2 sets to 1 and 4–2, the match appeared to be Moon's, but Rowe fought hard, played solidly and won in five sets. Rowe lost in the quarter-finals to James Willard. In 1929 Rowe beat Jack Cummings before losing to Colin Gregory in the quarter-finals. In 1930 he lost in round three to Jack Crawford. In 1932 he lost his first match to Ryosuke Nunoi.
