= Harry Hopman =

Australian tennis player (1906–1985)

Harry Hopman CBE
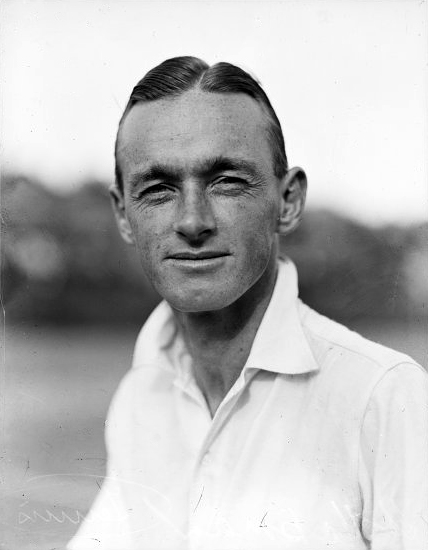
- Full name: Henry Christian Hopman
- Country (sports): Australia
- Born: 12 August 1906 Glebe, New South Wales, Australia
- Died: 27 December 1985 (aged 79) Seminole, Florida, US
- Height: 1.70 m (5 ft 7 in)
- Plays: Right-handed (one-handed backhand)
- Int. Tennis HoF: 1978 (member page)

Singles
- Career record: 463-201 (69.7%)
- Career titles: 34

Grand Slam singles results
- Australian Open: F (1930, 1931, 1932)
- French Open: QF (1930)
- Wimbledon: 4R (1934, 1935)
- US Open: QF (1938, 1939)

Doubles
- Career record: not listed

Grand Slam doubles results
- Australian Open: W (1929, 1930)
- French Open: F (1930, 1948)
- US Open: F (1939)

Mixed doubles
- Career record: not listed

Grand Slam mixed doubles results
- Australian Open: W (1930, 1936, 1937, 1939)
- Wimbledon: F (1945)
- US Open: W (1939)

Henry Christian Hopman CBE (12 August 1906 – 27 December 1985) was an Australian tennis player and coach.

== Early life ==
Harry Hopman was born on 12 August 1906 in Glebe, Sydney as the third child of John Henry Hopman, a schoolteacher, and Jennie Siberteen, née Glad. His family then moved to Parramatta.

Hopman started playing tennis at the age of 13 and, playing barefoot, won an open singles tournament on a court in the playground of Rosehill Public School where his father was headmaster. He was later a student at Parramatta High School where he played tennis and cricket.

== Davis Cup ==
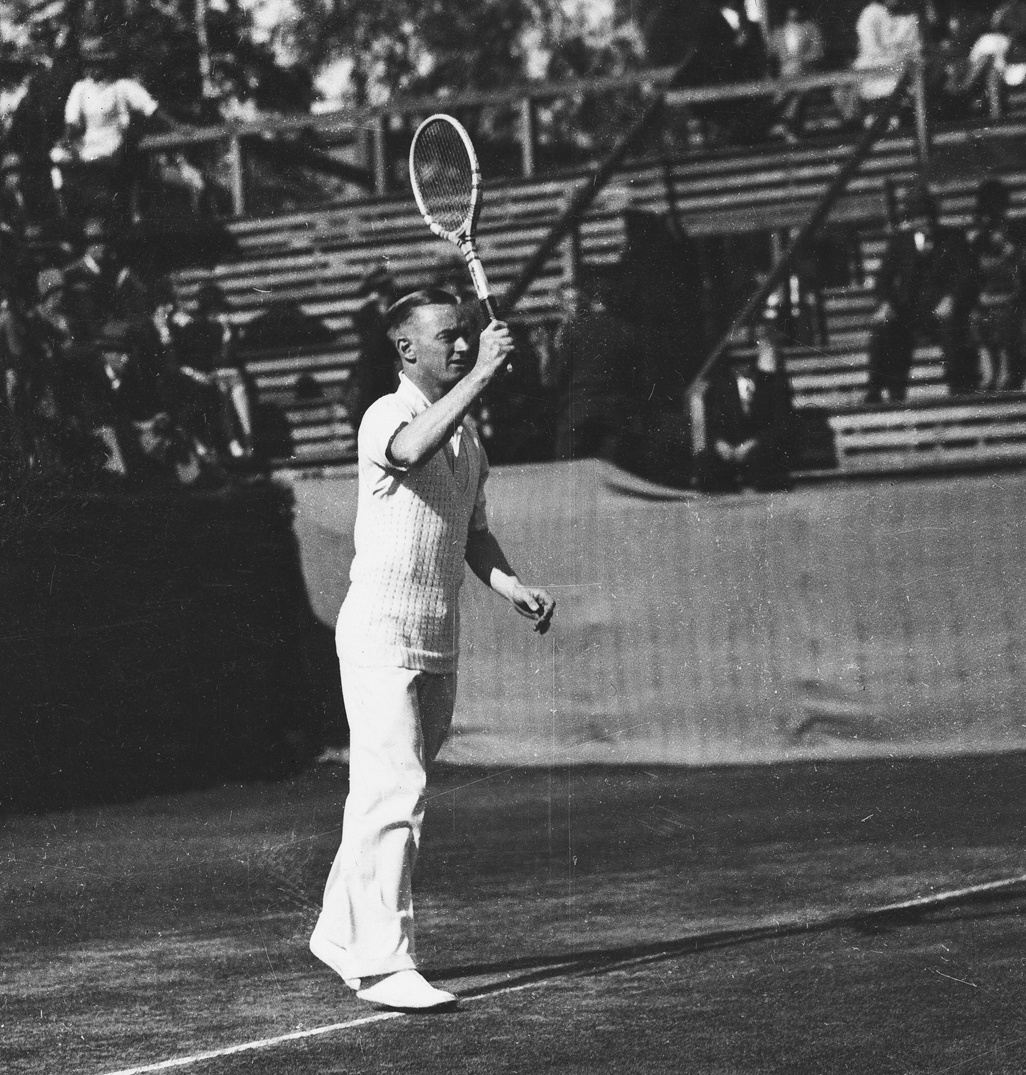
Hopman in Brisbane in 1931

Hopman was the successful captain-coach of 22 Australian Davis Cup teams from 1939 to 1967. With players such as Frank Sedgman, Ken McGregor, Lew Hoad, Ken Rosewall, Rod Laver, Neale Fraser, John Newcombe, Fred Stolle, Tony Roche, Roy Emerson, Ashley Cooper, Rex Hartwig, Mervyn Rose and Mal Anderson, he won the cup an unmatched 16 times.

In late 1951, when it appeared that Davis Cup player Frank Sedgman was about to turn professional, Hopman used his column in the Melbourne Herald to lead a fundraising campaign designed to keep Sedgman in the amateur ranks. Enough money was raised to purchase a petrol station in the name of Sedgman's wife-to-be and Sedgman remained an amateur for one more year. As Joe McCauley writes in The History of Professional Tennis, "For some reason, the pious Hopman, a strong opponent of the paid game, did not regard this as an infringement of Sedgman's amateur status."

== Journalism ==
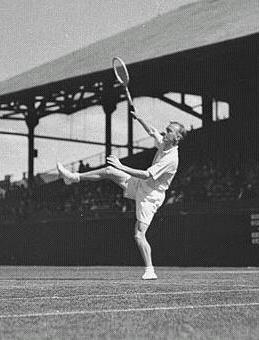
Hopman hitting an overhead in the 1930s

Hopman was also a journalist, joining the Melbourne Herald in 1933 as a sportswriter. He provided sporting commentary. After World War II, this became his focus until he was once again coaxed into tennis coaching. As an example of Hopman's journalism, Kramer writes that Sedgman, by then a successful touring professional, once "volunteered to help train the Aussie Davis Cup team. Hopman accepted the offer, and then he took Sedg aside and told him that what Hoad and Rosewall needed was confidence. So he told Sedg to go easy on them, which he gladly did. After a few days, Hopman wrote an exclusive in his newspaper column revealing how his kids could whip Sedgman and how this proved once again that amateurs were better than the pros."

== Legacy ==
The Hopman Cup was named in his honour. Until her death in mid-2018, his widow Lucy Hopman travelled to Perth, Western Australia each year for the tournament.

Hopman was inducted into the International Tennis Hall of Fame in Newport, Rhode Island, in 1978.

Tennis great Jack Kramer, who was also a successful promoter of the professional tour, writes in his 1979 autobiography that Hopman "always knew exactly what was going on with all his amateurs. He had no children, no hobbies, and tennis was everything to him. Hopman always said he hated the pros, and he battled open tennis to the bitter end, but as early as the time when Sedgman and McGregor signed, Hopman was trying to get himself included in the deal so he could get a job with pro tennis in America."

Kramer, who admits that Hopman "has never been my favorite guy", goes on to say: "The minute one of his stars would turn pro, Hopman would turn on him. No matter how close he'd been to a player, as soon as he was out of Hopman's control, the guy was an outcast. 'It was as if we'd never existed' Rosewall said once."

== Personal life ==
Hopman was first married to Nell Hall, with whom he won four mixed doubles finals. The marriage took place on 19 March 1934 at St Philip's Anglican Church in Sydney. She died of an intracranial tumour on 10 January 1968. Hopman emigrated to the United States in 1969 and became a successful professional coach, at Port Washington Tennis Academy, of future champions such as Vitas Gerulaitis and later John McEnroe. Hopman later opened the Harry Hopman's International Tennis camp in Treasure Island then Largo, Florida, with his second wife, Lucy Pope Fox, whom he married on 2 February 1971. One more tennis camp followed in Bologna (Italy)

He was appointed Member of the Order of the British Empire (MBE) in the 1951 New Year Honours for services to sport, and promoted to Commander of the Order (CBE) in the 1956 New Year Honours, again for services to sport (particularly tennis).

Hopman died of a heart attack on 27 December 1985.

== Tournament record ==
=== Australia Davis Cup ===
==== Player ====
- 1928, 1930, 1932

==== Captain ====
- 1938–1939, 1950–1969
  - Winner: 1939, 1950–1953, 1955–1957, 1959–1962, 1964–1967
  - Runner-up: 1938, 1954, 1958, 1963, 1968

=== Italian Championship ===
- Mixed Doubles 1934

== Grand Slam finals ==
=== Singles: 3 (3 runner-ups) ===
Result	Year	Championship	Surface	Opponent	Score
Loss	1930	Australian Championships	Grass	(Australia) Edgar Moon	3–6, 1–6, 3–6
Loss	1931	Australian Championships	Grass	(Australia) Jack Crawford	4–6, 2–6, 6–2, 1–6
Loss	1932	Australian Championships	Grass	(Australia) Jack Crawford	4–6, 6–3, 3–6, 6–3, 6–1

=== Doubles: 7 (2 titles, 5 runner-ups) ===
Result	Year	Championship	Surface	Partner	Opponents	Score
Win	1929	Australian Championships	Grass	(Australia) Jack Crawford	(Australia) Jack Cummings (Australia) Edgar Moon	6–1, 6–8, 4–6, 6–1, 6–3
Win	1930	Australian Championships	Grass	(Australia) Jack Crawford	(Australia) Tim Fitchett (Australia) John Hawkes	8–6, 6–1, 2–6, 6–3
Loss	1930	French Championships	Clay	(Australia) Jim Willard	(France) Henri Cochet (France) Jacques Brugnon	3–6, 7–8, 3–6
Loss	1931	Australian Championships	Grass	(Australia) Jack Crawford	(Australia) James Anderson (Australia) Norman Brookes	2–6, 4–6, 3–6
Loss	1932	Australian Championships	Grass	(Australia) Gerald Patterson	(Australia) Jack Crawford (Australia) Edgar Moon	10–12, 3–6, 6–4, 4–6
Loss	1939	US Championships	Grass	(Australia) Jack Crawford	(Australia) Adrian Quist (Australia) John Bromwich	6–8, 1–6, 4–6
Loss	1948	French Championships	Clay	(Australia) Frank Sedgman	(Sweden) Lennart Bergelin (Czechoslovakia) Jaroslav Drobný	6–8, 1–6, 10–12

=== Mixed doubles: 8 (5 titles, 3 runner-ups) ===
Result	Year	Championship	Surface	Partner	Opponents	Score
Win	1930	Australian Championships	Grass	(Australia) Nell Hall Hopman	(Australia) Marjorie Cox Crawford (Australia) Jack Crawford	11–9, 3–6, 6–3
Loss	1932	Wimbledon Championships	Grass	(Belgium) Josane Sigart	(United States) Elizabeth Ryan (Spain) Enrique Maier	5–7, 2–6
Loss	1935	Wimbledon Championships	Grass	(Australia) Nell Hall Hopman	(United Kingdom) Dorothy Round Little (United Kingdom) Fred Perry	5–7, 6–4, 2–6
Win	1936	Australian Championships	Grass	(Australia) Nell Hall Hopman	(Australia) May Blick (Australia) Abe Kay	6–2, 6–0
Win	1937	Australian Championships	Grass	(Australia) Nell Hall Hopman	(Australia) Dorothy Stevenson (Australia) Don Turnbull	3–6, 6–3, 6–2
Win	1939	Australian Championships	Grass	(Australia) Nell Hall Hopman	(Australia) Margaret Wilson (Australia) John Bromwich	6–8, 6–2, 6–3
Win	1939	US Championships	Grass	(United States) Alice Marble	(United States) Sarah Palfrey Cooke (United States) Elwood Cooke	9–7, 6–1
Loss	1940	Australian Championships	Grass	(Australia) Nell Hall Hopman	(Australia) Nancye Wynne Bolton (Australia) Colin Long	5–7, 6–2, 4–6

== Grand Slam singles performance timeline ==
Key
W	F	SF	QF	#R	RR	Q#	DNQ	A	NH

(W) winner; (F) finalist; (SF) semifinalist; (QF) quarterfinalist; (#R) rounds 4, 3, 2, 1; (RR) round-robin stage; (Q#) qualification round; (DNQ) did not qualify; (A) absent; (NH) not held; (SR) strike rate (events won / competed); (W–L) win–loss record.

Tournament	1926	1927	1928	1929	1930	1931	1932	1933	1934	1935	1936	1937	1938	1939	1940	1941	1942	1943	1944	1945	1946	1947	1948	1949	1950	1951	1952	1953	SR	W–L	Win %
Australia	3R	2R	QF	SF	F	F	F	QF	QF	3R	SF	SF	3R	QF	QF	NH	NH	NH	NH	NH	QF	1R	2R	3R	3R	2R	A	A	0 / 21	39–20	66.1
France	A	A	2R	A	QF	A	A	A	4R	4R	A	A	A	A	NH	NH	NH	NH	NH	NH	A	A	2R	A	3R	A	1R	2R	0 / 8	10–6	62.5
Wimbledon	A	A	2R	A	3R	A	3R	A	4R	4R	A	A	A	A	NH	NH	NH	NH	NH	NH	2R	A	2R	A	3R	A	1R	A	0 / 9	15–9	62.5
United States	A	A	1R	A	A	A	A	A	A	A	A	A	QF	QF	A	A	A	A	A	A	2R	A	2R	A	2R	A	A	A	0 / 6	9–6	60.0
Win–loss	1–1	0–1	3–4	3–1	9–3	4–1	6–2	2–1	7–3	6–3	3–1	3–1	4–2	5–2	2–1	0–0	0–0	0–0	0–0	0–0	4–3	0–0	3–4	1–1	6–4	1–1	0–1	0–0	0 / 44	73–41	64.0

== Sources ==
- The Game, My 40 Years in Tennis (1979), Jack Kramer with Frank Deford (ISBN 0-399-12336-9)
- The History of Professional Tennis (2003), Joe McCauley
- Rich Hillway, tennis historian
