= John Hawkes (tennis) =

Australian tennis player (1899–1990)

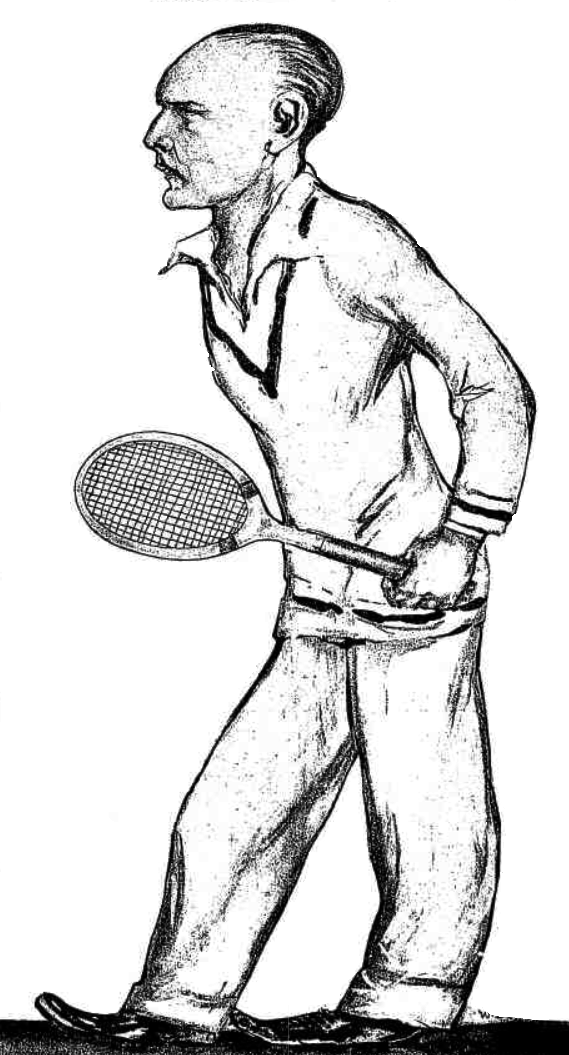
- 1927 caricature by Reynolds
- Full name: John Bailey Hawkes
- Country (sports): Australia
- Born: 7 June 1899; Geelong, Australia
- Died: 31 March 1990 (aged 90); Geelong, Australia
- Turned pro: 1921 (amateur tour)
- Retired: 1932

Singles
- Highest ranking: No. 10 (1928, A. Wallis Myers)

Grand Slam singles results
- Australian Open: W (1926)
- French Open: SF (1928)
- Wimbledon: 2R (1928)
- US Open: 3R (1921)

Doubles

Grand Slam doubles results
- Australian Open: W (1922, 1926, 1927)
- Wimbledon: F (1928)

Mixed doubles

Grand Slam mixed doubles results
- Australian Open: W (1922, 1926, 1927)
- US Open: W (1925, 1928)

Team competitions
- Davis Cup: F (1921, 1923^{Ch}, 1925)

John Bailey Hawkes (7 June 1899 – 31 March 1990) was an Australian tennis player who won the singles title at the 1926 Australasian Championships and was ranked No. 10 in the world in 1928.

== Biography ==
Hawkes was raised and lived his life in and around Geelong, Victoria. Educated at The Geelong College from 1909 to 1919, he showed enormous potential as a young sportsman, having won the Victorian School Boys U19 tennis title for 5 years in a row – described by historian Graeme Kinross Smith as the "nursery for tennis talent". Hawkes had also been touted as a future test cricketer for Australia and was made a member of the MCC at the age of 13. He was captain of the first Cricket team for the last 4 years of his school life at The Geelong College and according to school website, "In a legendary day of bowling in 1916, Jack Hawkes was to claim 10 wickets in a match against Wesley College." Tennis, however, was to create a more powerful pull than cricket. Taught on the lawn court at the family home "Llanberis", overlooking Corio Bay by family friend Russell Keays and influenced by tennis legend and family friend, Norman Brookes, Jack's career blossomed in the 1920s. The left-hander won a clean sweep at the Australasian Championships of 1926, winning the men's singles, men's doubles and mixed doubles in the same year. Hawkes had five championship points in a marathon singles final against his doubles partner Gerald Patterson in the Australian Championships in 1927, but went on to lose the match in five sets. Hawkes also won two US mixed doubles titles, won a total of three Australian doubles titles with Gerald Patterson and was runner-up with Gerald Patterson in Wimbledon doubles and US doubles of 1928. Hawkes also won a total of three mixed doubles Australian championships.

Hawkes was a three-times Davis Cup representative in 1921, 1923, 1925 and was controversially omitted from the team in the year of his Australian Open crown in 1926 and successful overseas tour of 1928. After his retirement from tennis, Hawkes was actively involved in tennis administration and ran the family business Hawkes Brothers, in Geelong until his retirement in the early 1970s. Jack Hawkes retired to Ocean Grove (where he had holidayed as a child at the family's beachside home "Imbool"), and later to Barwon Heads before his death in Geelong, at the age of 90 after a short illness, on 31 March 1990. He was survived by his wife Mickey and their four children; Ann, Sally, Sue and John.

== Grand Slam finals ==
=== Singles: 2 (1 title, 1 runner-up) ===
Result	Year	Championship	Surface	Opponent	Score
Win	1926	Australasian Championships	Grass	(Australia) James Willard	6–1, 6–3, 6–1
Loss	1927	Australian Championships	Grass	(Australia) Gerald Patterson	6–3, 4–6, 6–3, 16–18, 3–6

=== Doubles: 7 (3 titles, 4 runners-up) ===
Result	Year	Championship	Surface	Partner	Opponents	Score
Win	1922	Australasian Championships	Grass	(Australia) Gerald Patterson	(Australia) James Anderson (Australia) Norman Peach	8–10, 6–0, 6–0, 7–5
Loss	1925	U.S. Championships	Grass	(Australia) Gerald Patterson	(United States) R. Norris Williams (United States) Vincent Richards	2–6, 10–8, 4–6, 9–11
Win	1926	Australasian Championships	Grass	(Australia) Gerald Patterson	(Australia) James Anderson (Australia) Pat O'Hara Wood	6–1, 6–4, 6–2
Win	1927	Australian Championships	Grass	(Australia) Gerald Patterson	(Australia) Pat O'Hara Wood (Australia) Ian McInness	8–6, 6–2, 6–1
Loss	1928	Wimbledon	Grass	(Australia) Gerald Patterson	(France) Jacques Brugnon (France) Henri Cochet	11–13, 4–6, 4–6
Loss	1928	U.S. Championships	Grass	(Australia) Gerald Patterson	(United States) John Hennessey (United States) George Lott	2–6, 1–6, 2–6
Loss	1930	Australian Championships	Grass	(Australia) Tim Fitchett	(Australia) Jack Crawford (Australia) Harry Hopman	6–8, 1–6, 6–2, 3–6

=== Mixed doubles: 7 (5 titles, 2 runners-up) ===
Result	Year	Championship	Surface	Partner	Opponents	Score
Win	1922	Australasian Championships	Grass	(Australia) Esna Boyd	(Australia) Gwen Utz (Australia) Harold Utz	6–1, 6–1
Loss	1923	U.S. Championships	Grass	(United Kingdom) Kitty McKane	(United States) Molla Bjurstedt Mallory (United States) Bill Tilden	3–6, 6–2, 8–10
Win	1925	U.S. Championships	Grass	(United Kingdom) Kitty McKane	(United Kingdom) Ermyntrude Harvey (United States) Vincent Richards	6–2, 6–4
Win	1926	Australasian Championships	Grass	(Australia) Esna Boyd	(Australia) Daphne Akhurst (Australia) James Willard	6–1, 6–4
Win	1927	Australian Championships	Grass	(Australia) Esna Boyd	(Australia) Youtha Anthony (Australia) James Willard	6–1, 6–3
Loss	1928	Australian Championships	Grass	(Australia) Esna Boyd	(Australia) Daphne Akhurst (France) Jean Borotra	walkover
Win	1928	U.S. Championships	Grass	(United States) Helen Wills	(United States) Edith Cross (Australia) Edgar Moon	6–1, 6–3
