= 1932 in tennis =

This page covers all the important events in the sport of tennis in 1932. It provides the results of notable tournaments throughout the year on both the men's and women's ILTF tennis circuits.

== Australian Open ==
Category	Champion(s)	Finalist(s)	Score
Men's singles	(Australia) Jack Crawford	(Australia) Harry Hopman	4–6, 6–3, 3–6, 6–3, 6–1
Women's singles	(Australia) Coral McInnes Buttsworth	(Australia) Kathleen Le Messurier	9–7, 6–4
Men's doubles	(Australia) Jack Crawford (Australia) Gar Moon	(Australia) Harry Hopman (Australia) Gerald Patterson	4–6, 6–4, 12–10, 6–3
Women's doubles	(Australia) Coral McInnes Buttsworth (Australia) Marjorie Cox Crawford	(Australia) Kathleen Le Messurier (Australia) Dorothy Weston	6–2, 6–2
Mixed doubles	(Australia) Marjorie Cox Crawford (Australia) Jack Crawford	(Australia) Meryl O'Hara Wood (Japan) Jiro Sato	6–8, 8–6, 6–3

== French Open ==
Category	Champion(s)	Finalist(s)	Score
Men's singles	(France) Henri Cochet	(Italy) Giorgio de Stefani	6–0, 6–4, 4–6, 6–3
Women's singles	(United States) Helen Wills Moody	(France) Simonne Mathieu	7–5, 6–1
Men's doubles	(France) Henri Cochet (France) Jacques Brugnon	(France) Christian Boussus (France) Marcel Bernard	6–4, 3–6, 7–5, 6–3
Women's doubles	(United States) Helen Wills Moody (United States) Elizabeth Ryan	(United Kingdom) Betty Nuthall (United Kingdom) Eileen Bennett Whittingstall	6–1, 6–3
Mixed doubles	(United Kingdom) Betty Nuthall (United Kingdom) Fred Perry	(United States) Helen Wills Moody (United States) Sidney Wood	6–4, 6–2

== Wimbledon ==
Category	Champion(s)	Finalist(s)	Score
Men's singles	(United States) Ellsworth Vines	(United Kingdom) Bunny Austin	6–4, 6–2, 6–0
Women's singles	(United States) Helen Moody	(United States) Helen Jacobs	6–3, 6–1
Men's doubles	(France) Jean Borotra (France) Jacques Brugnon	(United Kingdom) Pat Hughes (United Kingdom) Fred Perry	6–0, 4–6, 3–6, 7–5, 7–5
Women's doubles	(France) Doris Metaxa (Belgium) Josane Sigart	(United States) Helen Jacobs (United States) Elizabeth Ryan	6–4, 6–3
Mixed doubles	(Spain) Enrique Maier (United States) Elizabeth Ryan	(Australia) Harry Hopman (Belgium) Josane Sigart	7–5, 6–2

== US Open ==
Category	Champion(s)	Finalist(s)	Score
Men's singles	(United States) Ellsworth Vines	(France) Henri Cochet	6–4, 6–4, 6–4
Women's singles	(United States) Helen Jacobs	(United States) Carolin Babcock	6–2, 6–2
Men's doubles	(United States) Ellsworth Vines (United States) Keith Gledhill	(United States) Wilmer Allison (United States) John Van Ryn	6–4, 6–3, 6–2
Women's doubles	(United States) Helen Jacobs (United States) Sarah Palfrey	(United States) Alice Marble (United States) Marjorie Morrill	8–6, 6–1
Mixed doubles	(United States) Sarah Palfrey (United Kingdom) Fred Perry	(United States) Helen Jacobs (United States) Ellsworth Vines	6–3, 7–5
