= 1928 in tennis =

This page covers all the important events in the sport of tennis in 1928. It provides the results of notable tournaments throughout the year on both the men's and women's ILTF tennis circuits.

== Australian Open ==
Category	Champion(s)	Finalist(s)	Score
Men's singles	(France) Jean Borotra	(Australia) Jack Cummings	6–4, 6–1, 4–6, 5–7, 6–3
Women's singles	(Australia) Daphne Akhurst	(Australia) Esna Boyd	7–5, 6–2
Men's doubles	(France) Jean Borotra (France) Jacques Brugnon	(Australia) Gar Moon (Australia) Jim Willard	6–2, 4–6, 6–4, 6–4
Women's doubles	(Australia) Daphne Akhurst (Australia) Esna Boyd	(Australia) Kathleen Le Messurier (Australia) Dorothy Weston	6–3, 6–1
Mixed doubles	(Australia) Daphne Akhurst (France) Jean Borotra	(Australia) Esna Boyd (Australia) Jack Hawkes	walkover

== French Open ==
Category	Champion(s)	Finalist(s)	Score
Men's singles	(France) Henri Cochet	(France) René Lacoste	5–7, 6–3, 6–1, 6–3
Women's singles	(United States) Helen Wills	(United Kingdom) Eileen Bennett	6–1, 6–2
Men's doubles	(France) Jean Borotra (France) Jacques Brugnon	(France) Henri Cochet (France) René de Buzelet	6–4, 3–6, 6–2, 3–6, 6–4
Women's doubles	(United Kingdom) Phoebe Holcroft Watson (United Kingdom) Eileen Bennett Whittingstall	(France) Suzanne Devé (France) Sylvie Lafaurie	6–0, 6–2
Mixed doubles	(United Kingdom) Eileen Bennett Whittingstall (France) Henri Cochet	(United States) Helen Wills (United States) Frank Hunter	3–6, 6–3, 6–3

== Wimbledon ==
Category	Champion(s)	Finalist(s)	Score
Men's singles	(France) René Lacoste	(France) Henri Cochet	6–1, 4–6, 6–4, 6–2
Women's singles	(United States) Helen Wills	(Spain) Lilí de Álvarez	6–2, 6–3
Men's doubles	(France) Jacques Brugnon (France) Henri Cochet	(Australia) John Hawkes (Australia) Gerald Patterson	13–11, 6–4, 6–4
Women's doubles	(United Kingdom) Peggy Saunders (United Kingdom) Phoebe Watson	(United Kingdom) Eileen Bennett (United Kingdom) Ermyntrude Harvey	6–2, 6–3
Mixed doubles	(South Africa) Pat Spence (United States) Elizabeth Ryan	(Australia) Jack Crawford (Australia) Daphne Akhurst	7–5, 6–4

== US Open ==
Category	Champion(s)	Finalist(s)	Score
Men's singles	(France) Henri Cochet	(United States) Francis Hunter	4–6, 6–4, 3–6, 7–5, 6–3
Women's singles	(United States) Helen Wills	(United States) Helen Jacobs	6–2, 6–1
Men's doubles	(United States) George Lott (United States) John Hennessey	(Australia) Gerald Patterson (Australia) Jack Hawkes	6–2, 6–1, 6–2
Women's doubles	(United States) Hazel Hotchkiss Wightman (United States) Helen Wills	(United States) Edith Cross (United States) Anna McCune Harper	6–2, 6–2
Mixed doubles	(United States) Helen Wills (Australia) Jack Hawkes	(United States) Edith Cross (Australia) Edgar Moon	6–1, 6–3
