= 1932 Australian Championships – Mixed doubles =

Mixed doubles
- 1932 Australian Championships

Final
- Champions: (Australia) Marjorie Crawford (Australia) Jack Crawford
- Runners-up: (Australia) Meryl O'Hara Wood (Japan) Jiro Sato
- Score: 6–8, 8–6, 6–3

Details
- Draw: 20
- Seeds: 4

Events
| Singles | men | women | | boys | girls |
| Doubles | men | women | mixed | boys | girls |
- Australian Championships

Marjorie Crawford and Jack Crawford successfully defended their title by defeating Meryl O'Hara Wood and Jiro Sato 6–8, 8–6, 6–3 in the final, to win the mixed doubles tennis title at the 1932 Australian Championships.

This match was scheduled to be the sole Final for Friday, 12 February but – because of falling light – remain unfinished that day with the score at one set all. The deciding set was played the next day following on the Singles and before the Doubles finals.

== Seeds ==
1. (Australia) Marjorie Crawford / (Australia) Jack Crawford (champions)
2. n/a (Note: Originally the second seeds were Takeichi Harada and Esna Boyd Robertson but the latter withdrew from the tournament because of serious illness and – ultimately – death of her mother on the eve of the event.)
3. (Australia) Meryl O'Hara Wood / (Japan) Jiro Sato (final)
4. (Australia) Coral Buttsworth / (Australia) Charles Donohoe (semifinals)

== Draw ==
Key

- Q = Qualifier
- WC = Wild card
- LL = Lucky loser
- Alt = Alternate
- ITF = ITF entry
- PR = Protected ranking
- SR = Special ranking
- SE = Special exempt
- JE = Junior exempt
- JR = Junior Accelerator Programme entrant
- CO = College Accelerator Programme entrant
- NG = Next Gen Accelerator Program entrant
- w/o = Walkover
- r = Retired
- d = Defaulted

=== Finals ===
Quarterfinals
(Australia) Gwen Stevenson (Australia) Bert Tonkin | 6 | 4 | 7
(Australia) Mollie McGrath (Australia) Cliff Harvey | 4 | 6 | 5
3 | (Australia) Meryl O'Hara Wood (Japan) Jiro Sato | 6 | 6
(Australia) Nancy Lewis (Australia) Aubrey Willard | 3 | 2
1 | (Australia) Marjorie Crawford (Australia) Jack Crawford | w/o
(Australia) Kathleen Le Messurier (Australia) Don Turnbull (Note: Turnbull withdrew due to illness.)
(Australia) Edna Lawrence (Australia) Ron Hone | 4 | 5
4 | (Australia) Coral Buttsworth (Australia) Charles Donohoe | 6 | 7

Semifinals
(Australia) Gwen Stevenson (Australia) Bert Tonkin | 2 | 6 | 2
3 | (Australia) Meryl O'Hara Wood (Japan) Jiro Sato | 6 | 4 | 6
1 | (Australia) Marjorie Crawford (Australia) Jack Crawford | 6 | 6
4 | (Australia) Coral Buttsworth (Australia) Charles Donohoe | 3 | 2

Final
3 | (Australia) Meryl O'Hara Wood (Japan) Jiro Sato | 8 | 6 | 3
1 | (Australia) Marjorie Crawford (Australia) Jack Crawford | 6 | 8 | 6

=== Earlier rounds ===
==== Section 1 ====
First round
(Australia) Nancy Lewis (Australia) Aubrey Willard | 8 | 7 | 6
(Australia) Emily Hood Westacott (Australia) Gar Moon | 6 | 9 | 3
(Australia) Gwen Griffiths (Australia) Jack Hawkes | 6 | 1 | 6
(Australia) Dorothy Anderson (Australia) Clifford Sproule | 4 | 6 | 3

Second round
(Australia) Gwen Stevenson (Australia) Bert Tonkin | 2 | 6 | 6
(Australia) Edna Collison (Japan) Takeichi Harada | 6 | 4 | 4
(Australia) Mollie McGrath (Australia) Cliff Harvey | 6 | 6
(Australia) Christabel Finlayson (Australia) Rupert Shepherd | 2 | 1
3 | (Australia) Meryl O'Hara Wood (Japan) Jiro Sato | 6 | 6
(Australia) Dorothy Weston (Australia) Ernest Rowe | 2 | 0
(Australia) Nancy Lewis (Australia) Aubrey Willard | 4 | 6 | 7
(Australia) Gwen Griffiths (Australia) Jack Hawkes | 6 | 4 | 5

Quarterfinals
(Australia) Gwen Stevenson (Australia) Bert Tonkin | 6 | 4 | 7
(Australia) Mollie McGrath (Australia) Cliff Harvey | 4 | 6 | 5
3 | (Australia) Meryl O'Hara Wood (Japan) Jiro Sato | 6 | 6
(Australia) Nancy Lewis (Australia) Aubrey Willard | 3 | 2

Semifinals
(Australia) Gwen Stevenson (Australia) Bert Tonkin | 2 | 6 | 2
3 | (Australia) Meryl O'Hara Wood (Japan) Jiro Sato | 6 | 4 | 6

==== Section 2 ====
First round
1 | (Australia) Marjorie Crawford (Australia) Jack Crawford | 6 | 6
(Australia) Dot Stevenson (Australia) Reg Ewin | 2 | 3
(Australia) Joyce Williams (Australia) Gar Hone | 6 | 6
(Australia) Joyce Lillecrapp (Australia) Robert Barbour | 4 | 3

Second round
1 | (Australia) Marjorie Crawford (Australia) Jack Crawford | 6 | 6
(Australia) Joyce Williams (Australia) Gar Hone | 2 | 1
(Australia) Kathleen Le Messurier (Australia) Don Turnbull | 6 | 6
(Australia) Truda Cox (Australia) Allan Knight | 1 | 4
(Australia) Edna Lawrence (Australia) Ron Hone | 8 | 6
(Australia) Frances Hoddle-Wrigley (Japan) Ryosuke Nunoi | 6 | 3
4 | (Australia) Coral Buttsworth (Australia) Charles Donohoe | 4 | 8 | 6
(Australia) Florence Francisco (Australia) Jack Cummings | 6 | 6 | 2

Quarterfinals
1 | (Australia) Marjorie Crawford (Australia) Jack Crawford | w/o
(Australia) Kathleen Le Messurier (Australia) Don Turnbull
(Australia) Edna Lawrence (Australia) Ron Hone | 4 | 5
4 | (Australia) Coral Buttsworth (Australia) Charles Donohoe | 6 | 7

Semifinals
1 | (Australia) Marjorie Crawford (Australia) Jack Crawford | 6 | 6
4 | (Australia) Coral Buttsworth (Australia) Charles Donohoe | 3 | 2
