= List of Australian Open mixed doubles champions =

This is a list of all the champions of the mixed doubles event for the Australian Open tennis tournament.

== Champions ==
=== Australasian Championships ===
Year	Champions	Runners-up	Score
1922	(Australia) Esna Boyd Robertson (Australia) Jack Hawkes	(Australia) Gwen Utz (Australia) Harold Utz	6–1, 6–1
1923	(Australia) Sylvia Lance Harper (Australia) Horace Rice	(Australia) Margaret Molesworth (Australia) Bert St. John	2–6, 6–4, 6–4
1924	(Australia) Daphne Akhurst Cozens (Australia) Jim Willard	(Australia) Esna Boyd Robertson (Australia) Garton Hone	6–3, 6–4
1925	(Australia) Daphne Akhurst Cozens (Australia) Jim Willard	(Australia) Sylvia Lance Harper (Australia) Bob Schlesinger	6–4, 6–4
1926	(Australia) Esna Boyd Robertson (Australia) Jack Hawkes	(Australia) Daphne Akhurst Cozens (Australia) Jim Willard	6–2, 6–4

=== Australian Championships ===
Year	Champions	Runners-up	Score
1927	(Australia) Esna Boyd Robertson (Australia) Jack Hawkes	(Australia) Youtha Anthony (Australia) Jim Willard	6–1, 6–3
1928	(Australia) Daphne Akhurst Cozens (France) Jean Borotra	(Australia) Esna Boyd Robertson (Australia) Jack Hawkes	walkover
1929	(Australia) Daphne Akhurst Cozens (Australia) Edgar Moon	(Australia) Marjorie Cox Crawford (Australia) Jack Crawford	6–0, 7–5
1930	(Australia) Nell Hall Hopman (Australia) Harry Hopman	(Australia) Marjorie Cox Crawford (Australia) Jack Crawford	11–9, 3–6, 6–3
1931	(Australia) Marjorie Cox Crawford (Australia) Jack Crawford	(Australia) Emily Hood Westacott (Australia) Aubrey Willard	7–5, 6–4
1932	(Australia) Marjorie Cox Crawford (Australia) Jack Crawford	(Australia) Meryl O'Hara Wood (Japan) Jiro Sato	6–8, 8–6, 6–3
1933	(Australia) Marjorie Cox Crawford (Australia) Jack Crawford	(United States) Marjorie Gladman Van Ryn (United States) Ellsworth Vines	3–6, 7–5, 13–11
1934	(Australia) Joan Hartigan (Australia) Edgar Moon	(Australia) Emily Hood Westacott (Australia) Ray Dunlop	6–3, 6–4
1935	(Australia) Louise Bickerton (France) Christian Boussus	(Australia) Birdie Bond (South Africa) Vernon Kirby	1–6, 6–3, 6–3
1936	(Australia) Nell Hall Hopman (Australia) Harry Hopman	(Australia) May Blick (Australia) Abe Kay	6–2, 6–0
1937	(Australia) Nell Hall Hopman (Australia) Harry Hopman	(Australia) Dorothy Stevenson (Australia) Don Turnbull	3–6, 6–3, 6–2
1938	(Australia) Margaret Wilson (Australia) John Bromwich	(Australia) Nancye Wynne Bolton (Australia) Colin Long	6–3, 6–2
1939	(Australia) Nell Hall Hopman (Australia) Harry Hopman	(Australia) Margaret Wilson (Australia) John Bromwich	6–8, 6–2, 6–3
1940	(Australia) Nancye Wynne Bolton (Australia) Colin Long	(Australia) Nell Hall Hopman (Australia) Harry Hopman	7–5, 2–6, 6–4
1941	No competition (due to World War II) (Note: The tournament was not held from 1941 to 1945 because of World War II.)		
1942	No competition (due to World War II)		
1943	No competition (due to World War II)		
1944	No competition (due to World War II)		
1945	No competition (due to World War II)		
1946	(Australia) Nancye Wynne Bolton (Australia) Colin Long	(Australia) Joyce Fitch (Australia) John Bromwich	6–0, 6–4
1947	(Australia) Nancye Wynne Bolton (Australia) Colin Long	(Australia) Joyce Fitch (Australia) John Bromwich	6–3, 6–3
1948	(Australia) Nancye Wynne Bolton (Australia) Colin Long	(Australia) Thelma Coyne Long (Australia) Bill Sidwell	7–5, 4–6, 8–6
1949	(United States) Doris Hart (Australia) Frank Sedgman	(Australia) Joyce Fitch (Australia) John Bromwich	6–1, 5–7, 12–10
1950	(United States) Doris Hart (Australia) Frank Sedgman	(Australia) Joyce Fitch (South Africa) Eric Sturgess	8–6, 6–4
1951	(Australia) Thelma Coyne Long (Australia) George Worthington	(Australia) Clare Proctor (Australia) Jack May	6–4, 3–6, 6–2
1952	(Australia) Thelma Coyne Long (Australia) George Worthington	(Australia) Gwen Thiele (Australia) Tom Warhurst	9–7, 7–5
1953	(United States) Julia Sampson Hayward (Australia) Rex Hartwig	(United States) Maureen Connolly (United States) Ham Richardson	6–4, 6–3
1954	(Australia) Thelma Coyne Long (Australia) Rex Hartwig	(Australia) Beryl Penrose (Australia) John Bromwich	4–6, 6–1, 6–2
1955	(Australia) Thelma Coyne Long (Australia) George Worthington	(Australia) Jenny Staley (Australia) Lew Hoad	6–2, 6–1
1956	(Australia) Beryl Penrose (Australia) Neale Fraser	(Australia) Mary Bevis Hawton (Australia) Roy Emerson	6–2, 6–4
1957	(Australia) Fay Muller (Australia) Mal Anderson	(Australia) Jill Langley (United Kingdom) Billy Knight	7–5, 3–6, 6–1
1958	(Australia) Mary Bevis Hawton (Australia) Bob Howe	(United Kingdom) Angela Mortimer Barrett (Australia) Peter Newman	9–11, 6–1, 6–2
1959	(South Africa) Sandra Reynolds Price (Australia) Bob Mark	(South Africa) Renée Schuurman (Australia) Rod Laver	4–6, 13–11, 6–1
1960	(Australia) Jan Lehane O'Neill (South Africa) Trevor Fancutt	(Australia) Mary Carter Reitano (Australia) Bob Mark	6–2, 7–5
1961	(Australia) Jan Lehane O'Neill (Australia) Bob Hewitt	(Australia) Mary Carter Reitano (Australia) John Pearce	9–7, 6–2
1962	(Australia) Lesley Turner Bowrey (Australia) Fred Stolle	(United States) Darlene Hard (United Kingdom) Roger Taylor	6–3, 9–7
1963	(Australia) Margaret Smith Court (Australia) Ken Fletcher	(Australia) Lesley Turner Bowrey (Australia) Fred Stolle	7–5, 5–7, 6–4
1964	(Australia) Margaret Smith Court (Australia) Ken Fletcher	(Australia) Jan Lehane O'Neill (United Kingdom) Mike Sangster	6–3, 6–2
1965	(Australia) Robyn Ebbern (Australia) Owen Davidson and (Australia) Margaret Smith Court (Australia) John Newcombe		Final match not played, title shared.
1966	(Australia) Judy Tegart Dalton (Australia) Tony Roche	(Australia) Robyn Ebbern (Australia) Bill Bowrey	6–1, 6–3
1967	(Australia) Lesley Turner Bowrey (Australia) Owen Davidson	(Australia) Judy Tegart Dalton (Australia) Tony Roche	9–7, 6–4
1968	(United States) Billie Jean King (Australia) Dick Crealy	(Australia) Margaret Smith Court (Australia) Allan Stone	walkover

=== Australian Open ===
Year	Champions	Runners-up	Score
1969	(Australia) Margaret Smith Court (United States) Marty Riessen and (United Kingdom) Ann Haydon-Jones (Australia) Fred Stolle		Final match not played, title shared.
1970	No competition		
1971	No competition		
1972	No competition		
1973	No competition		
1974	No competition		
1975	No competition		
1976	No competition		
1977	No competition		
1978	No competition		
1979	No competition		
1980	No competition		
1981	No competition		
1982	No competition		
1983	No competition		
1984	No competition		
1985	No competition		
1986	No competition		
1987	(United States) Zina Garrison (United States) Sherwood Stewart	(United Kingdom) Anne Hobbs (United Kingdom) Andrew Castle	3–6, 7–6^{(7–5)}, 6–3
1988	(Czechoslovakia) Jana Novotná (United States) Jim Pugh	(United States) Martina Navratilova (United States) Tim Gullikson	5–7, 6–2, 6–4
1989	(Czechoslovakia) Jana Novotná (United States) Jim Pugh	(United States) Zina Garrison (United States) Sherwood Stewart	6–3, 6–4
1990	(Soviet Union) Natalia Zvereva (United States) Jim Pugh	(United States) Zina Garrison (United States) Rick Leach	4–6, 6–2, 6–3
1991	(United Kingdom) Jo Durie (United Kingdom) Jeremy Bates	(United States) Robin White (United States) Scott Davis	2–6, 6–4, 6–4
1992	(Australia) Nicole Provis (Australia) Mark Woodforde	(Spain) Arantxa Sánchez Vicario (Australia) Todd Woodbridge	6–3, 4–6, 11–9
1993	(Spain) Arantxa Sánchez Vicario (Australia) Todd Woodbridge	(United States) Zina Garrison Jackson (United States) Rick Leach	7–5, 6–4
1994	(Latvia) Larisa Savchenko Neiland (Russia) Andrei Olhovskiy	(Czech Republic) Helena Suková (Australia) Todd Woodbridge	7–5, 6–7^{(7–9)}, 6–2
1995	(Belarus) Natalia Zvereva (United States) Rick Leach	(United States) Gigi Fernández (Czech Republic) Cyril Suk	7–6^{(7–4)}, 6–7^{(3–7)}, 6–4
1996	(Latvia) Larisa Savchenko Neiland (Australia) Mark Woodforde	(United States) Nicole Arendt (United States) Luke Jensen	4–6, 7–5, 6–0
1997	(Netherlands) Manon Bollegraf (United States) Rick Leach	(Latvia) Larisa Savchenko Neiland (South Africa) John–Laffnie de Jager	6–3, 6–7^{(5–7)}, 7–5
1998	(United States) Venus Williams (United States) Justin Gimelstob	(Czech Republic) Helena Suková (Czech Republic) Cyril Suk	6–2, 6–1
1999	(South Africa) Mariaan de Swardt (South Africa) David Adams	(United States) Serena Williams (Belarus) Max Mirnyi	6–4, 4–6, 7–6^{(7–5)}
2000	(Australia) Rennae Stubbs (United States) Jared Palmer	(Spain) Arantxa Sánchez Vicario (Australia) Todd Woodbridge	7–5, 7–6^{(7–3)}
2001	(United States) Corina Morariu (South Africa) Ellis Ferreira	(Austria) Barbara Schett (Australia) Joshua Eagle	6–1, 6–3
2002	(Slovakia) Daniela Hantuchová (Zimbabwe) Kevin Ullyett	(Argentina) Paola Suárez (Argentina) Gastón Etlis	6–3, 6–2
2003	(United States) Martina Navratilova (India) Leander Paes	(Greece) Eleni Daniilidou (Australia) Todd Woodbridge	6–4, 7–5
2004	(Russia) Elena Bovina (Serbia and Montenegro) Nenad Zimonjić	(United States) Martina Navratilova (India) Leander Paes	6–1, 7–6^{(7–3)}
2005	(Australia) Samantha Stosur (Australia) Scott Draper	(South Africa) Liezel Huber (Zimbabwe) Kevin Ullyett	6–2, 2–6, 7–6^{(8–6)}
2006	(Switzerland) Martina Hingis (India) Mahesh Bhupathi	(Russia) Elena Likhovtseva (Canada) Daniel Nestor	6–3, 6–3
2007	(Russia) Elena Likhovtseva (Canada) Daniel Nestor	(Belarus) Victoria Azarenka (Belarus) Max Mirnyi	6–4, 6–4
2008	(China) Sun Tiantian (Serbia) Nenad Zimonjić	(India) Sania Mirza (India) Mahesh Bhupathi	7–6^{(7–4)}, 6–4
2009	(India) Sania Mirza (India) Mahesh Bhupathi	(France) Nathalie Dechy (Israel) Andy Ram	6–3, 6–1
2010	(Zimbabwe) Cara Black (India) Leander Paes	(Russia) Ekaterina Makarova (Czech Republic) Jaroslav Levinský	7–5, 6–3
2011	(Slovenia) Katarina Srebotnik (Canada) Daniel Nestor	(Chinese Taipei) Chan Yung-jan (Australia) Paul Hanley	6–3, 3–6, [10–7]
2012	(United States) Bethanie Mattek-Sands (Romania) Horia Tecău	(Russia) Elena Vesnina (India) Leander Paes	6–3, 5–7, [10–3]
2013	(Australia) Jarmila Gajdošová (Australia) Matthew Ebden	(Czech Republic) Lucie Hradecká (Czech Republic) František Čermák	6–3, 7–5
2014	(France) Kristina Mladenovic (Canada) Daniel Nestor	(India) Sania Mirza (Romania) Horia Tecău	6–3, 6–2
2015	(Switzerland) Martina Hingis (India) Leander Paes	(France) Kristina Mladenovic (Canada) Daniel Nestor	6–4, 6–3
2016	(Russia) Elena Vesnina (Brazil) Bruno Soares	(United States) Coco Vandeweghe (Romania) Horia Tecău	6–4, 4–6, [10–5]
2017	(United States) Abigail Spears (Colombia) Juan Sebastián Cabal	(India) Sania Mirza (Croatia) Ivan Dodig	6–2, 6–4
2018	(Canada) Gabriela Dabrowski (Croatia) Mate Pavić	(Hungary) Tímea Babos (India) Rohan Bopanna	2–6, 6–4, [11–9]
2019	(Czech Republic) Barbora Krejčíková (United States) Rajeev Ram	(Australia) Astra Sharma (Australia) John-Patrick Smith	7–6^{(7–3)}, 6–1
2020	(Czech Republic) Barbora Krejčíková (Croatia) Nikola Mektić	(United States) Bethanie Mattek-Sands (United Kingdom) Jamie Murray	5–7, 6–4, [10–1]
2021	(Czech Republic) Barbora Krejčíková (United States) Rajeev Ram	(Australia) Samantha Stosur (Australia) Matthew Ebden	6–2, 6–1
2022	(France) Kristina Mladenovic (Croatia) Ivan Dodig	(Australia) Jaimee Fourlis (Australia) Jason Kubler	6–3, 6–4
2023	(Brazil) Luisa Stefani (Brazil) Rafael Matos	(India) Sania Mirza (India) Rohan Bopanna	7–6^{(7–2)}, 6–2
2024	(Chinese Taipei) Hsieh Su-wei (Poland) Jan Zieliński	(United States) Desirae Krawczyk (United Kingdom) Neal Skupski	6–7^{(5–7)}, 6–4, [11–9]
2025	(Australia) Olivia Gadecki (Australia) John Peers	(Australia) Kimberly Birrell (Australia) John-Patrick Smith	3–6, 6–4, [10–6]
2026	(Australia) Olivia Gadecki (Australia) John Peers	(France) Kristina Mladenovic (France) Manuel Guinard	4–6, 6–3, [10–8]

== See also ==
Australian Open other competitions

- List of Australian Open men's singles champions
- List of Australian Open men's doubles champions
- List of Australian Open women's singles champions
- List of Australian Open women's doubles champions

Grand Slam mixed doubles

- List of French Open mixed doubles champions
- List of Wimbledon mixed doubles champions
- List of US Open mixed doubles champions
- List of Grand Slam mixed doubles champions
