= 1928 Australian Championships – Women's doubles =

Women's doubles
- 1928 Australian Championships

Final
- Champions: (Australia) Daphne Akhurst (Australia) Esna Boyd
- Runners-up: (Australia) Kathleen Le Messurier (Australia) Dorothy Weston
- Score: 6–3, 6–1

Details
- Draw: 14
- Seeds: 4

Events
Singles	men	women		boys	girls
Doubles	men	women	mixed	boys	girls
- Australian Championships

The first seeds Daphne Akhurst and Esna Boyd defeated the fourth seeds Kathleen Le Messurier and Dorothy Weston 6–3, 6–1 in the final, to win the women's doubles tennis title at the 1928 Australian Championships.

== Seeds ==
1. (Australia) Daphne Akhurst / (Australia) Esna Boyd (champions)
2. (Australia) Louie Bickerton / (Australia) Meryl O'Hara Wood (semifinals)
3. (Australia) Marjorie Cox / (Australia) Sylvia Harper (semifinals)
4. (Australia) Kathleen Le Messurier / (Australia) Dorothy Weston (final)

== Draw ==
Key

- Q = Qualifier
- WC = Wild card
- LL = Lucky loser
- Alt = Alternate
- ITF = ITF entry
- PR = Protected ranking
- SR = Special ranking
- SE = Special exempt
- JE = Junior exempt
- JR = Junior Accelerator Programme entrant
- CO = College Accelerator Programme entrant
- NG = Next Gen Accelerator Program entrant
- w/o = Walkover
- r = Retired
- d = Defaulted

=== Draw ===
First round
(Australia) Coral Buttsworth ^{[a]} (Australia) Mall Molesworth	6	6
(Australia) Nell Lloyd (Australia) Lorna Utz	4	2
(Australia) Dorothy Dingle (Australia) Gwen Waterhouse	6	6
(Australia) Mrs. E. Dyer (Australia) Mrs. O. Waddington	1	3
3	(Australia) Marjorie Cox (Australia) Sylvia Harper	6	8
(Australia) Birdie Bond (Australia) Iris Luckie	0	6
2	(Australia) Louie Bickerton (Australia) Meryl O'Hara Wood	w/o
(Australia) Millie Membrey (Australia) Grace Paterson
(Australia) Mrs. Bolton (Australia) Edith Freudenstein	w/o
(Australia) Kath Hayes ^{[a]} (Australia) Mrs. F. Harper
(Australia) Floris Conway (Australia) Pattie Meaney	6	6
(Australia) Eileen Rischbieth (Australia) Mrs. W. T. Rowe ^{[b]}	0	0

Quarterfinals
1	(Australia) Daphne Akhurst (Australia) Esna Boyd	6	6
(Australia) Coral Buttsworth (Australia) Mall Molesworth	1	2
(Australia) Dorothy Dingle (Australia) Gwen Waterhouse	1	2
3	(Australia) Marjorie Cox (Australia) Sylvia Harper	6	6
2	(Australia) Louie Bickerton (Australia) Meryl O'Hara Wood	6	6
(Australia) Mrs. Bolton (Australia) Edith Freudenstein	2	0
(Australia) Floris Conway (Australia) Pattie Meaney	6	6
4	(Australia) Kathleen Le Messurier (Australia) Dorothy Weston	8	8

Semifinals
1	(Australia) Daphne Akhurst (Australia) Esna Boyd	6	2	6
3	(Australia) Marjorie Cox (Australia) Sylvia Harper	4	6	3
2	(Australia) Louie Bickerton (Australia) Meryl O'Hara Wood	4	6	2
4	(Australia) Kathleen Le Messurier (Australia) Dorothy Weston	6	0	6

Final
1	(Australia) Daphne Akhurst (Australia) Esna Boyd	6	6
4	(Australia) Kathleen Le Messurier (Australia) Dorothy Weston	3	1

== Notes ==
- ^{a} These ladies switched pairs in relation to an original draw.
- ^{b} Most likely Flora Rowe, mother of Ernest Rowe.
