= 1928 Australian Championships – Mixed doubles =

Mixed doubles
- 1928 Australian Championships

Final
- Champions: (Australia) Daphne Akhurst (France) Jean Borotra
- Runners-up: (Australia) Esna Boyd (Australia) Jack Hawkes
- Score: w/o

Details
- Draw: 20
- Seeds: 4

Events
Singles	men	women		boys	girls
Doubles	men	women	mixed	boys	girls
- Australian Championships

Second-seeded Daphne Akhurst and Jean Borotra won the final on a walkover against the first seeds Esna Boyd and Jack Hawkes, to win the mixed doubles tennis title at the 1928 Australian Championships.

Originally this final (as well as men's singles and men's doubles finals) was scheduled to be played on Saturday, February 4. As the tournament progressed, it turned out that Borotra would have been engaged in all three of them. He refused to play three matches in one day and wished to forfeit in mixed doubles event. This was not agreed to by the committee and his semi-final and subsequent final mixed doubles matches were postponed until Monday, February 6. Unfortunately, Miss Boyd, who had been in Sydney for a fortnight (as the women's events have begun on 21 January), could not arrange to remain longer and had to scratch.

Both Miss Akhurst and Jean Borotra completed a Triple Crown achievement, having already won their singles and doubles titles.

== Seeds ==
1. (Australia) Esna Boyd / (Australia) Jack Hawkes (final)
2. (Australia) Daphne Akhurst / (France) Jean Borotra (champions)
3. (Australia) Sylvia Harper / (France) Jacques Brugnon (semifinals)
4. (Australia) Louie Bickerton / (France) Christian Boussus (semifinals)

== Draw ==
Key

- Q = Qualifier
- WC = Wild card
- LL = Lucky loser
- Alt = Alternate
- ITF = ITF entry
- PR = Protected ranking
- SR = Special ranking
- SE = Special exempt
- JE = Junior exempt
- JR = Junior Accelerator Programme entrant
- CO = College Accelerator Programme entrant
- NG = Next Gen Accelerator Program entrant
- w/o = Walkover
- r = Retired
- d = Defaulted

=== Finals ===
Quarterfinals
2	(Australia) Daphne Akhurst (France) Jean Borotra	6	6
(Australia) Joan Wheaton (Australia) Dick Medcalf	1	1
(Australia) Kathleen Le Messurier (Australia) Norman Peach	4	4
3	(Australia) Sylvia Harper (France) Jacques Brugnon	6	6
1	(Australia) Esna Boyd (Australia) Jack Hawkes	7	4	6
(Australia) Pattie Meaney (Australia) Fred Kalms	5	6	3
(Australia) Mrs. F. Harper (Australia) Elliott M. Dunn	3	2
4	(Australia) Louie Bickerton (France) Christian Boussus	6	6

Semifinals
2	(Australia) Daphne Akhurst (France) Jean Borotra	6	3	6
3	(Australia) Sylvia Harper (France) Jacques Brugnon	0	6	3
1	(Australia) Esna Boyd (Australia) Jack Hawkes	6	8
4	(Australia) Louie Bickerton (France) Christian Boussus	1	6

Final
2	(Australia) Daphne Akhurst (France) Jean Borotra	w/o
1	(Australia) Esna Boyd (Australia) Jack Hawkes

=== Earlier rounds ===
==== Section 1 ====
First round
(Australia) Birdie Bond (Australia) V. E. Page	6	6
(Australia) Grace Paterson (Australia) James Bayley	4	2
3	(Australia) Sylvia Harper (France) Jacques Brugnon	4	7	6
(Australia) Floris Conway (Australia) Rupert Wertheim	6	5	2

Second round
2	(Australia) Daphne Akhurst (France) Jean Borotra	6	6
(Australia) Kath Hayes (Australia) Cecil Ward	2	0
(Australia) Joan Wheaton (Australia) Dick Medcalf	2	6	6
(Australia) Lorna Utz (Australia) Darby Louden	6	2	4
(Australia) Kathleen Le Messurier (Australia) Norman Peach	1	6	6
(Australia) Marjorie Cox (Australia) Gar Moon	6	3	4
(Australia) Birdie Bond (Australia) V. E. Page	2	4
3	(Australia) Sylvia Harper (France) Jacques Brugnon	6	6

Quarterfinals
2	(Australia) Daphne Akhurst (France) Jean Borotra	6	6
(Australia) Joan Wheaton (Australia) Dick Medcalf	1	1
(Australia) Kathleen Le Messurier (Australia) Norman Peach	4	4
3	(Australia) Sylvia Harper (France) Jacques Brugnon	6	6

Semifinals
2	(Australia) Daphne Akhurst (France) Jean Borotra	6	3	6
3	(Australia) Sylvia Harper (France) Jacques Brugnon	0	6	3

==== Section 2 ====
First round
1	(Australia) Esna Boyd (Australia) Jack Hawkes	6	6
(Australia) Gwen Waterhouse (Australia) Guy Williams	2	4
(Australia) Dorothy Bickerton (Australia) Jim Willard	11	7	6
(Australia) Dorothy Dingle (Australia) Len Thurlow	13	5	3

Second round
1	(Australia) Esna Boyd (Australia) Jack Hawkes	6	6
(Australia) Dorothy Bickerton (Australia) Jim Willard	0	0
(Australia) Pattie Meaney (Australia) Fred Kalms	6	6
(Australia) Mall Molesworth (Australia) Jack Cummings	2	4
(Australia) Mrs. F. Harper (Australia) Elliott M. Dunn	6	6
(Australia) Mrs. W. T. Rowe ^{[a]} (Australia) Ron Ford	1	0
4	(Australia) Louie Bickerton (France) Christian Boussus	6	8
(Australia) Dorothy Weston (Australia) Frank Peach	3	6

Quarterfinals
1	(Australia) Esna Boyd (Australia) Jack Hawkes	7	4	6
(Australia) Pattie Meaney (Australia) Fred Kalms	5	6	3
(Australia) Mrs. F. Harper (Australia) Elliott M. Dunn	3	2
4	(Australia) Louie Bickerton (France) Christian Boussus	6	6

Semifinals
1	(Australia) Esna Boyd (Australia) Jack Hawkes	6	8
4	(Australia) Louie Bickerton (France) Christian Boussus	1	6

== Notes ==
- ^{a} Most likely Flora Rowe, mother of Ernest Rowe.
