= 1932 Australian Championships – Men's doubles =

Men's doubles
- 1932 Australian Championships

Final
- Champions: (Australia) Jack Crawford (Australia) Gar Moon
- Runners-up: (Australia) Harry Hopman (Australia) Gerald Patterson
- Score: 4–6, 6–4, 12–10, 6–3

Details
- Draw: 16
- Seeds: 4

Events
Singles	men	women		boys	girls
Doubles	men	women	mixed	boys	girls
- Australian Championships

The third seeds Jack Crawford and Gar Moon defeated fourth-seeded Harry Hopman and Gerald Patterson 4–6, 6–4, 12–10, 6–3 in the final, to win the men's doubles tennis title at the 1932 Australian Championships.

With the final shot of the match he put away, Crawford completed his Triple Crown, having won Men's Singles and Mixed Doubles titles earlier that day.

== Seeds ==
1. (Australia) Charles Donohoe / (Australia) Ray Dunlop (semifinals)
2. (Japan) Ryosuke Nunoi / (Japan) Jiro Sato (quarterfinals)
3. (Australia) Jack Crawford / (Australia) Gar Moon (champions)
4. (Australia) Harry Hopman / (Australia) Gerald Patterson (final)

== Draw ==
Key

- Q = Qualifier
- WC = Wild card
- LL = Lucky loser
- Alt = Alternate
- ITF = ITF entry
- PR = Protected ranking
- SR = Special ranking
- SE = Special exempt
- JE = Junior exempt
- JR = Junior Accelerator Programme entrant
- CO = College Accelerator Programme entrant
- NG = Next Gen Accelerator Program entrant
- w/o = Walkover
- r = Retired
- d = Defaulted

=== Draw ===
First round
2	(Japan) Ryosuke Nunoi (Japan) Jiro Sato	6	6	6
(Australia) Cliff Harvey (Australia) Dick McMichael	1	1	3
(Australia) Jack Cummings (Australia) Clifford Sproule	3	6	6	6
(Australia) Harold Doctor (Australia) Les Hancock	6	0	0	1
4	(Australia) Harry Hopman (Australia) Gerald Patterson	6	6	10	6
(Australia) Joe Rodgers (Australia) Aubrey Willard	1	4	12	3
(Australia) Jack Hawkes (Australia) Gar Hone	0	6	8	6
(Australia) Robert Barbour (Australia) Len Schwartz	6	1	6	4
1	(Australia) Charles Donohoe (Australia) Ray Dunlop	6	6	8
(Australia) Ron Hone (Australia) Allan Knight	2	2	6
(Japan) Takeichi Harada (Australia) Jim Willard	6	2	6	4	6
(Australia) Dave Chrystal (Australia) Reg Ewin	3	6	2	6	3
3	(Australia) Jack Crawford (Australia) Gar Moon	6	11	6
(Australia) Ernest Rowe (Australia) Rupert Shepherd	1	9	1
(Australia) Adrian Quist (Australia) Don Turnbull	6	11	6
(Australia) Jack Purcell (Australia) Bert Tonkin	4	9	3

Quarterfinals
2	(Japan) Ryosuke Nunoi (Japan) Jiro Sato	2	2	4
(Australia) Jack Cummings (Australia) Clifford Sproule	6	6	6
4	(Australia) Harry Hopman (Australia) Gerald Patterson	6	6	6
(Australia) Jack Hawkes (Australia) Gar Hone	2	2	3
1	(Australia) Charles Donohoe (Australia) Ray Dunlop	4	6	7	8
(Japan) Takeichi Harada (Australia) Jim Willard	6	3	5	6
3	(Australia) Jack Crawford (Australia) Gar Moon	w/o
(Australia) Adrian Quist (Australia) Don Turnbull (Note: Turnbull withdrew due to illness.)

Semifinals
(Australia) Jack Cummings (Australia) Clifford Sproule	5	2	4
4	(Australia) Harry Hopman (Australia) Gerald Patterson	7	6	6
1	(Australia) Charles Donohoe (Australia) Ray Dunlop	4	3	5
3	(Australia) Jack Crawford (Australia) Gar Moon	6	6	7

Final
4	(Australia) Harry Hopman (Australia) Gerald Patterson	6	4	10	3
3	(Australia) Jack Crawford (Australia) Gar Moon	4	6	12	6
