= 1932 Australian Championships – Women's doubles =

Women's doubles
- 1932 Australian Championships

Final
- Champions: (Australia) Coral Buttsworth (Australia) Marjorie Crawford
- Runners-up: (Australia) Kathleen Le Messurier (Australia) Dorothy Weston
- Score: 6–2, 6–2

Details
- Draw: 11
- Seeds: 4

Events
Singles	men	women		boys	girls
Doubles	men	women	mixed	boys	girls
- Australian Championships

Second-seeded Coral Buttsworth and Marjorie Crawford defeated the fourth seeds Kathleen Le Messurier and Dorothy Weston 6–2, 6–2 in the final, to win the women's doubles tennis title at the 1932 Australian Championships.

Earlier that day both Mrs. Buttsworth and Mrs. Crawford had already won one title each – Women's singles and Mixed Doubles, respectively.

== Seeds ==
1. n/a (Note: Originally first-seeded pair were Meryl O'Hara Wood and Esna Boyd Robertson but the latter withdrew from the tournament because of serious illness and – ultimately – death of her mother on the eve of the event.)
2. (Australia) Coral Buttsworth / (Australia) Marjorie Crawford (champions)
3. (Australia) Frances Hoddle-Wrigley / (Australia) Emily Hood Westacott (semifinals)
4. (Australia) Kathleen Le Messurier / (Australia) Dorothy Weston (final)

== Draw ==
Key

- Q = Qualifier
- WC = Wild card
- LL = Lucky loser
- Alt = Alternate
- ITF = ITF entry
- PR = Protected ranking
- SR = Special ranking
- SE = Special exempt
- JE = Junior exempt
- JR = Junior Accelerator Programme entrant
- CO = College Accelerator Programme entrant
- NG = Next Gen Accelerator Program entrant
- w/o = Walkover
- r = Retired
- d = Defaulted

=== Draw ===
First round
(Australia) Edna Lawrence (Australia) Mollie McGrath	7	2	6
(Australia) Dorothy Anderson (Australia) Gwen Stevenson	5	6	2
4	(Australia) Kathleen Le Messurier (Australia) Dorothy Weston	6	6
(Australia) Florence Francisco (Australia) Joyce Williams	4	0
3	(Australia) Frances Hoddle-Wrigley (Australia) Emily Hood Westacott	6	6
(Australia) Joyce Lillecrapp (Australia) Roma Wadey	3	2

Quarterfinals
(Australia) Nancy Lewis (Australia) Meryl O'Hara Wood	6	6
(Australia) Betty Ward (Australia) Jean Wilson	2	4
(Australia) Edna Lawrence (Australia) Mollie McGrath	4	3
4	(Australia) Kathleen Le Messurier (Australia) Dorothy Weston	6	6
3	(Australia) Frances Hoddle-Wrigley (Australia) Emily Hood Westacott	6	6
(Australia) Christabel Finlayson (Australia) Gwen Griffiths	2	2
2	(Australia) Coral Buttsworth (Australia) Marjorie Crawford	4	6	6
(Australia) Edna Collison (Australia) Truda Cox	6	3	2

Semifinals
(Australia) Nancy Lewis (Australia) Meryl O'Hara Wood	2	10	3
4	(Australia) Kathleen Le Messurier (Australia) Dorothy Weston	6	8	6
3	(Australia) Frances Hoddle-Wrigley (Australia) Emily Hood Westacott	4	3
2	(Australia) Coral Buttsworth (Australia) Marjorie Crawford	6	6

Final
4	(Australia) Kathleen Le Messurier (Australia) Dorothy Weston	2	2
2	(Australia) Coral Buttsworth (Australia) Marjorie Crawford	6	6
