= 1928 Australian Championships – Men's doubles =

Men's doubles
- 1928 Australian Championships

Final
- Champions: (France) Jean Borotra (France) Jacques Brugnon
- Runners-up: (Australia) Gar Moon (Australia) Jim Willard
- Score: 6–2, 4–6, 6–4, 6–4

Details
- Draw: 20
- Seeds: 4

Events
Singles	men	women		boys	girls
Doubles	men	women	mixed	boys	girls
← 1927 ·	Australian Championships	· 1929 →

The second-seeds Jean Borotra and Jacques Brugnon defeated the unseeded Gar Moon and Jim Willard 6–2, 4–6, 6–4, 6–4 in the final, to win the men's doubles tennis title at the 1928 Australian Championships.

== Seeds ==
1. (Australia) Jack Hawkes / (Australia) Gerald Patterson (semifinals)
2. (France) Jean Borotra / (France) Jacques Brugnon (champions)
3. (Australia) Jack Crawford / (Australia) Harry Hopman (quarterfinals)
4. (France) Christian Boussus / (Australia) Fred Kalms (second round)

== Draw ==
=== Key ===
- Q = Qualifier
- WC = Wild card
- LL = Lucky loser
- Alt = Alternate
- ITF = ITF entry
- PR = Protected ranking
- SR = Special ranking
- SE = Special exempt
- JE = Junior exempt
- JR = Junior Accelerator Programme entrant
- CO = College Accelerator Programme entrant
- NG = Next Gen Accelerator Program entrant
- w/o = Walkover
- r = Retired
- d = Defaulted

=== Finals ===
Quarterfinals
1	(Australia) Jack Hawkes (Australia) Gerald Patterson	6	6	6
(Australia) Ray Dunlop (Australia) Guy Williams	2	0	3
(Australia) Dick North (Australia) Norman Peach	3	3	8	7
(Australia) Gar Moon (Australia) Jim Willard	6	6	6	9
2	(France) Jean Borotra (France) Jacques Brugnon	8	6	7
(Australia) Les Baker (Australia) Jack Cummings	6	3	5
(Australia) Bob Schlesinger (Australia) Rupert Wertheim	6	6	4	6	7
3	(Australia) Jack Crawford (Australia) Harry Hopman	8	1	6	1	5

Semifinals
1	(Australia) Jack Hawkes (Australia) Gerald Patterson	5	5	4
(Australia) Gar Moon (Australia) Jim Willard	7	7	6
2	(France) Jean Borotra (France) Jacques Brugnon	6	3	5	6	6
(Australia) Bob Schlesinger (Australia) Rupert Wertheim	4	6	7	1	1

Final
(Australia) Gar Moon (Australia) Jim Willard	2	6	4	4
2	(France) Jean Borotra (France) Jacques Brugnon	6	4	6	6

=== Earlier rounds ===
==== Section 1 ====
First round
(Australia) Gar Moon (Australia) Jim Willard	6	6	6
(Australia) E. M. Dunn (Australia) Cecil Ward	4	2	2
4	(France) Christian Boussus (Australia) Fred Kalms	6	6	6
(Australia) Cliff S. Colvin (Australia) Clifford Sproule	1	3	4

Second round
1	(Australia) Jack Hawkes (Australia) Gerald Patterson	6	6	6
(Australia) Dick Medcalf (Australia) Frank Peach	1	2	2
(Australia) Ray Dunlop (Australia) Guy Williams	4	6	6	6
(Australia) James Bayley (Australia) A. N. Kerr	6	2	1	1
(Australia) Dick North (Australia) Norman Peach	6	6	6
(Australia) Norman McDougall (Australia) Len Thurlow	1	1	3
(Australia) Gar Moon (Australia) Jim Willard	6	7	8	3	9
4	(France) Christian Boussus (Australia) Fred Kalms	4	5	10	6	7

Quarterfinals
1	(Australia) Jack Hawkes (Australia) Gerald Patterson	6	6	6
(Australia) Ray Dunlop (Australia) Guy Williams	2	0	3
(Australia) Dick North (Australia) Norman Peach	3	3	8	7
(Australia) Gar Moon (Australia) Jim Willard	6	6	6	9

Semifinals
1	(Australia) Jack Hawkes (Australia) Gerald Patterson	5	5	4
(Australia) Gar Moon (Australia) Jim Willard	7	7	6

==== Section 2 ====
First round
2	(France) Jean Borotra (France) Jacques Brugnon	8	6	6
(Australia) Herb Coram (Australia) Vin Munns	6	0	3
(Australia) Jim Fitzgerald (Australia) Possum Munro	6	6	7
(Australia) Arthur Cattanach (Australia) Dudley Frankenberg	0	1	5

Second round
2	(France) Jean Borotra (France) Jacques Brugnon	6	6	6
(Australia) Jim Fitzgerald (Australia) Possum Munro	4	2	3
(Australia) Les Baker (Australia) Jack Cummings	6	6	6
(Australia) Ron Ford (Australia) Bill Halliday	2	3	2
(Australia) Bob Schlesinger (Australia) Rupert Wertheim	6	6	6
(Australia) Bruce Dive (Australia) Jack McCausland	4	1	3
3	(Australia) Jack Crawford (Australia) Harry Hopman	6	6	6
(Australia) Arthur Down (Australia) H. W. Smith	0	2	1

Quarterfinals
2	(France) Jean Borotra (France) Jacques Brugnon	8	6	7
(Australia) Les Baker (Australia) Jack Cummings	6	3	5
(Australia) Bob Schlesinger (Australia) Rupert Wertheim	6	6	4	6	7
3	(Australia) Jack Crawford (Australia) Harry Hopman	8	1	6	1	5

Semifinals
2	(France) Jean Borotra (France) Jacques Brugnon	6	3	5	6	6
(Australia) Bob Schlesinger (Australia) Rupert Wertheim	4	6	7	1	1
