= 1932 Australian Championships – Men's singles =

Men's singles
- 1932 Australian Championships

Final
- Champion: (Australia) Jack Crawford
- Runner-up: (Australia) Harry Hopman
- Score: 4–6, 6–3, 3–6, 6–3, 6–1

Details
- Draw: 32 (9Q) (Note: 41 players have entered for the event in which number of entries was limited to 32. 23 were placed in the main draw and 18 had to play in the preliminary round. Nine winners qualified into the first round of the competition proper.)
- Seeds: 8

Events
Singles	men	women		boys	girls
Doubles	men	women	mixed	boys	girls
- Australian Championships

Jack Crawford defeated Harry Hopman 4–6, 6–3, 3–6, 6–3, 6–1 in the final to win the men's singles tennis title at the 1932 Australian Championships.

== Seeds ==
1. (Australia) Jack Crawford (champion)
2. (Japan) Jiro Sato (semifinals)
3. (Japan) Takeichi Harada (first round)
4. (Australia) Harry Hopman (finalist)
5. (Japan) Ryosuke Nunoi (quarterfinals)
6. (Australia) Ray Dunlop (second round)
7. (Australia) Jack Cummings (second round)
8. (Australia) Don Turnbull (second round)

== Draw ==
Key

- Q = Qualifier
- WC = Wild card
- LL = Lucky loser
- Alt = Alternate
- ITF = ITF entry
- PR = Protected ranking
- SR = Special ranking
- SE = Special exempt
- JE = Junior exempt
- JR = Junior Accelerator Programme entrant
- CO = College Accelerator Programme entrant
- NG = Next Gen Accelerator Program entrant
- w/o = Walkover
- r = Retired
- d = Defaulted

=== Finals ===
Quarterfinals
2	(Japan) Jiro Sato	6	6	6
(Australia) Vivian McGrath	3	2	2
4	(Australia) Harry Hopman	12	6	8
(Australia) Aubrey Willard	10	3	6
1	(Australia) Jack Crawford	3	7	6	6
5	(Japan) Ryosuke Nunoi	6	5	4	1
(Australia) James Willard	4	2	6
(Australia) Clifford Sproule	6	6	8

Semifinals
2	(Japan) Jiro Sato	6	2	3	6	4
4	(Australia) Harry Hopman	0	6	6	4	6
1	(Australia) Jack Crawford	6	2	6	6
(Australia) Clifford Sproule	4	6	2	1

Final
4	(Australia) Harry Hopman	6	3	6	3	1
1	(Australia) Jack Crawford	4	6	3	6	6

=== Earlier rounds ===
==== Section 1 ====
First round
2	(Japan) Sato	6	6	6
Q	(Australia) Ewin	2	2	2
(Australia) Donohoe	6	3	6	6
(Australia) Hawkes	0	6	3	1
6	(Australia) Dunlop	7	2	6	6
(Australia) Tonkin	5	6	4	3
(Australia) McGrath	6	6	1	9
(Australia) Moon	2	4	6	7
4	(Australia) Hopman	6	6	6
Q	(Australia) Manthorpe	2	2	4
(Australia) Quist	6	6	6
Q	(Australia) Hooper	1	0	1
7	(Australia) Cummings	3	7	9	6
(Australia) Shepherd	6	5	7	2
(Australia) A. Willard	5	4	6	6	6
Q	(Australia) Purcell	7	6	2	3	4

Second round
2	(Japan) Sato	6	6	6
(Australia) Donohoe	3	1	3
6	(Australia) Dunlop	3	6	2
(Australia) McGrath	6	8	6
4	(Australia) Hopman	7	6	6
(Australia) Quist	5	4	0
7	(Australia) Cummings	4	1	3
(Australia) A. Willard	6	6	6

Quarterfinals
2	(Japan) Sato	6	6	6
(Australia) McGrath	3	2	2
4	(Australia) Hopman	12	6	8
(Australia) A. Willard	10	3	6

Semifinals
2	(Japan) Sato	6	2	3	6	4
4	(Australia) Hopman	0	6	6	4	6

==== Section 2 ====
First round
1	(Australia) Crawford	4	7	6	6	6
Q	(Australia) Knight	6	5	8	4	3
(Australia) Hone	w/o
(Australia) Patterson
5	(Japan) Nunoi	6	6	6
Q	(Australia) Thompson	1	1	1
(Australia) Rowe	w/o
(Australia) Hassett
Q	(Australia) Rodgers	w/o
3	(Japan) Harada
(Australia) J. Willard	3	6	10	6
Q	(Australia) Schwartz	6	2	8	3
8	(Australia) Turnbull	6	8	6
(Australia) Moore	0	6	1
(Australia) Sproule	6	6	6
Q	(Australia) Chrystal	1	2	4

Second round
1	(Australia) Crawford	6	6	11
(Australia) Hone	3	4	9
5	(Japan) Nunoi	6	6	6
(Australia) Rowe	2	0	2
Q	(Australia) Rodgers	4	3	1
(Australia) J. Willard	6	6	6
8	(Australia) Turnbull	5	6	0	1
(Australia) Sproule	7	2	6	6

Quarterfinals
1	(Australia) Crawford	3	7	6	6
5	(Japan) Nunoi	6	5	4	1
(Australia) J. Willard	4	2	6
(Australia) Sproule	6	6	8

Semifinals
1	(Australia) Crawford	6	2	6	6
(Australia) Sproule	4	6	2	1

== Notes ==
Preceded by 1931 U.S. National Championships	Grand Slam men's singles	Succeeded by 1932 French Championships
