= 1928 Australian Championships – Women's singles =

Women's singles
- 1928 Australian Championships

Final
- Champion: (Australia) Daphne Akhurst
- Runner-up: (Australia) Esna Boyd
- Score: 7–5, 6–2

Details
- Draw: 19
- Seeds: 4

Events
Singles	men	women		boys	girls
Doubles	men	women	mixed	boys	girls
- Australian Championships

Daphne Akhurst defeated Esna Boyd 7–5, 6–2, in the final to win the women's singles tennis title at the 1928 Australian Championships.

== Seeds ==
The seeded players are listed below. Daphne Akhurst is the champion; others show the round in which they were eliminated.

1. (Australia) Esna Boyd (finalist)
2. (Australia) Daphne Akhurst (champion)
3. (Australia) Louie Bickerton (semifinals)
4. (Australia) Sylvia Harper (second round)

== Draw ==
=== Key ===
- Q = Qualifier
- WC = Wild card
- LL = Lucky loser
- r = Retired

=== Finals ===
Quarterfinals
2	(Australia) Daphne Akhurst	6	6
(Australia) Dorothy Weston	1	2
(Australia) Meryl O'Hara Wood	1	6	6
(Australia) Kathleen Le Messurier	6	4	2
1	(Australia) Esna Boyd	7	6
(Australia) Mall Molesworth	5	2
(Australia) Pattie Meaney	6	1	1
3	(Australia) Louie Bickerton	4	6	6

Semifinals
2	(Australia) Daphne Akhurst	6	7
(Australia) Meryl O'Hara Wood	2	5
1	(Australia) Esna Boyd	6	6
3	(Australia) Louis Bickerton	2	3

Finals
2	(Australia) Daphne Akhurst	7	6
1	(Australia) Esna Boyd	5	2

=== Earlier rounds ===
==== Section 1 ====
First round
(Australia) Kathleen Le Messurier	6	6
(Australia) Edith Freudenstein ^{[a]}	0	0
4	(Australia) Sylvia Harper	6	6
(Australia) Floris Conway	4	1

Second round
2	(Australia) Daphne Akhurst	6	6
(Australia) Nell Lloyd	1	2
(Australia) Dorothy Weston ^{[a]}	6	6
(Australia) Gwen Waterhouse	3	4
(Australia) Meryl O'Hara Wood	6	6
(Australia) Coral Buttsworth	1	2
(Australia) Le Messurier	1	6	6
4	(Australia) Harper	6	3	3

Quarterfinals
2	(Australia) Akhurst	6	6
(Australia) Weston	1	2
(Australia) O'Hara Wood	1	6	6
(Australia) Le Messurier	6	4	2

Semifinals
2	(Australia) Akhurst	6	7
(Australia) O'Hara Wood	2	5

==== Section 2 ====
First round
(Australia) Iris Luckie	10	9	6
(Australia) Grace Paterson	8	11	3

Second round
1	(Australia) Esna Boyd	7	6
(Australia) Marjorie Cox	5	2
(Australia) Mall Molesworth	^{[b]}
(Australia) Luckie	^{[b]}
(Australia) Pattie Meaney	6	6
(Australia) Dorothy Dingle	1	2
3	(Australia) Louie Bickerton	6	6
(Australia) Birdie Bond	3	2

Quarterfinals
1	(Australia) Boyd	7	6
(Australia) Molesworth	5	2
(Australia) Meaney	6	1	1
3	(Australia) Bickerton	4	6	6

Semifinals
1	(Australia) Boyd	6	6
3	(Australia) Bickerton	2	3

== See also ==
- 1928 Australian Championships – Men's singles

== Notes ==
- ^{a} In an original draw Le Messurier and Weston – both representatives of South Australia – have been drawn together in the first round (Freudenstein received a bye into the second round to play against Waterhouse). This was protested by the South Australian Council as being against the regulations.
- ^{b} This is most confusing one. No source gives an information about such a draw, let alone the result.

Preceded by 1927 U.S. National Championships – Women's singles	Grand Slam women's singles	Succeeded by 1928 French Championships – Women's singles
