= 1928 Australian Championships – Men's singles =

Men's singles
- 1928 Australian Championships

Final
- Champion: (France) Jean Borotra
- Runner-up: (Australia) Jack Cummings
- Score: 6–4, 6–1, 4–6, 5–7, 6–3

Details
- Draw: 40
- Seeds: 8

Events
Singles	men	women		boys	girls
Doubles	men	women	mixed	boys	girls
- Australian Championships

Jean Borotra defeated Jack Cummings 6–4, 6–1, 4–6, 5–7, 6–3 in the final to win the men's singles tennis title at the 1928 Australian Championships.

== Seeds ==
The seeded players are listed below. Jean Borotra is the champion; others show the round in which they were eliminated.

1. (France) Jean Borotra (champion)
2. (Australia) Gerald Patterson (quarterfinals)
3. (France) Jacques Brugnon (third round)
4. (Australia) Jack Crawford (semifinals)
5. (France) Christian Boussus (third round)
6. (Australia) Harry Hopman (quarterfinals)
7. (Australia) Jack Hawkes (quarterfinals)
8. (Australia) Gar Moon (third round)

== Draw ==
=== Key ===
- Q = Qualifier
- WC = Wild card
- LL = Lucky loser
- r = Retired

=== Finals ===
Quarterfinals
1	(France) Jean Borotra	6	6	6
6	(Australia) Harry Hopman	4	4	3
4	(Australia) Jack Crawford	6	8	6
7	(Australia) Jack Hawkes	2	6	3
(Australia) Jack Cummings	4	2	6	8	6
(Australia) Frederick Kalms	6	6	3	6	1
(Australia) Bob Schlesinger	6	7	6
2	(Australia) Gerald Patterson	4	9	4

Semifinals
1	(France) Jean Borotra	4	6	1	7	6
4	(Australia) Jack Crawford	6	3	6	5	4
(Australia) Jack Cummings	6	2	6	8
(Australia) Bob Schlesinger	1	6	4	6

Finals
1	(France) Jean Borotra	6	6	4	5	6
(Australia) Jack Cummings	4	1	6	7	3

=== Earlier rounds ===
==== Section 1 ====
First round
1	(France) Borotra	6	6	6
(Australia) Fitzgerald	2	3	0
(Australia) Sproule	6	6	6
(Australia) Brewster	2	4	3
(Australia) Medcalf	6	6	6
(Australia) Williams	2	3	2
(Australia) Baker	5	4	6	7	6
(Australia) Munns	7	6	2	5	0

Second round
1	(France) Borotra	6	6	6
(Australia) Sproule	2	0	3
(Australia) Medcalf	7	8	4	3
(Australia) Baker	5	10	6	6
6	(Australia) Hopman	5	6	4	6	6
(Australia) Page	7	1	6	2	3
(Australia) Wertheim	6	6	6
(Australia) Hicks	0	1	3

Third round
1	(France) Borotra	1	4	6	6	6
(Australia) Baker	6	6	1	2	1
6	(Australia) Hopman	6	3	6	4	6
(Australia) Wertheim	3	6	2	6	4

Quarterfinals
1	(France) Borotra	6	6	6
6	(Australia) Hopman	4	4	3

==== Section 2 ====
First round

Second round
4	(Australia) Crawford	6	6	6	3	6
(Australia) Cattanach	3	8	4	6	2
(Australia) Bayley	7	6	6
(Australia) Smith	5	0	1
7	(Australia) Hawkes	6	6	6
(Australia) Southwick	0	1	1
(Australia) Dunlop	6	3	6	4	7
(Australia) McCausland	3	6	3	6	5

Third round
4	(Australia) Crawford	6	6	7
(Australia) Bayley	4	2	5
7	(Australia) Hawkes	6	6	6
(Australia) Dunlop	1	1	2

Quarterfinals
4	(Australia) Crawford	6	8	6
7	(Australia) Hawkes	2	6	3

==== Section 3 ====
First round
(Australia) Colvin	6	5	6	6
(Australia) Thurlow	2	7	1	3
(Australia) Kalms	8	6	6
(Australia) Hatherley	6	0	1
(Australia) A. Willard	6	6	4	6
(Australia) Dunn	4	3	6	1
8	(Australia) Moon	6	6	6
(Australia) Frankenberg	3	1	1

Second round
(Australia) Cummings	6	6	6
(Australia) Ward	0	0	1
3	(France) Brugnon	6	6	6
(Australia) Coram	2	2	4
(Australia) Colvin	4	0	2
(Australia) Kalms	6	6	6
(Australia) A. Willard	2	3	1
8	(Australia) Moon	6	6	6

Third round
(Australia) Cummings	6	1	6	9
3	(France) Brugnon	2	6	2	7
(Australia) Kalms	10	4	6	6
8	(Australia) Moon	8	6	3	2

Quarterfinals
(Australia) Cummings	4	2	6	8	6
(Australia) Kalms	6	6	3	6	1

==== Section 4 ====
First round

Second round
5	(France) Boussus	6	6	6
(Australia) Ford	1	3	4
(Australia) Schlesinger	6	6	6
(Australia) J. Willard	0	4	0
(Australia) Peach	6	2	3	7	6
(Australia) Walker	2	6	6	5	1
(Australia) Down	2	1	1
2	(Australia) Patterson	6	6	6

Third round
5	(France) Boussus	2	6	6	0	3
(Australia) Schlesinger	6	2	2	6	6
(Australia) Peach	8	3	6	3
2	(Australia) Patterson	10	6	3	6

Quarterfinals
(Australia) Schlesinger	6	7	6	rtd.
2	(Australia) Patterson	4	9	4

== See also ==
- 1928 Australian Championships – Women's singles

Preceded by 1927 U.S. National Championships	Grand Slam men's singles	Succeeded by 1928 French Championships
