= 1928 Australian Championships =

- Date: 21 January – 30 January 1928
- Edition: 21st
- Category: Grand Slam (ITF)
- Surface: Grass
- Location: Sydney, Australia
- Venue: White City Tennis Club

Champions

Men's singles
- (France) Jean Borotra

Women's singles
- (Australia) Daphne Akhurst

Men's doubles
- (France) Jean Borotra / (France) Jacques Brugnon

Women's doubles
- (Australia) Daphne Akhurst / (Australia) Esna Boyd

Mixed doubles
- (Australia) Daphne Akhurst / (France) Jean Borotra

Boys' singles
- (Australia) Jack Crawford

Boys' doubles
- (Australia) Jack Crawford / (Australia) Colin Whiteman
- Australian Championships

The 1928 Australian Championships was a tennis tournament that took place on outdoor Grass courts at the White City Tennis Club, Sydney, Australia from 21 January to 6 February. (Note: Matches in women's and junior events were played between 21st and 30th of January, while men's matches and mixed doubles started on 28th.) It was the 21st edition of the Australian Championships (now known as the Australian Open), the 5th held in Sydney, and the first Grand Slam tournament of the year. The singles titles were won by Frenchman Jean Borotra and Australian Daphne Akhurst.

Nineteen-year-old Australian, Jack Crawford reached the semi-finals, where he was beaten by Borotra.

This was the first of only four such a Grand Slam tournaments, in which a History was achieved by two players.

== Finals ==
=== Men's singles ===
(France) Jean Borotra defeated (Australia) Jack Cummings 6–4, 6–1, 4–6, 5–7, 6–3

=== Women's singles ===
(Australia) Daphne Akhurst defeated (Australia) Esna Boyd 7–5, 6–2

=== Men's doubles ===
(France) Jean Borotra / (France) Jacques Brugnon defeated (Australia) Gar Moon / (Australia) Jim Willard 6–2, 4–6, 6–4, 6–4

=== Women's doubles ===
(Australia) Daphne Akhurst / (Australia) Esna Boyd defeated (Australia) Kathleen Le Messurier / (Australia) Dorothy Weston 6–3, 6–1

=== Mixed doubles ===
(Australia) Daphne Akhurst / (France) Jean Borotra defeated (Australia) Esna Boyd / (Australia) Jack Hawkes walkover

== Notes ==
Preceded by 1927 U.S. National Championships	Grand Slams	Succeeded by 1928 French Championships
