= Lorna Utz =

Australian tennis player (born 1904)

Lorna Mabel Utz (née Bull; 1904 – ????) was an Australian tennis player

== Tennis career ==
Lorna Utz reached the quarterfinals of Wimbledon championship in women's double in 1925 partnered with Esna Boyd and they lost to Suzanne Lenglen and Elizabeth Ryan 0–6, 2–6. Harold Utz and Lorna Utz also competed in mixed doubles in 1925 Wimbledon Championships but lost in the first round to Royden Dash and Phoebe Watson.

== Grand slam finals ==
Lorna Utz reached the final in the inaugural Australian Championship in mixed doubles with Harold Utz and lost to Esna Boyd Robertson and Jack Hawkes 6–1, 6–1. She also reached the Australian Championship women's doubles final in 1931 with Nell Lloyd and they lost Louie Bickerton and Daphne Akhurst 6–0, 6–4.

== Horse racing career ==
After retiring from tennis, Utz owned and raced racehorses under the name "Miss Lorna Doone".

== See also ==
- List of Australian Open mixed doubles champions
