= 1924 Australasian Championships =

- Date: 19–30 January 1924
- Edition: 17th
- Category: Grand Slam (ITF)
- Surface: Grass
- Location: Melbourne, Australia
- Venue: Warehouseman's Cricket Ground

Champions

Men's singles
- (Australia) James Anderson

Women's singles
- (Australia) Sylvia Lance

Men's doubles
- (Australia) James Anderson / (Australia) Norman Brookes

Women's doubles
- (Australia) Daphne Akhurst / (Australia) Sylvia Lance

Mixed doubles
- (Australia) Daphne Akhurst / (Australia) Jim Willard

Boys' singles
- (Australia) Alan Coldham

Boys' doubles
- (Australia) Alec Berckelman / (Australia) Ray Dunlop
- Australasian Championships

The 1924 Australasian Championships was a tennis tournament that took place on outdoor Grass courts at the Warehouseman's Cricket Ground in Melbourne, Australia, from 19 January to 30 January. It was the 17th edition of the Australasian Championships (now known as the Australian Open), the 4th held in Melbourne, and the first Grand Slam tournament of the year. The singles titles were won by Australians James Anderson and Sylvia Lance.

== Finals ==
=== Men's singles ===
(Australia) James Anderson defeated (Australia) Bob Schlesinger 6–3, 6–4, 3–6, 5–7, 6–3

=== Women's singles ===
(Australia) Sylvia Lance defeated (Australia) Esna Boyd 6–3, 3–6, 8–6

=== Men's doubles ===
(Australia) James Anderson / (Australia) Norman Brookes defeated (Australia) Pat O'Hara Wood / (Australia) Gerald Patterson 6–2, 6–4, 6–3

=== Women's doubles ===
(Australia) Daphne Akhurst / (Australia) Sylvia Lance defeated (Australia) Kathleen Le Messurier / (Australia) Meryl O'Hara Wood 7–5, 6–2

=== Mixed doubles ===
(Australia) Daphne Akhurst / (Australia) Jim Willard defeated (Australia) Esna Boyd / (Australia) Gar Hone 6–3, 6–4

Preceded by 1923 U.S. National Championships	Grand Slams	Succeeded by 1924 Wimbledon Championships
