= 1932 Australian Championships – Women's singles =

Women's singles
- 1932 Australian Championships

Final
- Champion: (Australia) Coral Buttsworth
- Runner-up: (Australia) Kathleen Le Messurier
- Score: 9–7, 6–4

Details
- Draw: 17
- Seeds: 4

Events
Singles	men	women		boys	girls
Doubles	men	women	mixed	boys	girls
- Australian Championships

Coral Buttsworth defeated Kathleen Le Messurier 9–7, 6–4, in the final to win the women's singles tennis title at the 1932 Australian Championships.

== Seeds ==
1. n/a (Note: Originally the first seed was Esna Boyd Robertson but she withdrew from the tournament because of serious illness and – ultimately – death of her mother on the eve of the event.)
2. (Australia) Marjorie Crawford (quarterfinals)
3. (Australia) Coral Buttsworth (champion)
4. (Australia) Frances Hoddle-Wrigley (quarterfinals)

== Draw ==
=== Key ===
- Q = Qualifier
- WC = Wild card
- LL = Lucky loser
- r = Retired

=== Finals ===
Quarterfinals
(Australia) Jean Wilson	1	0
(Australia) Dorothy Weston	6	6
3	(Australia) Coral Buttsworth	6	6
(Australia) Meryl O'Hara Wood	1	3
2	(Australia) Marjorie Crawford	2	4
(Australia) Kathleen Le Messurier	6	6
4	(Australia) Frances Hoddle-Wrigley	4	5
(Australia) Emily Hood Westacott	6	7

Semifinals
(Australia) Dorothy Weston	1	1
3	(Australia) Coral Buttsworth	6	6
(Australia) Kathleen Le Messurier	10	7
(Australia) Emily Hood Westacott	8	5

Finals
3	(Australia) Coral Buttsworth	9	6
(Australia) Kathleen Le Messurier	7	4

=== Earlier rounds ===
==== Section 1 ====
First round
(Australia) Edna Lawrence	6	6
(Australia) Roma Wadey	2	2

Second round
(Australia) Jean Wilson	w/o
1	(Australia) Esna Boyd Robertson
(Australia) Dorothy Weston	4	6	6
(Australia) Mollie McGrath	6	4	2
3	(Australia) Coral Buttsworth	6	6
(Australia) Gwen Griffiths	3	1
(Australia) Meryl O'Hara Wood	6	6
(Australia) Edna Lawrence	2	2

Quarterfinals
(Australia) Jean Wilson	1	0
(Australia) Dorothy Weston	6	6
3	(Australia) Coral Buttsworth	6	6
(Australia) Meryl O'Hara Wood	1	3

Semifinals
(Australia) Dorothy Weston	1	1
3	(Australia) Coral Buttsworth	6	6

==== Section 2 ====
First round

Second round
2	(Australia) Marjorie Crawford	6	6
(Australia) Gwen Stevenson	1	2
(Australia) Kathleen Le Messurier	6	6
(Australia) Dorothy Anderson	3	0
4	(Australia) Frances Hoddle-Wrigley	6	6
(Australia) Edna Collison	2	2
(Australia) Emily Hood Westacott	4	6	6
(Australia) Betty Ward	6	3	1

Quarterfinals
2	(Australia) Marjorie Crawford	2	4
(Australia) Kathleen Le Messurier	6	6
4	(Australia) Frances Hoddle-Wrigley	4	5
(Australia) Emily Hood Westacott	6	7

Semifinals
(Australia) Kathleen Le Messurier	10	7
(Australia) Emily Hood Westacott	8	5

== See also ==
- 1932 Australian Championships – Men's singles

== Notes ==
Preceded by 1931 U.S. National Championships – Women's singles	Grand Slam women's singles	Succeeded by 1932 French Championships – Women's singles
