= 1932 Australian Championships =

- Date: 6–13 February 1932
- Edition: 25th
- Category: Grand Slam (ITF)
- Surface: Grass
- Location: Adelaide, Australia
- Venue: Memorial Drive

Champions

Men's singles
- (Australia) Jack Crawford

Women's singles
- (Australia) Coral McInnes Buttsworth

Men's doubles
- (Australia) Jack Crawford / (Australia) Gar Moon

Women's doubles
- (Australia) Coral McInnes Buttsworth / (Australia) Marjorie Cox Crawford

Mixed doubles
- (Australia) Marjorie Cox Crawford / (Australia) Jack Crawford

Boys' singles
- (Australia) Vivian McGrath

Girls' singles
- (Australia) Nancy Lewis

Boys' doubles
- (Australia) Adrian Quist / (Australia) Len Schwartz

Girls' doubles
- (Australia) Florence Francisco / (Australia) Joyce Williams
- Australian Championships

The 1932 Australian Championships was a tennis tournament that took place on outdoor Grass courts at the Memorial Drive, Adelaide, Australia from 6 February to 13 February. It was the 25th edition of the Australian Championships (now known as the Australian Open), the 5th held in Adelaide, and the first Grand Slam tournament of the year. The singles titles were won by Australians Jack Crawford and Coral McInnes Buttsworth.

== Finals ==
=== Men's singles ===
(Australia) Jack Crawford defeated (Australia) Harry Hopman 4–6, 6–3, 3–6, 6–3, 6–1

=== Women's singles ===
(Australia) Coral McInnes Buttsworth defeated (Australia) Kathleen Le Messurier 9–7, 6–4

=== Men's doubles ===
(Australia) Jack Crawford / (Australia) Gar Moon defeated (Australia) Harry Hopman / (Australia) Gerald Patterson 4–6, 6–4, 12–10, 6–3

=== Women's doubles ===
(Australia) Coral McInnes Buttsworth / (Australia) Marjorie Cox Crawford defeated (Australia) Kathleen Le Messurier / (Australia) Dorothy Weston 6–2, 6–2

=== Mixed doubles ===
(Australia) Marjorie Cox Crawford / (Australia) Jack Crawford defeated (Australia) Meryl O'Hara Wood / (Japan) Jiro Sato 6–8, 8–6, 6–3

Preceded by 1931 U.S. National Championships	Grand Slams	Succeeded by 1932 French Championships
