= Harold Utz =

Australian tennis player (1886–??)

Harold Utz was an Australian tennis player.

== Life ==
Harold Stewart Utz was born in 1886. He married Gwendoline M Chiplin in 1920.

== Tennis career ==
Harold Utz played some single tournaments and partnered Gwen Utz in mixed doubles. They reached the final of the inaugural Australian Championship in mixed doubles and lost to Esna Boyd Robertson and Jack Hawkes 6–1, 6–1. Harold Utz and Gwen Utz also competed in mixed doubles in 1925 Wimbledon Championships but lost in the first round. He was nicknamed Barney and was known as H. S. Utz in championships records

== See also ==
- List of Australian Open mixed doubles champions
