= Ryosuke Nunoi =

Japanese tennis player (1909–1945)

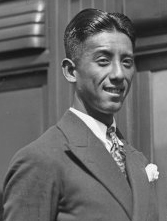
- Native name: 布井 良助
- Country (sports): Japan
- Born: 18 January 1909 Kobe, Japan
- Died: 21 July 1945 (aged 36) State of Burma

Grand Slam singles results
- Australian Open: QF (1932)
- French Open: 3R (1933)
- Wimbledon: 2R (1933)
- US Open: 4R (1933)

Grand Slam doubles results
- Wimbledon: F (1933)

Grand Slam mixed doubles results
- Wimbledon: 4R (1933)

Ryosuke Nunoi (布井 良助, Nunoi Ryōsuke; 18 January 1909 – 21 July 1945) was a tennis player from Japan.

== Early life ==
Nunoi, who came from an affluent Osaka merchant family, was a student at Kobe Higher Commercial School (now called Kobe University).

== Career ==
Nunoi was the youngest member of the Japanese squad that toured Australia in 1932 and played in a series of "Test matches" against the home side. In one of these matches he came close to upsetting Harry Hopman, but failed to convert set points in each of the two sets. He did however have a win over Jack Crawford in Perth. At the 1932 Australian Championships, Nunoi was a quarter-finalist in the singles, along with teammate Jiro Sato. Nunoi and Sato remained the only Japanese players to reach the quarter-finals at the Championships (later Australian Open) until they were joined by Kei Nishikori in 2012.

In 1933 he spent a lot of time in Europe, where he played in four Davis Cup ties, against Hungary, Ireland, Germany and Australia. He won singles matches over Emil Gábori, Béla von Kehrling, George Lyttleton-Rogers, Edward McGuire, Gustav Jaenecke and Vivian McGrath. His two singles losses were both in five sets, to Jack Crawford and Gottfried Von Cramm. Nunoi partnered Sato in all four doubles rubbers and they were beaten only once, by the Australian pairing of Jack Crawford and Adrian Quist, in another five set match.

While in Europe he appeared at both the 1933 French Championships and 1933 Wimbledon Championships. At the French Championships he was the 12th seed and came from two sets down to defeat Adrian Quist in the second round. He was then eliminated from the tournament by Marcel Bernard. In Wimbledon he lost in the second round to Lester Stoefen but made history with Jiro Sato in the doubles, with the pair becoming the first Japanese players to make a Wimbledon final. They lost in the tournament decider to Jean Borotra and Jacques Brugnon.

In August 1933 he partnered with compatriot Jiro Sato to win the doubles title at the German Championships in Hamburg.

He also competed in the 1933 U.S. National Championships, as the 10th seed. En route to the fourth round, where he was beaten by Frank Shields, Nunoi had wins over Americans Edward Jacobs, Samuel Gilpin and George Lott. To defeat Lott, Nunoi once again had to come from two sets down.

== Death ==
Nunoi served as a paymaster captain with the Imperial Japanese Army in World War II. He fought in the Burma campaign and took his own life on 21 July 1945.

== Grand Slam finals ==
=== Doubles (1 runner-up) ===
Result	Year	Championship	Surface	Partner	Opponents	Score
Loss	1933	Wimbledon	Grass	(Japan) Jiro Sato	(France) Jean Borotra (France) Jacques Brugnon	6–4, 3–6, 3–6, 5–7
