= Aubrey Willard =

Australian tennis player

- Full name: Sydney Aubrey Willard
- Country (sports): Australia
- Born: April 1894; Bathurst, New South Wales, Australia
- Died: 24 August 1961 (aged 67); New South Wales, Australia
- Turned pro: 1919 (amateur tour)
- Retired: 1934

Singles

Grand Slam singles results
- Australian Open: QF (1925, 1931, 1932)

Doubles

Grand Slam doubles results
- Australian Open: QF (1925)
- Wimbledon: 1R (1924)

Mixed doubles

Grand Slam mixed doubles results
- Australian Open: F (1931)
- Wimbledon: 2R (1924)

Aubrey Willard (1894–1961) was an Australian tennis player. He was the brother of Australian singles finalist James Willard. Aubrey Willard served as a driver in the DAC in World war 1. He made his debut at the Australasian championships in 1922 and lost in round three to Andrew Huthnance. At the Australasian championships in 1925, Willard lost in the quarter-finals to Gerald Patterson. In 1928 he lost in round two to Edgar Moon. In 1931 he lost in the Australian quarter finals to Harry Hopman. In 1932, Willard beat Jack Cummings. Willard's play at the net won him the match. Willard lost to Hopman in the quarter-finals. In 1934 Willard lost in round three to Adrian Quist and then turned professional, becoming a coach.

== Grand Slam finals ==
=== Mixed Doubles (1 runner-up) ===
Result	Year	Championship	Surface	Partner	Opponents	Score
Runner-up	1931	Australian Championships	Grass	(Australia) Emily Hood Westacott	(Australia) Marjorie Cox Crawford (Australia) Jack Crawford	5–7, 4–6
