= Sylvia Lance Harper =

Australian tennis player

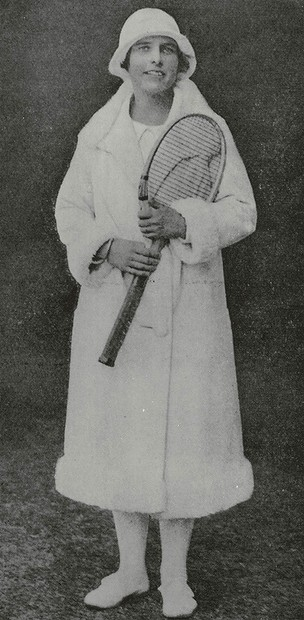
- Sylvia Lance in a warm-up coat in 1924
- Country (sports): Australia
- Born: 1 October 1895
- Died: 21 October 1982 (aged 87)

Singles
- Highest ranking: No. 10 (1924, A. Wallis Myers)

Grand Slam singles results
- Australian Open: W (1924)
- Wimbledon: 2R (1920)

Doubles

Grand Slam doubles results
- Australian Open: W (1923, 1924, 1925)
- Wimbledon: 3R (1925)

Grand Slam mixed doubles results
- Australian Open: W (1923)

Sylvia Harper (née Lance; 1 October 1895 – 21 October 1982) was an Australia tennis player who won the singles title at the 1924 Australian Championships. She reached the singles final there two other times, in 1927, losing to Esna Boyd, and in 1930, losing to Daphne Akhurst.

== Career ==
Harper won the women's doubles title at the Australian Championships three consecutive years. In 1923, her partner was Boyd, and in 1924 and 1925, her partner was Akhurst. She reached the final an additional three times with three different partners, in 1927, 1929, and 1930.

Harper won the mixed doubles title at the Australian Championships in 1923 with Horace Rice and was the runner-up in that event in 1925.

According to A. Wallis Myers of The Daily Telegraph and the Daily Mail, Harper was ranked World No. 10 in 1924, the only year she was included in those rankings.

Harper competed overseas on two occasions; in 1920 she competed at Wimbledon and, in 1925, captained the first women's tennis team to represent Australia internationally. At Wimbledon, she made the second round of the ladies singles, where she lost to Dorothy Shepherd, the ladies doubles, where she partnered Daphne Akhurst and the mixed doubles, where she partnered E. T. Lamb.

== Marriage ==
She married businessman Robert Rainy Harper on 28 May 1924 and they had one son.

== Grand Slam finals ==
=== Singles: 3 (1 title, 2 runners-up) ===
Result	Year	Championship	Surface	Opponent	Score	Ref.
Win	1924	Australasian Championships	Grass	(Australia) Esna Boyd	6–3, 3–6, 8–6	
Loss	1927	Australian Championships	Grass	(Australia) Esna Boyd	7–5, 1–6, 2–6	
Loss	1930	Australian Championships	Grass	(Australia) Daphne Akhurst	8–10, 6–2, 5–7	

=== Doubles: 6 (3 titles, 3 runners-up) ===
Result	Year	Championship	Surface	Partner	Opponents	Score	Ref.
Win	1923	Australasian Championships	Grass	(Australia) Esna Boyd	(Australia) Margaret Molesworth (Australia) Beryl Turner	6–1, 6–4	
Win	1924	Australasian Championships	Grass	(Australia) Daphne Akhurst	(Australia) Kathleen Le Messurier (Australia) Meryl O'Hara Wood	7–5, 6–2	
Win	1925	Australasian Championships	Grass	(Australia) Daphne Akhurst	(Australia) Esna Boyd (Australia) Kathleen Le Messurier	6–4, 6–3	
Loss	1927	Australian Championships	Grass	(Australia) Esna Boyd	(Australia) Louie Bickerton (Australia) Meryl O'Hara Wood	3–6, 3–6	
Loss	1929	Australian Championships	Grass	(Australia) Meryl O'Hara Wood	(Australia) Daphne Akhurst (Australia) Louie Bickerton	2–6, 6–3, 2–6	
Loss	1930	Australian Championships	Grass	(Australia) Marjorie Cox	(Australia) Margaret Molesworth (Australia) Emily Hood	3–6, 6–0, 5–7	

=== Mixed doubles: 2 (1 title, 1 runner-up) ===
Result	Year	Championship	Surface	Partner	Opponents	Score	Ref.
Win	1923	Australasian Championships	Grass	(Australia) Horace Rice	(Australia) Margaret Molesworth (Australia) Bert St. John	2–6, 6–4, 6–4	
Loss	1925	Australasian Championships	Grass	(Australia) Richard Schlesinger	(Australia) Daphne Akhurst (Australia) James Willard	4–6, 4–6	

== Grand Slam singles tournament timeline ==
Key
W	F	SF	QF	#R	RR	Q#	DNQ	A	NH

(W) winner; (F) finalist; (SF) semifinalist; (QF) quarterfinalist; (#R) rounds 4, 3, 2, 1; (RR) round-robin stage; (Q#) qualification round; (DNQ) did not qualify; (A) absent; (NH) not held; (SR) strike rate (events won / competed); (W–L) win–loss record.

Tournament	1920	1921	1922	1923	1924	1925	1926	1927	1928	1929	1930	1931	Career SR
Australian Championships	NH	NH	SF	SF	W	SF	SF	F	2R	SF	F	SF	1 / 10
French Championships^{1}	A	A	A	A	NH	A	A	A	A	A	A	A	0 / 0
Wimbledon	2R	A	A	A	A	3R	A	A	A	A	A	A	0 / 1
US Championships	A	A	A	A	A	A	A	A	A	A	A	A	0 / 0
SR	0 / 1	0 / 0	0 / 1	0 / 1	1 / 1	0 / 1	0 / 1	0 / 1	0 / 1	0 / 1	0 / 1	0 / 1	1 / 11

^{1}Through 1923, the French Championships were open only to French nationals. The World Hard Court Championships (WHCC), actually played on clay in Paris or Brussels, began in 1912 and were open to all nationalities. The results from that tournament are shown here for 1920 through 1923. The Olympics replaced the WHCC in 1924, as the Olympics were held in Paris. Beginning in 1925, the French Championships were open to all nationalities, with the results shown here beginning with that year.

== See also ==
- Performance timelines for all female tennis players since 1978 who reached at least one Grand Slam final
