= Jacques Brugnon =

French tennis player

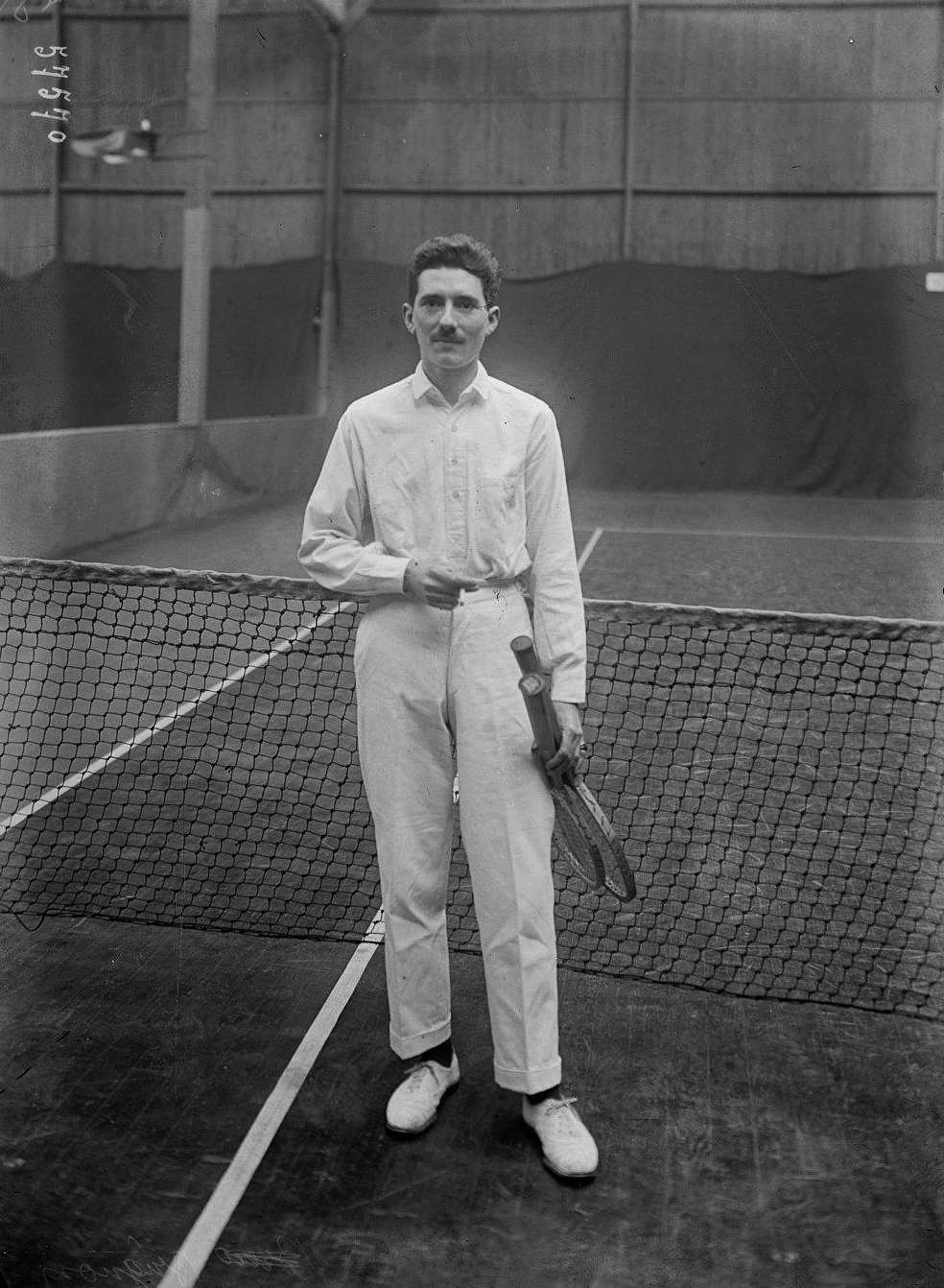
- Brugnon in 1920
- Full name: Jacques Marie Stanislas Jean Brugnon
- Country (sports): France
- Born: 11 May 1895 Paris, France
- Died: 20 March 1978 (aged 82) Monaco
- Plays: Right-handed (one-handed backhand)
- Int. Tennis HoF: 1976 (member page)

Singles
- Career record: 407–106 (68.6%)
- Career titles: 21
- Highest ranking: No. 9 (1927, A. Wallis Myers)

Grand Slam singles results
- Australian Open: 3R (1928)
- French Open: QF (1928, 1929)
- Wimbledon: SF (1926)
- US Open: QF (1926, 1927, 1928)

Doubles
- Career record: incomplete

Grand Slam doubles results
- Australian Open: W (1928)
- French Open: W (1927, 1928, 1930, 1932, 1934)
- Wimbledon: W (1926, 1928, 1932, 1933)
- US Open: SF (1928)

Grand Slam mixed doubles results
- Australian Open: SF (1928)
- French Open: W (1925, 1926)
- Wimbledon: SF (1932)
- US Open: SF (1927)

Team competitions
- Davis Cup: W (1927, 1928, 1930, 1931, 1932)
Medal record
Olympic Games – Tennis
Silver medal – second place	1924 Paris	Doubles

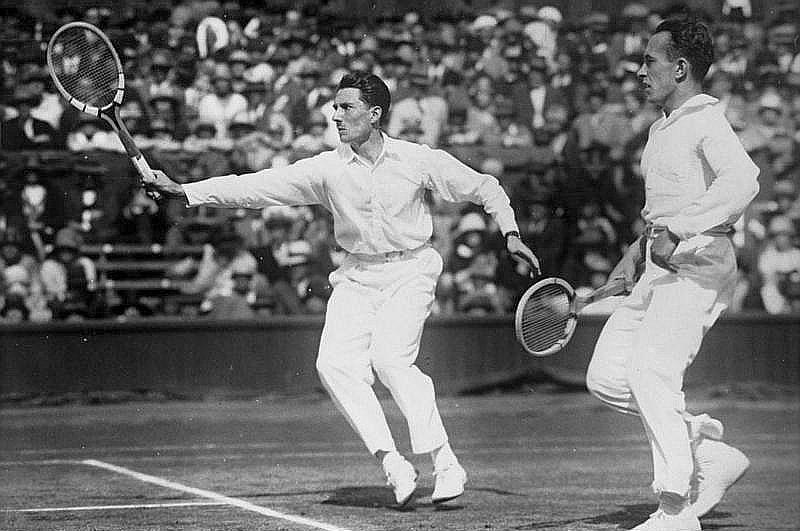
Jacques Brugnon at Wimbledon

Jacques Marie Stanislas Jean Brugnon (French pronunciation: [ʒak bʁyɲɔ̃]; 11 May 1895 – 20 March 1978), nicknamed "Toto", was a French tennis player, one of the famous "Four Musketeers" from France who dominated tennis in the late 1920s and early 1930s. He was born in and died in Paris.

He was primarily a doubles specialist who won 10 Grand Slam doubles titles in the French, American, Australian and British championships. Additionally he won two mixed doubles titles at Roland Garros partnering Suzanne Lenglen. He was also a fine singles player but never won a major title. He played in 20 Wimbledon Championships between 1920 and 1948 and achieved his best singles result in 1926 when he reached the semifinals, losing in a close five-set match to Howard Kinsey. He also competed at the 1920 Summer Olympics and the 1924 Summer Olympics.

Between 1921 and 1934, he played 31 times for the French Davis Cup team, mainly as a doubles player, compiling a record of 26 wins versus 11 losses. He was part of the famous Four Musketeers team that conquered the Cup in 1927 against the US, and a member of four of the five teams that defended it successfully through 1931.

Brugnon was ranked World No. 9 for 1927 by A. Wallis Myers of The Daily Telegraph.

The Four Musketeers were inducted simultaneously into the International Tennis Hall of Fame in Newport, Rhode Island, in 1976.

== Grand Slam finals ==
=== Doubles (10 titles, 7 runner-ups) ===
Result	Year	Championship	Surface	Partner	Opponents	Score
Loss	1925	French Championships	Clay	(France) Henri Cochet	(France) Jean Borotra (France) René Lacoste	5–7, 6–4, 3–6, 6–2, 3–6
Loss	1926	French Championships	Clay	(France) Henri Cochet	(United States) Vincent Richards (United States) Howard Kinsey	4–6, 1–6, 6–4, 4–6
Win	1926	Wimbledon	Grass	(France) Henri Cochet	(United States) Howard Kinsey (United States) Vincent Richards	7–5, 4–6, 6–3, 6–2
Win	1927	French Championships	Clay	(France) Henri Cochet	(France) Jean Borotra (France) René Lacoste	2–6, 6–2, 6–0, 1–6, 6–4
Loss	1927	Wimbledon	Grass	(France) Henri Cochet	(United States) Frank Hunter (United States) Bill Tilden	6–1, 6–4, 6–8, 3–6, 4–6
Win	1928	Australian Championships	Grass	(France) Jean Borotra	(Australia) Edgar Moon (Australia) Jim Willard	6–2, 4–6, 6–4, 6–4
Win	1928	French Championships	Clay	(France) Jean Borotra	(France) Henri Cochet (France) René de Buzelet	6–4, 3–6, 6–2, 3–6, 6–4
Win	1928	Wimbledon	Grass	(France) Henri Cochet	(Australia) John Hawkes (Australia) Gerald Patterson	13–11, 6–4, 6–4
Loss	1929	French Championships	Clay	(France) Henri Cochet	(France) René Lacoste (France) Jean Borotra	3–6, 6–3, 3–6, 6–3, 6–8
Win	1930	French Championships	Clay	(France) Henri Cochet	(Australia) Harry Hopman (Australia) Jim Willard	6–3, 9–7, 6–3
Loss	1931	Wimbledon	Grass	(France) Henri Cochet	(United States) George Lott (United States) John van Ryn	2–6, 8–10, 11–9, 6–3, 3–6
Win	1932	French Championships	Clay	(France) Henri Cochet	(France) Marcel Bernard (France) Christian Boussus	6–4, 3–6, 7–5, 6–3
Win	1932	Wimbledon	Grass	(France) Jean Borotra	(United Kingdom) Pat Hughes (United Kingdom) Fred Perry	6–0, 4–6, 3–6, 7–5, 7–5
Win	1933	Wimbledon	Grass	(France) Jean Borotra	(Japan) Ryosuki Nunoi (Japan) Jiro Satoh	4–6, 6–3, 6–3, 7–5
Win	1934	French Championships	Clay	(France) Jean Borotra	(Australia) Jack Crawford (Australia) Vivian McGrath	11–9, 6–3, 2–6, 4–6, 9–7
Loss	1934	Wimbledon	Grass	(France) Jean Borotra	(United States) George Lott (United States) Lester Stoefen	2–6, 3–6, 4–6
Loss	1939	French Championships	Clay	(France) Jean Borotra	(United States) Charles Harris (United States) Don McNeill	6–4, 4–6, 0–6, 6–2, 8–10

=== Mixed doubles (2 titles) ===
Result	Year	Championship	Surface	Partner	Opponents	Score
Win	1925	French Championships	Clay	(France) Suzanne Lenglen	(France) Didi Vlasto (France) Henri Cochet	6–2, 6–2
Win	1926	French Championships	Clay	(France) Suzanne Lenglen	(France) Nanette le Besnerais (France) Jean Borotra	6–4, 6–3
