= Jiro Sato =

Japanese tennis player (1908–1934)

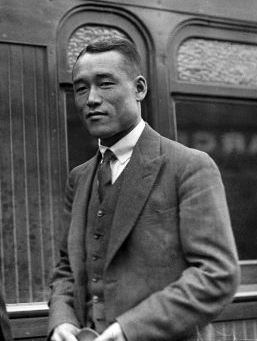
- Jiro Sato in 1932 at Central Station, Sydney
- Country (sports): Empire of Japan
- Born: January 5, 1908 Gunma Prefecture, Empire of Japan
- Died: April 5, 1934 (aged 26) Strait of Malacca
- Turned pro: 1929 (amateur tour)
- Retired: 1934 (death)
- Plays: Right-handed

Singles
- Career record: 128-26 (83.1%)
- Career titles: 18
- Highest ranking: No. 3 (1933, A. Wallis Myers)

Grand Slam singles results
- Australian Open: SF (1932)
- French Open: SF (1931, 1933)
- Wimbledon: SF (1932, 1933)
- US Open: 4R (1933)

Grand Slam doubles results
- Wimbledon: F (1933)

Grand Slam mixed doubles results
- Australian Open: F (1932)

Jiro Sato (佐藤 次郎, Satō Jirō; Japanese pronunciation: [sa.toː dʑi.ɾoː]; January 5, 1908 – April 5, 1934) was a Japanese tennis player. He was ranked world No. 3 in 1933 but died by suicide in the Strait of Malacca during his trip to the Davis Cup in 1934.

He received worldwide fame at Wimbledon in 1932, when he beat the defending champion Sidney Wood in the quarterfinal. In the semifinal, he lost to Bunny Austin. His peak came in 1933, when he beat Fred Perry in the French Open quarterfinal. He was ranked world No. 3 by A. Wallis Myers of The Daily Telegraph, behind Jack Crawford and Fred Perry. However, it got more and more difficult for him to endure the enormous pressure from Japan. It is believed that this pressure drove him to throw himself overboard into the Strait of Malacca on April 5, 1934, at 26 years of age.

== Tennis career ==
He debuted on the international tennis scene in 1929 when the touring Racing Club de Paris visited Japan for a series of exhibition matches. He notably defeated tennis legends Jacques Brugnon, Raymond Rodel and Pierre Henri Landry, only losing to Henri Cochet.

In 1930, he was the runner-up for the All Japan Championships, which he finally did win the next year. Also in 1930, he was a runner-up for the Mid-Pacific Invitational tournament, losing to American Cranston Holman and the doubles final as well.

In 1931, he lost the Miramar L. T. C. title in Juan-les-Pins against Hyotaro Sato, won the doubles, and was a finalist in mixed doubles. He clinched the South of England Championships in singles and doubles. He was defeated by Jean Borotra for the British Covered Court Championships title. He partnered with Hyotaro Sato to gain the Beau Site Club de Cannes second meeting trophy and the St. Raphaël T.C. title. In singles competition, he claimed the Country Club de Monte-Carlo second meeting title (the same tournament in which the Sato pair reached the doubles final). He became Dutch doubles champion alongside Minoru Kawachi. In July, he beat Vernon Kirby to win the Tunbridge Wells Championship. He captured the Midland Counties Championships in singles and mixed doubles that same month, only losing in the doubles final.

Between July and November 1931, he won 13 singles titles in Great Britain. He met Fred Perry twice for the Pacific Southwest Championships title in 1932 and 1933, losing both times. In August 1933, he partnered compatriot Ryosuke Nunoi to win the doubles title at the German Championships in Hamburg.

From 1931 to 1933, Sato played in ten ties for the Japanese Davis Cup team and won 22 rubbers and lost only six, compiling a 79% winning record.

=== Playing style ===
Sato played with a flat forehand drive, which he modeled after Henri Cochet when Cochet visited Japan in 1929. He hit the ball on the forehand side early after the bounce and was an excellent volleyer.

== Personal life ==
Jiro Sato attended Waseda University and studied economics. He abandoned his studies in 1933 to pursue tennis. He had an elder brother, Hyotaro Sato, who was also a tennis player. In 1934, he was engaged to Sanae Okada, one of Japan's best female tennis players.

=== Death ===
On April 4, 1934, Jiro Sato was on the ship N.Y.K. Hakone Maru crossing the Strait of Malacca en route to Europe for the 1934 International Lawn Tennis Challenge (later to be known as Davis Cup) against the Australia Davis Cup team in the second round. Ted Tinling was also on board. Earlier that day, Sato complained of stomach pains and thus had no appetite and remained in his cabin. He considered leaving the ship at Singapore, which he did for a medical examination. The exam revealed no reasons for his health problems, and it was concluded that his problems were psychological. Sato was nervous and feared that his illness would be an obstacle for his team to win. As the day passed, the Japan Davis Cup team was given a banquet hosted by the Japanese consul in Singapore. Sato was present and was further pushed by the consul and his teammates to proceed with the trip and sail to Europe. That same day a cable was received from the Japanese Lawn Tennis Association insisting on Sato's participation in the Davis Cup and that the voyage should be resumed without delay.

At 11:30 p.m. on April 5, 1934, before reaching Penang, Sato was found missing by his compatriot Jiro Yamagishi. The last time he was seen was at 8:30 p.m. when he had dinner in his cabin. He left two suicide notes, one to his Japanese tennis teammates expressing doubts that he would be able to help the team in the upcoming contest. He begged them to forgive him and do their best to prevail in the match. He promised he would be with his colleagues in spirit. The other note was addressed to the ship's captain, apologizing for the inconveniences that his actions might cause. A search for him continued for seven more hours and the vessel hovered in the strait. Wireless messages were sent to nearby ships. Later further evidence was found which confirmed the suicide theory. Two iron davit-winding handles and a training skip-rope were missing, which Sato probably used to tie weights on himself to make sure he would drown. After the discovery of the new evidence, the ship sent out a radio message stating that "Japan's finest tennis player and national hero was believed to have died by suicide by throwing himself overboard". On April 6, a prayer was ministered by his friends who assembled on the deck of the ship. An altar was built on board with photographs and racquets of Sato placed around it. Also a traditional Japanese "cake offering" ceremony was held. It was speculated that the pressure on him came from the growing prestige of the Empire of Japan and from the Japanese Lawn Tennis Association who refused to allow the exhausted Sato to have a break from tennis and skip the 1934 season. He became depressed and concerned about his abilities.

Several world class players reacted to the event. Fred Perry said that Sato was "one of the cheeriest men he had ever known". Bunny Austin added, "He had a great sense of humor...He always gave the impression that he would be the last man on earth to come to such an end". Ryuki Miki took over as captain of the Davis Cup team and went on to win the 1934 Wimbledon Championships mixed doubles title the same year. Miki stated Sato was a joyful person who loved jokes and making people laugh. His fiancée recalled that Sato hoped he could stay at Singapore. She further added: "I believe Jiro committed suicide solely from a sense of responsibility after he had acceded to the tennis association's urgings to proceed to Europe, even when he wanted to return from Singapore. To the end of my life I shall regret that it was the order of the Japanese Lawn Tennis Association that resulted in his death. Jiro was a man of honor and he played every time for the honor of Japan." His brother Hyotaro Sato addressed a call for the Japanese team to not cancel their match and to fight their hardest.

== Grand Slam finals ==
=== Doubles (1 runner-up ) ===
Result	Year	Championship	Surface	Partner	Opponents	Score
Loss	1933	Wimbledon	Grass	(Japan) Ryosuke Nunoi	(France) Jean Borotra (France) Jacques Brugnon	6–4, 3–6, 3–6, 5–7

=== Mixed doubles (1 runner-up) ===
Result	Year	Championship	Surface	Partner	Opponents	Score
Loss	1932	Australian Championships	Grass	(Australia) Meryl O'Hara Wood	(Australia) Marjorie Cox Crawford (Australia) Jack Crawford	8–6, 6–8, 3–6

== Grand Slam performance ==
Key
W	F	SF	QF	#R	RR	Q#	DNQ	A	NH

(W) winner; (F) finalist; (SF) semifinalist; (QF) quarterfinalist; (#R) rounds 4, 3, 2, 1; (RR) round-robin stage; (Q#) qualification round; (DNQ) did not qualify; (A) absent; (NH) not held; (SR) strike rate (events won / competed); (W–L) win–loss record.

=== Singles ===
Tournament	1931	1932	1933	Career
Australian Championships	-	SF	-	3–1
French Championships	SF	4R	SF	13–3
Wimbledon	QF	SF	SF	14–3
US Championships	-	2R	4R	2–2
Grand Slam W-L	9–2	11-4	12-3	32–9

== Sources ==
- Maurice Brady, The Encyclopedia of Lawn Tennis (Robert Hale Ltd., published in 1958 / See pages 118–119.)
- Bud Collins, Total Tennis, The Ultimate Tennis Encyclopedia (ISBN 0973144343, Sport Classic Books / See page 785.)
