= Clifford Sproule =

Australian tennis player and administrator

- Full name: Clifford Ewing Sproule
- Country (sports): Australia
- Born: 23 May 1905; Dubbo, New South Wales, Australia
- Died: 24 April 1981 (aged 75); New South Wales, Australia
- Turned pro: 1925 (amateur tour)
- Retired: 1938

Singles

Grand Slam singles results
- Australian Open: SF (1932)
- Wimbledon: 2R (1932, 1936, 1937)

Doubles

Grand Slam doubles results
- Australian Open: SF (1932)
- Wimbledon: QF (1936, 1937)

Mixed doubles

Grand Slam mixed doubles results
- Australian Open: 2R (1931)
- Wimbledon: 1R (1932)

Clifford Sproule (23 May 1905 – 24 April 1981) was an Australian tennis player and administrator. As a player he reached the semifinals of the Australian Championships singles. Sproule played Davis Cup, then was a manager of the Australian team and later still a referee. He was also President of the New South Wales Tennis Association. In 1976 he was awarded the OBE for services to tennis. Making his debut in the Australian men's singles, Sproule lost in the opening round in 1926 to Garton Hone. He lost in the second round in 1928 to Jean Borotra. He reached the quarter-finals in 1930 and 1931 (losing both to Jack Crawford). In 1932 Sproule beat Don Turnbull and James Willard before losing in the semi-finals to Crawford. At Wimbledon he lost in the second round on the three occasions he competed in the singles in 1932, 1936 and 1937.
