= Daphne Akhurst =

Australian tennis player (1903–1933)

Daphne Akhurst Cozens
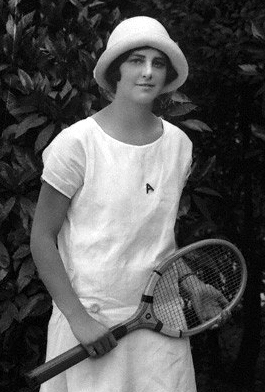
- Akhurst in 1925
- Full name: Daphne Jessie Akhurst Cozens
- Country (sports): Australia
- Born: 22 April 1903 Ashfield, New South Wales, Australia
- Died: 9 January 1933 (aged 29) Sydney, Australia
- Plays: Right-handed
- Int. Tennis HoF: 2013 (member page)

Singles
- Highest ranking: No. 3 (1928, A. Wallis Myers)

Grand Slam singles results
- Australian Open: W (1925, 1926, 1928, 1929, 1930)
- French Open: QF (1928)
- Wimbledon: SF (1928)

Grand Slam doubles results
- Australian Open: W (1924, 1925, 1928, 1929, 1931)
- French Open: QF (1928)
- Wimbledon: SF (1928)

Grand Slam mixed doubles results
- Australian Open: W (1924, 1925, 1928, 1929)
- French Open: QF (1928)
- Wimbledon: F (1928)

The Daphne Akhurst Memorial Cup

Daphne Jessie Akhurst (22 April 1903 – 9 January 1933), also known by her married name Daphne Cozens, was an Australian tennis player.

Akhurst won the women's singles title at the Australian Championships five times between 1925 and 1930. According to Wallis Myers (The Daily Telegraph, Daily Mail), she was ranked World No. 3 in 1928.

== Career ==
The second daughter of Oscar James Akhurst, a lithographer, and his wife Jessie Florence (née Smith), Daphne Akhurst won the women's singles title at the Australian Championships five times, in 1925, 1926, 1928, 1929, and 1930. She is fourth on the list of most women's singles titles at the Australian Championships; behind only Margaret Court with eleven titles, Serena Williams with seven and Nancye Wynne Bolton with six titles. She won the women's doubles title at the Australian Championships five times: in 1924 and 1925 with Sylvia Lance Harper, in 1928 with Esna Boyd Robertson, and in 1929 and 1931 with Louie Bickerton. She and Marjorie Cox were the runners-up in 1926.

In 1925 she was part of the first Australian women's team to tour Europe and reached the quarterfinal of the singles event at Wimbledon which she lost to Joan Fry. During her second and last European tour in 1928, she reached the singles quarterfinal at the French Championships, in which Christabel Hardie defeated her, and the semifinal at Wimbledon, which she lost in straight sets to Lili de Alvarez.

Akhurst won the mixed doubles title at the Australian Championships four times: in 1924 and 1925 with Jim Willard, in 1928 with Jean Borotra, and in 1929 with Gar Moon. She and Willard were the runners-up in 1926. She and her partner Jack Crawford reached the mixed doubles final at Wimbledon in 1928, but lost to the team of Elizabeth Ryan/Patrick Spence, 7–5, 6–4.

Akhurst won the singles title at the German Championships in 1928 after a three-sets victory in the final against defending champion Cilly Aussem.

== Personal life ==
Akhurst attended the Miss. E. Tildesley's Normanhurst School, followed by the Sydney Conservatorium of Music. On 26 February 1930 at St Philip's Church of England, Sydney, Daphne Akhurst married Royston Stuckey Cozens, a tobacco manufacturer, and retired from serious competition soon after winning the Australian ladies' doubles championship in 1931. They had one son, Don.

Daphne Akhurst Cozens died on 9 January 1933, aged 29, from an ectopic pregnancy.

== Legacy ==
Since 1934 the trophy presented each year to the winner of the women's singles at the Australian Open is named the Daphne Akhurst Memorial Cup in her honour. She was inducted into the Australian Tennis Hall of Fame on Australia Day (26 January), 2006. She was inducted into the International Tennis Hall of Fame in 2013.

== Grand Slam finals ==
=== Singles: 5 titles ===
Result	Year	Championship	Surface	Opponent	Score
Win	1925	Australasian Championships	Grass	(Australia) Esna Boyd	1–6, 8–6, 6–4
Win	1926	Australasian Championships	Grass	(Australia) Esna Boyd	6–1, 6–3
Win	1928	Australian Championships	Grass	(Australia) Esna Boyd	7–5, 6–2
Win	1929	Australian Championships	Grass	(Australia) Louie Bickerton	6–1, 5–7, 6–2
Win	1930	Australian Championships	Grass	(Australia) Sylvia Lance Harper	10–8, 2–6, 7–5

=== Doubles: 6 (5 titles, 1 runner-up) ===
Result	Year	Championship	Surface	Partner	Opponents	Score
Win	1924	Australasian Championships	Grass	(Australia) Sylvia Lance	(Australia) Kathleen Le Messurier (Australia) Meryl O'Hara Wood	7–5, 6–2
Win	1925	Australasian Championships	Grass	(Australia) Sylvia Lance Harper	(Australia) Esna Boyd (Australia) Kathleen Le Messurier	6–4, 6–3
Loss	1926	Australasian Championships	Grass	(Australia) Marjorie Cox	(Australia) Esna Boyd (Australia) Meryl O'Hara Wood	3–6, 8–6, 6–8
Win	1928	Australian Championships	Grass	(Australia) Esna Boyd	(Australia) Kathleen Le Messurier (United Kingdom) Dorothy Weston	6–3, 6–1
Win	1929	Australian Championships	Grass	(Australia) Louie Bickerton	(Australia) Sylvia Lance Harper (Australia) Meryl O'Hara Wood	6–2, 3–6, 6–2
Win	1931	Australian Championships	Grass	(Australia) Louie Bickerton	(Australia) Nell Lloyd (Australia) Lorna Utz	6–0, 6–4

=== Mixed Doubles: 6 (4 titles, 2 runners-up) ===
Result	Year	Championship	Surface	Partner	Opponents	Score
Win	1924	Australasian Championships	Grass	(Australia) James Willard	(Australia) Esna Boyd (Australia) Garton Hone	6–3, 6–4
Win	1925	Australasian Championships	Grass	(Australia) James Willard	(Australia) Sylvia Lance Harper (Australia) Richard Schlesinger	6–4, 6–4
Loss	1926	Australasian Championships	Grass	(Australia) James Willard	(Australia) Esna Boyd (Australia) John Hawkes	1–6, 4–6
Win	1928	Australian Championships	Grass	(France) Jean Borotra	(Australia) Esna Boyd (Australia) John Hawkes	walkover
Loss	1928	Wimbledon	Grass	(Australia) Jack Crawford	(United States) Elizabeth Ryan (South Africa) Patrick Spence	5–7, 4–6
Win	1929	Australian Championships	Grass	(Australia) Edgar Moon	(Australia) Marjorie Cox (Australia) Jack Crawford	6–0, 7–5

== Grand Slam singles tournament timeline ==
Key
W	F	SF	QF	#R	RR	Q#	DNQ	A	NH

(W) winner; (F) finalist; (SF) semifinalist; (QF) quarterfinalist; (#R) rounds 4, 3, 2, 1; (RR) round-robin stage; (Q#) qualification round; (DNQ) did not qualify; (A) absent; (NH) not held; (SR) strike rate (events won / competed); (W–L) win–loss record.

Tournament	1924	1925	1926	1927	1928	1929	1930	SR	W–L	Win %
Australian Championships	SF	W	W	2R	W	W	W	5 / 7	23–1	95.8
French Championships^{1}	NH	A	A	A	QF	A	A	0 / 1	2–1	66.7
Wimbledon	A	QF	A	A	SF	A	A	0 / 2	7–2	77.8
US Championships	A	A	A	A	A	A	A	0 / 0	–	–
Win–loss	2–1	7–1	4–0	1–0	10–2	4–0	4–0	5 / 10	32–4	88.9

^{1}The French Championships were not held in 1924, as the Olympics were held in Paris that year.

== See also ==
- Performance timelines for all female tennis players since 1978 who reached at least one Grand Slam final
