= Coral Buttsworth =

Australian tennis player

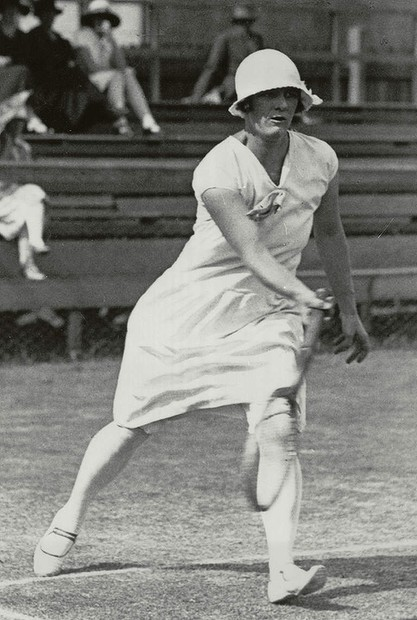
- Full name: Coral Annabell McInnes Buttsworth
- Country (sports): Australia
- Born: 7 June 1900 Jones Island, New South Wales, Australia
- Died: 20 December 1985 (aged 85) Hazelbrook, Australia

Singles

Grand Slam singles results
- Australian Open: W (1931, 1932)

Doubles

Grand Slam doubles results
- Australian Open: W (1932)

Coral Annabell Buttsworth (née McInnes; 7 June 1900 – 20 December 1985) was a female tennis player from Australia who won the singles title at the Australian Championships in 1931 and 1932 and the women's doubles title there in 1932. In 1933 she again made the final of the Australian Championships but was defeated in straight sets by first-seeded Joan Hartigan.

Buttsworth was the only multiple winner of the singles title at the Australian Championships who never won a state singles title. A strong, thick-set woman from Sydney, she was addicted to chopping the ball, with an excellent drop shot, and was quick around the court. She was a player who preferred to maneuver opponents out of position by running them up and back on the court rather than from side to side.

== Grand Slam finals ==
=== Singles (2 titles, 1 runner-up) ===
| Result | Year | Championship | Surface | Opponent | Score |
|---|---|---|---|---|---|
| Win | 1931 | Australian Championships | Grass | (Australia) Marjorie Cox Crawford | 1–6, 6–3, 6–4 |
| Win | 1932 | Australian Championships | Grass | (Australia) Kathleen Le Messurier | 6–4, 9–7 |
| Loss | 1933 | Australian Championships | Grass | (Australia) Joan Hartigan | 4–6, 3–6 |

=== Doubles (1 title) ===
| Result | Year | Championship | Surface | Partner | Opponents | Score |
|---|---|---|---|---|---|---|
| Win | 1932 | Australian Championships | Grass | (Australia) Marjorie Cox Crawford | (United Kingdom) Dorothy Weston (Australia) Kathleen Le Messurier | 6–2, 6–2 |

== Grand Slam singles tournament timeline ==
Key
| W | F | SF | QF | #R | RR | Q# | DNQ | A | NH |

(W) winner; (F) finalist; (SF) semifinalist; (QF) quarterfinalist; (#R) rounds 4, 3, 2, 1; (RR) round-robin stage; (Q#) qualification round; (DNQ) did not qualify; (A) absent; (NH) not held; (SR) strike rate (events won / competed); (W–L) win–loss record.

| Tournament | 1925 | 1926 | 1927 | 1928 | 1929 | 1930 | 1931 | 1932 | 1933 | Career SR |
|---|---|---|---|---|---|---|---|---|---|---|
| Australian Championships | 1R | A | A | 2R | A | A | W | W | F | 2 / 5 |
| French Championships | A | A | A | A | A | A | A | A | A | 0 / 0 |
| Wimbledon | A | A | A | A | A | A | A | A | A | 0 / 0 |
| U.S. Championships | A | A | A | A | A | A | A | A | A | 0 / 0 |
| SR | 0 / 1 | 0 / 0 | 0 / 0 | 0 / 1 | 0 / 0 | 0 / 0 | 1 / 1 | 1 / 1 | 0 / 1 | 2 / 5 |

== See also ==
- List of Australian Open women's singles champions
- Performance timelines for all female tennis players since 1978 who reached at least one Grand Slam final
