= Ray Dunlop =

Australian tennis player

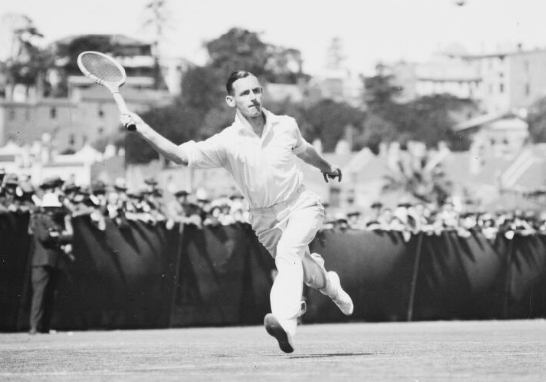
- Dunlop hitting a running forehand in 1932
- Full name: Charles Raymond Dunlop
- Country (sports): Australia
- Born: 1904 or 1905
- Died: 27 December 1974; Concord, Sydney, NSW, Australia

Singles

Grand Slam singles results
- Australian Open: 3R (1928)

Doubles

Grand Slam doubles results
- Australian Open: W (1931)

Grand Slam mixed doubles results
- Australian Open: F (1934)

Charles Raymond Dunlop (1904/1905 – 27 December 1974, and also spelled Roy Dunlop) was an Australian tennis player who won the 1931 Australian Championships in men's doubles. He was also a finalist in the 1934 Australian Championships in mixed doubles. He was a nephew of Alfred Dunlop, 1908 Australasian Championships doubles champion and singles runner-up.

== Grand Slam tournament finals ==
=== Doubles (1 title) ===
Result	Year	Championship	Surface	Partner	Opponents	Score
Win	1931	Australian Championships	Grass	(Australia) Charles Donohoe	(Australia) Jack Crawford (Australia) Harry Hopman	8–6, 6–2, 5–7, 7–9, 6–4

=== Mixed Doubles (1 final) ===
Result	Year	Championship	Surface	Partner	Opponents	Score
Loss	1934	Australian Championships	Grass	(Australia) Emily Westacott	(Australia) Joan Hartigan (Australia) Edgar Moon	3–6, 4–6
