= Marjorie Cox Crawford =

Australian tennis player

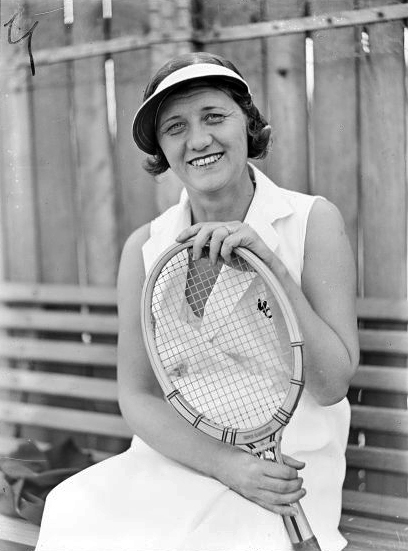
- Country (sports): Australia
- Born: 1903
- Died: 26 July 1983 (aged 79–80)

Singles

Grand Slam singles results
- Australian Open: F (1931)
- French Open: 2R (1933)
- Wimbledon: 1R (1932)

Doubles

Grand Slam doubles results
- Australian Open: W (1932)

Grand Slam mixed doubles results
- Australian Open: W (1931, 1932, 1933)

Marjorie Elizabeth Cox Crawford (1903–26 July 1983) was an Australian tennis player who reached at least the singles quarterfinals at the Australian Championships seven out of the nine times she played the event. Her best result was a runner-up finish in 1931, losing to Coral McInnes Buttsworth in three sets.

Crawford teamed with Buttsworth in 1932 to win the women's doubles title at the Australian Championships. Crawford was the runner-up in that event in 1926 (teaming with Daphne Akhurst Cozens) and 1930 (teaming with Sylvia Lance Harper). She also partnered with Jack Crawford, a six-time winner of singles titles in Grand Slam tournaments and a member of the International Tennis Hall of Fame, to win the mixed doubles title at the Australian Championships in 1931, 1932, and 1933. They were the runners-up in 1929 and 1930. The couple married in Sydney on 28 February 1930.

Crawford died on 26 July 1983, in Sydney.

== Grand Slam finals ==
=== Singles: 1 (1 runner-up) ===
Result	Year	Championship	Surface	Opponent	Score
Loss	1931	Australian Championships	Grass	(Australia) Coral Buttsworth	6–1, 3–6, 4–6

=== Doubles: 3 (1 titles, 2 runner-up) ===
Result	Year	Championship	Surface	Partner	Opponents	Score
Loss	1926	Australian Championships	Grass	(Australia) Daphne Akhurst	(Australia) Esna Boyd Robertson (Australia) Meryl O'Hara Wood	3–6, 8–6, 3–6
Loss	1930	Australian Championships	Grass	(Australia) Sylvia Lance Harper	(Australia) Emily Hood Westacott (Australia) Margaret Molesworth	3–6, 6–0, 5–7
Win	1932	Australian Championships	Grass	(Australia) Coral Buttsworth	(Australia) Kathleen Le Messurier (United Kingdom) Dorothy Weston	6–2, 6–2

=== Mixed doubles: 5 (3 titles, 2 runner-up) ===
Result	Year	Championship	Surface	Partner	Opponents	Score
Loss	1929	Australian Championships	Grass	(Australia) Jack Crawford	(Australia) Daphne Akhurst (Australia) Edgar Moon	6–0, 7–5
Loss	1930	Australian Championships	Grass	(Australia) Jack Crawford	(Australia) Nell Hall Hopman (Australia) Harry Hopman	9–11, 6–3, 3–6
Win	1931	Australian Championships	Grass	(Australia) Jack Crawford	(Australia) Emily Hood Westacott (Australia) Aubrey Willard	7–5, 6–4
Win	1932	Australian Championships	Grass	(Australia) Jack Crawford	(Australia) Nell Hall Hopman (Japan) Jiro Sato	6–8, 8–6, 6–3
Win	1933	Australian Championships	Grass	(Australia) Jack Crawford	(United States) Marjorie Gladman (United States) Ellsworth Vines	3–6, 7–5, 13–11

== Grand Slam singles tournament timeline ==
Key
W	F	SF	QF	#R	RR	Q#	DNQ	A	NH

(W) winner; (F) finalist; (SF) semifinalist; (QF) quarterfinalist; (#R) rounds 4, 3, 2, 1; (RR) round-robin stage; (Q#) qualification round; (DNQ) did not qualify; (A) absent; (NH) not held; (SR) strike rate (events won / competed); (W–L) win–loss record.

Tournament	1925	1926	1927	1928	1929	1930	1931	1932	1933	Career SR
Australian Championships	QF	SF	QF	2R	SF	QF	F	QF	2R	0 / 9
French Championships	A	A	A	A	A	A	A	A	2R	0 / 1
Wimbledon	A	A	A	A	A	A	A	1R	A	0 / 1
U.S. Championships	A	A	A	A	A	A	A	A	A	0 / 0
SR	0 / 1	0 / 1	0 / 1	0 / 1	0 / 1	0 / 1	0 / 1	0 / 2	0 / 2	0 / 11

== See also ==
- Performance timelines for all female tennis players since 1978 who reached at least one Grand Slam final
