= Dorothy Weston =

Australian tennis player

Dorothy Emily Louisa Weston
- Country (sports): Australia
- Residence: South Australia
- Born: 21 February 1900 South Australia
- Died: 17 March 1998 (aged 98) South Australia
- Plays: 1927-1938 (at least)

Doubles

Grand Slam doubles results
- Australian Open: F (1928, 1932)

Dorothy Weston (21 February 1900 – 17 March 1998) was an Australian tennis player from the inter-war period.

She was twice a double ladies finalist at the Australian Championships in 1928 and 1932, each time alongside Kathleen Le Messurier.

In 1934 she was the South Australia singles champion.

== Grand Slam finals ==
=== Doubles (2 runner-ups) ===
Result	Year	Championship	Surface	Partner	Opponents	Score
Loss	1928	Australian Championships	Grass	(Australia) Kathleen Le Messurier	(Australia) Daphne Akhurst Cozens (Australia) Esna Boyd Robertson	3–6, 1–6
Loss	1932	Australian Championships	Grass	(Australia) Kathleen Le Messurier	(Australia) Coral McInnes Buttsworth (Australia) Marjorie Cox Crawford	2–6, 2–6
