= Esna Boyd =

Australian tennis player (1899–1966)

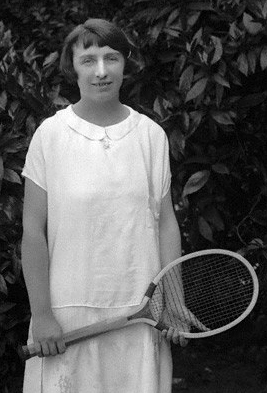
- Boyd in 1925
- Full name: Esna Boyd Robertson
- Country (sports): Australia
- Born: 21 September 1899 Melbourne, Colony of Victoria
- Died: 13 November 1966 (aged 67) Scotland

Singles
- Career titles: 37
- Highest ranking: No. 10 (1928, A. Wallis Myers)

Grand Slam singles results
- Australian Open: W (1927)
- French Open: 3R (1928)
- Wimbledon: QF (1925)

Grand Slam doubles results
- Australian Open: W (1922, 1923, 1926, 1928)

Grand Slam mixed doubles results
- Australian Open: W (1922, 1926, 1927)

Esna Boyd Robertson (née Boyd; 21 September 1899 – 13 November 1966) was an Australian tennis player who reached seven consecutive women's singles finals at the Australian Championships from 1922 through 1928. She won one of those finals, defeating Sylvia Lance Harper in 1927. Robertson participated in the first women's singles final at the Australian Championships in 1922 against fellow Australian Margaret Molesworth.

According to Wallis Myers of The Daily Telegraph and the Daily Mail, Robertson was ranked world No. 10 in 1928.

== Personal life ==
Boyd was born in Melbourne on 21 September 1899, the daughter of James Boyd, a politician, and Emma Flora McCormack. She had a sister, Alva who became a medical practitioner. She married Angus Robertson on 11 March 1929; they had a son, William, in 1930 and a daughter Mary, in 1933.

== Grand Slam finals ==
=== Singles: 7 (1 title, 6 runners-up) ===
Result	Year	Championship	Surface	Opponent	Score
Loss	1922	Australian Championships	Grass	(Australia) Margaret Molesworth	3–6, 8–10
Loss	1923	Australian Championships	Grass	(Australia) Margaret Molesworth	1–6, 5–7
Loss	1924	Australian Championships	Grass	(Australia) Sylvia Lance Harper	3–6, 6–3, 6–8
Loss	1925	Australian Championships	Grass	(Australia) Daphne Akhurst Cozens	6–1, 6–8, 4–6
Loss	1926	Australian Championships	Grass	(Australia) Daphne Akhurst Cozens	1–6, 3–6
Win	1927	Australian Championships	Grass	(Australia) Sylvia Lance Harper	5–7, 6–1, 6–2
Loss	1928	Australian Championships	Grass	(Australia) Daphne Akhurst Cozens	5–7, 2–6

=== Doubles: 6 (4 titles, 2 runners-up) ===
Result	Year	Championship	Surface	Partner	Opponents	Score
Win	1922	Australian Championships	Grass	(Australia) Marjorie Mountain	(Australia) Gwen Utz (Australia) Floris St. George	1–6, 6–4, 7–5
Win	1923	Australian Championships	Grass	(Australia) Sylvia Lance Harper	(Australia) Margaret Molesworth (Australia) Beryl Turner	6–1, 6–4
Loss	1925	Australian Championships	Grass	(Australia) Kathleen Le Messurier	(Australia) Daphne Akhurst (Australia) Sylvia Lance Harper	4–6, 3–6
Win	1926	Australian Championships	Grass	(Australia) Meryl O'Hara Wood	(Australia) Daphne Akhurst (Australia) Marjorie Cox Crawford	6–3, 6–8, 8–6
Loss	1927	Australian Championships	Grass	(Australia) Sylvia Lance Harper	(Australia) Louise Bickerton (Australia) Meryl O'Hara Wood	3–6, 3–6
Win	1928	Australian Championships	Grass	(Australia) Daphne Akhurst	(Australia) Kathleen Le Messurier (United Kingdom) Dorothy Weston	6–3, 6–1

=== Mixed doubles: 5 (3 titles, 2 runners-up) ===
Result	Year	Championship	Surface	Partner	Opponents	Score
Win	1922	Australian Championships	Grass	(Australia) John Hawkes	(Australia) Gwen Utz (Australia) Harold Utz	6–1, 6–1
Loss	1924	Australian Championships	Grass	(Australia) Gar Hone	(Australia) Daphne Akhurst (Australia) Jim Willard	3–6, 4–6
Win	1926	Australian Championships	Grass	(Australia) John Hawkes	(Australia) Daphne Akhurst (Australia) Jim Willard	6–1, 6–4
Win	1927	Australian Championships	Grass	(Australia) John Hawkes	(Australia) Youtha Anthony (Australia) Jim Willard	6–1, 6–3
Loss	1928	Australian Championships	Grass	(Australia) John Hawkes	(Australia) Daphne Akhurst (France) Jean Borotra	default

== Grand Slam singles tournament timeline ==
Key
W	F	SF	QF	#R	RR	Q#	DNQ	A	NH

(W) winner; (F) finalist; (SF) semifinalist; (QF) quarterfinalist; (#R) rounds 4, 3, 2, 1; (RR) round-robin stage; (Q#) qualification round; (DNQ) did not qualify; (A) absent; (NH) not held; (SR) strike rate (events won / competed); (W–L) win–loss record.

Tournament	1922	1923	1924	1925	1926	1927	1928	1929	1930	1931	1932	1933	1934	Career SR
Australian Championships	F	F	F	F	F	W	F	A	A	A	2R	A	A	1 / 8
French Championships^{1}	A	A	NH	A	A	A	3R	A	A	A	A	A	A	0 / 1
Wimbledon	A	A	A	QF	A	A	4R	A	4R	A	A	A	1R	0 / 4
United States Championships	A	A	A	A	A	A	A	A	A	A	A	A	A	0 / 0
SR	0 / 1	0 / 1	0 / 1	0 / 2	0 / 1	1 / 1	1 / 3	0 / 0	0 / 1	0 / 0	0 / 1	0 / 0	0 / 1	1 / 13

^{1}Through 1923, the French Championships were open only to French nationals. The World Hard Court Championships (WHCC), actually played on clay in Paris or Brussels, began in 1912 and were open to all nationalities. The results from the 1922 and 1923 editions of that tournament are shown here. The Olympics replaced the WHCC in 1924, as the Olympics were held in Paris. Beginning in 1925, the French Championships were open to all nationalities, with the results shown here beginning with that year.

== See also ==
- Performance timelines for all female tennis players since 1978 who reached at least one Grand Slam final
