= Kathleen Le Messurier =

Australian tennis player

- Country (sports): Australia
- Died: 1 January 1981 Adelaide, Australia

Singles

Grand Slam singles results
- Australian Open: F (1932)
- Wimbledon: 2R (1930)

Doubles

Grand Slam doubles results
- Australian Open: F (1924, 1925, 1928, 1932)

Grand Slam mixed doubles results
- Australian Open: SF (1926)

Kathleen Le Messurier (12 July 1898 – 1 January 1981) was a female tennis player from Australia who was active in the 1920s and 1930s.

Le Messurier was the youngest daughter of Ernest Le Messurier (8 May 1861– 8 September 1937) and Jessie Rainforth Le Messurier, née Neill, (4 June 1878 – 16 September 1942). She played competitive tennis for the Methodist Ladies College and later the Semaphore and East Torrens Tennis Clubs.

She was a runner-up in the 1932 Australian Championships singles competition, losing in the final to compatriot Coral McInnes Buttsworth in straight sets, 4–6, 7–9. She also reached the doubles final in 1924, 1925, 1928 and 1932 but lost on all four occasions.

In October 1927 she won the singles and doubles title at the Adelaide Championships. In March 1928 she won the South Australian Championships played in Adelaide.

== Grand Slam finals ==
=== Singles (1 runner-up) ===
Result	Year	Championship	Surface	Opponent	Score
Loss	1932	Australian Championships	Grass	(Australia) Coral McInnes Buttsworth	4–6, 7–9

=== Doubles (4 runner-ups) ===
Result	Year	Championship	Surface	Partner	Opponents	Score
Loss	1924	Australian Championships	Grass	(Australia) Meryl O'Hara Wood	(Australia) Daphne Akhurst Cozens (Australia) Sylvia Lance Harper	5–7, 2–6
Loss	1925	Australian Championships	Grass	(Australia) Esna Boyd Robertson	(Australia) Daphne Akhurst Cozens (Australia) Sylvia Lance Harper	4–6, 3–6
Loss	1928	Australian Championships	Grass	(United Kingdom) Dorothy Weston	(Australia) Daphne Akhurst Cozens (Australia) Esna Boyd Robertson	3–6, 1–6
Loss	1932	Australian Championships	Grass	(United Kingdom) Dorothy Weston	(Australia) Coral McInnes Buttsworth (Australia) Marjorie Cox Crawford	2–6, 2–6

== See also ==
- Performance timelines for all female tennis players since 1978 who reached at least one Grand Slam final
