= Meryl O'Hara Wood =

Australian tennis player

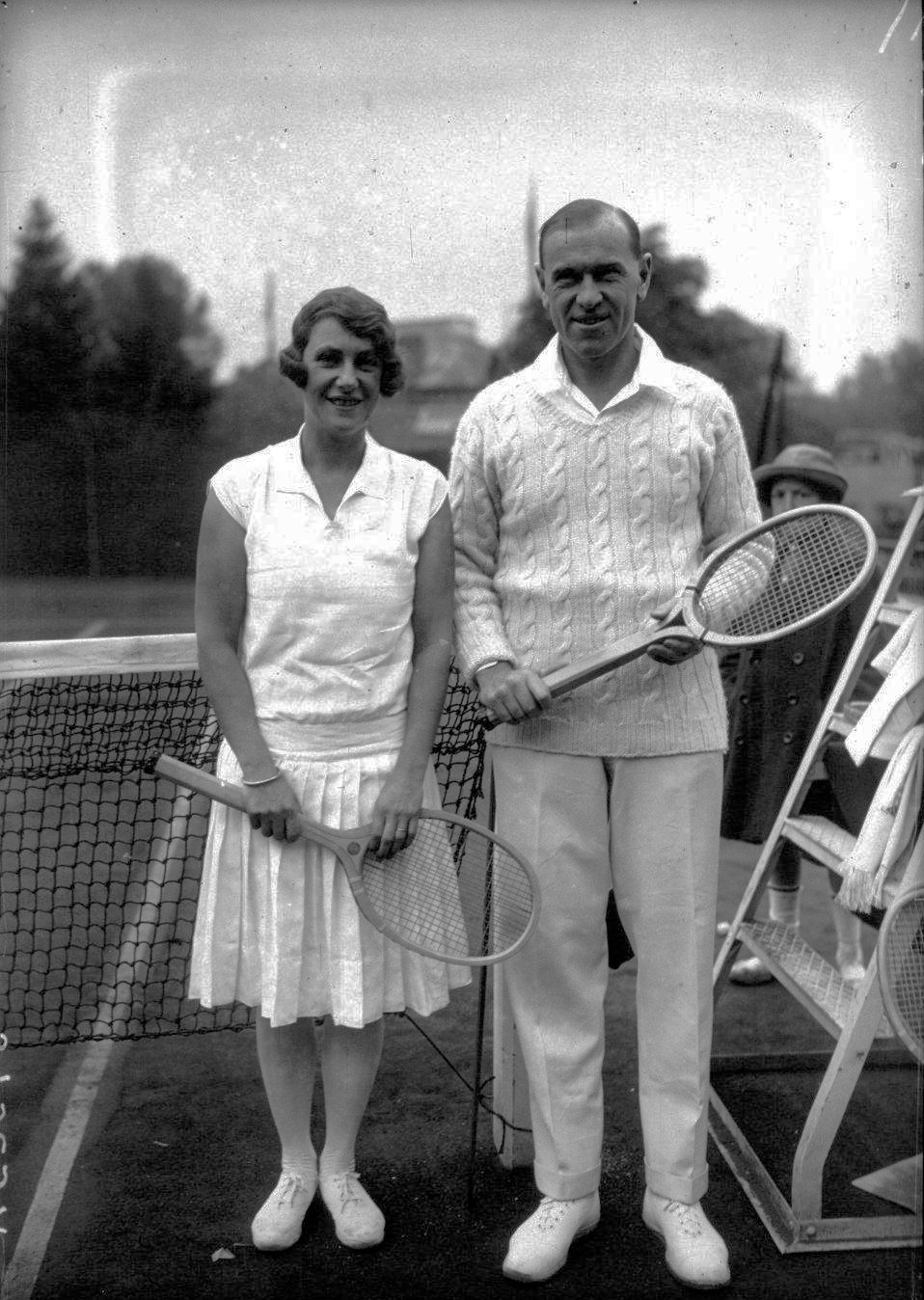
- Meryl O'Hara Wood, with Gerald Patterson, at the 1928 French Championships
- Country (sports): Australia
- Died: 6 May 1958

Singles

Grand Slam singles results
- Australian Open: SF (1928)

Doubles

Grand Slam doubles results
- Australian Open: W (1926, 1927)

Grand Slam mixed doubles results
- Australian Open: F (1932)

Meryl Aitken O'Hara Wood, née Waxman (died 6 May 1958) was an Australian tennis player active in the 1920s and 30s.

== Career ==
Wood won the women's doubles title at the Australian Championships (now the Australian Open) in 1926 and 1927. She won the 1926 title with compatriot Esna Boyd, defeating Daphne Akhurst and Marjorie Cox in the final in three close sets: 6–3, 6–8, 8–6. She successfully defended her title the following year with partner Louie Bickerton, winning in the final against Esna Boyd and Sylvia Lance in two straight sets.

On 3 August 1923, she married Australian tennis player Pat O'Hara Wood.

== Grand Slam finals ==
=== Doubles (2 titles, 2 runners-up) ===
Result	Year	Championship	Surface	Partner	Opponents	Score
Loss	1924	Australasian Championships	Grass	(Australia) Kathrine Le Mesurier	(Australia) Daphne Akhurst (Australia) Sylvia Lance Harper	5–7, 2–6
Win	1926	Australasian Championships	Grass	(Australia) Esna Boyd	(Australia) Daphne Akhurst (Australia) Marjorie Cox	6–3, 6–8, 8–6
Win	1927	Australian Championships	Grass	(Australia) Louie Bickerton	(Australia) Esna Boyd (Australia) Sylvia Lance Harper	6–3, 6–3
Loss	1929	Australian Championships	Grass	(Australia) Sylvia Lance Harper	(Australia) Daphne Akhurst (Australia) Louie Bickerton	2–6, 6–3, 2–6

=== Mixed doubles (1 runner-up) ===
Result	Year	Championship	Surface	Partner	Opponents	Score
Loss	1932	Australian Championships	Grass	(Japan) Jiro Satoh	(Australia) Marjorie Cox Crawford (Australia) Jack Crawford	8–6, 6–8, 3–6
