= Jack Cummings (tennis) =

Australian tennis player

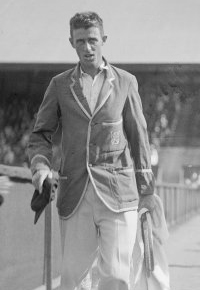
- Full name: Regner Olaf Cummings
- Country (sports): Australia
- Born: 29 Jun 1901; Wellington, New South Wales, Australia
- Died: 22 January 1972 (aged 70); Sydney, New South Wales, Australia

Singles

Grand Slam singles results
- Australian Open: F (1928)
- Wimbledon: 1R (1928)
- US Open: 2R (1928)

Doubles

Grand Slam doubles results
- Australian Open: SF (1929, 1930, 1933)

Mixed doubles

Grand Slam mixed doubles results
- Australian Open: QF (1935)

Regner Olaf "Jack" Cummings (8 May 1901 – 22 January 1972) was an Australian tennis player.

Cummings finished runner-up to Jean Borotra at the Australian Championships, the future Australian Open, in 1928. He also reached the semifinals in 1931 and the quarterfinals in 1930. Cummings won the Queensland Championships in 1926 and 1930.

Cummings turned professional in late 1935.

== Grand Slam finals ==
=== Singles (1 runner-up) ===
Result	Year	Championship	Surface	Opponent	Score
Loss	1928	Australian Championships	Grass	(France) Jean Borotra	4–6, 1–6, 6–4, 7–5, 3–6
