= Edgar Moon =

Australian tennis player

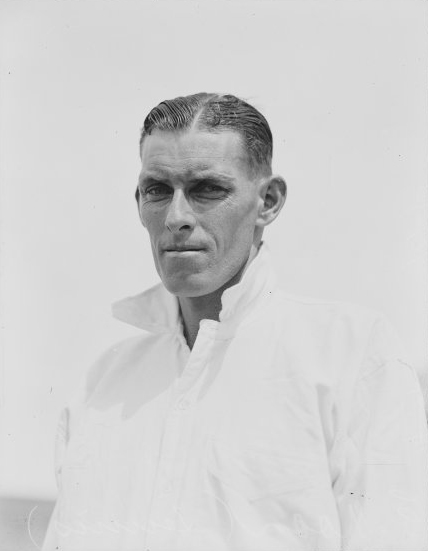
- Full name: Edgar Forest Moon
- Country (sports): Australia
- Born: 3 December 1904; Forest Hill, New South Wales, Australia
- Died: 26 May 1976 (aged 71); Greenslopes, Brisbane, Australia
- Turned pro: 1925 (amateur tour)
- Retired: 1940
- Plays: Right-handed (one-handed backhand)

Singles

Grand Slam singles results
- Australian Open: W (1930)
- French Open: QF (1930)
- Wimbledon: 4R (1928)
- US Open: 1R (1928)

Doubles

Grand Slam doubles results
- Australian Open: W (1932)

Mixed doubles

Grand Slam mixed doubles results
- Australian Open: W (1929, 1934)
- US Open: F (1928)

Team competitions
- Davis Cup: SF^{Eu} (1930)

Edgar "Gar" Moon (3 December 1904 – 26 May 1976) was a tennis player from Australia who was best known for winning the 1930 Australian Championships – Men's singles title. He also won the 1932 Men's Doubles title with Jack Crawford. He won all three men's titles at the Australian Championships.

Moon was introduced to tennis by his parents at an early age. He went to the Brisbane Grammar School where he was encouraged to play cricket but he preferred to play tennis on his parents' clay court. Moon was largely self-taught and practised his skills playing against family in Cabooltura where his father had a dairy farm. Moon was tall and strong and had good technique, but lacked dedication to the game.

In 1923 he joined the East Brisbane club, then transferred to Toombul, helping that club in 1926 to its first pennant. With some support from the umpire Cam Hammond, Moon came to be recognised as a serious Davis Cup hope, and won some good games against the likes of C. S. Buckley and Norman Peach. In 1928 he gained international experience on a tour with Cummings, appearing at Wimbledon, where he made it to the fourth round. Moon and Cummings were beaten by the American combination of Lott and Hennessy, and he did well in mixed doubles with Mrs O'Hara Wood.

Moon won his first national title at the 1929 Open when he teamed up with Daphne Akhurst to win the mixed doubles championship. In 1934, he won the Mixed Doubles title for a second time with partner Joan Hartigan.

In 1930, Moon won the Australian Open men's singles championship defeating Harry Hopman in the final 6–3, 6–1, 6–3. In 1932 the native of Queensland completed the triple, capturing the men's doubles title with partner Jack Crawford.

He played in two Davis Cup ties for the Australia Davis Cup team in 1930, against Switzerland and Ireland, and won all four of his singles matches.

Moon enlisted in the Australian Army on 17 March 1942 and reached the rank of corporal. He was discharged on 12 November 1945.

== Grand Slam finals ==
=== Singles (1 win) ===
Result	Year	Championship	Surface	Opponent	Score
Win	1930	Australian Championships	Grass	(Australia) Harry Hopman	6–3, 6–1, 6–3

=== Doubles (1 win, 3 losses) ===
Result	Year	Championship	Surface	Partner	Opponents	Score
Loss	1928	Australian Championships	Grass	(Australia) Jim Willard	(France) Jean Borotra (France) Jacques Brugnon	2–6, 6–4, 4–6, 4–6
Loss	1929	Australian Championships	Grass	(Australia) Jack Cummings	(Australia) Jack Crawford (Australia) Harry Hopman	1–6, 8–6, 6–4, 1–6, 3–6
Win	1932	Australian Championships	Grass	(Australia) Jack Crawford	(Australia) Harry Hopman (Australia) Gerald Patterson	12–10, 6–3, 4–6, 6–4
Loss	1933	Australian Championships	Grass	(Australia) Jack Crawford	(United States) Keith Gledhill (United States) Ellsworth Vines	4–6, 8–10, 2–6

=== Mixed doubles (2 wins, 1 loss) ===
Result	Year	Championship	Surface	Partner	Opponents	Score
Loss	1928	U.S. National Championships	Grass	(United States) Edith Cross	(United States) Helen Wills (Australia) Jack Hawkes	1–6, 3–6
Win	1929	Australian Championships	Grass	(Australia) Daphne Cozens	(Australia) Marjorie Crawford (Australia) Jack Crawford	6–0, 7–5
Win	1934	Australian Championships	Grass	(Australia) Joan Hartigan	(Australia) Emily Westacott (Australia) Ray Dunlop	6–3, 6–4
