= 1931 in tennis =

This page covers all the important events in the sport of tennis in 1931. It provides the results of notable tournaments throughout the year on both the men's and women's ILTF tennis circuits.

== Australian Open ==
Category	Champion(s)	Finalist(s)	Score
Men's singles	(Australia) Jack Crawford	(Australia) Harry Hopman	6–4, 6–2, 2–6, 6–1
Women's singles	(Australia) Coral McInnes Buttsworth	(Australia) Marjorie Cox Crawford	1–6, 6–3, 6–4
Men's doubles	(Australia) Charles Donohoe (Australia) Ray Dunlop	(Australia) Jack Crawford (Australia) Harry Hopman	8–6, 6–2, 5–7, 7–9, 6–4
Women's doubles	(Australia) Daphne Akhurst Cozens (Australia) Louie Bickerton	(Australia) Nell Lloyd (Australia) Gwen Utz	6–0, 6–4
Mixed doubles	(Australia) Marjorie Cox Crawford (Australia) Jack Crawford	(Australia) Emily Hood Westacott (Australia) Aubrey Willard	7–5, 6–4

== French Open ==
Category	Champion(s)	Finalist(s)	Score
Men's singles	(France) Jean Borotra	(France) Christian Boussus	2–6, 6–4, 7–5, 6–4
Women's singles	(Germany) Cilly Aussem	(United Kingdom) Betty Nuthall	8–6, 6–1
Men's doubles	(United States) George Lott (United States) John Van Ryn	(South Africa) Vernon Kirby (South Africa) Norman Farquharson	6–4, 6–3, 6–4
Women's doubles	(United Kingdom) Eileen Bennett Whittingstall (United Kingdom) Betty Nuthall	(Germany) Cilly Aussem (United States) Elizabeth Ryan	9–7, 6–2
Mixed doubles	(United Kingdom) Betty Nuthall (South Africa) Patrick Spence	(United Kingdom) Dorothy Shepherd Barron (United Kingdom) Bunny Austin	6–3, 5–7, 6–3

== Wimbledon ==
Category	Champion(s)	Finalist(s)	Score
Men's singles	(United States) Sidney Wood	(United States) Frank Shields	walkover
Women's singles	(Germany) Cilly Aussem	(Germany) Hilde Krahwinkel	6–2, 7–5
Men's doubles	(United States) George Lott (United States) John Van Ryn	(France) Jacques Brugnon (France) Henri Cochet	6–2, 10–8, 9–11, 3–6, 6–3
Women's doubles	(United Kingdom) Dorothy Shepherd-Barron (United Kingdom) Phyllis Mudford	(France) Doris Metaxa (Belgium) Josane Sigart	3–6, 6–3, 6–4
Mixed doubles	(United States) George Lott (United States) Anna Harper	(United Kingdom) Ian Collins (United Kingdom) Joan Ridley	6–3, 1–6, 6–1

== US Open ==
Category	Champion(s)	Finalist(s)	Score
Men's singles	(United States) Ellsworth Vines	(United States) George Lott	7–9, 6–3, 9–7, 7–5
Women's singles	(United States) Helen Wills Moody	(United Kingdom) Eileen Bennett Whittingstall	6–4, 6–1
Men's doubles	(United States) Wilmer Allison (United States) John Van Ryn	(United States) Gregory Mangin (United States) Berkeley Bell	6–4, 8–6, 6–3
Women's doubles	(United Kingdom) Betty Nuthall (United Kingdom) Eileen Bennett Whittingstall	(United States) Helen Jacobs (United Kingdom) Dorothy Round	6–2, 6–4
Mixed doubles	(United Kingdom) Betty Nuthall (United States) George Lott	(United States) Anna McCune Harper (United States) Wilmer Allison	6–3, 6–3
