= 1946 U.S. National Championships – Men's singles =

Men's singles
- 1946 U.S. National Championships

Final
- Champion: (United States) Jack Kramer
- Runner-up: (United States) Tom Brown
- Score: 9–7, 6–3, 6–0

Events
| Singles | men | women |
| Doubles | men | women |
| ← 1945 · | U.S. National Championships | · 1947 → |

Jack Kramer defeated Tom Brown 9–7, 6–3, 6–0 in the final to win the men's singles tennis title at the 1946 U.S. National Championships.

== Seeds ==
The seeded players are listed below. Jack Kramer is the champion; others show the round in which they were eliminated.

1. (United States) Frank Parker (quarterfinals)
2. (United States) Jack Kramer (champion)
3. (United States) Gardnar Mulloy (semifinals)
4. (United States) Bill Talbert (quarterfinals)
5. (United States) Donald McNeill (quarterfinals)
6. (United States) Tom Brown (finalist)
7. (Ecuador) Pancho Segura (quarterfinals)
8. (United States) Robert Falkenburg (semifinals)
9. (United States) Seymour Greenberg (fourth round)
10. (United States) Frank Guernsey (third round)
1. (France) Yvon Petra (second round)
2. (Argentina) Alejo Russell (fourth round)
3. (France) Pierre Pellizza (fourth round)
4. (Philippines) Felicisimo Ampon (third round)
5. (Argentina) Enrique Morea (first round)
6. (Australia) Harry Hopman (second round)
7. (France) Bernard Destremau (first round)
8. (Belgium) Philippe Washer (second round)
9. (Australia) Robert Barnes (third round)
10. (United Kingdom) Derrick Barton (third round)

== Draw ==
=== Key ===
- Q = Qualifier
- WC = Wild card
- LL = Lucky loser
- r = Retired

=== Final eight ===
Quarterfinals
7 | (Ecuador) Pancho Segura | 6 | 4 | 10 | 3
3 | (United States) Gardnar Mulloy | 4 | 6 | 12 | 6
6 | (United States) Tom Brown | 6 | 6 | 6 | 3 | 6
1 | (United States) Frank Parker | 3 | 4 | 8 | 6 | 1
8 | (United States) Robert Falkenburg | 3 | 6 | 2 | 6 | 7
4 | (United States) Bill Talbert | 6 | 1 | 6 | 2 | 5
5 | (United States) Donald McNeill | 3 | 2 | 6 | 2
2 | (United States) Jack Kramer | 6 | 6 | 1 | 6

Semifinals
3 | (United States) Gardnar Mulloy | 4 | 2 | 4
6 | (United States) Tom Brown | 6 | 6 | 6
8 | (United States) Robert Falkenburg | 0 | 4 | 4
2 | (United States) Jack Kramer | 6 | 6 | 6

Final
6 | (United States) Tom Brown | 7 | 3 | 0
2 | (United States) Jack Kramer | 9 | 6 | 6

=== Earlier rounds ===
==== Section 1 ====
First round

Second round
(2) | (Argentina) Russell | 6 | 1 | 7 | 6
(United States) Antignat | 3 | 6 | 5 | 4
(Philippines) Deyro | 6 | 6 | 6
(United States) Watson | 2 | 3 | 4
(Canada) Marois | 7 | 6 | 4 | 2 | 5
(United Kingdom) Slack | 5 | 2 | 6 | 6 | 7
(United States) Brown | 2 | 2 | 2
7 | (Ecuador) Segura | 6 | 6 | 6

Third round
(2) | (Argentina) Russell | 4 | 6 | 6 | 3 | 6
(Philippines) Deyro | 6 | 0 | 1 | 6 | 3
(United Kingdom) Slack | 2 | 0 | 2
7 | (Ecuador) Segura | 6 | 6 | 6

Fourth round
(2) | (Argentina) Russell | 2 | 2 | 7 | 4
7 | (Ecuador) Segura | 6 | 6 | 5 | 6

==== Section 2 ====
First round
(United Kingdom) Anderson | 0 | 0 | 1
3 | (United States) Mulloy | 6 | 6 | 6

Second round
(9) | (Australia) Barnes | 6 | 6 | 6
(Canada) Macken | 2 | 3 | 1
(United States) Brooks | 9 | 7 | 6
(United States) Kellogg | 7 | 5 | 4
(United Kingdom) Avory | 6 | 2 | 3 | 6
(United States) Seixas | 4 | 6 | 6 | 8
(United States) Bowden | 2 | 3 | 5
3 | (United States) Mulloy | 6 | 6 | 7

Third round
(9) | (Australia) Barnes | 4 | 3 | 5
(United States) Brooks | 6 | 6 | 7
(United States) Seixas | 3 | 3 | 2
3 | (United States) Mulloy | 6 | 6 | 6

Fourth round
(United States) Brooks | 5 | 2 | 5
3 | (United States) Mulloy | 7 | 6 | 7

==== Section 3 ====
First round
(United States) Brown | 1 | 3 | 1
(4) | (Philippines) Ampon | 6 | 6 | 6
(United States) Wood | 3 | 4 | 3
(United States) Pero | 6 | 6 | 6
(Denmark) Plougmann | w/o
(United States) Gardner
(United States) Hainline | 4 | 2 | 6 | 6 | 4
(United States) Flam | 6 | 6 | 4 | 1 | 6
(Canada) Rochon | 4 | 5 | 2
(United States) Grant | 6 | 7 | 6
(United States) Ager | 2 | 6 | 6 | 5 | 2
(United States) Schwartz | 6 | 3 | 4 | 7 | 6
(United States) Neff | 4 | 5 | 8
(United States) Falkenburg | 6 | 7 | 10
(United States) Kovaleski | 5 | 2 | 10
6 | (United States) Brown | 7 | 6 | 12

Second round
(4) | (Philippines) Ampon | 8 | 6 | 6
(United States) Pero | 6 | 3 | 1
(United States) Gardner | 4 | 2 | 5
(United States) Flam | 6 | 6 | 7
(United States) Grant | 6 | 7 | 6
(United States) Schwartz | 4 | 5 | 3
(United States) Falkenburg | 4 | 6 | 1 | 1
6 | (United States) Brown | 6 | 4 | 6 | 6

Third round
(4) | (Philippines) Ampon | 4 | 6 | 1 | 6
(United States) Flam | 6 | 3 | 6 | 8
(United States) Grant | 1 | 2 | 2
6 | (United States) Brown | 6 | 6 | 6

Fourth round
(United States) Flam | 3 | 4 | 2
6 | (United States) Brown | 6 | 6 | 6

==== Section 4 ====
First round
(7) | (France) Destremau | 4 | 4 | 10
(United States) Larned | 6 | 6 | 12
(United States) Mathey | 3 | 4 | 3
(United States) Lewis | 6 | 6 | 6
(Belgium) Van Den Eynde | 4 | 4 | 5
(United States) Tuero | 6 | 6 | 7
(United States) Molloy | 2 | 4 | 6 | 6 | 2
9 | (United States) Greenberg | 6 | 6 | 4 | 3 | 6
(5) | (Argentina) Morea | 6 | 6 | 2 | 4
(United States) Likas | 4 | 8 | 6 | 6
(United States) Kerdasha | 0 | 1 | 2
(United States) Thomas | 6 | 6 | 6
(United States) Steiner | 5 | 4 | 4
(United States) Brink | 7 | 6 | 6
(Canada) Macken | 1 | 1 | 3
1 | (United States) Parker | 6 | 6 | 6

Second round
(United States) Larned | 2 | 6 | 6 | 6
(United States) Lewis | 6 | 4 | 3 | 3
(United States) Tuero | 0 | 4 | 4
9 | (United States) Greenberg | 6 | 6 | 6
(United States) Likas | 4 | 6 | 11 | 6
(United States) Thomas | 6 | 2 | 9 | 4
(United States) Brink | 2 | 1 | 3
1 | (United States) Parker | 6 | 6 | 6

Third round
(United States) Larned | 6 | 1 | 2 | 6 | 3
9 | (United States) Greenberg | 3 | 6 | 6 | 4 | 6
(United States) Likas | 0 | 2 | 3
1 | (United States) Parker | 6 | 6 | 6

Fourth round
9 | (United States) Greenberg | 3 | 3 | 2
1 | (United States) Parker | 6 | 6 | 6

==== Section 5 ====
First round
(United States) Burrows | 4 | 1 | 4
(1) | (France) Petra | 6 | 6 | 6
(United States) Dorfman | 3 | 4 | 1
(United States) Patty | 6 | 6 | 6
(United Kingdom) Mottram | 3 | 3 | 9 | 7
(United States) Canning | 6 | 6 | 7 | 9
(United States) Hanna | 2 | 6 | 1 | 9
(United States) Masterson | 6 | 2 | 6 | 11
(United States) Yeomans | 4 | 5 | 6 | 2
(United States) Hart | 6 | 7 | 4 | 6
(United States) Holbrook | 6 | 5 | 3 | 4
(United States) Match | 3 | 7 | 6 | 6
(United States) Mathey | 0 | 1 | 1
(United States) Bartzen | 6 | 6 | 6
(Peru) Buse | 1 | 3 | 8 | 1
8 | (United States) Falkenburg | 6 | 6 | 6 | 6

Second round
(1) | (France) Petra | 4 | 7 | 4
(United States) Patty | 6 | 9 | 6
(United States) Canning | 6 | 6 | 6
(United States) Masterson | 0 | 3 | 3
(United States) Hart | 1 | 2 | 3
(United States) Match | 6 | 6 | 6
(United States) Bartzen | 5 | 4 | 2
8 | (United States) Falkenburg | 7 | 6 | 6

Third round
(United States) Patty | 3 | 6 | 6 | 6
(United States) Canning | 6 | 3 | 3 | 2
(United States) Match | 7 | 6 | 5 | 1 | 2
8 | (United States) Falkenburg | 5 | 2 | 7 | 6 | 6

Fourth round
(United States) Patty | 4 | 4 | 2
8 | (United States) Falkenburg | 6 | 6 | 6

==== Section 6 ====
First round
(United States) Carver | 5 | 3 | 4
(6) | (Australia) Hopman | 7 | 6 | 6
(United States) Carter | 3 | 6 | 6 | 8 | 11
(United States) Cooke | 6 | 8 | 2 | 6 | 13
(United States) Cushingham | w/o
(United States) Schnaars
(United States) Bellis | 5 | 1 | 0
(United States) Cochell | 7 | 6 | 6
(United States) Behrens | 2 | 3 | 2
(United States) Savitt | 6 | 6 | 6
(United States) Rodgers | 2 | 5 | 8 | 1
(United States) Kimbrell | 6 | 7 | 6 | 6
(Philippines) Sanchez | 4 | 4 | 4
(United States) Samson | 6 | 6 | 6
(United States) Vogt | 5 | 2 | 5
4 | (United States) Talbert | 7 | 6 | 7

Second round
(6) | (Australia) Hopman | 1 | 7 | 6
(United States) Cooke | 6 | 9 | 8
(United States) Schnaars | 1 | 2 | 1
(United States) Cochell | 6 | 6 | 6
(United States) Savitt | 6 | 6 | 2 | 4 | 6
(United States) Kimbrell | 4 | 2 | 6 | 6 | 4
(United States) Samson | 0 | 2 | 2
4 | (United States) Talbert | 6 | 6 | 6

Third round
(United States) Cooke | 9 | 1 | 6 | 1
(United States) Cochell | 11 | 6 | 1 | 6
(United States) Savitt | 2 | 2 | 0
4 | (United States) Talbert | 6 | 6 | 6

Fourth round
(United States) Cochell | 4 | 4 | 6
4 | (United States) Talbert | 6 | 6 | 8

==== Section 7 ====
First round
(United States) Steele Jr. | 3 | 3 | 2
(3) | (France) Pellizza | 6 | 6 | 6

Second round
(3) | (France) Pellizza | 6 | 6 | 3 | 8
(Norway) Staubo | 1 | 1 | 6 | 6
(United States) Everett | 6 | 8 | 6
(United States) Perez | 4 | 6 | 2
(Philippines) Carmona | 3 | 4 | 5
(Chile) Hammersley | 6 | 6 | 7
(Canada) McDiarmid | 3 | 2 | 4
5 | (United States) McNeill | 6 | 6 | 6

Third round
(3) | (France) Pellizza | 6 | 6 | 6
(United States) Everett | 3 | 4 | 2
(Chile) Hammersley | 3 | 3 | 3
5 | (United States) McNeill | 6 | 6 | 6

Fourth round
(3) | (France) Pellizza | 6 | 12 | 1 | 8 | 5
5 | (United States) McNeill | 4 | 14 | 6 | 6 | 7

==== Section 8 ====
First round

Second round
(8) | (Belgium) Washer | 5 | 1 | 1
(United States) Moylan | 7 | 6 | 6
(United States) Neale | 4 | 3 | 4
10 | (United States) Guernsey | 6 | 6 | 6
(10) | (United Kingdom) Barton | 4 | 6 | 9 | 3 | 6
(United States) Martin | 6 | 2 | 7 | 6 | 2
(United States) Hall | 5 | 0 | 3
2 | (United States) Kramer | 7 | 6 | 6

Third round
(United States) Moylan | 1 | 3 | 6 | 6 | 6
10 | (United States) Guernsey | 6 | 6 | 3 | 4 | 3
(10) | (United Kingdom) Barton | 1 | 0 | 3
2 | (United States) Kramer | 6 | 6 | 6

Fourth round
(United States) Moylan | 4 | 4 | 4
2 | (United States) Kramer | 6 | 6 | 6

| Preceded by 1946 French Championships – Men's singles | Grand Slam men's singles | Succeeded by 1947 Australian Championships – Men's singles |
