= 1943 in tennis =

This page covers all the important events in the sport of tennis in 1943. It provides the results of notable tournaments throughout the year on both the men's and women's ILTF tennis circuits.

== Australian Open ==
No event.

== French Open ==
No event.

== Wimbledon ==
No event.

== US Open ==
Category	Champion(s)	Finalist(s)	Score
Men's singles	(United States) Joseph R. Hunt	(United States) Jack Kramer	6–3, 6–8, 10–8, 6–0
Women's singles	(United States) Pauline Betz	(United States) Louise Brough	6–3, 5–7, 6–3
Men's doubles	(United States) Jack Kramer (United States) Frank Parker	(United States) Bill Talbert (United States) David Freeman	6–2, 6–4, 6–4
Women's doubles	(United States) Louise Brough (United States) Margaret Osborne	(United States) Pauline Betz (United States) Doris Hart	6–4, 6–3
Mixed doubles	(United States) Margaret Osborne (United States) Bill Talbert	(United States) Pauline Betz (Ecuador) Pancho Segura	10–8, 6–4
