= 1943 in sports =

Note — many sporting events did not take place because of World War II

1943 in sports describes the year's events in world sport.

== American football ==
- NFL Championship: the Chicago Bears won 41–21 over the Washington Redskins at Wrigley Field
- Notre Dame Fighting Irish – college football national championship
- Angelo Bertelli, Notre Dame quarterback, wins Heisman Trophy.

== Association football ==
- La Liga won by Athletic Bilbao
- Serie A won by Torino
- German football championship won by Dresdner SC
- Primeira Liga won by Benfica
- There is no major football competition in England, Scotland or France due to World War II. In England, several regional leagues are played but statistics from these are not counted in players’ figures.

== Australian rules football ==
- Victorian Football League – Richmond wins the 47th VFL Premiership, defeating Essendon 12.14 (86) to 11.15 (81) in the 1943 VFL Grand Final.

== Baseball ==
- World Series – New York Yankees defeat St. Louis Cardinals, 4 games to 1.
- Negro World Series – Homestead Grays defeat the Birmingham Black Barons, 4 games to 3.

== Basketball ==
NBL Championship

- Sheboygan Redskins over Fort Wayne Zollner Pistons (2–1)

Events

- The eleventh South American Basketball Championship in Lima is won by Argentina.

== Cricket ==
Events

- There is no first-class cricket in England or Australia due to World War II. A few first-class matches are played in the West Indies, South Africa and New Zealand but are not part of any official competition.

India

- Ranji Trophy – Baroda beat Hyderabad by 307 runs.
- Bombay Pentangular – Hindus

== Cycling ==
Tour de France

- not contested due to World War II

Giro d'Italia

- not contested due to World War II

== Figure skating ==
World Figure Skating Championships

- not contested due to World War II

== Golf ==
Men's professional

- Masters Tournament – not played due to World War II
- U.S. Open – not played due to World War II
- British Open – not played due to World War II
- PGA Championship – not played due to World War II

Men's amateur

- British Amateur – not played due to World War II
- U.S. Amateur – not played due to World War II

Women's professional

- Women's Western Open – Patty Berg
- Titleholders Championship – not played due to World War II

== Horse racing ==
Steeplechases

- Cheltenham Gold Cup – not held due to World War II
- Grand National – not held due to World War II

Hurdle races

- Champion Hurdle – not held due to World War II

Flat races

- Australia – Melbourne Cup won by Dark Felt^{[a]}
- Canada – King's Plate won by Paolita
- France – Prix de l'Arc de Triomphe won by Verso II^{[b]}
- Ireland – Irish Derby Stakes won by The Phoenix
- English Triple Crown Races:
  1. 2,000 Guineas Stakes – Kingsway
  2. The Derby – Straight Deal
  3. St. Leger Stakes – Herringbone
- United States Triple Crown Races:
  1. Kentucky Derby – Count Fleet
  2. Preakness Stakes – Count Fleet
  3. Belmont Stakes – Count Fleet

== Ice hockey ==
- Stanley Cup – Detroit Red Wings defeat Boston Bruins 4 games to 0.

== Motor racing ==
Events

- No major races are held anywhere worldwide due to World War II

== Rowing ==
The Boat Race

- Oxford and Cambridge Boat Race is not contested due to World War II

== Rugby league ==
- 1943 New Zealand rugby league season
- 1943 NSWRFL season
- 1942–43 Northern Rugby Football League Wartime Emergency League season / 1943–44 Northern Rugby Football League Wartime Emergency League season

== Rugby union ==
- Five Nations Championship series is not contested due to World War II

== Speed skating ==
Speed Skating World Championships

- not contested due to World War II

== Tennis ==
Australia

- Australian Men's Singles Championship – not contested
- Australian Women's Singles Championship – not contested

England

- Wimbledon Men's Singles Championship – not contested
- Wimbledon Women's Singles Championship – not contested

France

- French Men's Singles Championship – Yvon Petra (France) defeats Henri Cochet (France) — 6–3, 6–3, 6–8, 2–6, 6–4
- French Women's Singles Championship – Simone Iribarne Lafargue (France) defeats Alice Weiwers (Luxembourg) - 6–1, 7–5

USA

- American Men's Singles Championship – Joseph Hunt (USA) defeats Jack Kramer (USA) 6–3, 6–8, 10–8, 6–0
- American Women's Singles Championship – Pauline Betz Addie (USA) defeats Louise Brough Clapp (USA) 6–3, 5–7, 6–3

Davis Cup

- 1943 International Lawn Tennis Challenge – not contested

== Awards ==
- Associated Press Male Athlete of the Year: Gunder Hägg, Track and field
- Associated Press Female Athlete of the Year: Patty Berg, LPGA golf

== Notes ==
^{a} Owing to government bans on weekday sport, the Melbourne Cup was run on a Saturday from 1942 to 1944.
^{b} The 1943 Prix de l'Arc de Triomphe was run at Le Tremblay over 2,300 metres.
