= 1945 in tennis =

This page covers all the important events in the sport of tennis in 1945. It provides the results of notable tournaments throughout the year on both the men's and women's ILTF tennis circuits.

== Australian Open ==
No event.

== French Open ==
No event.

== Wimbledon ==
No event.

== US Open ==
Category	Champion(s)	Finalist(s)	Score
Men's singles	(United States) Frank Parker	(United States) William Talbert	14–12, 6–1, 6—2
Women's singles	(United States) Sarah Palfrey Cooke	(United States) Pauline Betz	3–6, 8–6, 6–4
Men's doubles	(United States) Gardnar Mulloy (United States) Bill Talbert	(United States) Bob Falkenburg (United States) Jack Tuero	12–10, 8–10, 12–10, 6–2
Women's doubles	(United States) Louise Brough (United States) Margaret Osborne	(United States) Pauline Betz (United States) Doris Hart	6–3, 6–3
Mixed doubles	(United States) Margaret Osborne (United States) Bill Talbert	(United States) Doris Hart (United States) Bob Falkenburg	6–4, 6–4
