= Imre Zichy =

Hungarian tennis player (1909–1999)

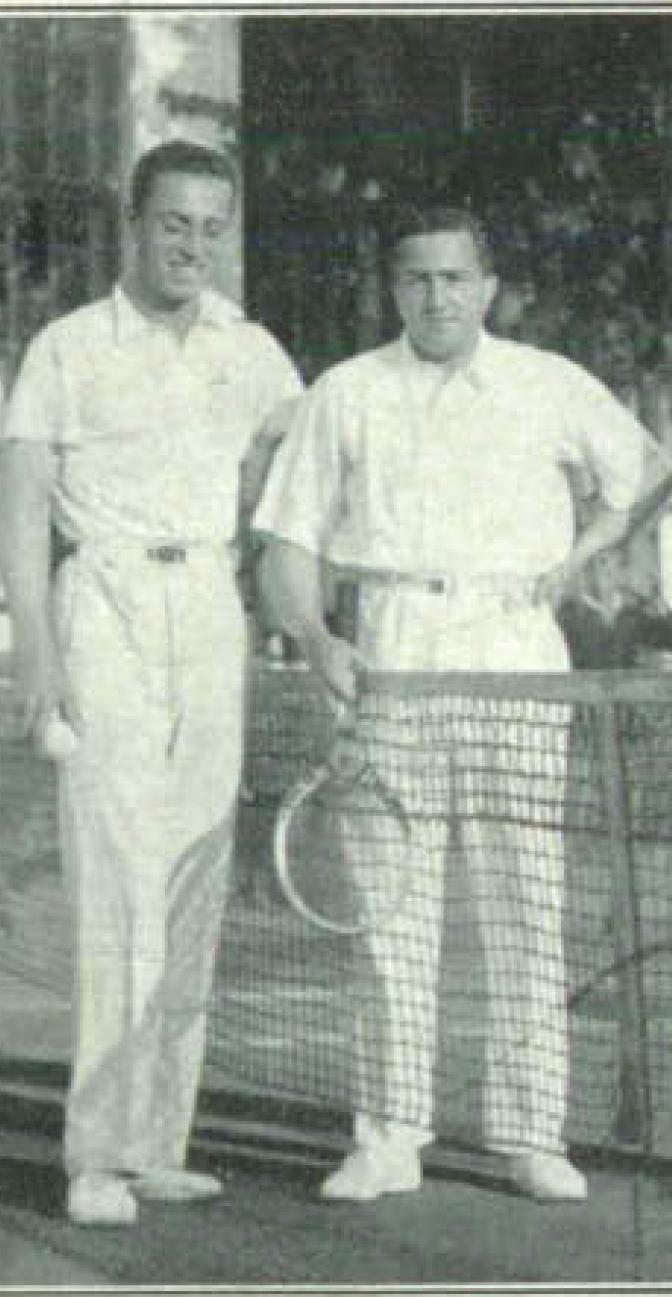
- Imre Zichy (left) and Béla von Kehrling
- Full name: Imre Georg Maria Eugen Zichy Pallavici de Zich et Vásonkő
- Country (sports): Kingdom of Hungary (1909–1943); Stateless
- Residence: Spain
- Born: 22 July 1909; Sárszentmihály, Kingdom of Hungary, Austria-Hungary (now Hungary)
- Died: 28 September 1999 (aged 90); Madrid
- Turned pro: 1930
- Plays: left-handed

Singles

Grand Slam singles results
- French Open: 2R (1932)

Doubles
- Career titles: 2

Mixed doubles
- Career titles: 1
- Last updated on: 16 February 2012.

Count Imre Zichy de Zich et Vásonkeő (Hungarian: [ˈimrɛ ˈzit͡ʃi]; 22 July 1909 – 28 September 1999) was a Hungarian left-handed amateur tennis player, count and inventor. He was related to the Hungarian Asian explorer Jenő Zichy.

During the Second World War, he emigrated to Spain where he died at the age of 90. He was a member of the Hungary Davis Cup team between 1933–34 and was mainly a doubles and mixed doubles player winning several titles during his career. He was also a three-times national doubles champion.

== Biography ==
Count Zichy was born in the family property at Sárszentmihály, being the fifth son of Count Raphael Zichy and wife, née Margravine Edina Pallavicini, and lived in Hungary until 1943, when he moved to Madrid and stay there for the rest of his life. On 29 August 1947, he married in Enschede Dutch divorcée Edith Marie Ledeboer, formerly Mrs. Oswald, and had a single child:

- Count Imre Helmich Paul Zichy (b. 28 June 1952), who married on 2 April 1979 María Teresa Sánchez-Arjona y Eyaralar, daughter of Manuel Sánchez-Arjona y Courtoy and María Teresa Eyaralar y Azcona and had five children:
  - Countess Edina Melanie Maria (b. 14 January 1980), married on 30 April 2010 Jose Márquez y Gonzalez de Gregorio, eldest son of Rafael Márquez, 9th Count of las Torres de Alcorrín and former wife Pilar González de Gregorio, 13th Duchess of Fernandina
  - Countess Stephanie Charlotte Maria (b. 27 September 1983), married Álvaro Rosillo Echevarría, son of the late Francisco de Borja Rosillo y Colón de Carvajal and Virgina de Echevarría y Wakonigg.
  - Count Imre Enrique Ignacio (b. 18 August 1987)
  - Count Nándor Károly (b. 8 August 1989)
  - Countess Teresa Manuela (b. 7 Juni 1992)

In 1957, he invented the reversing light for cars and its operating system. Imre Zichy died on 28 September 1999 in Madrid. His funeral was held at the San Agustín del Guadalix Church on 26 October 1999.

== Tennis career ==
Count Zichy started his tennis career by competing in the Hungarian Junior Championships where he was a runner-up for the doubles and third in singles in 1929. Later he won the Hungarian National Tennis Championships in doubles (1931, '32, '34) and in mixed doubles (1931). He also won the Hungarian International Tennis Championships in doubles in 1931 and 1932. He kept playing tennis in Spain.

=== Doubles ===
Legend (singles)
International Championships (3)

==== Titles ====
No.	Date	Tournament	Surface	Partner	Opponents	Score
1.	1931	Oradean Championships	N/A	(Hungary) Béla von Kehrling	(Poland) Popławski / (Poland) Stolarow	3–6, 6–0, 6–2, 6–2
2.	1931	Hungarian International Championships	N/A	(Hungary) Emil Gabrovitz	(Hungary) Béla von Kehrling/ (Socialist Federal Republic of Yugoslavia) Franjo Šefer	11–13, 6–3, 6–2, 1–6, 7–5

==== Runner-up ====
No.	Date	Tournament	Surface	Partner	Opponents	Score
1.	1931	Budapest International Championships	N/A	(Socialist Federal Republic of Yugoslavia) Iván Balás	(Hungary) Béla von Kehrling / (Hungary) Emil Gabrovitz	N/A
2.	1931	Warsaw International Championships	N/A	(Socialist Federal Republic of Yugoslavia) Iván Balás	(Czechoslovakia) Ferenc Marsalek / (Czechoslovakia) Josef Siba	6–3, 2–6, 6–1, 3–6, 6–4
3.	1931	Tatra International Tournament	N/A	(Austria) Franz Wilhelm Matejka	(Czechoslovakia) Roderich Menzel/ (Czechoslovakia) Klein	w/o
4.	1932	Italian Riviera Championships	N/A	(Hungary) Béla von Kehrling	(Republic of Ireland) George Lyttleton-Rogers/ (Japan) Tatsuyoshi Miki	4–6, 8–6, 6–4, 7–5
5.	1944	San Sebastian international	N/A	(Spain) Mario Szawost	(Spain) Fernando Olózaga/ (Spain) Julio Fleischner	6–0, 6–4, 0–6, 7–5

=== Mixed doubles ===
==== Titles ====
No.	Date	Tournament	Surface	Partner	Opponents	Score
1.	1931	Hungarian International Championships	N/A	(Romania) Lenke Zizovits	(Hungary) Béla von Kehrling / Mrs. Deutch	w/o

==== Runner-up ====
No.	Date	Tournament	Surface	Partner	Opponents	Score
1.	1931	Budapest International Championships	N/A	(Hungary) Jankovich	(Hungary) Béla von Kehrling / Szapáry	N/A

=== Davis Cup ===
Europe Zone
Round	Date	Opponents	Final match score	Venue	Surface	Match	Opponent	Rubber score
1R	5 – 7 May 1933	Japan	0–5	Budapest	N/A			
1R	5 – 7 May 1933	Japan	0–5	Budapest	N/A	Doubles (with Emil Gabrovitz)	Jiro Sato / Ryosuki Nunoi	0–6, 1–6, 2–6 (L)
2R	3 – 5 Aug 1934	Norway	3–2	Budapest	Clay			
2R	3 – 5 Aug 1934	Norway	3–2	Budapest	Clay	Doubles (with Emil Ferenczy)	Johan Haanes / Finn-Trygve Smith	6–3, 4–6, 6–4, 4–6, 3–6 (L)
QF	31 Aug – 2 Sep 1934	Yugoslavia	2–3	Budapest	N/A			
QF	31 Aug – 2 Sep 1934	Yugoslavia	2–3	Budapest	N/A	Doubles (with Emil Gabrovitz)	Franjo Šefer / Franjo Punčec	4–6, 4–6, 3–6 (L)

=== Friendly/Exhibition matches ===
Outcome	Date	Tournament	Surface	Partner	Opponents	Score
loss	1931	Cluj-Napoca	N/A	(Socialist Federal Republic of Yugoslavia) Ivan Balás	(France) Henri Cochet / André Merlin	6–0, 6–2
loss (4–2)	1931	Hungary–Italy friendly team match	N/A	(Hungary) Emil Gabrovitz	Italy	N/A

Outcome	Date	Tournament	Surface	Opponent	Score
Draw	1931	Cluj-Napoca	N/A	(Romania) Michael Cantacuzène	6–6

== Ancestry ==
Ancestors of Imre Zichy

16. Count Ferenc Zichy
8. Count Edmund Zichy
17. Countess Maria Dominika zu Lodron-Laterano
4. Count Eugen Zichy
18. Innocenzo, 4th Prince Odescalchi
9. Princess Paolina Odescalchi
19. Countess Anna Luisa Keglevich
2. Count Raphael Zichy
20. Count Wilhelm von Redern
10. Count Heinrich Alexander von Redern
21. Wilhelmine von Otterstedt
5. Countess Hermine von Redern
22. Innocenzo, 4th Prince Odescalchi (=18)
11. Princess Vittoria Odescalchi
23. Countess Anna Luisa Keglevich (=19)
1. Count Imre Zichy
24. Margrave Eduard Pallavicini
12. Margrave Arthur Alexander Pallavicini
25. Countess Josephine Hardegg
6. Margrave Eduard Pallavicini
26. Count Johann Baptist Spaur
13. Countess Theresia Spaur
27. Countess Amalie Bissingen
3. Margravine Edina Pallavicini
7. Countess Adele Mailath

== Bibliography ==
- Béla von Kehrling, ed. (1931). Tennisz és Golf. III (Budapest, Hungary: Egyesült Kő-, Könyvnyomda. Könyv- és Lapkiadó Rt.) 1–24 (in Hungarian). Retrieved 10 February 2012.
