= Frank Guernsey =

Frank Guernsey may refer to:

- Frank E. Guernsey (1866–1927), U.S. Representative from Maine
- Frank Guernsey (tennis) (1917–2008), American tennis player
