= 1945 U.S. National Championships – Men's singles =

Men's singles
- 1945 U.S. National Championships

Final
- Champion: (United States) Frank Parker
- Runner-up: (United States) Bill Talbert
- Score: 14–12, 6–1, 6–2

Events
Singles	men	women
Doubles	men	women
← 1944 ·	U.S. National Championships	· 1946 →

Frank Parker defeated Bill Talbert 14–12, 6–1, 6–2 in the final to win the men's singles tennis title at the 1945 U.S. National Championships.

== Seeds ==
The seeded players are listed below. Frank Parker is the champion; others show the round in which they were eliminated.

1. (United States) Frank Parker (champion)
2. (United States) Bill Talbert (finalist)
3. (Ecuador) Pancho Segura (semifinals)
4. (United States) Gardnar Mulloy (second round)
5. (United States) Frank Shields (third round)
6. (United States) Elwood Cooke (semifinals)
7. (United States) Seymour Greenberg (quarterfinals)
8. (United States) Robert Falkenburg (quarterfinals)
1. (Chile) Andrés Hammersley (second round)
2. (Argentina) Heraldo Weiss (first round)
3. (Argentina) Alejo Russell (quarterfinals)
4. (Czechoslovakia) Ladislav Hecht (second round)
5. (Mexico) Francisco Guerrero-Arcocha (second round)
6. (Canada) Henri Rochon (first round)
7. (Canada) Brendan Macken (second round)

== Draw ==
=== Key ===
- Q = Qualifier
- WC = Wild card
- LL = Lucky loser
- r = Retired

=== Finals ===
Quarterfinals
1	(United States) Frank Parker	6	6	6
7	(United States) Seymour Greenberg	2	3	2
(United States) Sidney Wood	12	5	4	6	0
6	(United States) Elwood Cooke	10	7	6	2	6
2	(United States) Bill Talbert	6	6	9
(3)	(Argentina) Alejo Russell	1	2	7
3	(Ecuador) Pancho Segura	6	4	6	6
8	(United States) Robert Falkenburg	2	6	1	1

Semifinals
1	(United States) Frank Parker	6	8	7
6	(United States) Elwood Cooke	1	6	5
2	(United States) Bill Talbert	7	6	6
3	(Ecuador) Pancho Segura	5	3	4

Final
1	(United States) Frank Parker	14	6	6
2	(United States) Bill Talbert	12	1	2

=== Earlier rounds ===
==== Section 1 ====
First round

Second round
1	(United States) Parker	6	6
(United States) Ball	1	2
(United States) Ray	6	6
(5)	(Mexico) Guerrero-Arcocha	4	2
7	(United States) Greenberg	6	6
(United States) Chambers	1	3
(United States) Molloy
(4)	(Czechoslovakia) Hecht	w/o

Third round
1	(United States) Parker	6	6
(United States) Ray	1	0
7	(United States) Greenberg	6	6
(United States) Molloy	1	1

Quarterfinals
1	(United States) Parker	6	6	6
7	(United States) Greenberg	2	3	2

==== Section 2 ====
First round
4	(United States) Mulloy	6	6
(United States) Schwartz	4	4
(United States) Guernsey	8	6
(United States) Rowbotham	6	4
(United States) Buzolich	6	6
(United States) McManus	4	4
(United States) Wood	6	8
(6)	(Canada) Rochon	3	6
6	(United States) Cooke	6	6
(United States) Bartzen	1	4
(United States) Hall	6	6
(United States) Steele Jr.	4	1
(United States) Brown	6	6	6
(United States) Burke	8	4	1
(United States) Flam	6	6
(2)	(Argentina) Weiss	1	2

Second round
4	(United States) Mulloy	6	3	4
(United States) Guernsey	4	6	6
(United States) Buzolich	3	3
(United States) Wood	6	6
6	(United States) Cooke	6	5	6
(United States) Hall	3	7	2
(United States) Brown	5	2
(United States) Flam	7	6

Third round
(United States) Guernsey	3	2
(United States) Wood	6	6
6	(United States) Cooke	6	6
(United States) Flam	2	2

Quarterfinals
(United States) Wood	12	5	4	6	0
6	(United States) Cooke	10	7	6	2	6

==== Section 3 ====
First round
2	(United States) Talbert	6	6
(United States) Hunt	1	0
(United States) Dixon	6	4	6
(United States) Bender	2	6	4
(United States) Behrens	6	6
(United States) West	0	3
(7)	(Canada) Macken	6	7
(United States) Van Ryn	3	5
5	(United States) Shields	6	6
(United States) Hamilton	3	2
(United States) Moylan	8	6
(United States) Giles	6	2
(United States) Peacock	6	6
(United States) Osten	0	3
(3)	(Argentina) Russell	7	6
(United States) Tuero	5	2

Second round
2	(United States) Talbert	6	6
(United States) Dixon	3	2
(United States) Behrens	3	6	6
(7)	(Canada) Macken	6	3	3
5	(United States) Shields	6	6
(United States) Moylan	3	2
(United States) Peacock	2	3
(3)	(Argentina) Russell	6	6

Third round
2	(United States) Talbert	6	6
(United States) Behrens	1	4
5	(United States) Shields	6	4	2
(3)	(Argentina) Russell	4	6	6

Quarterfinals
2	(United States) Talbert	6	6	9
(3)	(Argentina) Russell	1	2	7

==== Section 4 ====
First round

Second round
3	(United States) Segura	6	6
(United States) Buttimer	2	4
(United States) Surface	6	3	6
(United States) Thomas	4	6	3
8	(United States) Falkenburg	6	6
(United States) Henderson	2	2
(United States) Livingstone	6	1	6
(1)	(Chile) Hammersley	3	6	3

Third round
3	(United States) Segura	7	6	6
(United States) Surface	5	8	2
8	(United States) Falkenburg	7	6
(United States) Livingstone	5	4

Quarterfinals
3	(United States) Segura	6	4	6	6
8	(United States) Falkenburg	2	6	1	1

Preceded by 1945 Wimbledon Championships – Men's singles	Grand Slam men's singles	Succeeded by 1946 Australian Championships – Men's singles
