= 1939 U.S. National Championships – Men's singles =

Men's singles
- 1939 U.S. National Championships

Final
- Champion: (United States) Bobby Riggs
- Runner-up: (United States) Welby Van Horn
- Score: 6–4, 6–2, 6–4

Events
Singles	men	women		boys	girls
Doubles	men	women	mixed	boys	girls
- U.S. National Championships

Bobby Riggs defeated Welby Van Horn 6–4, 6–2, 6–4 in the final to win the men's singles tennis title at the 1939 U.S. National Championships.

== Seeds ==
The tournament used two lists of eight players for seeding the men's singles event; one for U.S. players and one for foreign players. Bobby Riggs is the champion; others show the round in which they were eliminated.

U.S.

1. (United States) Bobby Riggs (champion)
2. (United States) Frank Parker (fourth round)
3. (United States) Elwood Cooke (fourth round)
4. (United States) Don McNeill (quarterfinals)
5. (United States) Bryan Grant (fourth round)
6. (United States) Joe Hunt (semifinals)
7. (United States) Gardnar Mulloy (fourth round)
8. (United States) Wayne Sabin (quarterfinals)

Foreign

1. (Australia) Adrian Quist (fourth round)
2. (Kingdom of Yugoslavia) Franjo Punčec (first round)
3. (Australia) John Bromwich (semifinals)
4. (Australia) Harry Hopman (quarterfinals)
5. (Germany) Henner Henkel (first round)
6. (Australia) Jack Crawford (third round)
7. (Kingdom of Yugoslavia) Franjo Kukuljević (first round)
8. (Czechoslovakia) Ladislav Hecht (third round)

== Draw ==
=== Key ===
- Q = Qualifier
- WC = Wild card
- LL = Lucky loser
- r = Retired

=== Finals ===
Quarterfinals
1	(United States) Bobby Riggs	6	10	6
7	(Australia) Harry Hopman	1	8	3
7	(United States) Donald McNeill	4	13	10	6	2
11	(United States) Joseph Hunt	6	15	8	4	6
19	(United States) Gilbert Hunt	3	4	1
5	(Australia) John Bromwich	6	6	6
(United States) Welby Van Horn	4	2	6	7	6
15	(United States) Wayne Sabin	6	6	4	5	3

Semifinals
1	(United States) Bobby Riggs	6	6	4	6
11	(United States) Joseph Hunt	1	2	6	1
5	(Australia) John Bromwich	6	6	2	4	6
(United States) Welby Van Horn	2	4	6	6	8

Final
1	(United States) Bobby Riggs	6	6	6
(United States) Welby Van Horn	4	2	4

=== Earlier rounds ===
==== Section 1 ====
First round

Second round
1	(United States) Riggs	2	6	6	10
(Philippines) Ampon	6	4	4	8
(United States) Dee	5	6	10	4	8
(United States) Davenport	7	3	8	6	6
17	(United States) Mako	4	4	0
(United States) Alloo	6	6	6
(United States) York	3	3	4
15	(Czechoslovakia) Hecht	6	6	6

Third round
1	(United States) Riggs	6	8	6
(United States) Dee	1	6	4
(United States) Alloo	6	9	1	8	6
15	(Czechoslovakia) Hecht	4	11	6	6	0

Fourth round
1	(United States) Riggs	6	6	8
(United States) Alloo	4	2	6

==== Section 2 ====
First round

Second round
9	(United States) Grant	6	16	6
(United States) Wood	3	14	4
(United States) Surface	w/o
(United States) Decker
(United States) Froehling	3	0	6	4
(United States) Lubin	6	6	4	6
(United States) Boulware	4	2	4
7	(Australia) Hopman	6	6	6

Third round
9	(United States) Grant	6	6	6
(United States) Decker	3	0	2
(United States) Lubin	4	6	7	3
7	(Australia) Hopman	6	0	9	6

Fourth round
9	(United States) Grant	5	5	7	3
7	(Australia) Hopman	7	7	5	6

==== Section 3 ====
First round
(United States) Buxby
(Jamaica) Nunes	w/o
(United States) Talbert	6	6	6
(Canada) Le Clerc	0	2	3
(United States) Freeman	7	6	8
(United States) Jacoby	5	3	6
(United States) Kerdasha
9	(Germany) Henkel	w/o

Second round
7	(United States) McNeill	6	5	6	6
(Kingdom of Yugoslavia) Palada	3	7	4	0
(United States) Bobbitt	6	6	8
(United States) Umstaedter	4	1	6
(United States) Buxby	6	3	6	4
(United States) Talbert	4	6	8	6
(United States) Freeman	7	6	6
(United States) Kerdasha	5	4	4

Third round
7	(United States) McNeill	6	9	6
(United States) Bobbitt	1	7	1
(United States) Talbert	6	6	2	6
(United States) Freeman	1	3	6	2

Fourth round
7	(United States) McNeill	6	6	6
(United States) Talbert	3	2	3

==== Section 4 ====
First round
11	(United States) Hunt	6	6	6
(United States) Swanson	2	2	1
(United States) Kramer	6	12	8	10
(United States) Bickel	0	14	6	8
(United States) Heldman	6	6	6
(United States) Kamrath	4	4	4
19	(Australia) Crawford	6	6	6
(United States) Rood	0	1	4
(United States) Schroeder	6	6	4	6
(United States) Mattmann	2	4	6	4
(United States) Bellis	6	6	6
(United States) Johnson	2	1	4
(United States) Toley	6	6	6
(United States) Anderson	3	3	4
(United States) Guernsey	6	3	2	6	7
3	(Kingdom of Yugoslavia) Punčec	1	6	6	3	5

Second round
11	(United States) Hunt	6	3	5	6	6
(United States) Kramer	2	6	7	4	3
(United States) Heldman	7	6	4	3	1
19	(Australia) Crawford	5	2	6	6	6
(United States) Schroeder	6	6	6
(United States) Bellis	4	4	0
(United States) Toley	0	4	0
(United States) Guernsey	6	6	6

Third round
11	(United States) Hunt	6	3	4	6	7
19	(Australia) Crawford	1	6	6	1	5
(United States) Schroeder	3	3	6
(United States) Guernsey	6	6	8

Fourth round
11	(United States) Hunt	6	7	4	6
(United States) Guernsey	4	5	6	4

==== Section 5 ====
First round
3	(United States) Parker	6	6	6
(Philippines) Sanchez	0	1	1
(United States) Mahoney	0	6	6	1	6
(United States) Bushman	6	4	4	6	3
(United States) Low	6	6	7
(United States) Hawley	3	3	5
17	(United Kingdom) Hare	6	6	6
(United States) Nielsen	2	0	3
19	(United States) Hunt	6	6	11	6
(United States) Hall	4	3	13	2
(United States) Bowden	6	6	8
(United States) Adelsberg	2	4	6
(United States) Prusoff	6	6	6
(Canada) Duff	2	1	4
(United States) Sutter	6	2	3	6	6
13	(Kingdom of Yugoslavia) Kukuljević	4	6	6	3	3

Second round
3	(United States) Parker	6	6	6
(United States) Mahoney	2	4	2
(United States) Low	4	1	0
17	(United Kingdom) Hare	6	6	6
19	(United States) Hunt	3	7	6	6
(United States) Bowden	6	5	1	4
(United States) Prusoff	6	6	6
(United States) Sutter	4	2	1

Third round
3	(United States) Parker	6	6	3	7
17	(United Kingdom) Hare	4	2	6	5
19	(United States) Hunt	6	1	7	7	6
(United States) Prusoff	2	6	9	5	1

Fourth round
3	(United States) Parker	1	1	1
19	(United States) Hunt	6	6	6

==== Section 6 ====
First round
13	(United States) Mulloy
(France) Brugnon	w/o
(United States) Podesta	6	1	6	6
(United States) Curtiss	2	6	4	3
(United States) Greenberg	6	3	7	3	6
(United States) Hudlow	2	6	5	6	2
(United States) McGehee
(United States) Tidball	w/o

Second round
13	(United States) Mulloy	4	2	6	6	8
(United States) Podesta	6	6	1	4	6
(United States) Greenberg	2	1	3
(United States) McGehee	6	6	6
(United States) Lewis
(United States) Antignat	w/o
(United States) Shields	2	3	2
5	(Australia) Bromwich	6	6	6

Third round
13	(United States) Mulloy	6	5	6	6
(United States) McGehee	2	7	4	3
(United States) Lewis	5	4	1
5	(Australia) Bromwich	7	6	6

Fourth round
13	(United States) Mulloy	5	1	2
5	(Australia) Bromwich	7	6	6

==== Section 7 ====
First round

Second round
5	(United States) Cooke
(United States) Robertson	w/o
(United States) Anderson
(United States) Giles	w/o
(United States) Ganzenmuller	0	7	3	2
(United States) Steele Jr.	6	5	6	6
(United States) Van Horn
11	(France) Destremau	w/o

Third round
5	(United States) Cooke	6	6	6
(United States) Walter Anderson	3	3	3
(United States) Steele Jr.	7	10	6	8
(United States) Van Horn	5	12	8	10

Fourth round
5	(United States) Cooke	3	10	4	5
(United States) Van Horn	6	8	6	7

==== Section 8 ====
First round

Second round
15	(United States) Sabin	6	6	8
(United States) Fishbach	4	4	6
21	(Kingdom of Yugoslavia) Mitić	6	4	7	6	7
(United States) Everett	2	6	9	2	5
(United States) Everett	6	0	3
(United States) Doeg	8	6	6
(United States) Gillespie	0	2	1
1	(Australia) Quist	6	6	6

Third round
15	(United States) Sabin	6	6	6
21	(Kingdom of Yugoslavia) Mitić	1	0	4
(United States) Doeg	9	2	8	3	0
1	(Australia) Quist	7	6	6	6	6

Fourth round
15	(United States) Sabin	11	4	8	6
1	(Australia) Quist	9	6	6	1

Preceded by 1939 Wimbledon Championships	Grand Slams; Men's Singles	Succeeded by 1940 U.S. National Championships
