= 1931 Australian Championships – Men's singles =

Men's singles
- 1931 Australian Championships

Final
- Champion: (Australia) Jack Crawford
- Runner-up: (Australia) Harry Hopman
- Score: 6–4, 6–2, 2–6, 6–1

Details
- Draw: 32 (4Q) (Note: Fifteen players had to play in two preliminary rounds. Four winners qualified into the first round of the competition proper.)
- Seeds: 8

Events
| Singles | men | women | | boys | girls |
| Doubles | men | women | mixed | boys | girls |
- Australian Championships

Jack Crawford defeated Harry Hopman 6–4, 6–2, 2–6, 6–1 in the final to win the men's singles tennis title at the 1931 Australian Championships.

== Seeds ==
The seeded players are listed below. Jack Crawford is the champion; others show the round in which they were eliminated.

1. (Australia) Jack Crawford (champion)
2. (Australia) Harry Hopman (finalist)
3. (Australia) Gar Moon (quarterfinals)
4. (Australia) Jack Cummings (semifinals)
5. (Australia) Clifford Sproule (quarterfinals)
6. (Australia) Ray Dunlop (first round)
7. (Australia) Harry Hassett (quarterfinals)
8. (Australia) Don Turnbull (semifinals)

== Draw ==
=== Key ===
- Q = Qualifier
- WC = Wild card
- LL = Lucky loser
- r = Retired

Quarterfinals
1 | (Australia) Jack Crawford | 6 | 3 | 6 | 6
5 | (Australia) Clifford Sproule | 0 | 6 | 0 | 3
3 | (Australia) Gar Moon | 7 | 6 | 3 | 6 | 2
8 | (Australia) Don Turnbull | 9 | 2 | 6 | 4 | 6
2 | (Australia) Harry Hopman | 5 | 6 | 6 | 6
(Australia) Aubrey Willard | 7 | 3 | 4 | 4
4 | (Australia) Jack Cummings | 6 | 6 | 6
7 | (Australia) Harry Hassett | 2 | 2 | 4

Semifinals
1 | (Australia) Jack Crawford | 6 | 6 | 12
8 | (Australia) Don Turnbull | 2 | 2 | 10
2 | (Australia) Harry Hopman | 8 | 6 | 6
4 | (Australia) Jack Cummings | 6 | 2 | 4

Finals
1 | (Australia) Jack Crawford | 6 | 6 | 2 | 6
2 | (Australia) Harry Hopman | 4 | 2 | 6 | 1

=== Earlier rounds ===
==== Section 1 ====
First round
1 | (Australia) Crawford | 7 | 8 | 6
(Australia) Teague | 5 | 6 | 3
(Australia) Walker | w/o
(Australia) McMichael
5 | (Australia) Sproule | 6 | 6 | 6
(Australia) Tonkin | 2 | 3 | 0
(Australia) Peach | 4 | 6 | 6 | 6 | 6
Q | (Australia) Tytherleigh | 6 | 2 | 8 | 2 | 3
3 | (Australia) Moon | 6 | 6 | 6
(Australia) Smith | 1 | 3 | 1
(Australia) Quist | w/o
(Australia) G. Thomas
8 | (Australia) Turnbull | 6 | 6 | 6
(Australia) Purcell | 0 | 2 | 0
Q | (Australia) O'Connor | 6 | 6 | 7
(Australia) R. Thomas | 3 | 1 | 5

Second round
1 | (Australia) Crawford | 6 | 6 | 6
(Australia) Walker | 0 | 1 | 2
5 | (Australia) Sproule | 6 | 6 | 6
(Australia) Peach | 0 | 2 | 1
3 | (Australia) Moon | 3 | 7 | 6
(Australia) Quist | 6 | 5 | 3 | r
8 | (Australia) Turnbull | 6 | 6 | 6
Q | (Australia) O'Connor | 1 | 1 | 2

Quarterfinals
1 | (Australia) Crawford | 6 | 3 | 6 | 6
5 | (Australia) Sproule | 0 | 6 | 0 | 3
3 | (Australia) Moon | 7 | 6 | 3 | 6 | 2
8 | (Australia) Turnbull | 9 | 2 | 6 | 4 | 6

Semifinals
1 | (Australia) Crawford | 6 | 6 | 12
8 | (Australia) Turnbull | 2 | 2 | 10

==== Section 2 ====
First round
2 | (Australia) Hopman | 6 | 6 | 4 | 6
(Australia) J. Willard | 1 | 3 | 6 | 1
(Australia) Moore | w/o
(Australia) Du. Thompson
(Australia) A. Willard | 6 | 2 | 3 | 6 | 6
6 | (Australia) Dunlop | 0 | 6 | 6 | 3 | 4
Q | (Australia) Chrystal | 6 | 6
(Australia) Knight | 0 | 2 | r
4 | (Australia) Cummings | 5 | 6 | 6 | 6
(Australia) Schwartz | 7 | 2 | 3 | 0
(Australia) Donohoe | 6 | 6 | 3 | 6
(Australia) Shepherd | 1 | 1 | 6 | 3
7 | (Australia) Hassett | 6 | 6 | 5 | 8
(Australia) Ewin | 0 | 1 | 7 | 6
(Australia) Da. Thompson | 7 | 6 | 7
Q | (Australia) Huxtable | 5 | 0 | 5

Second round
2 | (Australia) Hopman | 6 | 6 | 6
(Australia) Moore | 2 | 4 | 1
(Australia) A. Willard | 4 | 6 | 6 | 6
Q | (Australia) Chrystal | 6 | 2 | 2 | 1
4 | (Australia) Cummings | 3 | 3 | 6 | 7 | 6
(Australia) Donohoe | 6 | 6 | 1 | 5 | 3
7 | (Australia) Hassett | w/o
(Australia) Da. Thompson

Quarterfinals
2 | (Australia) Hopman | 5 | 6 | 6 | 6
(Australia) A. Willard | 7 | 3 | 4 | 4
4 | (Australia) Cummings | 6 | 6 | 6
7 | (Australia) Hassett | 2 | 2 | 4

Semifinals
2 | (Australia) Hopman | 8 | 6 | 6
4 | (Australia) Cummings | 6 | 2 | 4

== Notes ==
| Preceded by 1930 U.S. National Championships | Grand Slam men's singles | Succeeded by 1931 French Championships |
