= 1931 Australian Championships – Mixed doubles =

Mixed doubles
- 1931 Australian Championships

Final
- Champions: (Australia) Marjorie Crawford (Australia) Jack Crawford
- Runners-up: (Australia) Emily Hood Westacott (Australia) Aubrey Willard
- Score: 7–5, 6–4

Details
- Draw: 24
- Seeds: 4

Events
Singles	men	women		boys	girls
Doubles	men	women	mixed	boys	girls
- Australian Championships

Nell Hall and Harry Hopman were the defending champions and the second seeds, but they lost in the semifinals.

The first-seeded Marjorie Crawford and Jack Crawford defeated unseeded Emily Hood Westacott and Aubrey Willard 7–5, 6–4 in the final, to win the mixed doubles tennis title at the 1931 Australian Championships.

== Seeds ==
1. (Australia) Marjorie Crawford / (Australia) Jack Crawford (champions)
2. (Australia) Nell Hall / (Australia) Harry Hopman (semifinals)
3. (Australia) Louie Bickerton / (Australia) James Willard (quarterfinals)
4. (Australia) Sylvia Harper / (Australia) Gar Moon (quarterfinals)

== Draw ==
Key

- Q = Qualifier
- WC = Wild card
- LL = Lucky loser
- Alt = Alternate
- ITF = ITF entry
- PR = Protected ranking
- SR = Special ranking
- SE = Special exempt
- JE = Junior exempt
- JR = Junior Accelerator Programme entrant
- CO = College Accelerator Programme entrant
- NG = Next Gen Accelerator Program entrant
- w/o = Walkover
- r = Retired
- d = Defaulted

=== Finals ===
Quarterfinals
2	(Australia) Nell Hall (Australia) Harry Hopman	7	4	6
(Australia) Mall Molesworth (Australia) Jack Cummings	5	6	4
(Australia) Emily Hood Westacott (Australia) Aubrey Willard	6	7
4	(Australia) Sylvia Harper (Australia) Gar Moon	4	9	r^{a}
1	(Australia) Marjorie Crawford (Australia) Jack Crawford	1	6	6
(Australia) Kathleen Le Messurier (Australia) Don Turnbull	6	3	1
(Australia) Ula Valkenburg (Australia) Charles Donohoe	3	6	8
3	(Australia) Louie Bickerton (Australia) James Willard	6	1	6

Semifinals
2	(Australia) Nell Hall (Australia) Harry Hopman	10	2	5
(Australia) Emily Hood Westacott (Australia) Aubrey Willard	8	6	7
1	(Australia) Marjorie Crawford (Australia) Jack Crawford	3	6	6
(Australia) Ula Valkenburg (Australia) Charles Donohoe	6	1	3

Final
(Australia) Emily Hood Westacott (Australia) Aubrey Willard	5	4
1	(Australia) Marjorie Crawford (Australia) Jack Crawford	7	6

=== Earlier rounds ===
==== Section 1 ====
First round
(Australia) Emily Hood Westacott (Australia) Aubrey Willard	6	7
(Australia) Ruth Tann (Australia) Harry Hassett	3	5
(Australia) Birdie Bond (Australia) Allan Knight	2	6	6
(Australia) Youtha Anthony (Australia) Willis Teague	6	3	2
(Australia) Dorothy Weston (Australia) Rupert Shepherd	6	7
(Australia) Mary Derham (Australia) Reg Ewin	3	5
4	(Australia) Sylvia Harper (Australia) Gar Moon	6	6
(Australia) Gwen Utz (Australia) Norman Peach	1	4

Second round
2	(Australia) Nell Hall (Australia) Harry Hopman	5	10	6
(Australia) Joan Hartigan (Australia) Clifford Sproule	7	8	4
(Australia) Mall Molesworth (Australia) Jack Cummings	6	7
(Australia) Florence Francisco (Australia) V. Edwards	2	5
(Australia) Emily Hood Westacott (Australia) Aubrey Willard	6	7
(Australia) Birdie Bond (Australia) Allan Knight	1	5
(Australia) Dorothy Weston (Australia) Rupert Shepherd	4	2
4	(Australia) Sylvia Harper (Australia) Gar Moon	6	6

Quarterfinals
2	(Australia) Nell Hall (Australia) Harry Hopman	7	4	6
(Australia) Mall Molesworth (Australia) Jack Cummings	5	6	4
(Australia) Emily Hood Westacott (Australia) Aubrey Willard	6	7
4	(Australia) Sylvia Harper (Australia) Gar Moon	4	9	r^{a}

Semifinals
2	(Australia) Nell Hall (Australia) Harry Hopman	10	2	5
(Australia) Emily Hood Westacott (Australia) Aubrey Willard	8	6	7

==== Section 2 ====
First round
1	(Australia) Marjorie Crawford (Australia) Jack Crawford	6	6
(Australia) Jean Wilson (Australia) Thomas ^{[b]}	3	0
(Australia) Barbara Bolger (Australia) Jim Fitzgerald	w/o
(Australia) partner (Australia) Len Schwartz
(Australia) Pattie Meaney (Australia) Paul Haege	9	6
(Australia) Muff Wilson (Australia) Jack McCausland	7	0
(Australia) Kathleen Le Messurier (Australia) Don Turnbull	6	4	6
(Australia) Frances Hoddle-Wrigley (Australia) Walker ^{[c]}	2	6	4

Second round
1	(Australia) Marjorie Crawford (Australia) Jack Crawford	w/o
(Australia) Barbara Bolger (Australia) Jim Fitzgerald
(Australia) Pattie Meaney (Australia) Paul Haege	6	4	4
(Australia) Kathleen Le Messurier (Australia) Don Turnbull	3	6	6
(Australia) Ula Valkenburg (Australia) Charles Donohoe	w/o
(Australia) Mrs. L. Baker (Australia) Toss O'Connor
3	(Australia) Louie Bickerton (Australia) James Willard	6	7
(Australia) Betty Ward (Australia) Ted Budrodeen	2	5

Quarterfinals
1	(Australia) Marjorie Crawford (Australia) Jack Crawford	1	6	6
(Australia) Kathleen Le Messurier (Australia) Don Turnbull	6	3	1
(Australia) Ula Valkenburg (Australia) Charles Donohoe	3	6	8
3	(Australia) Louie Bickerton (Australia) James Willard	6	1	6

Semifinals
1	(Australia) Marjorie Crawford (Australia) Jack Crawford	3	6	6
(Australia) Ula Valkenburg (Australia) Charles Donohoe	6	1	3

== Notes ==
- a Because of rain this match had to be ceased with the score at one set all. It was scheduled to resume the next day, but Mrs. Harper severely strained a muscle of a leg in the preceding semifinal of the women's singles and had to withdraw.
- ^{b} Probably either Robert K. Thomas or George Thomas – both played in the men's singles and doubles events.
- ^{c} Most likely William Bruce Walker who played in the men's singles and doubles events.
