= 1944 in tennis =

This page covers all the important events in the sport of tennis in 1944. It provides the results of notable tournaments throughout the year on both the men's and women's ILTF tennis circuits.

== Australian Open ==
No event.

== French Open ==
No event.

== Wimbledon ==
No event.

== US Open ==
Category	Champion(s)	Finalist(s)	Score
Men's singles	(United States) Frank Parker	(United States) William Talbert	6–4, 3–6, 6–3, 6–3
Women's singles	(United States) Pauline Betz	(United States) Margaret Osborne	6–3, 8–6
Men's doubles	(United States) Don McNeill (United States) Bob Falkenburg	(United States) Bill Talbert (Ecuador) Pancho Segura	7–5, 6–4, 3–6, 6–1
Women's doubles	(United States) Louise Brough (United States) Margaret Osborne	(United States) Pauline Betz (United States) Doris Hart	4–6, 6–4, 6–3
Mixed doubles	(United States) Margaret Osborne (United States) Bill Talbert	(United States) Dorothy Bundy (United States) Don McNeill	6–2, 6–3
