= 1931 Australian Championships =

- Date: 27 February – 8 March 1931
- Edition: 24th
- Category: Grand Slam (ITF)
- Surface: Grass
- Location: Sydney, New South Wales, Australia
- Venue: White City Tennis Club

Champions

Men's singles
- (Australia) Jack Crawford

Women's singles
- (Australia) Coral McInnes Buttsworth

Men's doubles
- (Australia) Charles Donohoe / (Australia) Ray Dunlop

Women's doubles
- (Australia) Daphne Akhurst Cozens / (Australia) Louise Bickerton

Mixed doubles
- (Australia) Marjorie Cox Crawford / (Australia) Jack Crawford

Boys' singles
- (Australia) Bruce Moore

Girls' singles
- (Australia) Joan Hartigan

Boys' doubles
- (Australia) Jack Purcell / (Australia) Bert Tonkin

Girls' doubles
- (Australia) Sadie Moon / (Australia) Emily Hood Westacott
- Australian Championships

The 1931 Australian Championships was a tennis tournament that took place on outdoor Grass courts at the White City Tennis Club, Sydney, Australia from 27 February to 9 March. It was the 24th edition of the Australian Championships (now known as the Australian Open), the 6th held in Sydney, and the first Grand Slam tournament of the year. The singles titles were won by Australians Jack Crawford and Coral McInnes Buttsworth.

== Finals ==
=== Men's singles ===
(Australia) Jack Crawford defeated (Australia) Harry Hopman 6–4, 6–2, 2–6, 6–1

=== Women's singles ===
(Australia) Coral McInnes Buttsworth defeated (Australia) Marjorie Cox Crawford 1–6, 6–3, 6–4

=== Men's doubles ===
(Australia) Charles Donohoe / (Australia) Ray Dunlop defeated (Australia) Jack Crawford / (Australia) Harry Hopman 8–6, 6–2, 5–7, 7–9, 6–4

=== Women's doubles ===
(Australia) Daphne Akhurst Cozens / (Australia) Louie Bickerton defeated (Australia) Nell Lloyd / (Australia) Gwen Utz 6–0, 6–4

=== Mixed doubles ===
(Australia) Marjorie Cox Crawford / (Australia) Jack Crawford defeated (Australia) Emily Hood Westacott / (Australia) Aubrey Willard 7–5, 6–4

| Preceded by 1930 U.S. National Championships | Grand Slams | Succeeded by 1931 French Championships |
