= 1931 Australian Championships – Women's singles =

Women's singles
- 1931 Australian Championships

Final
- Champion: (Australia) Coral Buttsworth
- Runner-up: (Australia) Marjorie Crawford
- Score: 1–6, 6–3, 6–4

Details
- Draw: 32
- Seeds: 8

Events
Singles	men	women		boys	girls
Doubles	men	women	mixed	boys	girls
- Australian Championships

Coral Buttsworth defeated Marjorie Crawford 1–6, 6–3, 6–4, in the final to win the women's singles tennis title at the 1931 Australian Championships.

== Seeds ==
The seeded players are listed below. Coral Buttsworth is the champion; others show the round in which they were eliminated.

1. (Australia) Marjorie Crawford (finalist)
2. (Australia) Sylvia Harper (semifinals)
3. (Australia) Louie Bickerton (quarterfinals)
4. (Australia) Coral Buttsworth (champion)
5. (Australia) Mall Molesworth (first round)
6. (Australia) Emily Hood Westacott (first round)
7. (Australia) Ula Valkenburg (first round)
8. (Australia) Kathleen Le Messurier (semifinals)

== Draw ==
=== Key ===
- Q = Qualifier
- WC = Wild card
- LL = Lucky loser
- r = Retired

=== Finals ===
Quarterfinals
4	(Australia) Coral Buttsworth	6	6
(Australia) Frances Hoddle-Wrigley	1	2
2	(Australia) Sylvia Harper	6	6
(Australia) Pattie Meaney	1	2
1	(Australia) Marjorie Crawford	6	4	6
(Australia) Joan Hartigan	4	6	4
8	(Australia) Kathleen Le Messurier	6	6
3	(Australia) Louie Bickerton	1	3

Semifinals
4	(Australia) Coral Buttsworth	0	6	0
2	(Australia) Sylvia Harper	6	4	0^{r}
1	(Australia) Marjorie Crawford	3	6	7
8	(Australia) Kathleen Le Messurier	6	2	5

Finals
4	(Australia) Coral Buttsworth	1	6	6
1	(Australia) Marjorie Crawford	6	3	4

=== Earlier rounds ===
==== Section 1 ====
First round
4	(Australia) Coral Buttsworth	6	6
(Australia) Dorothy Bellamy	1	3
(Australia) Vera Selwin	6	6
(Australia) Kath Coleman	2	2
(Australia) Muff Wilson	6	6
(Australia) Mary Derham	1	4
(Australia) Frances Hoddle-Wrigley	7	6	7
5	(Australia) Mall Molesworth	9	1	5
2	(Australia) Sylvia Harper	3	6	6
(Australia) Ruth Tann	6	1	3
(Australia) Floris Conway	6	2	6
(Australia) Jean Wilson	0	6	1
(Australia) Pattie Meaney	6	6
(Australia) Sadie Moon	4	1
(Australia) Birdie Bond	6	5	8
6	(Australia) Emily Hood Westacott	4	7	6

Second round
4	(Australia) Coral Buttsworth	6	6
(Australia) Vera Selwin	3	1
(Australia) Muff Wilson	3	9	4
(Australia) Frances Hoddle-Wrigley	6	7	6
2	(Australia) Sylvia Harper	6	6
(Australia) Floris Conway	1	0
(Australia) Pattie Meaney	6	7	7
(Australia) Birdie Bond	8	5	5

Quarterfinals
4	(Australia) Coral Buttsworth	6	6
(Australia) Frances Hoddle-Wrigley	1	2
2	(Australia) Sylvia Harper	6	6
(Australia) Pattie Meaney	1	2

Semifinals
4	(Australia) Coral Buttsworth	0	6	0
2	(Australia) Sylvia Harper	6	4	0^{r}

==== Section 2 ====
First round
1	(Australia) Marjorie Crawford	6	6
(Australia) Betty Ward	0	0
(Australia) Dorothy Dingle	6	6
(Australia) Edna Gardyne	0	2
(Australia) Dorothy Weston	w/o
(Australia) Phyllis Lester
(Australia) Joan Hartigan	7	6
7	(Australia) Ula Valkenburg	5	4
8	(Australia) Kathleen Le Messurier	6	6
(Australia) Helen McTaggett	2	2
(Australia) E. Darvall	6	7
(Australia) Enid Williams	3	5
(Australia) Gwen Utz	6	1	6
(Australia) Youtha Anthony	1	6	3
3	(Australia) Louie Bickerton	6	2	6
(Australia) Nell Hall	2	6	3

Second round
1	(Australia) Marjorie Crawford	6	6
(Australia) Dorothy Dingle	0	3
(Australia) Dorothy Weston	3	8	2
(Australia) Joan Hartigan	6	6	6
8	(Australia) Kathleen Le Messurier	6	6
(Australia) E. Darvall	1	0
(Australia) Gwen Utz	5	4
3	(Australia) Louie Bickerton	7	6

Quarterfinals
1	(Australia) Marjorie Crawford	6	4	6
(Australia) Joan Hartigan	4	6	4
8	(Australia) Kathleen Le Messurier	6	6
3	(Australia) Louie Bickerton	1	3

Semifinals
1	(Australia) Marjorie Crawford	3	6	7
8	(Australia) Kathleen Le Messurier	6	2	5

== Notes ==
- a Mrs. Harper severely strained a muscle of a leg and had to withdraw.

Preceded by 1930 U.S. National Championships – Women's singles	Grand Slam women's singles	Succeeded by 1931 French Championships – Women's singles
