= 1931 Australian Championships – Women's doubles =

Women's doubles
- 1931 Australian Championships

Final
- Champions: (Australia) Louie Bickerton (Australia) Daphne Akhurst Cozens
- Runners-up: (Australia) Nell Lloyd (Australia) Gwen Utz
- Score: 6–0, 6–4

Details
- Draw: 21
- Seeds: 4

Events
| Singles | men | women | | boys | girls |
| Doubles | men | women | mixed | boys | girls |
- Australian Championships

The first-seeded Louie Bickerton and Daphne Akhurst Cozens defeated the unseeded Nell Lloyd and Gwen Utz 6–0, 6–4 in the final, to win the women's doubles tennis title at the 1931 Australian Championships.

== Seeds ==
1. (Australia) Louie Bickerton / (Australia) Daphne Akhurst Cozens (champions)
2. (Australia) Marjorie Cox / (Australia) Sylvia Harper (semifinals)
3. (Australia) Mall Molesworth / (Australia) Emily Hood Westacott (semifinals)
4. (Australia) Dorothy Dingle / (Australia) Ula Valkenburg (quarterfinals)

== Draw ==
Key

- Q = Qualifier
- WC = Wild card
- LL = Lucky loser
- Alt = Alternate
- ITF = ITF entry
- PR = Protected ranking
- SR = Special ranking
- SE = Special exempt
- JE = Junior exempt
- JR = Junior Accelerator Programme entrant
- CO = College Accelerator Programme entrant
- NG = Next Gen Accelerator Program entrant
- w/o = Walkover
- r = Retired
- d = Defaulted

=== Finals ===
Quarterfinals
2 | (Australia) Marjorie Cox (Australia) Sylvia Harper | 6 | 4 | 6
(Australia) Kathleen Le Messurier (Australia) Dorothy Weston | 2 | 6 | 3
4 | (Australia) Dorothy Dingle (Australia) Ula Valkenburg | 6 | 4 | 5
(Australia) Nell Lloyd (Australia) Gwen Utz | 4 | 6 | 7
1 | (Australia) Louie Bickerton (Australia) Daphne Akhurst Cozens | 9 | 6
(Australia) Birdie Bond (Australia) Phyllis Lester | 7 | 3
(Australia) Mary Derham (Australia) Ruth Tann
3 | (Australia) Mall Molesworth (Australia) Emily Hood Westacott | w/o

Semifinals
2 | (Australia) Marjorie Cox (Australia) Sylvia Harper (Note: Mrs. Harper severely strained a muscle of a leg in the semifinal of the women's singles earlier that day and had to withdraw from all events she participated in.)
(Australia) Nell Lloyd (Australia) Gwen Utz | w/o
1 | (Australia) Louie Bickerton (Australia) Daphne Akhurst Cozens | 2 | 7 | 7
3 | (Australia) Mall Molesworth (Australia) Emily Hood Westacott | 6 | 5 | 5

Final
(Australia) Nell Lloyd (Australia) Gwen Utz | 0 | 4
1 | (Australia) Louie Bickerton (Australia) Daphne Akhurst Cozens | 6 | 6

=== Earlier rounds ===
==== Section 1 ====
First round
(Australia) I. Burns (Australia) Alison Hattersley | 6 | 6
(Australia) Edna Gardyne (Australia) Pattie Meaney | 4 | 4
(Australia) Agnes Scott (Australia) Gwen Stevenson | 7 | 2 | 10
(Australia) Betty Ward (Australia) Jean Wilson | 5 | 6 | 8
(Australia) Nell Lloyd (Australia) Gwen Utz | 6 | 6
(Australia) E. Darvall (Australia) G. Tunney | 2 | 1

Second round
2 | (Australia) Marjorie Cox (Australia) Sylvia Harper | 6 | 6
(Australia) Coral Buttsworth (Australia) Nell Hall | 2 | 3
(Australia) Kathleen Le Messurier (Australia) Dorothy Weston | 6 | 6
(Australia) Floris Conway (Australia) Muff Wilson | 3 | 2
4 | (Australia) Dorothy Dingle (Australia) Ula Valkenburg | 6 | 6
(Australia) I. Burns (Australia) Alison Hattersley | 4 | 4
(Australia) Agnes Scott (Australia) Gwen Stevenson | 0 | 0
(Australia) Nell Lloyd (Australia) Gwen Utz | 6 | 6

Quarterfinals
2 | (Australia) Marjorie Cox (Australia) Sylvia Harper | 6 | 4 | 6
(Australia) Kathleen Le Messurier (Australia) Dorothy Weston | 2 | 6 | 3
4 | (Australia) Dorothy Dingle (Australia) Ula Valkenburg | 6 | 4 | 5
(Australia) Nell Lloyd (Australia) Gwen Utz | 4 | 6 | 7

Semifinals
2 | (Australia) Marjorie Cox (Australia) Sylvia Harper
(Australia) Nell Lloyd (Australia) Gwen Utz | w/o

==== Section 2 ====
First round
1 | (Australia) Louie Bickerton (Australia) Daphne Akhurst Cozens | 6 | 6
(Australia) Dorothy Anderson (Australia) Nancy Chitty | 3 | 0 | (Note: Some sources give 6–4 as a result of the first set.)
(Australia) Youtha Anthony (Australia) Frances Hoddle-Wrigley | 6 | 5 | 6
(Australia) Gwen Cassidy (Australia) Hazel Grassick | 0 | 7 | 4

Second round
1 | (Australia) Louie Bickerton (Australia) Daphne Akhurst Cozens | 6 | 6
(Australia) Youtha Anthony (Australia) Frances Hoddle-Wrigley | 2 | 2
(Australia) Birdie Bond (Australia) Phyllis Lester | 6 | 6
(Australia) Dorothy Bellamy (Australia) Mary Edgar | 3 | 4
(Australia) Mary Derham (Australia) Ruth Tann | 6 | 9
(Australia) Kath Coleman (Australia) Sadie Moon | 2 | 7
3 | (Australia) Mall Molesworth (Australia) Emily Hood Westacott | 6 | 4 | 6
(Australia) Vera Selwin (Australia) Helen McTaggett | 4 | 6 | 4

Quarterfinals
1 | (Australia) Louie Bickerton (Australia) Daphne Akhurst Cozens | 9 | 6
(Australia) Birdie Bond (Australia) Phyllis Lester | 7 | 3
(Australia) Mary Derham (Australia) Ruth Tann
3 | (Australia) Mall Molesworth (Australia) Emily Hood Westacott | w/o

Semifinals
1 | (Australia) Louie Bickerton (Australia) Daphne Akhurst Cozens | 2 | 7 | 7
3 | (Australia) Mall Molesworth (Australia) Emily Hood Westacott | 6 | 5 | 5
