= 1943 U.S. National Championships (tennis) =

- Date: September 1 – 6
- Edition: 63rd
- Category: Grand Slam (ITF)
- Surface: Grass
- Location: Forest Hills, Queens; New York City, New York
- Venue: West Side Tennis Club

Champions

Men's singles
- (United States) Joseph R. Hunt

Women's singles
- (United States) Pauline Betz

Men's doubles
- (United States) Jack Kramer / (United States) Frank Parker

Women's doubles
- (United States) Louise Brough / (United States) Margaret Osborne

Mixed doubles
- (United States) Margaret Osborne / (United States) Bill Talbert
- U.S. National Championships

The 1943 U.S. National Championships (now known as the US Open) was a tennis tournament that took place on the outdoor grass courts at the West Side Tennis Club, Forest Hills in New York City, New York. The tournament ran from September 1 until September 6. It was the 63rd staging of the U.S. National Championships and due to World War II it was the only Grand Slam tennis event of the year.

== Finals ==
=== Men's singles ===
(United States) Joseph R. Hunt defeated (United States) Jack Kramer 6–3, 6–8, 10–8, 6–0

=== Women's singles ===
(United States) Pauline Betz defeated (United States) Louise Brough 6–3, 5–7, 6–3

=== Men's doubles ===
(United States) Jack Kramer / (United States) Frank Parker defeated (United States) Bill Talbert / (United States) David Freeman 6–2, 6–4, 6–4

=== Women's doubles ===
(United States) Louise Brough / (United States) Margaret Osborne defeated (United States) Pauline Betz / (United States) Doris Hart 6–4, 6–3

=== Mixed doubles ===
(United States) Margaret Osborne / (United States) Bill Talbert defeated (United States) Pauline Betz / (Ecuador) Pancho Segura 10–8, 6–4

Preceded by 1942 U.S. National Championships	Grand Slams	Succeeded by 1944 U.S. National Championships
