= Henry Prusoff =

American tennis player

Henry J. Prusoff
- Country (sports): United States
- Born: December 10, 1912 Cleveland, Ohio, US
- Died: May 1943 (aged 30)

Singles
- Highest ranking: No. 8 (U.S. in 1940)

Grand Slam singles results
- US Open: 4R (1940)

Doubles
- Highest ranking: No. 3 (U.S. in 1930s)

Grand Slam doubles results
- US Open: F (1940)

Henry J. Prusoff (nicknamed "the Russian Bear"; December 10, 1912 – May 1943) was a top-ranked American tennis player in both singles and doubles in the 1930s. Prusoff was ranked No. 3 in doubles during the 1930s, and No. 8 in singles in the U.S. in 1940.

== Early life ==
He was born in Cleveland, Ohio, and was Jewish. He later lived in Seattle, Washington. He attended Garfield High School in Seattle.

== Tennis career ==
Prusoff won the singles and doubles titles at the Oregon State Tennis Championship in 1932. In 1933 he played in the US Championships, but was defeated in the round of 128 by Keith Gledhill.

In 1934, Prusoff won the singles title and reached the doubles final at the Cincinnati Open, then known as the Tri-State. Prusoff knocked off the No. 1 seed, Walter M. Martin of Canada, in the quarterfinals en route to the singles title.

Also in 1934 he played in the US Championships where he was defeated in the round of 64 by John Van Ryn.

In 1935, while ranked 13th in the United States and after defeating Sandy Davenport at the U.S. Championships in the round of 64 (but losing in the round of 32 to Frank Shields), Prusoff sustained a very bad, near-fatal back injury from which he nevertheless eventually made a surprising recovery.

By 1939, Prusoff was ranked No. 10 in singles in the US (after returning to the U.S. Championships, where he beat Lewis Duff in the round of 128 and Ernest Sutter in the round of 64, but lost to Gilbert Hunt in the round of 32), and in 1940 he was ranked No. 8 (after at the U.S. Championships he beat Gilbert Hall in the round of 64 and Edwin Armark in the round of 32, but lost to Jack Kramer in the round of 16).

In both 1935 and 1939 he was nominated for the Seattle Post-Intelligencer Man of the Year sports award.

He died in 1943 at the age of 30 of a rare blood disease.

== Grand Slam finals ==
=== Doubles (1 runner-up) ===
Result	Year	Championship	Surface	Partner	Opponents	Score
Loss	1941	U.S. National Championships	Grass	(United States) Gardnar Mulloy	(United States) Jack Kramer (United States) Ted Schroeder	4–6, 6–8, 7–9

== See also ==
- List of select Jewish tennis players
