= 1944 U.S. National Championships (tennis) =

- Date: August 30 – September 4
- Edition: 64th
- Category: Grand Slam (ITF)
- Surface: Grass
- Location: Forest Hills, Queens; New York City, New York
- Venue: West Side Tennis Club

Champions

Men's singles
- (United States) Frank Parker

Women's singles
- (United States) Pauline Betz

Men's doubles
- (United States) Don McNeill / (United States) Bob Falkenburg

Women's doubles
- (United States) Louise Brough / (United States) Margaret Osborne

Mixed doubles
- (United States) Margaret Osborne / (United States) Bill Talbert
- U.S. National Championships

The 1944 U.S. National Championships (now known as the US Open) was a tennis tournament that took place on the outdoor grass courts at the West Side Tennis Club, Forest Hills in New York City, New York. The tournament ran from August 30 until September 4. It was the 64th staging of the U.S. National Championships and due to World War II it was the only Grand Slam tennis event of the year.

== Finals ==
=== Men's singles ===
(United States) Frank Parker defeated (United States) William Talbert 6–4, 3–6, 6–3, 6–3

=== Women's singles ===
(United States) Pauline Betz defeated (United States) Margaret Osborne 6–3, 8–6

=== Men's doubles ===
(United States) Don McNeill / (United States) Bob Falkenburg defeated (United States) Bill Talbert / (Ecuador) Pancho Segura 7–5, 6–4, 3–6, 6–1

=== Women's doubles ===
(United States) Louise Brough / (United States) Margaret Osborne defeated (United States) Pauline Betz / (United States) Doris Hart 4–6, 6–4, 6–3

=== Mixed doubles ===
(United States) Margaret Osborne / (United States) Bill Talbert defeated (United States) Dorothy Bundy / (United States) Don McNeill 6–2, 6–3

Preceded by 1943 U.S. National Championships	Grand Slams	Succeeded by 1945 U.S. National Championships
