= 1931 Australian Championships – Men's doubles =

Men's doubles
- 1931 Australian Championships

Final
- Champions: (Australia) Charles Donohoe (Australia) Ray Dunlop
- Runners-up: (Australia) Jack Crawford (Australia) Harry Hopman
- Score: 8–6, 6–2, 5–7, 7–9, 6–4

Details
- Draw: 16
- Seeds: 4

Events
Singles	men	women		boys	girls
Doubles	men	women	mixed	boys	girls
- Australian Championships

The third seeds Charles Donohoe and Ray Dunlop defeated the defending champions Jack Crawford and Harry Hopman 8–6, 6–2, 5–7, 7–9, 6–4 in the final, to win the men's doubles tennis title at the 1931 Australian Championships.

Because of falling light this match had to be ceased on a scheduled day (Saturday, 7 March) with the score at two sets to one for Donohoe/Dunlop and 7–7 in the fourth. The play was resumed on Monday, 9 March.

== Seeds ==
1. (Australia) Jack Crawford / (Australia) Harry Hopman (final)
2. (Australia) Dave Thompson / (Australia) Jim Willard (semifinals)
3. (Australia) Charles Donohoe / (Australia) Ray Dunlop (champions)
4. (Australia) Rupert Shepherd / (Australia) Don Turnbull (semifinals)

== Draw ==
Key

- Q = Qualifier
- WC = Wild card
- LL = Lucky loser
- Alt = Alternate
- ITF = ITF entry
- PR = Protected ranking
- SR = Special ranking
- SE = Special exempt
- JE = Junior exempt
- JR = Junior Accelerator Programme entrant
- CO = College Accelerator Programme entrant
- NG = Next Gen Accelerator Program entrant
- w/o = Walkover
- r = Retired
- d = Defaulted

=== Draw ===
First round
1	(Australia) Jack Crawford (Australia) Harry Hopman	6	6	1	6
(Australia) Jack Cummings (Australia) Bruce Walker	2	4	6	4
(Australia) Reg Ewin (Australia) Bill Steley	6	6	6
(Australia) F. Bowen (Australia) W. Warren	4	2	2
(Australia) Ted Budrodeen (Australia) Cecil Ward	6	6	6
(Australia) Dick McMichael (Australia) Bob Thomas	3	4	4
4	(Australia) Rupert Shepherd (Australia) Don Turnbull	6	6	6
(Australia) Jack Purcell (Australia) Bert Tonkin	4	2	3
2	(Australia) Dave Thompson (Australia) Jim Willard	7	6	6
(Australia) Harold Doctor (Australia) Gar Moon	5	4	4
(Australia) Angus Smith (Australia) Duncan Thompson	6	5	6	6
(Australia) Len Schwartz (Australia) George Thomas	3	7	4	3	(Note: Some sources give 6–2 as a result of the last set.)
(Australia) Harry Hassett (Australia) Willis Teague	6	6	6
(Australia) Bruce Moore (Australia) Adrian Quist	4	4	1
3	(Australia) Charles Donohoe (Australia) Ray Dunlop	6	1	6	6	6
(Australia) Norman Peach (Australia) Aubrey Willard	8	6	1	4	4

Quarterfinals
1	(Australia) Jack Crawford (Australia) Harry Hopman	w/o
(Australia) Reg Ewin (Australia) Bill Steley
(Australia) Ted Budrodeen (Australia) Cecil Ward	1	3	3	(Note: Some sources give 1–6 as a result of the second set.)
4	(Australia) Rupert Shepherd (Australia) Don Turnbull	6	6	6
2	(Australia) Dave Thompson (Australia) Jim Willard	w/o
(Australia) Angus Smith (Australia) Duncan Thompson
(Australia) Harry Hassett (Australia) Willis Teague	6	0	6	1	1
3	(Australia) Charles Donohoe (Australia) Ray Dunlop	4	6	3	6	6

Semifinals
1	(Australia) Jack Crawford (Australia) Harry Hopman	6	6	6
4	(Australia) Rupert Shepherd (Australia) Don Turnbull	3	4	3
2	(Australia) Dave Thompson (Australia) Jim Willard	2	8	4	3
3	(Australia) Charles Donohoe (Australia) Ray Dunlop	6	6	6	6

Final
1	(Australia) Jack Crawford (Australia) Harry Hopman	6	2	7	9	4
3	(Australia) Charles Donohoe (Australia) Ray Dunlop	8	6	5	7	6
