= 1945 U.S. National Championships (tennis) =

- Date: August 28 – September 3
- Edition: 65th
- Category: Grand Slam (ILTF)
- Surface: Grass
- Location: Forest Hills, Queens; New York City, New York
- Venue: West Side Tennis Club

Champions

Men's singles
- (United States) Frank Parker

Women's singles
- (United States) Sarah Palfrey Cooke

Men's doubles
- (United States) Gardnar Mulloy / (United States) Bill Talbert

Women's doubles
- (United States) Louise Brough / (United States) Margaret Osborne

Mixed doubles
- (United States) Margaret Osborne / (United States) Bill Talbert
- U.S. National Championships

The 1945 U.S. National Championships (now known as the US Open) was a tennis tournament that took place on the outdoor grass courts at the West Side Tennis Club, Forest Hills in New York City, New York. The tournament ran from August 28 until September 3. It was the 65th staging of the U.S. National Championships, and due to World War II it was the only Grand Slam tennis event of the year.

== Finals ==
=== Men's singles ===
(United States) Frank Parker defeated (United States) William Talbert 14–12, 6–1, 6—2

=== Women's singles ===
(United States) Sarah Palfrey Cooke defeated (United States) Pauline Betz 3–6, 8–6, 6–4

=== Men's doubles ===
(United States) Gardnar Mulloy / (United States) Bill Talbert defeated (United States) Bob Falkenburg / (United States) Jack Tuero 12–10, 8–10, 12–10, 6–2

=== Women's doubles ===
(United States) Louise Brough / (United States) Margaret Osborne defeated (United States) Pauline Betz / (United States) Doris Hart 6–3, 6–3

=== Mixed doubles ===
(United States) Margaret Osborne / (United States) Bill Talbert defeated (United States) Doris Hart / (United States) Bob Falkenburg 6–4, 6–4

Preceded by 1944 U.S. National Championships	Grand Slams	Succeeded by 1946 Australian Championships
