= 1944 U.S. National Championships – Men's singles =

Men's singles
- 1944 U.S. National Championships

Final
- Champion: (United States) Frank Parker
- Runner-up: (United States) Bill Talbert
- Score: 6–4, 3–6, 6–3, 6–3

Events
| Singles | men | women |
| Doubles | men | women |
| ← 1943 · | U.S. National Championships | · 1945 → |

Frank Parker defeated Bill Talbert 6–4, 3–6, 6–3, 6–3 in the final to win the men's singles tennis title at the 1944 U.S. National Championships.

== Seeds ==
The tournament used two lists of players for seeding the men's singles event; one for U.S. players or foreign players resident in the U.S., and one for foreign players not resident in the U.S. Frank Parker is the champion; others show the round in which they were eliminated.

U.S.

1. (Ecuador) Pancho Segura (semifinals)
2. (United States) Donald McNeill (semifinals)
3. (United States) Bill Talbert (finalist)
4. (United States) Frank Parker (champion)
5. (United States) Seymour Greenberg (quarterfinals)
6. (United States) Robert Falkenburg (quarterfinals)
7. (United States) Sidney Wood (first round)
8. (United States) Jack Jossi (second round)

Foreign

1. (Mexico) Armando Vega (first round)
2. (Mexico) Rolando Vega (second round)

== Draw ==
=== Key ===
- Q = Qualifier
- WC = Wild card
- LL = Lucky loser
- r = Retired

=== Finals ===
Quarterfinals
1 | (Ecuador) Pancho Segura | 6 | 6 | 6
(United States) Alexander Carver | 0 | 3 | 4
3 | (United States) Bill Talbert | 6 | 6 | 6
6 | (United States) Robert Falkenburg | 4 | 4 | 3
2 | (United States) Donald McNeill | 6 | 4 | 3 | 6 | 8
5 | (United States) Seymour Greenberg | 3 | 6 | 6 | 1 | 6
4 | (United States) Frank Parker | 6 | 6 | 6
(United States) Charles Oliver | 2 | 4 | 1

Semifinals
1 | (Ecuador) Pancho Segura | 6 | 3 | 0 | 8 | 3
3 | (United States) Bill Talbert | 3 | 6 | 6 | 6 | 6
2 | (United States) Donald McNeill | 4 | 6 | 2 | 2
4 | (United States) Frank Parker | 6 | 3 | 6 | 6

Final
3 | (United States) Bill Talbert | 4 | 6 | 3 | 3
4 | (United States) Frank Parker | 6 | 3 | 6 | 6

=== Earlier rounds ===
==== Section 1 ====
First round
1 | (United States) Segura | 6 | 6
(United States) Johnson | 2 | 3
(United States) Freeman | 6 | 6
(United States) Bickel | 2 | 1
8 | (United States) Jossi | 7 | 6
(United States) Cushingham | 5 | 4
(United States) Carver | 6 | 6 | 6
(United States) Cuninggim | 8 | 1 | 4
3 | (United States) Talbert | 6 | 6
(United States) Buzolich | 4 | 2
(United States) Ball | 6 | 6
(United States) Brown | 1 | 4
6 | (United States) Falkenburg | 5 | 6 | 6
(United States) Hunt | 7 | 2 | 4
10 | (Mexico) Vega | 6 | 2 | 6
(United States) Hart | 1 | 6 | 3

Second round
1 | (United States) Segura | 8 | 6
(United States) Freeman | 6 | 1
8 | (United States) Jossi | 1 | 6 | 6
(United States) Carver | 6 | 4 | 8
3 | (United States) Talbert | 7 | 4 | 6
(United States) Ball | 5 | 6 | 2
6 | (United States) Falkenburg | 6 | 6
10 | (Mexico) Vega | 3 | 0

Quarterfinals
1 | (United States) Segura | 6 | 6 | 6
(United States) Carver | 0 | 3 | 4
3 | (United States) Talbert | 6 | 6 | 6
6 | (United States) Falkenburg | 4 | 4 | 3

Semifinals
1 | (United States) Segura | 3 | 6 | 6 | 6 | 6
3 | (United States) Talbert | 6 | 3 | 0 | 8 | 3

==== Section 2 ====
First round
2 | (United States) McNeill | 6 | 10
(United States) Gillespie | 3 | 8
(United States) Hall | 0 | 6 | 6
(United States) Bender | 6 | 3 | 4
5 | (United States) Greenberg | 6 | 6
(United States) Savitt | 2 | 1
(United States) Ray | 6 | 6
(United States) Paul | 0 | 4
4 | (United States) Parker | 6 | 6
(United States) Thomas | 0 | 2
(United States) Seixas | 6 | 6
(United States) Watson | 3 | 3
(United States) Oliver | 6 | 6 | 6
7 | (United States) Wood | 3 | 8 | 1
(United States) McManus | 9 | 6
9 | (Mexico) Vega | 7 | 2

Second round
2 | (United States) McNeill | 7 | 6
(United States) Hall | 5 | 4
5 | (United States) Greenberg | 6 | 6
(United States) Ray | 1 | 0
4 | (United States) Parker | 6 | 6
(United States) Seixas | 1 | 4
(United States) Oliver | 0 | 6 | 6
(United States) McManus | 6 | 4 | 4

Quarterfinals
2 | (United States) McNeill | 6 | 4 | 3 | 6 | 8
5 | (United States) Greenberg | 3 | 6 | 6 | 1 | 6
4 | (United States) Parker | 6 | 6 | 6
(United States) Oliver | 2 | 4 | 1

Semifinals
2 | (United States) McNeill | 6 | 3 | 6 | 6
4 | (United States) Parker | 4 | 6 | 2 | 2
