= 1945 U.S. National Championships – Women's singles =

Women's singles
- 1945 U.S. National Championships

Final
- Champion: (United States) Sarah Palfrey Cooke
- Runner-up: (United States) Pauline Betz
- Score: 3–6, 8–6, 6–4

Details
- Draw: 32
- Seeds: 8

Events
Singles	men	women
Doubles	men	women
← 1944 ·	U.S. National Championships	· 1946 →

Second-seeded Sarah Palfrey Cooke defeated first-seeded Pauline Betz 3–6, 8–6, 6–4 in the final to win the women's singles tennis title at the 1945 U.S. National Championships.

== Seeds ==
The eight seeded U.S. players are listed below. Sarah Palfrey Cooke is the champion; others show in brackets the round in which they were eliminated.

1. (United States) Pauline Betz (finalist)
2. (United States) Sarah Palfrey Cooke (champion)
3. (United States) Margaret Osborne (quarterfinals)
4. (United States) Louise Brough (semifinals)
5. (United States) Patricia Todd (quarterfinals)
6. (United States) Mary Arnold (quarterfinals)
7. (United States) Dorothy Bundy (quarterfinals)
8. (United States) Doris Hart (semifinals)

One foreign player was seeded.

1. (Argentina) Mary Terán de Weiss (second round)

== Draw ==
=== Final eight ===
Quarterfinals
2	(United States) Sarah Palfrey Cooke	6	6
7	(United States) Dorothy Bundy	3	4
4	(United States) Louise Brough	6	6
5	(United States) Patricia Todd	2	4
1	(United States) Pauline Betz	0	6	6
6	(United States) Mary Arnold	6	4	4
3	(United States) Margaret Osborne	2	3
8	(United States) Doris Hart	6	6

Semifinals
2	(United States) Sarah Palfrey Cooke	6	6
4	(United States) Louise Brough	3	4
1	(United States) Pauline Betz	6	6
8	(United States) Doris Hart	3	2

Finals
2	(United States) Sarah Palfrey Cooke	3	8	6
1	(United States) Pauline Betz	6	6	4

Preceded by 1945 Wimbledon Championships – Women's singles	Grand Slam women's singles	Succeeded by 1946 Australian Championships – Women's singles
