= George Pero =

American tennis player (1916–1988)

George Pero (April 16, 1916 – March 23, 1988) was an American tennis player in the 1930s, 1940s and 1950s. He was born in Miami, Florida.

Pero played on the University of Miami tennis team that went unbeaten for three years between 1938 and 1940. While Pero was on the team, it lost to only two other colleges (Stanford and the University of California), and Pero himself did not lose a single match during his sophomore and junior years at Miami.

Pero enlisted in the Army Air Corp in the spring of 1942.

After World War II, he continued his tennis career, winning the Southern Championships and several state titles including Kentucky, Louisiana and Alabama. During his career, he had wins over future International Tennis Hall of Fame enshrinees Frank Parker, Sidney Wood and Don McNeill, and former NCAA singles champion Gardner Larned. At the Cincinnati Open, Pero reached the singles final in 1947 before falling to future International Tennis Hall of Fame enshrinee Bill Talbert. Pero also reached doubles finals in Cincinnati before and after the war. He teamed with Bill Hardie to reach the doubles final in 1937 (losing to John McDiarmid and Eugene McCauliff) and with Richard Hart to reach the doubles final in 1947 (losing to Talbert and Morey Lewis).

Pero was inducted into the Miami City Sports Hall of Fame.

== Personal life ==
Pero and his wife had at least one child, a daughter named Allegra, before divorcing in the early 1970s. He taught his daughter how to play tennis and she later received All-American status twice. They won the Florida Tennis Association's Father-Daughter state championship together in 1973. Allegra was previously married to Billy Cesare, an American football player with the Tampa Bay Buccaneers.

=== Legacy ===
In April 1995, the first annual George Pero Memorial Family Tennis Championship was held in Lutz, Florida.
