= 1944 U.S. National Championships – Women's singles =

Women's singles
- 1944 U.S. National Championships

Final
- Champion: (United States) Pauline Betz
- Runner-up: (United States) Margaret Osborne
- Score: 6–3, 8–6

Details
- Draw: 32
- Seeds: 8

Events
Singles	men	women
Doubles	men	women
← 1943 ·	U.S. National Championships	· 1945 →

First-seeded and reigning champion Pauline Betz defeated second-seeded Margaret Osborne 6–3, 8–6 in the final to win the women's singles tennis title at the 1944 U.S. National Championships. The tournament was played on outdoor grass courts and held from August 30 through September 4, 1944 at the West Side Tennis Club in Forest Hills, Queens, New York.

The draw consisted of 32 players of which eight were seeded.

== Seeds ==
The eight seeded U.S. players are listed below. Pauline Betz is the champion; others show in brackets the round in which they were eliminated.

1. (United States) Pauline Betz (champion)
2. (United States) Margaret Osborne (finalist)
3. (United States) Louise Brough (semifinals)
4. (United States) Dorothy Bundy (semifinals)
5. (United States) Mary Arnold (quarterfinals)
6. (United States) Doris Hart (quarterfinals)
7. (United States) Virginia Kovacs (quarterfinals)
8. (United States) Patricia Todd (second round)

== Draw ==
=== Final eight ===
Quarterfinals
1	(United States) Pauline Betz	6	6	6
7	(United States) Virginia Kovacs	4	8	4
3	(United States) Louise Brough	3	6	8
5	(United States) Mary Arnold	6	3	6
2	(United States) Margaret Osborne	6	6
(United States) Shirley Fry	3	1
4	(United States) Dorothy Bundy	5	8	6
6	(United States) Doris Hart	7	6	4

Semifinals
1	(United States) Pauline Betz	6	6
3	(United States) Louise Brough	2	3
2	(United States) Margaret Osborne	4	6	6
4	(United States) Dorothy Bundy	6	4	0

Finals
1	(United States) Pauline Betz	6	8
2	(United States) Margaret Osborne	3	6
