= Duncan Thompson =

Australian rugby league footballer (1895–1980)

Duncan Thompson MBE
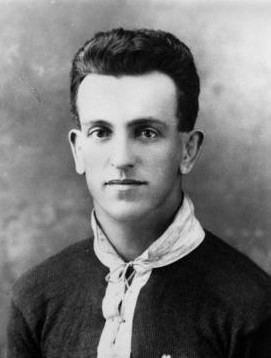
- Thompson in 1925

Personal information
- Full name: Duncan Fulton Thompson
- Born: 14 March 1895 Warwick, Queensland, Australia
- Died: 17 May 1980 (aged 85) Auchenflower, Queensland, Australia

Playing information
- Height: 171 cm (5 ft 7 in)
- Weight: 72 kg (11 st 5 lb)
- Position: Halfback
Club
Years	Team	Pld	T	G	FG	P
1911–15	St.Paul's (Ipswich)
1915	Wests (Newcastle)
1916	North Sydney	13	1	0	0	3
1919	Starlights (Ipswich)
1920–23	North Sydney	46	11	46	0	125
1924–25	Valleys (Toowoomba)
	Total	59	12	46	0	128
Representative
Years	Team	Pld	T	G	FG	P
1915–25	Queensland	11	1	18	0	38
1920–24	Australia	9	2	4	0	11
1921–22	New South Wales	3	2	0	0	6
1922–23	Metropolis	3	2	1	0	8

Coaching information
Club
Years	Team	Gms	W	D	L	W%
195?–??	Toowoomba
Representative
Years	Team	Gms	W	D	L	W%
1953	Queensland	0	0	0	0

Duncan Fulton Thompson MBE (14 March 1895 – 17 May 1980) was an Australian veteran of both World War I and World War II and a rugby league footballer, coach and administrator. He was wounded on active service in World War I and has been named amongst the nation's finest footballers of the 20th century, and is regarded as the father of modern coaching. He was appointed a Member of the Order of the British Empire (MBE) in the 1960 New Year Honours "for services to the community in the field of Sport."

== Early life ==
Born in Warwick, Queensland, on 14 March 1895, Thompson would go on to become a banker and skillful rugby league halfback. He commenced his club career in the Queensland town of Ipswich, and first represented for Queensland in 1915. His brother Colin Thompson also played representative rugby league for Queensland in the 1920s.

== First World War ==
Thompson moved to Sydney where he played for Norths before enlisting in the First Australian Imperial Force in 1916 during World War I. He left Sydney in 1917 on HMAS Ayrshire with the 49th Battalion (Queensland) within 13th Brigade of the Australian 4th Division, and saw active service in Belgium and France. In April 1918 during the German spring offensive he was shot through the chest at Dernancourt on the Ancre River but survived. He was told he would not play sport again and carried a bullet fragment in his body for the rest of his life. He was discharged after demobilisation in January 1919.

== Continued playing career ==
After returning to Australia in 1919 Thompson joined the Commonwealth Bank and re-commenced his football career. He was selected to go on the 1919 Kangaroo tour of New Zealand, the first Australian full Test representative side to cross the Tasman. With the world still recovering from World War I and in the midst of the deadly Spanish flu pandemic, the side could only find passage to New Zealand on a cockroach and rat-infested cargo ship out of Newcastle harbour. Half-way across the Tasman, bites from the ship-bred vermin led to Thompson and "Chook" Fraser falling victim to blood-poisoned legs.

During the 1920 Great Britain Lions tour Thompson was selected to play for Australia in the halves in the 2ng and 3rd Ashes Test matches in Sydney.

Thompson seated seventh from left with the 1921–22 Kangaroos

Thompson won premierships with Norths in 1921 and along with other North Sydney stars Harold Horder and Cec Blinkhorn he was selected to go on the 1921–22 Kangaroo tour of Great Britain, playing in all three Tests and twenty-three tour matches, topping 100 points on the overall tour with 49 goals. He also took Norths to victory in the 1922 NSWRFL season's premiership final, captaining the side.

Thompson's departure from Sydney was bitter following a suspension on a kicking charge which he steadfastly denied. Returning to Queensland, he captained the Toowoomba team in 1924 and 1925, alongside Herb Steinohrt and Tom Gorman. This renowned Toowoomba side beat all comers, including Sydney premiers Souths, Brisbane, Ipswich and visiting representative sides, including New South Wales, Victoria, Great Britain and New Zealand. His international representative career closed in 1924 with two Test appearances in the Ashes series against the touring British Lions.

== Post playing and WWII ==
A Toowoomba champion tennis player and Queensland state tennis representative, Thompson played in the 1931 Australian Championships – Men's doubles and in the men's doubles at the 1931 New South Wales Open. He was also an accomplished cricketer, fine golfer and lawn bowler. He served again for his country in the AIF in World War II as an amenities officer at Townsville and in Papua New Guinea.

Thompson served as an administrator for the Queensland Rugby League and also coached the Toowoomba Clydesdales to six victories in the Bulimba Cup in the 1950s. During the 1950 and 1954 Great Britain Lions tours Hall was coach of the Toowoomba side that hosted matches against Great Britain. He was a state and national selector in the 1950s and 1960s.

Thompson died in Auchenflower, Queensland on 17 May 1980.

== Accolades ==
In 1929 the Duncan Thompson Stand at the North Sydney Oval was named after him as well as the main grandstand at Clive Berghofer Stadium in Toowoomba. In 1960 Thompson was honoured as a Member (civil) of the Order of the British Empire for his contribution to sport.

In 2005 he was inducted into the Australian Rugby League Hall of Fame and in August 2006 was named at halfback in the North Sydney Bears' Team of the Century. In February 2008, Thompson was named in the list of Australia's 100 Greatest Players (1908–2007) which was commissioned by the NRL and ARL to celebrate the code's centenary year in Australia. In June 2008, he was chosen in the Queensland Rugby League's Team of the Century on interchange bench. In 2008, rugby league in Australia's centenary year, Thompson was named as half-back and coach of the Toowoomba and South West Team of the Century.

Sporting positions
Preceded by Fred Gilbert; 1951	Coach Queensland; 1953	Succeeded by Clive Churchill; 1959
