= Pride Morey Lewis =

American tennis player

- Country (sports): United States
- Born: 1919 Tyler, Texas, U.S.
- Died: 4 June 1977 (aged 57) Laredo, Texas, U.S.
- Retired: 1947

Singles
- Career titles: 9

Grand Slam singles results
- US Open: 3R (1939)

Pride Morey Lewis (1919 - 4 June 1977) was an American tennis player.

== Career ==
Morey Lewis began his career in the mid 1930s. In 1937 he won the Louisiana State championships. In 1938 he won the Minnesota State singles title beating Don Leavens in the final. In 1939 Morey Lewis won the Canadian championships beating Robert Madden in straight sets in the final. "Chances are that Morey Lewis, a husky character from Texarkana, Texas will never take championship tennis seriously enough to become a world-beater. But for a while this 20-year-old collegian seems destined to mix a lot of first-rate tournament play with a personality that will stamp him as a crowd-pleaser everywhere". The final "put a last dramatic touch on the Texan's debated entry and one-sided march through the tournament". Lewis won the California State title in 1945 beating Harry Buttermeier in the final. Lewis won his second Canadian championships title in 1946 beating Don McDiarmid in the final. Lewis' wife Baba won the women's singles title.
