= Joe Hunt =

American tennis player (1919–1945)

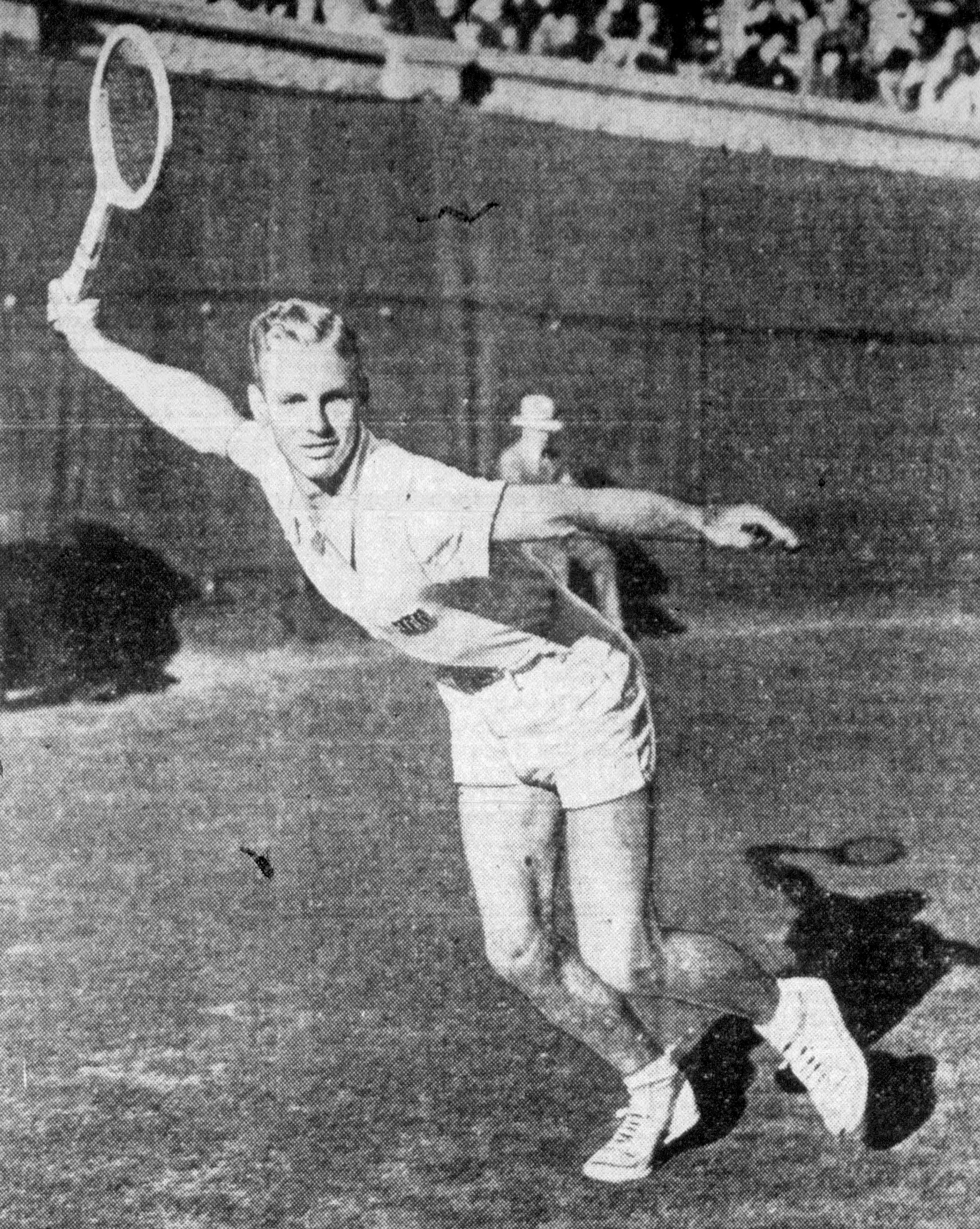
- Full name: Joseph Raphael Hunt
- Country (sports): United States
- Born: February 17, 1919; San Francisco, California, U.S.
- Died: February 2, 1945 (aged 25); Daytona Beach, Florida, U.S
- Turned pro: 1935 (amateur tour)
- Retired: 1945 (due to death)
- Plays: Right-handed (one-handed backhand)
- Int. Tennis HoF: 1966 (member page)

Singles

Grand Slam singles results
- US Open: W (1943)

Team competitions
- Davis Cup: F (1939^{Ch})

Joseph Raphael Hunt (February 17, 1919 – February 2, 1945) was an American tennis player of the late 1930s and early 1940s from Southern California. He was the number one ranked American in 1943 and won the US singles championship in his final match. He died off the coast of Florida in an airplane crash during World War II. To date he is the only man to win the U.S. boys' (15 and under), junior (18 and under), collegiate, and men's singles championship.

== Tennis career ==
A graduate of Fairfax High School in Los Angeles, Hunt played college tennis at the University of Southern California as a freshman, and he went undefeated in singles and doubles play while in college during 1938, including the Ojai Tennis Tournament. Hunt was very athletic, and he played football for a while. After enlisting, he attended the United States Naval Academy and joined the Navy football team as a running back during the 1940 season. He was given the game ball for the 1940 Army–Navy Game. Hunt made the semifinals at the 1939 and 1940 United States singles championships. During the 1940 quarterfinals against Frank Kovacs, he staged a sit-down strike during the match after he complained to the referee about Kovacs' antics and was unhappy with the referee's lack of response. Early in their third set, Kovacs began engaging in prolonged antics with the stadium gallery. When the umpire would not stop Kovacs or quiet the crowd, Hunt sat down on his baseline and did not acknowledge several of Kovacs' serves, allowing them to fly by. Kovacs then sat down on his baseline, and the two players sat for up to five minutes while the crowd alternately jeered and cheered. When order was finally restored, Hunt went on to win the match in straight sets. Hunt represented the United States in the 1939 International Lawn Tennis Challenge (now Davis Cup) challenge round against Australia. He played the doubles match partnering Jack Kramer which they lost to John Bromwich and Adrian Quist.

Hunt married Jacque Carolyn Virgil in 1942.

In September 1943, he won the United States singles championship at Forest Hills while lying on the ground. On match point, Hunt collapsed with leg cramps while his opponent, Jack Kramer, who due to food poisoning had lost 19 pounds during tournament, hit a return that barely went long. Had it been in, most observers at the time felt that Kramer would have eventually won the match against Hunt. Hunt was unable to obtain leave from the Navy in 1944 in order to defend his title.

He was the U.S. no. 1 in 1943 and world no. 10 in 1939 by Gordon Lowe.

Hunt was inducted into the International Tennis Hall of Fame in 1966.

Pancho Segura, who had lost to Kramer in the semifinals, described Hunt as "a strong guy, big serve and volley, and took to grass, coming from the Southern California concrete". In a 2014 interview Segura added: "He was a very good-looking man with a body like Charles Atlas. He drew women to his matches. He would have been good for tennis. He was a credit to the game."

== Grand Slam finals ==
=== Singles: 1 (1 title) ===
Result	Year	Championship	Surface	Opponent	Score
Win	1943	U.S. National Championships	Grass	(United States) Jack Kramer	6–3, 6–8, 10–8, 6–0

== Grand Slam tournament performance timeline ==
Key
W	F	SF	QF	#R	RR	Q#	DNQ	A	NH

(W) winner; (F) finalist; (SF) semifinalist; (QF) quarterfinalist; (#R) rounds 4, 3, 2, 1; (RR) round-robin stage; (Q#) qualification round; (DNQ) did not qualify; (A) absent; (NH) not held; (SR) strike rate (events won / competed); (W–L) win–loss record.

Tournament	1936	1937	1938	1939	1940	1941	1942	1943
Grand Slam tournaments
Australian Open	A	A	A	A	A	NH	NH	NH
French Open	A	A	A	A	NH	NH	NH	NH
Wimbledon	A	A	A	A	NH	NH	NH	NH
US Open	3R	QF	QF	SF	SF	A	A	W

== Military service and death ==
Hunt was a graduate from the Naval Academy at Annapolis. He became a lieutenant in the U.S. Navy during World War II and served a year on a destroyer in the Pacific and a year in the Atlantic. On February 2, 1945, close to his 26th birthday, Hunt was killed on a routine gunnery training mission off Daytona Beach, Florida when the fighter airplane that he was piloting, a Grumman Hellcat, went into a spin at an altitude of 10,000 feet from which he failed to recover.
