= 1943 U.S. National Championships – Women's singles =

Women's singles
- 1943 U.S. National Championships

Final
- Champion: (United States) Pauline Betz
- Runner-up: (United States) Louise Brough
- Score: 6–3, 5–7, 6–3

Details
- Draw: 32
- Seeds: 8

Events
Singles	men	women
Doubles	men	women
← 1942 ·	U.S. National Championships	· 1944 →

First-seeded and reigning champion Pauline Betz defeated second-seeded Louise Brough 6–3, 5–7, 6–3 in the final to win the women's singles tennis title at the 1943 U.S. National Championships. The tournament was played on outdoor grass courts and held from September 1 through September 4, 1943 at the West Side Tennis Club in Forest Hills, Queens, New York.

The draw consisted of 32 players of which eight were seeded.

== Seeds ==
The eight seeded U.S. players are listed below. Pauline Betz is the champion; others show in brackets the round in which they were eliminated.

1. (United States) Pauline Betz (champion)
2. (United States) Louise Brough (finalist)
3. (United States) Margaret Osborne (quarterfinals)
4. (United States) Doris Hart (semifinals)
5. (United States) Sarah Palfrey Cooke (quarterfinals)
6. (United States) Helen Bernhard (second round)
7. (United States) Dorothy Bundy (semifinals)
8. (United States) Mary Arnold (quarterfinals)

== Draw ==
=== Final eight ===
Quarterfinals
1	(United States) Pauline Betz	6	6
(United States) Dorothy Head	0	1
4	(United States) Doris Hart	6	6
5	(United States) Sarah Palfrey Cooke	1	3
2	(United States) Louise Brough	3	6	7
8	(United States) Mary Arnold	6	3	5
3	(United States) Margaret Osborne	3	6	5
7	(United States) Dorothy Bundy	6	3	7

Semifinals
1	(United States) Pauline Betz	9	2	6
4	(United States) Doris Hart	7	6	1
2	(United States) Louise Brough	6	7
7	(United States) Dorothy Bundy	4	5

Finals
1	(United States) Pauline Betz	6	5	6
2	(United States) Louise Brough	3	7	3
