= 1943 U.S. National Championships – Men's singles =

Men's singles
- 1943 U.S. National Championships

Final
- Champion: (United States) Joseph Hunt
- Runner-up: (United States) Jack Kramer
- Score: 6–3, 6–8, 10–8, 6–0

Events
Singles	men	women		boys	girls
Doubles	men	women	mixed	boys	girls
← 1942 ·	U.S. National Championships	· 1944 →

Joseph Hunt defeated Jack Kramer 6–3, 6–8, 10–8, 6–0 in the final to win the men's singles tennis title at the 1943 U.S. National Championships.

== Draw ==
=== Key ===
- Q = Qualifier
- WC = Wild card
- LL = Lucky loser
- r = Retired

=== Finals ===
Quarterfinals
(Ecuador) Pancho Segura	6	6	6
(United States) Seymour Greenberg	2	4	1
(United States) Jack Kramer	6	6	6
(United States) Jack Tuero	1	2	4
(United States) Frank Parker	6	2	3
(United States) Joseph Hunt	8	6	6
(United States) Bill Talbert	6	4	8	6
(United States) Elwood Cooke	1	6	6	4

Semifinals
(Ecuador) Pancho Segura	6	4	5	3
(United States) Jack Kramer	2	6	7	6
(United States) Joseph Hunt	3	6	6	6
(United States) Bill Talbert	6	4	2	4

Final
(United States) Jack Kramer	3	8	8	0
(United States) Joseph Hunt	6	6	10	6

=== Earlier rounds ===
==== Section 1 ====
First round
(Ecuador) Segura	6	6
(United States) Bender	3	3
(United States) Grant	7	6
(United States) Sisson	5	2
(United States) Greenberg	2	6	6
(United States) Falkenburg	6	2	0
(United States) Oliver	6	0	6
(Czechoslovakia) Hecht	4	6	1
(United States) Kramer	6	6
(United States) Gifford	1	1
(United States) Falkenburg	6	6
(United States) Shea	3	4
(United States) Tuero
(United States) Wood	w/o
(United States) Garrett	6	6
(United States) Kring	1	2

Second round
(Ecuador) Segura	6	6
(United States) Grant	3	1
(United States) Greenberg	6	6
(United States) Oliver	4	3
(United States) Kramer	6	6
(United States) Falkenburg	1	2
(United States) Tuero	3	6	6
(United States) Garrett	6	4	4

Quarterfinals
(Ecuador) Segura	6	6	6
(United States) Greenberg	2	4	1
(United States) Kramer	6	6	6
(United States) Tuero	1	2	4

Semifinals
(Ecuador) Segura	2	6	7	6
(United States) Kramer	6	4	5	3

==== Section 2 ====
First round
(United States) Parker	6	6
(United States) Cushingham	2	3
(United States) Freeman	6	6
(United States) Odman	3	1
(United States) Hunt	6	6
(United States) Ager	4	4
(United States) Brink	6	6
(United States) Evert	1	1
(United States) Talbert	6	6
(United Kingdom) Hare	0	0
(United States) Ball
(United States) Hunt	w/o
(United States) Cooke	6	6
(United States) Ray	0	1
(United States) Everett	6	6
(United States) Paul	1	2

Second round
(United States) Parker	6	6
(United States) Freeman	0	4
(United States) Hunt	6	6
(United States) Brink	1	0
(United States) Talbert	6	6
(United States) Ball	0	1
(United States) Cooke	6	6
(United States) Everett	2	2

Quarterfinals
(United States) Parker	8	6	6
(United States) Hunt	6	2	3
(United States) Talbert	6	4	8	6
(United States) Cooke	1	6	6	4

Semifinals
(United States) Hunt	3	6	6	6
(United States) Talbert	6	4	2	4
