= Chauncey Steele Jr. =

American tennis player (1914–1988)

- Country (sports): United States
- Born: October 26, 1914; New Rochelle, New York
- Died: May 14, 1988 (aged 73); Chestnut Hill, Massachusetts

Singles

Grand Slam singles results
- US Open: 3R (1937, 1939)

Chauncey Depew Steele Jr. (October 26, 1914 – May 14, 1988) was a tennis player from the United States. Steele made 15 singles appearances in the U.S. National Championships during his career. Steele enjoyed golf and tennis at the Briarcliff Lodge, where his father Chauncey Depew Steele served as manager from 1923 to 1933.

His son, Chauncey Steele III, would also compete in the U.S. National Championships, as well as Wimbledon.
