= Frank Guernsey (tennis) =

American tennis player

- Full name: Frank David Guernsey
- Country (sports): United States
- Born: January 19, 1917 Orlando, Florida, US
- Died: March 20, 2008 (aged 91) The Woodlands, Texas, US

Singles

Grand Slam singles results
- US Open: 4R (1939)

Doubles

Grand Slam doubles results
- US Open: F (1946)

Frank David Guernsey Jr. (January 19, 1917 – March 20, 2008) was an American tennis player. He was a finalist at the 1946 US Open in the Men's Doubles where along with Don McNeill he lost 3–6, 6–4, 2–6, 6–3, 20–18 to William Talbert and Gardnar Mulloy.

Frank Guernsey was born on 19 January 1917, in Orlando, Florida, to Frank Drummond Guernsey and Anita McChesney Guernsey.

In 1938 and 1939 Guernsey won the NCAA Men's Tennis Championship singles title playing for Rice University. In 1939 he won the singles title at the River Oaks Invitational Tournament, a reasonably prestigious tournament at the time. In 1941 he and Don McNeil won the National Indoor Doubles Championship, defeating Jack Kramer and Bobby Riggs in the final. Also in 1941, he partnered with Bobby Riggs to win the River Oaks Doubles Championship, beating Jack Kramer and Ted Schroeder in the final. He was enlisted in the Rice University Hall of Fame in 1941. In 1946 he and Don McNeil successfully defended their National Indoor Doubles Championship, this time defeating Pancho Segura and Alejo Russell in the final.

In April 1941 Guernsey signed up for the United States Army Air Force (USAAF) and was sent to California for fighter pilot training. In 1942 he was dispatched to Alaska and took part in the Aleutian Campaign. In 1943 he trained Air Force pilots in Florida. In 1944 Guernsey was transferred to the 8th Air Force in England where he flew support missions for bombing campaigns and was credited with shooting down two German enemy planes. He received the Distinguished Flying Cross and Air Medal with five oak leaf clusters. During his service he flew P-39, P-40, and P-47 fighter planes.

In 1989 he was inducted into the Men's Collegiate Tennis Hall of Fame.

== Grand Slam finals ==
=== Doubles (1 runner-up) ===
| Result | Year | Championship | Surface | Partner | Opponents | Score |
|---|---|---|---|---|---|---|
| Loss | 1946 | U.S. National Championships | Grass | (United States) Don McNeill | (United States) Gardnar Mulloy (United States) Bill Talbert | 6–3, 4–6, 6–2, 3–6, 18–20 |
