= Charles Donohoe =

Australian tennis player

- Country (sports): Australia
- Born: 1905
- Died: died 20th century

Singles
- Career record: 0
- Career titles: 0

Doubles
- Career record: 1
- Career titles: 0

Grand Slam doubles results
- Australian Open: W (1931)

Charles Donohoe (born 1905-date of death unknown) was an Australian professional tennis player. He won the 1931 Australian Open Tennis in men's doubles (with Roy Dunlop).

== Grand Slam finals ==
=== Doubles (1 title) ===
Result	Year	Tournament	Surface	Partner	Opponents	Score
Winner	1931	Australian Championships	Grass	(Australia) Roy Dunlop	(Australia) Jack Crawford (Australia) Harry Hopman	8–6, 6–2, 5–7, 7–9, 6–4
