= Gwen Utz =

Australian tennis player

Gwen Utz (1900–1979) was an Australian tennis player.

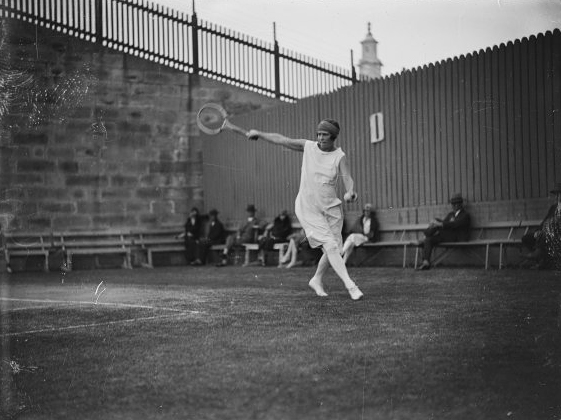
Gwen Utz (circa 1925) in New South Wales.

== Life ==
Gwendoline M Chiplin was born in 1900 in New South Wales. She married Harold Utz in 1920. Gwen Utz died in 1979.

== Grand slam finals ==
Gwen Utz reached the final of women's doubles in the inaugural Australian Championship with Floris St. George and they lost to Esna Boyd and Marjorie Mountain 1–6, 6–4, 7–5. She also reached the semifinal in Women's singles in the same year. Gwen Utz reached the final of women's doubles in the Australian Championship once again in 1931, this time with Nell Lloyd and they lost to Daphne Akhurst Cozens and Louise Bickerton 6–0, 6–4.
