= List of sports rivalries =

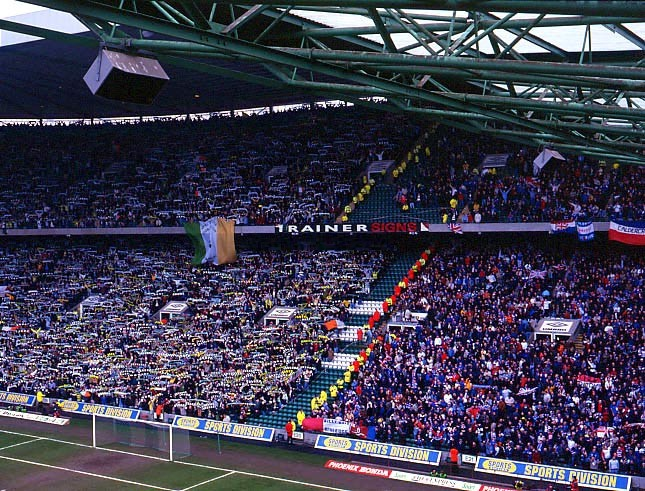
Fans separated at an Old Firm derby in Glasgow, Scotland

A sports rivalry is intense competition between athletic teams or athletes, affecting participants, management, and supporters all to varying degrees.

One of the first known sports rivalries occurred in the Roman Empire between the Blues and the Greens, and the minor teams of the Reds and Whites, each of which were chariot racing clubs competing at the Hippodrome in Constantinople. The rivalry took on political tones as well, coming close to deposing the Roman Emperor Justinian in 532 AD in a riot and the suppression of the riot killed tens of thousands of people.

Owners have been known to encourage rivalries as they tend to improve game attendance and television ratings for rivalry matches. Clubs can reduce fan aggression surrounding rivalry games by acknowledging rather than downplaying the conflict because the rivalry is an integral part of fan identity.

Games between two rivals that are based in areas of close geographical proximity are often known as a local derby, or simply just a derby (UK: /ˈdɑːbi/ DAH-bee, US: /ˈdɜːrbi/ DUR-bee); a sporting event between two teams from the same town, city or region. In modern usage the term is usually connected with association football and the media and supporters will often refer to this fixture as "Derby Day". However, and unsurprisingly, the first recorded use of the term was to refer to major provincial horse races from a time when the Epsom Derby, was not only England's major sporting event but also a huge social occasion.

For example, the Western Times, 2 June 1860, refers to a race meeting at Haldon, Exeter, as their "local Derby Day." The Hull Packet, 31 May 1861, calls the Beverley, Hull and East Riding Races "our local Derby." It would appear that the term was already in use elsewhere in the world – The Ballarat Star (Victoria, Australia), 6 December 1860 edition, mentions that races in Dowling Forest were "the local Derby day."

The metaphor evidently seeped into common usage, as non-racing events also earned the epithet. An athletic club fete in Croydon (Norwood News, 22 May 1869), a rowing regatta at Bathgate, Scotland (Lothian Courier, 26 September 1874) and even a hotly contested local government election (Croydon Advertiser, 27 February 1875) were all described as a local Derby.

As club football (Rugby and Association codes) gained popularity in the 1870s and 1880s the phrase migrated to that pastime. The Preston Herald of 14 March 1883 said of a fixture between Low Moor and Clitheroe that "when it becomes known that the clubs are likely to meet, popular feeling runs high – so high, in fact, that the occasional is recognised as the local Derby day".

The Epsom Derby being an annual event, early usage tended to refer only to the biggest occasion of the year in a certain location – the Widnes Weekly News (16 March 1889) was moved to describe a match between Widnes FC and the touring New Zealand Native touring rugby team as "the great day of the season at Widnes – the local Derby." However, in football terms, the emphasis in the phrase had already shifted from the Derby aspect (a red letter day in the sporting or social calendar) to the local element – any football match involving nearby clubs, no matter how relatively unimportant the fixture might otherwise be. Hence the Burnley Express (15 December 1888) felt able to report that "for three weeks in succession the Langroyd team will be engaged in local "Derbies." First of all, Union Star; then Nelson, at Seed Hill; and afterwards Brierfield at Colne."

In rugby football, an early example of the term for that code appears in the Wigan Observer of 11 December 1885 which noted that "the local "Derby" in the football circles of Pemberton was brought off on Saturday last, when Highfield and Pemberton met."

Since at least as early as 1840 'derby' has been used as a noun in English to denote any kind of sporting contest. Other names for derbies include Clásicos in certain parts of the world and crosstown rivalries in the United States.

The intensity of the rivalry can range anywhere from a light hearted banter to serious violence. A rivalry that gets out of control can lead to fighting, hooliganism, rioting and some instances with career-ending and even fatal consequences. In the "Football War", along with other factors, it was suggested to have been the tipping point in leading to military conflicts.

Rivalries do not always stem from the sharing of an area. Hostilities can occur for different reasons, such as in the case of El Clásico with tensions between fans with a background of political differences. Frequent meetings in important games between teams can also lead to unpleasantries.

== International rivalries ==
- Australia–England sports rivalries
- India–Pakistan sports rivalries
- Australia–New Zealand sports rivalries
- Australia–United States sports rivalries
- Canada–United States sports rivalries
- Japan–South Korea sports rivalries
- Afghanistan–Pakistan sports rivalries

== Athletics ==
=== Individual ===
1st party	2nd party	Discipline(s)	Timespan	Article	Source
(United Kingdom) Steve Ovett	(United Kingdom) Sebastian Coe	Middle-distance running	1978–1986		
(Jamaica) Usain Bolt	(United States) Tyson Gay	Sprinting	2005–2012		
(Jamaica) Asafa Powell	(United States) Tyson Gay	Sprinting	2006–2016		
(Cuba) Dayron Robles	(China) Liu Xiang	Hurdling	2007–2011		
(United States) Joan Benoit	(Norway) Grete Waitz	Marathon	—	—	
(Jamaica) Usain Bolt	(United States) Justin Gatlin	Sprinting	2012–2017		
(Jamaica) Usain Bolt	(Jamaica) Yohan Blake	Sprinting	2012		
(Canada) Ben Johnson	(United States) Carl Lewis	Sprinting	1984–1988		
(Jamaica) Veronica Campbell-Brown	(United States) Allyson Felix	100 metres & 200 metres	2004–2016		
(Italy) Ondina Valla	(Italy) Claudia Testoni	Sprinting	1932–1940	Testoni–Valla rivalry	
(Italy) Luigi Facelli	(United Kingdom) David Burghley	Hurdling	1927–1933		
(Grenada) Kirani James	(United States) LaShawn Merritt	Sprinting	2011–2017		
(Kenya) Paul Tergat	(Ethiopia) Haile Gebrselassie	Marathon	1995–2000		
(Kenya) Eliud Kipchoge	(Ethiopia) Kenenisa Bekele	Marathon	2012–present		
(United Kingdom) Daley Thompson	(West Germany) Jürgen Hingsen	Decathlon	–		
(Serbia) Ivana Španović	(Russia) Darya Klishina	Long jump	2007–present		
(Canada) Donovan Bailey	(United States) Michael Johnson	Sprinting	1996–1997	Bailey–Johnson 150-metre race	
(United Kingdom) Tessa Sanderson	(United Kingdom) Fatima Whitbread	Javelin	1978–1992		
(India) P. T. Usha	(Philippines) Lydia de Vega	Sprinting	1980s		
(Norway) Jakob Ingebrigtsen	(United Kingdom) Josh Kerr	Middle-distance running	2023–present		
(Jamaica) Shelly-Ann Fraser-Pryce	(Jamaica) Elaine Thompson-Herah	Sprinting	2015–present		

=== Team ===
1st party	2nd party	Discipline(s)	Timespan	Article	Source
Finland	Sweden	Multi-discipline	1925–present	Finland–Sweden Athletics International	
Jamaica	United States	Sprinting	1960s—present		
Kenya	Ethiopia	Long-distance running	1968–present		

== Badminton ==
=== Individuals ===
1st party	2nd party	Timespan	Article	Source
(Indonesia) Susi Susanti	(South Korea) Bang Soo-hyun	1992–1996		
(Malaysia) Lee Chong Wei	(China) Lin Dan	2004–2020	Lee–Lin rivalry	

=== International ===
1st party	2nd party	Timespan	Article	Source
Indonesia	China	1990s–present		

== Bandy ==
In Swedish bandy, derby games are often played on Saint Stephen's Day.

== Baseball ==
=== International ===
- Japan–South Korea baseball rivalry
- El Clásico del Clasico (Baseball)
- Dominican Republic–Venezuela baseball rivalry

=== Dominican Republic ===
==== Dominican Professional Baseball League ====
- Águilas Cibaeñas from Santiago de los Caballeros vs. Tigres del Licey from Santo Domingo on a game named “El Clásico Dominicano.”
- Santo Domingo rivals: Leones del Escogido vs. Tigres del Licey

=== Japan ===
==== Nippon Professional Baseball ====
===== Central League =====
- Yomiuri Giants vs. Hanshin Tigers, named "The Classic Series" (伝統の一戦 in Japanese).
- Yomiuri Giants vs. Tokyo Yakult Swallows, named "Tokyo Series".
- Yomiuri Giants vs. Chunichi Dragons

===== Interleague =====
- Hanshin Tigers vs. Orix Buffaloes, named "Kansai Derby".

=== South Korea ===
==== KBO League ====
- KIA Tigers vs. Samsung Lions on a game named "88 Expressway Series".
- Doosan Bears vs. LG Twins on a game named "Jamsil Series".
- Lotte Giants vs. NC Dinos on a game named "Nakdonggang Derby".
- Kiwoom Heroes vs. Doosan Bears or LG Twins on a game named "Seoul Series".

=== Taiwan ===
==== Chinese Professional Baseball League ====
- CTBC Brothers vs. Wei Chuan Dragons on a game named "Dragon–Elephant Derby" (龍象大戰 in Chinese).
- CTBC Brothers vs. Fubon Guardians on a game named "Bank holding Derby" (金控大戰 in Chinese).

=== Mexico ===
==== Mexican Baseball League ====
- Diablos Rojos del México (Mexico City Red Devils) vs. Tigres de Quintana Roo (Tigers) on a game named "Civil War Derby" ("Guerra Civil" in Spanish).
- Saraperos de Saltillo (Saltillo Sarapemakers) vs. Vaqueros Laguna (Torreon Lagoon Cowboys) on a game named "Coahuila's Metropolitan Derby" ("Clásico metropolitano de Coahuila" in Spanish).
- Pericos de Puebla (Puebla Parrots) vs. Rojos del Águila de Veracruz (Veracruz Red Eagles) on a game named "Center rivalry" ("Rivalidad del centro" in Spanish).
- Diablos Rojos del México (Mexico City Red Devils) vs. Péricos de Puebla (Puebla Parrots) on a game named "Anahuac Derby" ("Clásico de Ánahuac" in Spanish).
- Saraperos de Saltillo (Saltillo Sarapemakers) vs. Sultanes de Monterrey (Monterrey Sultans) on a game named "North of Mexico Derby" ("Clásico del Norte" in Spanish).

==== Mexican Pacific League ====
- Naranjeros de Hermosillo (Hermosillo Orange Growers) vs. Tomateros de Culiacán (Culiacan Tomato Growers) on a game named "Derby of the Pacific Coast" ("Clásico del Pacífico" in Spanish).
- Charros de Jalisco (Jalisco Charros) vs. Venados de Mazatlán (Mazatlan Deers) on a game named "Rivalry of the west" ("Rivalidad de Occidente" in Spanish).

=== United States/Canada ===
==== Minor League Baseball ====
- Mercer Cup: Bluefield Blue Jays vs. Princeton Rays

=== Venezuela ===
==== Venezuelan Professional Baseball League ====
- Leones del Caracas (Caracas Lions) vs. Navegantes del Magallanes (Magellan Navigators)
- Leones del Caracas (Caracas Lions) vs. Tiburones de La Guaira (La Guaira Sharks)

=== Cuba ===
==== Cuban National Series ====
- Industriales from La Havana vs. Avispas from Santiago de Cuba nicknamed "El Clásico de la Pelota Cubana."

== Basketball ==
=== Argentina ===
- Ferro Carril Oeste vs Atenas
- San Lorenzo vs Ferro Carril Oeste
- San Lorenzo vs Boca Juniors
- G.E.P.U. vs Atenas
- Clásico porteño: Obras vs Ferro Carril Oeste
- Argentinian derby: Peñarol vs Quilmes
- Córdoba Derby: Atenas vs Instituto
- San Nicolás derby: Belgrano vs Regatas
- Bahía Blanca derby: Estudiantes (BB) vs Olimpo
- Corrientes derby: Regatas Corrientes vs San Martín
- Santiago del Estero derby: Club Ciclista Olímpico vs Quimsa
- Sunchales derby: Libertad vs Unión de Sunchales
- Santa Fe derby: Colón vs Unión
  - This is also a football rivalry.
- General Pico derby: Independiente vs Pico Football Club
- La Pampa derby: All Boys (SR) vs Estudiantes (SR)
- Paraná derby: Atlético Echagüe vs Juventud Sionista
- Firmat derby: Argentino (F) vs Firmat Foot Ball Club
- Junín derby: Argentino de Junín vs Club Ciclista Juninense
- Tres Arroyos derby: Huracán de Tres Arroyos vs Costa Sud
- Comodoro Rivadavia derby: Gimnasia (CR) vs Federación Deportiva
- Pergamino derby: Gimnasia (P) vs Argentino (P)
- Clásico de la Comarca: Deportivo Viedma vs Atenas de Patagones
- Clásico Uruguayense: Tomás de Rocamora vs Parque Sur

=== Australia ===
- The Derby of Distance: Perth Wildcats vs New Zealand Breakers
  - Although this rivalry is actually an international rivalry, it plays out within the Australia-based National Basketball League. The Breakers have been an NBL member from the league's formation.
- Melbourne United vs Sydney Kings

=== Croatia ===
- Croatian Derby: Cibona vs Split
- Classic derby: Cibona vs. Zadar

=== China ===
- Northeastern Derby: Liaoning Flying Leopards vs Jilin Northeast Tigers
- Beijing Derby: Beijing Ducks vs Beijing Royal Fighters
- Chinese Classic: Beijing Ducks vs Guangdong Southern Tigers
- Derby of Champions: Liaoning Flying Leopards vs Guangdong Southern Tigers
- Battle of the Dynasties: Bayi Rockets vs Guangdong Southern Tigers
- Guangdong Derby: Shenzhen Leopards vs Guangdong Southern Tigers
- Xinjiang Flying Tigers vs Guangdong Southern Tigers

=== France ===
- Le Classique: Pau-Orthez vs Limoges
- Greater Paris Derby: Nanterre vs Metropolitans 92
- Alsace-Lorraine Derby: Nancy vs Strasbourg

=== Germany ===
- German Classic: Alba Berlin vs Bayern Munich vs Brose Bamberg

=== Greece ===
- Derby of the eternal enemies: Panathinaikos vs. Olympiacos
- Derby of Northern Greece: Aris vs. PAOK

=== Hong Kong ===
These are active Hong Kong A1 rivalries:

- Derby of Classics: South China vs. Winling
- South–East Clash: Eastern vs. South China
- Winling–Eastern Rivalry: Winling vs. Eastern

These are high school sports rivalries, but are primarily contested in basketball:

- Diocesan Boys School vs. Ying Wa College

=== Israel ===
- Tel Aviv derby: Maccabi Tel Aviv vs. Hapoel Tel Aviv
- Derby of Israel: Maccabi Tel Aviv vs. Hapoel Jerusalem

=== Italy ===
- Bologna Derby: Fortitudo Bologna vs Virtus Bologna
- Lombardy Derby: Olimpia Milano vs Varese vs Cantù
- Veneto Derby: Treviso vs Reyer Venezia
- Rome Derby: Virtus Roma vs Stella Azzurra Roma
- Piedmont Derby: Auxilium Torino vs Biella vs Junior Casale
- Via Emilia Derby: Reggiana vs Fortitudo Bologna or Virtus Bologna

=== Japan ===
- Tohoku Derby (basketball): Akita Northern Happinets vs Sendai 89ers

=== Korea Republic ===
- S-Derby: Seoul Samsung Thunders vs Seoul SK Knights
- Daegu Derby: Daegu KOGAS Pegasus vs Goyang Orion Orions

=== Lebanon ===
- Beirut derby: Al Riyadi vs Sagesse

=== Lithuania ===
- Rytas vs Žalgiris

=== North Macedonia ===
- Skopje basketball derby: Rabotnički vs. MZT Skopje

=== Philippines ===
==== Philippine Basketball Association ====
- SMC–MVP rivalry: Teams under the San Miguel Corporation vs. Teams under the Manny V. Pangilinan Group
- Manila Clasico: Barangay Ginebra vs. Magnolia
- Sibling Rivalry: Barangay Ginebra vs. San Miguel
- Barangay Ginebra–Meralco rivalry: Barangay Ginebra vs Meralco
- Barangay Ginebra–TNT rivalry: Barangay Ginebra vs. TNT
- San Miguel–TNT rivalry: San Miguel vs. TNT
- Magnolia vs. Rain or Shine

===== Historical =====
- Crispa–Toyota rivalry: Crispa vs. Toyota
- Ginebra–Shell rivalry: Ginebra vs. Shell
- Purefoods–Swift rivalry: Purefoods vs. Swift

==== College basketball ====
===== NCAA Philippines =====
- Arellano vs. San Beda (Arellano–San Beda rivalry)
- Battle of Intramuros
  - Letran vs. Lyceum
  - Letran vs. Mapúa
  - Lyceum vs. Mapúa
- JRU vs. San Sebastian (JRU–San Sebastian rivalry)
- San Beda vs. Letran (San Beda–Letran rivalry)
- San Beda vs. Perpetual (San Beda–Perpetual rivalry)
- San Beda vs. San Sebastian (San Beda–San Sebastian rivalry)
- San Sebastian vs. Letran (San Sebastian–Letran rivalry)

===== CESAFI =====
- UC vs. UV

=== Russia ===
- Moscow derby: Khimki vs CSKA Moscow
- Moscow region derby: Khimki Moscow vs. Triumph Lyubertsy
- Volga derby: BC Nizhny Novgorod vs. BC Krasny Oktyabr

=== Slovakia ===
- Miners' Derby: Handlová vs Prievidza

=== Slovenia ===
- Slovenian Classic: Krka vs Olimpija

=== Serbia ===
- Eternal Derby: Crvena zvezda vs. Partizan

=== Spain ===
- El Clásico: Barcelona vs. Real Madrid
- Basque derby: Baskonia vs. Bilbao, can also include GBC
- Canary Islands derby: Canarias vs Gran Canaria
- Madrid derby: Real Madrid vs Estudiantes
- Catalan derby: Joventut vs Barcelona
- Andalusian derby: Málaga vs Real Betis
- Galician derby: Obradoiro vs Breogán, can also include Ourense or Coruña

=== Taiwan ===
==== Taiwan Professional Basketball League ====
- New Taipei Series (Xinzhuang Derby): New Taipei CTBC DEA vs New Taipei Kings

=== Turkey ===
- Istanbul Derby: Galatasaray vs Fenerbahçe, Beşiktaş vs Fenerbahçe, Beşiktaş vs Galatasaray; can also include Darüşşafaka, Anadolu Efes and Istanbul BB
- Ankara Derby: Türk Telekom vs TED Ankara Kolejliler

=== United States and Canada ===
==== National Basketball Association ====
===== Individuals =====
1st party	2nd party	Timespan	Article	Source
Bill Russell	Wilt Chamberlain	1959–1969	Celtics–Lakers rivalry	
Magic Johnson	Larry Bird	1979–1991	Celtics–Lakers rivalry	
Michael Jordan	Bill Laimbeer	1988–1991	Bulls–Pistons rivalry	
Kobe Bryant	Shaquille O'Neal	1996–2011	Shaq–Kobe feud	
Kobe Bryant	Tim Duncan	1999–2016	Lakers–Spurs rivalry	
LeBron James	Kevin Durant	2012 – present	Cavaliers–Warriors rivalry Lakers–Suns rivalry	
LeBron James	Stephen Curry	2015–Present	Cavaliers–Warriors rivalry Lakers–Warriors rivalry	
Caitlin Clark	Angel Reese	2023–present	Clark–Reese rivalry	

== Bobsleigh ==
1st party	2nd party	Timespan	Article	Source
Switzerland	East Germany	1976–1990	—	
(Canada) (United States) Kaillie Humphries	(United States) Elana Meyers	2013–present	—	

== Bodybuilding ==
1st party	2nd party	Timespan	Article	Source
(Austria) Arnold Schwarzenegger	(Cuba) Sergio Oliva		—	
(United States) Lenda Murray	(United States) Iris Kyle		2002 Ms. Olympia; 2003 Ms. Olympia; 2004 Ms. Olympia	

== Boxing ==
=== Individual ===
1st party	2nd party	Timespan	Article(s)	Source
(United States) Sugar Ray Robinson	(United States) Jake LaMotta	1942–1951		
(United States) Muhammad Ali	(United States) Joe Frazier	1971–1975	Fight of the Century; Muhammad Ali vs. Joe Frazier II; Thrilla in Manila	
(United States) Sugar Ray Leonard	(Panama) Roberto Durán	1980–1989	The No Mas Fight	
(United States) Floyd Mayweather Jr.	(Argentina) Marcos Maidana	2014	Floyd Mayweather Jr. vs. Marcos Maidana; Floyd Mayweather Jr. vs. Marcos Maidana II	
(United States) Floyd Mayweather Jr.	(Philippines) Manny Pacquiao	2009–2015	Floyd Mayweather Jr. vs. Manny Pacquiao	
(Philippines) Manny Pacquiao	(Mexico) Juan Manuel Márquez	2004–2012	Manny Pacquiao vs. Juan Manuel Márquez III; Manny Pacquiao vs. Juan Manuel Márquez IV	
(Mexico) Érik Morales	(Philippines) Manny Pacquiao	2005–2006	Érik Morales vs. Manny Pacquiao; Érik Morales vs. Manny Pacquiao II; Manny Pacquiao vs. Érik Morales III	
(Mexico) Marco Antonio Barrera	(Mexico) Erik Morales	2000–2004	Barrera vs. Morales trilogy Erik Morales vs. Marco Antonio Barrera; Marco Antonio Barrera vs. Erik Morales II; Erik Morales vs. Marco Antonio Barrera III	
(United Kingdom) Tyson Fury	(United States) Deontay Wilder	2018–2021	Deontay Wilder vs. Tyson Fury; Deontay Wilder vs. Tyson Fury II; Tyson Fury vs. Deontay Wilder III	
(Mexico) Canelo Álvarez	(Kazakhstan) Gennady Golovkin	2017–2022	Canelo Álvarez vs. Gennady Golovkin; Canelo Álvarez vs. Gennady Golovkin II; Canelo Álvarez vs. Gennady Golovkin III	

=== Team ===
1st party	2nd party	Timespan	Article	Source
Mexico	Puerto Rico	1930s–2010s	Mexico–Puerto Rico boxing rivalry	

== Chess ==
1st party	2nd party	Timespan	Article	Source
(Germany) Emanuel Lasker	(Germany) Siegbert Tarrasch	1894–1908	World Chess Championship 1908	
(Cuba) José Raúl Capablanca	(France) Alexander Alekhine	1927–c.1938	World Chess Championship 1927	
(Russia) Garry Kasparov	(United States) Deep Blue	1996–1997	Deep Blue versus Garry Kasparov	
(United States) Bobby Fischer	(Soviet Union) (Russia) Boris Spassky	1972–1992	World Chess Championship 1972; Fischer–Spassky (1992 match)	
(India) Viswanathan Anand	(Soviet Union) (Russia) Vladimir Kramnik	1989–present	List of chess games between Anand and Kramnik	
(Russia) Vladimir Kramnik	(Russia) Garry Kasparov	1993–2004	List of chess games between Kasparov and Kramnik	
(Soviet Union) (Russia) Garry Kasparov	(Soviet Union) (Russia) Anatoly Karpov	1984–c.2000	Karpov–Kasparov rivalry	
(Norway) Magnus Carlsen	(United States) Hikaru Nakamura	2012–present	Magnus Carlsen Chess Tour 2020	

== Cricket ==
=== International ===
1st party	2nd party	Timespan	Article(s)	Source
England	Australia	1877–present	The Ashes (Tests)	
India	Bangladesh	2007–present	Bangladesh–India cricket rivalry/Asian Clásico (Overall) Ganguly–Durjoy Trophy (Tests)	
Australia	New Zealand	1946–present	Trans-Tasman Trophy (Tests); Chappell–Hadlee Trophy (ODI and T20I)	
England	India	1951–present	Anthony De Mello Trophy (Tests); Anderson–Tendulkar Trophy (Tests)	
India	Pakistan	1957–present	India–Pakistan cricket rivalry (Overall)	
Australia	West Indies	1960–present	Frank Worrell Trophy (Tests)	
England	West Indies	1963–present	Richards–Botham Trophy (Tests)	
Australia	India	1996–present	Border–Gavaskar Trophy (Tests); India–Australia cricket rivalry (Overall)	
Australia	South Africa	1999–present		
Pakistan	Australia	2019–present	Benaud–Qadir Trophy (Tests)	
England	New Zealand	2024–present	Crowe–Thorpe Trophy (Tests)	
Bangladesh	Sri Lanka	2018–present	Bangladesh–Sri Lanka cricket rivalry (Overall)	
South Africa	New Zealand	2024–present	Tangiwai Shield (Tests)	

=== Domestic ===
==== Australia ====
League Name	1st party	2nd party	Timespan	Article	Source
Big Bash League	Melbourne Renegades	Melbourne Stars	2011–present	Melbourne Derby	
Big Bash League	Sydney Sixers	Sydney Thunder	2011–present	Sydney Smash	
Sheffield Shield	New South Wales	Queensland	1892–present		

==== Bangladesh ====
League Name	1st party	2nd party	Timespan	Article	Source
Bangladesh Premier League	Dhaka Dynamites	Comilla Victorians	2015–2024	BPL Clásico	
Bangladesh Premier League	Rangpur Riders	Fortune Barishal	2024–2025	North–South Derby	
Dhaka Premier League	Abahani	Mohammedan	1972–present	Dhaka Derby	

==== England ====
League Name	1st party	2nd party	Timespan	Article	Source
County Clubs	Middlesex	Surrey		London derby	
County Clubs	Lancashire	Yorkshire		War of the Roses	
County Clubs	Warwickshire	Worcestershire		West Midlands derby	
County Clubs	Kent	Surrey	1709–present	The Oldest Rivalry	

==== India ====
League Name	1st party	2nd party	Timespan	Article	Source
Ranji Trophy Irani Cup Vijay Hazare Trophy Syed Mushtaq Ali Trophy	Karnataka	Tamil Nadu	1934–present	Kaveri Derby	
Ranji Trophy Irani Cup Vijay Hazare Trophy Syed Mushtaq Ali Trophy	Delhi	Bombay	1956–present		
Ranji Trophy Irani Cup Vijay Hazare Trophy Syed Mushtaq Ali Trophy	Maharashtra	Bombay	1960–present	Maratha Derby	
Ranji Trophy Irani Cup Vijay Hazare Trophy Syed Mushtaq Ali Trophy	Andhra	Hyderabad	1954–present	Telugu derby	
Indian Premier League	Chennai Super Kings	Mumbai Indians	2008–present	Chennai Mumbai Rivalry	
Indian Premier League	Kolkata Knight Riders	Royal Challengers Bangalore	2008–present	Kolkata Bangalore Rivalry	
Indian Premier League	Chennai Super Kings	Royal Challengers Bangalore	2008–present	South Indian Derby	

==== New Zealand ====
League Name	1st party	2nd party	Timespan	Article	Source
Plunket Shield The Ford Trophy Men's Super Smash	Auckland	Canterbury	1873–present		

==== Pakistan ====
League Name	1st party	2nd party	Timespan	Article	Source
Pakistan Super League	Karachi Kings	Lahore Qalandars	2016–present	Karachi Kings–Lahore Qalandars rivalry	

==== Sri Lanka ====
League Name	1st party	2nd party	Timespan	Article	Source
Lanka Premier League	Galle Marvels	Jaffna Kings	2022–present	LPL Clásico	
Big Match	Royal College, Colombo	S. Thomas' College, Mt Lavinia	1879–present	Royal–Thomian	

== Cue sports ==
1st party	2nd party	Discipline	Timespan	Source
(United States) Willie Mosconi	(United States) Rudolph Wanderone Jr.	Pool		
(Wales) Ray Reardon	(England) John Spencer	Snooker	1969–1988	
(Wales) Ray Reardon	(Northern Ireland) Alex Higgins	Snooker	1972–1986	
(Canada) Cliff Thorburn	(Northern Ireland) Alex Higgins	Snooker	1973–1989	
(England) Steve Davis	(Northern Ireland) Alex Higgins	Snooker	1979–1989	
(England) Steve Davis	(England) Jimmy White	Snooker	1981–2007	
(England) Steve Davis	(Scotland) Stephen Hendry	Snooker	1987–2009	
(Scotland) Stephen Hendry	(England) Jimmy White	Snooker	1986–2010	
(Scotland) Stephen Hendry	(England) Ronnie O'Sullivan	Snooker	1993–2011	
(Scotland) Stephen Hendry	(Scotland) John Higgins	Snooker	1995–2012	
(England) Ronnie O'Sullivan	(Scotland) John Higgins	Snooker	1994–present	
(England) Ronnie O'Sullivan	(England) Mark Selby	Snooker	2002–present	
(England) Ronnie O'Sullivan	(China) Ding Junhui	Snooker	2005–present	

== Curling ==
1st party	2nd party	Timespan	Article	Source
(Canada) Glenn Howard	(Canada) Kevin Martin	—		
(Canada) Jennifer Jones	(Canada) Kelly Scott	—		

== Cycling ==
1st party	2nd party	Discipline	Timespan	Article	Source
(Italy) Gino Bartali	(Italy) Fausto Coppi	road racing	1940–1956		
(France) Jacques Anquetil	(France) Raymond Poulidor	road racing	—		
(Belgium) Rik Van Looy	(Belgium) Benoni Beheyt	road racing	1963–1966		
(Belgium) Eddy Merckx	(Belgium) Roger De Vlaeminck	road racing	1969–1978		
(Belgium) Eddy Merckx	(Spain) Luis Ocaña	road racing	—		
(Italy) Francesco Moser	(Belgium) Roger De Vlaeminck	road racing	1974–1984		
(United States) Connie Carpenter-Phinney	(United States) Rebecca Twigg	road racing, track cycling	—		
(Republic of Ireland) Sean Kelly	(Belgium) Eric Vanderaerden	road racing			
(United States) Greg LeMond	(France) Bernard Hinault	road racing	1984–1986		
(United States) Greg LeMond	(France) Laurent Fignon	road racing	—		
(Scotland) Graeme Obree	(England) Chris Boardman	track cycling	—		
(Italy) Francesco Moser	(Italy) Beppe Saronni	road racing	1978–1986		
(United States) Lance Armstrong	(Italy) Marco Pantani	road racing	2000		
(Belgium) Frank Vandenbroucke	(Italy) Michele Bartoli	road racing	1999		
(Belgium) Lotto–Intermarché	(Belgium) Soudal–Quick-Step	road racing	–		
(Australia) Anna Meares	(United Kingdom) Victoria Pendleton	track cycling	–2012		
(Spain) Alberto Contador	(Luxembourg) Andy Schleck	road racing	—		
(Switzerland) Fabian Cancellara	(Belgium) Tom Boonen	road racing	2006–2016		
(United Kingdom) Chris Hoy	(France) Grégory Baugé	track cycling	2009–2012		
(United Kingdom) Laura Trott	(United States) Sarah Hammer	track cycling	2012–		
(United Kingdom) Mark Cavendish	(Germany) Marcel Kittel	road racing	—		
(United Kingdom) Chris Froome	(Spain) Alberto Contador	road racing	2013–2017		
(France) Julien Absalon	(Switzerland) Nino Schurter	cross-country	—		
(Spain) Alejandro Valverde	(Spain) Joaquim Rodríguez	road racing	2012–2016		
(Germany) Tony Martin	(Switzerland) Fabian Cancellara	road racing	—		
Australia	(United Kingdom) Great Britain	track cycling	–		
(Belgium) Wout Van Aert	(Netherlands) Mathieu van der Poel	cyclo-cross, road racing	2014–	Van Aert–Van der Poel rivalry	
(Slovakia) Peter Sagan	(Belgium) Greg Van Avermaet	road racing	2015–		
(France) Nacer Bouhanni	(France) Arnaud Démare	road racing	—		
(Slovakia) Peter Sagan	(Poland) Michał Kwiatkowski	road racing	—		
(France) Pauline Ferrand-Prévot	(Switzerland) Jolanda Neff	cross-country	—		
(Netherlands) Annemiek van Vleuten	(Netherlands) Anna van der Breggen	road racing	2017–2021		
(Slovenia) Tadej Pogačar	(Denmark) Jonas Vingegaard	road racing	2021–	Pogačar–Vingegaard rivalry	
(Netherlands) Annemiek van Vleuten	(Netherlands) Demi Vollering	road racing	2022–2023		
(Netherlands) Mathieu van der Poel	(Slovenia) Tadej Pogačar	Classic cycle races	2023–		
(Netherlands) Team SD Worx–Protime	(United States) Lidl–Trek	road racing	–		

== Darts ==
1st party (Years active)	2nd party (Years active)	Timespan	Source
(Scotland) Jocky Wilson (1978–1996)	(England) Eric Bristow (1976–2007)	1980–1989	
(England) John Lowe (1976–2007)	(England) Eric Bristow (1976–2007)	1978–1993	
(England) Phil Taylor (1986–2018)	(Netherlands) Raymond van Barneveld (1987–2019)	2006–2018	
(Wales) Gerwyn Price (2014–present )	(Scotland) Gary Anderson (2001–present)	2018–present	
(England) Luke Littler (2023–present)	(England) Luke Humphries (2011–present)	2024–present	

== Diving ==
1st party	2nd party	Timespan	Article	Source
(China) Qiu Bo	(United Kingdom) Tom Daley			

== Esports ==
1st party	2nd party	Discipline	Timespan	Article	Source
Team SoloMid	Cloud9	League of Legends	2013–2023		
Alliance	Natus Vincere	Dota 2	2013–2016		
FaZe Clan	OpTic Gaming	Call of Duty, Counter-Strike	2013–present		
T1 (Note: SK Telecom T1 rebranded as T1 in late 2019.)	Royal Never Give Up (Note: Royal Club was relegated to the LoL Secondary Pro League (LSPL) by Gamtee during the 2015 LPL Summer promotion tournament. Shortly afterwards, the LPL spot of Gamtee was acquired by Royal Club and rebranded as Royal Never Give Up. Royal Club has since remained in China's secondary league, now known as the LoL Development League (LDL), as the organization's academy team.)	League of Legends	2013–2022		
Edward Gaming	T1	League of Legends	2015–present		
Gen.G (Note: Gen.G was founded in August 2017 and acquired the LCK spot and players of Samsung Galaxy in late 2017.)	T1	League of Legends	2014–present		
SK Gaming	Virtus.pro	Counter-Strike	2015–2018		
KT Rolster	T1	StarCraft: Brood War, League of Legends	2004–present	The Telecom Wars	
G2 Esports	Fnatic	League of Legends	2016–present		

== Field hockey ==
1st party	2nd party	Timespan	Article	Source
India	Pakistan	1947–present	India–Pakistan field hockey rivalry	

== Figure skating ==
1st party	2nd party	Discipline	Timespan	Article	Source
(United States) Linda Fratianne	(East Germany) Anett Pötzsch	Women's singles	1973–1980		
(United States) Scott Hamilton	(United States) Scott Cramer	Men's singles	1976–1980		
(United States) Brian Boitano	(Canada) Brian Orser	Men's singles	1982–1988	See also: Battle of the Brians	
(East Germany) Katarina Witt	(United States) Debi Thomas	Women's singles	1984–1988	See also: Battle of the Carmens	
(United States) Nancy Kerrigan	(United States) Tonya Harding	Women's singles	1990–1994	See also: Assault of Nancy Kerrigan	
(Russia) Maya Usova (Russia) Alexander Zhulin	(Russia) Oksana Grishuk (Russia) Evgeny Platov	Ice dance	1992–1994		
(United States) Michelle Kwan	(United States) Tara Lipinski	Women's singles	1996–1998		
(Canada) Jamie Salé (Canada) David Pelletier	(Russia) Elena Berezhnaya (Russia) Anton Sikharulidze	Pairs	1998–2002	See also: 2002 Winter Olympics figure skating scandal	
(Russia) Alexei Yagudin	(Russia) Evgeni Plushenko	Men's singles	1997–2002		
(United States) Todd Eldredge	(United States) Timothy Goebel	Men's singles	1998–2002		
(South Korea) Yuna Kim	(Japan) Mao Asada	Women's singles	2005–2014		
(Canada) Tessa Virtue (Canada) Scott Moir	(United States) Meryl Davis (United States) Charlie White	Ice dance	2006–2014		
(Canada) Tessa Virtue (Canada) Scott Moir	(France) Gabriella Papadakis (France) Guillaume Cizeron	Ice dance	2016–2018		
(Japan) Yuzuru Hanyu	(Canada) Patrick Chan	Men's singles	2010–2018		
(Japan) Yuzuru Hanyu	(Spain) Javier Fernández	Men's singles	2010–2018		
(Japan) Yuzuru Hanyu	(United States) Nathan Chen	Men's singles	2016–2022		
(Russia) Evgenia Medvedeva	(Russia) Alina Zagitova	Women's singles	2017–2019		

== Golf ==
1st party	2nd party	3rd party	Timespan	Article	Source
United States	Europe		—	Ryder Cup	
(United States) Arnold Palmer	(United States) Jack Nicklaus		1958–1980		
(United States) Tom Watson	(United States) Gary McCord		—		
(United States) Jack Nicklaus	(United States) Tom Watson		1977–1982		
(United States) Jack Nicklaus	(United States) Lee Trevino		—		
(United States) Jack Nicklaus	(United States) Tom Weiskopf		—		
(United States) Paul Runyan	(United States) Sam Snead		—		
(United States) Ben Hogan	(United States) Sam Snead		1938–1967		
(United States) Ben Hogan	(United States) Byron Nelson		1935–1946		
(United States) Tiger Woods	(United States) Phil Mickelson		1996–present		
(United States) Walter Hagen	(United States) Bobby Jones		1914–1930		
(United States) Walter Hagen	(United States) Gene Sarazen		—		
(United States) Mickey Wright	(United States) Kathy Whitworth		1958–1973		
(Australia) Greg Norman	(United States) Tim Finchem		—		
(Australia) Greg Norman	(England) Nick Faldo		—		
(United States) Johnny Miller	(England) Nick Faldo		—		
Oklahoma State Cowboys	Houston Cougars		—		
(England) J.H. Taylor	(Jersey) Harry Vardon	(Scotland) James Braid	—	Great Triumvirate	
(United States) Glenna Collett Vare	(England) Joyce Wethered		—		
(Republic of Ireland) Pádraig Harrington	(Spain) Sergio García		—		
(Sweden) Annika Sörenstam	(Australia) Karrie Webb		—		
(Spain) Seve Ballesteros	(United States) Paul Azinger		—		
(Scotland) Willie Park Sr.	(Scotland) Tom Morris		—		
(United States) Ben Hogan (United States) Byron Nelson	(United States) Harvie Ward (United States) Ken Venturi		—		
(United States) Tom Kite	(United States) Ben Crenshaw		—		
(Spain) Seve Ballesteros	(United States) Deane Beman		—		
(United States) Louise Suggs	(United States) Babe Zaharias		1948–1954		
(South Africa) Rory Sabbatini	(United States) Ben Crane		—		
(Scotland) Colin Montgomerie	(Scotland) Sandy Lyle		—		
(United States) Bryson DeChambeau	(United States) Brooks Koepka		2019–present		

== Gridiron football ==
=== American football ===
==== Individual ====
1st party	2nd party	Timespan	Article	Source
Jerry Rice	Deion Sanders	1989–1996	—	
Tom Brady	Peyton Manning	2000–2016	Brady–Manning rivalry	
Eli Manning	Peyton Manning	2006–2013	Manning Bowl	
Josh Allen	Patrick Mahomes	2018–present	Allen–Mahomes rivalry	

=== College football ===
==== Mexico ====
ONEFA/CONADEIP (National College Association of American Football/National College Sports Commission of Private Institutions)

- Clásico Estudiantil (Student Derby): Pumas Dorados de la UNAM vs Águilas Blancas del IPN
- Clásico Estudiantil Regiomontano (Monterrey's Student Derby): Borregos Salvajes ITESM vs Auténticos Tigres

==== Canada ====
- Panda Game: University of Ottawa Gee-Gees versus Carleton University Ravens
- Shrum Bowl : University of British Columbia Thunderbirds versus Simon Fraser University Clan

=== Canadian football ===
1st party	2nd party	Timespan	Article	Source
Hamilton Tiger-Cats	Toronto Argonauts	1873–present	Harold Ballard Trophy	
Hamilton Tiger-Cats	Montreal Alouettes/Concordes	1982–present	Classique	
Winnipeg Blue Bombers	Saskatchewan Roughriders	1936–present	Banjo Bowl	
Edmonton Elks	Calgary Stampeders	1949–present	Battle of Alberta	

== Gymnastics ==
1st party	2nd party	Timespan	Source
United States	People's Republic of China	—	
Japan	People's Republic of China	–present	
Russia	Romania	–present	

== Handball ==
=== Austria ===
- Bregenz derby: Bregenz Handball vs. Alpla HC Hard

=== Belarus ===
- Minsk derbies: Dinamo Minsk vs. SKA Minsk vs. Arkatron Minsk

=== Belgium ===
- Liège derbies:
  - ROC Flémalle vs. Union Beynoise
  - ROC Flémalle vs. Jeunesse Jemeppe (previously vs. Progrès HC Seraing).
  - Union Beynoise vs. HC Herstal.
  - JS Herstal vs. HC Herstal.
  - Union Beynoise vs. HC Visé BM.
- Germanophone derby : HC Eynatten-Raeren vs. KTSV Eupen 1889
- Limburg derbies: HB Sint-Truiden vs. Initia HC Hasselt vs. United HC Tongeren vs. Achilles Bocholt vs. Sporting Neerpelt-Lommel vs. Kreasa HB Houthalen vs. DHC Meeuwen.
- Antwerp derbies: KV Sasja HC Hoboken vs. Olse Merksem HC vs. DHW Antwerpen vs. HV Uilenspiegel Wilrijk.
- Hainuyé derby: EHC Tournai vs. Entente du Centre CLH
- Flanders derby: HC DB Gent vs. HKW Waasmunster
- Brussels derby: HC Kraainem vs. United Brussels HC
- Charleroi derby: SHC Mont-sur-Marchienne vs. HBC Charleroi-Ransart

=== Croatia ===
- Zagreb derbies:
  - RK Dubrava Zagreb vs. RK Medveščak Zagreb
  - Zagreb vs. RK Medveščak Zagreb
  - RK Dubrava Zagreb vs. Zagreb
- Zagreb vs. Nexe (2010s – ongoing)

=== Denmark ===
- Copenhagen derbies: (previously) FC Copenhagen vs. AG København vs. KIF Kolding Copenhagen vs. Ajax Copenhagen
- Midtjylland: Viborg HK vs. Ikast Håndbold

=== France ===
- Val-de-Marne derby: US Créteil vs. US Ivry
- Languedoc derby: Montpellier HB vs. USAM Nîmes

=== Germany ===
- Central Hesse derby: TV Hüttenberg vs. HSG Wetzlar
- Ostderby: SC Magdeburg vs. Füchse Berlin
- Schleswig-Holstein derbies:
  - THW Kiel vs. SG Flensburg-Handewitt
  - GWD Minden vs. TuS Nettelstedt-Lübbecke
  - Nordderby:
    - SG Flensburg-Handewitt vs. HSV Hamburg
    - THW Kiel vs. HSV Hamburg

=== Israel ===
- Rishon LeZion derby: Hapoel Rishon LeZion vs. Maccabi Rishon LeZion

=== Hungary ===
- Hungarian derby: Veszprém vs. Szeged
- Ferencváros vs. Győri ETO

=== Macedonia ===
- Macedonian derby: RK Vardar Skopje vs. Pelister Bitola
- Skopje derby: RK Metalurg Skopje vs. Vardar

=== Poland ===
Lomza Vive Kielce vs. Orlen Wisla Plock

=== Portugal ===
- Derby de Lisboa: Sporting CP vs. Benfica

=== Romania ===
- Steaua București vs. Dinamo București

=== Russia ===
- Moscow : CSKA Moscow vs. MAI Moscow

=== Serbia ===
- Belgrade derby: Red Star vs. Partizan

=== Slovenia ===
- Styrian derby: RK Maribor Branik vs. RK Celje Pivovarna Laško or RK Trimo Trebnje vs. RK Jeruzalem Ormož

=== Spain ===
- Catalan derby: Barcelona vs. Granollers

=== Sweden ===
- Gothenburg region derby: Redbergslid vs. Sävehof
- Ystad derby: IFK Ystad vs. Ystads IF

=== Tunisia ===
- Tunis derby: Club Africain vs. Espérance Sportive

=== Ukraine ===
- Zaporizhzhia derby: HC ZTR Zaporizhzhia vs. HC Motor Zaporizhzhia

== Horse racing ==
1st party	2nd party	Timespan	Source
Seabiscuit	War Admiral	1938	
Affirmed	Alydar	1978–1979	
Sunday Silence	Easy Goer	1989	
Hurricane Fly	Jezki	2014	

== Ice hockey ==
=== North America ===
==== ECHL ====
- Fort Wayne Komets vs. Indy Fuel

==== FPHL ====
- Twin City Thunderbirds vs. Columbus River Dragons

==== Junior ====
- Fairbanks Ice Dogs (NAHL) vs. Wenatchee Wild (BCHL)

==== Canadian Hockey League ====
- Brandon Wheat Kings vs. Winnipeg Ice (WHL)
- Calgary Hitmen vs. Edmonton Oil Kings (WHL)
- Cape Breton Eagles vs. Halifax Mooseheads (QMJHL)
- Everett Silvertips vs. Seattle Thunderbirds (WHL)
- Flint Firebirds vs. Saginaw Spirit (OHL)
- Guelph Storm vs. Kitchener Rangers (OHL)
- Kamloops Blazers vs. Kelowna Rockets (WHL)
- Kelowna Rockets vs. Portland Winterhawks (WHL)
- Kitchener Rangers vs. London Knights (OHL)
- Lethbridge Hurricanes vs. Medicine Hat Tigers (WHL)
- London Knights vs. Windsor Spitfires (OHL)
- Moncton Wildcats vs. Saint John Sea Dogs (QMJHL)
- Moose Jaw Warriors vs. Swift Current Broncos (WHL)
- Niagara IceDogs vs. Hamilton Bulldogs (OHL)
- Niagara IceDogs vs. Oshawa Generals (OHL)
- Niagara IceDogs vs. Barrie Colts (OHL)
- Niagara IceDogs vs. North Bay Battalion (OHL)
- Niagara IceDogs vs. Mississauga Steelheads (OHL)
- Oshawa Generals vs. Peterborough Petes (OHL)
- Prince Albert Raiders vs. Saskatoon Blades (WHL)
- Regina Pats vs. Moose Jaw Warriors (WHL)
- Quebec Remparts vs. Rimouski Oceanic (QMJHL)
- Sarnia Sting vs. Windsor Spitfires (OHL)
- Saskatoon Blades vs. Regina Pats (WHL)
- Saskatoon Blades vs. Moose Jaw Warriors (WHL)
- Sault Ste. Marie Greyhounds vs. Sudbury Wolves (OHL)
- Tri-City Americans vs. Spokane Chiefs (WHL)
- Vancouver Giants vs. Victoria Royals (WHL)
- Sarnia Sting vs London Knights (OHL)

==== College ====
- Air Force vs. Army
- Alaska vs. Alaska–Anchorage
- Battle for Pikes Peak: Air Force vs. Colorado College
- Battle for the Gold Pan: Colorado College vs. Denver
- Battle of Whitney Avenue: Quinnipiac vs. Yale
- BU–Maine Rivalry: Boston University vs. Maine
- Border Battle: Maine vs. New Hampshire
- Clarkson vs. St. Lawrence
- Cornell–Harvard rivalry: Cornell vs. Harvard
- Dartmouth–New Hampshire rivalry: Dartmouth vs. New Hampshire
- Green Line Rivalry: Boston College vs. Boston University
- Harvard–Yale rivalry: Harvard vs. Yale
- Holy War on Ice: Boston College vs. Notre Dame
- Michigan vs. Michigan State
- Michigan vs. Notre Dame
- Michigan vs. Ohio State
- Michigan Tech vs. Northern Michigan
- Minnesota vs. Wisconsin
- RPI vs. Union

=== Europe ===
==== Austria ====
- Carinthian Derby: Klagenfurter AC vs. Villacher SV

==== Czech Republic ====
- Prague derby: Slavia Prague vs. Sparta Prague
- LHK Jestřábi Prostějov vs. AZ Havířov
- LHK Jestřábi Prostějov vs. Zubr Přerov
- LHK Jestřábi Prostějov vs. Draci Šumperk
- HC Olomouc vs. LHK Jestřábi Prostějov
- HC Pardubice vs. HC Hradec Králové
- HC Poruba vs. Zubr Přerov
- HC Vítkovice vs. Oceláři Třinec
- Sparta Prague vs. Rytíři Kladno
- VHK Vsetín vs. Berani Zlín

==== Finland ====
- Satakunnan derby: Ässät Pori vs. Lukko Rauma
- Stadin derby: HIFK Helsinki vs. Helsinki Jokerit
- Tampereen derby: Tampere Ilves vs. Tampere Tappara
- Savon derby: KalPa vs. Jukurit
- Kasitien derby: Ässät vs. Sport
- Länsirannikon derby: HC TPS vs. Lukko
- Järvi-Suomen derby: KalPa vs. JYP

==== France ====
- Gothiques d'Amiens vs. Dragons de Rouen
- Brûleurs de Loups vs. Ours de Villard-de-Lans
- Diables Rouges de Briançon vs. Rapaces de Gap

==== Germany ====
- Düsseldorfer EG vs. Kölner Haie vs. Krefeld Pinguine
- Löwen Frankfurt vs. Kassel Huskies
- ERC Ingolstadt vs. Augsburger Panther

==== Italy ====
- Hockey Club Torino vs. Hockey Club Valpellice

==== Norway ====
- Vålerenga vs. Stavanger Oilers
- Østfold-derby: Stjernen vs. Sparta Warriors
- Mjøs-derby: Storhamar vs. Lillehammer IK
- Oslo-derby: Vålerenga vs. Furuset
- Klassikern: Vålerenga vs. Storhamar

==== Romania ====
- Steaua București vs. Sport Club Miercurea Ciuc

==== Slovakia ====
- HKm Zvolen vs. MsHK Zilina
- MsHK Žilina vs. MHC Martin

==== Sweden ====
- Stockholm derby – AIK vs. Hammarby IF vs. Djurgårdens IF
- Western derby – Färjestad vs. Frölunda
- Daladerby: Leksands IF vs. Mora IK
- Southwest derby: Rögle BK vs. Malmö Redhawks
- Västerbotten derby: IF Björklöven vs. Skellefteå AIK
- Timrå IK vs. IF Sundsvall
- Västernorrland derby: Timrå IK vs. Modo Hockey

==== Switzerland ====
- Derby of Switzerland – HC Davos vs. EHC Kloten
- Ticino derby: HC Lugano vs. HC Ambri-Piotta
- Zähringen derby: HC Fribourg-Gottéron vs. SC Bern
- Zuricher derby: Kloten Flyers vs. ZSC Lions
- Berner derby : SC Bern vs. EHC Biel
- Gotthard derby: EV Zug vs. HC Ambri-Piotta
- Zürisee derby: ZSC Lions vs. Rapperswil-Jona Lakers
- Romandy derby: HC Fribourg-Gottéron vs. Servette Geneva
- Bündner derby: EHC Arosa vs. EHC Chur vs. HC Davos
- Lemanic derby: Servette Geneva vs. Lausanne HC
- Valais derby: HC Sierre-Anniviers vs. EHC Visp

=== International ===
1st party	2nd party	Timespan	Article(s)	Source
Canada	Russia; Soviet Union	1954, but especially after 1972, to present	Summit Series; 2008 IIHF World Championship final	
Canada men	USA men	1920–present	Canada–United States rivalry	
Canada women	USA women	1990–present	Canada–United States women's rivalry	
Canada U20	USA U20	1973–present	Canada–United States junior rivalry	
Czechoslovakia	Soviet Union	1954, but especially after 1968, to 1993	1954 World Ice Hockey Championships	
Czech Republic	Russia	1993–present	1998 Winter Olympics gold medal game 2010 IIHF World Championship final	
Czech Republic	Slovakia	1994–present	Czech Republic–Slovakia rivalry	
Finland	Sweden	1932–present	—	

=== Individual ===
1st party	2nd party	Timespan	Article(s)	Source
(Canada) Sidney Crosby	(Russia) Alexander Ovechkin	2005–present	Capitals–Penguins rivalry	

== Lacrosse ==
1st party	2nd party	Timespan	Article	Source
Cornell	Princeton	1922–present	Cornell–Princeton lacrosse rivalry	
Johns Hopkins	Loyola (MD)	1939–present	Johns Hopkins–Loyola lacrosse rivalry	
Johns Hopkins	Maryland	1895–present	Johns Hopkins–Maryland lacrosse rivalry	

== Luge ==
1st party	2nd party	Timespan	Article	Source
(Austria) Markus Prock	(Germany) Georg Hackl	1988–2002	–	
(Germany) Tatjana Hüfner	(Germany) Natalie Geisenberger	2008–2019	–	

== Mixed martial arts ==
1st party	2nd party	Timespan	Article	Source
Brazilian jiu-jitsu practitioners	Luta Livre practitioners	1930s–1997		
(Brazil) Royce Gracie	(United States) Ken Shamrock	1993–2016		
(Russia) Fedor Emelianenko	(Brazil) Rodrigo Minotauro			
(United States) Matt Hughes	(United States) B.J. Penn			
(United States) Chuck Liddell	(United States) Tito Ortiz	2004–2018	Chuck Liddell vs. Tito Ortiz	
(United States) Chuck Liddell	(United States) Randy Couture		Randy Couture vs. Chuck Liddell	
(United States) Tito Ortiz	(United States) Ken Shamrock			
(Japan) Kazushi Sakuraba	(Brazil) Royler Gracie (Brazil) Royce Gracie (Brazil) Renzo Gracie (Brazil) Ryan Gracie (Gracie family)	1999–2007	Kazushi Sakuraba vs. Royce Gracie	
(Cuba) Jose Landi (Brazil) Wanderlei Silva (Brazil) Maurício Shogun (Brazil) Anderson Silva (Chute Boxe)	(Brazil) Rodrigo Minotauro (Brazil) Murilo Bustamante (Brazil) Vitor Belfort (Brazil) Rogério Minotouro (Top Team)	2002–2007		
(United States) Quinton Jackson	(Brazil) Wanderlei Silva	2003–2018	Wanderlei Silva vs. Quinton Jackson	
(United States) Brock Lesnar	(United States) Frank Mir			
(United States) Dominick Cruz	(United States) Urijah Faber			
(United States) Jon Jones	(United States) Daniel Cormier	2014–2017		
(United States) Ronda Rousey	(United States) Miesha Tate	2012–2013	Miesha Tate vs. Ronda Rousey	
(United States) Chael Sonnen	(Brazil) Anderson Silva	2010–2012		
(United States) Michael Chandler	(United States) Eddie Alvarez			
(United States) Frankie Edgar	(United States) Gray Maynard			
(United States) Gilbert Melendez	(United States) Josh Thomson			
(United States) Tim Sylvia	(Belarus) Andrei Arlovski			
(United States) Cain Velasquez	(Brazil) Junior dos Santos	2011–2014		
(United States) Matt Serra	(Canada) Georges St-Pierre	2007–2008		
(Republic of Ireland) Conor McGregor	(United States) Nate Diaz	2016		
(Republic of Ireland) Conor McGregor	(Russia) Khabib Nurmagomedov	2014–2021		
(Republic of Ireland) Conor McGregor	(United States) Dustin Poirier	2021–present		
(Mexico) Brandon Moreno	(Brazil) Deiveson Figueiredo	2020–2023		
(Nigeria) Israel Adesanya	(Brazil) Alex Pereira	2016–2023		
(Nigeria) Israel Adesanya	(South Africa) Dricus du Plessis	2023–present		
(Mexico) Alexa Grasso	(Kyrgyzstan) Valentina Shevchenko	2023–2024		

=== Other martial arts ===
==== Lethwei ====
1st party	2nd party	Timespan	Article	Source
(Canada) (Myanmar) Dave Leduc	(Myanmar) Tun Tun Min	2016–2018	Dave Leduc vs. Tun Tun Min III	

==== Judo ====
1st party	2nd party	Timespan	Article	Source
(South Korea) Kim Jae-Bum	(Germany) Ole Bischof	2008–present		
(Netherlands) Anton Geesink	(Japan) Akio Kaminaga	1964		

==== Sumo ====
1st party	2nd party	Timespan	Article	Source
(Japan) Takanohana Kōji	(United States) (Japan) Akebono Tarō	1990–2000		

== Motorsport ==
=== Manufacturers, cars, teams ===
1st party	2nd party	Discipline	Timespan	Article	Source
Bugatti	Bentley	24 Hours of Le Mans	1923–1930		
Mercedes-Benz	Auto Union	Grand Prix	1934–1939	Silver Arrows	
Ferrari	Alfa Romeo	Formula One	—		
Jaguar Cars	Mercedes-Benz	World Championship for Sports Cars	1955, 1988–1991	See also: 1955 Le Mans disaster	
Ford	Ferrari	International Championship for Sports Cars; 24 Hours of Le Mans	1963–1967	See also Ford v Ferrari, a 2019 film based on this rivalry.	
Shelby Cobra	Ferrari 250 GTO	International Championship for GT Manufacturers	1963–1965		
Ford Mustang	Chevrolet Camaro	Trans-Am Series	1968–1972		
Petty Enterprises	Wood Brothers Racing	NASCAR Cup Series	–		
Porsche 917	Ferrari 512	International Championship for Makes	1969–1971		
Nissan Skyline GT-R	Mazda R100 and RX-3	Fuji Super Touring Race	1969–1973		
Bob Sharp Racing	Brock Racing Enterprise	SCCA National Championship Runoffs	–1971		
McLaren	Ferrari	Formula One	1976–present		
Bigfoot	Grave Digger	monster truck	—1998		
Chip Ganassi Racing	Penske Racing	CART; IndyCar Series; NASCAR Cup Series; WeatherTech SportsCar Championship	—		
Ford Galaxie and Ford Falcon	Mini	British Touring Car Championship	1960s		
Lancia	Audi	World Rally Championship	—		
Team Losi	Team Associated	Radio controlled car racing	1988–present		
Hendrick Motorsports	Penske Racing	NASCAR Cup Series	1989–present		
Holden	Ford Australia	Australian Touring Car Championship; Supercars Championship	—		
Ford Sierra RS500	BMW M3	Touring car racing	1987–1992		
Subaru	Mitsubishi	World Rally Championship	1990s–present		
Spirit of America Formula Shell LSRV	ThrustSSC	Land speed record	1996–1997		
Audi	Peugeot	24 Hours of Le Mans	2007–2011		
Audi	Toyota	World Endurance Championship	2012–2016		
Mercedes	Ferrari	Formula One	2013–present		
Toyota	Hyundai	World Rally Championship	2017–present		
Mercedes	Red Bull Racing	Formula One	2013–present		
Red Bull Racing	Ferrari	Formula One	2013–present		
Chip Ganassi Racing	Arrow McLaren	Indycar Series	2022–present		
Red Bull Racing	McLaren	Formula One	2024–present		

=== Drivers and riders ===
1st party	2nd party	Discipline	Timespan	Article	Source
(United States) Barney Oldfield	(United States) Ralph DePalma	American Championship Car Racing	1908–1918		
(United Kingdom) Malcolm Campbell	(United Kingdom) Henry Segrave	Land speed record	1926–1930		
(Italy) Tazio Nuvolari	(Italy) Achille Varzi	Grand Prix	1930–1948		
(Germany) Rudolf Caracciola	(Germany) Bernd Rosemeyer	Grand Prix	1935–1938		
(United Kingdom) John Cobb	(United Kingdom) George Eyston	Land speed record	1937–1939		
(Italy) Piero Taruffi	(Italy) Felice Bonetto	Formula One; Grand Prix; Sports car racing	–1953		
(United States) Art Arfons	(United States) Walt Arfons	Land speed record	1952–1966		
(Argentina) Juan Manuel Fangio	(United Kingdom) Stirling Moss	Formula One	1954–1957		
(United Kingdom) Tommy Sopwith	(United Kingdom) Jack Sears	British Saloon Car Championship	1958		
(United States) Richard Petty	(United States) David Pearson	Winston Cup	1960–1980		
(United Kingdom) Jim Clark	(United Kingdom) Graham Hill	Formula One	1962–1967		
(United States) Art Arfons	(United States) Craig Breedlove	Land speed record	1964–1966		
(United States) Don Prudhomme	(United States) Tom McEwen	NHRA funny car drag racing	1964–1973		
(Italy) Giacomo Agostini	(United Kingdom) Mike Hailwood	Grand Prix motorcycling	1965–1967		
(United States) A. J. Foyt	(United States) Mario Andretti	American Championship Car Racing	1965–1992		
(United Kingdom) Phil Read	(United Kingdom) Bill Ivy	Grand Prix motorcycling	1968		
(United States) Bobby Allison	(United States) Junior Johnson	Winston Cup	Late 1960s		
(United States) Richard Petty	(United States) Bobby Allison	Winston Cup	1970s		
(Switzerland) Jo Siffert	(Mexico) Pedro Rodríguez	Formula One; International Championship for Makes	1970–1971		
(Austria) Niki Lauda	(United Kingdom) James Hunt	Formula One	1976–1977	Hunt–Lauda rivalry	
(Brazil) Ayrton Senna	(United Kingdom) Terry Fullerton	Karting World Championship	1978–1980		
(United Kingdom) Barry Sheene	(United States) Kenny Roberts	Grand Prix motorcycling	1978–1982		
(United States) Richard Petty	(United States) Cale Yarborough	Winston Cup	Late 1970s	1979 Daytona 500	
(United States) Cale Yarborough	(United States) Bobby Allison (United States) Donnie Allison	Winston Cup	1979 Daytona 500		
(United States) Darrell Waltrip	(United States) Cale Yarborough (United States) Bobby Allison	Winston Cup	Early 1980s		
(United States) Dale Earnhardt	(United States) Geoff Bodine	Winston Cup	1980's		
(Australia) Alan Jones	(Argentina) Carlos Reutemann	Formula One	1981		
(Australia) Alan Jones	(Brazil) Nelson Piquet	Formula One	1980–1981		
(France) Didier Pironi	(Canada) Gilles Villeneuve	Formula One	1982		
(United Kingdom) Nigel Mansell	(Brazil) Nelson Piquet	Formula One	1986–1992		
(United States) Wayne Rainey	(United States) Kevin Schwantz	Grand Prix motorcycling	1986–1993		
(France) Alain Prost	(Brazil) Ayrton Senna	Formula One	1988–1991, 1993	Prost–Senna rivalry	
(New Zealand) Rod Millen	(Japan) Nobuhiro Tajima	Hillclimbing	1990s–2000		
(United Kingdom) Carl Fogarty	(United States) Scott Russell	Superbike World Championship	1992–1994		
(Japan) Masami Hirosaka	(United States) Brian Kinwald	IFMAR 1:10 Electric Off-Road World Championship	1993–1999		
(United States) Jeff Gordon	(United States) Dale Earnhardt	Winston Cup	1994–2001		
(United Kingdom) Damon Hill	(Germany) Michael Schumacher	Formula One	1994–1996	Hill–Schumacher rivalry	
(Spain) Carlos Sainz	(United Kingdom) Colin McRae	World Rally Championship	1995		
(United Kingdom) Matt Neal	(United Kingdom) Jason Plato	British Touring Car Championship	1997–present		
(Germany) Michael Schumacher	(Canada) Jacques Villeneuve	Formula One	1997		
(Italy) Loris Capirossi	(Japan) Tetsuya Harada	Grand Prix motorcycling	1998		
(United Kingdom) Niall Mackenzie	(United Kingdom) Steve Hislop	British Superbike Championship	1998		
(United Kingdom) Neil Hodgson	(New Zealand) Aaron Slight	Superbike World Championship	1998		
(Finland) Mika Häkkinen	(Germany) Michael Schumacher	Formula One	1998–2001	Häkkinen–Schumacher rivalry	
(France) Sébastien Loeb	(Finland) Marcus Grönholm	World Rally Championship	1999–2007		
(United Kingdom) Chris Walker	(United Kingdom) Neil Hodgson	British Superbike Championship	2000		
(Italy) Valentino Rossi	(Italy) Max Biaggi	Grand Prix motorcycling	2000–2006		
(United States) Ben Spies	(Australia) Mat Mladin	AMA Superbike Championship	2000–2008		
(Germany) Michael Schumacher	(Colombia) Juan Pablo Montoya	Formula One	2001–2005		
(United States) Jimmy Spencer	(United States) Kurt Busch	Winston Cup	2002–2003		
(United States) Jeff Gordon	(United States) Jimmie Johnson	Sprint Cup Series	2002–2015		
(United States) Kurt Busch	(United States) Jimmie Johnson	Sprint Cup Series	2004–2010		
(Germany) Michael Schumacher	(Spain) Fernando Alonso	Formula One	2005–2006		
(United Kingdom) Dario Franchitti	(New Zealand) Scott Dixon	IndyCar	2007, 2009–2013		
(United Kingdom) Lewis Hamilton	(Spain) Fernando Alonso	Formula One	2007–present		
(Finland) Kimi Räikkönen	(Spain) Fernando Alonso	Formula One	2005 and 2007		
(Finland) Kimi Räikkönen	(United Kingdom) Lewis Hamilton	Formula One	2007		
(United Kingdom) Lewis Hamilton	(Brazil) Felipe Massa	Formula One	2008		
(United States) Carl Edwards	(United States) Brad Keselowski	Sprint Cup Series	2009–2010		
(Germany) Sebastian Vettel	(Spain) Fernando Alonso	Formula One	2010–2013		
(France) Sébastien Loeb	(France) Sébastien Ogier	World Rally Championship	2011		
(Monaco) Charles Leclerc	(Netherlands) Max Verstappen	Kart racing Formula One	2012–2013, 2019–present		
(United Kingdom) Lewis Hamilton	(Germany) Nico Rosberg	Formula One	2013–2016	Hamilton–Rosberg rivalry	
(Spain) Marc Márquez	(Italy) Valentino Rossi	Grand Prix motorcycling	2013–2021		
(United Kingdom) Lewis Hamilton	(Netherlands) Max Verstappen	Formula One	2017–present		
(France) Fabio Quartararo	(Italy) Francesco Bagnaia	Grand Prix motorcycling	2021–present		
(Italy) Francesco Bagnaia	(Spain) Jorge Martin	Grand Prix motorcycling	2023–present		
(Italy) Valentino Rossi	(Spain) Sete Gibernau	Grand Prix motorcycling	—		
(United States) Gary Bettenhausen	(United States) Larry Dickson	USAC Sprint Car Series; American Championship Car Racing	—		
(France) Pierre Gasly	(France) Esteban Ocon	Karting; Formula One	2009–present		
(Spain) Álvaro Bautista	(Turkey) Toprak Razgatlıoğlu	Superbike World Championship	2022–2025		
(United Kingdom) Jonathan Rea	(Turkey) Toprak Razgatlıoğlu	Superbike World Championship	2021–2025		
(France) Romain Grosjean	(United States) Santino Ferrucci	IndyCar	2024–present		
(United Kingdom) Lando Norris	(Netherlands) Max Verstappen	Formula One	2024–present		
(United Kingdom) Lando Norris	(Australia) Oscar Piastri	Formula One	2025		
(Italy) Kimi Antonelli	(United Kingdom) George Russell	Formula One	2026–present		
(United Kingdom) Lewis Hamilton	(Monaco) Charles Leclerc	Formula One	2026–present		

== Mountaineering and rock climbing ==
1st party	2nd party	Timespan	Article	Source
(France) Catherine Destivelle	(United States) Lynn Hill	1985–1990		

== Netball ==
1st party	2nd party	Timespan	Article	Source
(Australia) Australian Netball Diamonds	New Zealand Silver Ferns	1963–, especially 1996–present		

== Rugby league ==
=== Australia ===
==== National Rugby League ====
1st party	2nd party	Timespan	Article	Source
South Sydney Rabbitohs	Sydney Roosters	1908 to present	Ron Coote Cup	
Sydney Roosters	Manly Warringah Sea Eagles	1947 to present	Battle of the Birds	
Penrith Panthers	Parramatta Eels	1967 to present	Battle of the West	
Manly-Warringah Sea Eagles	Wests Tigers	1970s to present		
Canterbury-Bankstown Bulldogs	Parramatta Eels	1970s to present		
Newcastle Knights	Manly Warringah Sea Eagles	1988 to present		
Canberra Raiders	Wests Tigers	1989 to present		
Brisbane Broncos	North Queensland Cowboys	1995 to present	Queensland derby	
Melbourne Storm	St. George Illawarra Dragons	1999 to present		
Sydney Roosters	St. George Illawarra Dragons	2002 to present	ANZAC Day Cup	
Melbourne Storm	Brisbane Broncos	2003 to present		
Brisbane Broncos	Gold Coast Titans	2007 to present	South East Queensland derby	
Melbourne Storm	Manly-Warringah Sea Eagles	2007 to present	Battle of Brookvale	
Canterbury-Bankstown Bulldogs	South Sydney Rabbitohs	2012 to present	NRL Good Friday Game	
Melbourne Storm	Cronulla-Sutherland Sharks	2016 to present		

==== State of Origin ====
1st party	2nd party	Timespan	Article	Source
Queensland Maroons	New South Wales Blues	First Rivalry Era 1908 to 1979, Modern Rivalry Era 1980 to present		

=== International Rugby League ===
1st party	2nd party	Timespan	Article	Source
Australia	New Zealand	1908 to present	Australia vs New Zealand in rugby league	
Australia	(United Kingdom) Great Britain / England	1907 to present	Australia–England rugby league rivalry	
New Zealand	(United Kingdom) Great Britain / England	1908 to present		

=== Individual ===
1st party	2nd party	Timespan	Article	Source
Mark Carroll	Paul Harragon		—	
Brad Fittler	Andrew Johns		—	
Andrew Johns	Brett Kimmorley		—	
Wendell Sailor	Adam MacDougall		—	
Benji Marshall	Johnathan Thurston		—	
Paul Gallen	Nate Myles		—	
Sam Burgess	James Graham		—	

== Rugby union ==
=== Club Rugby Union ===
==== Australia ====
1st party	2nd party	Timespan	Derby name	Source
Queensland Reds	New South Wales Waratahs	1882–present	East Coast Derby	

==== Argentina ====
1st party	2nd party	Timespan	Derby name	Source
CASI	SIC	1935–present	El clasico de San Isidro	

==== Costa Rica ====
1st party	2nd party	Timespan	Derby name	Source
Stag San José	Universitarios Rugby Club	1980s–present	Superclasico	
Universitarios Rugby Club	Liceo CR Waikalas	2000s–present	Student Derby	

==== France ====
1st party	2nd party	Timespan	Derby name	Source
Racing 92	Stade Français	1892–present	Paris derby	
Stade Français	Stade Toulousain	1903–present	French Derby or Le derby des Stades	
Bayonne	Biarritz	1908–present	Basque derby	
Brive	Clermont	1927–present	Massif Central derby	
Perpignan	Béziers		Derby du Languedoc-Roussillon	

==== Ireland ====
1st party	2nd party	Timespan	Article	Source
Leinster	Munster	1875–present	History of rugby union matches between Leinster and Munster	
University College Dublin	Trinity College Dublin (DUFC)	1919–present	The Colours Match	

==== Italy ====
1st party	2nd party	Timespan	Derby name	Source
Benetton	Zebre	2012–present	Italian derby	
Rovigo	Petrarca	1948 –present	Derby of Italy	

==== Spain ====
1st party	2nd party	Timespan	Derby name	Source
VRAC	Rugby El Salvador	1988–present	Derbi vallisoletano	

==== South Africa ====
1st party	2nd party	Timespan	Derby name	Source
Bulls	Lions	–present	Jukskei Derby	
Ikey Tigers	Maties	1883–present	Grudge Match	

==== New Zealand ====
1st party	2nd party	Timespan	Derby name	Source
Blues	Crusaders	1996–present	El Clasico of New Zealand Rugby	
Blues	Chiefs	1996–present	Battle of the Bombays	
Blues	Hurricanes	1996–present		
Crusaders	Highlanders	1996–present	Southern Derby	
Auckland	Canterbury			
Auckland	North Harbour		Battle of the Bridge	
Auckland	Counties Manukau		Battle of the Bombays Part two	
Auckland	Waikato		Battle of the Bombays	
Canterbury	Tasman		Crusaders Derby	
Canterbury	Otago			
Otago	Southland		Southern Derby	

=== International Rugby Union ===
1st party	2nd party	Timespan	Article	Source
New Zealand All Blacks	South Africa Springboks	1921 to present	History of rugby union matches between New Zealand and South Africa	
New Zealand All Blacks	Australia Wallabies	1903 to present	History of rugby union matches between Australia and New Zealand; Bledisloe Cup	
New Zealand All Blacks	Wales	1905 to present	History of rugby union matches between New Zealand and Wales	
England	Wales	1881 to present	History of rugby union matches between England and Wales	
England	France	1906 to present	History of rugby union matches between England and France	
England	Scotland	1871 to present	History of rugby union matches between England and Scotland Calcutta Cup	
Australia Wallabies	South Africa Springboks	1933 to present	History of rugby union matches between Australia and South Africa	
Fiji	Samoa	1924 to present	History of rugby union matches between Fiji and Samoa	

== Sailing ==
1st party	2nd party	Timespan	Article	Source
Alinghi	BMW Oracle Racing	–2010	2010 America's Cup	
Ben Ainslie	Jonas Høgh-Christensen	–2012		

== Short-track speed skating ==
1st party	2nd party	Timespan	Article	Source
South Korea	China	—	—	

== Skiing ==
=== Alpine skiing ===
1st party	2nd party	Timespan	Article	Source
Austria	Switzerland	—	—	
(United States) Lindsey Vonn	(Germany) Maria Höfl-Riesch	–2014	—	
(Switzerland) Maria Walliser	(Switzerland) Michaela Figini	—	—	
(Luxembourg) Marc Girardelli	(Switzerland) Pirmin Zurbriggen	—	—	
(Croatia) Janica Kostelić	(Sweden) Anja Pärson	2001–2006	—	
(United States) Ted Ligety	(Austria) Marcel Hirscher	—	—	
(Germany) Katja Seizinger	(United States) Picabo Street	1992–1998	—	
(Austria) Renate Götschl	(Austria) Michaela Dorfmeister	—	—	
(Austria) Marcel Hirscher	(Norway) Henrik Kristoffersen	—	—	
(Norway) Aksel Lund Svindal	(Norway) Kjetil Jansrud	2015–2019	—	
(United States) Mikaela Shiffrin	(Slovakia) Petra Vlhová	2017–present	—	

=== Biathlon ===
1st party	2nd party	Timespan	Article	Source
(Norway) Emil Hegle Svendsen	(France) Martin Fourcade	—	—	
(Norway) Ole Einar Bjørndalen	(France) Raphaël Poirée	—	—	
(France) Martin Fourcade	(Norway) Johannes Thingnes Bø	2017–2020	—	

=== Cross-country skiing ===
1st party	2nd party	Timespan	Article	Source
Norway	Sweden	—	—	
(Norway) Marit Bjørgen	(Poland) Justyna Kowalczyk	—	—	
(Norway) Maiken Caspersen Falla	(Sweden) Stina Nilsson	—	—	

=== Ski jumping ===
1st party	2nd party	Timespan	Article	Source
(Poland) Adam Małysz	(Finland) Janne Ahonen	2002–2008	—	
(Poland) Adam Małysz	(Germany) Martin Schmitt	2001–2011	—	

== Motorcycle Speedway ==
=== Scotland ===
- Scottish Speedway Derby: Edinburgh Monarchs vs. Glasgow Tigers

== Surfing ==
1st party	2nd party	Timespan	Article	Source
(United States) Kelly Slater	(United States) Andy Irons	2002–2010		
(United States) Tom Curren	(Australia) Mark Occhilupo	—		

== Swimming ==
1st party	2nd party	Timespan	Article	Source
Swimming Australia	(United States) USA Swimming	2000–present	Duel in the Pool	
(United Kingdom) Eleanor Simmonds	(United States) Victoria Arlen	2012–present		
(United States) Michael Phelps	(United States) Ryan Lochte	2004–2016		
(Russia) Alexander Popov	(United States) Gary Hall Jr.	1996		
(Japan) Kosuke Kitajima	(United States) Brendan Hansen	2001–present		
(Australia) Leisel Jones	(United States) Rebecca Soni	2008		
(United States) Shirley Babashoff	(East Germany) East German swimming team	1976		
(United States) Michael Phelps (United States) Ryan Lochte	(United States) Tyler Clary	2008–present		
(United States) Michael Phelps	(Serbia) Milorad Čavić	2008–2012		
(South Africa) Cameron van der Burgh	(United Kingdom) Adam Peaty	2014–present		
(United States) Michael Phelps	(South Africa) Chad le Clos	2012, 2014–present		

== Tennis (Open era only) ==
1st party	2nd party	Timespan	Article	Source
(Serbia) Novak Djokovic	(Spain) Rafael Nadal	2006–2024	Djokovic–Nadal rivalry	
(Switzerland) Roger Federer	(Spain) Rafael Nadal	2004–2019	Federer–Nadal rivalry	
(Serbia) Novak Djokovic	(Switzerland) Roger Federer	2006–2020	Djokovic–Federer rivalry	
(United States) Andre Agassi	(United States) Pete Sampras	1989–2002	Agassi–Sampras rivalry	
(Sweden) Björn Borg	(United States) John McEnroe	1978–1981	Borg–McEnroe rivalry	
(Czechoslovakia) Ivan Lendl	(United States) John McEnroe	1980–1992	Lendl–McEnroe rivalry	
(United States) Jimmy Connors	(Czechoslovakia) Ivan Lendl	1979–1992	Connors–Lendl rivalry	
(United States) Jimmy Connors	(United States) John McEnroe	1977–1991	Connors–McEnroe rivalry	
(Germany) Steffi Graf	(Socialist Federal Republic of Yugoslavia) / (Federal Republic of Yugoslavia) / (United States) Monica Seles	1989–1999	Graf–Seles rivalry	
(United States) Chris Evert	(Czechoslovakia) / (United States) Martina Navratilova	1975–1988	Evert–Navratilova rivalry	
(Australia) Margaret Court	(United States) Billie Jean King	1962–1973		
(Germany) Steffi Graf	(Czechoslovakia) / (United States) Martina Navratilova	1985–1994	Graf–Navratilova rivalry	
(United States) Chris Evert	(Australia) Evonne Goolagong Cawley	1972–1983		
(United States) Serena Williams	(United States) Venus Williams	1998–2020	Williams sisters rivalry	
(Belgium) Kim Clijsters	(Belgium) Justine Henin	1998–2010	Clijsters–Henin rivalry	
(Germany) Steffi Graf	(Argentina) Gabriela Sabatini	1985–1995	Graf–Sabatini rivalry	
(Switzerland) Martina Hingis	(United States) Venus Williams	1997–2006	Hingis–V. Williams rivalry	
(United States) Lindsay Davenport	(United States) Venus Williams	1997–2005		
(Germany) Steffi Graf	(Spain) Arantxa Sánchez Vicario	1988–1996		
(Serbia) Novak Djokovic	(United Kingdom) Andy Murray	2006–2017	Djokovic–Murray rivalry	
(Australia) Rod Laver	(Australia) Ken Rosewall	1968–1976		
(United Kingdom) Andy Murray	(Spain) Rafael Nadal	2007–2016	Murray–Nadal rivalry	
(Switzerland) Roger Federer	(United Kingdom) Andy Murray	2005–2015	Federer–Murray rivalry	

== Volleyball ==
=== Croatia ===
- Zagreb vs. Kaštela

=== Libya ===
- Misurata derby: Al-Sweihli vs. Al-Etihad Misurata

=== Philippines ===
- F2 Logistics Cargo Movers vs. Petron Blaze Spikers (defunct)
- BaliPure Purest Water Defenders vs. Pocari Sweat Lady Warriors (defunct)
- Creamline Cool Smashers vs. Petro Gazz Angels (rivalry; defunct)
- Choco Mucho Flying Titans vs. Creamline Cool Smashers (rivalry)

=== South Korea ===
- V-Classic match: Daejeon Samsung Fire Bluefangs vs. Cheonan Hyundai Capital Skywalkers

=== Turkey ===
- Eczacıbaşı vs. VakıfBank S.K.

=== Vietnam ===
- Bộ Tư lệnh Thông tin – FLC vs. VTV Bình Điền Long An

== See also ==
- Association football culture
- Nationalism and sport
- Politics and sports
- Sociology of sport
