= Dominican Republic–Venezuela baseball rivalry =

International baseball rivalry

- Other names: Clásico de titanes Clásico de Latinoamericano
- Location: International
- Teams: Dominican Republic; Venezuela
- First meeting: March 7, 2006; Dominican Republic 11–5 Venezuela (World Baseball Classic, Orlando)
- Latest meeting: March 11, 2026; Dominican Republic 7–5 Venezuela (World Baseball Classic, in Miami)

Statistics
- Total meetings: 6
- Most player appearances: Miguel Cabrera (VEN) / Robinson Canó (DOM) (5 World Baseball Classic tournaments)
- Top scorer: Most home runs Miguel Cabrera (VEN) (7 career WBC home runs)
- All-time series: World Baseball Classic; 5–1, Dominican Republic
- Location of Santo Domingo (top) and Caracas (bottom) in the Caribbean

The Dominican Republic–Venezuela baseball rivalry, also widely referred to in Spanish-language media as the Clásico de titanes, Clásico de Latinoamericano(Spanish language), is a major international sports rivalry between the Dominican Republic and Venezuela.

As the premier powerhouses and primary exporters of Major League Baseball talent in Latin America, their matchups are celebrated as some of the fiercest in international baseball. The rivalry is defined by highly charged showdowns in regional tournaments like the Caribbean Series and key pool-play fixtures during the World Baseball Classic.

== See also ==
- El Clásico del Clasico (Baseball)
- Japan–South Korea baseball rivalry
