= Japan–South Korea baseball rivalry =

International baseball rivalry

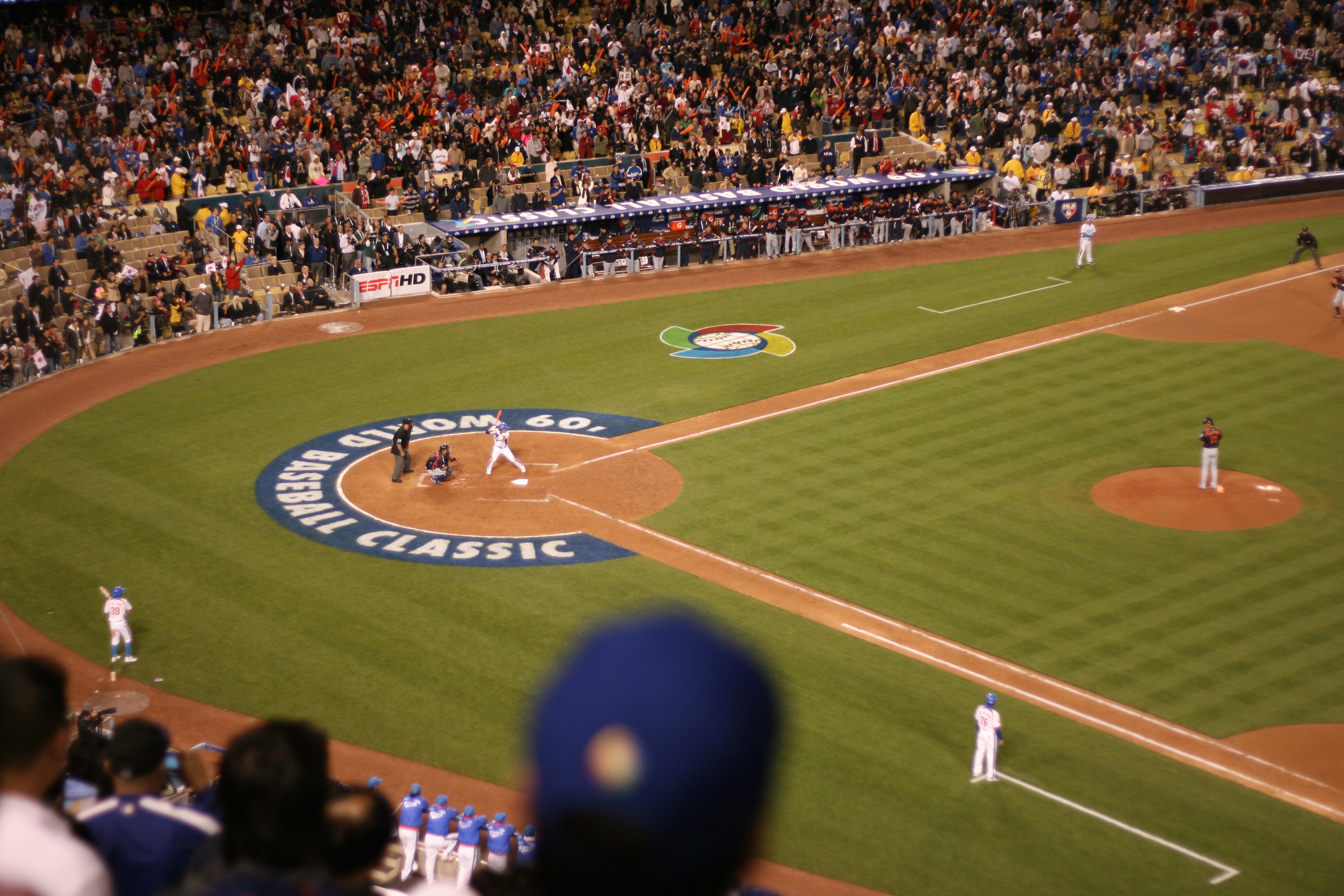
- The final of the 2009 WBC was played between Japan and South Korea
- Location: Asia (WBSC Asia)
- Teams: Japan; South Korea
- First meeting: December 18, 1954; Japan 6–0 South Korea (Asian Baseball Championship, Manila)
- Latest meeting: March 7, 2026; South Korea 6–8 Japan (World Baseball Classic, in Tokyo)

Statistics
- All-time series: World Baseball Classic; 6–4, Japan

The Japan–South Korea baseball rivalry is a sports rivalry contested between the national baseball teams of Japan and South Korea. One of many rivalries between the two East Asian countries, the two teams met officially at the 1954 Asian Baseball Championship and have contested several high-profile games since, including several Summer Olympics and the final of the 2009 World Baseball Classic. The two teams are considered "arch-rivals", and the competition is one of the fiercest in international baseball.

== Background ==
The baseball rivalry between Japan and South Korea is rooted in the historically contentious relationship between the two countries; Japan occupied the Korean peninsula until the end of World War II. The Republic of Korea gained its independence shortly thereafter. However, diplomatic relations between the two countries would not be normalized until 1965, and even this was only accomplished after the suppression of public opposition in South Korea.

Even though baseball originated in both countries independently from each other, the sport's evolution in each country was affected by the other. For much of the 20th century, Korean players were prominent in Japan's professional leagues (including Isao Harimoto, a Zainichi Korean inducted into the Japanese Baseball Hall of Fame). However, during the Japanese occupation, baseball was restricted on the Korean peninsula, and Korean players were only allowed to play in tournaments sponsored by Japanese companies. In this way, baseball also became a means of promoting Korean nationalism.

South Korea and Japan were two of the four founding members of the Baseball Federation of Asia in 1954. The two countries met for the first time later that year, when the Asian Baseball Championship was inaugurated in Manila. In the first game of the inaugural Asian baseball tournament, Korea suffered a 0–6 shutout to Samurai Japan. Korea won its first victory in the rivalry nine years later, defeating Japan 5–2 at the 1963 Asian Baseball Championship in Seoul.

== History ==
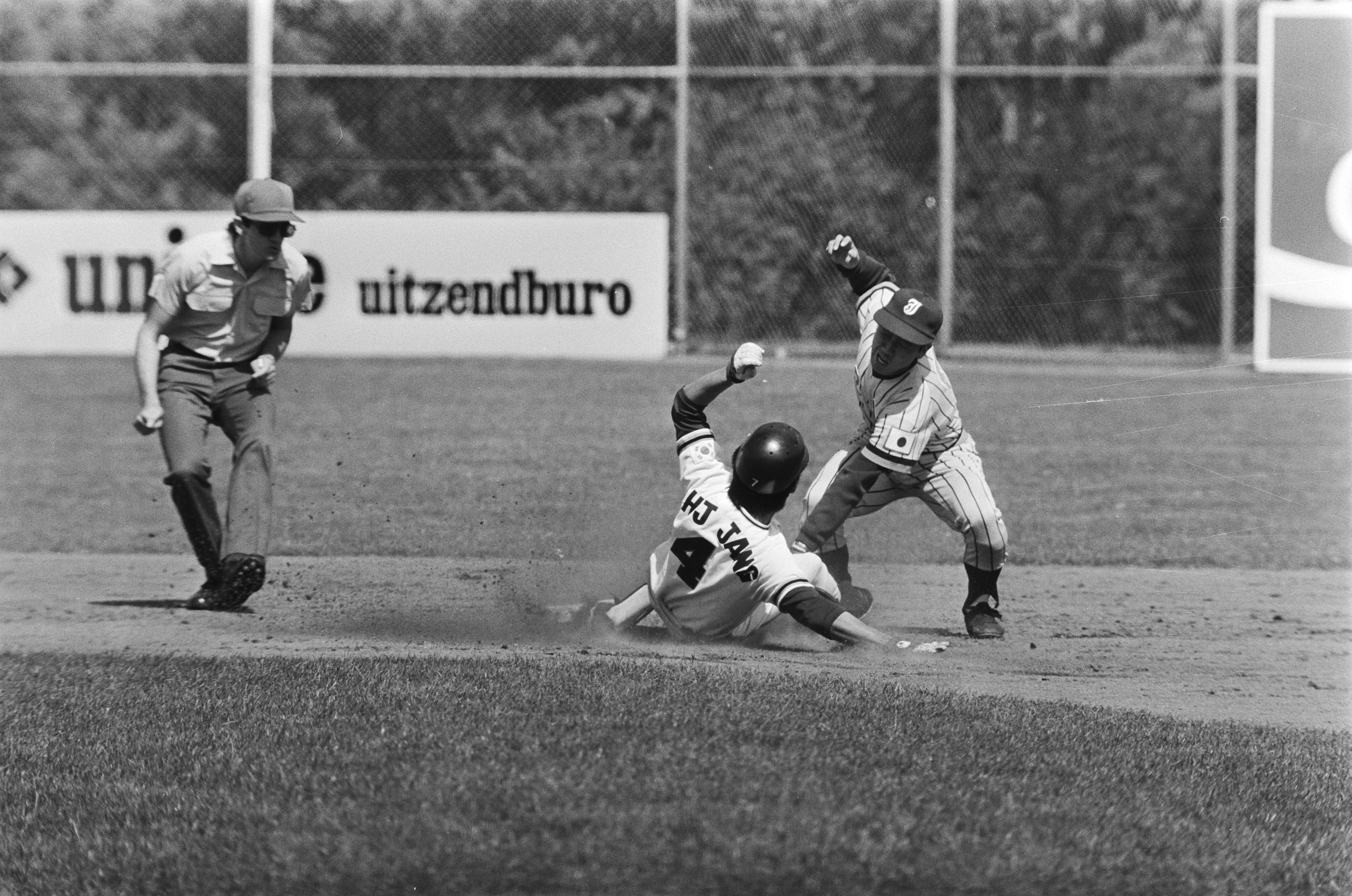
Jang Hyo-jo tagged out against Japan at the 1978 Haarlem Baseball Week

One of South Korea's most dramatic victories over its neighbor took place at the 1982 Baseball World Cup, held at Jamsil Baseball Stadium in Seoul. Trailing 0–2 in the bottom of the eighth, Kim Jae-bak hit a three-run homer off the foul pole, making South Korea the first Asian country to win the amateur baseball competition.

In the early 2000s, South Korea was considered by some to be a "rising power" in baseball, especially compared to more established baseball powerhouses like Japan. Some have pointed to the 2000 Summer Olympics in Sydney as the modern emergence of the rivalry, as South Korea beat Japan to win the bronze medal.

Before the inaugural 2006 World Baseball Classic, Japan's Ichiro Suzuki made several controversial comments about South Korea, claiming that the country "smells like garlic." He added that he wanted to beat South Korea bad enough to "make them see that they won't beat Japan for the next 30 years." South Korea responded by twice beating Japan, and Korean pitcher Jae Weong Seo planted two Korean flags on the mound while a visibly-angry Ichiro looked on. An editorial in the JoonAng Daily described Korea's run against Japan as "the most triumphant event in the 101 years of Korean baseball history." Despite Korea's perfect 3–0 in pool play, they were ultimately defeated by Japan 6–0 in a third, semifinal matchup; Japan moved on to take the championship game over Cuba.

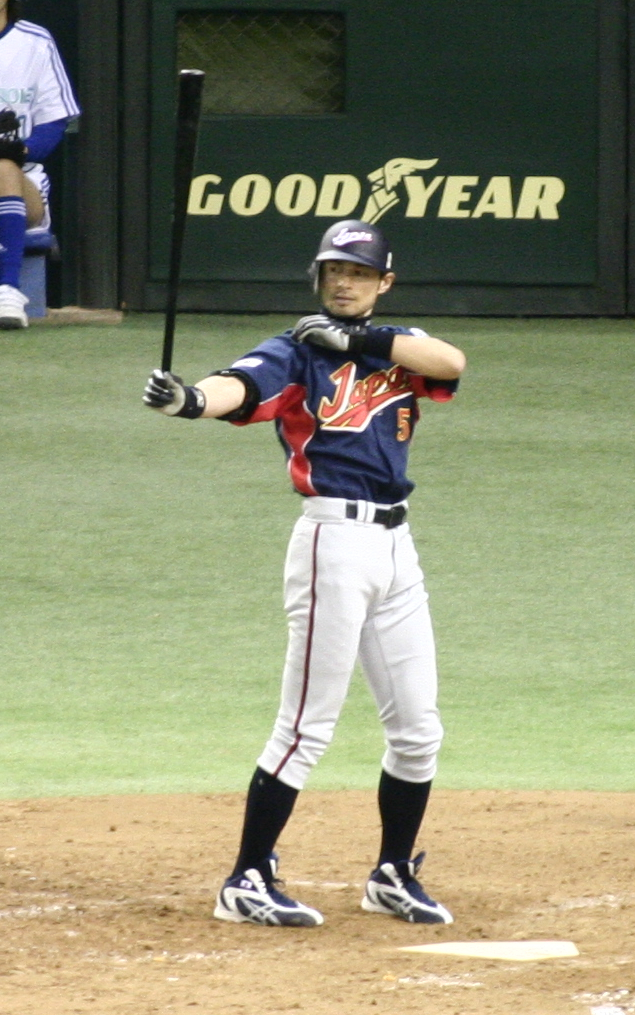
Ichiro Suzuki

At the 2006 Asian Games in Doha, South Korea suffered bitter defeats in three major professional sports: association football, basketball, and baseball. The Korean baseball team, with expectations of a third consecutive gold medal, lost to a Japanese team composed mainly of amateur players. The Korean press labelled the incident "the Doha tragedy". Nevertheless, South Korea cemented their position with a gold medal finish at the 2008 Olympics in Beijing, while Japan finished a disappointing fourth despite sending many top players from NPB.

Going into the 2009 World Baseball Classic, both Japan and South Korea were considered among the tournament favorites. Ichiro again courted controversy in the build-up to the 2009 tournament, making comments suggesting that the Koreans, with their "big bodies", played "American-style baseball" rather than "Japanese baseball", which some regarded as racially-charged. South Korea's Jung Bong pushed back on these comments, arguing that the Korean team was "not even all that big physically," but that its "level of focus and team unity is definitely better than Japan's." South Korea and Japan met in the final game of the tournament at Dodger Stadium. The Korean team managed a late-innings rally to tie the game with Samurai Japan, but Ichiro lined a two-out, two-strike single off of Korea's Chang-yong Lim — who had been directed not to pitch to Ichiro — in the 10th inning to drive in the winning runs.

Japan and Korea did not meet in the 2013 World Baseball Classic, as they were assigned to different pools; South Korea was eliminated in the first round, while Japan lost to Puerto Rico in the championship round. Instead, their next high-profile meeting was in the semifinals of the inaugural WBSC Premier12 tournament in 2015. Before a sold-out crowd at the Tokyo Dome, Samurai Japan starter Shohei Ohtani took a no-hitter into the seventh inning, but Korea scored four runs in the ninth to rally past top-ranked Japan with a final score of 4–3.

At the 2019 WBSC Premier12, Japan defeated South Korea 10–8 in the Super Round and 5–3 in the final to win the championship.

Japan hosted the 2020 Summer Olympics in Tokyo, adding baseball to the games for the first time since 2008. The tournament, delayed to 2021 and played behind closed doors due to the COVID-19 pandemic, saw South Korea and Japan meet in the semifinal round. Japan bested South Korea 5–2, though the game was marred by a controversial safe call on Kensuke Kondoh, who South Korea argued missed touching first base. The safe call, confirmed by replay review, allowed a rally that ended in a Tetsuto Yamada bases-clearing double, sending Japan to the gold medal game (which they eventually won over Team USA).

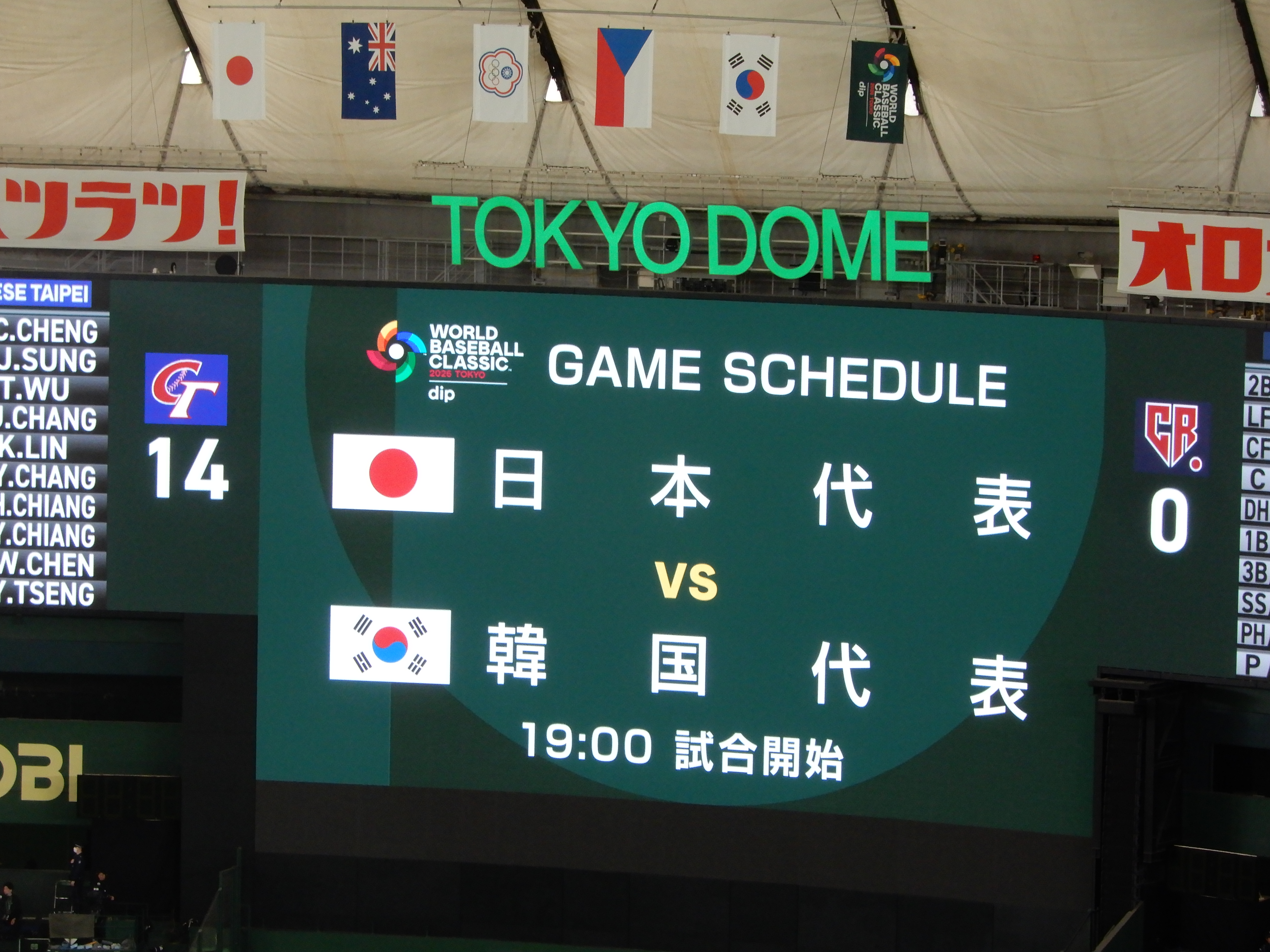
Scoreboard before the Korea vs. Japan game at the 2026 World Baseball Classic.

South Korea and Japan met again in the pool stage of the 2023 World Baseball Classic, hosted at the Tokyo Dome. When the two teams met, Japan defeated South Korea 13–4, as Korea's bullpen fell apart in the middle innings.

As of the 2026 World Baseball Classic, South Korea has not recorded a victory over Japan in games between national teams composed of professional players since defeating Japan and winning the 2015 WBSC Premier12. From the 2017 APBC Asia Professional Baseball Championship through the 2026 World Baseball Classic, South Korea recorded one draw and 11 losses against Japan.

== Results ==
Results from tournaments primarily composed of amateur players are omitted. The table below lists Japan–South Korea games between national teams composed of professional baseball players, beginning with the 2006 World Baseball Classic, the first major international tournament to feature widespread participation by Major League Baseball players.

Date	City	Venue	Winner	Score	Inn.	Competition	Game duration	Attendance	Boxscore
March 5, 2006	Tokyo	Tokyo Dome	South Korea	3–2		2006 World Baseball Classic	3:02	40,353	Boxscore
March 15, 2006	Anaheim	Angel Stadium	South Korea	2–1		2006 World Baseball Classic	2:44	39,679	Boxscore
March 18, 2006	San Diego	Petco Park	Japan	6–0		2006 World Baseball Classic	2:40	42,639	Boxscore
December 2, 2007	Taichung	Taichung Intercontinental Baseball Stadium	Japan	4–3		2008 Summer Olympics Qualification			
August 16, 2008	Beijing	Wukesong Baseball Main Field	South Korea	5–3		2008 Summer Olympics			
August 22, 2008	Beijing	Wukesong Baseball Main Field	South Korea	6–2		2008 Summer Olympics			
March 7, 2009	Tokyo	Tokyo Dome	Japan	14–2	7	2009 World Baseball Classic	2:48	45,640	Boxscore
March 9, 2009	Tokyo	Tokyo Dome	South Korea	1–0		2009 World Baseball Classic	3:02	42,879	Boxscore
March 17, 2009	San Diego	Petco Park	South Korea	4–1		2009 World Baseball Classic	3:21	15,332	Boxscore
March 19, 2009	San Diego	Petco Park	Japan	6–2		2009 World Baseball Classic	3:42	14,832	Boxscore
March 23, 2009	Los Angeles	Dodger Stadium	Japan	5–3	10	2009 World Baseball Classic (final)	4:00	54,846	Boxscore
November 8, 2015	Sapporo	Sapporo Dome	Japan	5–0		2015 WBSC Premier12	3:37	28,848	Boxscore
November 19, 2015	Tokyo	Tokyo Dome	South Korea	4–3		2015 WBSC Premier12	3:50	40,258	Boxscore
November 16, 2017	Tokyo	Tokyo Dome	Japan	8–7		2017 Asia Professional Baseball Championship	4:29	32,815	Boxscore
November 19, 2017	Tokyo	Tokyo Dome	Japan	7–0		2017 Asia Professional Baseball Championship (final)	3:29	30,498	Boxscore
November 16, 2019	Tokyo	Tokyo Dome	Japan	10–8		2019 WBSC Premier12	3:40	44,224	Boxscore
November 17, 2019	Tokyo	Tokyo Dome	Japan	5–3		2019 WBSC Premier12 (final)	3:00	44,960	Boxscore
August 4, 2021	Yokohama	Yokohama Stadium	Japan	5–2		2020 Summer Olympics			Boxscore
March 10, 2023	Tokyo	Tokyo Dome	Japan	13–4		2023 World Baseball Classic	4:04	41,629	Boxscore
November 17, 2023	Tokyo	Tokyo Dome	Japan	2–1		2023 Asia Professional Baseball Championship	2:43	35,223	Boxscore
December 19, 2023	Tokyo	Tokyo Dome	Japan	4–3	10	2023 Asia Professional Baseball Championship (final)	3:50	41,883	Boxscore
November 15, 2024	Taipei	Taipei Dome	Japan	6–3		2024 WBSC Premier12	3:31	20,028	Boxscore
November 15, 2025	Tokyo	Tokyo Dome	Japan	11–4		Friendly	3:15	41,631	Boxscore
November 16, 2025	Tokyo	Tokyo Dome	Tie	7–7		Friendly	3:34	41,627	Boxscore
March 7, 2026	Tokyo	Tokyo Dome	Japan	8–6		2026 World Baseball Classic	3:04	42,318	Boxscore

== See also ==
- KBO–NPB Club Championship
- Japan–South Korea football rivalry
- El Clásico del Clasico (Baseball)
