= KBO–NPB Club Championship =

The NPB–KBO Club Championship was contested between the champions of Nippon Professional Baseball's Japan Series, and the Korea Baseball Organization's Korean Series. The Korean teams lost to Japan in both matches of 2009 and 2010.

== Game results ==
| Year | Host | Winner | Score | Runner-up |
|---|---|---|---|---|
| 2009; Detail | Japan; Nagasaki | (Japan) Yomiuri Giants | 9 – 4 | (South Korea) Kia Tigers |
| 2010; Detail | Japan; Tokyo | (Japan) Chiba Lotte Marines | 3 – 0 | (South Korea) SK Wyverns |

== See also ==
- Asia Series
- CPBL–KBO Club Championship
- Korean Series
- Japan Series
