= CPBL–KBO Club Championship =

The CPBL–KBO Club Championship was contested between the champions of Chinese Professional Baseball League's Taiwan Series, and the Korea Baseball Organization's Korean Series.

== Game results ==
Year	Host	Team 1	Score	Team 2
2010; Detail	Taiwan Taichung	(Taiwan) Brother Elephants	3 - 2 (Game 1); 2 - 5 (Game 2)	(South Korea) SK Wyverns
