= Australia–England sports rivalries =

Australia–England relations
- Australia: England

The England–Australia sporting rivalry is one which spreads across multiple sports and can be traced back as far as 1868.

== History ==
It is believed that the initial trigger of the Australia-England sporting rivalry began with an insulting article written in a local British newspaper in the 19th century. "Nothing of interest comes from Australia except gold and black cricketers", proclaimed the British Daily Telegraph in 1868 with a mixture of colonial arrogance and paternal intrigue. England and Australia are considered two of the top sporting nations in the world, and frequently compete for the position of second greatest sporting nation in the world after the United States.

== Commonwealth Games ==
Australia and England have topped the medal tally in every edition of the Commonwealth Games, with the exception of the 1978 Commonwealth Games where home nation Canada came out victorious. As of 2017, Australia has won the most Commonwealth Games gold medals with 852 and England sits second on the table with 669 gold medals.

== Association football ==
Association football is the national sport in England. The Premier League is widely considered to be one of the strongest and most popular football competitions in the world. Conversely, Association football in Australia is often referred to as "soccer" and the domestic A-League competition is considered to be one of the minor professional leagues in the country. Despite the major gulf in interest, the Australian national team is very popular which has seen a rivalry develop with the English national team. The two nations first played each other in 1980, which saw England defeat Australia 2–1 at the Sydney Cricket Ground. The two teams played each other another four times in the 1980s and 1990s which resulted in English victories or draws.

After 12 years of absence, Australia and England scheduled a friendly match at Upton Park, London on 12 February 2003. The English were strong favourites going into the match as they fielded a near World Cup strength team while Australia failed to qualify for the 2002 FIFA World Cup after losing their fourth FIFA World Cup inter-confederation play-off in Uruguay. Despite entering the clash as the heavy underdogs, Australia pulled off a stunning upset over England with a 3–1 victory. Trailing 2-0 at halftime, England coach Sven-Göran Eriksson decided to field a vastly different team in the second half which included the international debuts of Jermaine Jenas, Paul Robinson, Wayne Rooney, James Beattie, Paul Konchesky and Francis Jeffers (who scored in his only international match); Vince Grella made his international debut for Australia in the match as well.

On 4 March 2016, it was announced that the Stadium of Light would host England for a friendly against Australia on 27 May 2016 as part of their preparations for Euro 2016. The sold-out match finished in a 2–1 victory for England, with goals from Marcus Rashford (on his international debut), Wayne Rooney (who made his debut against Australia in 2003) and an own goal from Eric Dier.

On 16 August 2023, the two nations faced each other in the FIFA Women's World Cup semifinal with England winning 3-1 to reach the FIFA Women's World Cup Final for the first time in their history.

== Cricket ==
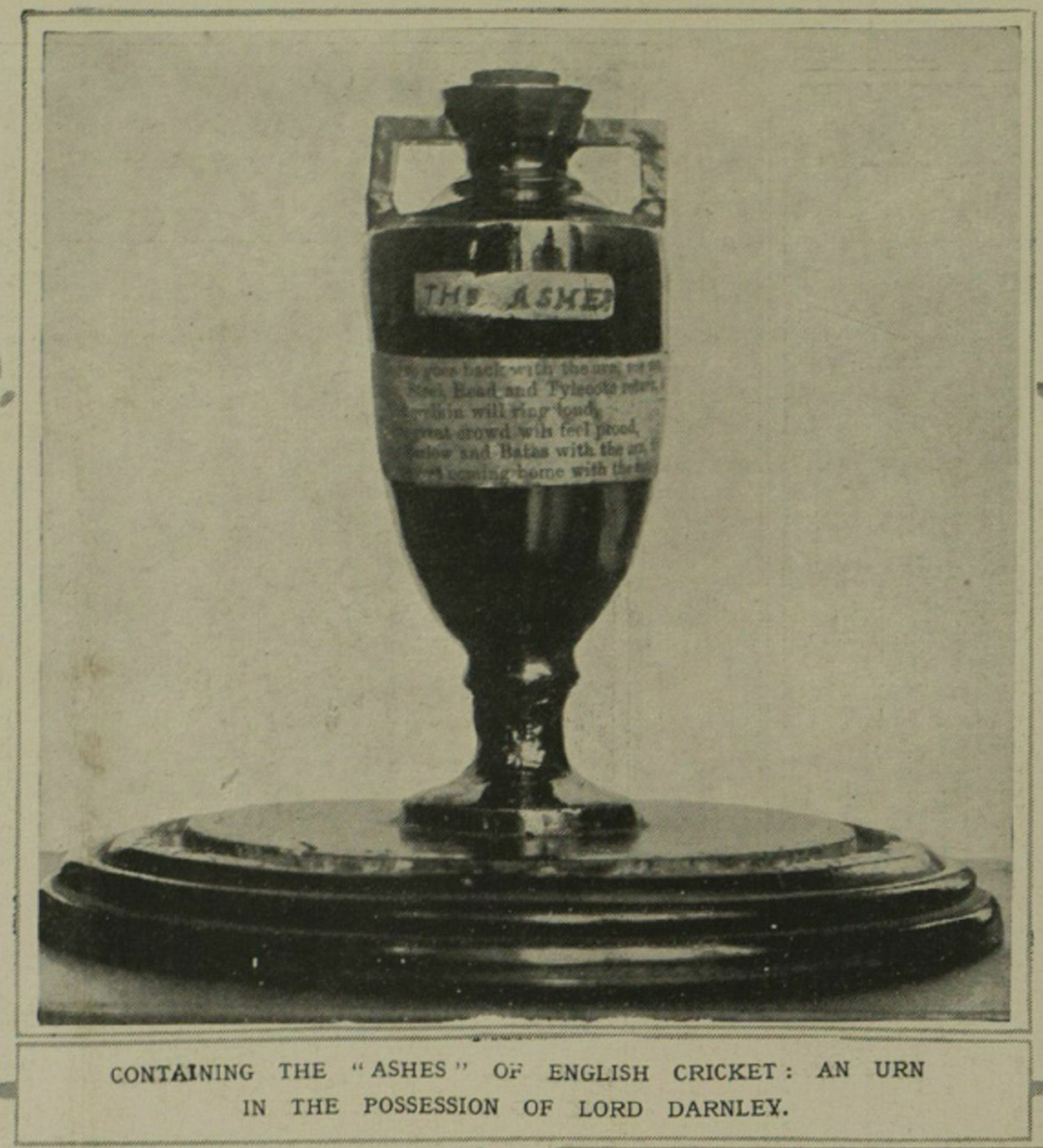
The earliest published photo of the Ashes urn, from The Illustrated London News, 1921

Many sports analysts consider a Test cricket competition referred to as The Ashes to be the most intense form of all sporting rivalries involving the two nations. The competition is officially contested between Australia and England but the three nations of England, Scotland and Wales competed under the English flag up until 1992 when the Scots began to compete independently. Welsh cricket players continue to compete for England with Simon Jones being a recent example of a Welsh player competing for England in the 2005 Ashes series. The first Ashes series was contested in 1884.

Following England's home Test defeat in 1882, English journalist Reginald Shirley Brooks wrote a mock obituary for The Sporting Times that notified the public of English cricket's death and stated "The body and contents will be cremated and the ashes sent to Australia". Later that year, during England's 1882-83 tour of Australia, English captain Ivo Bligh declared he would "recover those ashes" and received a miniature urn which is believed to contain the ashes of a burnt bail.

Bodyline was a tactic developed by the English cricket team for the 1932–33 Ashes tour of Australia, specifically to combat the extraordinary batting skill of Australia's Donald Bradman. England's use of a tactic perceived by some as overly aggressive or even unfair ultimately threatened diplomatic relations between the two countries before the situation was calmed. A bodyline delivery was one where the cricket ball was bowled at the body of the batsman, in the hope that when he defended himself with his bat, a resulting deflection could be caught by one of several fielders standing close by. This was considered by critics to be intimidatory and physically threatening, to the point of being unfair in a game that was supposed to uphold gentlemanly traditions.

During the post World War 2 Era, the matches would typically be a five-game series every four years with the locations rotating. For example, Australia hosted in 1994-95, England in 1997, Australia in 1998-99 and England in 2001. Australia has a slight edge on England with Australia leading the series 130-106.

Australia has not lost a series game between 1989-2002/03. This is in part due to the number of successful players that have come out of Australia with the likes of Glenn McGrath, Ricky Ponting, Shane Warne, Adam Gilcrist, and Matthew Hayden.

The match returned in 2017. It was played in Brisbane, Australia on November 23. It featured the likes of players such as Joe Root and Steve Smith.

On 9 June 2013, Australian David Warner infamously punched English batsman Joe Root inside Birmingham's Walkabout Pub. The incident was believed to have been triggered by Root's decision to wear an Australian wig around his chin in a manner that was perceived by Warner to have been a racial taunt. Warner was subsequently temporarily banished from the Australian national team and applied a self-imposed alcohol ban.

The two nations have also met in other important cricket fixtures that weren't played at the Test level. Recent examples being the 2019 ICC Cricket World Cup semi-final, which England won by eight wickets and 2010 ICC World Twenty20 final, which England won by 7 wickets.

== Golf ==
One of golf's greatest rivalries played out in the 1990s between Australian Greg Norman and Englishman Nick Faldo.

== Mixed Martial Arts ==
In May 2012, it was announced that the upcoming series of The Ultimate Fighter would see UK fighters pitted against Australian fighters in what was labeled The Smashes, a play on the 130 year-old cricket rivalry between England and Australia called The Ashes. The casting call was for Lightweight and Welterweight fighters who were at least 21 years old and had a minimum of two wins in three professional fights. Australia's Robert Whittaker came out victorious in the Welterweight tournament with a unanimous decision victory over Englishman Brad Scott in the tournament final.

Whittaker would once again stir up the rivalry in July 2017 after capturing the interim UFC Middleweight Championship. In a post-fight interview, he told champion and Englishman Michael Bisping it was "fate" that they would be fighting for the championship. In response, Bisping would storm into the Octagon and tell Whittaker that he was "disgusted" with Whittaker's interim belt and that he should be ashamed for pretending he was a real champion. The fight between the two never eventuated.

== Rugby league ==
The two nations have met in the final of the Rugby League World Cup three times, with Australia winning all of their meetings.

== Rugby union ==
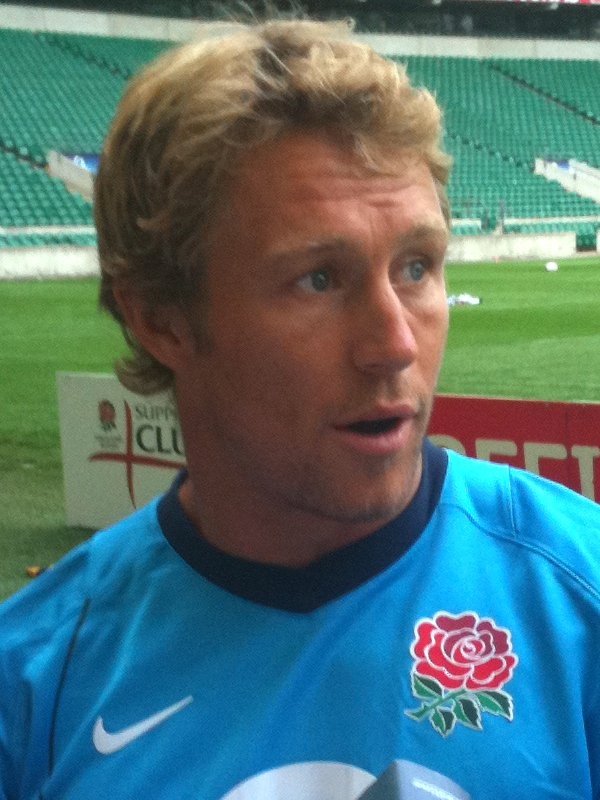
Johnny Wilkinson kicked the winning drop goal in extra time of the 2003 Rugby World Cup Final.

The Australian and English national rugby union teams first met in 1909 at Blackheath with the Australians coming out victorious 9–3. The win was considered something of a black eye at the time in a sport that epitomised a militaristic public schooled sense of athletic rectitude, and was dismissed as a product of outrageous good fortune in the English press, with the Manchester Guardian saying the Aussies' "nippiness and grit got them through, but their football... was rarely removed from the commonplace".

The Battle of Ballymore between Australia and a majority-English British and Irish Lions in 1989 was described by Mike Teague, who played in it, as "the most violent game of rugby that has ever been played".

The two nations met in the 2003 Rugby World Cup Final with England at the top of the world rankings and the Australians not having lost a World Cup match in eight years leading into the match. Despite having home advantage, Australia would lose the final by three points in extra time as Englishman Jonny Wilkinson nailed a drop goal with 26 seconds remaining to break Australian hearts.

The ledger between the two nations stands at 28 wins for England, 27 wins for Australia and one drawn match.

== Tennis ==
The two teams, then known as Australasia and the British Isles, played off in the 1907 Davis Cup final. Australia would win the encounter 3-2 and in doing so captured their first ever Davis Cup title. The most recent Davis Cup meeting between the two nations took place at the 2015 Davis Cup semifinals. Great Britain, led by Scot Andy Murray, defeated Australia 3-2 in Glasgow and sealed their first finals appearance in 37 years. The Davis Cup ledger stands at 8-5 in Australia's favour.

Outside of Davis Cup, countrymen of the two nations have competed in many Grand Slam finals with the most recent meeting occurring at the 1997 US Open Men's Final. Australian Patrick Rafter defeated Brit Greg Rusedski 6–3, 6–2, 4–6, 7–5 to capture the 1997 US Open Championship. Another notable meeting between countrymen of the two nations played out in a 2002 Wimbledon semifinal between Australian Lleyton Hewitt and Englishman Tim Henman. Henman, who had reached the Wimbledon semifinals three of the previous four Championships, was considered Britain's best chance to break their 66-year drought at Wimbledon and received enormous coverage leading into the clash with Hewitt. Despite the vocal crowd in attendance, Hewitt defeated Henman and went on to claim the Wimbledon title with a straight sets victory in the final.

== Supporters ==
=== Barmy Army ===
The Barmy Army is a semi-organised group of English cricket fans which arranges touring parties for some of its members to follow the English cricket team on overseas tours. The name is also applied to followers of the team who join in with match day activities in the crowd, but do not necessarily travel as part of an organised tour. The group was given its name by the Australian media during the 1994 - 1995 Test series in Australia, reportedly for the fans' audacity in travelling to Australia in the near-certain knowledge that their team would lose, and the fact that they kept on chanting even when England were losing quite badly.

=== Fanatics ===
Fanatics officially began in 1997 with the aim of forming an organised, passionate & patriotic support group that would follow Australian Sport at home & around the world.
