= Hingis–V. Williams rivalry =

Tennis rivalry

The Hingis–V. Williams rivalry was a tennis rivalry between Martina Hingis and Venus Williams, who met 21 times during their careers. Their overall head-to-head was 11–10 in Hingis' favor. Their rivalry was one of the best in women's sports and has been called a "rivalry for the ages".

== Head-to-head ==
Legend	Hingis	Williams
Grand Slam	4	2
WTA Tour Championships	1	0
WTA Tier I	4	4
WTA Tier II	2	3
Grand Slam Cup	0	1
Total	11	10

=== Singles ===
Martina Hingis–Venus Williams (11–10)

No.	Year	Tournament	Tier	Surface	Round	Winner	Score	Length	Sets	Hingis	Williams
1.	1997	(United States) Miami Open	Tier I	Hard	Round of 32	Hingis	6–4, 6–2	1:09	2/3	1	0
2.	1997	(United States) Southern California Open	Tier II	Hard	Round of 16	Hingis	6–2, 6–1	0:50	2/3	2	0
3.	1997	(United States) US Open	Major	Hard	Final	Hingis	6–0, 6–4	1:02	2/3	3	0
4.	1998	(Australia) Sydney International	Tier II	Hard	Round of 16	Williams	3–6, 6–4, 7–5	2:12	3/3	3	1
5.	1998	(United States) Indian Wells Masters	Tier I	Hard	Semifinals	Hingis	6–0, 7–6^{(9–7)}	1:24	2/3	4	1
6.	1998	(United States) Miami Open	Tier I	Hard	Semifinals	Williams	6–2, 5–7, 6–2	1:59	3/3	4	2
7.	1998	(Italy) Italian Open	Tier I	Clay	Final	Hingis	6–3, 2–6, 6–3	1:46	3/3	5	2
8.	1998	(France) Roland Garros	Major	Clay	Quarterfinals	Hingis	6–3, 6–4	1:22	2/3	6	2
9.	1999	(Italy) Italian Open	Tier I	Clay	Semifinals	Williams	6–4, 1–6, 6–4	1:28	3/3	6	3
10.	1999	(United States) Southern California Open	Tier II	Hardx	Final	Hingis	6–4, 6–0	1:02	2/3	7	3
11.	1999	(United States) US Open	Major	Hard	Semifinals	Hingis	6–1, 4–6, 6–3	2:01	3/3	8	3
12.	1999	(Germany) Grand Slam Cup	GS Cup	Carpet	Semifinals	Williams	6–2, 6–7^{(6–8)}, 9–7	2:31	3/3	8	4
13.	1999	(Switzerland) Zurich Open	Tier I	Hard (i)	Final	Williams	6–3, 6–4	1:26	2/3	8	5
14.	1999	(United States) WTA Tour Championships	Tour Finals	Carpet	Semifinals	Hingis	6–4, 7–6^{(7–2)}	1:49	2/3	9	5
15.	2000	(United Kingdom) Wimbledon	Major	Grass	Quarterfinals	Williams	6–3, 4–6, 6–4	2:05	3/3	9	6
16.	2000	(United States) US Open	Major	Hard	Semifinals	Williams	4–6, 6–3, 7–5	1:53	3/3	9	7
17.	2001	(Australia) Australian Open	Major	Hard	Semifinals	Hingis	6–1, 6–1	0:53	2/3	10	7
18.	2001	(United States) Miami Open	Tier I	Hard	Semifinals	Williams	6–3, 7–6^{(8–6)}	1:40	2/3	10	8
19.	2002	(Germany) WTA Hamburg	Tier II	Clay	Semifinals	Williams	7–5, 6–3	1:12	2/3	10	9
20.	2006	(Poland) Warsaw Open	Tier II	Clay	Round of 16	Williams	4–6, 7–5, 6–4	2:34	3/3	10	10
21.	2006	(Italy) Italian Open	Tier I	Clay	Semifinals	Hingis	0–6, 6–3, 6–3	1:33	3/3	11	10

=== Doubles ===
Martina Hingis–Venus Williams (2–2)

No.	Year	Tournament	Tier	Surface	Round	Winners	Score	Opponents	Hingis	Williams
1.	1998	(United States) Indian Wells Masters	Tier I	Hard	Semifinals	Hingis/Lučić	7–5, 4–6, 6–1	S.Williams/V.Williams	1	0
2.	1999	(France) Roland Garros	Major	Clay	Final	S.Williams/V.Williams	6–3, 6–7^{(2–7)}, 8–6	Hingis/Kournikova	1	1
3.	2001	(Australia) Sydney International	Tier II	Hard	Round of 16	Hingis/Seles	6–4, 3–6, 7–6^{(7–2)}	S.Williams/V.Williams	2	1
4.	2001	(Australia) Australian Open	Major	Hard	Semifinals	S.Williams/V.Williams	7–5, 6–2	Hingis/Seles	2	2

== Exhibitions ==
=== Singles ===
Martina Hingis–Venus Williams (3–4)

No.	Year	Tournament Name	Tournament Location	Surface	Winner	Score
1.	2010	World TeamTennis	Washington, D.C., United States	Hard	Williams	5–4^{(5–2)}
2.	2012	World TeamTennis	New York City, U.S.	Hard (i)	Williams	5-1
3.	2012	World TeamTennis	New York City, U.S.	Hard (i)	Williams	2-0
4.	2012	World TeamTennis	New York City, U.S.	Hard (i)	Williams	1-0^{(7–0)}
5.	2014	Champions Tennis League	Chennai, India	Hard	Hingis	6–3
6.	2014	Champions Tennis League	Bangalore, India	Hard	Hingis	6–1
7.	2017	Greenbrier Champions Tennis Classic	White Sulphur Springs, WV, U.S.	Hard	Hingis	6–4, 2–6, 10–7

=== Doubles ===
Martina Hingis–Venus Williams (1–1)

No.	Year	Tournament Name	Tournament Location	Surface	Winners	Opponents	Score
1.	2010	World TeamTennis	Washington, D.C., United States	Hard	Williams/Stubbs	Hingis/Borwell	5–3
2.	2012	World TeamTennis	New York City, U.S.	Hard (i)	Hingis/Harkleroad	Williams/Rodionova	5–3

=== Mixed doubles ===
Martina Hingis–Venus Williams (2–3)

No.	Year	Tournament Name	Tournament Location	Surface	Winners	Opponents	Score
1.	2010	World TeamTennis	Washington, D.C., United States	Hard	Williams/Paes	Hingis/Jenkins	5–3
2.	2012	World TeamTennis	New York City, U.S.	Hard (i)	Hingis/Kendrick	Williams/Paes	5–3
3.	2014	Champions Tennis League	Chennai, India	Hard	Williams/López	Hingis/Youzhny	6–5^{(5–1)}
4.	2014	Champions Tennis League	Bangalore, India	Hard	Williams/Lopez	Hingis/Youzhny	6–3
5.	2017	Greenbrier Champions Tennis Classic	White Sulphur Springs, WV, U.S.	Hard	Hingis/Blake	Williams/Sampras	7-6^{(8–6)}, 4–6, 12–10

== Breakdown of the rivalry ==
- Hard courts: Hingis, 7–5
- Clay courts: Tied, 3–3
- Grass courts: Williams, 1–0
- Carpet: Tied, 1–1
- Grand Slam matches: Hingis, 4–2
- Grand Slam finals: Hingis, 1–0
- Year-End Championships matches: Hingis, 1–0
- Year-End Championships finals: None
- Fed Cup matches: None
- All finals: Hingis, 3–1

== See also ==
- List of tennis rivalries
