= Chuck Liddell vs. Tito Ortiz =

Mixed martial arts rivalry

Chuck "The Iceman" Liddell vs. "The Huntington Beach Bad Boy" Tito Ortiz is a trilogy of mixed martial arts fights between Chuck Liddell and Tito Ortiz; two that took place in the Ultimate Fighting Championship and one in the Golden Boy Promotions MMA promotion. All three fights have ended in a knockout in the Light Heavyweight Division.

At the first meeting at UFC 47, Liddell won by knockout at 0:38 seconds in the second round. By this victory he became the first person to knockout Ortiz. The second time, was a UFC Light Heavyweight Championship bout at UFC 66 in which Liddell won again by technical knockout at 3:59 in the third round. Liddell and Ortiz were scheduled to meet a third time at UFC 115 but Ortiz was forced out of the bout after an injury required him to receive neck fusion surgery. Liddell instead fought Rich Franklin.

== UFC 47: It's On ==
- Date: April 2, 2004
- Title(s) on the line: UFC Light Heavyweight Championship

Tale of the tape
Boxer	(United States) Chuck Liddell	(United States) Tito Ortiz
Nickname	The Iceman	The Huntington Beach Bad Boy
Hometown	Santa Barbara, California	Huntington Beach, California
Pre-fight record	14–3	10–4

Result
- Liddell wins by knockout at 0:38 of round 2

After Liddell and Ortiz had both lost to Randy Couture in their respective bouts at UFC 43 and UFC 44, they were set to face at UFC 47 on April 2, 2004, in Las Vegas. After most of the first round was spent feeling each other out, Liddell threw a few punches and a kick which was blocked by Ortiz, with Ortiz slapping himself on the head, taunting Liddell.

When the round ended Ortiz pushed referee John McCarthy out of his way, into Liddell, and the pair exchanged words. Shortly after the second round started, Liddell landed a flurry of punches that dropped Ortiz and led to a KO victory. Ortiz has since stated that Liddell's thumb made contact with his eye, causing him momentarily to see "nothing but black".

== Ortiz and Liddell win streaks ==
Following his win over Ortiz, Liddell once again established himself as the number one contender for the UFC Light Heavyweight Title. He, along with then champion Randy Couture, went on to become opposing coaches in the first season of the UFC's eventual hit reality series The Ultimate Fighter. After the season's conclusion, Liddell and Couture met for a second time on April 16, 2005 at UFC 52. Liddell was successful in the rematch by defeating Couture via knockout at 2:03 of the first round and thus becoming the new UFC Light Heavyweight Champion. The win, along with his exposure on the show and the UFC's growing popularity, garnered Liddell much media attention and fame. He would go on to become a household name throughout 2005 and 2006 with notable title defenses over Jeremy Horn, Randy Couture, and Renato Sobral. The rubber match with Couture is to date the UFC's largest grossing gate at $3.3 million and was widely marked as the UFC's first major trilogy.

Following the loss to Liddell, Ortiz then grabbed back-to-back decision wins over Patrick Cote at UFC 50 and Vitor Belfort at UFC 51 before temporarily leaving the UFC due to contract disputes. Eventually, Ortiz returned in 2006 and defeated The Ultimate Fighter 1 winner and rising star Forrest Griffin via split decision at UFC 59. Following the win, Ortiz resumed his long standing feud with Ken Shamrock. The two were opposing coaches on season three of The Ultimate Fighter and later fought in a highly anticipated rematch on July 8, 2006 at UFC 61, where Ortiz smothered Shamrock to a TKO victory at 1:18 of the first round. Due to the controversy surrounding the stoppage, Ortiz and Shamrock met a third time on October 10, 2006 at Ortiz vs. Shamrock 3: The Final Chapter where Ortiz again dominated Shamrock en route to a TKO victory at 2:22 of the first round. Much like Liddell, Ortiz's exposure on the show, along with his feud with Shamrock, gained him notable popularity and made him the highest grossing UFC fighter in 2006.

== UFC 66: Liddell vs. Ortiz II ==
- Date: December 30, 2006
- Title(s) on the line: UFC Light Heavyweight Championship

Tale of the tape
Boxer	(United States) Chuck Liddell	(United States) Tito Ortiz
Nickname	The Iceman	The Huntington Beach Bad Boy
Hometown	Santa Barbara, California	Huntington Beach, California
Pre-fight record	19–3	15–4
Recognition	UFC Light Heavyweight Champion	

Result
- Liddell wins by technical knockout at 3:59 of round 3

Headlining UFC 66 was a championship fight with two of the UFC's biggest light heavyweight stars, Light Heavyweight Champion Chuck Liddell defending his title against former champion Tito Ortiz. This fight was first announced by Ortiz at the UFC 63 weigh-ins on September 22, 2006.

In what would be one of the most financially successful UFC events to date, Liddell fought a rematch with Ortiz at UFC 66, which took place on December 30, 2006. Midway through the first round, Liddell caught Ortiz with a flurry of punches that dropped Ortiz to the canvas. After taking heavy shots from Liddell, Ortiz was able to scramble and survive the round. The second round appeared to be more even for both fighters, with Liddell neutralizing Ortiz's wrestling ability and Ortiz defending against Liddell's strikes. As the ending of the round neared, Ortiz successfully secured a takedown on Liddell and briefly pinned him against the cage as Liddell scrambled before the bell rang. The start of the third round was again even before Liddell pressured Ortiz with another flurry of punches. After an exchange of blows, Ortiz attempted a single leg takedown but ended up mounted by Liddell, who began raining down a series of strikes that Ortiz could not successfully defend. The referee then stopped the fight and Liddell was declared the winner via TKO to successfully defend his Light Heavyweight Championship for a fourth time.

During the post fight press conference, Dana White awarded both fighters "Fight of the Night" honors. A humble Ortiz congratulated Liddell and declared him the pound for pound best fighter at the time. It was later revealed that Liddell tore his MCL prior to the fight. In addition, during the fight he popped the tendon out on the middle finger on his left hand. Ortiz himself claimed he may have broken his foot during a kick to Liddell's knee. An MRI later showed that it did not break.

The Liddell/Ortiz rematch scored the UFC their first 1,100,000 buyrate, a total that would not be achieved again until UFC 91 in 2008.

== The decline of Liddell and Ortiz ==
Following his second win over Ortiz, Liddell was then set to defend his title against UFC newcomer Quinton Jackson at UFC 71. Despite losing to Jackson in 2003 in the Pride Fighting Championship organization in Japan, Liddell was favored to win the rematch. Liddell however was quickly disposed of by Jackson, losing the fight via KO at 1:54 seconds in the first round and thus losing his title. Liddell returned to the octagon at UFC 76 to face The Ultimate Fighter 2 alumni Keith Jardine where he was defeated via split decision in a closely contested contest. The loss made it the first time Liddell had suffered two consecutive losses. Liddell then met MMA Legend and dangerous slugger Wanderlei Silva at UFC 79, a bout that had been two years in the making. As predicted, the fight was a grueling, bloody slugfest that saw both men exchanging thunderous blows. After a three round war, Liddell was awarded a unanimous decision. The fight would go on to win "Fight of the Night" as well as "Fight of the Year" awards. After establishing himself as a top contender again, Liddell went on to face The Ultimate Fighter 2 winner Rashad Evans at UFC 88. Like his previous bouts, Liddell controlled the pace with his strikes and kicks that kept Evans at bay. However, early in the second round, Liddell threw a right uppercut just as Evans connected with an overhand right, causing Liddell to fall unconscious to the mat. The knockout was dubbed "Knockout of the Year" by MMA-website Sherdog and marking the first time Liddell had been knocked out cold. Following the loss, Liddell attempted to round out his skills with American Top Team in preparation for his next fight against Mauricio Rua. The fight took place at UFC 97 on April 18, 2009. After an exchange of shots from both fighters, Liddell was floored by a punch from Rua in the first round and was defeated via TKO after Rua landed several unanswered punches. After the fight, White declared that Liddell is retired from fighting. White said, "I care about him. I care about his health, and it's over, man. It's over". White went further, saying, "At the end of the day, I care about these guys. I don't want to see anybody stick around too long. You're never going to see Chuck Liddell on the canvas again".

Ortiz meanwhile attempted to rebound from his loss to Liddell and faced off against Rashad Evans at UFC 73. In a bout that was going his way, Ortiz was docked a point in the second round for repeatedly grabbing the fence. As a result, the fight was declared a draw. Over the next year, Ortiz exchanged in a heated verbal warfare with Dana White. Ortiz claimed that UFC fighters were underpaid and criticized White for trying to use the UFC to promote himself. White himself went on to publicly attack Ortiz by calling Ortiz "jackass" and claiming him to be "not a real fighter" in several media outlets. Ortiz then fought the undefeated Lyoto Machida at UFC 84. Despite locking in a near fight-ending triangle choke, Ortiz was unable to keep up with Machida's pace and was picked apart by his punches, kicks, and takedowns en route to a lopsided unanimous decision. The fight concluded Ortiz's stay with the promotion as he chose not to re-sign, citing his frustration with UFC president Dana White as a major factor in the decision. After leaving the UFC, Ortiz was approached by multiple promotions, including the now defunct EliteXC, Affliction and the American Fight League. However, a clause in his old UFC contract forbade him from signing with or fighting for any other organization until approximately April–June 2009. Until his return to the UFC, Ortiz was considered the biggest free agent on the market. On July 17, 2009, both Ortiz and Dana White stated that the pair had made amends and Ortiz re-signed with the UFC a week later. Originally scheduled to face UFC Hall of Famer Mark Coleman, Ortiz instead took on Forrest Griffin in the main event at UFC 106. Whilst Ortiz was able to secure takedowns in the first and second rounds, Griffin showed considerable improvement in his striking and kept the fight standing throughout the third, leading to the split decision victory.

== The Ultimate Fighter and cancelled third fight ==
During The Ultimate Fighter: Heavyweights Finale, Dana White announced that Chuck Liddell would be coaching against fierce rival Tito Ortiz on the 11th season of The Ultimate Fighter, with the two of them fighting each other on June 12, 2010, at UFC 115. White claimed that the two still hated each other and figured fans would want to see third bout anyway. In the time leading up to the show, Ortiz was criticized for disclosing information in regards to Liddell's alcohol problems. This upset Liddell, who stated he considered the third fight with Ortiz a tuneup fight but now claimed he was training hard to kill him.

However, in March, it was rumored that Ortiz was pulling out for as yet unknown reasons and Ortiz would be replaced by former UFC middleweight champion Rich Franklin. This was then denied by UFC president Dana White. On April 7, 2010, White confirmed that Liddell vs. Ortiz 3 would be the main event for the card; however, on April 12, 2010, the main event was changed to Liddell vs. Rich Franklin.

== Aftermath ==
At UFC 115, Liddell suffered his third consecutive knockout loss when he was defeated by Franklin in the first round by knockout. Following the bout, Dana White declared that Liddell would never fight in the UFC again. Despite his desire to continue fighting, Liddell decided to end his fighting career and announced his retirement on December 29, 2010 at the UFC 125 press conference and stated he would be taking the position of the UFC Vice President of Business Development. Liddell was visibly emotional at the announcement, acknowledging his retirement and an end to his fighting with words of farewell: "Most of all I want to thank my fans and my family. I love this sport and I'm excited to go to this new stage in my life and keep promoting the best sport in the world, the sport I love... now that I'm retired".

Ortiz meanwhile returned to the octagon for the first time since his neck surgery on October 23, 2011 at UFC 121 against his Ultimate Fighter Season 3 pupil Matt Hamill. Ortiz lost the bout by unanimous decision in a lopsided fight, making it his fourth loss in five fights and third consecutive. Dana White hinted after the event at Ortiz's possible release by stating: "We all know what happens to guys when they lose four fights in the UFC". Despite this, White granted Ortiz one last chance to compete in the 205 pound division. He was scheduled to face Antônio Rogério Nogueira in the main event at UFC Fight Night 24 but was forced out of the bout after receiving a cut above his eye during training that required stitches. Ortiz made his return at UFC 132 where he faced The Ultimate Fighter Season 8 winner Ryan Bader. Coming in as heavy underdog with his UFC career on the line, Ortiz secured his first victory since 2006 by submitting Bader at 1:56 of the first round and saved his UFC career. Ortiz then attempted to reenter the top 10 of the UFC Light Heavyweight Division by stepping in for an injured Phil Davis to face number one contender Rashad Evans in the main event at UFC 133. Despite securing what might have been a fight-ending guillotine choke, Ortiz was heavily dominated by Evans and was defeated by technical knockout in the second round. According to Dana White, the loss however would not affect Ortiz's career in the UFC. After dropping back-to-back losses to Antônio Rogério Nogueira at UFC 140 and Forrest Griffin at UFC 148, Ortiz retired from fighting after 15 years competing for the UFC. Prior to his bout at UFC 148, Ortiz became the ninth inductee into the UFC Hall of Fame.

Today, many sports and media analysts credit the Liddell and Ortiz rivalry with bringing the sport of mixed martial arts into the mainstream of American sports and entertainment.

On September 26, 2019, ESPN announced that as the inaugural special about mixed martial arts on 30 for 30 will be covering the trilogy and feud. The episode will air on October 15, 2019.

== Third bout ==
- Date: November 24, 2018

Tale of the tape
Boxer	(United States) Chuck Liddell	(United States) Tito Ortiz
Nickname	The Iceman	The Huntington Beach Bad Boy
Hometown	Santa Barbara, California	Huntington Beach, California
Pre-fight record	21–8	20–12

Result
- Ortiz wins by knockout at 4:24 of round 1

Oscar De La Hoya's Golden Boy Promotions made a one-off into the mixed martial arts market during 2018, with a November 24, 2018 at The Forum presented by Chase in Inglewood, California. The event was headlined by the third fight between Chuck Liddell and Tito Ortiz in a hexagonal cage. Ortiz earned his first win in the trilogy, winning by knockout in the first round.
