= El Clásico del Clasico =

International baseball rivalry

- Teams: Dominican Republic; Puerto Rico
- First meeting: March 7, 2006; Dominican Republic 11–5 Puerto Rico (World Baseball Classic, Orlando)
- Latest meeting: March 11, 2026; Dominican Republic 7–5 Puerto Rico (World Baseball Classic, in Miami)

Statistics
- Total meetings: 6
- Most player appearances: Yadier Molina (PUR) / Robinson Canó (DOM) (5 World Baseball Classic tournaments)
- Top scorer: Most home runs Yadier Molina (PUR) (Career WBC home runs)
- All-time series: World Baseball Classic; 5–1, Dominican Republic

El Clásico del Clásico (English: The Classic of the Classic) or the Dominican Republic–Puerto Rico baseball rivalry is a major international sports rivalry between the Dominican Republic and Puerto Rico. Widely referred to in Spanish-language media by this title, the matchup is also known as the Clásico del Caribe (English: Caribbean Classic).

== Background ==
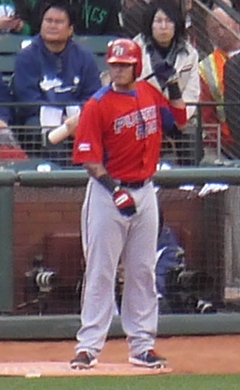
Molina batting for the Puerto Rico national team in the 2013 World Baseball Classic.

The international baseball rivalry between the Dominican Republic and the Puerto Rico in the World Baseball Classic is one of the most prominent matchups in international baseball.

The rivalry intensified during the 2013 World Baseball Classic, where the two teams met twice, including the championship game. The Dominican Republic won the final 3-0 to finish the tournament undefeated. They met again in the group stage of the 2023 World Baseball Classic, where Puerto Rico defeated the Dominican Republic 5-2 to advance to the quarterfinals and eliminate the Dominican team.

== World Baseball Classic head-to-head results ==
Both nations have met 8 times in the World Baseball Classic, with Puerto Rico leading the head-to-head series at 5–3.

Edition	Date	Round	Venue	Winner	Score	Loser
2006	March 12, 2006	Second round	Hiram Bithorn Stadium (San Juan)	Puerto Rico	7–1	Dominican Republic
2009	March 10, 2009	First round	Hiram Bithorn Stadium (San Juan)	Puerto Rico	3–2	Dominican Republic
2009	March 13, 2009	First round	Hiram Bithorn Stadium (San Juan)	Puerto Rico	2–1	Dominican Republic
2013	March 10, 2013	First round	Hiram Bithorn Stadium (San Juan)	Dominican Republic	4–2	Puerto Rico
2013	March 16, 2013	Second round	Marlins Park (Miami)	Dominican Republic	2–0	Puerto Rico
2013	March 19, 2013	Championship	AT&T Park (San Francisco)	Dominican Republic	3–0	Puerto Rico
2017	March 14, 2017	Second round	Petco Park (San Diego)	Puerto Rico	3–1	Dominican Republic
2023	March 15, 2023	First round	LoanDepot Park (Miami)	Puerto Rico	5–2	Dominican Republic

== See also ==
- Dominican Republic immigration to Puerto Rico
- Japan–South Korea baseball rivalry
