= Japan–South Korea sports rivalries =

International sports rivalries

Because of their proximity, contentious history and similar sporting cultures, South Korea and Japan are frequent rivals in a wide variety of international sports, mainly in various Asian competitions.

== Football ==
=== National teams ===
- FIFA World Cup
- AFC Asian Cup
- EAFF E-1 Football Championship

=== Club ===
- AFC Champions League
- Lunar New Year Cup
- A3 Champions Cup
- Pan-Pacific Championship
- JOMO Cup
- Japan and South Korea Women's League Championship

== Volleyball ==
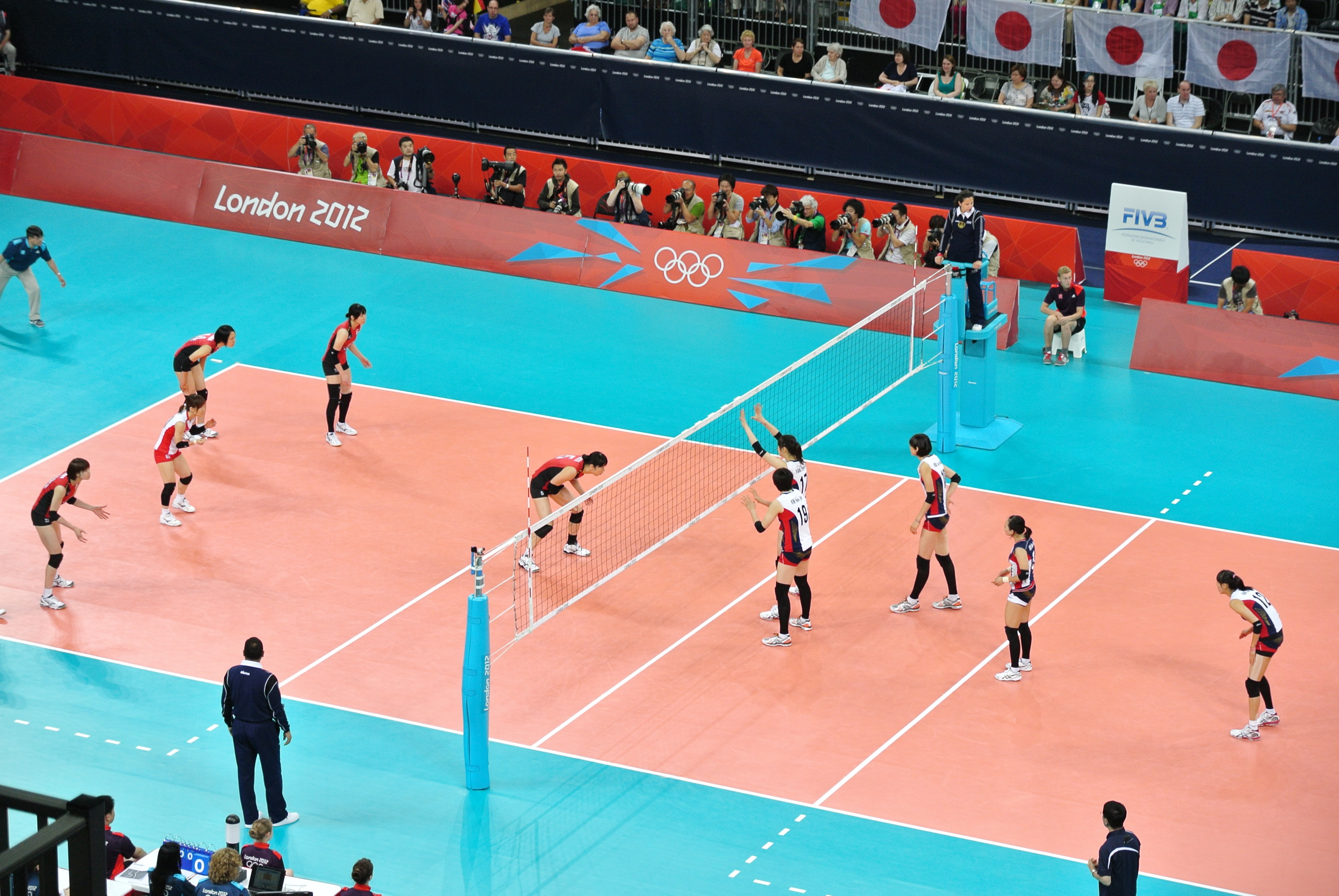
2012 Summer Olympics Korea vs Japan women's match

== Judo ==
South Korea and Japan has had a long history in judo, especially with the two nations' dominance in Asia.

In recent times, the rivalries have been greatest in the men's half-lightweight, lightweight and middleweight categories.

In the men's half-lightweight, rivalries stemmed to the quarter-final at the 2012 Olympic Games, that featured Japan's Masashi Ebinuma and South Korea's Cho Jun-ho. The decision was first called in Cho's favor, and then recalled to hand the win to Ebinuma. It is one of the most controversial fights in Olympic judo.

Ebinuma had dominated the weight division from 2011–2014, winning three world championships, before South Korean An Baul broke his streak by winning the 2015 World Championships.

In the men's lightweight, Korea had a surge of dominance in the division with Wang Ki-chun, who won the world championships in 2007 and 2009. In 2010, Japan's Hiroyuki Akimoto took over Wang as the world champion, marking a new era of Japanese dominance in the men's lightweight. Fellow countrymen Riki Nakaya and Shohei Ono then shared domination, with Nakaya winning in 2011 and 2014, and Ono in 2013 and 2015. In the upcoming 2016 Olympics, it is widely thought that newly formed rivals Ono and Japanese-born Korean An Chang-rim will be favorites for gold.

In the men's middleweight, one of Japan's weaker divisions alongside the half-middleweight, South Korea had the upper hand in the past decade, producing two world champions in the form of Lee Kyu-won (2009) and Gwak Dong-han (2015), and an Olympic champion in Song Dae-nam. Japan's closest finish in recent times was in 2010 and 2011 with Daiki Nishiyama's silver medals. Today, Gwak has formed a rivalry with several Japanese middleweights, most notably Nishiyama (3–3), Mashu Baker (2–1 in favor of Baker) and Yuya Yoshida (1–1), and will most likely compete against them at the 2016 Olympics.

In the team's competition, Japan and South Korea rekindled their vie for the number one country in judo at the 2015 World Championships, meeting in the final. With wins from Ebinuma, reigning world champion Takanori Nagase and Takeshi Ojitani, Japan claimed their second consecutive team gold while Korea settled for silver in their first team fight in five years.
