= Top ten ranked male tennis players =

This article presents top ten lists of male singles tennis players, as ranked by various official and non-official ranking authorities throughout the history of the sport.

The article is split into two sections: 1912–1972, and since 1973 when the first official ATP rankings were published, for ease of navigation.

== Top ten rankings by year ==
=== 1973 ===
| ATP | Lance Tingay (The Daily Telegraph) | Bud Collins (The Boston Globe) | Rino Tommasi (La Gazzetta dello Sport) | Rex Bellamy (Note: He gave a differen ranking in World Tennis in December 1973.) (The Times) | Martini and Rossi | Poll of 17 international sportswriters |
|---|---|---|---|---|---|---|
| 1. I. Năstase; 2. J. Newcombe; 3. J. Connors; 4. T. Okker; 5. S. Smith; 6. K. Rosewall; 7. M. Orantes; 8. R. Laver; 9. J. Kodeš; 10. A. Ashe | 1. J. Newcombe; 2. S. Smith; 3. I. Năstase; 4. J. Kodeš; 5. A. Ashe; 6. K. Rosewall; 7. R. Laver; 8. T. Gorman; 9. J. Connors; 10. T. Okker | 1. I. Năstase; 2. J. Newcombe; 3. S. Smith; 4. R. Laver; 5. K. Rosewall; 6. J. Connors; 7. T. Okker; 8. J. Kodeš; 9. A. Ashe; 10. M. Orantes | 1. I. Năstase; 2. J. Connors; 3. R. Laver; 4. K. Rosewall; 5. S. Smith; 6. T. Okker; 7. J. Newcombe; 8. M. Orantes; 9. A. Ashe; 10. J. Kodeš | 1. I. Năstase; 2. T. Okker; 3. S. Smith; 4. J. Newcombe; 5. R. Laver; 6. J. Connors; 7. K. Rosewall; 8. T. Gorman; 9. A. Ashe; 10. J. Kodeš | 1. I. Năstase; 2. J. Newcombe; 3. S. Smith; 4. T. Okker; 5. J. Connors; 6. R. Laver; 7. A. Ashe; 8. K. Rosewall; 9. J. Kodeš; 10. M. Orantes | 1. I. Năstase; 2. J. Newcombe; 3. S. Smith; 4. J. Connors; 5. T. Okker; 6. R. Laver; 7. K. Rosewall; 8. J. Kodeš; 9. A. Ashe; 10. M. Orantes |

=== 1974 ===
| ATP | Lance Tingay | Bud Collins | Rino Tommasi | Rex Bellamy | Martini and Rossi | World Tennis | Tennis magazine (U.S.) | Judith Elian (L'Équipe) |
|---|---|---|---|---|---|---|---|---|
| 1. J. Connors; 2. J. Newcombe; 3. B. Borg; 4. R. Laver; 5. G. Vilas; 6. T. Okker; 7. A. Ashe; 8. K. Rosewall; 9. S. Smith; 10. I. Năstase | 1. J. Connors; 2. K. Rosewall; 3. J. Newcombe; 4. B. Borg; 5. I. Năstase; 6. S. Smith; 7. R. Laver; 8. M. Orantes; 9. A. Metreveli; 10. G. Vilas | 1. J. Connors; 2. G. Vilas; 3. J. Newcombe; 4. B. Borg; 5. R. Laver; 6. I. Năstase; 7. K. Rosewall; 8. S. Smith; 9. M. Orantes; 10. A. Ashe | 1. J. Connors; 2. J. Newcombe; 3. R. Laver; 4. I. Năstase; 5. G. Vilas; 6. K. Rosewall; 7. B. Borg; 8. T. Okker; 9. A. Ashe; 10. S. Smith | 1. J. Connors; 2. J. Newcombe; 3. B. Borg; 4. G. Vilas; 5. A. Ashe; 6. I. Năstase; 7. R. Laver; 8. R. Tanner; 9. S. Smith; 10. A. Metreveli | 1. J. Connors; 2. J. Newcombe; 3. G. Vilas; 4. B. Borg; 5. K. Rosewall; 6. I. Năstase; 7. R. Laver; 8. S. Smith; 9. A. Ashe; 10. M. Orantes | 1. J. Connors; 2. G. Vilas; 3. J. Newcombe; 4. B. Borg; 5. K. Rosewall; 6. I. Năstase; 7. R. Laver; 8. S. Smith; 9. A. Ashe; 10. T. Okker | 1. J. Connors; 2. J. Newcombe; 3. K. Rosewall; 4. B. Borg; 5. G. Vilas; 6. R. Laver; 7. S. Smith; 8. I. Năstase; 9. A. Ashe; 10. M. Orantes | 1. J. Connors; 2. B. Borg; 3. K. Rosewall; 4. J. Newcombe; 5. G. Vilas; 6. S. Smith; 7. I. Năstase; 8. A. Ashe; 9. R. Laver; 10. T. Okker |

=== 1975 ===
| ATP | Lance Tingay | Bud Collins | Rino Tommasi | Rex Bellamy | World Tennis | Tennis magazine (U.S.) | Judith Elian |
|---|---|---|---|---|---|---|---|
| 1. J. Connors; 2. G. Vilas; 3. B. Borg; 4. A. Ashe; 5. M. Orantes; 6. K. Rosewall; 7. I. Năstase; 8. J. Alexander; 9. R. Tanner; 10. R. Laver | 1. A. Ashe; 2. M. Orantes; 3. J. Connors; 4. B. Borg; 5. G. Vilas; 6. I. Năstase; 7. R. Ramírez; 8. J. Newcombe; 9. R. Laver; 10. R. Tanner | 1. A. Ashe; 2. B. Borg; 3. M. Orantes; 4. J. Connors; 5. I. Năstase; 6. G. Vilas; 7. R. Laver; 8. R. Ramírez; 9. J. Alexander; 10. K. Rosewall | 1. J. Connors; 2. G. Vilas; 3. B. Borg; 4. A. Ashe; 5. R. Laver; 6. M. Orantes; 7. I. Năstase; 8. K. Rosewall; 9. T. Okker; 10. R. Ramírez | 1. A. Ashe; 2. B. Borg; 3. M. Orantes; 4. G. Vilas; 5. J. Connors; 6. I. Năstase; 7. R. Ramírez; 8. H. Solomon; 9. R. Tanner; 10. J. Newcombe | 1. A. Ashe; 2. J. Connors; 3. B. Borg; 4. M. Orantes; 5. I. Năstase; 6. G. Vilas; 7. R. Ramírez; 8. R. Laver; 9. R. Tanner; 10. = H. Solomon = E. Dibbs | 1. A. Ashe; 2. J. Connors; 3. B. Borg; 4. M. Orantes; 5. G. Vilas; 6. I. Năstase; 7. R. Ramírez; 8. R. Laver; 9. K. Rosewall; 10. R. Tanner | 1. A. Ashe; 2. B. Borg; 3. J. Connors; 4. M. Orantes; 5. G. Vilas; 6. I. Năstase; 7. R. Ramírez; 8. R. Laver; 9. R. Tanner; 10. H. Solomon |

=== 1976 ===
| ATP | Lance Tingay | Bud Collins | Rino Tommasi | World Tennis | Tennis magazine (U.S.) |
|---|---|---|---|---|---|
| 1. J. Connors; 2. B. Borg; 3. I. Năstase; 4. M. Orantes; 5. R. Ramírez; 6. G. Vilas; 7. A. Panatta; 8. H. Solomon; 9. E. Dibbs; 10. B. Gottfried | 1. J. Connors; 2. B. Borg; 3. A. Panatta; 4. I. Năstase; 5. G. Vilas; 6. E. Dibbs; 7. H. Solomon; 8. M. Orantes; 9. R. Ramírez; 10. R. Tanner | 1. J. Connors; 2. B. Borg; 3. I. Năstase; 4. M. Orantes; 5. A. Panatta; 6. H. Solomon; 7. R. Ramírez; 8. R. Tanner; 9. E. Dibbs; 10. W. Fibak | 1. J. Connors; 2. I. Năstase; 3. B. Borg; 4. M. Orantes; 5. G. Vilas; 6. A. Ashe; 7. E. Dibbs; 8. A. Panatta; 9. R. Ramírez; 10. H. Solomon | 1. J. Connors; 2. B. Borg; 3. I. Năstase; 4. G. Vilas; 5. R. Ramírez; 6. M. Orantes; 7. E. Dibbs; 8. H. Solomon; 9. A. Panatta; 10. R. Tanner | 1. J. Connors; 2. B. Borg; 3. I. Năstase; 4. G. Vilas; 5. M. Orantes; 6. R. Ramírez; 7. A. Panatta; 8. E. Dibbs; 9. H. Solomon |

=== 1977 ===
| ATP | Lance Tingay | Bud Collins | Rino Tommasi | World Tennis | Tennis magazine (U.S.) | France Press | Barry Lorge (The Washington Post) |
|---|---|---|---|---|---|---|---|
| 1. J. Connors; 2. G. Vilas; 3. B. Borg; 4. V. Gerulaitis; 5. B. Gottfried; 6. E. Dibbs; 7. M. Orantes; 8. R. Ramírez; 9. I. Năstase; 10. D. Stockton | 1. B. Borg; 2. G. Vilas; 3. J. Connors; 4. V. Gerulaitis; 5. B. Gottfried; 6. D. Stockton; 7. E. Dibbs; 8. R. Ramírez; 9. H. Solomon; 10. R. Tanner | 1. B. Borg; 2. G. Vilas; 3. J. Connors; 4. V. Gerulaitis; 5. B. Gottfried; 6. M. Orantes; 7. D. Stockton; 8. E. Dibbs; 9. I. Năstase; 10. R. Ramírez | 1. B. Borg; 2. J. Connors; 3. G. Vilas; 4. B. Gottfried; 5. V. Gerulaitis; 6. E. Dibbs; 7. D. Stockton; 8. I. Năstase; 9. M. Orantes; 10. R. Ramírez | 1. G. Vilas; 2. B. Borg; 3. J. Connors; 4. B. Gottfried; 5. V. Gerulaitis; 6. M. Orantes; 7. E. Dibbs; 8. D. Stockton; 9. R. Ramírez; 10. R. Tanner | 1. B. Borg; 2. G. Vilas; 3. J. Connors; 4. B. Gottfried; 5. V. Gerulaitis; 6. M. Orantes; 7. R. Ramírez; 8. D. Stockton; 9. E. Dibbs; 10. I. Năstase | 1. G. Vilas; 2. B. Borg; 3. J. Connors; 4. V. Gerulaitis; 5. B. Gottfried; 6. M. Orantes; 7. E. Dibbs; 8. D. Stockton; 9. P. Dent; 10. R. Ramírez | 1. B. Borg; 2. G. Vilas; 3. J. Connors; 4. V. Gerulaitis; 5. B. Gottfried; 6. M. Orantes; 7. E. Dibbs; 8. D. Stockton; 9. R. Tanner; 10. R. Ramírez |

=== 1978 ===
| ATP | Lance Tingay | Bud Collins | Rino Tommasi | World Tennis | Tennis magazine (U.S.) |
|---|---|---|---|---|---|
| 1. J. Connors; 2. B. Borg; 3. G. Vilas; 4. J. McEnroe; 5. V. Gerulaitis; 6. E. Dibbs; 7. B. Gottfried; 8. R. Ramírez; 9. H. Solomon; 10. C. Barazzutti | 1. B. Borg; 2. J. Connors; 3. V. Gerulaitis; 4. G. Vilas; 5. E. Dibbs; 6. R. Ramírez; 7. B. Gottfried; 8. C. Barazzutti; 9. S. Mayer; 10. J. McEnroe | 1. B. Borg; 2. J. Connors; 3. J. McEnroe; 4. V. Gerulaitis; 5. E. Dibbs; 6. G. Vilas; 7. B. Gottfried; 8. R. Ramírez; 9. H. Solomon; 10. A. Ashe | 1. J. Connors; 2. B. Borg; 3. G. Vilas; 4. V. Gerulaitis; 5. J. McEnroe; 6. E. Dibbs; 7. B. Gottfried; 8. S. Mayer; 9. J. Higueras; 10. M. Orantes | 1. B. Borg; 2. J. Connors; 3. J. McEnroe; 4. V. Gerulaitis; 5. E. Dibbs; 6. G. Vilas; 7. R. Ramírez; 8. B. Gottfried; 9. H. Solomon; 10. C. Barazzutti | 1. J. Connors; 2. B. Borg; 3. V. Gerulaitis; 4. G. Vilas; 5. E. Dibbs; 6. J. McEnroe; 7. B. Gottfried; 8. R. Ramírez; 9. H. Solomon; 10. C. Barazzutti |

=== 1979 ===
| ATP | Lance Tingay | Bud Collins | Rino Tommasi | World Tennis | Tennis magazine (U.S.) |
|---|---|---|---|---|---|
| 1. B. Borg; 2. J. Connors; 3. J. McEnroe; 4. V. Gerulaitis; 5. R. Tanner; 6. G. Vilas; 7. A. Ashe; 8. H. Solomon; 9. J. Higueras; 10. E. Dibbs | 1. B. Borg; 2. J. McEnroe; 3. J. Connors; 4. V. Gerulaitis; 5. R. Tanner; 6. G. Vilas; 7. V. Pecci; 8. J. Higueras; 9. E. Dibbs; 10. H. Solomon | 1. B. Borg; 2. J. McEnroe; 3. J. Connors; 4. V. Gerulaitis; 5. R. Tanner; 6. G. Vilas; 7. H. Solomon; 8. J. Higueras; 9. V. Pecci; 10. W. Fibak | 1. B. Borg; 2. J. McEnroe; 3. J. Connors; 4. V. Gerulaitis; 5. R. Tanner; 6. V. Pecci; 7. A. Ashe; 8. E. Dibbs; 9. B. Gottfried; 10. H. Solomon | 1. B. Borg; 2. J. McEnroe; 3. J. Connors; 4. V. Gerulaitis; 5. R. Tanner; 6. G. Vilas; 7. J. Higueras; 8. H. Solomon; 9. P. Fleming; 10. V. Pecci | 1. B. Borg; 2. J. McEnroe; 3. J. Connors; 4. V. Gerulaitis; 5. R. Tanner; 6. G. Vilas; 7. H. Solomon; 8. J. Higueras; 9. E. Dibbs; 10. V. Pecci |

=== 1980 ===
| ATP | Lance Tingay | Bud Collins | Rino Tommasi | World Tennis | Tennis magazine (U.S.) |
|---|---|---|---|---|---|
| 1. B. Borg; 2. J. McEnroe; 3. J. Connors; 4. G. Mayer; 5. G. Vilas; 6. I. Lendl; 7. H. Solomon; 8. J. L. Clerc; 9. V. Gerulaitis; 10. E. Teltscher | 1. B. Borg; 2. J. McEnroe; 3. J. Connors; 4. G. Vilas; 5. V. Gerulaitis; 6. I. Lendl; 7. H. Solomon; 8. G. Mayer; 9. E. Teltscher; 10. B. Gottfried | 1. B. Borg; 2. J. McEnroe; 3. J. Connors; 4. I. Lendl; 5. G. Mayer; 6. G. Vilas; 7. J. L. Clerc; 8. V. Gerulaitis; 9. H. Solomon; 10. B. Gottfried | 1. B. Borg; 2. J. McEnroe; 3. J. Connors; 4. G. Mayer; 5. G. Vilas; 6. I. Lendl; 7. H. Solomon; 8. V. Gerulaitis; 9. J. L. Clerc; 10. V. Amritraj | 1. B. Borg; 2. J. McEnroe; 3. J. Connors; 4. I. Lendl; 5. G. Mayer; 6. G. Vilas; 7. H. Solomon; 8. V. Gerulaitis; 9. J. L. Clerc; 10. W. Fibak | 1. B. Borg; 2. J. McEnroe; 3. J. Connors; 4. I. Lendl; 5. = G. Vilas = G. Mayer; 7. V. Gerulaitis; 8. H. Solomon; 9. J. L. Clerc; 10. B. Gottfried |

=== 1981 ===
| ATP | Lance Tingay | Bud Collins | Rino Tommasi | World Tennis | Tennis magazine (U.S.) |
|---|---|---|---|---|---|
| 1. J. McEnroe; 2. I. Lendl; 3. J. Connors; 4. B. Borg; 5. J. L. Clerc; 6. G. Vilas; 7. G. Mayer; 8. E. Teltscher; 9. V. Gerulaitis; 10. P. McNamara | 1. J. McEnroe; 2. B. Borg; 3. J. Connors; 4. I. Lendl; 5. J. L. Clerc; 6. V. Pecci; 7. G. Mayer; 8. G. Vilas; 9. V. Gerulaitis; 10. B. Teacher | 1. J. McEnroe; 2. B. Borg; 3. J. Connors; 4. I. Lendl; 5. J. L. Clerc; 6. G. Vilas; 7. G. Mayer; 8. E. Teltscher; 9. P. McNamara; 10. R. Tanner | 1. J. McEnroe; 2. B. Borg; 3. J. Connors; 4. I. Lendl; 5. J. L. Clerc; 6. G. Mayer; 7. G. Vilas; 8. E. Teltscher; 9. P. McNamara; 10. R. Tanner | 1. J. McEnroe; 2. B. Borg; 3. I. Lendl; 4. J. L. Clerc; 5. J. Connors; 6. G. Vilas; 7. G. Mayer; 8. E. Teltscher; 9. P. McNamara; 10. V. Gerulaitis | 1. J. McEnroe; 2. B. Borg; 3. = J. Connors = I. Lendl; 5. J. L. Clerc; 6. G. Vilas; 7. G. Mayer; 8. = R. Tanner = E. Teltscher; 10. P. McNamara |

=== 1982 ===
| ATP | Lance Tingay | Bud Collins | Rino Tommasi | World Tennis | Tennis magazine (U.S.) | John Barrett | Nixdorf |
|---|---|---|---|---|---|---|---|
| 1. J. McEnroe; 2. J. Connors; 3. I. Lendl; 4. G. Vilas; 5. V. Gerulaitis; 6. J. L. Clerc; 7. M. Wilander; 8. G. Mayer; 9. Y. Noah; 10. P. McNamara | 1. J. Connors; 2. I. Lendl; 3. J. McEnroe; 4. M. Wilander; 5. G. Vilas; 6. V. Gerulaitis; 7. J. Higueras; 8. A. Gómez; 9. Y. Noah; 10. E. Teltscher | 1. J. Connors; 2. I. Lendl; 3. J. McEnroe; 4. M. Wilander; 5. G. Vilas; 6. V. Gerulaitis; 7. J. L. Clerc; 8. Y. Noah; 9. J. Kriek; 10. J. Higueras | 1. I. Lendl; 2. J. McEnroe; 3. J. Connors; 4. G. Vilas; 5. V. Gerulaitis; 6. Y. Noah; 7. M. Wilander; 8. G. Mayer; 9. K. Curren; 10. J. Higueras | 1. J. Connors; 2. I. Lendl; 3. J. McEnroe; 4. M. Wilander; 5. G. Vilas; 6. V. Gerulaitis; 7. J. Higueras; 8. J. L. Clerc; 9. Y. Noah; 10. G. Mayer | 1. J. Connors; 2. I. Lendl; 3. J. McEnroe; 4. G. Vilas; 5. M. Wilander; 6. V. Gerulaitis; 7. G. Mayer; 8. J. L. Clerc; 9. Y. Noah; 10. J. Higueras | 1. J. Connors; 2. I. Lendl; 3. J. McEnroe; 4. G. Vilas; 5. M. Wilander; 6. V. Gerulaitis; 7. G. Mayer; 8. Y. Noah; 9. J. L. Clerc; 10. J. Higueras | 1. J. McEnroe; 2. I. Lendl; 3. J. Connors; 4. G. Vilas; 5. V. Gerulaitis; 6. J. L. Clerc; 7. W. Fibak; 8. M. Wilander; 9. K. Curren; 10. G. Mayer |

=== 1983 ===
| ATP | Lance Tingay | Bud Collins | Rino Tommasi | World Tennis | Tennis magazine (U.S.) | Nixdorf |
|---|---|---|---|---|---|---|
| 1. J. McEnroe; 2. I. Lendl; 3. J. Connors; 4. M. Wilander; 5. Y. Noah; 6. J. Arias; 7. J. Higueras; 8. J. L. Clerc; 9. K. Curren; 10. G. Mayer | 1. J. McEnroe; 2. J. Connors; 3. I. Lendl; 4. M. Wilander; 5. Y. Noah; 6. J. Arias; 7. J. Higueras; 8. G. Vilas; 9. J. L. Clerc; 10. V. Gerulaitis | 1. J. McEnroe; 2. M. Wilander; 3. J. Connors; 4. Y. Noah; 5. I. Lendl; 6. J. Arias; 7. J. Higueras; 8. J. L. Clerc; 9. B. Scanlon; 10. G. Vilas | 1. M. Wilander; 2. I. Lendl; 3. J. McEnroe; 4. J. Connors; 5. Y. Noah; 6. J. Higueras; 7. G. Vilas; 8. J. Arias; 9. G. Mayer; 10. J. L. Clerc | 1. J. McEnroe; 2. M. Wilander; 3. J. Connors; 4. I. Lendl; 5. Y. Noah; 6. J. Arias; 7. J. Higueras; 8. B. Scanlon; 9. J. L. Clerc; 10. K. Curren | 1. J. McEnroe; 2. J. Connors; 3. I. Lendl; 4. M. Wilander; 5. Y. Noah; 6. J. Arias; 7. J. Higueras; 8. G. Vilas; 9. B. Scanlon; 10. J. L. Clerc | 1. J. McEnroe; 2. J. Connors; 3. I. Lendl; 4. M. Wilander; 5. Y. Noah; 6. J. Arias; 7. A. Gómez; 8. G. Vilas; 9. J. Higueras; 10. E. Teltscher |

=== 1984 ===
| ATP | Lance Tingay | Bud Collins | Rino Tommasi | World Tennis (panel ranking) | Tennis magazine (U.S.) | John Barrett |
|---|---|---|---|---|---|---|
| 1. J. McEnroe; 2. J. Connors; 3. I. Lendl; 4. M. Wilander; 5. A. Gómez; 6. A. Järryd; 7. H. Sundström; 8. P. Cash; 9. E. Teltscher; 10. Y. Noah | 1. J. McEnroe; 2. I. Lendl; 3. M. Wilander; 4. J. Connors; 5. A. Gómez; 6. P. Cash; 7. H. Sundström; 8. K. Curren; 9. J. Aguilera; 10. A. Krickstein | 1. J. McEnroe; 2. I. Lendl; 3. J. Connors; 4. M. Wilander; 5. A. Gómez; 6. H. Sundström; 7. A. Krickstein; 8. A. Järryd; 9. J. Nyström; 10. P. Cash | 1. J. McEnroe; 2. J. Connors; 3. I. Lendl; 4. M. Wilander; 5. A. Gómez; 6. H. Sundström; 7. Y. Noah; 8. A. Järryd; 9. J. Nyström; 10. E. Teltscher | 1. J. McEnroe; 2. J. Connors; 3. I. Lendl; 4. A. Gómez; 5. M. Wilander; 6. P. Cash; 7. A. Krickstein; 8. H. Sundström; 9. A. Järryd; 10. T. Šmíd | 1. J. McEnroe; 2. I. Lendl; 3. J. Connors; 4. M. Wilander; 5. A. Gómez; 6. H. Sundström; 7. A. Järryd; 8. P. Cash; 9. J. Nyström; 10. A. Krickstein | 1. J. McEnroe; 2. I. Lendl; 3. J. Connors; 4. M. Wilander; 5. A. Gómez; 6. P. Cash; 7. H. Sundström; 8. A. Järryd; 9. J. Nyström; 10. J. Arias |

=== 1985 ===
| ATP | Lance Tingay | Bud Collins | Rino Tommasi | World Tennis (panel ranking) | John Barrett |
|---|---|---|---|---|---|
| 1. I. Lendl; 2. J. McEnroe; 3. M. Wilander; 4. J. Connors; 5. S. Edberg; 6. B. Becker; 7. Y. Noah; 8. A. Järryd; 9. M. Mečíř; 10. K. Curren (Note: Kevin Curren became a naturalized American citizen in 1985 after representing South Africa.) | 1. I. Lendl; 2. M. Wilander; 3. J. McEnroe; 4. B. Becker; 5. S. Edberg; 6. J. Connors; 7. A. Järryd; 8. K. Curren; 9. Y. Noah; 10. J. Nyström | 1. I. Lendl; 2. B. Becker; 3. M. Wilander; 4. J. McEnroe; 5. S. Edberg; 6. J. Connors; 7. Y. Noah; 8. A. Järryd; 9. K. Curren; 10. J. Nyström | 1. I. Lendl; 2. J. McEnroe; 3. B. Becker; 4. S. Edberg; 5. J. Connors; 6. M. Wilander; 7. Y. Noah; 8. K. Curren; 9. M. Mečíř; 10. T. Mayotte | 1. I. Lendl; 2. M. Wilander; 3. J. McEnroe; 4. B. Becker; 5. S. Edberg; 6. J. Connors; 7. Y. Noah; 8. A. Järryd; 9. J. Nyström; 10. K. Curren | 1. I. Lendl; 2. M. Wilander; 3. S. Edberg; 4. B. Becker; 5. J. McEnroe; 6. J. Connors; 7. A. Järryd; 8. H. Leconte; 9. J. Nyström; 10. H. Gunthardt |

=== 1986 ===
| ATP | Lance Tingay | Bud Collins | Rino Tommasi | World Tennis (panel ranking) | John Barrett |
|---|---|---|---|---|---|
| 1. I. Lendl; 2. B. Becker; 3. M. Wilander; 4. Y. Noah; 5. S. Edberg; 6. H. Leconte; 7. J. Nyström; 8. J. Connors; 9. M. Mečíř; 10. A. Gómez | 1. I. Lendl; 2. B. Becker; 3. H. Leconte; 4. M. Mečíř; 5. S. Edberg; 6. M. Wilander; 7. J. Nyström; 8. A. Gómez; 9. Y. Noah; 10. A. Järryd | 1. I. Lendl; 2. B. Becker; 3. S. Edberg; 4. M. Wilander; 5. J. Nyström; 6. M. Mečíř; 7. Y. Noah; 8. H. Leconte; 9. A. Gómez; 10. B. Gilbert | 1. I. Lendl; 2. B. Becker; 3. M. Wilander; 4. J. McEnroe; 5. J. Nyström; 6. S. Edberg; 7. Y. Noah; 8. H. Leconte; 9. J. Connors; 10. M. Mečíř | 1. I. Lendl; 2. B. Becker; 3. S. Edberg; 4. H. Leconte; 5. M. Wilander; 6. J. Nyström; 7. Y. Noah; 8. M. Mečíř; 9. M. Pernfors; 10. A. Gómez | 1. I. Lendl; 2. B. Becker; 3. S. Edberg; 4. H. Leconte; 5. J. Nyström; 6. M. Mečíř; 7. M. Wilander; 8. Y. Noah; 9. A. Gómez; 10. J. McEnroe |

=== 1987 ===
| ATP | Lance Tingay | Bud Collins | Rino Tommasi | World Tennis (panel ranking) | John Barrett |
|---|---|---|---|---|---|
| 1. I. Lendl; 2. S. Edberg; 3. M. Wilander; 4. J. Connors; 5. B. Becker; 6. M. Mečíř; 7. P. Cash; 8. Y. Noah; 9. T. Mayotte; 10. J. McEnroe | 1. I. Lendl; 2. P. Cash; 3. S. Edberg; 4. M. Wilander; 5. M. Mečíř; 6. B. Becker; 7. J. Connors; 8. A. Gómez; 9. Y. Noah; 10. J. McEnroe | 1. I. Lendl; 2. M. Wilander; 3. S. Edberg; 4. P. Cash; 5. M. Mečíř; 6. B. Becker; 7. J. Connors; 8. T. Mayotte; 9. J. McEnroe; 10. B. Gilbert | 1. I. Lendl; 2. S. Edberg; 3. M. Wilander; 4. M. Mečíř; 5. B. Becker; 6. P. Cash; 7. J. McEnroe; 8. K. Carlsson; 9. Y. Noah; 10. J. Connors | 1. I. Lendl; 2. S. Edberg; 3. M. Wilander; 4. P. Cash; 5. M. Mečíř; 6. B. Becker; 7. J. Connors; 8. T. Mayotte; 9. B. Gilbert; 10. A. Gómez | 1. I. Lendl; 2. S. Edberg; 3. M. Wilander; 4. P. Cash; 5. M. Mečíř; 6. J. Connors; 7. B. Becker; 8. Y. Noah; 9. T. Mayotte; 10. A. Gómez |

=== 1988 ===
| ATP | Lance Tingay | Bud Collins | Rino Tommasi | World Tennis (panel ranking) | John Barrett |
|---|---|---|---|---|---|
| 1. M. Wilander; 2. I. Lendl; 3. A. Agassi; 4. B. Becker; 5. S. Edberg; 6. K. Carlsson; 7. J. Connors; 8. J. Hlasek; 9. H. Leconte; 10. T. Mayotte | 1. M. Wilander; 2. S. Edberg; 3. B. Becker; 4. I. Lendl; 5. M. Mečíř; 6. A. Agassi; 7. H. Leconte; 8. J. Connors; 9. E. Sánchez; 10. P. Cash | 1. M. Wilander; 2. S. Edberg; 3. B. Becker; 4. I. Lendl; 5. A. Agassi; 6. M. Mečíř; 7. J. Connors; 8. T. Mayotte; 9. P. Cash; 10. J. Hlasek | 1. B. Becker; 2. I. Lendl; 3. M. Wilander; 4. A. Agassi; 5. K. Carlsson; 6. S. Edberg; 7. P. Cash; 8. J. Hlasek; 9. J. Connors; 10. Y. Noah | 1. M. Wilander; 2. S. Edberg; 3. B. Becker; 4. I. Lendl; 5. A. Agassi; 6. J. Connors; 7. M. Mečíř; 8. J. Hlasek; 9. T. Mayotte; 10. P. Cash | 1. M. Wilander; 2. S. Edberg; 3. I. Lendl; 4. B. Becker; 5. A. Agassi; 6. T. Mayotte; 7. M. Mečíř; 8. K. Carlsson; 9. P. Cash; 10. H. Leconte |

=== 1989 ===
- Last Tingay ranking before his death.

| ATP | Lance Tingay | Bud Collins | World Tennis (panel ranking) | John Barrett |
|---|---|---|---|---|
| 1. I. Lendl; 2. B. Becker; 3. S. Edberg; 4. J. McEnroe; 5. M. Chang; 6. B. Gilbert; 7. A. Agassi; 8. A. Krickstein; 9. A. Mancini; 10. J. Berger | 1. B. Becker; 2. I. Lendl; 3. M. Chang; 4. S. Edberg; 5. J. McEnroe; 6. T. Mayotte; 7. A. Agassi; 8. B. Gilbert; 9. J. Connors; 10. Y. Noah | 1. B. Becker; 2. I. Lendl; 3. S. Edberg; 4. J. McEnroe; 5. M. Chang; 6. B. Gilbert; 7. A. Krickstein; 8. J. Berger; 9. A. Agassi; 10. J. Connors | 1. B. Becker; 2. I. Lendl; 3. S. Edberg; 4. J. McEnroe; 5. M. Chang; 6. B. Gilbert; 7. A. Krickstein; 8. A. Agassi; 9. J. Berger; 10. A. Mancini | 1. B. Becker; 2. I. Lendl; 3. S. Edberg; 4. J. McEnroe; 5. M. Chang; 6. B. Gilbert; 7. A. Krickstein; 8. M. Mečíř; 9. T. Mayotte; 10. A. Agassi |

=== 1990 ===
| ATP | Bud Collins (Note: Collins & Hollander (1997), p. 652 has Edberg, Lendl and Sampras equal at No. 2, with no No. 1.) | World Tennis (panel ranking); John Barrett |
|---|---|---|
| 1. S. Edberg; 2. B. Becker; 3. I. Lendl; 4. A. Agassi; 5. P. Sampras; 6. A. Gómez; 7. T. Muster; 8. E. Sánchez; 9. G. Ivanišević; 10. B. Gilbert | 1. S. Edberg; 2. I. Lendl; 3. P. Sampras; 4. A. Agassi; 5. B. Becker; 6. T. Muster; 7. A. Gómez; 8. B. Gilbert; 9. M. Chang; 10. J. McEnroe | 1. S. Edberg; 2. I. Lendl; 3. A. Agassi; 4. P. Sampras; 5. B. Becker; 6. A. Gómez; 7. T. Muster; 8. G. Ivanišević; 9. E. Sánchez; 10. J. McEnroe |

=== 1991 ===
| ATP | Bud Collins | John Barrett |
|---|---|---|
| 1. S. Edberg; 2. J. Courier; 3. B. Becker; 4. M. Stich; 5. I. Lendl; 6. P. Sampras; 7. G. Forget; 8. K. Nováček; 9. P. Korda; 10. A. Agassi | 1. S. Edberg; 2. M. Stich; 3. J. Courier; 4. B. Becker; 5. G. Forget; 6. P. Sampras; 7. I. Lendl; 8. A. Agassi; 9. P. Korda; 10. K. Nováček | 1. S. Edberg; 2. J. Courier; 3. B. Becker; 4. M. Stich; 5. I. Lendl; 6. G. Forget; 7. A. Agassi; 8. P. Sampras; 9. K. Nováček; 10. P. Korda |

=== 1992 ===
| ATP | Bud Collins | John Barrett |
|---|---|---|
| 1. J. Courier; 2. S. Edberg; 3. P. Sampras; 4. G. Ivanišević; 5. B. Becker; 6. M. Chang; 7. P. Korda; 8. I. Lendl (Note: Ivan Lendl became a naturalized American citizen in 1992 after representing Czechoslovakia.); 9. A. Agassi; 10. R. Krajicek | 1. J. Courier; 2. S. Edberg; 3. A. Agassi; 4. P. Sampras; 5. M. Chang; 6. G. Ivanišević; 7. P. Korda; 8. B. Becker; 9. W. Ferreira; 10. I. Lendl | 1. J. Courier; 2. S. Edberg; 3. A. Agassi; 4. G. Ivanišević; 5. P. Sampras; 6. Unknown; 7. Unknown; 8. M. Chang; 9. Unknown; 10. Unknown |

=== 1993 ===
| ATP | Bud Collins | John Barrett |
|---|---|---|
| 1. P. Sampras; 2. M. Stich; 3. J. Courier; 4. S. Bruguera; 5. S. Edberg; 6. A. Medvedev; 7. G. Ivanišević; 8. M. Chang; 9. T. Muster; 10. C. Pioline | 1. P. Sampras; 2. J. Courier; 3. S. Bruguera; 4. S. Edberg; 5. M. Stich; 6. T. Muster; 7. A. Medvedev; 8. M. Chang; 9. G. Ivanišević; 10. C. Pioline | 1. P. Sampras; 2. J. Courier; 3. M. Stich; 4. S. Bruguera; 5. S. Edberg; 6. A. Medvedev; 7. M. Chang; 8. G. Ivanišević; 9. C. Pioline; 10. T. Muster |

=== 1994 ===
| ATP | Bud Collins | John Barrett |
|---|---|---|
| 1. P. Sampras; 2. A. Agassi; 3. B. Becker; 4. S. Bruguera; 5. G. Ivanišević; 6. M. Chang; 7. S. Edberg; 8. A. Berasategui; 9. M. Stich; 10. T. Martin | 1. P. Sampras; 2. A. Agassi; 3. S. Bruguera; 4. B. Becker; 5. T. Martin; 6. G. Ivanišević; 7. A. Berasategui; 8. S. Edberg; 9. M. Stich; 10. M. Chang | 1. P. Sampras; 2. A. Agassi; 3. S. Bruguera; 4. B. Becker; 5. T. Martin; 6. G. Ivanišević; 7. M. Chang; 8. M. Stich; 9. S. Edberg; 10. = A. Berasategui = M. Larsson |

=== 1995 ===
| ATP | Bud Collins | John Barrett |
|---|---|---|
| 1. P. Sampras; 2. A. Agassi; 3. T. Muster; 4. B. Becker; 5. M. Chang; 6. Y. Kafelnikov; 7. T. Enqvist; 8. J. Courier; 9. W. Ferreira; 10. G. Ivanišević | 1. P. Sampras; 2. A. Agassi; 3. T. Muster; 4. B. Becker; 5. M. Chang; 6. J. Courier; 7. Y. Kafelnikov; 8. G. Ivanišević; 9. T. Enqvist; 10. W. Ferreira | 1. P. Sampras; 2. A. Agassi; 3. T. Muster; 4. B. Becker; 5. M. Chang; 6. Y. Kafelnikov; 7. T. Enqvist; 8. J. Courier; 9. W. Ferreira; 10. G. Ivanišević |

=== 1996 ===
| ATP | Bud Collins | John Barrett |
|---|---|---|
| 1. P. Sampras; 2. M. Chang; 3. Y. Kafelnikov; 4. G. Ivanišević; 5. T. Muster; 6. B. Becker; 7. R. Krajicek; 8. A. Agassi; 9. T. Enqvist; 10. W. Ferreira | 1. P. Sampras; 2. M. Chang; 3. Y. Kafelnikov; 4. R. Krajicek; 5. B. Becker; 6. T. Muster; 7. G. Ivanišević; 8. A. Agassi; 9. J. Courier; 10. M. Washington | 1. P. Sampras; 2. B. Becker; 3. Y. Kafelnikov; 4. M. Chang; 5. R. Krajicek; 6. A. Agassi; 7. T. Muster; 8. G. Ivanišević; 9. = M. Washington = M. Stich |

=== 1997 ===
| ATP | John Barrett |
|---|---|
| 1. P. Sampras; 2. P. Rafter; 3. M. Chang; 4. J. Björkman; 5. Y. Kafelnikov; 6. G. Rusedski; 7. C. Moyá; 8. S. Bruguera; 9. T. Muster; 10. M. Ríos | 1. P. Sampras; 2. P. Rafter; 3. M. Chang; 4. J. Bjorkman; 5. G. Rusedski; 6. Y. Kafelnikov; 7. C. Moyá; 8. M. Ríos; 9. G. Kuerten; 10. = S. Bruguera = T. Muster |

=== 1998 ===
| ATP | John Barrett |
|---|---|
| 1. P. Sampras; 2. M. Ríos; 3. A. Corretja; 4. P. Rafter; 5. C. Moyá; 6. A. Agassi; 7. T. Henman; 8. K. Kučera; 9. G. Rusedski; 10. R. Krajicek | 1. P. Sampras; 2. M. Ríos; 3. P. Rafter; 4. C. Moyá; 5. A. Corretja; 6. A. Agassi; 7. T. Henman; 8. K. Kučera; 9. G. Rusedski; 10. R. Krajicek |

=== 1999 ===
| ATP | John Barrett |
|---|---|
| 1. A. Agassi; 2. Y. Kafelnikov; 3. P. Sampras; 4. T. Enqvist; 5. G. Kuerten; 6. N. Kiefer; 7. T. Martin; 8. N. Lapentti; 9. M. Ríos; 10. R. Krajicek | 1. A. Agassi; 2. P. Sampras; 3. Y. Kafelnikov; 4. T. Enqvist; 5. G. Kuerten; 6. N. Kiefer; 7. T. Martin; 8. N. Lapentti; 9. M. Ríos; 10. R. Krajicek |

=== 2000 ===
ATP
1. G. Kuerten
2. M. Safin
3. P. Sampras
4. M. Norman
5. Y. Kafelnikov
6. A. Agassi
7. L. Hewitt
8. A. Corretja
9. T. Enqvist
10. T. Henman

=== 2001 ===
ATP
1. L. Hewitt
2. G. Kuerten
3. A. Agassi
4. Y. Kafelnikov
5. JC. Ferrero
6. S. Grosjean
7. P. Rafter
8. T. Haas
9. T. Henman
10. P. Sampras

=== 2002 ===
ATP
1. L. Hewitt
2. A. Agassi
3. M. Safin
4. JC. Ferrero
5. C. Moyá
6. R. Federer
7. J. Novák
8. T. Henman
9. A. Costa
10. A. Roddick

=== 2003 ===
ATP
1. A. Roddick
2. R. Federer
3. JC. Ferrero
4. A. Agassi
5. G. Coria
6. R. Schüttler
7. C. Moyá
8. D. Nalbandian
9. M. Philippoussis
10. S. Grosjean

=== 2004 ===
ATP
1. R. Federer
2. A. Roddick
3. L. Hewitt
4. M. Safin
5. C. Moyá
6. T. Henman
7. G. Coria
8. A. Agassi
9. D. Nalbandian
10. G. Gaudio

=== 2005 ===
ATP
1. R. Federer
2. R. Nadal
3. A. Roddick
4. L. Hewitt
5. N. Davydenko
6. D. Nalbandian
7. A. Agassi
8. G. Coria
9. I. Ljubičić
10. G. Gaudio

=== 2006 ===
ATP
1. R. Federer
2. R. Nadal
3. N. Davydenko
4. J. Blake
5. I. Ljubičić
6. A. Roddick
7. T. Robredo
8. D. Nalbandian
9. M. Ančić
10. F. González

=== 2007 ===
ATP
1. R. Federer
2. R. Nadal
3. N. Djokovic
4. N. Davydenko
5. D. Ferrer
6. A. Roddick
7. F. González
8. R. Gasquet
9. D. Nalbandian
10. T. Robredo

=== 2008 ===
ATP
1. R. Nadal
2. R. Federer
3. N. Djokovic
4. A. Murray
5. N. Davydenko
6. JW. Tsonga
7. G. Simon
8. A. Roddick
9. JM. del Potro
10. J. Blake

=== 2009 ===
ATP
1. R. Federer
2. R. Nadal
3. N. Djokovic
4. A. Murray
5. JM. del Potro
6. N. Davydenko
7. A. Roddick
8. R. Söderling
9. F. Verdasco
10. JW. Tsonga

=== 2010 ===
ATP
1. R. Nadal
2. R. Federer
3. N. Djokovic
4. A. Murray
5. R. Söderling
6. T. Berdych
7. D. Ferrer
8. A. Roddick
9. F. Verdasco
10. M. Youzhny

=== 2011 ===
ATP
1. N. Djokovic
2. R. Nadal
3. R. Federer
4. A. Murray
5. D. Ferrer
6. JW. Tsonga
7. T. Berdych
8. M. Fish
9. J. Tipsarević
10. N. Almagro

=== 2012 ===
ATP
1. N. Djokovic
2. R. Federer
3. A. Murray
4. R. Nadal
5. D. Ferrer
6. T. Berdych
7. JM. del Potro
8. JW. Tsonga
9. J. Tipsarević
10. R. Gasquet

=== 2013 ===
ATP
1. R. Nadal
2. N. Djokovic
3. D. Ferrer
4. A. Murray
5. JM. del Potro
6. R. Federer
7. T. Berdych
8. S. Wawrinka
9. R. Gasquet
10. JW. Tsonga

=== 2014 ===
ATP
1. N. Djokovic
2. R. Federer
3. R. Nadal
4. S. Wawrinka
5. K. Nishikori
6. A. Murray
7. T. Berdych
8. M. Raonic
9. M. Čilić
10. D. Ferrer

=== 2015 ===
ATP
1. N. Djokovic
2. A. Murray
3. R. Federer
4. S. Wawrinka
5. R. Nadal
6. T. Berdych
7. D. Ferrer
8. K. Nishikori
9. R. Gasquet
10. JW. Tsonga

=== 2016 ===
ATP
1. A. Murray
2. N. Djokovic
3. M. Raonic
4. S. Wawrinka
5. K. Nishikori
6. M. Čilić
7. G. Monfils
8. D. Thiem
9. R. Nadal
10. T. Berdych

=== 2017 ===
ATP
1. R. Nadal
2. R. Federer
3. G. Dimitrov
4. A. Zverev
5. D. Thiem
6. M. Čilić
7. D. Goffin
8. J. Sock
9. S. Wawrinka
10. P. Carreño Busta

=== 2018 ===
ATP
1. N. Djokovic
2. R. Nadal
3. R. Federer
4. A. Zverev
5. JM. del Potro
6. K. Anderson
7. M. Čilić
8. D. Thiem
9. K. Nishikori
10. J. Isner

=== 2019 ===
ATP
1. R. Nadal
2. N. Djokovic
3. R. Federer
4. D. Thiem
5. D. Medvedev
6. S. Tsitsipas
7. A. Zverev
8. M. Berrettini
9. R. Bautista Agut
10. G. Monfils

=== 2020 ===
ATP
1. N. Djokovic
2. R. Nadal
3. D. Thiem
4. D. Medvedev
5. R. Federer
6. S. Tsitsipas
7. A. Zverev
8. A. Rublev
9. D. Schwartzman
10. M. Berrettini

=== 2021 ===
ATP
1. N. Djokovic
2. D. Medvedev
3. A. Zverev
4. S. Tsitsipas
5. A. Rublev
6. R. Nadal
7. M. Berrettini
8. C. Ruud
9. H. Hurkacz
10. J. Sinner

=== 2022 ===
ATP
1. C. Alcaraz
2. R. Nadal
3. C. Ruud
4. S. Tsitsipas
5. N. Djokovic
6. F. Auger-Aliassime
7. D. Medvedev
8. A. Rublev
9. T. Fritz
10. H. Hurkacz

=== 2023 ===
ATP
1. N. Djokovic
2. C. Alcaraz
3. D. Medvedev
4. J. Sinner
5. A. Rublev
6. S. Tsitsipas
7. A. Zverev
8. H. Rune
9. H. Hurkacz
10. T. Fritz

=== 2024 ===
ATP
1. J. Sinner
2. A. Zverev
3. C. Alcaraz
4. T. Fritz
5. D. Medvedev
6. C. Ruud
7. N. Djokovic
8. A. Rublev
9. A. de Minaur
10. G. Dimitrov

=== 2025 ===
ATP
1. C. Alcaraz
2. J. Sinner
3. A. Zverev
4. N. Djokovic
5. F. Auger-Aliassime
6. T. Fritz
7. A. de Minaur
8. L. Musetti
9. B. Shelton
10. J. Draper

=== 2026 ===
ATP

== See also ==
- World Championship Tennis § WCT final rankings by year
- Grand Prix tennis circuit § Grand Prix season-end rankings
- World number 1 ranked male tennis players
- List of ATP number 1 ranked singles tennis players
- Top ten ranked female tennis players
- Top ten ranked female tennis players (1921–1974)
