= Top ten ranked female tennis players (1921–1974) =

This article presents top ten lists of female singles tennis players, as ranked by various official and non-official ranking authorities throughout the history of the sport.

The article is split into two sections: 1921–1974, and since 1975 when the first official WTA rankings were published, for ease of navigation.

== Top ten rankings by year ==
=== 1921 ===
A. Wallis Myers (The Daily Telegraph)	B. H. Liddell Hart (The Times)
1. S. Lenglen; 2. M. Bjurstedt Mallory; 3. M. K. Browne; 4. E. Ryan; 5. K. McKane; 6. M. Sutton Bundy; 7. I. Peacock; 8. G. Beamish; 9. E. Goss; 10. M. Zinderstein Jessup	1. S. Lenglen; 2. M. Bjurstedt Mallory; 3. M. K. Browne; 4. E. Ryan; 5. K. McKane; 6. M. Sutton Bundy; 7. I. Peacock; 8. M. Zinderstein Jessup; 9. E. Goss; 10. G. Beamish

=== 1922 ===
A. Wallis Myers
1. S. Lenglen
2. M. Bjurstedt Mallory
3. H. Wills
4. K. McKane
5. G. Beamish
6. I. Peacock
7. E. Ryan
8. M. Zinderstein Jessup
9. M. Sutton Bundy
10. M. Molesworth

=== 1923 ===
A. Wallis Myers	B. H. Liddell Hart
1. S. Lenglen; 2. K. McKane; 3. H. Wills; 4. G. Beamish; 5. M. Bjurstedt Mallory; 6. E. Goss; 7. E. Ryan; 8. J. Vlasto; 9. L. Bancroft; 10. M. Molesworth	1. S. Lenglen; 2. H. Wills; 3. K. McKane; 4. E. Ryan; 5. M. Bjurstedt Mallory; 6. A. Clayton; 7. E. Goss; 8. G. Beamish; 9. P. Covell; 10. G. Golding

=== 1924 ===
A. Wallis Myers
1. S. Lenglen
2. K. McKane
3. H. Wills
4. M. Bjurstedt Mallory
5. M. K. Browne
6. E. Goss
7. E. Ryan
8. P. Satterthwaite
9. M. Zinderstein Jessup
10. S. Lance

=== 1925 ===
A. Wallis Myers	Bill Tilden (American Lawn Tennis)
1. S. Lenglen; 2. H. Wills; 3. K. McKane; 4. E. Ryan; 5. M. Bjurstedt Mallory; 6. E. Goss; 7. D. Douglass Chambers; 8. J. Fry; 9. M. Billout; 10. M. Zinderstein Jessup	1. S. Lenglen; 2. H. Wills; 3. K. McKane; 4. E. Ryan; 5. M. Bjurstedt Mallory; 6. J. Fry; 7. M. K. Browne; 8. M. Billout; 9. M. Zinderstein Jessup; (incomplete)

=== 1926 ===
A. Wallis Myers	Suzanne Lenglen
1. S. Lenglen; 2. K. McKane Godfree; 3. L. de Álvarez; 4. M. Bjurstedt Mallory; 5. E. Ryan; 6. M. K. Browne; 7. J. Fry; 8. P. Holcroft Watson; 9. = M. Zinderstein Jessup = J. Vlasto	1. H. Wills; 2. K. McKane Godfree; 3. M. Bjurstedt Mallory; 4. E. Ryan; 5. M. K. Browne; 6. L. de Álvarez; 7. K. Bouman; 8. J. Fry; 9. J. Vlasto; 10. E. Goss

=== 1927 ===
A. Wallis Myers	Bill Tilden
1. H. Wills; 2. L. de Álvarez; 3. E. Ryan; 4. M. Bjurstedt Mallory; 5. K. McKane Godfree; 6. B. Nuthall; 7. B. Heine; 8. J. Fry; 9. K. Bouman; 10. C. Hosmer Chapin	1. H. Wills; 2. L. de Álvarez; 3. K. Bouman; 4. B. Nuthall; 5. M. Bjurstedt Mallory; 6. J. Fry; 7. B. Heine; 8. E. Ryan; 9. C. Hosmer Chapin; 10. K. McKane Godfree

=== 1928 ===
A. Wallis Myers
1. H. Wills
2. L. de Álvarez
3. D. Akhurst
4. E. Bennett
5. P. Holcroft Watson
6. E. Ryan
7. C. Aussem
8. K. Bouman
9. H. Jacobs
10. E. Boyd

=== 1929 ===
A. Wallis Myers	F. Gordon Lowe (The Scotsman)	Jean Samazeuilh (Le Miroir des sports)
1. H. Wills; 2. P. Holcroft Watson; 3. H. Jacobs; 4. B. Nuthall; 5. B. Heine; 6. S. Passermard Mathieu; 7. E. Bennett; 8. P. von Reznicek; 9. P. Saunders Michell; 10. E. Goldsack	1. H. Wills; 2. L. de Álvarez; 3. P. Holcroft Watson; 4. B. Heine; 5. H. Jacobs; 6. B. Nuthall; 7. S. Passermard Mathieu; 8. E. Bennett; 9. E. Ryan; 10. E. Goldsack	1. H. Wills; 2. P. Holcroft Watson; 3. H. Jacobs; 4. B. Heine; 5. B. Nuthall; 6. S. Passermard Mathieu; 7. E. Bennett; 8. P. von Reznicek; 9. P. Saunders Michell; 10. L. de Álvarez

=== 1930 ===
A. Wallis Myers	Pierre Gillou (L'Auto)	Bill Tilden
1. H. Wills Moody; 2. C. Aussem; 3. P. Holcroft Watson; 4. E. Ryan; 5. S. Passermard Mathieu; 6. H. Jacobs; 7. P. Mudford; 8. L. de Álvarez; 9. B. Nuthall; 10. H. Krahwinkel	1. H. Wills Moody; 2. C. Aussem; 3. S. Passermard Mathieu; 4. E. Ryan; 5. P. Holcroft Watson; 6. H. Jacobs; 7. B. Nuthall; 8. P. Mudford; 9. L. de Álvarez; 10. H. Krahwinkel	1. H. Wills Moody; 2. C. Aussem; 3. E. Ryan; 4. P. Holcroft Watson; 5. H. Jacobs; 6. S. Passermard Mathieu; 7. L. de Álvarez; 8. B. Nuthall; 9. J. Ridley; 10. P. Mudford

=== 1931 ===
A. Wallis Myers	Pierre Gillou	Didier Poulain (L'Auto)	Bill Tilden
1. H. Wills Moody; 2. C. Aussem; 3. E. Bennett Whittingstall; 4. H. Jacobs; 5. B. Nuthall; 6. H. Krahwinkel; 7. S. Passermard Mathieu; 8. L. de Álvarez; 9. P. Mudford; 10. E. Goldsack Pittman	1. H. Wills Moody; 2. C. Aussem; 3. B. Nuthall; 4. H. Jacobs; 5. H. Krahwinkel; 6. S. Passermard Mathieu; 7. E. Bennett Whittingstall; 8. P. Mudford; 9. L. Payot; 10. A. McCune Harper	1. H. Wills Moody; 2. C. Aussem; 3. B. Nuthall; 4. H. Krahwinkel; 5. H. Jacobs; 6. S. Passermard Mathieu; 7. P. Mudford; 8. E. Bennett Whittingstall; 9. J. Ridley; 10. = L. Valerio = J. Sigart	1. H. Wills Moody; 2. C. Aussem; 3. E. Bennett Whittingstall; 4. H. Jacobs; 5. B. Nuthall; 6. H. Krahwinkel; 7. A. McCune Harper; 8. S. Passermard Mathieu; 9. D. Round; 10. P. Mudford

=== 1932 ===
A. Wallis Myers	Pierre Gillou
1. H. Wills Moody; 2. H. Jacobs; 3. S. Passermard Mathieu; 4. L. Payot; 5. H. Krahwinkel; 6. M. Heeley; 7. E. Bennett Whittingstall; 8. M.-L. Horn; 9. K. Stammers; 10. J. Sigart	Only 6 players ranked: 1. H. Wills Moody; 2. H. Jacobs; 3. S. Passermard Mathieu; 4. H. Krahwinkel; 5. L. Payot; 6. M. Heeley

=== 1933 ===
A. Wallis Myers	Pierre Gillou
1. H. Wills Moody; 2. H. Jacobs; 3. D. Round; 4. H. Krahwinkel; 5. M. Scriven; 6. S. Passermard Mathieu; 7. S. Palfrey; 8. B. Nuthall; 9. L. Payot; 10. A. Marble	1. H. Wills Moody; 2. H. Jacobs; 3. D. Round; 4. M. Scriven; 5. S. Passermard Mathieu; 6. H. Krahwinkel; 7. S. Palfrey; 8. B. Nuthall; 9. L. Payot; 10. S. Jung Henrotin

=== 1934 ===
A. Wallis Myers	Pierre Gillou	Ned Potter (American Lawn Tennis)
1. D. Round; 2. H. Jacobs; 3. H. Krahwinkel Sperling; 4. S. Palfrey; 5. M. Scriven; 6. S. Passermard Mathieu; 7. L. Payot; 8. J. Hartigan; 9. C. Aussem; 10. C. Babcock	1. D. Round; 2. H. Jacobs; 3. M. Scriven; 4. S. Passermard Mathieu; 5. J. Hartigan; 6. S. Palfrey; 7. H. Krahwinkel Sperling; 8. L. Payot; 9. C. Babcock; 10. M. Rollin Couquerque	1. H. Jacobs; 2. D. Round; 3. S. Palfrey; 4. M. Scriven; 5. S. Passermard Mathieu; 6. J. Hartigan; 7. H. Krahwinkel Sperling; 8. L. Payot; 9. C. Babcock; 10. C. Aussem

=== 1935 ===
A. Wallis Myers	Pierre Gillou	Ned Potter	The Times
1. H. Wills Moody; 2. H. Jacobs; 3. K. Stammers; 4. H. Krahwinkel Sperling; 5. S. Palfrey Fabyan; 6. D. Round; 7. M. Arnold; 8. S. Passermard Mathieu; 9. J. Hartigan; 10. M. Scriven	1. H. Wills Moody; 2. H. Jacobs; 3. H. Krahwinkel Sperling; 4. J. Hartigan; 5. S. Passermard Mathieu; 6. K. Stammers; 7. D. Round; 8. S. Palfrey Fabyan; 9. M. Arnold; 10. J. Jędrzejowska	1. H. Wills Moody; 2. H. Krahwinkel Sperling; 3. H. Jacobs; 4. S. Passermard Mathieu; 5. K. Stammers; 6. M. Arnold; 7. D. Round; 8. S. Palfrey Fabyan; 9. J. Hartigan; 10. P. Mudford King	1. H. Wills Moody; 2. H. Jacobs; 3. H. Krahwinkel Sperling; 4. K. Stammers; 5. S. Passermard Mathieu; 6. D. Round; 7. S. Palfrey Fabyan; 8. M. Scriven; 9. J. Hartigan; 10. J. Jędrzejowska

=== 1936 ===
A. Wallis Myers	Pierre Gillou	Ned Potter	The Times	Harry Hopman (Melbourne Herald)	Mervyn Weston (The Australasian)	Fred Perry
1. H. Jacobs; 2. H. Krahwinkel Sperling; 3. D. Round; 4. A. Marble; 5. S. Passermard Mathieu; 6. J. Jędrzejowska; 7. K. Stammers; 8. A. Lizana; 9. S. Palfrey Fabyan; 10. C. Babcock	1. H. Jacobs; 2. H. Krahwinkel Sperling; 3. A. Marble; 4. S. Passermard Mathieu; 5. D. Round; 6. K. Stammers; 7. J. Jędrzejowska; 8. S. Palfrey Fabyan; 9. A. Lizana; 10. M.-L. Horn	1. H. Krahwinkel Sperling; 2. H. Jacobs; 3. A. Marble; 4. D. Round; 5. S. Passermard Mathieu; 6. J. Jędrzejowska; 7. L. de Álvarez; 8. K. Stammers; 9. A. Lizana; 10. C. Babcock	1. H. Jacobs; 2. H. Krahwinkel Sperling; 3. K. Stammers; 4. A. Marble; 5. D. Round; 6. J. Jędrzejowska; 7. A. Lizana; 8. S. Palfrey Fabyan; 9. L. de Álvarez	1. H. Jacobs; 2. H. Krahwinkel Sperling; 3. K. Stammers; 4. A. Marble; 5. D. Round; 6. J. Jędrzejowska; 7. A. Lizana; 8. S. Passermard Mathieu; 9. S. Palfrey Fabyan	1. H. Jacobs; 2. H. Krahwinkel Sperling; 3. A. Marble; 4. S. Passermard Mathieu; 5. D. Round; 6. J. Jędrzejowska; 7. K. Stammers; 8. A. Lizana; 9. S. Palfrey Fabyan; 10. M.-L. Horn	1. H. Jacobs; 2. H. Krahwinkel Sperling; 3. D. Round; 4. A. Marble; 5. K. Stammers; 6. J. Jędrzejowska; 7. S. Passermard Mathieu; 8. S. Palfrey Fabyan; 9. A. Lizana; 10. C. Babcock

=== 1937 ===
A. Wallis Myers	Pierre Gillou	Ned Potter	The Times	Harry Hopman	Mervyn Weston	Alfred Chave (Brisbane Telegraph)
1. A. Lizana; 2. D. Round Little; 3. J. Jędrzejowska; 4. H. Krahwinkel Sperling; 5. S. Passermard Mathieu; 6. H. Jacobs; 7. A. Marble; 8. M.-L. Horn; 9. M. Hardwick; 10. D. Bundy	1. D. Round Little; 2. H. Krahwinkel Sperling; 3. S. Passermard Mathieu; 4. A. Lizana; 5. J. Jędrzejowska; 6. A. Marble; 7. D. Bundy; 8. H. Jacobs; 9. N. Wynne; 10. M.-L. Horn	1. A. Lizana; 2. D. Round Little; 3. H. Krahwinkel Sperling; 4. S. Passermard Mathieu; 5. J. Jędrzejowska; 6. A. Marble; 7. D. Bundy; 8. H. Jacobs; 9. M.-L. Horn; 10. M. Hardwick	1. D. Round Little; 2. A. Lizana; 3. J. Jędrzejowska; 4. A. Marble; 5. H. Krahwinkel Sperling; 6. S. Passermard Mathieu; 7. H. Jacobs; 8. D. Bundy; 9. M. Scriven; 10. M.-L. Horn	1. D. Round Little; 2. J. Jędrzejowska; 3. A. Lizana; 4. H. Krahwinkel Sperling; 5. A. Marble; 6. S. Passermard Mathieu; 7. H. Jacobs; 8. M. Hardwick; 9. M. Scriven; 10. D. Bundy	1. D. Round Little; 2. A. Lizana; 3. J. Jędrzejowska; 4. H. Krahwinkel Sperling; 5. S. Passermard Mathieu; 6. A. Marble; 7. H. Jacobs; 8. M. Hardwick; 9. M. Scriven; 10. K. Stammers	1. D. Round Little; 2. J. Jędrzejowska; 3. A. Lizana; 4. S. Passermard Mathieu; 5. A. Marble; 6. H. Krahwinkel Sperling; 7. H. Jacobs; 8. M. Scriven; 9. K. Stammers; 10. S. Noel

=== 1938 ===
- Last ranking by Wallis Myers before his death.

A. Wallis Myers	Pierre Gillou	Ned Potter	F. Gordon Lowe	The Times	American Lawn Tennis	Mervyn Weston	Pierre Goldschmidt (L'Auto)	Alfred Chave	G. H. McElhone (The Sydney Morning Herald)	"International" (The Referee).
1. H. Wills Moody; 2. H. Jacobs; 3. A. Marble; 4. H. Krahwinkel Sperling; 5. S. Passermard Mathieu; 6. J. Jędrzejowska; 7. S. Palfrey Fabyan; 8. B. Heine Miller; 9. K. Stammers; 10. N. Wynne	1. H. Wills Moody; 2. H. Krahwinkel Sperling; 3. A. Marble; 4. H. Jacobs; 5. S. Palfrey Fabyan; 6. J. Jędrzejowska; 7. D. Bundy; 8. S. Passermard Mathieu; 9. N. Wynne; 10. M. Lumb	1. H. Wills Moody; 2. A. Marble; 3. H. Krahwinkel Sperling; 4. H. Jacobs; 5. J. Jędrzejowska; 6. M. Scriven; 7. N. Wynne; 8. S. Palfrey Fabyan; 9. M. Lumb; 10. S. Passermard Mathieu	1. H. Wills Moody; 2. A. Marble; 3. H. Krahwinkel Sperling; 4. H. Jacobs; 5. S. Palfrey Fabyan; 6. S. Passermard Mathieu; 7. N. Wynne; 8. M. Lumb; 9. D. Bundy; 10. J. Jędrzejowska	1. H. Wills Moody; 2. A. Marble; 3. H. Jacobs; 4. H. Krahwinkel Sperling; 5. S. Palfrey Fabyan; 6. S. Passermard Mathieu; 7. N. Wynne; 8. D. Bundy; 9. M. Lumb; 10. J. Jędrzejowska	1. H. Wills Moody; 2. A. Marble; 3. H. Jacobs; 4. H. Krahwinkel Sperling; 5. S. Palfrey Fabyan; 6. J. Jędrzejowska; 7. N. Wynne; 8. D. Bundy; 9. S. Passermard Mathieu; 10. M. Lumb	1. H. Wills Moody; 2. A. Marble; 3. H. Krahwinkel Sperling; 4. H. Jacobs; 5. S. Palfrey Fabyan; 6. J. Jędrzejowska; 7. N. Wynne; 8. S. Passermard Mathieu; 9. M. Lumb; 10. D. Bundy	1. H. Wills Moody; 2. A. Marble; 3. H. Jacobs; 4. H. Krahwinkel Sperling; 5. S. Palfrey Fabyan; 6. N. Wynne; 7. J. Jędrzejowska; 8. D. Bundy; 9. S. Passermard Mathieu; 10. M. Hardwick	1. H. Wills Moody; 2. H. Jacobs; 3. S. Passermard Mathieu; 4. A. Marble; 5. H. Krahwinkel Sperling; 6. M. Lumb; 7. S. Palfrey Fabyan; 8. N. Wynne; 9. D. Bundy; 10. J. Jędrzejowska	1. H. Wills Moody; 2. A. Marble; 3. H. Krahwinkel Sperling; 4. H. Jacobs; 5. J. Jędrzejowska; 6. N. Wynne; 7. S. Palfrey Fabyan; 8. D. Bundy; 9. S. Passermard Mathieu; 10. K. Stammers	1. H. Wills Moody; 2. A. Marble; 3. H. Krahwinkel Sperling; 4. H. Jacobs; 5. S. Palfrey Fabyan; 6. S. Passermard Mathieu; 7. N. Wynne; 8. J. Jędrzejowska; 9. D. Bundy; 10. K. Stammers

=== 1939 ===
American Lawn Tennis	Pierre Gillou	Ned Potter	F. Gordon Lowe	The Times	Alfred Chave	G. H. McElhone
1. A. Marble; 2. K. Stammers; 3. H. Jacobs; 4. J. Jędrzejowska; 5. S. Palfrey Fabyan; 6. S. Passermard Mathieu; 7. V. Scott; 8. H. Krahwinkel Sperling; 9. M. Hardwick; 10. M. Scriven	1. A. Marble; 2. K. Stammers; 3. H. Jacobs; 4. S. Palfrey Fabyan; 5. H. Krahwinkel Sperling; 6. S. Passermard Mathieu; 7. M. Hardwick; 8. J. Jędrzejowska; 9. V. Scott; 10. V. Wolfenden	1. A. Marble; 2. H. Jacobs; 3. K. Stammers; 4. S. Palfrey Fabyan; 5. J. Jędrzejowska; 6. S. Passermard Mathieu; 7. V. Scott; 8. H. Krahwinkel Sperling; 9. M. Hardwick; 10. M. Scriven	1. A. Marble; 2. K. Stammers; 3. H. Jacobs; 4. H. Krahwinkel Sperling; 5. S. Passermard Mathieu; 6. S. Palfrey Fabyan; 7. J. Jędrzejowska; 8. M. Hardwick; 9. V. Scott; 10. V. Wolfenden	1. A. Marble; 2. K. Stammers; 3. H. Jacobs; 4. H. Krahwinkel Sperling; 5. S. Passermard Mathieu; 6. J. Jędrzejowska; 7. S. Palfrey Fabyan; 8. M. Hardwick; 9. V. Scott; 10. D. Bundy	1. A. Marble; 2. K. Stammers; 3. H. Jacobs; 4. S. Palfrey Fabyan; 5. S. Passermard Mathieu; 6. J. Jędrzejowska; 7. H. Krahwinkel Sperling; 8. F. James Hammersley; 9. D. Bundy; 10. D. Round Little	1. A. Marble; 2. K. Stammers; 3. H. Jacobs; 4. S. Passermard Mathieu; 5. = J. Jędrzejowska = S. Palfrey Fabyan; 7. H. Krahwinkel Sperling; 8. M. Hardwick; 9. E. Hood Westacott; 10. V. Scott

=== 1940–1945 ===
no world rankings (World War II)

=== 1946 ===
Pierre Gillou; Ned Potter	Harry Hopman
1. P. Betz; 2. M. Osborne; 3. L. Brough; 4. D. Hart; 5. P. Canning Todd; 6. D. Bundy; 7. N. Adamson Landry; 8. K. Stammers Menzies; 9. S. Fry; 10. V. Wolfenden Kovacs	1. P. Betz; 2. M. Osborne; 3. L. Brough; 4. D. Hart; 5. N. Wynne Bolton; 6. P. Canning Todd; 7. D. Bundy; 8. J. Bostock; 9. K. Stammers Menzies; 10. N. Adamson Landry

=== 1947 ===
Pierre Gillou	Ned Potter	John Olliff (The Daily Telegraph)
1. M. Osborne duPont; 2. L. Brough; 3. D. Hart; 4. N. Wynne Bolton; 5. P. Canning Todd; 6. S. Piercey Summers; 7. M. Rurac; 8. M. Arnold Prentiss; 9. S. Fry; 10. J. Bostock	1. L. Brough; 2. N. Wynne Bolton; 3. M. Osborne duPont; 4. D. Hart; 5. S. Piercey Summers; 6. P. Canning Todd; 7. M. Rurac; 8. J. Bostock; 9. M. Arnold Prentiss; 10. Z Körmöczy	1. M. Osborne duPont; 2. L. Brough; 3. D. Hart; 4. N. Wynne Bolton; 5. P. Canning Todd; 6. S. Piercey Summers; 7. J. Bostock; 8. B. Krase; 9. B. Hilton; 10. M. Rurac

=== 1948 ===
Pierre Gillou	Ned Potter	John Olliff
1. L. Brough; 2. M. Osborne duPont; 3. D. Hart; 4. P. Canning Todd; 5. N. Wynne Bolton; 6. G. Moran; 7. N. Adamson Landry; 8. S. Fry; 9. J. Bostock; 10. B. Hilton	1. M. Osborne duPont; 2. L. Brough; 3. D. Hart; 4. P. Canning Todd; 5. G. Moran; 6. J. Bostock; 7. Z Körmöczy; 8. N. Adamson Landry; 9. S. Fry; 10. V. Wolfenden Kovacs	1. M. Osborne duPont; 2. L. Brough; 3. D. Hart; 4. N. Wynne Bolton; 5. P. Canning Todd; 6. J. Bostock; 7. S. Piercey Summers; 8. S. Fry; 9. M. Rurac; 10. N. Adamson Landry

=== 1949 ===
Pierre Gillou	Ned Potter	John Olliff
1. M. Osborne duPont; 2. L. Brough; 3. D. Hart; 4. P. Canning Todd; 5. B. Hilton; 6. G. Moran; 7. H. Pastall Perez; 8. S. Fry; 9. B. Baker; 10. J. Walker-Smith	1. M. Osborne duPont; 2. L. Brough; 3. D. Hart; 4. H. Pastall Perez; 5. P. Canning Todd; 6. S. Fry; 7. G. Moran; 8. B. Baker; 9. D. Head; 10. B. Hilton	1. M. Osborne duPont; 2. L. Brough; 3. D. Hart; 4. N. Wynne Bolton; 5. P. Canning Todd; 6. B. Hilton; 7. S. Piercey Summers; 8. A. Ullstein Bossi; 9. J. Curry; 10. J. Walker-Smith

=== 1950 ===
- Last Olliff ranking before his death.

Ned Potter	John Olliff
1. M. Osborne duPont; 2. D. Hart; 3. L. Brough; 4. P. Canning Todd; 5. S. Fry; 6. N. Chaffee; 7. J. Walker-Smith; 8. B. Baker; 9. B. Scofield; 10. B. Harrison (née Hilton)	1. M. Osborne duPont; 2. L. Brough; 3. D. Hart; 4. P. Canning Todd; 5. B. Scofield; 6. N. Chaffee; 7. B. Baker; 8. S. Fry; 9. A. Ullstein Bossi; 10. M. T. de Weiss

=== 1951 ===
Pierre Gillou	Ned Potter
1. D. Hart; 2. M. Connolly; 3. S. Fry; 4. N. Chaffee Kiner; 5. J. Walker-Smith; 6. J. Quertier; 7. L. Brough; 8. B. Baker Fleitz; 9. P. Canning Todd; 10. K. Tuckey Maule	1. D. Hart; 2. S. Fry; 3. M. Connolly; 4. N. Chaffee Kiner; 5. J. Walker-Smith; 6. P. Canning Todd; 7. B. Baker Fleitz; 8. L. Brough; 9. M. Osborne duPont; 10. K. Tuckey Maule

=== 1952 ===
Ned Potter	Lance Tingay (The Daily Telegraph)
1. M. Connolly; 2. D. Hart; 3. S. Fry; 4. L. Brough; 5. N. Chaffee Kiner; 6. P. Canning Todd; 7. J. Walker-Smith; 8. D. Head Knode; 9. A. Mortimer; 10. A. Kanter	1. M. Connolly; 2. D. Hart; 3. L. Brough; 4. S. Fry; 5. P. Canning Todd; 6. N. Chaffee Kiner; 7. T. Coyne Long; 8. J. Walker-Smith; 9. J. Quertier-Rinkel; 10. D. Head Knode

=== 1953 ===
Ned Potter (Note: Revision of ranking from November 1953.) (World Tennis)	Lance Tingay
1. M. Connolly; 2. D. Hart; 3. S. Fry; 4. L. Brough; 5. M. Osborne duPont; 6. D. Head Knode; 7. T. Coyne Long; 8. A. Mortimer; 9. H. Fletcher; 10. A. Gibson	1. M. Connolly; 2. D. Hart; 3. L. Brough; 4. S. Fry; 5. M. Osborne duPont; 6. D. Head Knode; 7. Z Körmöczy; 8. A. Mortimer; 9. H. Fletcher; 10. J. Quertier-Rinkel

=== 1954 ===
Ned Potter	Lance Tingay	New York Times (panel of experts)
1. M. Connolly; 2. D. Hart; 3. B. Baker Fleitz; 4. L. Brough; 5. B. Rosenquest Pratt; 6. S. Fry; 7. B. Breit; 8. D. Hard; 9. A. Mortimer; 10. J. Mottram	1. M. Connolly; 2. D. Hart; 3. B. Baker Fleitz; 4. L. Brough; 5. M. Osborne duPont; 6. S. Fry; 7. B. Rosenquest Pratt; 8. H. Fletcher; 9. A. Mortimer; 10. = G. Bucaille = T. Coyne Long	1. M. Connolly; 2. D. Hart; 3. L. Brough; 4. M. Osborne duPont; 5. S. Fry; 6. B. Rosenquest Pratt; 7. B. Baker Fleitz; 8. H. Fletcher; 9. A. Mortimer; 10. J. Mottram

=== 1955 ===
Ned Potter	Lance Tingay	L'Équipe
1. D. Hart; 2. L. Brough; 3. B. Baker Fleitz; 4. A. Mortimer; 5. B. Penrose; 6. P. Ward; 7. D. Head Knode; 8. B. Breit; 9. D. Hard; 10. S. Fry	1. L. Brough; 2. D. Hart; 3. B. Baker Fleitz; 4. A. Mortimer; 5. D. Head Knode; 6. B. Breit; 7. D. Hard; 8. B. Penrose; 9. P. Ward; 10. = Z Körmöczy = S. Fry	1. D. Hart; 2. L. Brough; 3. B. Baker Fleitz; 4. D. Head Knode; 5. D. Hard; 6. P. Ward; 7. B. Breit; 8. S. Bloomer; 9. A. Buxton; 10. = S. Fry = A. Mortimer

=== 1956 ===
Ned Potter	Lance Tingay
1. S. Fry; 2. A. Gibson; 3. A. Mortimer; 4. L. Brough; 5. A. Buxton; 6. S. Bloomer; 7. B. Rosenquest Pratt; 8. Z Körmöczy; 9. D. Head Knode; 10. T. Coyne Long	1. S. Fry; 2. A. Gibson; 3. L. Brough; 4. A. Mortimer; 5. Z Körmöczy; 6. A. Buxton; 7. S. Bloomer; 8. P. Ward; 9. B. Rosenquest Pratt; 10. = D. Hard = M. Osborne duPont

=== 1957 ===
Ned Potter	Lance Tingay	British Lawn Tennis (readers' poll)
1. A. Gibson; 2. L. Brough; 3. D. Head Knode; 4. S. Bloomer; 5. D. Hard; 6. K. Fageros; 7. C. Truman; 8. A. Haydon; 9. A. Mortimer; 10. T. Coyne Long	1. A. Gibson; 2. D. Hard; 3. S. Bloomer; 4. L. Brough; 5. D. Head Knode; 6. V. Pužejová; 7. A. Haydon; 8. Y. Ramírez; 9. C. Truman; 10. M. Osborne duPont	1. A. Gibson; 2. D. Hard; 3. S. Bloomer; 4. L. Brough; 5. D. Head Knode; 6. A. Haydon; 7. V. Pužejová; 8. C. Truman; 9. Y. Ramírez; 10. Z Körmöczy

=== 1958 ===
Ned Potter	Lance Tingay	British Lawn Tennis (readers' poll)
1. A. Gibson; 2. B. Baker Fleitz; 3. Z Körmöczy; 4. D. Hard; 5. A. Mortimer; 6. D. Head Knode; 7. C. Truman; 8. M. Bueno; 9. S. Bloomer; 10. L. Coghlan	1. A. Gibson; 2. Z Körmöczy; 3. B. Baker Fleitz; 4. D. Hard; 5. S. Bloomer; 6. C. Truman; 7. A. Mortimer; 8. A. Haydon; 9. M. Bueno; 10. D. Head Knode	1. A. Gibson; 2. B. Baker Fleitz; 3. Z Körmöczy; 4. D. Hard; 5. A. Mortimer; 6. C. Truman; 7. S. Bloomer; 8. M. Bueno; 9. A. Haydon; 10. D. Head Knode

=== 1959 ===
Ned Potter	Lance Tingay	British Lawn Tennis (readers' poll)
1. M. Bueno; 2. C. Truman; 3. B. Baker Fleitz; 4. S. Reynolds; 5. A. Mortimer; 6. D. Hard; 7. A. Haydon; 8. R. Schuurman; 9. Y. Ramírez; 10. D. Head Knode	1. M. Bueno; 2. C. Truman; 3. D. Hard; 4. B. Baker Fleitz; 5. S. Reynolds; 6. A. Mortimer; 7. A. Haydon; 8. Z Körmöczy; 9. S. Moore; 10. Y. Ramírez	1. M. Bueno; 2. C. Truman; 3. B. Baker Fleitz; 4. D. Hard; 5. A. Mortimer; 6. S. Reynolds; 7. A. Haydon; 8. Y. Ramírez; 9. S. Moore; 10. Z Körmöczy

=== 1960 ===
Ned Potter	Lance Tingay
1. M. Bueno; 2. D. Hard; 3. A. Haydon; 4. C. Truman; 5. S. Reynolds; 6. Z Körmöczy; 7. A. Mortimer; 8. J. Lehane; 9. K. Hantze; 10. D. Head Knode	1. M. Bueno; 2. D. Hard; 3. S. Reynolds; 4. C. Truman; 5. Z Körmöczy; 6. A. Haydon; 7. A. Mortimer; 8. J. Lehane; 9. Y. Ramírez; 10. R. Schuurman

=== 1961 ===
Ned Potter	Lance Tingay	British Lawn Tennis (readers' poll)	Denis Lalanne (L'Équipe)
1. A. Mortimer; 2. M. Smith; 3. A. Haydon; 4. C. Truman; 5. D. Hard; 6. K. Hantze; 7. S. Reynolds; 8. Y. Ramírez; 9. E. Buding; 10. L. Turner	1. A. Mortimer; 2. D. Hard; 3. A. Haydon; 4. M. Smith; 5. S. Reynolds; 6. Y. Ramírez; 7. C. Truman; 8. Z Körmöczy; 9. R. Schuurman; 10. K. Hantze	1. A. Mortimer; 2. D. Hard; 3. A. Haydon; 4. M. Smith; 5. S. Reynolds; 6. C. Truman; 7. Y. Ramírez; 8. K. Hantze; 9. Z Körmöczy; 10. R. Schuurman	1. A. Mortimer; 2. M. Smith; 3. A. Haydon; 4. C. Truman; 5. D. Hard; 6. S. Reynolds; 7. K. Hantze; 8. Y. Ramírez; 9. Z Körmöczy; 10. E. Buding

=== 1962 ===
Ned Potter	Lance Tingay	British Lawn Tennis (readers' poll)	Ulrich Kaiser (panel of 13 experts)	Margaret Smith
1. M. Smith; 2. M. Bueno; 3. D. Hard; 4. K. Hantze Susman; 5. R. Schuurman; 6. A. Haydon; 7. V. Pužejová Sukova; 8. S. Reynolds Price; 9. C. Caldwell; 10. B. J. Moffitt	1. M. Smith; 2. M. Bueno; 3. D. Hard; 4. K. Hantze Susman; 5. V. Pužejová Sukova; 6. S. Reynolds Price; 7. L. Turner; 8. A. Haydon; 9. R. Schuurman; 10. A. Mortimer	1. M. Smith; 2. M. Bueno; 3. D. Hard; 4. K. Hantze Susman; 5. R. Schuurman; 6. A. Haydon; 7. V. Pužejová Sukova; 8. S. Reynolds Price; 9. L. Turner; 10. A. Mortimer	1. M. Smith; 2. M. Bueno; 3. D. Hard; 4. K. Hantze Susman; 5. V. Pužejová Sukova; 6. R. Schuurman; 7. A. Haydon; 8. S. Reynolds Price; 9. L. Turner; 10. B. J. Moffitt	1. M. Bueno; 2. D. Hard; 3. K. Hantze Susman; 4. V. Pužejová Sukova; 5. R. Schuurman; 6. A. Haydon; 7. S. Reynolds Price; 8. L. Turner; 9. B. J. Moffitt; (didn't rank herself)

=== 1963 ===
Ned Potter	Lance Tingay	British Lawn Tennis (readers' poll)	Ulrich Kaiser (panel of 13 experts)
1. M. Smith; 2. M. Bueno; 3. L. Turner; 4. D. Hard; 5. B. J. Moffitt; 6. A. Haydon Jones; 7. J. Lehane; 8. V. Pužejová Sukova; 9. R. Schuurman; 10. R. Ebbern	1. M. Smith; 2. L. Turner; 3. M. Bueno; 4. B. J. Moffitt; 5. A. Haydon Jones; 6. D. Hard; 7. J. Lehane; 8. R. Schuurman; 9. N. Richey; 10. V. Pužejová Sukova	1. M. Smith; 2. M. Bueno; 3. L. Turner; 4. B. J. Moffitt; 5. A. Haydon Jones; 6. D. Hard; 7. J. Lehane; 8. R. Schuurman; 9. C. Truman; 10. V. Pužejová Sukova	1. M. Smith; 2. M. Bueno; 3. L. Turner; 4. D. Hard; 5. B. J. Moffitt; 6. A. Haydon Jones; 7. J. Lehane; 8. R. Schuurman; 9. V. Pužejová Sukova; 10. R. Ebbern

=== 1964 ===
Ned Potter	Lance Tingay	British Lawn Tennis (readers' poll)	Ulrich Kaiser (panel of 14 experts)	Margaret Smith
1. M. Bueno; 2. M. Smith; 3. L. Turner; 4. N. Richey; 5. B. J. King (née Moffitt); 6. C. Caldwell Graebner; 7. K. Hantze Susman; 8. J. Lehane; 9. C. Hanks; 10. A. Haydon Jones	1. M. Smith; 2. M. Bueno; 3. L. Turner; 4. C. Caldwell Graebner; 5. H. Schultze; 6. N. Richey; 7. B. J. Moffitt; 8. K. Hantze Susman; 9. R. Ebbern; 10. J. Lehane	1. M. Bueno; 2. M. Smith; 3. L. Turner; 4. B. J. Moffitt; 5. N. Richey; 6. K. Hantze Susman; 7. C. Caldwell Graebner; 8. A. Haydon Jones; 9. R. Ebbern; 10. J. Lehane	1. M. Bueno; 2. M. Smith; 3. L. Turner; 4. B. J. Moffitt; 5. R. Ebbern; 6. N. Richey; 7. C. Caldwell Graebner; 8. A. Haydon Jones; 9. J. Lehane; 10. K. Hantze Susman	1. M. Bueno; 2. L. Turner; 3. A. Haydon Jones; 4. B. J. Moffitt; 5. N. Richey; 6. H. Schultze; 7. K. Hantze Susman; 8. C. Caldwell Graebner; 9. N. Baylon; 10. F. Dürr; (didn't rank herself)

=== 1965 ===
- Last ranking by Potter for World Tennis magazine.

Ned Potter	Lance Tingay	British Lawn Tennis (readers' poll)	Ulrich Kaiser (panel of 16 experts)	Sport za Rubezhom
1. M. Smith; 2. M. Bueno; 3. N. Richey; 4. B. J. King; 5. L. Turner; 6. A. Van Zyl; 7. C. Truman; 8. A. Haydon Jones; 9. C. Caldwell Graebner; 10. F. Dürr	1. M. Smith; 2. M. Bueno; 3. L. Turner; 4. B. J. King; 5. A. Haydon Jones; 6. A. Van Zyl; 7. C. Truman; 8. N. Richey; 9. C. Caldwell Graebner; 10. F. Dürr	1. M. Smith; 2. M. Bueno; 3. B. J. King; 4. L. Turner; 5. A. Haydon Jones; 6. N. Richey; 7. A. Van Zyl; 8. C. Truman; 9. C. Caldwell Graebner; 10. F. Dürr	1. M. Smith; 2. M. Bueno; 3. B. J. King; 4. L. Turner; 5. N. Richey; 6. A. Van Zyl; 7. A. Haydon Jones; 8. C. Truman; 9. F. Dürr; 10. C. Caldwell Graebner	1. M. Smith; 2. M. Bueno; 3. L. Turner; 4. B. J. King; 5. N. Richey; 6. A. Haydon Jones; 7. C. Caldwell Graebner; 8. A. Van Zyl; 9. N. Baylon; 10. F. Dürr

=== 1966 ===
Lance Tingay	British Lawn Tennis (readers' poll)	Joseph McCauley (World Tennis)	Bruce Walkley (Herald Sun)	Pierre de Thier	Sport In The USSR
1. B. J. King; 2. M. Smith; 3. M. Bueno; 4. A. Haydon Jones; 5. N. Richey; 6. A. Van Zyl; 7. N. Baylon; 8. F. Dürr; 9. R. Casals; 10. K. Melville	1. M. Bueno; 2. M. Smith; 3. B. J. King; 4. A. Haydon Jones; 5. N. Richey; 6. A. Van Zyl; 7. F. Dürr; 8. N. Baylon; 9. R. Casals; 10. V. Wade	1. B. J. King; 2. M. Bueno; 3. A. Haydon Jones; 4. M. Smith; 5. N. Richey; 6. A. Van Zyl; 7. R. Casals; 8. N. Baylon; 9. V. Wade; 10. F. Dürr	1. M. Bueno; 2. N. Richey; 3. M. Smith; 4. B. J. King; 5. A. Haydon Jones; 6. A. Van Zyl; 7. F. Dürr; 8. C. Caldwell Graebner; 9. K. Melville; 10. R. Casals	1. B. J. King; 2. M. Smith; 3. M. Bueno; 4. A. Haydon Jones; 5. N. Richey; 6. A. Van Zyl; 7. R. Casals; 8. K. Melville; 9. F. Dürr; 10. N. Baylon	1. B. J. King; 2. M. Bueno; 3. M. Smith; 4. A. Haydon Jones; 5. N. Richey; 6. F. Dürr; 7. A. Van Zyl; 8. H. Niessen; 9. G. Baksheeva; 10. C. Caldwell Graebner

=== 1967 ===
- The last British Lawn Tennis readers' poll.

Lance Tingay	British Lawn Tennis (readers' poll)	Ulrich Kaiser (panel of 13 experts)	Joseph McCauley
1. B. J. King; 2. A. Haydon Jones; 3. F. Dürr; 4. N. Richey; 5. L. Turner; 6. R. Casals; 7. M. Bueno; 8. V. Wade; 9. K. Melville; 10. J. Tegart	1. B. J. King; 2. A. Haydon Jones; 3. F. Dürr; 4. N. Richey; 5. L. Turner; 6. R. Casals; 7. M. Bueno; 8. V. Wade; 9. J. Tegart; 10. K. Melville	1. B. J. King; 2. A. Haydon Jones; 3. F. Dürr; 4. L. Turner; 5. N. Richey; 6. R. Casals; 7. M. Bueno; 8. K. Melville; 9. V. Wade; 10. J. Tegart	1. B. J. King; 2. A. Haydon Jones; 3. F. Dürr; 4. L. Turner; 5. N. Richey; 6. R. Casals; 7. M. Bueno; 8. V. Wade; 9. K. Melville; 10. J. Tegart

=== 1968 ===
Lance Tingay	Ulrich Kaiser (panel of 18 experts)	Joseph McCauley; Seagram's (panel of experts)	Bud Collins (The Boston Globe)	Rino Tommasi (La Gazzetta dello Sport)	The Times
1. B. J. King; 2. V. Wade; 3. N. Richey; 4. M. Bueno; 5. M. Smith Court; 6. A. Haydon Jones; 7. J. Tegart; 8. A. Van Zyl duPlooy; 9. L. Turner Bowrey; 10. R. Casals	1. B. J. King; 2. V. Wade; 3. = A. Haydon Jones = N. Richey; 5. M. Smith Court; 6. M. Bueno; 7. J. Tegart; 8. A. Van Zyl duPlooy; 9. R. Casals; 10. L. Turner Bowrey	1. B. J. King; 2. N. Richey; 3. M. Smith Court; 4. V. Wade; 5. A. Haydon Jones; 6. J. Tegart; 7. M. Bueno; 8. A. Van Zyl duPlooy; 9. L. Turner Bowrey; 10. R. Casals	1. B. J. King; 2. V. Wade; 3. N. Richey; 4. M. Smith Court; 5. M. Bueno; 6. A. Haydon Jones; 7. J. Tegart; 8. L. Turner Bowrey; 9. A. Van Zyl duPlooy; 10. R. Casals	1. B. J. King; 2. M. Smith Court; 3. N. Richey; 4. V. Wade; 5. J. Tegart; 6. L. Turner Bowrey; 7. A. Van Zyl duPlooy; 8. A. Haydon Jones; 9. M. Bueno; 10. F. Dürr	1. B. J. King; 2. M. Smith Court; 3. A. Haydon Jones; 4. V. Wade; 5. J. Tegart; 6. M. Bueno; 7. N. Richey; 8. A. Van Zyl duPlooy; 9. L. Turner Bowrey; 10. = R. Casals = F. Dürr

=== 1969 ===
Lance Tingay	Bud Collins	Rino Tommasi; Joseph McCauley	Frank Rostron (Daily Express)
1. M. Smith Court; 2. A. Haydon Jones; 3. B. J. King; 4. N. Richey; 5. J. Heldman; 6. R. Casals; 7. K. Melville; 8. P. Bartkowicz; 9. V. Wade; 10. L. Turner Bowrey	1. M. Smith Court; 2. A. Haydon Jones; 3. B. J. King; 4. N. Richey; 5. J. Heldman; 6. R. Casals; 7. K. Melville; 8. M.-A. Eisel; 9. V. Wade; 10. L. Turner Bowrey	1. M. Smith Court; 2. A. Haydon Jones; 3. B. J. King; 4. N. Richey; 5. J. Heldman; 6. R. Casals; 7. K. Melville; 8. V. Wade; 9. J. Tegart; 10. P. Bartkowicz	1. M. Smith Court; 2. A. Haydon Jones; 3. B. J. King; 4. J. Heldman; 5. N. Richey; 6. = K. Melville = R. Casals; 8. P. Bartkowicz; 9. = L. Turner Bowrey = V. Wade

=== 1970 ===
Lance Tingay	Joseph McCauley	Bud Collins	Rino Tommasi	Rex Bellamy	Judith Elian (L'Equipe)	Mike Gibson	Tennis magazine (Germany)
1. M. Smith Court; 2. B. J. King; 3. R. Casals; 4. H. Niessen Masthoff; 5. V. Wade; 6. A. Haydon Jones; 7. K. Melville; 8. K. Krantzcke; 9. J. Heldman; 10. F. Dürr	1. M. Smith Court; 2. B. J. King; 3. R. Casals; 4. V. Wade; 5. H. Niessen Masthoff; 6. K. Melville; 7. J. Heldman; 8. K. Krantzcke; 9. F. Dürr; 10. N. Richey	1. M. Smith Court; 2. B. J. King; 3. R. Casals; 4. N. Richey; 5. V. Wade; 6. H. Niessen Masthoff; 7. A. Haydon Jones; 8. K. Melville; 9. K. Krantzcke; 10. F. Dürr	1. M. Smith Court; 2. B. J. King; 3. R. Casals; 4. V. Wade; 5. H. Niessen Masthoff; 6. K. Melville; 7. A. Haydon Jones; 8. F. Dürr; 9. K. Krantzcke; 10. E. Goolagong	1. M. Smith Court; 2. B. J. King; 3. R. Casals; 4. H. Niessen Masthoff; 5. V. Wade; 6. A. Haydon Jones; 7. K. Melville; 8. F. Dürr; 9. J. Heldman; 10. E. Goolagong	1. M. Smith Court; 2. B. J. King; 3. R. Casals; 4. H. Niessen Masthoff; 5. V. Wade; 6. K. Melville; 7. K. Krantzcke; 8. F. Dürr; 9. J. Heldman; 10. N. Richey	1. M. Smith Court; 2. B. J. King; 3. A. Haydon Jones; 4. R. Casals; 5. H. Niessen Masthoff; 6. V. Wade; 7. K. Melville; 8. K. Krantzcke; 9. J. Heldman; 10. F. Dürr	1. M. Smith Court; 2. B. J. King; 3. R. Casals; 4. H. Niessen Masthoff; 5. = K. Krantzcke = K. Melville; 7. V. Wade; 8. J. Heldman; 9. F. Dürr; 10. = W. Shaw = H. Hoesl = E. Goolagong

=== 1971 ===
Lance Tingay	Joseph McCauley	Bud Collins	Rino Tommasi	L'Èquipe	Rex Bellamy (The Times)	Frank Rostron	Björn Hellberg (Tennis Tidning)
1. E. Goolagong; 2. M. Smith Court; 3. B. J. King; 4. R. Casals; 5. K. Melville; 6. J. Tegart; 7. F. Dürr; 8. V. Wade; 9. H. Niessen Masthoff; 10. C. Evert	1. E. Goolagong; 2. B. J. King; 3. M. Smith Court; 4. R. Casals; 5. V. Wade; 6. F. Dürr; 7. H. Niessen Masthoff; 8. K. Melville; 9. N. Richey Gunter; 10. J. Tegart	1. B. J. King; 2. E. Goolagong; 3. M. Smith Court; 4. R. Casals; 5. K. Melville; 6. F. Dürr; 7. V. Wade; 8. H. Niessen Masthoff; 9. J. Tegart; 10. C. Evert	1. E. Goolagong; 2. M. Smith Court; 3. B. J. King; 4. R. Casals; 5. V. Wade; 6. F. Dürr; 7. C. Evert; 8. K. Melville; 9. H. Gourlay; 10. J. Tegart	1. E. Goolagong; 2. M. Smith Court; 3. B. J. King; 4. R. Casals; 5. K. Melville; 6. V. Wade; 7. C. Evert; 8. J. Tegart; 9. N. Richey Gunter; 10. = H. Gourlay = G. Chanfreau	1. E. Goolagong; 2. M. Smith Court; 3. B. J. King; 4. R. Casals; 5. F. Dürr; 6. H. Niessen Masthoff; 7. V. Wade; 8. N. Richey Gunter; 9. K. Melville; 10. A. Haydon Jones	1. = E. Goolagong = B. J. King; 3. M. Smith Court; 4. R. Casals; 5. K. Melville; 6. F. Dürr; 7. J. Tegart; 8. C. Evert; 9. V. Wade; 10. H. Niessen Masthoff	1. E. Goolagong; 2. B. J. King; 3. M. Smith Court; 4. R. Casals; 5. F. Dürr; 6. V. Wade; 7. K. Melville; 8. H. Niessen Masthoff; 9. N. Richey Gunter; 10. = C. Evert = J. Tegart

=== 1972 ===
Lance Tingay	Bud Collins	Rino Tommasi	Rex Bellamy	Frank Rostron	John Barrett (Financial Times)	Neil Amdur (World Tennis)
1. B. J. King; 2. E. Goolagong; 3. C. Evert; 4. M. Smith Court; 5. K. Melville; 6. V. Wade; 7. R. Casals; 8. N. Richey Gunter; 9. F. Dürr; 10. L. Tuero	1. B. J. King; 2. M. Smith Court; 3. N. Richey Gunter; 4. C. Evert; 5. V. Wade; 6. E. Goolagong; 7. R. Casals; 8. K. Melville; 9. F. Dürr; 10. O. Morozova	1. B. J. King; 2. E. Goolagong; 3. C. Evert; 4. M. Smith Court; 5. N. Richey Gunter; 6. R. Casals; 7. K. Melville; 8. V. Wade; 9. F. Dürr; 10. H. Niessen Masthoff	1. B. J. King; 2. E. Goolagong; 3. C. Evert; 4. N. Richey Gunter; 5. M. Smith Court; 6. V. Wade; 7. R. Casals; 8. K. Melville; 9. F. Dürr; 10. H. Niessen Masthoff	1. B. J. King; 2. E. Goolagong; 3. C. Evert; 4. M. Smith Court; 5. = V. Wade = K. Melville; 7. = R. Casals = N. Richey Gunter; 9. F. Dürr; 10. = H. Niessen Masthoff = L. Tuero	1. B. J. King; 2. M. Smith Court; 3. C. Evert; 4. E. Goolagong; 5. N. Richey Gunter; 6. K. Melville; 7. R. Casals; 8. V. Wade; 9. F. Dürr; 10. B. Stöve	1. B. J. King; 2. N. Richey Gunter; 3. C. Evert; 4. E. Goolagong; 5. M. Smith Court; 6. K. Melville; 7. R. Casals; 8. V. Wade; 9. F. Dürr; 10. = W. Overton = O. Morozova

=== 1973 ===
Lance Tingay	Bud Collins	Rino Tommasi	Rex Bellamy (Note: He gave a different ranking in World Tennis in December 1973.)	John Barrett	Neil Amdur	Poll of 17 international sportswriters
1. M. Smith Court; 2. B. J. King; 3. C. Evert; 4. E. Goolagong; 5. K. Melville; 6. V. Wade; 7. R. Casals; 8. H. Niessen Masthoff; 9. O. Morozova; 10. B. Stöve	1. M. Smith Court; 2. B. J. King; 3. E. Goolagong; 4. C. Evert; 5. R. Casals; 6. V. Wade; 7. K. Melville; 8. N. Richey Gunter; 9. J. Heldman; 10. H. Niessen Masthoff	1. M. Smith Court; 2. C. Evert; 3. B. J. King; 4. E. Goolagong; 5. K. Melville; 6. R. Casals; 7. N. Richey Gunter; 8. V. Wade; 9. H. Niessen Masthoff; 10. O. Morozova	1. M. Smith Court; 2. C. Evert; 3. B. J. King; 4. E. Goolagong; 5. R. Casals; 6. V. Wade; 7. K. Melville; 8. N. Richey Gunter; 9. O. Morozova; 10. H. Niessen Masthoff	1. M. Smith Court; 2. C. Evert; 3. = E. Goolagong Cawley = B. J. King; 5. K. Melville; 6. H. Niessen Masthoff; 7. R. Casals; 8. V. Wade; 9. O. Morozova; 10. N. Richey Gunter	1. M. Smith Court; 2. C. Evert; 3. B. J. King; 4. E. Goolagong; 5. K. Melville; 6. V. Wade; 7. R. Casals; 8. O. Morozova; 9. N. Richey Gunter; 10. F. Dürr	1. M. Smith Court; 2. C. Evert; 3. B. J. King; 4. E. Goolagong; 5. V. Wade; 6. K. Melville; 7. R. Casals; 8. H. Niessen Masthoff; 9. N. Richey Gunter; 10. O. Morozova

=== 1974 ===
Lance Tingay	Bud Collins	Rino Tommasi	John Barrett	World Tennis	Judith Elian	Rex Bellamy	Tennis magazine (U.S.)
1. C. Evert; 2. B. J. King; 3. E. Goolagong; 4. O. Morozova; 5. K. Melville; 6. R. Casals; 7. V. Wade; 8. H. Niessen Masthoff; 9. J. Heldman; 10. N. Richey Gunter	1. B. J. King; 2. E. Goolagong; 3. C. Evert; 4. V. Wade; 5. J. Heldman; 6. R. Casals; 7. K. Melville; 8. O. Morozova; 9. L. Hunt; 10. F. Dürr	1. C. Evert; 2. B. J. King; 3. E. Goolagong; 4. V. Wade; 5. K. Melville; 6. O. Morozova; 7. R. Casals; 8. H. Niessen Masthoff; 9. N. Richey Gunter; 10. J. Heldman	1. C. Evert; 2. B. J. King; 3. E. Goolagong; 4. O. Morozova; 5. V. Wade; 6. K. Melville; 7. M. Navratilova; 8. J. Heldman; 9. H. Niessen Masthoff; 10. R. Casals	1. C. Evert; 2. B. J. King; 3. E. Goolagong; 4. O. Morozova; 5. K. Melville; 6. R. Casals; 7. V. Wade; 8. J. Heldman; 9. N. Richey Gunter; 10. = M. Navratilova = F. Dürr	1. C. Evert; 2. O. Morozova; 3. B. J. King; 4. E. Goolagong; 5. R. Casals; 6. K. Melville; 7. V. Wade; 8. L. Hunt; 9. N. Richey Gunter; 10. J. Heldman	1. C. Evert; 2. B. J. King; 3. E. Goolagong; 4. O. Morozova; 5. V. Wade; 6. K. Melville; 7. R. Casals; 8. H. Niessen Masthoff; 9. J. Heldman; 10. M. Navratilova	1. C. Evert; 2. B. J. King; 3. E. Goolagong; 4. O. Morozova; 5. V. Wade; 6. K. Melville; 7. R. Casals; 8. J. Heldman; 9. N. Richey Gunter; 10. M. Navratilova

== See also ==
- World number 1 ranked female tennis players
- List of WTA number 1 ranked singles tennis players
- Top ten ranked male tennis players
- Top ten ranked male tennis players (1912–1972)
