= Top ten ranked female tennis players =

This article presents year-ending top ten lists of female singles tennis players, as ranked by various official and non-official ranking authorities throughout the history of the sport.

The article is split into two sections: 1921–1974, and since 1975 when the first official WTA rankings were published, for ease of navigation.

== Top ten rankings by year ==
=== 1975 ===
The official WTA rankings were introduced in November 1975.

WTA	Lance Tingay (The Daily Telegraph)	Bud Collins (The Boston Globe)	Rino Tommasi (La Gazzetta dello Sport)	John Barrett (Financial Times)	World Tennis	Tennis magazine (U.S.)	Rex Bellamy (The Times)	Chris Evert
1. C. Evert; 2. V. Wade; 3. M. Navratilova; 4. B. J. King; 5. E. Goolagong Cawley; 6. M. Smith Court; 7. O. Morozova; 8. N. Richey Gunter; 9. F. Dürr; 10. K. Melville Reid	1. C. Evert; 2. B. J. King; 3. E. Goolagong Cawley; 4. M. Navratilova; 5. V. Wade; 6. M. Smith Court; 7. O. Morozova; 8. K. Sawamatsu; 9. J. Heldman; 10. K. Melville Reid	1. C. Evert; 2. B. J. King; 3. E. Goolagong Cawley; 4. M. Navratilova; 5. V. Wade; 6. M. Smith Court; 7. O. Morozova; 8. N. Richey Gunter; 9. F. Dürr; 10. R. Casals	1. C. Evert; 2. B. J. King; 3. V. Wade; 4. M. Navratilova; 5. M. Smith Court; 6. E. Goolagong Cawley; 7. O. Morozova; 8. N. Richey Gunter; 9. K. Sawamatsu; 10. J. Heldman	1. C. Evert; 2. B. J. King; 3. E. Goolagong Cawley; 4. M. Navratilova; 5. V. Wade; 6. M. Smith Court; 7. O. Morozova; 8. K. Melville Reid; 9. B. Stöve; 10. K. Sawamatsu	1. C. Evert; 2. B. J. King; 3. M. Navratilova; 4. E. Goolagong Cawley; 5. V. Wade; 6. M. Smith Court; 7. O. Morozova; 8. N. Richey Gunter; 9. F. Dürr; 10. R. Casals	1. C. Evert; 2. B. J. King; 3. E. Goolagong Cawley; 4. M. Navratilova; 5. V. Wade; 6. M. Smith Court; 7. O. Morozova; 8. K. Melville Reid; 9. B. Stöve; 10. K. Sawamatsu	1. C. Evert; 2. M. Navratilova; 3. E. Goolagong Cawley; 4. V. Wade; 5. B. J. King; 6. M. Smith Court; 7. O. Morozova; 8. K. Sawamatsu; 9. M. Jaušovec; 10. D. Fromholtz	1. C. Evert; 2. B. J. King; 3. E. Goolagong Cawley; 4. M. Navratilova; 5. V. Wade; 6. M. Smith Court; 7. O. Morozova; 8. N. Richey Gunter; 9. F. Dürr; 10. B. Stöve

=== 1976 ===
WTA	Lance Tingay	Bud Collins	Rino Tommasi	John Barrett	World Tennis
1. C. Evert; 2. E. Goolagong Cawley; 3. V. Wade; 4. M. Navratilova; 5. D. Fromholtz; 6. R. Casals; 7. B. Stöve; 8. K. Melville Reid; 9. O. Morozova; 10. S. Barker	1. C. Evert; 2. E. Goolagong Cawley; 3. V. Wade; 4. R. Casals; 5. M. Navratilova; 6. D. Fromholtz; 7. K. Melville Reid; 8. S. Barker; 9. M. Jaušovec; 10. O. Morozova	1. C. Evert; 2. E. Goolagong Cawley; 3. V. Wade; 4. M. Navratilova; 5. S. Barker; 6. B. Stöve; 7. D. Fromholtz; 8. M. Jaušovec; 9. R. Casals; 10. F. Dürr	1. C. Evert; 2. E. Goolagong Cawley; 3. V. Wade; 4. K. Melville Reid; 5. M. Navratilova; 6. O. Morozova; 7. S. Barker; 8. D. Fromholtz; 9. R. Casals; 10. M. Jaušovec	1. C. Evert; 2. E. Goolagong Cawley; 3. V. Wade; 4. S. Barker; 5. R. Casals; 6. M. Navratilova; 7. M. Jaušovec; 8. F. Dürr; 9. D. Fromholtz; 10. R. Tomanová	1. C. Evert; 2. E. Goolagong Cawley; 3. V. Wade; 4. R. Casals; 5. M. Navratilova; 6. S. Barker; 7. M. Jaušovec; 8. D. Fromholtz; 9. B. Stöve; 10. T. Holladay

=== 1977 ===
WTA	Lance Tingay	Bud Collins	Rino Tommasi	John Barrett	World Tennis	Tennis magazine (U.S.)	Peter Bodo (Tennis magazine (U.S.))	Judith Elian (L'Équipe)	Wataru Tsukagoshi (Tennis Japan)	Barry Lorge (The Washington Post)	France-Presse
1. C. Evert; 2. B. J. King; 3. M. Navratilova; 4. V. Wade; 5. S. Barker; 6. R. Casals; 7. B. Stöve; 8. D. Fromholtz; 9. W. Turnbull; 10. K. Melville Reid	1. C. Evert; 2. V. Wade; 3. B. J. King; 4. M. Navratilova; 5. S. Barker; 6. K. Melville Reid; 7. W. Turnbull; 8. R. Casals; 9. B. Stöve; 10. M. Jaušovec	1. C. Evert; 2. B. J. King; 3. V. Wade; 4. M. Navratilova; 5. S. Barker; 6. W. Turnbull; 7. B. Stöve; 8. R. Casals; 9. D. Fromholtz; 10. K. Melville Reid	1. C. Evert; 2. B. J. King; 3. M. Navratilova; 4. S. Barker; 5. V. Wade; 6. R. Casals; 7. T. Austin; 8. K. Melville Reid; 9. W. Turnbull; 10. B. Stöve	1. C. Evert; 2. V. Wade; 3. B. J. King; 4. B. Stöve; 5. M. Navratilova; 6. S. Barker; 7. W. Turnbull; 8. R. Casals; 9. M. Jaušovec; 10. K. Melville Reid	1. C. Evert; 2. V. Wade; 3. M. Navratilova; 4. S. Barker; 5. B. J. King; 6. B. Stöve; 7. W. Turnbull; 8. R. Casals; 9. K. Melville Reid; 10. D. Fromholtz	1. C. Evert; 2. V. Wade; 3. M. Navratilova; 4. S. Barker; 5. B. Stöve; 6. B. J. King; 7. W. Turnbull; 8. R. Casals; 9. K. Melville Reid; 10. M. Jaušovec	1. C. Evert; 2. V. Wade; 3. M. Navratilova; 4. B. J. King; 5. S. Barker; 6. B. Stöve; 7. W. Turnbull; 8. D. Fromholtz; 9. R. Casals; 10. K. Melville Reid	1. C. Evert; 2. V. Wade; 3. B. J. King; 4. M. Navratilova; 5. B. Stöve; 6. S. Barker; 7. W. Turnbull; 8. K. Melville Reid; 9. R. Casals; 10. M. Jaušovec	1. C. Evert; 2. V. Wade; 3. B. Stöve; 4. M. Navratilova; 5. S. Barker; 6. W. Turnbull; 7. B. J. King; 8. M. Jaušovec; 9. K. Melville Reid; 10. D. Fromholtz	1. C. Evert; 2. V. Wade; 3. B. J. King; 4. M. Navratilova; 5. B. Stöve; 6. S. Barker; 7. W. Turnbull; 8. R. Casals; 9. D. Fromholtz; 10. = M. Jaušovec = K. Melville Reid	1. C. Evert; 2. V. Wade; 3. B. J. King; 4. M. Navratilova; 5. B. Stöve; 6. S. Barker; 7. K. Melville Reid; 8. W. Turnbull; 9. M. Jaušovec; 10. R. Casals

=== 1978 ===
WTA	Lance Tingay	Bud Collins	Rino Tommasi	John Barrett	World Tennis	Tennis magazine (U.S.)
1. M. Navratilova; 2. C. Evert; 3. E. Goolagong Cawley; 4. V. Wade; 5. B. J. King; 6. T. Austin; 7. W. Turnbull; 8. B. Stöve; 9. K. Melville Reid; 10. D. Fromholtz	1. M. Navratilova; 2. C. Evert; 3. E. Goolagong Cawley; 4. V. Wade; 5. B. J. King; 6. W. Turnbull; 7. V. Ruzici; 8. M. Jaušovec; 9. R. Maršíková; 10. P. Shriver	1. M. Navratilova; 2. C. Evert; 3. E. Goolagong Cawley; 4. V. Wade; 5. B. J. King; 6. T. Austin; 7. P. Shriver; 8. V. Ruzici; 9. W. Turnbull; 10. K. Melville Reid	1. C. Evert; 2. M. Navratilova; 3. E. Goolagong Cawley; 4. B. J. King; 5. V. Wade; 6. T. Austin; 7. W. Turnbull; 8. V. Ruzici; 9. B. Stöve; 10. K. Melville Reid	1. C. Evert; 2. M. Navratilova; 3. E. Goolagong Cawley; 4. V. Wade; 5. W. Turnbull; 6. V. Ruzici; 7. B. J. King; 8. = T. Austin = P. Shriver; 10. M. Jaušovec	1. C. Evert; 2. M. Navratilova; 3. E. Goolagong Cawley; 4. V. Wade; 5. B. J. King; 6. B. Stöve; 7. W. Turnbull; 8. T. Austin; 9. V. Ruzici; 10. P. Shriver	1. C. Evert; 2. M. Navratilova; 3. E. Goolagong Cawley; 4. V. Wade; 5. W. Turnbull; 6. V. Ruzici; 7. K. Melville Reid; 8. T. Austin; 9. B. J. King; 10. B. Stöve

=== 1979 ===
WTA	Lance Tingay	Bud Collins	Rino Tommasi	John Barrett	World Tennis	Tennis magazine (U.S.)	Peter Bodo	Judith Elian	Wataru Tsukagoshi	Joseph Macauley (Australian Tennis Magazine)	Alan Trengrove (Australian Tennis Magazine)	Jeffrey Bairstow (Tennis magazine (U.S.))
1. M. Navratilova; 2. C. Evert-Lloyd; 3. T. Austin; 4. E. Goolagong Cawley; 5. B. J. King; 6. D. Fromholtz; 7. W. Turnbull; 8. V. Wade; 9. K. Melville Reid; 10. S. Barker	1. M. Navratilova; 2. T. Austin; 3. C. Evert-Lloyd; 4. B. J. King; 5. E. Goolagong Cawley; 6. V. Wade; 7. D. Fromholtz; 8. W. Turnbull; 9. V. Ruzici; 10. S. Hanika	1. M. Navratilova; 2. T. Austin; 3. C. Evert-Lloyd; 4. E. Goolagong Cawley; 5. B. J. King; 6. W. Turnbull; 7. D. Fromholtz; 8. K. Melville Reid; 9. V. Wade; 10. R. Maršíková	1. M. Navratilova; 2. C. Evert; 3. T. Austin; 4. E. Goolagong Cawley; 5. B. J. King; 6. D. Fromholtz; 7. W. Turnbull; 8. K. Jordan; 9. V. Wade; 10. K. Melville Reid	1. M. Navratilova; 2. T. Austin; 3. C. Evert-Lloyd; 4. E. Goolagong Cawley; 5. B. J. King; 6. D. Fromholtz; 7. V. Wade; 8. W. Turnbull; 9. K. Melville Reid; 10. V. Ruzici	1. M. Navratilova; 2. T. Austin; 3. C. Evert-Lloyd; 4. E. Goolagong Cawley; 5. W. Turnbull; 6. D. Fromholtz; 7. B. J. King; 8. V. Wade; 9. S. Barker; 10. V. Ruzici	1. M. Navratilova; 2. C. Evert-Lloyd; 3. T. Austin; 4. E. Goolagong Cawley; 5. B. J. King; 6. D. Fromholtz; 7. W. Turnbull; 8. V. Wade; 9. K. Melville Reid; 10. K. Jordan	1. M. Navratilova; 2. T. Austin; 3. C. Evert-Lloyd; 4. E. Goolagong Cawley; 5. W. Turnbull; 6. D. Fromholtz; 7. B. J. King; 8. V. Wade; 9. K. Melville Reid; 10. K. Jordan	1. C. Evert-Lloyd; 2. M. Navratilova; 3. T. Austin; 4. E. Goolagong Cawley; 5. V. Wade; 6. B. J. King; 7. K. Melville Reid; 8. W. Turnbull; 9. D. Fromholtz; 10. R. Maršíková	1. M. Navratilova; 2. T. Austin; 3. C. Evert-Lloyd; 4. B. J. King; 5. E. Goolagong Cawley; 6. D. Fromholtz; 7. V. Wade; 8. W. Turnbull; 9. K. Jordan; 10. K. Melville Reid	1. M. Navratilova; 2. T. Austin; 3. C. Evert-Lloyd; 4. E. Goolagong Cawley; 5. B. J. King; 6. D. Fromholtz; 7. W. Turnbull; 8. V. Wade; 9. K. Melville Reid; 10. S. Barker	1. M. Navratilova; 2. C. Evert-Lloyd; 3. T. Austin; 4. E. Goolagong Cawley; 5. B. J. King; 6. D. Fromholtz; 7. W. Turnbull; 8. V. Wade; 9. K. Melville Reid; 10. G. Stevens	1. M. Navratilova; 2. T. Austin; 3. C. Evert-Lloyd; 4. E. Goolagong Cawley; 5. B. J. King; 6. W. Turnbull; 7. D. Fromholtz; 8. K. Melville Reid; 9. V. Wade; 10. K. Jordan

=== 1980 ===
WTA	Lance Tingay	Bud Collins	Rino Tommasi	John Barrett	World Tennis	Tennis magazine (U.S.)
1. C. Evert-Lloyd; 2. T. Austin; 3. M. Navratilova; 4. H. Mandlíková; 5. E. Goolagong Cawley; 6. B. J. King; 7. A. Jaeger; 8. W. Turnbull; 9. P. Shriver; 10. G. Stevens	1. C. Evert-Lloyd; 2. E. Goolagong Cawley; 3. T. Austin; 4. M. Navratilova; 5. H. Mandlíková; 6. B. J. King; 7. V. Ruzici; 8. A. Jaeger; 9. W. Turnbull; 10. K. Jordan	1. C. Evert-Lloyd; 2. T. Austin; 3. M. Navratilova; 4. H. Mandlíková; 5. A. Jaeger; 6. E. Goolagong Cawley; 7. B. J. King; 8. W. Turnbull; 9. P. Shriver; 10. V. Ruzici	1. C. Evert-Lloyd; 2. T. Austin; 3. M. Navratilova; 4. H. Mandlíková; 5. A. Jaeger; 6. B. J. King; 7. E. Goolagong Cawley; 8. W. Turnbull; 9. P. Shriver; 10. G. Stevens	1. C. Evert-Lloyd; 2. T. Austin; 3. M. Navratilova; 4. E. Goolagong Cawley; 5. H. Mandlíková; 6. A. Jaeger; 7. W. Turnbull; 8. V. Ruzici; 9. D. Fromholtz; 10. P. Shriver	1. C. Evert-Lloyd; 2. T. Austin; 3. M. Navratilova; 4. E. Goolagong Cawley; 5. H. Mandlíková; 6. A. Jaeger; 7. B. J. King; 8. W. Turnbull; 9. V. Ruzici; 10. P. Shriver	1. C. Evert-Lloyd; 2. T. Austin; 3. E. Goolagong Cawley; 4. M. Navratilova; 5. H. Mandlíková; 6. A. Jaeger; 7. B. J. King; 8. W. Turnbull; 9. V. Ruzici; 10. K. Jordan

=== 1981 ===
WTA	Lance Tingay	Bud Collins	Rino Tommasi	John Barrett	World Tennis	Tennis magazine (U.S.)	Peter Bodo	Judith Elian	Wataru Tsukagoshi	Alan Trengrove	Alexander McNab (Tennis magazine (U.S.))
1. C. Evert-Lloyd; 2. T. Austin; 3. M. Navratilova; 4. A. Jaeger; 5. H. Mandlíková; 6. S. Hanika; 7. P. Shriver; 8. W. Turnbull; 9. B. Bunge; 10. B. Potter	1. T. Austin; 2. C. Evert-Lloyd; 3. H. Mandlíková; 4. M. Navratilova; 5. A. Jaeger; 6. V. Ruzici; 7. W. Turnbull; 8. P. Shriver; 9. S. Hanika; 10. M. Jaušovec	1. T. Austin; 2. M. Navratilova; 3. C. Evert-Lloyd; 4. H. Mandlíková; 5. P. Shriver; 6. A. Jaeger; 7. S. Hanika; 8. M. Jaušovec; 9. B. Potter; 10. V. Ruzici	1. C. Evert-Lloyd; 2. T. Austin; 3. M. Navratilova; 4. A. Jaeger; 5. H. Mandlíková; 6. S. Hanika; 7. P. Shriver; 8. W. Turnbull; 9. B. Potter; 10. B. Bunge	1. = T. Austin = C. Evert-Lloyd; 3. H. Mandlíková; 4. M. Navratilova; 5. A. Jaeger; 6. W. Turnbull; 7. P. Shriver; 8. V. Ruzici; 9. S. Hanika; 10. M. Jaušovec	1. C. Evert-Lloyd; 2. T. Austin; 3. M. Navratilova; 4. H. Mandlíková; 5. A. Jaeger; 6. P. Shriver; 7. S. Hanika; 8. M. Jaušovec; 9. V. Ruzici; 10. B. Potter	1. C. Evert-Lloyd; 2. T. Austin; 3. M. Navratilova; 4. H. Mandlíková; 5. A. Jaeger; 6. P. Shriver; 7. S. Hanika; 8. V. Ruzici; 9. W. Turnbull; 10. M. Jaušovec	1. C. Evert-Lloyd; 2. M. Navratilova; 3. T. Austin; 4. H. Mandlíková; 5. A. Jaeger; 6. P. Shriver; 7. S. Hanika; 8. V. Ruzici; 9. W. Turnbull; 10. M. Jaušovec	1. C. Evert-Lloyd; 2. H. Mandlíková; 3. T. Austin; 4. M. Navratilova; 5. A. Jaeger; 6. P. Shriver; 7. S. Hanika; 8. M. Jaušovec; 9. V. Ruzici; 10. = B. Bunge = R. Maršíková	1. C. Evert-Lloyd; 2. T. Austin; 3. M. Navratilova; 4. A. Jaeger; 5. H. Mandlíková; 6. P. Shriver; 7. S. Hanika; 8. B. Potter; 9. M. Jaušovec; 10. = B. Bunge = R. Maršíková	1. C. Evert-Lloyd; 2. M. Navratilova; 3. T. Austin; 4. H. Mandlíková; 5. A. Jaeger; 6. P. Shriver; 7. S. Hanika; 8. W. Turnbull; 9. V. Ruzici; 10. S. Barker	1. C. Evert-Lloyd; 2. M. Navratilova; 3. T. Austin; 4. H. Mandlíková; 5. A. Jaeger; 6. P. Shriver; 7. S. Hanika; 8. V. Ruzici; 9. W. Turnbull; 10. 8. M. Jaušovec

=== 1982 ===
WTA	Lance Tingay	Bud Collins	Rino Tommasi	John Barrett	World Tennis
1. M. Navratilova; 2. C. Evert-Lloyd; 3. A. Jaeger; 4. T. Austin; 5. W. Turnbull; 6. P. Shriver; 7. H. Mandlíková; 8. B. Potter; 9. B. Bunge; 10. S. Hanika	1. M. Navratilova; 2. C. Evert-Lloyd; 3. A. Jaeger; 4. H. Mandlíková; 5. B. Potter; 6. T. Austin; 7. P. Shriver; 8. B. Bunge; 9. B. J. King; 10. S. Hanika	1. M. Navratilova; 2. C. Evert-Lloyd; 3. A. Jaeger; 4. B. Potter; 5. H. Mandlíková; 6. T. Austin; 7. W. Turnbull; 8. S. Hanika; 9. P. Shriver; 10. B. Bunge	1. M. Navratilova; 2. C. Evert-Lloyd; 3. A. Jaeger; 4. T. Austin; 5. W. Turnbull; 6. B. Potter; 7. B. Bunge; 8. H. Mandlíková; 9. P. Shriver; 10. S. Hanika	1. M. Navratilova; 2. C. Evert-Lloyd; 3. A. Jaeger; 4. H. Mandlíková; 5. T. Austin; 6. V. Ruzici; 7. B. Bunge; 8. P. Shriver; 9. B. Potter; 10. = Z. Garrison = W. Turnbull	1. M. Navratilova; 2. C. Evert-Lloyd; 3. A. Jaeger; 4. H. Mandlíková; 5. P. Shriver; 6. W. Turnbull; 7. B. Potter; 8. B. Bunge; 9. T. Austin; 10. S. Hanika

=== 1983 ===
WTA	Lance Tingay	Bud Collins	Rino Tommasi	John Barrett	World Tennis	Tennis magazine (U.S.)
1. M. Navratilova; 2. C. Evert-Lloyd; 3. A. Jaeger; 4. T. Austin; 5. P. Shriver; 6. S. Hanika; 7. W. Turnbull; 8. J. Durie; 9. H. Mandlíková; 10. A. Temesvári	1. M. Navratilova; 2. C. Evert-Lloyd; 3. A. Jaeger; 4. H. Mandlíková; 5. S. Hanika; 6. P. Shriver; 7. M. Jaušovec; 8. A. Temesvári; 9. B. J. King; 10. J. Durie	1. M. Navratilova; 2. C. Evert-Lloyd; 3. P. Shriver; 4. A. Jaeger; 5. J. Durie; 6. W. Turnbull; 7. H. Mandlíková; 8. A. Temesvári; 9. S. Hanika; 10. K. Jordan	1. M. Navratilova; 2. C. Evert-Lloyd; 3. P. Shriver; 4. B. J. King; 5. A. Jaeger; 6. T. Austin; 7. S. Hanika; 8. H. Mandlíková; 9. A. Temesvári; 10. B. Bunge	1. M. Navratilova; 2. C. Evert-Lloyd; 3. A. Jaeger; 4. J. Durie; 5. P. Shriver; 6. H. Mandlíková; 7. W. Turnbull; 8. S. Hanika; 9. A. Temesvári; 10. B. Potter	1. M. Navratilova; 2. C. Evert-Lloyd; 3. A. Jaeger; 4. P. Shriver; 5. J. Durie; 6. A. Temesvári; 7. S. Hanika; 8. W. Turnbull; 9. K. Jordan; 10. H. Mandlíková	1. M. Navratilova; 2. C. Evert-Lloyd; 3. A. Jaeger; 4. P. Shriver; 5. H. Mandlíková; 6. S. Hanika; 7. W. Turnbull; 8. A. Temesvári; 9. K. Jordan

=== 1984 ===
WTA	Lance Tingay	Bud Collins	Rino Tommasi	John Barrett	World Tennis (panel ranking)	Tennis magazine (U.S.)
1. M. Navratilova; 2. C. Evert-Lloyd; 3. H. Mandlíková; 4. P. Shriver; 5. W. Turnbull; 6. Man Maleeva; 7. H. Suková; 8. C. Kohde-Kilsch; 9. Z. Garrison; 10. K. Jordan	1. M. Navratilova; 2. C. Evert-Lloyd; 3. H. Mandlíková; 4. Man Maleeva; 5. K. Jordan; 6. P. Shriver; 7. W. Turnbull; 8. C. Kohde-Kilsch; 9. C. Bassett; 10. H. Suková	1. M. Navratilova; 2. C. Evert-Lloyd; 3. H. Mandlíková; 4. H. Suková; 5. Man Maleeva; 6. P. Shriver; 7. C. Kohde-Kilsch; 8. Z. Garrison; 9. W. Turnbull; 10. C. Bassett	1. M. Navratilova; 2. C. Evert-Lloyd; 3. H. Mandlíková; 4. P. Shriver; 5. Man Maleeva; 6. K. Jordan; 7. Z. Garrison; 8. H. Suková; 9. B. Gadusek; 10. C. Kohde-Kilsch	1. M. Navratilova; 2. C. Evert-Lloyd; 3. H. Mandlíková; 4. P. Shriver; 5. C. Bassett; 6. Man Maleeva; 7. Z. Garrison; 8. K. Jordan; 9. W. Turnbull; 10. C. Kohde-Kilsch	1. M. Navratilova; 2. C. Evert-Lloyd; 3. H. Mandlíková; 4. P. Shriver; 5. Man Maleeva; 6. H. Suková; 7. C. Kohde-Kilsch; 8. K. Jordan; 9. C. Bassett; 10. Z. Garrison	1. M. Navratilova; 2. C. Evert-Lloyd; 3. H. Mandlíková; 4. P. Shriver; 5. Man Maleeva; 6. H. Suková; 7. K. Jordan; 8. W. Turnbull; 9. C. Bassett; 10. Z. Garrison

=== 1985 ===
WTA	Lance Tingay	Bud Collins	Rino Tommasi	John Barrett	World Tennis (panel ranking)
1. M. Navratilova; 2. C. Evert-Lloyd; 3. H. Mandlíková; 4. P. Shriver; 5. C. Kohde-Kilsch; 6. S. Graf; 7. Man Maleeva; 8. Z. Garrison; 9. H. Suková; 10. B. Gadusek	1. M. Navratilova; 2. H. Mandlíková; 3. C. Evert-Lloyd; 4. P. Shriver; 5. Z. Garrison; 6. H. Suková; 7. K. Rinaldi; 8. C. Kohde-Kilsch; 9. Man Maleeva; 10. S. Graf	1. M. Navratilova; 2. C. Evert-Lloyd; 3. H. Mandlíková; 4. C. Kohde-Kilsch; 5. P. Shriver; 6. Z. Garrison; 7. H. Suková; 8. S. Graf; 9. K. Rinaldi; 10. G. Sabatini	1. M. Navratilova; 2. C. Evert-Lloyd; 3. H. Mandlíková; 4. S. Graf; 5. C. Kohde-Kilsch; 6. P. Shriver; 7. K. Rinaldi; 8. Z. Garrison; 9. B. Gadusek; 10. G. Sabatini	1. M. Navratilova; 2. C. Evert-Lloyd; 3. H. Mandlíková; 4. Z. Garrison; 5. C. Kohde-Kilsch; 6. H. Suková; 7. P. Shriver; 8. S. Graf; 9. Man Maleeva; 10. = K. Rinaldi = G. Sabatini	1. M. Navratilova; 2. C. Evert-Lloyd; 3. H. Mandlíková; 4. C. Kohde-Kilsch; 5. P. Shriver; 6. Z. Garrison; 7. H. Suková; 8. K. Rinaldi; 9. S. Graf; 10. G. Sabatini

=== 1986 ===
WTA	Lance Tingay	Bud Collins	Rino Tommasi	John Barrett	World Tennis (panel ranking)
1. M. Navratilova; 2. C. Evert-Lloyd; 3. S. Graf; 4. H. Mandlíková; 5. H. Suková; 6. P. Shriver; 7. C. Kohde-Kilsch; 8. Man Maleeva; 9. K. Rinaldi; 10. G. Sabatini	1. M. Navratilova; 2. C. Evert-Lloyd; 3. H. Mandlíková; 4. S. Graf; 5. H. Suková; 6. P. Shriver; 7. C. Kohde-Kilsch; 8. Man Maleeva; 9. G. Sabatini; 10. L. McNeil	1. M. Navratilova; 2. C. Evert-Lloyd; 3. S. Graf; 4. H. Suková; 5. P. Shriver; 6. H. Mandlíková; 7. C. Kohde-Kilsch; 8. G. Sabatini; 9. L. McNeil; 10. Man Maleeva	1. M. Navratilova; 2. C. Evert-Lloyd; 3. S. Graf; 4. H. Mandlíková; 5. H. Suková; 6. P. Shriver; 7. C. Kohde-Kilsch; 8. K. Rinaldi; 9. Man Maleeva; 10. B. Bunge	1. M. Navratilova; 2. C. Evert-Lloyd; 3. S. Graf; 4. H. Suková; 5. H. Mandlíková; 6. G. Sabatini; 7. P. Shriver; 8. Z. Garrison; 9. Man Maleeva; 10. K. Rinaldi	1. M. Navratilova; 2. C. Evert-Lloyd; 3. S. Graf; 4. H. Mandlíková; 5. H. Suková; 6. P. Shriver; 7. G. Sabatini; 8. Man Maleeva; 9. C. Kohde-Kilsch; 10. L. McNeil

=== 1987 ===
WTA	Lance Tingay	Bud Collins	Rino Tommasi	John Barrett	World Tennis (panel ranking)
1. S. Graf; 2. M. Navratilova; 3. C. Evert; 4. P. Shriver; 5. H. Mandlíková; 6. G. Sabatini; 7. H. Suková; 8. Man Maleeva; 9. Z. Garrison; 10. C. Kohde-Kilsch	1. = M. Navratilova = S. Graf; 3. C. Evert; 4. H. Mandlíková; 5. P. Shriver; 6. G. Sabatini; 7. H. Suková; 8. L. McNeil; 9. Man Maleeva; 10. Z. Garrison	1. S. Graf; 2. M. Navratilova; 3. C. Evert; 4. P. Shriver; 5. H. Mandlíková; 6. G. Sabatini; 7. H. Suková; 8. Man Maleeva; 9. L. McNeil; 10. Z. Garrison	1. S. Graf; 2. M. Navratilova; 3. C. Evert; 4. P. Shriver; 5. H. Mandlíková; 6. G. Sabatini; 7. Man Maleeva; 8. H. Suková; 9. Z. Garrison; 10. C. Kohde-Kilsch	1. S. Graf; 2. M. Navratilova; 3. C. Evert; 4. H. Mandlíková; 5. G. Sabatini; 6. P. Shriver; 7. H. Suková; 8. C. Kohde-Kilsch; 9. Man Maleeva; 10. L. McNeil	1. S. Graf; 2. M. Navratilova; 3. C. Evert; 4. P. Shriver; 5. H. Mandlíková; 6. G. Sabatini; 7. H. Suková; 8. Man Maleeva; 9. L. McNeil; 10. Z. Garrison

=== 1988 ===
WTA	Lance Tingay	Bud Collins	Rino Tommasi	John Barrett	World Tennis (panel ranking)
1. S. Graf; 2. M. Navratilova; 3. C. Evert; 4. G. Sabatini; 5. P. Shriver; 6. Man Maleeva-Fragnière; 7. N. Zvereva; 8. H. Suková; 9. Z. Garrison; 10. B. Potter	1. S. Graf; 2. M. Navratilova; 3. G. Sabatini; 4. C. Evert; 5. P. Shriver; 6. H. Suková; 7. N. Zvereva; 8. C. Kohde-Kilsch; 9. Z. Garrison; 10. Man Maleeva-Fragnière	1. S. Graf; 2. M. Navratilova; 3. G. Sabatini; 4. C. Evert; 5. P. Shriver; 6. N. Zvereva; 7. Man Maleeva-Fragnière; 8. H. Suková; 9. Z. Garrison; 10. K. Maleeva	1. S. Graf; 2. M. Navratilova; 3. C. Evert; 4. G. Sabatini; 5. P. Shriver; 6. H. Suková; 7. N. Zvereva; 8. Man Maleeva-Fragnière; 9. Z. Garrison; 10. M. J. Fernández	1. S. Graf; 2. G. Sabatini; 3. M. Navratilova; 4. C. Evert; 5. P. Shriver; 6. H. Suková; 7. N. Zvereva; 8. Z. Garrison; 9. Man Maleeva-Fragnière; 10. C. Kohde-Kilsch	1. S. Graf; 2. M. Navratilova; 3. G. Sabatini; 4. C. Evert; 5. P. Shriver; 6. N. Zvereva; 7. H. Suková; 8. Man Maleeva-Fragnière; 9. Z. Garrison; 10. C. Kohde-Kilsch

=== 1989 ===
Last Tingay ranking before his death.

WTA	Lance Tingay	Bud Collins	John Barrett	World Tennis (panel ranking)
1. S. Graf; 2. M. Navratilova; 3. G. Sabatini; 4. Z. Garrison; 5. A. Sánchez Vicario; 6. M. Seles; 7. C. Martínez; 8. H. Suková; 9. Man Maleeva-Fragnière; 10. C. Evert	1. S. Graf; 2. G. Sabatini; 3. M. Navratilova; 4. A. Sánchez Vicario; 5. C. Evert; 6. H. Suková; 7. Z. Garrison; 8. Man Maleeva-Fragnière; 9. J. Novotná; 10. M. Seles	1. S. Graf; 2. M. Navratilova; 3. A. Sánchez Vicario; 4. G. Sabatini; 5. M. Seles; 6. Z. Garrison; 7. C. Evert; 8. H. Suková; 9. Man Maleeva-Fragnière; 10. M. J. Fernández	1. S. Graf; 2. M. Navratilova; 3. A. Sánchez Vicario; 4. G. Sabatini; 5. M. Seles; 6. C. Evert; 7. Z. Garrison; 8. H. Suková; 9. Man Maleeva-Fragnière; 10. C. Lindqvist	1. S. Graf; 2. M. Navratilova; 3. A. Sánchez Vicario; 4. G. Sabatini; 5. C. Evert; 6. M. Seles; 7. Z. Garrison; 8. H. Suková; 9. Man Maleeva-Fragnière; 10. J. Novotná

=== 1990 ===
WTA	Bud Collins	John Barrett	World Tennis
1. S. Graf; 2. M. Seles; 3. M. Navratilova; 4. M. J. Fernández; 5. G. Sabatini; 6. K. Maleeva; 7. A. Sánchez Vicario; 8. J. Capriati; 9. Man Maleeva-Fragnière; 10. Z. Garrison	1. M. Seles; 2. G. Sabatini; 3. S. Graf; 4. M. Navratilova; 5. J. Capriati; 6. A. Sánchez Vicario; 7. M. J. Fernández; 8. K. Maleeva; 9. Man Maleeva-Fragnière; 10. Z. Garrison	1. S. Graf; 2. M. Seles; 3. G. Sabatini; 4. M. Navratilova; 5. M. J. Fernández; 6. K. Maleeva; 7. Z. Garrison; 8. A. Sánchez Vicario; 9. Man Maleeva-Fragnière; 10. J. Capriati	1. M. Seles; 2. S. Graf; 3. G. Sabatini; 4. M. Navratilova; 5. M. J. Fernández; 6. J. Capriati; 7. K. Maleeva; 8. A. Sánchez Vicario; 9. Z. Garrison; 10. Man Maleeva-Fragnière

=== 1991 ===
WTA	Bud Collins	John Barrett
1. M. Seles; 2. S. Graf; 3. G. Sabatini; 4. M. Navratilova; 5. A. Sánchez Vicario; 6. J. Capriati; 7. J. Novotná; 8. M. J. Fernández; 9. C. Martínez; 10. Man Maleeva-Fragnière	1. M. Seles; 2. S. Graf; 3. G. Sabatini; 4. M. Navratilova; 5. J. Capriati; 6. A. Sánchez Vicario; 7. J. Novotná; 8. M. J. Fernández; 9. Man Maleeva-Fragnière; 10. C. Martínez	1. M. Seles; 2. S. Graf; 3. G. Sabatini; 4. M. Navratilova; 5. A. Sánchez Vicario; 6. M. J. Fernández; 7. J. Capriati; 8. J. Novotná; 9. C. Martínez; 10. Man Maleeva-Fragnière

=== 1992 ===
WTA	Bud Collins	John Barrett
1. M. Seles; 2. S. Graf; 3. G. Sabatini; 4. A. Sánchez Vicario; 5. M. Navratilova; 6. M. J. Fernández; 7. J. Capriati; 8. C. Martínez; 9. Man Maleeva-Fragnière; 10. J. Novotná	1. M. Seles; 2. S. Graf; 3. A. Sánchez Vicario; 4. J. Capriati; 5. M. Navratilova; 6. G. Sabatini; 7. M. J. Fernández; 8. C. Martínez; 9. Man Maleeva-Fragnière; 10. A. Huber	1. M. Seles; 2. S. Graf; 3. A. Sánchez Vicario; 4. J. Capriati; 5. G. Sabatini; 6. M. J. Fernández; 7. Man Maleeva-Fragnière; 8. M. Navratilova; 9. C. Martínez; 10. N. Zvereva

=== 1993 ===
WTA	Bud Collins	John Barrett
1. S. Graf; 2. A. Sánchez Vicario; 3. M. Navratilova; 4. C. Martínez; 5. G. Sabatini; 6. J. Novotná; 7. M. J. Fernández; 8. M. Seles; 9. J. Capriati; 10. A. Huber	1. S. Graf; 2. A. Sánchez Vicario; 3. M. Navratilova; 4. M. Seles; 5. J. Novotná; 6. C. Martínez; 7. M. J. Fernández; 8. G. Sabatini; 9. J. Capriati; 10. A. Huber	1. S. Graf; 2. M. Seles; 3. A. Sánchez Vicario; 4. C. Martínez; 5. M. Navratilova; 6. J. Novotná; 7. G. Sabatini; 8. A. Huber; 9. M. J. Fernández; 10. Man Maleeva-Fragnière

=== 1994 ===
WTA	Bud Collins	John Barrett
1. S. Graf; 2. A. Sánchez Vicario; 3. C. Martínez; 4. J. Novotná; 5. M. Pierce; 6. L. Davenport; 7. G. Sabatini; 8. M. Navratilova; 9. K. Date; 10. N. Zvereva	1. A. Sánchez Vicario; 2. S. Graf; 3. C. Martínez; 4. M. Navratilova; 5. M. Pierce; 6. G. Sabatini; 7. L. Davenport; 8. K. Date; 9. J. Novotná; 10. A. Huber	1. A. Sánchez Vicario; 2. S. Graf; 3. C. Martínez; 4. M. Pierce; 5. J. Novotná; 6. G. Sabatini; 7. L. Davenport; 8. M. Navratilova; 9. K. Date; 10. N. Zvereva

=== 1995 ===
WTA	Bud Collins	John Barrett
1. = S. Graf = M. Seles; 3. C. Martínez; 4. A. Sánchez Vicario; 5. K. Date; 6. M. Pierce; 7. Mag Maleeva; 8. G. Sabatini; 9. M. J. Fernández; 10. I. Majoli; 11. A. Huber	1. S. Graf; 2. A. Sánchez Vicario; 3. C. Martínez; 4. M. Pierce; 5. K. Date; 6. M. Seles; 7. M. J. Fernández; 8. Mag Maleeva; 9. J. Novotná; 10. G. Sabatini	1. S. Graf; 2. M. Seles; 3. A. Sánchez Vicario; 4. C. Martínez; 5. M. Pierce; 6. G. Sabatini; 7. K. Date; 8. M. J. Fernández; 9. J. Novotná; 10. A. Huber

=== 1996 ===
WTA	Bud Collins	John Barrett
1. S. Graf; 2. = M. Seles = A. Sánchez Vicario; 4. J. Novotná; 5. M. Hingis; 6. C. Martínez; 7. A. Huber; 8. I. Majoli; 9. K. Date; 10. L. Davenport; 11. B. Paulus	1. S. Graf; 2. M. Seles; 3. A. Sánchez Vicario; 4. C. Martínez; 5. L. Davenport; 6. J. Novotná; 7. K. Date; 8. M. Hingis; 9. A. Huber; 10. C. Rubin	1. S. Graf; 2. M. Seles; 3. A. Sánchez Vicario; 4. C. Martínez; 5. J. Novotná; 6. A. Huber; 7. L. Davenport; 8. M. Hingis; 9. K. Date; 10. A. Coetzer

=== 1997 ===
WTA	John Barrett
1. M. Hingis; 2. J. Novotná; 3. L. Davenport; 4. A. Coetzer; 5. M. Seles; 6. I. Majoli; 7. M. Pierce; 8. I. Spîrlea; 9. A. Sánchez Vicario; 10. M. J. Fernández	1. M. Hingis; 2. J. Novotná; 3. L. Davenport; 4. M. Seles; 5. I. Majoli; 6. M. Pierce; 7. A. Coetzer; 8. A. Sánchez Vicario; 9. I. Spîrlea; 10. M. J. Fernández

=== 1998 ===
WTA	John Barrett
1. L. Davenport; 2. M. Hingis; 3. J. Novotná; 4. A. Sánchez Vicario; 5. V. Williams; 6. M. Seles; 7. M. Pierce; 8. C. Martínez; 9. S. Graf; 10. N. Tauziat	1. L. Davenport; 2. M. Hingis; 3. J. Novotná; 4. A. Sánchez Vicario; 5. V. Williams; 6. M. Seles; 7. M. Pierce; 8. C. Martínez; 9. S. Graf; 10. = N. Tauziat = P. Schnyder

=== 1999 ===
WTA	John Barrett
1. M. Hingis; 2. L. Davenport; 3. V. Williams; 4. S. Williams; 5. M. Pierce; 6. M. Seles; 7. N. Tauziat; 8. B. Schett; 9. J. Halard-Decugis; 10. A. Mauresmo	1. M. Hingis; 2. L. Davenport; 3. S. Williams; 4. V. Williams; 5. S. Graf; 6. M. Pierce; 7. M. Seles; 8. N. Tauziat; 9. B. Schett; 10. J. Halard-Decugis

=== 2000 ===
WTA
1. M. Hingis
2. L. Davenport
3. V. Williams
4. M. Seles
5. C. Martínez
6. S. Williams
7. M. Pierce
8. A. Kournikova
9. A. Sánchez Vicario
10. N. Tauziat

=== 2001 ===
WTA
1. L. Davenport
2. J. Capriati
3. V. Williams
4. M. Hingis
5. K. Clijsters
6. S. Williams
7. J. Henin
8. J. Dokić
9. A. Mauresmo
10. M. Seles

=== 2002 ===
WTA
1. S. Williams
2. V. Williams
3. J. Capriati
4. K. Clijsters
5. J. Henin
6. A. Mauresmo
7. M. Seles
8. D. Hantuchová
9. J. Dokić
10. M. Hingis

=== 2003 ===
WTA
1. J. Henin-Hardenne
2. K. Clijsters
3. S. Williams
4. A. Mauresmo
5. L. Davenport
6. J. Capriati
7. A. Myskina
8. E. Dementieva
9. C. Rubin
10. A. Sugiyama

=== 2004 ===
WTA
1. L. Davenport
2. A. Mauresmo
3. A. Myskina
4. M. Sharapova
5. S. Kuznetsova
6. E. Dementieva
7. S. Williams
8. J. Henin-Hardenne
9. V. Williams
10. J. Capriati

=== 2005 ===
WTA
1. L. Davenport
2. K. Clijsters
3. A. Mauresmo
4. M. Sharapova
5. M. Pierce
6. J. Henin-Hardenne
7. P. Schnyder
8. E. Dementieva
9. N. Petrova
10. V. Williams

=== 2006 ===
WTA
1. J. Henin-Hardenne
2. M. Sharapova
3. A. Mauresmo
4. S. Kuznetsova
5. K. Clijsters
6. N. Petrova
7. M. Hingis
8. E. Dementieva
9. P. Schnyder
10. N. Vaidišová

=== 2007 ===
WTA
1. J. Henin
2. S. Kuznetsova
3. J. Janković
4. A. Ivanovic
5. M. Sharapova
6. A. Chakvetadze
7. S. Williams
8. V. Williams
9. D. Hantuchová
10. M. Bartoli

=== 2008 ===
WTA
1. J. Janković
2. S. Williams
3. D. Safina
4. E. Dementieva
5. A. Ivanovic
6. V. Williams
7. V. Zvonareva
8. S. Kuznetsova
9. M. Sharapova
10. A. Radwańska

=== 2009 ===
WTA
1. S. Williams
2. D. Safina
3. S. Kuznetsova
4. C. Wozniacki
5. E. Dementieva
6. V. Williams
7. V. Azarenka
8. J. Janković
9. V. Zvonareva
10. A. Radwańska

=== 2010 ===
WTA
1. C. Wozniacki
2. V. Zvonareva
3. K. Clijsters
4. S. Williams
5. V. Williams
6. S. Stosur
7. F. Schiavone
8. J. Janković
9. E. Dementieva
10. V. Azarenka

=== 2011 ===
WTA
1. C. Wozniacki
2. P. Kvitová
3. V. Azarenka
4. M. Sharapova
5. N. Li
6. S. Stosur
7. V. Zvonareva
8. A. Radwańska
9. M. Bartoli
10. A. Petkovic

=== 2012 ===
WTA
1. V. Azarenka
2. M. Sharapova
3. S. Williams
4. A. Radwańska
5. A. Kerber
6. S. Errani
7. N. Li
8. P. Kvitová
9. S. Stosur
10. C. Wozniacki

=== 2013 ===
WTA
1. S. Williams
2. V. Azarenka
3. N. Li
4. M. Sharapova
5. A. Radwańska
6. P. Kvitová
7. S. Errani
8. J. Janković
9. A. Kerber
10. C. Wozniacki

=== 2014 ===
WTA
1. S. Williams
2. M. Sharapova
3. S. Halep
4. P. Kvitová
5. A. Ivanovic
6. A. Radwańska
7. E. Bouchard
8. C. Wozniacki
9. N. Li
10. A. Kerber

=== 2015 ===
WTA
1. S. Williams
2. S. Halep
3. G. Muguruza
4. M. Sharapova
5. A. Radwańska
6. P. Kvitová
7. V. Williams
8. F. Pennetta
9. L. Šafářová
10. A. Kerber

=== 2016 ===
WTA
1. A. Kerber
2. S. Williams
3. A. Radwańska
4. S. Halep
5. D. Cibulková
6. K. Plíšková
7. G. Muguruza
8. M. Keys
9. S. Kuznetsova
10. J. Konta

=== 2017 ===
WTA
1. S. Halep
2. G. Muguruza
3. C. Wozniacki
4. K. Plíšková
5. V. Williams
6. E. Svitolina
7. J. Ostapenko
8. C. Garcia
9. J. Konta
10. C. Vandeweghe

=== 2018 ===
WTA
1. S. Halep
2. A. Kerber
3. C. Wozniacki
4. E. Svitolina
5. N. Osaka
6. S. Stephens
7. P. Kvitová
8. K. Plíšková
9. K. Bertens
10. D. Kasatkina

=== 2019 ===
WTA
1. A. Barty
2. K. Plíšková
3. N. Osaka
4. S. Halep
5. B. Andreescu
6. E. Svitolina
7. P. Kvitová
8. B. Bencic
9. K. Bertens
10. S. Williams

=== 2020 ===
WTA
1. A. Barty
2. S. Halep
3. N. Osaka
4. S. Kenin
5. E. Svitolina
6. K. Plíšková
7. B. Andreescu
8. P. Kvitová
9. K. Bertens
10. A. Sabalenka

=== 2021 ===
WTA
1. A. Barty
2. A. Sabalenka
3. G. Muguruza
4. K. Plíšková
5. B. Krejčíková
6. M. Sakkari
7. A. Kontaveit
8. P. Badosa
9. I. Świątek
10. O. Jabeur

=== 2022 ===
WTA
1. I. Świątek
2. O. Jabeur
3. J. Pegula
4. C. Garcia
5. A. Sabalenka
6. M. Sakkari
7. C. Gauff
8. D. Kasatkina
9. V. Kudermetova
10. S. Halep

=== 2023 ===
WTA
1. I. Świątek
2. A. Sabalenka
3. C. Gauff
4. E. Rybakina
5. J. Pegula
6. O. Jabeur
7. M. Vondroušová
8. K. Muchová
9. M. Sakkari
10. B. Krejčíková

=== 2024 ===
WTA
1. A. Sabalenka
2. I. Świątek
3. C. Gauff
4. J. Paolini
5. Q. Zheng
6. E. Rybakina
7. J. Pegula
8. E. Navarro
9. D. Kasatkina
10. B. Krejčíková

=== 2025 ===
WTA
1. A. Sabalenka
2. I. Świątek
3. C. Gauff
4. A. Anisimova
5. E. Rybakina
6. J. Pegula
7. M. Keys
8. J. Paolini
9. M. Andreeva
10. E. Alexandrova

== See also ==
- World number 1 ranked female tennis players
- List of WTA number 1 ranked singles tennis players
- Top ten ranked male tennis players
- Top ten ranked male tennis players (1912–1972)
