= Rino Tommasi =

Italian journalist and television presenter (1934–2025)

Salvatore "Rino" Tommasi (23 February 1934 – 8 January 2025) was an Italian journalist, television host, sport commentator and boxing organiser.

== Life and career ==
Tommasi was born in Verona on 23 February 1934. His father Virgilio held for 13 years the Italian record in long jumping and participated in the 1924 and 1928 Summer Olympics, while his uncle Angelo participated to the 1932 edition in high jumping.

In his youth, Tommasi played tennis and reached the second category level in Italy. In 1947 he wrote his first article for a newspaper, for the Marche edition of Il Messaggero. Later he moved to the sport newspaper Tuttosport and then La Gazzetta dello Sport (1965). He wrote for the latter for more than 40 years. He also collaborated with La Repubblica, Il Gazzettino and Il Mattino. In 1968 he was named chief of the press office of SS Lazio, a position Tommasi held for only a year. In 1970 he started publishing the tennis magazine Tennis Club.

From 1959 to 1970, Tommasi organised boxing fights in Italy, particularly at the Palazzo dello Sport in Rome. Boxers invited include Sandro Mazzinghi, Pone Kingpetch, Nino Benvenuti and Luis Manuel Rodríguez.

In 1981, Tommasi was hired by Silvio Berlusconi, then a rising television tycoon, to become director of the sport services of his network Canale 5. Ten years later he became chief of the sport activities at Tele+. In the 1980s Tommasi hosted the TV show La grande boxe, dedicated to the most famous boxing fights. His main television activity was commenting on boxing and, starting from the 1990s, tennis games with his friend Gianni Clerici, initially on TV Koper-Capodistria, a Yugoslav channel also airing in Italy, and then moving to pay-TV channels such as Tele+ and finally (until 2010) Sky Sport. He also collaborated with Dahlia TV.

In total, Tommasi commented on more than 400 boxing fights, 7 editions of the NFL Super Bowl and 149 Grand Slam tennis tournaments.

Tommasi died in Verona on 8 January 2025, at the age of 90.
