= List of tennis rivalries =

In tennis history there have been a number of notable rivalries. This list reflects some of the great rivalries.

For the pre-open era, complete statistics on all matches is somewhat difficult to obtain in definitive form. In many years there were significant numbers of minor events and exhibition matches outside the designated tours, some of which were not reported in newspapers or recorded by the respective amateur or professional tour management. The approximate nature of these results should be understood and kept in mind while reading this data.

For the purpose of this article only, the criteria for inclusion are (all must be met):

- Both players must have a career high ranking of world No. 3 or better, and at least one of them must have reached No. 1.
- Both must have met multiple times in semifinal or final stages of Grand Slam events (or Pro Slam and also WCCC and WHCC count).
- At least 12 of the career match-ups between them must be in main (regular) tour or circuit series of tournaments.

== Men ==
=== Open Era ===
* Active rivalries indicated in bold.

Rivalry	Period	All tournaments				Grand Slam tournaments				Ref
Rivalry	Period	All rounds		Finals		All rounds		Finals		Ref
Rivalry	Period	Matches	Won–Lost	Matches	Won-Lost	Matches	Won-Lost	Matches	Won-Lost	Ref
Djokovic–Nadal	2006–2024	60	31–29	28	15–13	18	7–11	9	4–5	
Djokovic–Federer	2006–2020	50	27–23	20*	13–6	17	11–6	5	4–1	
Federer–Nadal	2004–2019	40	16–24	24	10–14	14	4–10	9	3–6	
Lendl–McEnroe	1980–1992	36	21–15	18*	7–10	10	7–3	3	2–1	
Djokovic–Murray	2006–2017	36	25–11	19	11–8	10	8–2	7	5–2	
Connors–Lendl	1979–1992	35	13–22	7*	4–2	7	3–4	2	2–0	
Becker–Edberg	1984–1996	35	25–10	16	11–5	4	1–3	3	1–2	
Connors–McEnroe	1977–1991	34	14–20	15*	7–7	9	3–6	2	1–1	
Agassi–Sampras	1989–2002	34	14–20	16	7–9	9	3–6	5	1–4	
Ferrer–Nadal	2004–2019	32	6–26	8	0–8	7	2–5	1	0–1	
Edberg–Lendl	1984–1992	27	14–13	7	3–4	9	5–4	1	0–1	
Federer–Hewitt	1999–2014	27	18–9	5	3–2	8	8–0	1	1–0	
Djokovic–Wawrinka	2006–2023	27	21–6	5	2–3	9	5–4	2	0–2	
Federer–Wawrinka	2005–2019	26	23–3	2	1–1	8	7–1	0	0	
Federer–Murray	2005–2015	25	14–11	8	5–3	6	5–1	3	3–0	
Federer–Del Potro	2007–2018	25	18–7	6	2–4	7	5–2	1	0–1	
Federer–Roddick	2001–2012	24	21–3	7	7–0	8	8–0	4	4–0	
Murray–Wawrinka	2005–2024	24	13–10	2	2–0	8	3–5	0	0–0	
Murray–Nadal	2007–2016	24	7-17	4	3-1	9	2-7	0	0	
Borg–Vilas	1973–1980	23	18–5	10*	8–1	3	3–0	2	2–0	
Borg–Connors	1973–1981	23	15–8	13	8–5	8	5–3	4	2–2	
Lendl–Wilander	1982–1994	22	15–7	9	6–3	9	5–4	5	2–3	
Agassi–Chang	1988–2003	22	15–7	4	3–1	5	3–2	0	0	
Nadal–Wawrinka	2007–2019	22	19–3	4	3–1	4	3–1	2	1–1	
Connors–Gerulaitis	1974–1985	21	17–4	5*	4–0	3	2–1	0	0	
Becker–Lendl	1985–1993	21	10–11	13	7–6	6	5–1	3	3–0	
Chang–Edberg	1988–1996	21	9–12	4	3–1	5	1–4	1	1–0	
Davydenko–Federer	2002–2013	21	2–19	2	0–2	6	0–6	0	0	
Djokovic–Ferrer	2004–2015	21	16–5	3	3–0	5	5–0	0	0	
Edberg–Wilander	1983–1995	20	9–11	5	3–2	5	2–3	1	1–0	
Courier–Sampras	1988–1999	20	4–16	4	0–4	8	2–6	1	0–1	
Chang–Sampras	1989–2001	20	8–12	3	0–3	5	1–4	1	0–1	
Becker–Ivanišević	1990–1998	19	10–9	3	3–0	3	1–2	0	0	
Becker–Sampras	1990–1997	19	7–12	7	1–6	3	0–3	1	0–1	
Djokovic–Del Potro	2007–2019	19	15–4	2	2–0	5	5–0	1	1–0	
Ivanišević–Sampras	1990–1999	18	6–12	4	1–3	5	1–4	2	0–2	
Newcombe–Rosewall	1970–1974	17	8–9	6	3–3	6	3–3	1	1–0	
Borg–Gerulaitis	1974–1981	17	17–0	7	7–0	5	5–0	1	1–0	
Nadal–Del Potro	2007–2018	17	11–6	1	1–0	7	5–2	0	0	
**Alcaraz–Sinner***	2021–	17	10–7	9	5–4	6	4–2	3	2–1	
Nadal–Thiem	2014–2024	16	10–6	4	4–0	6	5–1	2	2–0	
**Djokovic–Medvedev***	2017–	16	11–5	4	3–1	4	3–1	3	2–1	
**Medvedev–Tsitsipas***	2018–	16	11–5	0	0	4	3–1	0	0	
Borg–Năstase	1972–1980	15	10–5	5	2–3	3	3–0	1	1–0	
Ashe–Laver	1959–1976	15	2–13	2	0–2	4	0–4	0	0	
Agassi–Rafter	1993–2001	15	10–5	0	0	7	4–3	0	0	
**Djokovic–Tsitsipas***	2018–	15	13–2	6	6–0	4	4–0	2	2–0	
**Sinner–Zverev***	2020–	15	11–4	4	4–0	5	3–2	2	2–0	
**Djokovic–Zverev***	2017–	15	10–5	2	0–2	5	4–1	0	0	
Laver–Roche	1968–1972	14	9–5	9	5–4	3	3–0	2	2–0	
Borg–McEnroe	1978–1981	14	7–7	9	4–5	4	1–3	4	1–3	
Gerulaitis–McEnroe	1979–1984	14	3–11	5	1–4	2	0–2	1	0–1	
Agassi–Becker	1988–1999	14	10–4	1	1–0	5	4–1	0	0	
Edberg–Sampras	1990–1995	14	6–8	1	1–0	2	2–0	1	1–0	
Federer–Raonic	2012–2018	14	11–3	3	2–1	4	3–1	0	0	
**Alcaraz–Zverev***	2021–	14	8–6	3	3–0	5	3–2	1	1–0	
McEnroe–Wilander	1982–1989	13	7–6	3	1–2	5	2–3	0	0	
Murray–Raonic	2012–2020	13	9–4	2	2–0	3	3–0	1	1–0	
Agassi–Courier	1989–1996	12	5–7	2	0–2	6	2–4	1	0–1	
Courier–Stich	1990–1997	12	5–7	0	0	4	2–2	0	0	
Agassi–Kafelnikov	1994–2003	12	8–4	2	2–0	5	4–1	1	1–0	
Federer–Safin	2001–2009	12	10–2	3	3–0	5	4–1	1	1–0	
Djokovic–Thiem	2014–2020	12	7–5	1	1–0	4	2–2	1	1–0	
Thiem–Zverev	2016–2023	12	8–4	3	2–1	4	4–0	1	1–0	
**Djokovic–Sinner***	2021–	12	5–7	2	1–1	7	3–4	0	0	

* Including walkovers or abandoned matches (not counted in head to heads, same as the official ATP head to heads).

=== Amateur Era ===
Rivalry	Period	Meetings	Grand Slam	Pro Slam	ILTF Major	All matches	All finals	Ref
Gonzales–Rosewall	1957–1970	204		2–3		117–87	6–6	
Gonzales–Hoad	1957–1971	181		3–2		104-77		
Laver–Rosewall	1963–1976	164	1–1	4–6		89–75	36–20	
Vines–Perry	1937–1938	154		1–0		84–70		
Gonzales–Kramer	1949–1954	140		1–0		40–100		
Hoad–Rosewall	1953–1967	135	2–2	0–5		51-84		
Gonzales–Segura	1951–1965	134		8–3		96–38		
Budge–Riggs	1935–1955	119		4–4		65–55		
Kramer–Sedgman	1953–1956	110				61–49		
Nüsslein–Tilden	1931–1939	104		7–2		39–65		
Gimeno–Laver	1960–1971	96	0–1	0–5		31–65		
Vines–Tilden	1927–1940	73		2–1		47–26		
Emerson–Laver	1958–1975	72	2–7			21–51	10–22	
Anderson–Cooper	1955–1962	68	1–3	0–2		25–43		
Gonzales–Laver	1964–1970	65	0–1	0–2		22–43	7–14	
Hoad–Laver	1963-1966	60				22-38		
Budge–Tilden	1939–1945	50		3–0		41–9		
Laver–Stolle	1956–1974	48	2–0	3–0		39–9		
Cochet–Tilden	1926–1939	35	4–1	0–2		12–23	2–2	
Laver–Olmedo	1959–1971	30	0–1	3–0		26–4		
Crawford–Quist	1933–1950	25	2–3			9–16		
Laver–Sedgman	1963–1965	20		3–0		18–2		
Mahony–Pim	1888–1898	18	0–3			3–15	2–7	
H. L. Doherty–Mahony	1896–1904	18	3–0		0–1	14–4	6–2	
Johnston–Tilden	1919–1926	17	1–6			6–12		
Decugis–Wilding	1907–1914	17			0–2	3–14		
Borotra–Lacoste	1921–1929	17	3–5			5–12		
Crawford–Perry	1930–1936	17	2–5			6–11		
Larned–Wright	1899–1908	16	4–1			12–4		
Borotra–Cochet	1922–1949	16	3–3		0–1	8–8		
Gore–Wilding	1905–1912	14	2–2			9–5	5–3	

== Women ==
=== Open Era ===
* Active rivalries indicated in bold.

Rivalry	Period	All tournaments		Grand Slam tournaments				Ref
Rivalry	Period	All tournaments		All rounds		Finals		Ref
Rivalry	Period	Matches	Won–Lost	Matches	Won–Lost	Matches	Won–Lost	Ref
Evert–Navratilova	1973–1988	80	37–43	22	8–14	14	4–10	
Evert–Wade	1971–1982	46	40–6	3	2–1	0	0	
Navratilova–Shriver	1978–1992	43	40–3	9	7–2	0	0	
Goolagong–Wade	1970–1983	40	30–10	6	5–1	1	0–1	
Graf–Sabatini	1985–1995	40	29–11	12	11–1	3	2–1	
Evert–Goolagong	1972–1983	39	26–13	10	6–4	5	3–2	
Mandlikova–Navratilova	1980–1989	36	7–29	10	4–6	3	2–1	
Graf–Sánchez Vicario	1988–1996	36	28–8	13	9–4	7	5–2	
Navratilova–Turnbull	1973–1988	34	29–5	4	2–2	0	0	
Court–Casals	1967–1977	33	30–3	6	6–0	1	1–0	
Austin–Navratilova	1977–1983	33	13–20	4	2–2	1	1–0	
Graf–Novotná	1987–1999	33	29–4	11	10–1	1	1–0	
King–Wade	1968–1981	31	22–9	6	5–1	1	0–1	
S. Williams–V. Williams	1998–2020	31	19–12	16	11–5	9	7–2	
Goolagong–Navratilova	1973–1982	27	12–15	4	2–2	1	1–0	
Davenport–V. Williams	1997–2005	27	14–13	9	4–5	3	0–3	
Evert–King	1971–1983	26	19–7	9	6–3	1	0–1	
Evert–Mandlikova	1980–1989	26	19–7	13	10–3	3	3–0	
Davenport–Hingis	1995–2006	25	14–11	4	3–1	2	2–0	
Clijsters–Henin	1998–2010	25	13–12	8	3–5	3	0–3	
Sabatini–Sánchez Vicario	1986–1995	23	12–11	5	2–3	0	0	
Sánchez Vicario–Seles	1989–2002	23	3–20	5	1–4	3	1–2	
Azarenka–S. Williams	2008–2020	23	5–18	11	1–10	2	0–2	
Court–Goolagong	1968–1975	22	17–5	8	6–2	4	3–1	
Evert–Turnbull	1976–1987	22	21–1	6	6–0	2	2–0	
Sharapova–S. Williams	2004–2019	22	2–20	9	1–8	4	1–3	
Evert–Shriver	1978–1988	21	18–3	2	2–0	1	1–0	
Navratilova–Sabatini	1986–1994	21	15-6	4	4–0	0	0	
Novotná–Sánchez Vicario	1987–1998	21	11–10	5	2–3	0	0	
Martínez–Seles	1989–2002	21	1–20	4	0–4	0	0	
Hingis–V. Williams	1997–2006	21	11–10	6	4–2	1	1–0	
Evert–Jaeger	1980–1984	20	17–3	5	4–1	0	0	
Hingis–Seles	1996–2002	20	15–5	7	5–2	0	0	
Henin–Kuznetsova	2003–2011	19	16–3	6	5–1	2	2–0	
Graf–Navratilova	1985–1994	18	9–9	9	4–5	6	4–2	
Martínez–Sánchez Vicario	1992–2002	18	4–14	3	1–2	0	0	
**Rybakina–Sabalenka***	2019–	18	8–10	4	2–2	3	2–1	
Austin–Evert	1977–1982	17	8–9	4	1–3	1	1–0	
Navratilova–Seles	1989–1993	17	7–10	2	0–2	1	0–1	
Clijsters–Davenport	2000–2005	17	9–8	6	1–5	0	0	
Hingis–Pierce	1994–2000	16	10–6	4	3–1	1	1–0	
**Gauff–Świątek***	2021–	16	5–11	3	0–3	1	0–1	
Goolagong–King	1971–1980	15	4–11	6	1–5	4	0–4	
Jaeger–Navratilova	1980–1983	15	4–11	2	0–2	2	0–2	
Graf–Seles	1989–1999	15	10–5	10	6–4	6	3–3	
Li–Sharapova	2005–2014	15	5–10	5	2–3	0	0	
Azarenka–Sharapova	2007–2015	15	7–8	3	2–1	1	1–0	
Evert–Graf	1985–1989	14	6–8	3	1–2	1	0–1	
Sabatini–Seles	1988–1996	14	3–11	3	0–3	0	0	
Graf–Martínez	1989–1996	14	13–1	6	6–0	0	0	
Capriati–Seles	1990–2002	14	5–9	6	1–5	0	0	
Hingis–Martínez	1995–2001	14	11–3	2	2–0	1	1–0	
Davenport–S. Williams	1997–2005	14	4–10	5	1–4	1	0–1	
Henin–Mauresmo	1999–2007	14	8–6	3	0–3	2	0–2	
Kuznetsova–Safina	2000–2009	14	6–8	3	2–1	1	1–0	
Henin–S. Williams	2001–2010	14	6–8	7	4–3	1	0–1	
Ivanovic–Sharapova	2006–2015	14	4–10	2	1–1	1	0–1	
**Pegula–Sabalenka***	2020–	14	4–10	4	0–4	1	0-1	
Court–Evert (Note: Evert – Court head-to-head: 1970:, 1972:, 1973:, 1975: 1977)	1970–1977	13	4–9	3	2–1	1	1–0	
Hingis–S. Williams	1998–2002	13	6–7	3	1–2	1	0–1	
Clijsters–V. Williams	2001–2010	13	7–6	5	3–2	0	0	
**Sabalenka–Świątek***	2021–	13	5–8	2	1–1	0	0–0	
**Gauff–Sabalenka***	2020–	13	6–7	3	2–1	2	2-0	
Graf–Shriver	1985–1993	12	9–3	6	5–1	0	0	
Hingis–Novotná	1995–1999	12	9–3	4	3–1	1	1–0	
Capriati–Davenport	1997–2003	12	3–9	4	1–3	0	0	
Mauresmo–S. Williams	1999–2008	12	2–10	6	1–5	0	0	
Dementieva–S. Williams	2003–2010	12	5–7	3	0–3	0	0	
Li–S. Williams	2006–2014	12	1–11	4	0–4	0	0	

≈ minimum confirmed (early records are incomplete)

=== Amateur Era ===
Rivalry	Period	Meetings	Grand Slam	All matches
Brough Clapp–duPont	1942–1956	40	3–1	25–15
King–Jones	1959–1971	35	7–2	26–9
Court–King	1962–1973	32	6–4	22–10
Bingley–Cooper	1893–1901	26	4–1	19–6–1
Court–Bueno	1960–1969	24	5–3	17–6
Lenglen–Ryan	1914–1925	21	5–0	21–0
McKane-Godfree–Ryan	1919–1927	21	2–3	11–10
Mathieu–Sperling	1931–1939	15	0–5	1–14
Jacobs–Round	1929–1939	14	1–3	9–5
Mallory–Wills	1922–1929	13	1–3	6–7
Jacobs–Wills	1925–1933	12	1–6	1–11

== See also ==
- List of sports rivalries
- Big Three (tennis)
