= Lendl–Wilander rivalry =

Tennis rivalry

The Lendl–Wilander rivalry was a tennis rivalry between Ivan Lendl and Mats Wilander. They competed 22 times between 1982 and 1994, with Lendl leading their head-to-head record 15–7.

This rivalry, which featured 5 Grand Slam finals, is tied for the fourth most of any rivalry in the Tour. At the time of Wilander's 1988 US Open triumph, their 5 Major finals were the most contested between any two players.

== Head-to-head ==
Legend	Lendl	Wilander
Grand Slam	5	4
Masters Grand Prix	2	0
ATP International Series	8	2
Davis Cup	0	1
Total	15	7

=== Singles (22) ===
Lendl 15 – Wilander 7

No.	Year	Tournament	Surface	Round	Winner	Score	Lendl	Wilander
1.	1982	French Open	Clay	Last 16	Wilander	4–6, 7–5, 3–6, 6–4, 6–2	0	1
2.	1982	US Open	Hard	Last 16	Lendl	6–2, 6–2, 6–2	1	1
3.	1982	Barcelona Open	Clay	Quarterfinals	Wilander	7–6, 6–1	1	2
4.	1983	Brussels Indoor	Carpet	Semifinals	Lendl	7–6, 7–6	2	2
5.	1983	Cincinnati Open	Hard	Semifinals	Wilander	6–0, 6–3	2	3
6.	1983	US Open	Hard	Quarterfinals	Lendl	6–4, 6–4, 7–6^{(7–4)}	3	3
7.	1983	Australian Open	Grass	Final	Wilander	6–1, 6–4, 6–4	3	4
8.	1984	World Team Cup	Clay	Round Robin	Lendl	7–6, 7–5	4	4
9.	1984	French Open	Clay	Semifinals	Lendl	6–3, 6–3, 7–5	5	4
10.	1984	Davis Cup	Clay	Semifinals	Wilander	6–3, 4–6, 6–2	5	5
11.	1985	Monte Carlo Open	Clay	Final	Lendl	6–1, 6–3, 4–6, 6–4	6	5
12.	1985	World Team Cup	Clay	Round Robin	Lendl	6–4, 6–3	7	5
13.	1985	French Open	Clay	Final	Wilander	3–6, 6–4, 6–2, 6–2	7	6
14.	1985	Tokyo Indoor	Carpet	Final	Lendl	6–0, 6–4	8	6
15.	1986	Miami Open	Hard	Final	Lendl	3–6, 6–1, 7–6^{(7–5)}, 6–4	9	6
16.	1986	Masters Grand Prix	Carpet	Semifinals	Lendl	6–4, 6–2	10	6
17.	1987	French Open	Clay	Final	Lendl	7–5, 6–2, 3–6, 7–6^{(7–3)}	11	6
18.	1987	US Open	Hard	Final	Lendl	6–7^{(7–9)}, 6–0, 7–6^{(7–4)}, 6–4	12	6
19.	1987	Masters Grand Prix	Carpet	Final	Lendl	6–2, 6–2, 6–3	13	6
20.	1988	US Open	Hard	Final	Wilander	6–4, 4–6, 6–3, 5–7, 6–4	13	7
21.	1994	Sydney International	Hard	Last 32	Lendl	6–2, 6–1	14	7
22.	1994	Delray Beach Open	Clay	Last 16	Lendl	6–3, 4–6, 7–5	15	7

== Breakdown of their rivalry ==
- All matches: (22) Lendl 15–7
- All finals: Lendl 6–3
  - Carpet courts: Lendl 4–0
  - Clay courts: Lendl 6–4
  - Grass courts: Wilander 1–0
  - Hard courts: Lendl 5–2
  - Davis Cup matches: Wilander 1–0
  - Grand Slam finals: Wilander 3–2
  - Grand Slam matches: Lendl 5–4
  - Year-End Championships finals: Lendl 1–0
  - Year-End Championships matches: Lendl 2–0

== See also ==
- List of tennis rivalries
