= Emerson–Laver rivalry =

Tennis rivalry

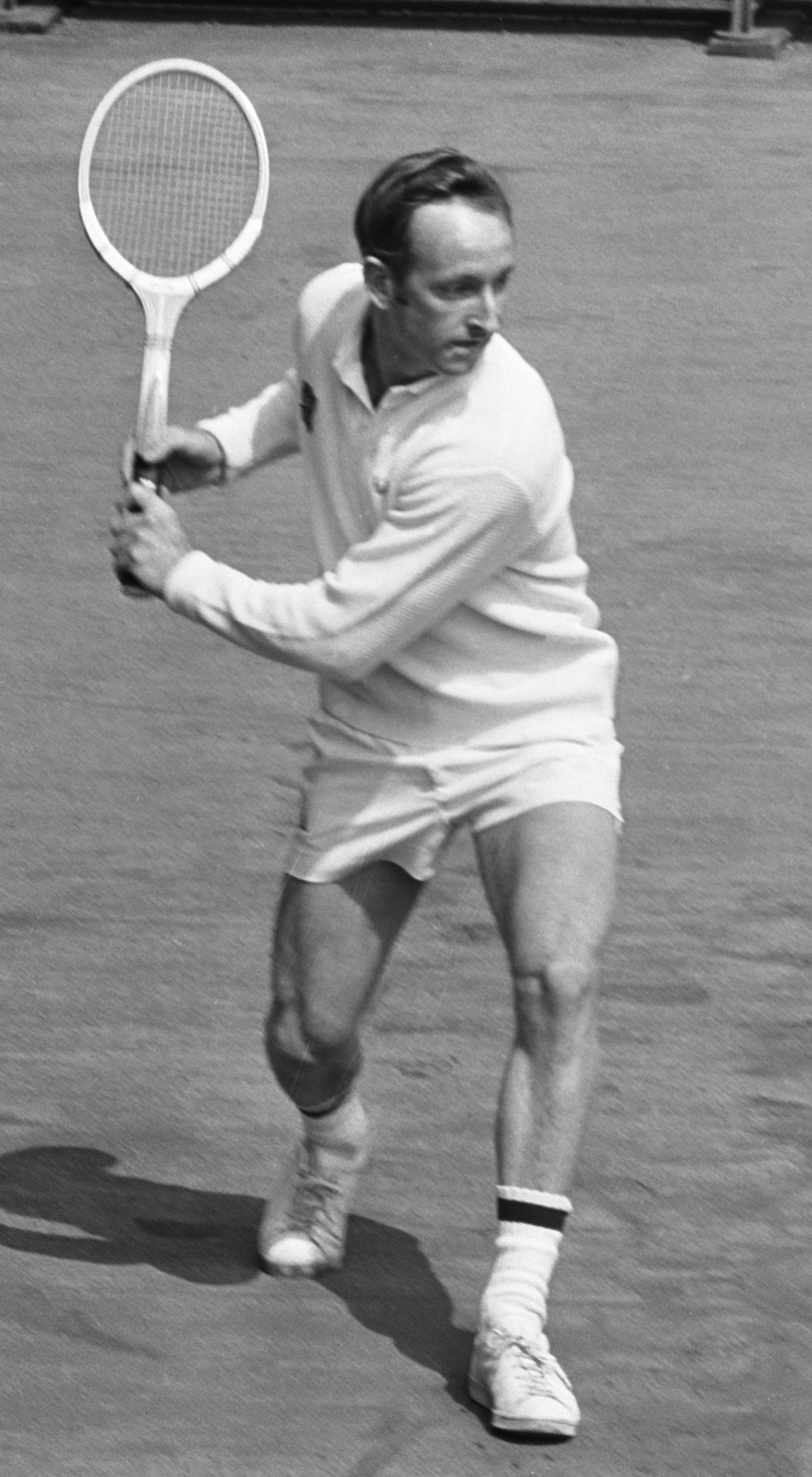
Rod Laver (World No. 1
19 Major singles)

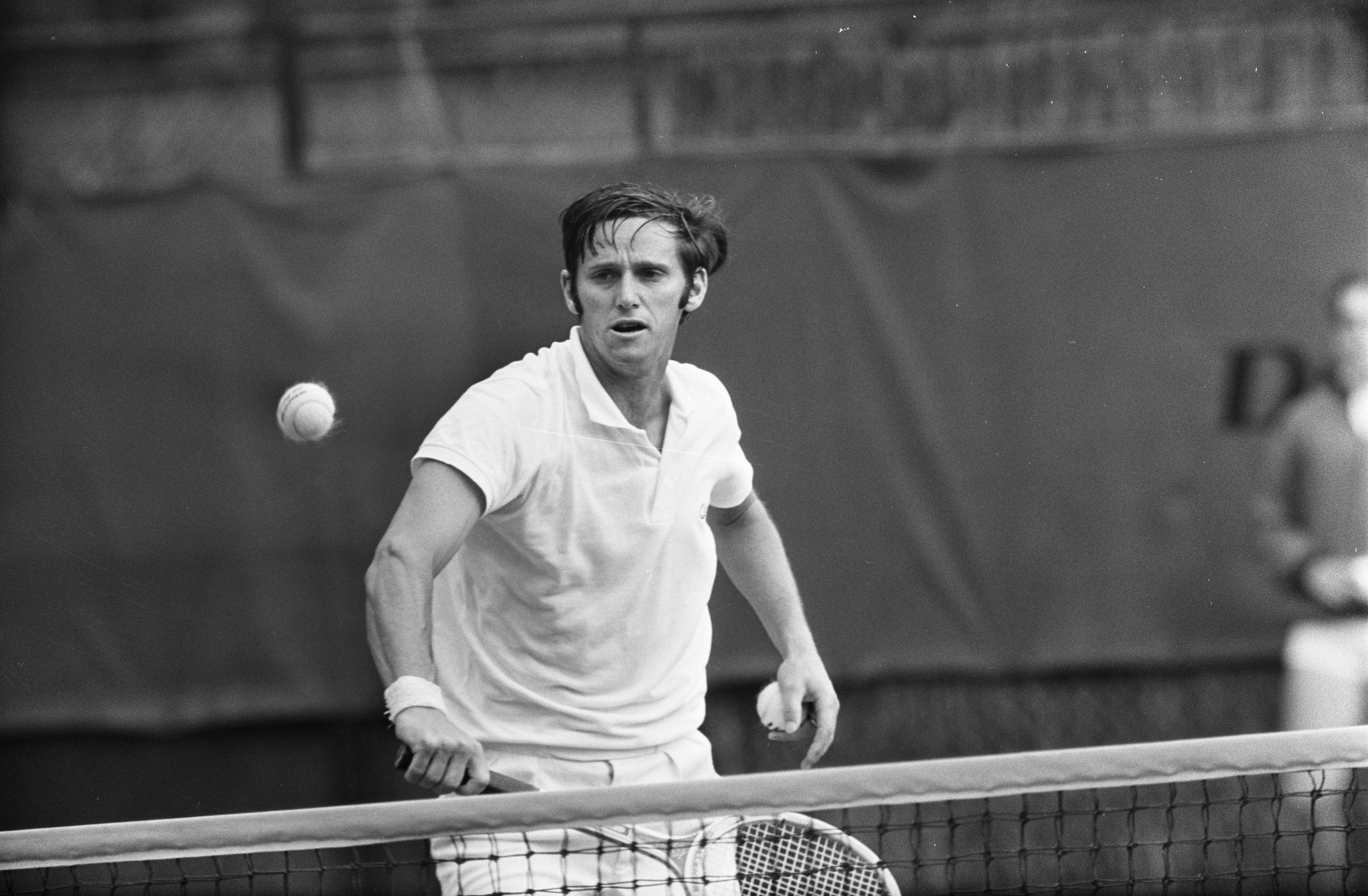
Roy Emerson (World No. 1
12 Major singles)

The Emerson–Laver rivalry was a tennis rivalry between Roy Emerson and Rod Laver. The two Queenslanders first met on the senior amateur tour in 1958 and dominated the amateur circuit until 1962, before Laver went pro. When open tennis arrived in 1968, Emerson went pro and resumed his prolific rivalry with Laver.

== Analysis ==
The statistics shows a strong dominance of Laver over Emerson, two years his senior. He dominated him in the amateur era and the open era over all surfaces. Emerson spent his best years in the amateur circuit, and during 5 years he could not face Laver.

=== Head-to-head tallies ===
The following is a breakdown of their documented head-to-head results:

Player	1958	1959	1960	1961	1962	1963–1967	1968	1969	1970	1971	1972	1973	1974	1975	Total
(Australia) Rod Laver	1	0	2	10	7	0	6	6	6	7	0	5	0	1	51
(Australia) Roy Emerson	0	2	1	5	4	0	7	1	0	0	0	0	0	1	21

- All Matches: Laver 51-21
- All Finals: Laver 22–10
- Grand Slams: Laver 7–2

== List of all matches ==
No.	Date	Event	Round	Surface	Winner	Score
1	1958	Queensland Champs	Quarterfinal	Grass	Laver	6–3, 6–1, 8–6
2	1959–09	Queensland Champs	Semifinal	Grass	Emerson	7–9, 6–4, 8–6, 10–12, 6–3
3	1959–11	New South Wales Champs	Semifinal	Grass	Emerson	6–0, 3–6, 3–6, 6–4, 6–3
4	1960–01	Australian Championships	Semifinal	Grass	Laver	4–6, 6–1, 9–7, 3–6, 7–5
5	1960–07	Wimbledon Championships	Quarterfinal	Grass	Laver	6–4, 5–7, 6–4, 6–4
6	1960–10	Queensland Champs	Semifinal	Grass	Emerson	6–1, 2–6, 6–2, 7–9, 6–3
7	1961-01-30	Australian Championships	Final	Grass	Emerson	1–6, 6–3, 7–5, 6–4
8	1961-02-06	New Zealand Champs	Final	Grass	Laver	4–6, 6–3, 6–2, 3–6, 7–5
9	1961-02-20	Mexican Champs	Final		Emerson	4–6, 6–4, 6–4, 6–2
10	1961-02-26	Saint Andrews Invitational	Final	Grass	Laver	4–6, 6–4, 6–3
11	1961–03	Altamira Invitational, Caracas	Semifinal	Hard	Laver	9–7, 2–6, 6–3
12	1961	Barranquilla	Semifinal		Laver	6–3, 6–2, 6–4
13	1961-04-10	River Oaks Champs	Final	Clay	Laver	7–5, 7–5, 1–6, 6–3
14	1961-04-29	British Hard Court	Final	Clay	Emerson	8–6, 6–4, 6–0
15	1961-08-20	Kitzbuhel Alpenland Champs	Final	Clay	Emerson	6–3, 6–3, 3–6, 0–6, 6–2
16	1961-08-27	Poertschach	Final	Clay	Laver	2–6, 6–3, 7–5
17	1961-09-09	U.S. Championships	Final	Grass	Emerson	7–5, 6–3, 6–2
18	1961-10-23	Queensland Hard Court Champs	Final	Clay	Laver	7–5, 6–3
19	1961-10-30	Queensland Champs	Final	Grass	Laver	4–6, 4–6, 6–0, 8–6, 6–3
20	1961-12-04	Victorian Champs	Final	Grass	Laver	4–6, 8–6, 9–7, 6–3
21	1961-12-18	New South Wales Champ	Final	Grass	Laver	8–6, 6–3, 3–6, 4–6, 6–4
22	1962–01	Australian Championships	Final	Grass	Laver	8–6, 0–6, 6–4, 6–4
23	1962-03-11	Montego Bay Champs	Final		Emerson	8–6, 7–5, 4–6, 3–6, 6–2
24	1962-03-19	Altamira Invitational, Caracas	Final	Hard	Laver	9–7, 6–2, 6–0
25	1962-04-01	Caribe Hilton International, San Juan	Final		Emerson	7–5, 7–5
26	1962-04-08	Saint Petersburg Invitational	Final		Emerson	6–1, 6–4, 6–1
27	1962-04-09	River Oaks Champ, Texas	Final	Clay	Laver	6–1, 7–5, 7–5
28	1962-05-07	Italian Champs	Final	Clay	Laver	6–2, 1–6, 3–6, 6–3, 6–1
29	1962-05-21	French Championships	Final	Clay	Laver	3–6, 2–6, 6–3, 9–7, 6–2
30	1962-06-18	Queen's Club Champ	Final	Grass	Laver	6–4, 7–5
31	1962-08-27	U.S. Championships	Final	Grass	Laver	6–2, 6–4, 5–7, 6–4
32	1962-09-24	Pacific Southwest, Los Angeles	Final	Hard	Emerson	16–14, 6–3
33	1968–04-13	Hollywood Pro	Semifinal		Emerson	6–4, 6–1
34	1968-04-18	Paris Pro NTL	Round 1		Laver	7–5, 6–2
35	1968-04-21	Bordeaux			Emerson	6-4, 6–4
36	1968–05-17	M.S.G. Pro Champs, New York	Semifinal	Indoor	Laver	6–2, 6–2
37	1968–07-19	NTL Los Angeles	Semifinal	Hard	Laver	7–5, 6–2
38	1968-08-03	Honolulu	One-night stand	Hard (O)	Emerson	6-4, 4-6, 6-4
39	1968-08-04	Honolulu	One-night stand	Hard (O)	Laver	6-3, 1-6, 14-12
40	1968-09-30	Midland Pro	Semifinal		Emerson	6–4, 6–4
41	1968–10-23	São Paulo	Round Robin		Laver	6–1, 10–8
42	1968–10-28	La Paz	Round Robin		Laver	6–4, 6–2
43	1968-11-01	Lima	Round Robin		Emerson	8–6, 6–4
44	1968-11-10	South American Open, Buenos Aires	Final	Clay	Emerson	9–7, 6–4, 6–4
45	1968-11-15	Wembley Pro	Round 1		Emerson	6–3, 9–7
46	1969–01	Australian Open	Round 3	Grass	Laver	6–2, 6–4, 3–6, 9–7
47	1969	Miami	Quarterfinal		Laver	5–7, 6–3, 6–4
48	1969	Tokyo	Round Robin		Emerson	6–4, 6–5
49	1969-05-12	M.S.G. Invitational New York	Final	Indoor	Laver	6–2, 4–6, 6–1
50	1969–09	U.S. Open	Quarterfinal	Grass	Laver	4–6, 8–6, 13–11, 6–4
51	1969–12	Basle	One night stand	indoor	Laver	6–3, 6–8, 6–4, 3–6, 6–2
52	1969–12	Madrid Pro	semi-final	indoor	Laver	10–4 (pro-set)
53	1970	Philadelphia	Round 3		Laver	4–6, 6–3, 6–4
54	1970	Las Vegas	Semifinal		Laver	6–3, 3–6, 6–2, 3–6, 6–3
55	1970	Saint Louis	Semifinal		Laver	4–6, 7–5, 6–3
56	1970-08-10	Bretton Woods	Final	Clay	Laver	6–3, 6–3
57	1970-08-17	National Invitation WCT, Fort Worth Texas	Final	Hard	Laver	6–3, 7–5
58	1970-09-28	Rothman's International WCT, Vancouver	Final		Laver	6–2, 6–1, 6–2
59	1971	Champions Tennis Classic, Philadelphia	Round Robin		Laver	6–2, 6–3, 7–5
60	1971	Champions Tennis Classic, New Haven	Round Robin		Laver	6–3, 5–7, 6–3, 3–6, 6–3
61	1971-04-03	Miami	Semifinal		Laver	2–6, 6–3, 7–5
62	1971-08	Quebec	Quarterfinal		Laver	3–6, 7–6, 7–6
63	1971-08	Fort Worth	Semifinal		Laver	6–1, 6–4
64	1971-08-25	Baton Rouge	Final		Laver	6–7, 7-5, 6-1
65	1971	San Francisco	Round 3		Laver	6–7, 6–4, 6–0
66	1973–01	Miami WCT	Quarterfinal	Hard	Laver	6–4, 3–6, 6–2
67	1973-01-30	Richmond WCT	Final	Carpet	Laver	6–4, 6–3
68	1973-02-11	Toronto WCT	Final	Carpet	Laver	6–3, 6–4
69	1973	Brussels WCT	Semifinal		Laver	4–6, 6–4, 6–1
70	1973	WCT Finals Dallas	Round 1		Laver	6–4, 6–2, 6–1
71	1975–03	WCT São Paulo	Round 2	Carpet	Laver	6–3, 6–2
72	1975–06-04	Montreal	Challenge Match	Carpet	Emerson	6–2, 3-6, 6–2

== See also ==
- List of tennis rivalries

== Sources ==
- Joe McCauley, The History of Professional Tennis, London 2001
- World Tennis (The US Magazine)
- World of Tennis (Annuals edited by John Barrett)
