= Sharapova–S. Williams rivalry =

Tennis domination

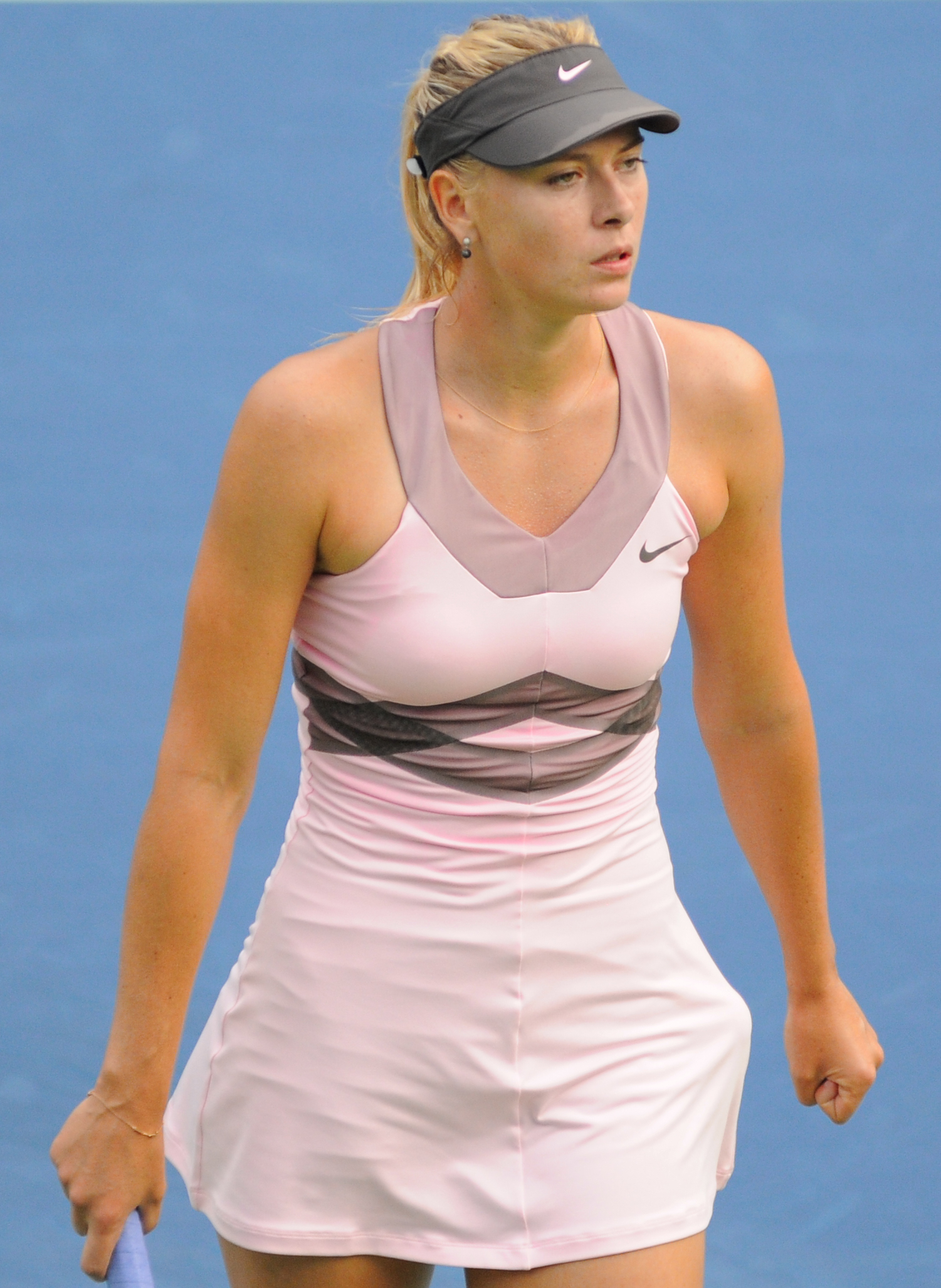
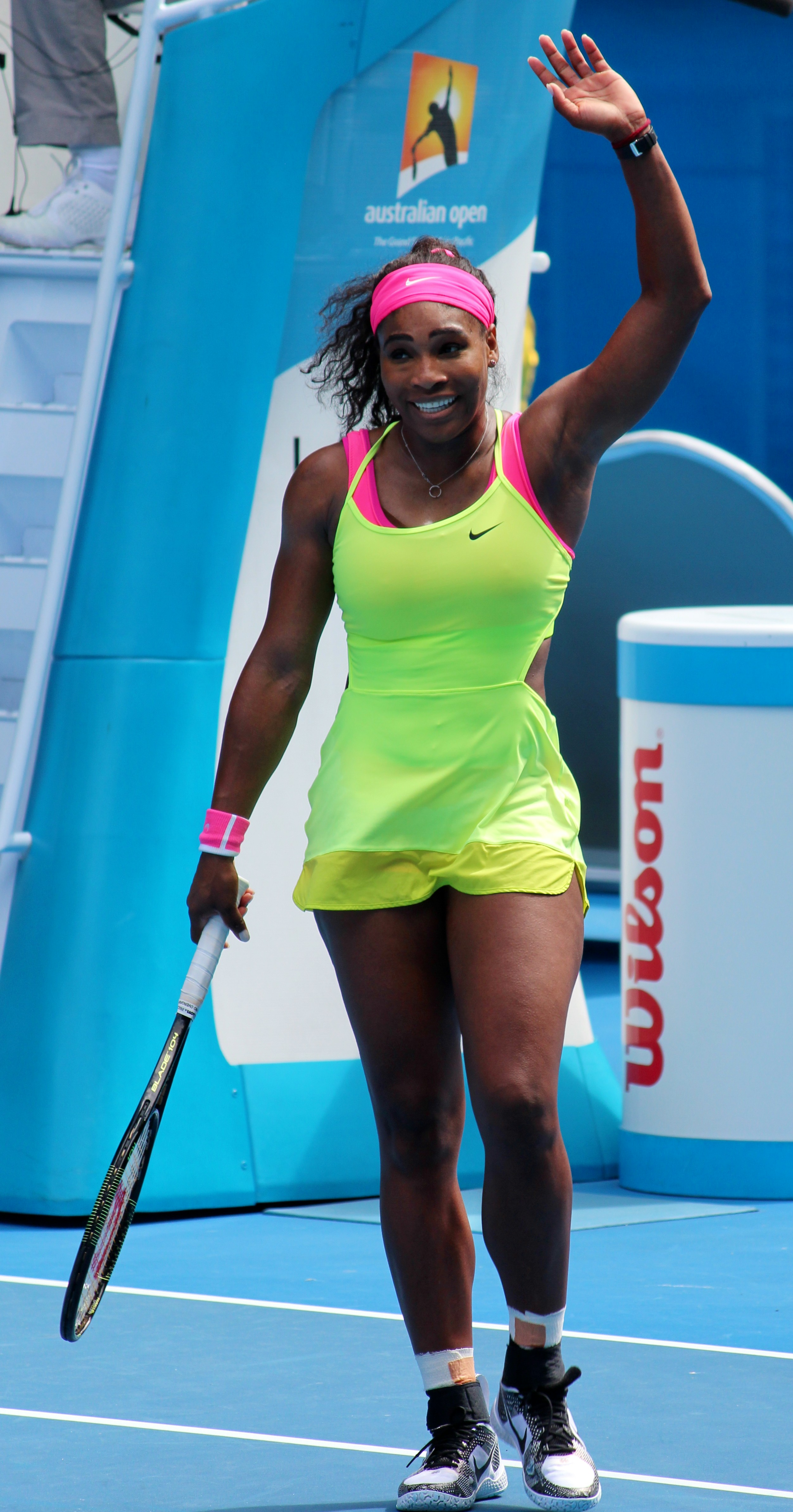
Maria Sharapova (left) won five singles majors and held the world No. 1 singles position for 21 weeks. Serena Williams (right) won 23 singles majors and held the No. 1 singles position for 319 weeks.

The S. Williams-Sharapova domination was a tennis rivalry between Maria Sharapova and Serena Williams, who met 22 times between 2004 and 2019. Williams dominates their head-to-head 20–2, including 8–1 at the majors and 3–1 in major finals. Williams described her view on the rivalry before their encounter in the 2015 Australian Open final: "I take a lot of pride in it. I think my game matches up well against her. I love playing her. I think it's fun. I love her intensity."

The pair's rivalry was a significant part of both players' careers, as the most visible women tennis players of the 2000s and 2010s. It was initially competitive, with Sharapova winning two of their first three meetings, including claiming her first major title at the 2004 Wimbledon Championships, upsetting two-time defending champion Williams in the final. However, from then on Williams utterly dominated the rivalry, winning all 19 of their subsequent meetings and only dropping three sets across all of those matches.

The most lopsided match between the two was in the women's singles final at the 2012 London Olympics, where Williams beat Sharapova, 6–0, 6–1 in 62 minutes.

Williams held the world No. 1 position on the WTA rankings for 319 weeks, Sharapova for 21 weeks.

== Head-to-head ==
Legend	Maria Sharapova	Serena Williams
Grand Slam	1	8
WTA Tour Championships	1	1
WTA Tier I / Premier Mandatory / Premier 5	0	8
WTA Tier II / Premier	0	2
Olympics	0	1
Total	2	20

Maria Sharapova–Serena Williams (2–20)

No.	Year	Tournament	Tier	Surface	Round	Winner	Score	Sharapova	S. Williams
1.	2004	Miami Masters	Tier I	Hard	Round of 16	Serena Williams	6–4, 6–3	0	1
2.	2004	Wimbledon	Grand Slam	Grass	Final	Maria Sharapova	6–1, 6–4	1	1
3.	2004	WTA Championships	Tour Finals	Hard	Final	Maria Sharapova	4–6, 6–2, 6–4	2	1
4.	2005	Australian Open	Grand Slam	Hard	Semifinals	Serena Williams	2–6, 7–5, 8–6	2	2
5.	2007	Australian Open	Grand Slam	Hard	Final	Serena Williams	6–1, 6–2	2	3
6.	2007	Miami Masters	Tier I	Hard	Round of 16	Serena Williams	6–1, 6–1	2	4
7.	2008	Charleston Open	Tier I	Clay	Quarterfinals	Serena Williams	7–5, 4–6, 6–1	2	5
8.	2010	Wimbledon	Grand Slam	Grass	Round of 16	Serena Williams	7–6^{(11–9)}, 6–4	2	6
9.	2011	Stanford	Premier	Hard	Quarterfinals	Serena Williams	6–1, 6–3	2	7
10.	2012	Madrid Masters	Premier Mandatory	Clay	Quarterfinals	Serena Williams	6–1, 6–3	2	8
11.	2012	Olympics Tennis	Olympics	Grass	Final	Serena Williams	6–0, 6–1	2	9
12.	2012	WTA Championships	Tour Finals	Hard	Final	Serena Williams	6–4, 6–3	2	10
13.	2013	Doha	Premier 5	Hard	Semifinals	Serena Williams	6–3, 6–2	2	11
14.	2013	Miami Masters	Premier Mandatory	Hard	Final	Serena Williams	4–6, 6–3, 6–0	2	12
15.	2013	Madrid Masters	Premier Mandatory	Clay	Final	Serena Williams	6–1, 6–4	2	13
16.	2013	French Open	Grand Slam	Clay	Final	Serena Williams	6–4, 6–4	2	14
17.	2014	Brisbane	Premier	Hard	Semifinals	Serena Williams	6–2, 7–6^{(9–7)}	2	15
18.	2014	Miami Masters	Premier Mandatory	Hard	Semifinals	Serena Williams	6–4, 6–3	2	16
19.	2015	Australian Open	Grand Slam	Hard	Final	Serena Williams	6–3, 7–6^{(7–5)}	2	17
20.	2015	Wimbledon	Grand Slam	Grass	Semifinals	Serena Williams	6–2, 6–4	2	18
21.	2016	Australian Open	Grand Slam	Hard	Quarterfinals	Serena Williams	6–4, 6–1	2	19
	2018	French Open	Grand Slam	Clay	Round of 16	Maria Sharapova	walkover (Note: Williams withdrew a couple of hours before the match, and it is not counted.)		
22.	2019	US Open	Grand Slam	Hard	Round of 128	Serena Williams	6–1, 6–1	2	20

== Breakdown of the rivalry ==
- Hard courts: Serena Williams, 13–1
- Clay courts: Serena Williams, 4–0
- Grass courts: Serena Williams, 3–1
- Indoor carpet: none
- Grand Slam matches: Serena Williams, 8–1
- Grand Slam finals: Serena Williams, 3–1
- Year-End Championships matches: 1–1
- Year-End Championships finals: 1–1
- Fed Cup matches: none
- All finals: Serena Williams, 7–2

== See also ==
- List of tennis rivalries
