= Gonzales–Laver rivalry =

Tennis rivalry

The Gonzales–Laver rivalry was a tennis rivalry between Pancho Gonzales and Rod Laver, widely regarded as two of the greatest tennis players of all time. They played against each other from 1964 to 1970, and Laver led their head-to-head rivalry 43-22.

== Analysis ==
Jack Kramer writes that Laver was "absolutely unbeatable for a year or two late in the 1960s", but a "careful comparison" could be made between Laver and the somewhat older Gonzales and that Kramer is "positive that Gonzales could have beaten Laver regularly."

Kramer sees as evidence of Gonzales's superiority over Laver the fact that Gonzales defeated Laver in a U.S.$10,000 winner-take-all, five-set match before 15,000 spectators in New York City's Madison Square Garden in January 1970 when Gonzales was age 41 and Laver was still considered the world No. 1 player. However, Gonzales was still a top 10 player when this match occurred, and Laver won this event, beating Gonzales in the semifinals.

== Head-to-head tallies ==
The following is a breakdown of their documented head-to-head results:

Player	1964	1965	1966	1967	1968	1969	1970	Total
(Australia) Rod Laver	5	9	2	9	9	7	2	43
(United States) Pancho Gonzales	7	4	4	2	2	0	3	22

- All matches: Laver 43–22
- All finals: Laver 14–7
- Grand Slams: Laver 1–0
- Pro Slams: Laver 2–0

== List of matches ==
No.	Date	Event	Round	Surface	Winner	Score
1	1964-05-21	College Park Pro Championships, Maryland	quarter-final	Indoor	Laver	6–2, 10–8
2	1964-05-29	U.S. Pro Indoor, White Plains, NY	quarter-final	Indoor	Gonzales	1–6, 6–3, 6–3
3	1964-06-03	Masters Pro, Los Angeles	Round Robin	Hard	Laver	10–4
4	1964-06-08	Masters Pro, Los Angeles	3rd Place	Hard	Gonzales	10–8
5	1964-06-26	Schiltz Pro, Milwaukee	Semifinal	Outdoor	Gonzales	6–4, 6–4
6	1964-07-13	US Pro Championship, Chestnut Hill	Final	Grass	Laver	4–6, 6–3, 7–5, 6–4
7	1964-07-16	Pro Tour, Scarborough	Tour		Gonzales	6–4, 6–2
8	1964-07-21	Golden Racquet, Wembley	Semifinal	Wood (i)	Gonzales	8–5
9	1964-07-23	Knokke Le Zoute Pro	Final	Clay	Gonzales	6–3, 8–6
10	1964-08-15	Cannes Pro	Semifinal	Wood (i)	Gonzales	6–1, 4–6, 7–5
11	1964-08-24	Geneva Pro, Geneva	Final	Clay	Laver	4–6, 6–3, 6–1
12	1964-09-17	Wembley Pro Championship, London	Semifinal	Wood (i)	Laver	6–2, 3–6, 8–6, 6–3
13	1965-01-22	NSW Pro, Sydney	Semifinal	Grass	Gonzales	6–1, 4–6, 6–3
14	1965-01-29	South Australian Pro, Adelaide	Semifinal	Grass	Laver	20–18, 6–4
15	1965-02-06	Western Australian Pro, Perth	Final	Grass	Laver	7–5, 11–9
16	1965-04-20	CBS TV Pro, Dallas	Semifinal	Clay	Gonzales	8–6, 6–3
17	1965-04-25	Oklahoma City Pro, Oklahoma	Final	Hard	Laver	6–3, 6–4
18	1965-05-02	U.S. Pro Indoor, New York	Final	Carpet (i)	Laver	6–3, 6–1
19	1965-05-24	Masters Pro, Los Angeles	Final	Hard	Laver	3–6, 6–3, 7–5
20	1965-05-31	Peacock Gap Pro, San Rafael	Final	Hard	Laver	6–1, 6–4
21	1965-06-06	Seattle Seafirst Greater Pro, Seattle	Final	Hard	Gonzales	6–3, 6–4
22	1965-06-16	Les Stoefen Day, La Jolla	Exhibition	Hard	Laver	1–6, 8–6, 6–4
23	1965-06-20	Tahoe Racquet Club Pro, Lake Tahoe	Final	Hard	Laver	6–3, 2–6, 6–4
24	1965-07-04	Saint Louis Pro	3rd Place	Clay	Laver	10–8
25	1965-11-21	Balboa Bay	Exhibition	Hard	Gonzales	6–4, 4–6, 6–4
26	1966-03-14	International Match, Los Angeles	Round Robin	Carpet (i)	Laver	10–5
27	1966-03-18	International Match, Chicago	Round Robin	Carpet (i)	Gonzales	7–5
28	1966-03-31	London BBC-2 Trophy, Wembley	Final	Wood (i)	Gonzales	6–3, 5–7, 12–10
29	1966-06-12	Forest Hills Pro	Round Robin	Grass	Laver	31–23
30	1966-12-04	Hollywood Pro Challenge Cup	Final	Clay	Gonzales	6–4, 6–2
31	1966-12-11	Orlando Pro	Final	Clay	Gonzales	6–3, 6–0
32	1967-01-31	Australian Tour, Toowoomba	Tour		Laver	4–6, 6–3, 6–4
33	1967-02-06	Australian Tour, Rockhampton	Tour		Laver	6–3, 8–10, 7–5
34	1967-02-08	Australian Tour, Brisbane	Tour		Laver	6–2, 5–7, 9–7
35	1967-02-19	Australian Tour, Melbourne	Tour	Grass	Gonzales	6–2, 6–4
36	1967-02-22	New Zealand Tour, Dunedin	Tour	Indoor	Laver	6–0, 7–9, 13–11
37	1967-02-24	New Zealand Tour, Wanganui	Tour	Indoor	Laver	6–0, 6–3
38	1967-02-26	New Zealand Tour, Auckland	Tour	Grass	Gonzales	8–6, 4–6, 7–5
39	1967-03-05	U.S. Pro Indoor, New York	Final	Carpet (i)	Laver	7–5, 14–16, 7–5, 6–2
40	1967-03-19	Orlando Pro	Final	Clay	Laver	6–4, 2–6, 6–0
41	1967-03-31	Montreal Pro	Semifinal	Carpet (i)	Laver	10–7
42	1967-08-13	Colonial Pro, Fort Worth	Semifinal	Hard	Laver	9–7, 6–3
43	1968-03-20	São Paulo Pro	4-man RR		Laver	7–5, 5–7, 6–4
44	1968-03-24	Buenos Aires Pro	Final	Clay	Laver	6–3, 6–3
45	1968	Bogota Pro	3rd Place		Laver	7–5, 6–8, 7–5
46	1968-04-14	Hollywood Pro Challenge Cup	3rd Place	Clay	Gonzales	10–3
47	1968-04-17	London BBC-2 Trophy	Semifinal	Wood (i)	Laver	12–10
48	1968-04-20	Paris Indoor	3rd place		Laver	6–4, 14–12
49	1968-04-22	Toulouse	Tour		Laver	4–6, 9–7, 7–5
50	1968-06-08	French Open	Semifinal	Clay	Laver	6–3, 6–3, 6–1
51	1968-07-12	French Pro Championship	Semifinal	Clay	Laver	8–6, 6–2, 6–3
52	1968-07-19	Los Angeles NTL Pro	Final	Carpet (i)	Gonzales	1–6, 6–3, 6–4
53	1968-08-12	McAllen, TX	One-Night Stand	Hard (O)	Laver	4–6, 6–1, 6–4
54	1969-02-10	Orlando Pro	Semifinal	Clay	Laver	9–7, 6–2
55	1969-02-27	Portland	One-Night Stand	Carpet (i)	Laver	7–5, 6–8, 8–6
56	1969-02-28	Seattle	One-Night Stand		Laver	6–3, 8–6
57	1969-03-21	Honolulu	One-Night Stand	Carpet (i)	Laver	2–6, 6–3, 6–4
58	1969-03-22	Honolulu	One-Night Stand	Carpet (i)	Laver	4–6, 6–4, 6–4
59	1969-08-10	Binghamton Pro, New York	4-man RR	Clay	Laver	6–1, 6–2
60	1969-08-24	Baltimore, Maryland	Final	Grass	Laver	6–3, 3–6, 7–5, 4–6, 8–6
61	1970-01-23	Tennis Champions Classic, New York	Round Robin	Carpet (i)	Gonzales	7–5, 3–6, 2–6, 6–3, 6–2
62	1970–04-06	Cape Town, South Africa	One-Night Stand		Gonzales	6–4, 6–4
63	1970-05-17	WCT Howard Hughes Tennis Championships, Las Vegas	Final	Hard	Gonzales	6–1, 7–5, 5–7, 6–3
64	1970-06-02	Tennis Champions Classic, New York	Semifinal	Carpet (i)	Laver	6–3, 6–3, 6–1
65	1970-10-01	WCT Vancouver	quarter-final	Carpet (i)	Laver	6–3, 7–5

== See also ==
- List of tennis rivalries
