= Borotra–Cochet rivalry =

Tennis rivalry

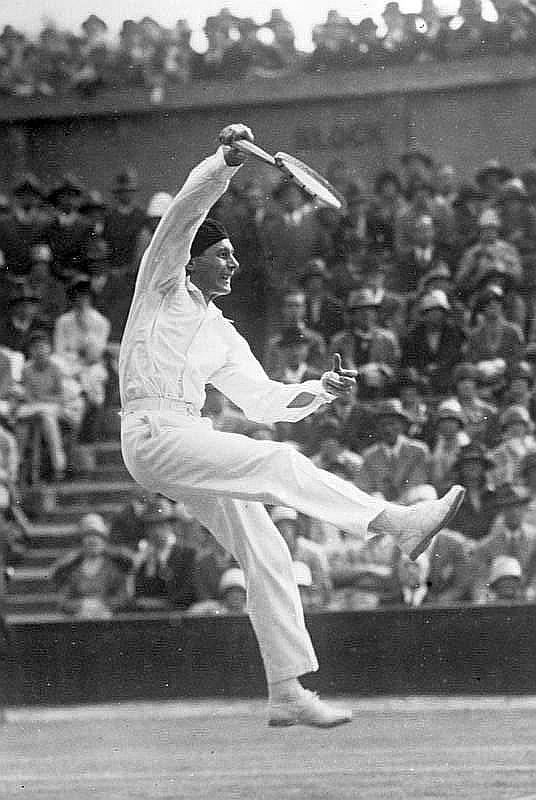
Jean Borotra (4 Major singles, 9 Major doubles, 5 Major Mixed Doubles, 1 Olympic Bronze, singles, World No.2 )

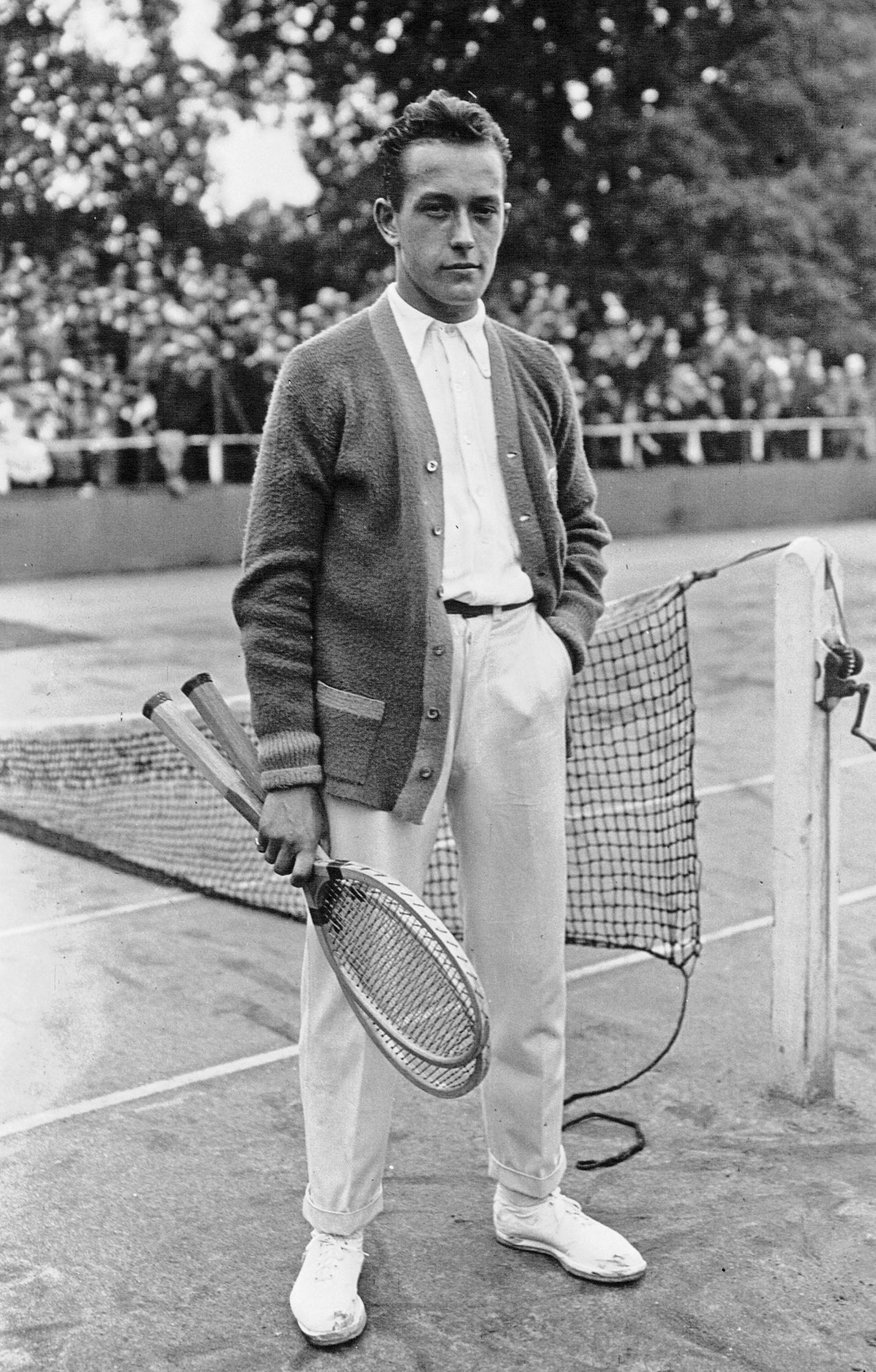
Henri Cochet (11 Major singles, 8 Major doubles, 4 Major mixed doubles, 2 Olympic Silvers singles and doubles, World No.1)

This was a tennis rivalry played between French player Jean Borotra and the French player Henri Cochet, which in their respective careers the met 16 times from 1922 until 1949.

Jean Borotra a former World Number 2 and four time Grand Slam singles champion and Henri Cochet a former World number 1 and seven time Grand Slam champion, three time ITF Major champion and one time Pro Slam champion and both Davis Cup champions.

== Summary ==
They first met in each other in the final of the World Covered Court Championships at Palace Lawn Tennis Club, in St. Moritz in 1922 with Cochet winning there inugrial meeting. Their final meeting was at the Pierre Gillou Cup In Paris in the semi-finals in 1949 that time Borotra was the winner. They played each other on multiple surfaces including grass courts, clay courts, hard courts and wood courts and in different environments both outdoors and indoors.

== Head-to-head ==
=== Official matches (Borotra 8–8 Cochet) ===
Legend (Borotra-Cochet)
Grand Slams (3–3)
ILTF Major (0–1)

| No | Tournament | Year | Round | Surface | Winner | Score |
|---|---|---|---|---|---|---|
| 1 | World Covered Court Championships | 1922 | Final | Hard | Henri Cochet | 4–6 2–6 6–2 6–3 6–0 |
| 2 | France Interclubs Championships | 1922 | Round Robin | Clay | Henri Cochet | 6–3 0–6 6–3 |
| 3 | French National Championships | 1922 | Final | Clay | Henri Cochet | 6–3 7–5 6–2 |
| 4 | Coupe de Noël | 1923 | Semifinal | Hard | Jean Borotra | 2–6 6–3 6–2 |
| 5 | French Covered Court Championships | 1924 | Final | Hard/Wood (i) | Jean Borotra | 6–2 9–7 5–7 6–4 |
| 6 | Olympic Games | 1924 | Semifinal | Clay | Henri Cochet | 6–2 5–7 6–2 6–3 |
| 7 | Wimbledon Championships | 1925 | Semifinal | Grass | Jean Borotra | 5–7 8–6 6–4 6–1 |
| 8 | Wimbledon Championships | 1926 | Final | Grass | Jean Borotra | 2–6 7–5 2–6 6–3 7–5 |
| 9 | Wimbledon Championships | 1927 | Final | Grass | Henri Cochet | 4–6 4–6 6–3 6–4 7–5 |
| 10 | French Championships | 1928 | Semifinal | Clay | Henri Cochet | 6–3 2–6 7–5 6–4 |
| 11 | Coupe de Noel | 1928 | Final | Hard | Henri Cochet | 6–3 6–4 6–3 |
| 12 | Belgian International Covered Courts | 1929 | Final | Hard | Jean Borotra | 7–5 6–4 3–6 6–3 |
| 13 | French Championships | 1929 | Semifinal | Clay | Jean Borotra | 6–3 5–7 7–5 5–7 6–4 |
| 14 | Wimbledon Championships | 1929 | Final | Grass | Henri Cochet | 6–4 6–3 6–4 |
| 15 | Belgian International Championships | 1930 | Final | Clay | Jean Borotra | 4–6 6–3 6–4 4–6 8–6 |
| 16 | Pierre Gillou Cup | 1949 | Semifinal | Hard | Jean Borotra | 6–1 2–6 6–4 |

== Breakdown of their rivalry ==
- All matches: Tied, 8–8
- All finals: Cochet, 5–3
- Grand Slam matches: Tied, 3–3
- Grand Slam finals: Tied, 3–3
- Clay courts: Cochet, 4–2
- Grass courts: Tied, 2–2
- Hard courts: Borotra, 4–2
- Outdoor courts: Cochet, 7-6
- Indoor courts: Borotra, 2–1

== See also ==
- List of tennis rivalries

== Sources ==
- "Jean Borotra -Henri Cochet-Matches Head 2 Head". thetennisbase.com.
