= Gonzales–Rosewall rivalry =

Tennis rivalry

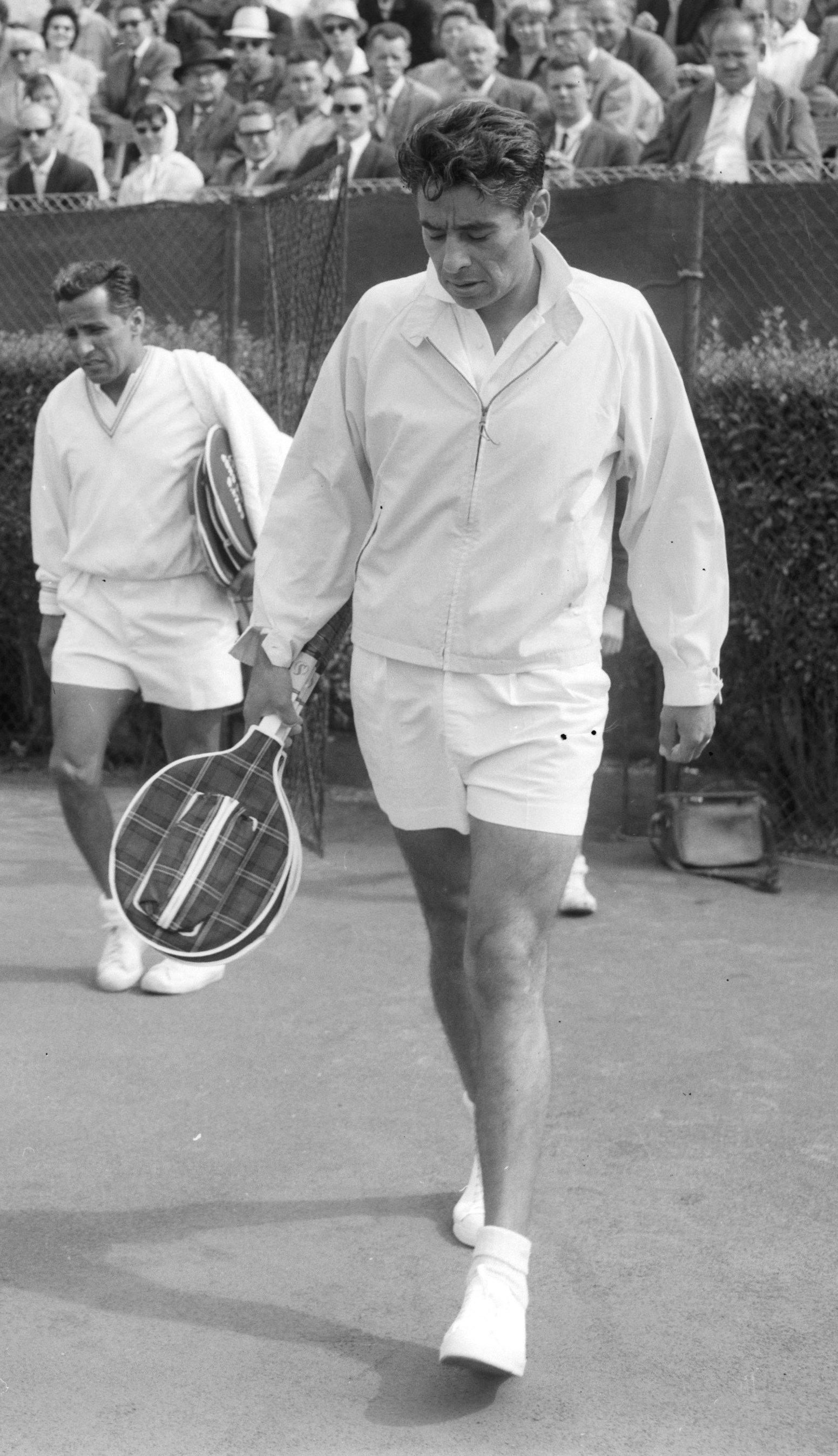
Pancho Gonzales seen left with Pancho Segura, (14 Major singles, 2 Major doubles, World No.1 )

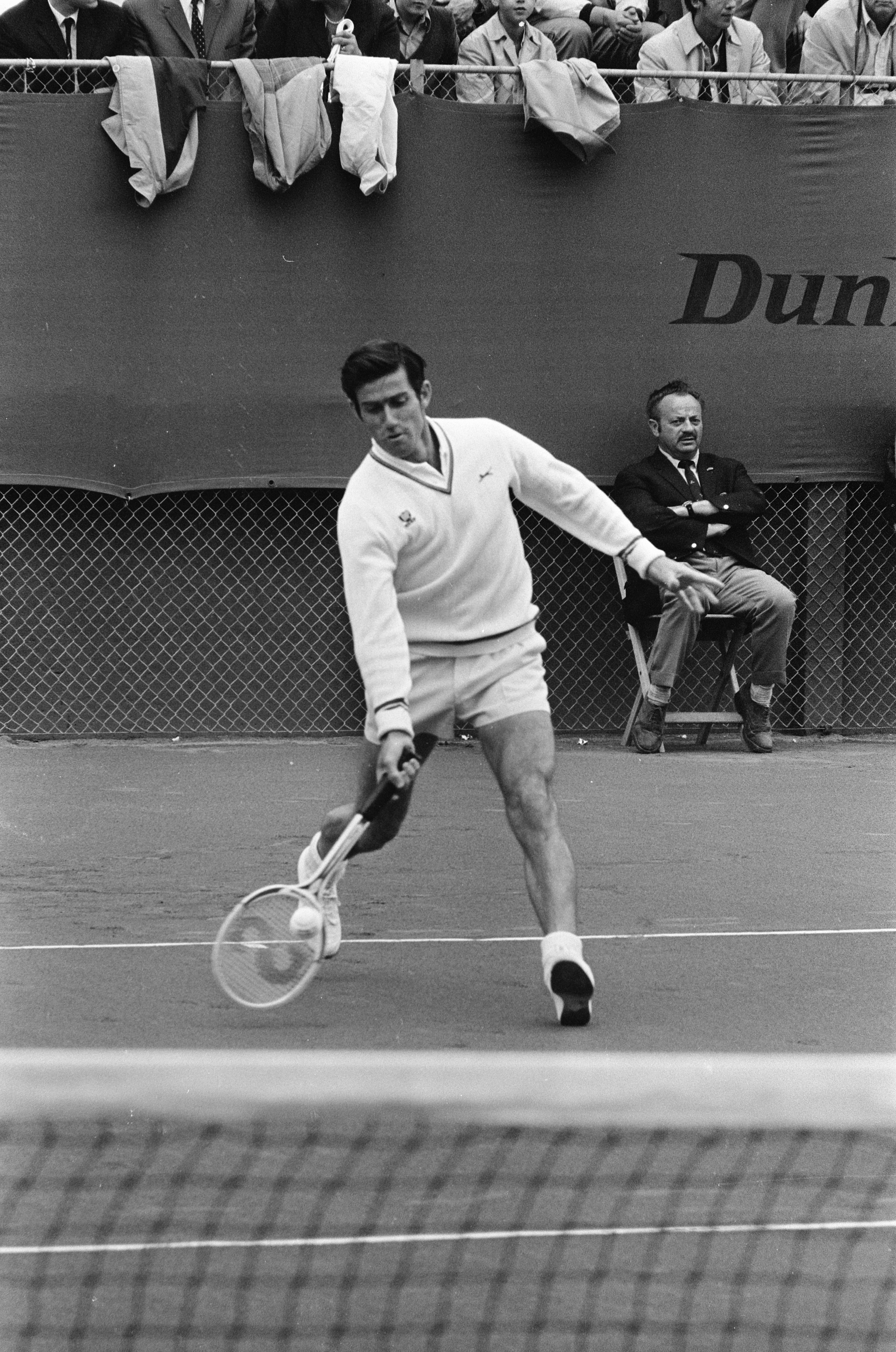
Ken Rosewall (23 Major singles, 9 Major doubles, 2 Tour finals, World No.1)

The Gonzales–Rosewall rivalry was a tennis rivalry between Pancho Gonzales and Ken Rosewall, widely regarded as two of the greatest tennis players of all time. This rivalry featured some of the most acclaimed matches in tennis history, and was the most prolific tennis rivalry of all time.

Gonzales is still considered to be a candidate for the greatest tennis player of all time; he was the dominant player of the 1950s and jointly holds the men's all-time record of being ranked world No. 1 for eight years (with Novak Djokovic). Rosewall succeeded Gonzales as the world's best player in 1961 and held that position either by himself or sharing it with others for six years. Rosewall was signed in 1956 by the promoter Jack Kramer, a former world No. 1 player himself, to join his small band of touring professionals in 1957. He then engaged in a round-the-world, head-to-head tour against Gonzales, the defending world champion, over the next five months, winning 26 matches but losing 50. In his 1979 autobiography Kramer included both Gonzales and Rosewall in his list of the 21 greatest players of all time. Kramer, however, initially "panicked" upon signing Rosewall.

He was a cute little fellow with a dink serve, who operated mostly from the baseline. That great volley of his hadn't been developed yet. I was afraid that Gorgo [Gonzales] would eat him alive and put us out of business the rest of the way. But like a lot of people I completely underestimated Rosewall.

Before their opening match in Melbourne, Kramer went to Gonzales and asked him to "carry" Rosewall, giving him a better share of the gate to gain his assent. Gonzales did try to carry out his part of the deal for a few matches, but then called it off, telling Kramer that he was no longer able to play his normal game. Kramer agreed. "It was... obvious that Rosewall was not the pushover I had feared. (In fact, Gonzales only beat him 50–26, and it was always competitive.)" Thirteen years later, in 1970, Gonzales defeated Rosewall, who was six years his junior, 6–4, 6–4, in the penultimate match they ever played—Gonzales was 42 years old at the time and Rosewall was considered to be the co-No. 1 player in the world.

In 1961 Gonzales named Rosewall as the toughest opponent he had faced, rating him above Jack Kramer, Lew Hoad, Pancho Segura, Ted Schroeder, Frank Sedgman and Frank Parker. Gonzales added:

“Even with my tremendous service advantage I can only just edge him out on grass or wood. On clay courts, where my service advantage is neutralised, he has the advantage over me.” Pancho said admiringly: “If he had my service no one would touch him.”

== Head-to-head tally ==
The following is a breakdown of their documented head-to-head results:

Player	1957	1958	1959	1960	1961	1962	1963	1964	1965	1966	1967	1968	1969	1970	Total
(United States) Pancho Gonzales	51	14	5	20	4	0	0	4	7	2	2	4	3	1	117
(Australia) Ken Rosewall	27	3	6	5	7	0	0	14	3	5	2	8	4	2	87

- All matches: Gonzales 117-87
- World Pro Tours (1957, 1960): Gonzales 70-30
- All finals: Rosewall 8–7
- Pro Slams: Rosewall 3–2
- Grand Slams: 0–0
- By surfaces played on, both indoors and outdoors:
  - Clay: Rosewall 16–11; Gonzales won the first five, Rosewall 16 of the last 21
  - Grass: Gonzales 24–14
  - Canvas: Gonzales 52–26
  - Carpet: Rosewall 7–4; none played before US Pro Indoor in mid-1965
  - Hard (including concrete but not canvas or carpet): Gonzales 11–8
  - Wood: Gonzales 14–13
  - Unknown: Gonzales 1-2

== List of all matches ==
No.	Date	Event	Round	Surface	Winner	"Score
1	1957-01-14	World Pro Tour, Melbourne	Pro	Grass	(United States) Gonzales	6–3, 3–6, 6–3, 1–6, 9–7
2	1957-01-15	World Pro Tour, Melbourne	Pro	Grass	(Australia) Rosewall	7–5, 6–4, 14–12
3	1957-01-18	World Pro Tour, Sydney	Pro	Grass	(United States) Gonzales	6–2, 6–4, 6–0
4	1957-01-20	World Pro Tour, Sydney	Pro	Grass	(United States) Gonzales	9–7, 7–5, 9–7
5	1957-01-21	World Pro Tour, Brisbane	Pro	Grass	(United States) Gonzales	3–6, 6–3, 11–9, 1–6, 15–13
6	1957-01-22	World Pro Tour, Brisbane	Pro	Grass	(United States) Gonzales	6–4, 9–7, 6–2
7	1957-01-26	World Pro Tour, Wellington	Pro	Grass	(United States) Gonzales	4–6, 6–2, 6–2, 6–4
8	1957-01-27	World Pro Tour, Auckland	Pro	Grass	(United States) Gonzales	16–14, 6–4, 9–7
9	1957-01-30	World Pro Tour, Christchurch	Pro	Grass	(Australia) Rosewall	2–6, 8–10, 6–3, 6–3, 9–7
10	1957-02-04	World Pro Tour, Adelaide	Pro	Grass	(Australia) Rosewall	4–6, 3–6, 6–3, 9–7, 6–1
11	1957-02-10	World Pro Tour, NSW Pro Champs	3rd Place	Grass	(Australia) Rosewall	6–1, 6–4, 6–2
12	1957-02-17	World Pro Tour, New York	Pro	Canvas (i)	(United States) Gonzales	6–2, 6–4, 6–2
13	1957-02-18	World Pro Tour, Dallas	Pro	Canvas (i)	(United States) Gonzales	8–6, 5–7, 6–4
14	1957-02-20	World Pro Tour, San Francisco	Pro	Canvas (i)	(Australia) Rosewall	6–3, 6–8, 18–16
15	1957-02-22	World Pro Tour, Hollywood CA	Pro	Canvas (i)	(Australia) Rosewall	6–4, 6–3
16	1957-02-23	World Pro Tour, Los Angeles	Pro	Canvas (i)	(United States) Gonzales	6–4, 8–6
17	1957-02-24	World Pro Tour, Phoenix	Pro	Hard	(United States) Gonzales	10–8, 6–2
18	1957-02-25	World Pro Tour, Albuquerque	Pro	Canvas (i)	(Australia) Rosewall	6–3, 16–14
19	1957-02-26	World Pro Tour, Lubbock TX	Pro	Canvas (i)	(United States) Gonzales	6–2, 6–4
20	1957-02-27	World Pro Tour, Odessa	Pro	Canvas (i)	(United States) Gonzales	1–6, 6–4, 6–4
21	1957-02-28	World Pro Tour, Fort Worth	Pro	Canvas (i)	(United States) Gonzales	6–3, 6–2
22	1957-03-02	World Pro Tour, Corpus Christi	Pro	Canvas (i)	(United States) Gonzales	4–6, 6–2, 6–4
23	1957-03-04	World Pro Tour, Houston	Pro	Clay	(United States) Gonzales	6–1, 2–6, 6–2
24	1957-03-05	World Pro Tour, Kansas City	Pro	Canvas (i)	(United States) Gonzales	6–3, 3–6, 6–3
25	1957-03-07	World Pro Tour, St Louis	Pro	Canvas (i)	(United States) Gonzales	6–4, 6–0
26	1957-03-08	World Pro Tour, Chicago	Pro	Canvas (i)	(Australia) Rosewall	2–6, 6–3, 10–8
27	1957-03-09	World Pro Tour, Chicago	Pro	Canvas (i)	(United States) Gonzales	6–4, 9–7
28	1957-03-11	World Pro Tour, Providence	Pro	Canvas (i)	(United States) Gonzales	11–9, 2–6, 6–2
29	1957-03-12	World Pro Tour, Boston	Pro	Canvas (i)	(United States) Gonzales	6–2, 5–7, 24–22
30	1957-03-13	World Pro Tour, Philadelphia	Pro	Canvas (i)	(United States) Gonzales	6–2, 1–6, 6–3
31	1957-03-14	World Pro Tour, Washington	Pro	Canvas (i)	(United States) Gonzales	8–6, 6–1
32	1957-03-15	World Pro Tour, Washington	Pro	Canvas (i)	(Australia) Rosewall	10–8, 8–6
33	1957-03-17	World Pro Tour, Richmond VA	Pro	Canvas (i)	(United States) Gonzales	6–3, 3–6, 15–13
34	1957-03-18	World Pro Tour, Lynchburg VA	Pro	Canvas (i)	(Australia) Rosewall	8–6, 6–3
35	1957-03-20	World Pro Tour, Muncie IND	Pro	Canvas (i)	(United States) Gonzales	6–8, 6–4, 6–4
36	1957-03-21	World Pro Tour, Evansville IND	Pro	Canvas (i)	(United States) Gonzales	3–6, 6–1, 6–4
37	1957-03-23	World Pro Tour, Louisville KY	Pro	Canvas (i)	(United States) Gonzales	6–3, 7–5
38	1957-03-26	World Pro Tour, Ann Arbor MI	Pro	Canvas (i)	(Australia) Rosewall	1–6, 6–2, 6–3
39	1957-03-29	World Pro Tour, Montreal	Pro	Canvas (i)	(United States) Gonzales	6–1, 7–5
40	1957-03-31	World Pro Tour, Sherbrooke Quebec	Pro	Canvas (i)	(Australia) Rosewall	6–4, 6–1
41	1957-04-01	World Pro Tour, Toronto	Pro	Canvas (i)	(United States) Gonzales	22–20, 6–4
42	1957-04-02	World Pro Tour, Ottawa	Pro	Canvas (i)	(Australia) Rosewall	1–6, 6–2, 8–6
43	1957-04-03	World Pro Tour, Quebec City	Pro	Canvas (i)	(Australia) Rosewall	10–8, 6–2
44	1957-04-05	World Pro Tour, Clinton NY	Pro	Canvas (i)	(United States) Gonzales	6–3, 6–4
45	1957-04-06	World Pro Tour, East Orange NJ	Pro	Canvas (i)	(United States) Gonzales	6–4, 9–7
46	1957-04-07	World Pro Tour, Troy NY	Pro	Canvas (i)	(United States) Gonzales	6–8, 6–2, 6–4
47	1957-04-08	World Pro Tour, Rochester NY	Pro	Canvas (i)	(Australia) Rosewall	2–6, 9–7, 6–2
48	1957-04-13	World Pro Tour, Detroit	Pro	Canvas (i)	(United States) Gonzales	6–4, 2–6, 6–4
49	1957-04-14	World Pro Tour, Toledo	Pro	Canvas (i)	(United States) Gonzales	9–7, 6–8, 6–4
50	1957-04-15	World Pro Tour, Kalamazoo	Pro	Canvas (i)	(Australia) Rosewall	9–7, 6–4
51	1957-04-16	World Pro Tour, Midland MI	Pro	Canvas (i)	(United States) Gonzales	7–5, 9–7
52	1957-04-18	World Pro Tour, New Haven	Pro	Canvas (i)	(United States) Gonzales	6–4, 9–7
53	1957-04-20	World Pro Tour, Hamilton Pro	Semifinal	Clay	(United States) Gonzales	6–1, 3–6, 6–4
54	1957-04-23	World Pro Tour, Princeton	Pro	Canvas (i)	(Australia) Rosewall	6–1, 6–3
55	1957-04-24	World Pro Tour, White Plains	Pro	Canvas (i)	(Australia) Rosewall	6–3, 6–4
56	1957-04-26	World Pro Tour, Charlottesville	Pro	Canvas (i)	(Australia) Rosewall	10–8, 23–21
57	1957-04-27	World Pro Tour, Charlotte	Pro	Canvas (i)	(United States) Gonzales	6–8, 6–3, 6–4
58	1957-04-28	World Pro Tour, Atlanta GA	Pro	Canvas (i)	(Australia) Rosewall	2–6, 6–3, 9–7
59	1957-04-29	World Pro Tour, Norfolk VA	Pro	Canvas (i)	(United States) Gonzales	6–4, 6–4
60	1957-04-30	World Pro Tour, Raleigh NC	Pro	Canvas (i)	(United States) Gonzales	6–4, 1–6, 6–3
61	1957-05-01	World Pro Tour, Roanoke VA	Pro	Canvas (i)	(United States) Gonzales	6–4, 6–4
62	1957-05-02	World Pro Tour, Parkesburg	Pro	Canvas (i)	(United States) Gonzales	6–4, 6–0
63	1957-05-03	World Pro Tour, Cincinnati	Pro	Canvas (i)	(United States) Gonzales	6–3, 6–4
64	1957-05-04	World Pro Tour, South Bend IND	Pro	Canvas (i)	(Australia) Rosewall	3–6, 8–6, 6–4
65	1957-05-05	World Pro Tour, Lansing MI	Pro	Canvas (i)	(Australia) Rosewall	6–4, 8–10, 11–9
66	1957-05-07	World Pro Tour, Milwaukee	Pro	Canvas (i)	(United States) Gonzales	9–7, 6–4
67	1957-05-09	World Pro Tour, Madison	Pro	Canvas (i)	(Australia) Rosewall	7–5, 6–1
68	1957-05-10	World Pro Tour, Minneapolis	Pro	Canvas (i)	(United States) Gonzales	6–1, 6–3
69	1957-05-11	World Pro Tour, Huron SD	Pro	Canvas (i)	(Australia) Rosewall	6–3, 6–4
70	1957-05-13	World Pro Tour, Winnipeg CDA	Pro	Canvas (i)	(Australia) Rosewall	2–6, 6–3, 6–4
71	1957-05-16	World Pro Tour, Denver	Pro	Canvas (i)	(Australia) Rosewall	6–3, 6–2
72	1957-05-19	World Pro Tour, Salt Lake City	Pro	Canvas (i)	(United States) Gonzales	6–4, 6–4
73	1957-05-21	World Pro Tour, Boise ID	Pro	Canvas (i)	(United States) Gonzales	6–4, 6–2
74	1957-05-25	World Pro Tour, Oxnard CA	Pro	Canvas (i)	(United States) Gonzales	6–2, 6–4
75	1957-05-26	World Pro Tour, LA Jolla	Pro	Hard	(United States) Gonzales	1–6, 6–3, 6–1
76	1957-05-27	World Pro Tour, Bakersfield	Pro	Hard	(United States) Gonzales	6–2, 6–8, 6–3
77	1957-07-16	Forest Hills Pro	Round Robin	Grass	(United States) Gonzales	6–2, 8–6, 6–4
78	1957-07-30	Masters RR	Round Robin	Hard	(Australia) Rosewall	22–20, 1–6, 6–2
79	1958-01-28	Melbourne Pro	Round Robin	Grass	(United States) Gonzales	10–8, 6–3
80	1958-05-25	Salt Lake City	Final	Hard	(United States) Gonzales	10–8
81	1958-05-26	Boise	Final	Canvas (i)	(United States) Gonzales	8–4
82	1958-05-27	Spokane	Semifinal	Canvas (i)	(United States) Gonzales	8–2
83	1958-06-03	Palo Alto	Semifinal	Hard	(United States) Gonzales	9–7
84	1958-06-24	Forest Hills Pro	Round Robin	Grass	(United States) Gonzales	19–17, 5–7, 6–4
85	1958-07-01	Masters RR, Los Angeles	Round Robin	Hard	(United States) Gonzales	10–8, 0–6, 12–10
86	1958-09-27	London Pro	3rd Place	Wood (i)	(United States) Gonzales	10–8, 0–6, 7–5
87	1958-09-29	Roubaix French Tour	Pro	Wood (i)*	(United States) Gonzales	6–3, 7–5
88	1958-10-02	Copenhagen Pro	Final	Wood (i)*	(Australia) Rosewall	6–4, 3–6, 19–17
89	1958-10-16	Linkoping Euro Tour	Pro	Wood (i)*	(United States) Gonzales	6–4, 13–12
90	1958-10-17	Helsingborg Euro Tour	Pro	Wood (i)*	(United States) Gonzales	8–6, 12–10
91	1958-10-19	Berlin Euro Tour	Pro	Wood (i)*	(United States) Gonzales	6–4, 6–4
92	1958-10-22	Vienna Euro Tour	Pro	Wood (i)*	(Australia) Rosewall	6–2, 9–11, 6–3
93	1958-10-24	Rome Pro	Final	Wood (i)	(United States) Gonzales	6–2, 6–2
94	1958-10-25	Grenoble French Tour	Pro	Wood (i)*	(United States) Gonzales	6–4, 7-5
95	1958-10-30	Barcelona Pro	3rd place	Hard (i)	(Australia) Rosewall	6–3, 0–6, 6–2
96	1959-01-02	Cairns	Pro		(Australia) Rosewall	6–4, 3–6, 6–1
97	1959-01-03	Townsville	Pro		(Australia) Rosewall	6–3, 3–6, 8–6
98	1959-01-04	MacKay	Pro	Grass	(Australia) Rosewall	4–6, 6–2, 6–2
99	1959-01-05	Rockhampton	Pro	Clay	(United States) Gonzales	6–3, 6–3
100	1959-01-23	Queensland Champs	Semifinal	Wood (O)	(Australia) Rosewall	6–3, 13–11, 6–3
101	1959-01-25	Toowoomba	Pro	Grass	(United States) Gonzales	2–6, 8–6, 9–7
102	1959–02-10	Sandy Bay	Pro	Grass	(United States) Gonzales	6–3, 3–6, 10–8
103	1959-06-11	Masters RR	Round Robin	Hard	(Australia) Rosewall	4–6, 6–3, 6–2
104	1959-12-10	NSW Pro Champs	Semifinal	Grass	(United States) Gonzales	7–5, 6–2, 10–8
105	1959-12-20	Sydney	Pro	Grass	(United States) Gonzales	6–2, 6–4
106	1959-12-21	Brisbane Pro Champs	Final	Grass	(Australia) Rosewall	1–6, 7–5, 8–6, 8–6
107	1960-01-28	World Pro Tour, San Francisco	Pro	Canvas (i)	(United States) Gonzales	6–4, 6–4
108	1960-01-30	World Pro Tour, Los Angeles	Pro	Canvas (i)	(United States) Gonzales	6–4, 6–4
109	1960-02-03	World Pro Tour, Philadelphia	Pro	Canvas (i)	(United States) Gonzales	6–4, 4–6, 6–4
110	1960-02-06	World Pro Tour, East Orange NJ	Pro	Canvas (i)	(United States) Gonzales	6–4, 6–4
111	1960-02-10	World Pro Tour, Princeton NJ	Pro	Canvas (i)	(United States) Gonzales	6–3, 6–3
112	1960-02-12	World Pro Tour, Washington DC	Pro	Canvas (i)	(United States) Gonzales	8–10, 6–3, 6–4
113	1960-02-14	World Pro Tour, White Plains NY	Pro	Canvas (i)	(United States) Gonzales	11–9, 6–1
114	1960-02-17	World Pro Tour, Montreal	Pro	Canvas (i)	(United States) Gonzales	7–5, 12–10
115	1960-02-21	World Pro Tour, Seattle	Pro	Canvas (i)	(United States) Gonzales	6–1, 6–1
116	1960-02-27	World Pro Tour, Dallas	Pro	Canvas (i)	(United States) Gonzales	1–6, 7–5, 6–3
117	1960-02-29	World Pro Tour, Oklahoma City	Pro	Canvas (i)	(United States) Gonzales	6–8, 6–3, 6–4
118	1960-03-13	World Pro Tour, Palm Beach	Pro	Clay	(United States) Gonzales	10–8
119	1960-03-14	World Pro Tour, Columbus, GA	Pro	Canvas (i)	(Australia) Rosewall	7–5, 5–7, 10–8
120	1960-03-15	World Pro Tour, Greensboro	Pro	Canvas (i)	(Australia) Rosewall	6–1, 6–4
121	1960-03-16	World Pro Tour, Richmond	Pro	Canvas (i)	(Australia) Rosewall	6–3, 10–8
122	1960-03-23	World Pro Tour, Atlanta	Pro	Canvas (i)	(United States) Gonzales	6–2, 8–10, 6–4
123	1960-03-27	World Pro Tour, Brighton	Pro	Wood (i)	(Australia) Rosewall	7–5, 4–6, 12–10
124	1960-04-03	World Pro Tour, Paris	Pro	Wood (i)	(United States) Gonzales	6–1, 6–4
125	1960-04-16	World Pro Tour, Melbourne	Pro	Grass	(United States) Gonzales	6–4, 6–4
126	1960-04-19	World Pro Tour, Cairns	Pro	Clay	(United States) Gonzales	7-5, 6-2
127	1960-04-20	World Pro Tour, Townsville	Pro	Clay	(United States) Gonzales	3–6, 6–1, 10–8
128	1960-04-23	Australia tour, Canberra	Pro	Grass	(Australia) Rosewall	8–6, 4–6, 6–1
129	1960-04-28	World Pro Tour, Brisbane	Pro	Grass	(United States) Gonzales	3–6, 6–3, 9–7
130	1960-04-29	World Pro Tour, Adelaide	Pro	Grass	(United States) Gonzales	6–2, 5–7, 10–8
131	1960-05-01	World Pro Tour, Sydney	Pro	Grass	(United States) Gonzales	6–3, 9–7
132	1961	St. Jean-de-Luz Euro Tour	Pro	Wood (i)	(United States) Gonzales	6–4, 6–4
133	1961	Arcachon Euro Tour	Pro	Clay	(Australia) Rosewall	6–4, 6–2
134	1961	Royan Euro Tour	Pro	Clay	(Australia) Rosewall	3-6, 9-7, 6-0
135	1961-08-12	La Baule Euro Tour	Pro	Clay	(United States) Gonzales	6–4, 7–5
136	1961-08-13	Dieppe Euro Tour	Pro	Clay	(Australia) Rosewall	6–3, 6–2
137	1961	Le Touquet Euro Tour	Pro	Clay	(Australia) Rosewall	6–3, 6–0
138	1961-08-20	Geneva Gold Trophy	Final	Clay	(United States) Gonzales	8–6, 6–0
139	1961-09-17	French Pro Champs	Final	Clay	(Australia) Rosewall	2–6, 6–4, 6–3, 8–6
140	1961-09-24	Brighton Euro Tour	Pro	Wood (i)	(Australia) Rosewall	3-6, 6–4, 6–2
141	1961-10-23	Padova	Pro	Wood (i)	(Australia) Rosewall	4–6, 7–5, 7–5
142	1961-10-25	Pro Challenge, Turin Team	Pro	Clay (i)	(United States) Gonzales	8–6, 4–6, 6–3
143	1964-05-31	US Pro Indoor, White Plains	Final	Wood (i)	(United States) Gonzales	5–7, 3–6, 10–8, 11–9, 8–6
144	1964	Masters RR	Semifinal	Hard	(Australia) Rosewall	4–6, 6–2, 6–4
145	1964-06-14	Volkswagen Pro, St Louis	Final	Clay	(Australia) Rosewall	6–4, 6–3
146	1964-06-28	Schlitz Pro, Milwaukee	Final	Canvas (i)	(Australia) Rosewall	6–4, 3–6, 6–2
147	1964-07-15	Edinburgh	Pro	Clay	(Australia) Rosewall	6–4, 6–4
148	1964-07-18	Worcester	Pro	Grass	(Australia) Rosewall	Score unknown
149	1964-07-24	Altrincham	Pro	Wood (i)	(United States) Gonzales	6–3, 6–2
150	1964-07-26	Dublin	Pro	Grass	(United States) Gonzales	6–4, 6–4
151	1964	Trofeo Facis Series, Terni	Pro	Clay	(Australia) Rosewall	8–6, 1–6, 6–4
152	1964	Trofeo Facis Series, L'Aquila	Pro	Clay	(Australia) Rosewall	6–1, 2–6, 6–4
153	1964	Trofeo Facis Series, Reggio Calabria	Pro	Clay	(Australia) Rosewall	6–2, 6–1
154	1964-08-03	Taormina Pro	Final	Clay	(Australia) Rosewall	6–3, 2–6, 6–3
155	1964	Trofeo Facis Series, Palermo	Pro	Clay	(Australia) Rosewall	5–7, 6–4, 6–0
156	1964	Trofeo Facis Series, Riccione	Pro	Clay	(Australia) Rosewall	6–3, 6–2
157	1964	Trofeo Facis Series, Lesa	Pro	Clay	(Australia) Rosewall	6–1, 6–1
158	1964-08-16	Cannes Pro Champs	Final	Wood (i)	(Australia) Rosewall	6–3, 3–6, 14–12, 6–4
159	1964	Geneva Pro Champs	Semifinal	Clay	(United States) Gonzales	10–8, 5–7, 6–2
160	1964	French Pro Champs	Semifinal	Wood (i)	(Australia) Rosewall	4–6, 6–2, 5–7, 7–5, 6–2
161	1965	Queensland Champs	Semifinal	Grass	(Australia) Rosewall	6–1, 6–4
162	1965-01-23	NSW Pro Champs	Final	Grass	(United States) Gonzales	8–6, 3–6, 6–4
163	1965	Western Australian Pro	Semifinal	Grass	(United States) Gonzales	6–3, 6–4
164	1965-04-21	CBS TV Pro, Dallas	Final	Clay	(United States) Gonzales	8–10, 7–5, 12–10
165	1965-04-24	Oklahoma City Pro Champs	Round 1		(United States) Gonzales	6–2, 7–5
166	1965-05-01	US Pro Indoor, New York	Semifinal	Carpet (i)	(United States) Gonzales	6–4, 6–2
167	1965-05-21	Los Angeles Masters RR	Round Robin	Hard	(United States) Gonzales	10–3
168	1965-05-30	San Rafael Pro	Semifinal	Hard	(United States) Gonzales	8–10, 6–4, 6–2
169	1965–06	Greater Washington Pro, Reston	Semifinal	Clay	(Australia) Rosewall	6–3, 6–4
170	1965–07	US Pro Champs, Longwood	Semifinal	Grass	(Australia) Rosewall	6–3, 6–2, 6–4
171	1966-03-16	International Team Pro, LA, Australia Team	Pro	Carpet (i)	(United States) Gonzales	10–6
172	1966-03-18	International Team Pro, Chicago, Australia Team	Pro	Carpet (i)	(Australia) Rosewall	7–5
173	1966-03-20	International Team Pro, Detroit, Australia Team	Pro	Carpet (i)	(Australia) Rosewall	10–4
174	1966-03-25	Madison Square Garden Pro	Semifinal	Carpet (i)	(Australia) Rosewall	7–5, 7–5
175	1966	BBC2 Pro, Wembley	Round 1	Wood (i)	(United States) Gonzales	13–11
176	1966	Forest Hills Pro	Round Robin	Grass	(Australia) Rosewall	31–21
177	1966	Forest Hills Pro	Playoff	Grass	(Australia) Rosewall	31–20
178	1967	Australian Pro Tour, Sydney	Pro	Grass	(United States) Gonzales	3–6, 6–4, 6–4
179	1967	Australian Pro Tour, Adelaide	Pro	Grass	(Australia) Rosewall	6–4, 8–6
180	1967	Australian Pro Tour, Shepparton	Pro	Grass	(United States) Gonzales	6–4, 4–6, 6–4
181	1967	BBC2 Pro, Wembley	Round 1	Wood (i)	(Australia) Rosewall	10–7
182	1968-04-13	Burger King Pro, Hollywood	Semifinal	Clay	(Australia) Rosewall	4–6, 6–3, 6–3
183	1968-04-19	Paris Pro Champs	Semifinal	Wood (i)	(Australia) Rosewall	6–4, 8–6
184	1968-04-21	Bordeaux	Semifinal	Wood (i)	(Australia) Rosewall	6–4, 2–6, 6–3
185	1968-05-06	Wembley Invitational	Semifinal	Wood (i)	(Australia) Rosewall	7–5, 6–3, 6–3
186	1968-07-19	Los Angeles NTL Champs	Round 1	Carpet (i)	(United States) Gonzales	8–6, 1–6, 7–5
187	1968-09-19	Pacific SW	Quarterfinal	Hard (i)	(Australia) Rosewall	11–9, 6–2
188	1968-11-06	Marseille One Night Stand	Pro	Wood (i)*	(United States) Gonzales	6–2, 6–4
189	1968-11-07	Lyon One Night Stand	Pro	Wood (i)*	(Australia) Rosewall	4–6, 6–4, 6–3
190	1968-11-11	Metz One Night Stand	Pro	Wood (i)*	(United States) Gonzales	6–3, 6–4
191	1968	Madison Square Garden Pro	Round 1	Carpet (i)	(United States) Gonzales	7–5, 5–7, 6–4
192	1968	Australia versus USA, Evanston Team	Pro	Carpet (i)	(Australia) Rosewall	9–7, 3–6, 6–3
193	1968	Dixie Classic, Nashville	Semifinal	Carpet (i)	(Australia) Rosewall	3–6, 6–1, 6–4
194	1969	Oakland Pro Champs	Quarterfinal	Carpet (i)	(Australia) Rosewall	4–6, 6–3, 11–9
195	1969	US Pro Champs	Quarterfinal	Hard	(Australia) Rosewall	7–9, 9–7, 6–2
196	1969	Baltimore RR	Round Robin	Grass	(United States) Gonzales	6–4, 6–4, 7–5
197	1969	Incline Valley, NV	Semifinal	Hard	(Australia) Rosewall	4–6, 6–2, 6–3
198	1969	Pacific SW	Round of 16	Hard	(United States) Gonzales	6–4, 11–13, 6–4
199	1969-09-05	Midland TX	Final	Hard	(Australia) Rosewall	5–7, 6–1, 7–5
200	1969	Las Vegas	Quarterfinal	Hard	(United States) Gonzales	6–4, 1–6, 6–3
201	1970–03	New South Wales Open	Quarterfinal	Grass	(Australia) Rosewall	6–0, 10–8, 6–2
202	1970-05-01	Dayton	Pro	Hard (i)	(United States) Gonzales	6–4, 6–4
203	1970–11	Wembley	Quarterfinal	Carpet (i)	(Australia) Rosewall	6–2, 6–3

- (i) means it was played indoors; (O) means it was played outdoors
- The star (*) means it was most probably indoor wood, but there is a chance it was indoor hard

== See also ==
- List of tennis rivalries
- Laver–Rosewall rivalry

== Sources ==
- Joe McCauley, The History of Professional Tennis, London 2001
- World Tennis (The US Magazine)
- World of Tennis (Annuals edited by John Barrett)
- Marion Anthony "Tony" Trabert in Tennis de France (French magazine)
- ATP Gonzales Rosewall Head to Head
