= Cochet–Tilden rivalry =

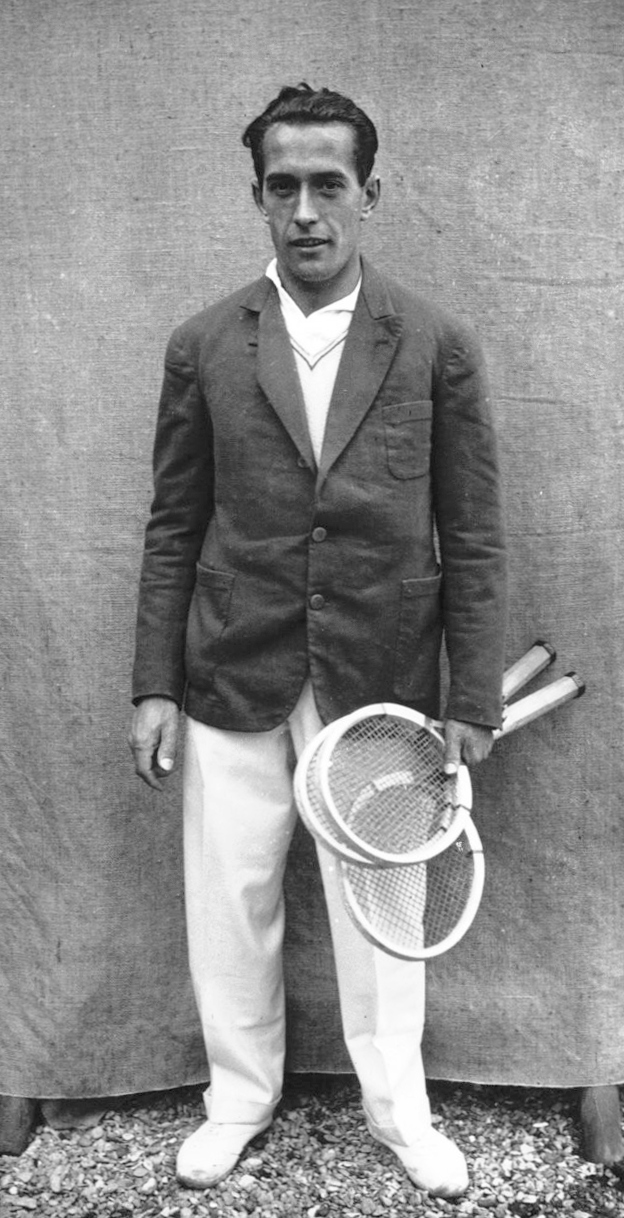
Henri Cochet (11 Major singles, 8 Major doubles, 4 Major mixed doubles, 2 Olympic Silvers singles and doubles, World No.1)

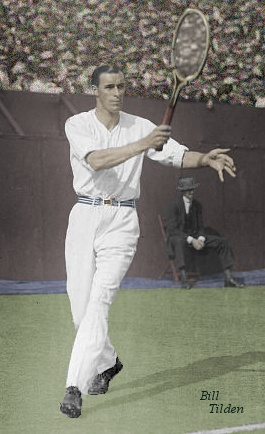
Bill Tilden (15 Major singles, 4 Major doubles, 4 Major mixed doubles, World No 1.)

This was a tennis rivalry played between the French player Henri Cochet, and the American player Bill Tilden. In their respective careers the met each other on the court 35 times from 1926 until 1939 it ended with Tilden leading in head to head matches 23-12. In Major championship matches their rivalry ended with Cochet leading Tilden 4-3.

Henri Cochet a former World number 1 and seven-time Grand Slam champion, three-time ITF Major champion and one time Pro Slam champion. Bill Tilden also a former World number 1, a ten-time Grand Slam singles champion, a four-time Pro Slam champion and one-time ILTF Major champion. Both players were Davis Cup champions Cochet six times and Tilden seven times.

== Summary ==
Cochet and Tildens rivalry began during their amateur careers and ended when they were both professionals. They first met each other in the quarter finals of the 1926 US National Championships with Henri Cochet winning their rivalry debut. Their last meeting was again at the quarter final stage of the 1939 French Pro Championships in which Tilden won. They played each other on four surfaces including grass courts, clay courts, hard courts and wood courts as well as indoors and outdoors. In Grand Slam tournaments they met five times it ended with Cochet ahead 4-1. Curtis (2013) ranked their 1927 Wimbledon semi-final meeting as One of the Ten Most Epic Matches in Tennis History. Whilst American sportswriter Al Laney wrote at the time 'One of the Most Famous Tennis Matches Ever Played'. The 1927 Wimbledon Championships was particularly notable from Cochet's stand point as he played and won three consecutive five-set matches en route to becoming champion despite being two sets to love down in the quarter finals, semi finals and the final.

== Head-to-head ==
=== Official matches (Cochet 12–23 Tilden) ===
Included:

Legend (Cochet-Tilden)
Grand Slams (4-1)
Pro Slams (0-2)

(i) denotes indoor tournament.

No	Tournament	Date	Round	Surface	Winner	Runner up	Score
1	US National Championships	1926	Quarter Final	Grass	Henri Cochet	Bill Tilden	6-8 6-1 6-3 1-6 8-6
2	French Championships	1927	Semi Final	Clay	Bill Tilden	Henri Cochet	9-7 6-3 6-2
3	Wimbledon Championships	1927	Semi Final	Grass	Henri Cochet	Bill Tilden	2-6 4-6 7-5 6-4 6-3
4	Davis Cup	1927	Round Robin	Grass	Bill Tilden	Henri Cochet	6-4 2-6 6-2 8-6
5	Davis Cup	1928	Round Robin	Clay	Henri Cochet	Bill Tilden	9-7 8-6 6-4
6	Wimbledon Championships	1929	Semi Final	Grass	Henri Cochet	Bill Tilden	6-4 6-1 7-5
7	Davis Cup	1929	Round Robin	Clay	Henri Cochet	Bill Tilden	6-3 6-1 6-2
8	French Championships	1930	Final	Clay	Henri Cochet	Bill Tilden	3-6 8-6 6-3 6-1
9	Davis Cup	1930	Round Robin	Clay	Henri Cochet	Bill Tilden	4-6 6-3 6-1 7-5
10	France vs. USA Pro	1933	Round Robin	Clay	Bill Tilden	Henri Cochet	6-3 6-4 6-2
11	USA vs. France Pro Series	1934	Round Robin	Hard	Bill Tilden	Henri Cochet	7-9 6-1 4-6 6-3 6-3
12	USA vs. France Pro Series	1934	Round Robin	Hard	Bill Tilden	Henri Cochet	10-8 6-2 7-5
13	USA vs. France Pro Series	1934	Round Robin	Hard	Henri Cochet	Bill Tilden	7-9 6-2 5-7 6-2 6-2
14	USA vs. France Pro Series	1934	Round Robin	Hard	Bill Tilden	Henri Cochet	6-3 6-3 9-11 6-1
15	USA vs. France Pro Series	1934	Round Robin	Hard	Bill Tilden	Henri Cochet	6-4 6-3 7-5
16	USA vs. France Pro Series	1934	Round Robin	Hard	Bill Tilden	Henri Cochet	11-9 7-9 8-6 7-5
17	USA vs. France Pro Series	1934	Round Robin	Hard	Henri Cochet	Bill Tilden	7-5 5-7 6-2 6-0
18	USA vs. France Pro Series	1934	Round Robin	Hard	Bill Tilden	Henri Cochet	6-3 2-6 6-0 6-2
19	USA vs. France Pro Series	1934	Round Robin	Hard	Bill Tilden	Henri Cochet	7-5 6-2 6-2
20	USA vs. France Pro Series	1934	Round Robin	Hard	Bill Tilden	Henri Cochet	6-4 4-6 8-6 3-6 6-3
21	Eastern Pro Championship	1934	Round Robin	Clay	Bill Tilden	Henri Cochet	9-7 6-2 6-4
22	Middle States Pro Championship	1934	Semi Final	Clay	Bill Tilden	Henri Cochet	6-1 6-1 6-0
23	France vs. USA Pro III	1934	Round Robin	Hard	Bill Tilden	Henri Cochet	6-2 6-4 4-6 6-3
24	Lyon Pro	1934	Final	Clay	Bill Tilden	Henri Cochet	3-6 6-3 7-5 6-4
25	La Baule Pro	1936	Final	Clay	Henri Cochet	Bill Tilden	6-4 3-6 6-0 6-2
26	Bonnardel Cup	1936	Round Robin	Grass	Bill Tilden	Henri Cochet	6-4 6-4 2-6 3-6 6-3
27	Scheveningen Pro	1937	Final	Clay	Bill Tilden	Henri Cochet	6-2 8-6 1-6 6-1
28	France vs. USA Pro	1937	Round Robin	Clay	Bill Tilden	Henri Cochet	?
29	France vs. USA Pro	1937	Round Robin	Clay	Bill Tilden	Henri Cochet	?
30	Wembley Pro Championship	1937	Semi Final	Hard (i)	Bill Tilden	Henri Cochet	6-3 6-2 6-3
31	Florence Pro	1937	3RD	Hard (i)	Bill Tilden	Henri Cochet	6-4 8-6
32	Milan Pro	1937	Round Robin	Hard (i)	Bill Tilden	Henri Cochet	6-4 3-6 6-1
33	Rome Pro	1937	Semi Final	Hard (i)	Henri Cochet	Bill Tilden	?
34	Olympia Pro	1939	Round Robin	Hard (i)	Henri Cochet	Bill Tilden	2-6 6-4 6-3
35	French Pro Championship	1939	Quarter Final	Clay	Bill Tilden	Henri Cochet	3-6 9-7 6-3 3-6 7-5

== Breakdown of their rivalry ==
- All matches: Tilden, 23–12
- Major matches Cochet, 4–3
- All finals: Tied, 2–2
- Grand Slam finals: Cochet, 1–0
- Clay courts: Tilden, 9–5
- Grass courts: Cochet, 3–2
- Hard courts: Tilden, 11–4
- Wood courts: Tilden, 1–0
- Outdoor courts: Tilden, 18-9
- Indoor courts: Tilden, 5-3
- Davis Cup matches: Cochet, 3-1

== See also ==
- List of tennis rivalries

== Sources ==
- Association of Tennis Professionals. (2018). Henri Cochet VS Bill Tilden Head 2 Head ATP World Tour "Tennis". ATP World Tour. London, England.
- Baltzell, E. Digby (2013). Sporting Gentlemen: Men's Tennis from the Age of Honor to the Cult of the Superstar. Piscataway, New Jersey, United States: Transaction Publishers. ISBN 9781412851800.
- Curtis, Jake (2013). "Ranking the 10 Most Epic Matches in Tennis History". Bleacher Report. Turner Publishing Inc.
- Garcia, Gabriel (2018). "Jean Borotra -Henri Cochet-Matches Head 2 Head". thetennisbase.com. Madrid, Spain: Tennismem SAL.
- Morris, James; Hegedus, Tomas (2013). "1877 to 2012 Finals Results". www.stevegtennis.com. stevegtennis.
