= Hingis–S. Williams rivalry =

Tennis rivalry

The Hingis–S. Williams rivalry was a tennis rivalry between Martina Hingis and Serena Williams, who met 13 times between 1998 and 2002. Their head-to-head is 7–6, in Williams' favor. They turned pro within a year of each other, Hingis in October 1994 and Serena in September 1995.

== Head-to-head ==
Legend	Hingis	Williams
Grand Slam	1	2
WTA Tier I	3	2
WTA Tier II	2	3
Total	6	7

=== Singles ===
Martina Hingis–Serena Williams (6–7)

No.	Year	Tournament	Tier	Surface	Round	Winner	Score	Length	Sets	Hingis	Williams
1.	1998	(United States) Miami Open	Tier I	Hard	Quarterfinals	Hingis	6–3, 1–6, 7–6^{(7–4)}	2:03	3/3	1	0
2.	1998	(United States) LA Women's Tennis Championships	Tier II	Hard	Quarterfinals	Hingis	6–4, 6–1	1:05	2/3	2	0
3.	1999	(United States) Miami Open	Tier I	Hard	Semifinals	Williams	6–4, 7–6^{(7–3)}	1:46	2/3	2	1
4.	1999	(Italy) Italian Open	Tier I	Clay	Quarterfinals	Hingis	6–2, 6–2	1:02	2/3	3	1
5.	1999	(United States) LA Women's Tennis Championships	Tier II	Hard	Semifinals	Williams	6–3, 7–5	1:09	2/3	3	2
6.	1999	(United States) US Open	Major	Hard	Final	Williams	6–3, 7–6^{(7–4)}	1:42	2/3	3	3
7.	2000	(United States) LA Women's Tennis Championships	Tier II	Hard	Semifinals	Williams	4–6, 6–2, 6–3	1:55	3/3	3	4
8.	2000	(Canada) Canadian Open	Tier I	Hard	Final	Hingis	0–6, 6–3, 3–0 RET	1:07	3/3	4	4
9.	2001	(Australia) Sydney International	Tier II	Hard	Quarterfinals	Hingis	6–4, 7–5	1:39	2/3	5	4
10.	2001	(Australia) Australian Open	Major	Hard	Quarterfinals	Hingis	6–2, 3–6, 8–6	2:19	3/3	6	4
11.	2001	(United States) US Open	Major	Hard	Semifinals	Williams	6–3, 6–2	0:51	2/3	6	5
12.	2002	(United States) State Farm Women's Tennis Classic	Tier II	Hard	Semifinals	Williams	6–1, 3–6, 6–4	1:36	3/3	6	6
13.	2002	(United States) Miami Open	Tier I	Hard	Quarterfinals	Williams	6–4, 6–0	0:59	2/3	6	7

=== Doubles ===
Martina Hingis–Serena Williams (2–2)

No.	Year	Tournament	Tier	Surface	Round	Winners	Score	Opponents	Hingis	Williams
1.	1998	(United States) Indian Wells Masters	Tier I	Hard	Semifinals	Hingis/Lučić	7–5, 4–6, 6–1	S.Williams/V.Williams	1	0
2.	1999	(France) Roland Garros	Major	Clay	Final	S.Williams/V.Williams	6–3, 6–7^{(2–7)}, 8–6	Hingis/Kournikova	1	1
3.	2001	(Australia) Sydney International	Tier II	Hard	Round of 16	Hingis/Seles	6–4, 3–6, 7–6^{(7–2)}	S.Williams/V.Williams	2	1
4.	2001	(Australia) Australian Open	Major	Hard	Semifinals	S.Williams/V.Williams	7–5, 6–2	Hingis/Seles	2	2

== Exhibitions ==
=== Singles ===
Martina Hingis–Serena Williams (1–1)

No.	Year	Tournament Name	Tournament Location	Surface	Winner	Score
1.	2011	World TeamTennis	New York City, United States	Hard (i)	Williams	5–3
2.	2011	World TeamTennis	New York City, U.S.	Hard (i)	Hingis	5–3

=== Doubles ===
Martina Hingis–Serena Williams (0–2)

No.	Year	Tournament Name	Tournament Location	Surface	Winners	Losers	Score
1.	2011	World TeamTennis	New York City, United States	Hard (i)	Williams/Stubbs	Hingis/O’Brien	5–2
2.	2011	World TeamTennis	New York City, U.S.	Hard (i)	Williams/Stubbs	Hingis/O’Brien	5–3

=== Mixed doubles ===
Martina Hingis–Serena Williams (1–1)

No.	Year	Tournament Name	Tournament Location	Surface	Winners	Losers	Score
1.	2011	World TeamTennis	New York City, United States	Hard (i)	Hingis/Parrott	Williams/Paes	5–4^{(5–1)}
2.	2011	World TeamTennis	New York City, U.S.	Hard (i)	Williams/Paes	Hingis/Parrott	5–1

== Breakdown of the rivalry ==
- Hard courts: Williams, 7–5
- Clay courts: Hingis, 1–0
- Grass courts: None
- Carpet: None
- Grand Slam matches: Williams, 2–1
- Grand Slam finals: Williams, 1–0
- Year-End Championships matches: None
- Year-End Championships finals: None
- Fed Cup matches: None
- All finals: Tied, 1–1

== See also ==
- List of tennis rivalries
