= Graf–Seles rivalry =

Women's Tennis Rivalry in 1989/1990

Graf–Seles rivalry

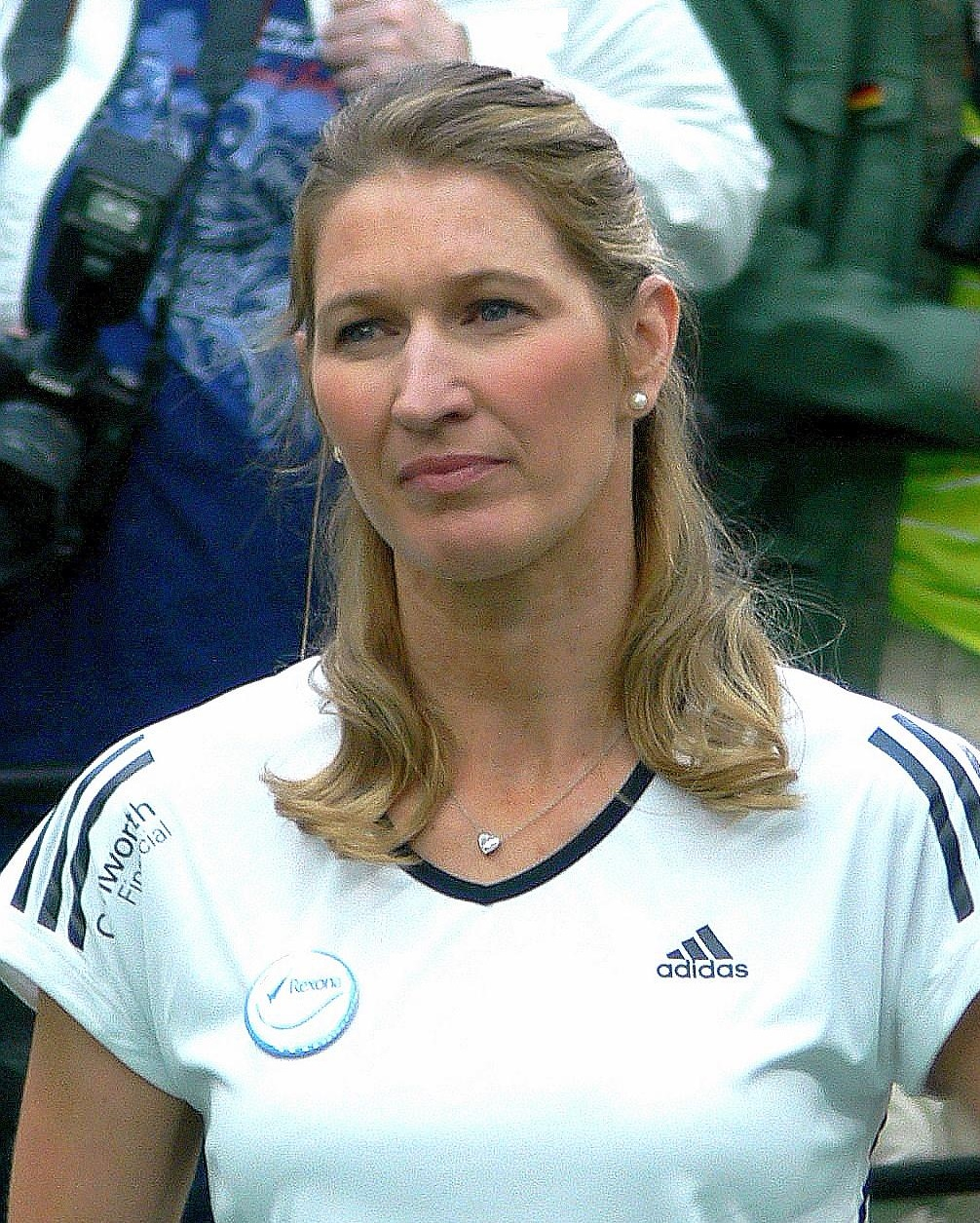
Steffi Graf

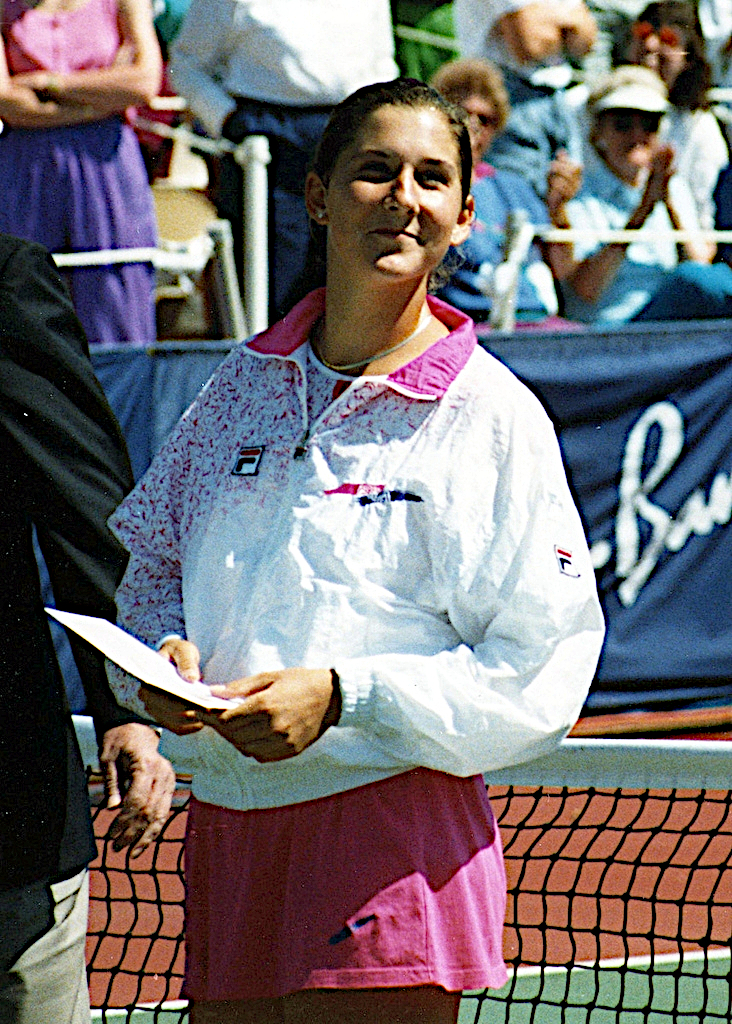
Monica Seles

The Graf–Seles rivalry was a tennis rivalry between Steffi Graf and Monica Seles, who competed in 15 matches between 1989 and 1999. Seles, a left-handed player, demonstrated powerful and precise hitting from the baseline on both wings and an exceptional return of serve. Graf, in contrast, had a formidable forehand, in addition to her penetrating serve, first rate foot speed, and mostly sliced her backhand.

Their rivalry was especially notable for its change over time. Graf was dominant on tour in Seles' first years, then Seles was dominant at the Grand Slams winning three of the four matches they played between the ages of 17 and 19. During the period where Seles first reached the No. 1 spot in 1991, the head-to-head saw Graf leading 3–2, with all of their matches coming in tournament finals. In April 1993, the rivalry was temporarily halted when a fan of Graf stabbed Seles on-court, prompting her to take a hiatus after recovering. Graf won four of their five matches from 1995 onward.

== List of all matches ==
| Legend | Graf | Seles |
|---|---|---|
| Grand Slam | 6 | 4 |
| WTA Tour Championships | 1 | 0 |
| WTA Tier I | 0 | 1 |
| WTA Tier II | 2 | 0 |
| WTA Tier III | 1 | 0 |
| Total | 10 | 5 |

Graf–Seles (10–5)

| No. | Year | Tournament | Tier | Surface | Round | Winner | Score | Graf | Seles |
|---|---|---|---|---|---|---|---|---|---|
| 1. | 1989 | Roland Garros | Grand Slam | Clay | Semifinals | Graf | 6–3, 3–6, 6–3 | 1 | 0 |
| 2. | 1989 | Wimbledon | Grand Slam | Grass | Round of 16 | Graf | 6–0, 6–1 | 2 | 0 |
| 3. | 1989 | Brighton International | Tier II | Carpet | Final | Graf | 7–5, 6–4 | 3 | 0 |
| 4. | 1990 | German Open | Tier I | Clay | Final | Seles | 6–4, 6–3 | 3 | 1 |
| 5. | 1990 | Roland Garros | Grand Slam | Clay | Final | Seles | 7–6^{(8–6)}, 6–4 | 3 | 2 |
| 6. | 1991 | US Women's Hard Court Championships | Tier III | Hard | Final | Graf | 6–4, 6–3 | 4 | 2 |
| 7. | 1991 | WTA Hamburg | Tier II | Clay | Final | Graf | 7–5, 6–7^{(4–7)}, 6–3 | 5 | 2 |
| 8. | 1992 | Roland Garros | Grand Slam | Clay | Final | Seles | 6–2, 3–6, 10–8 | 5 | 3 |
| 9. | 1992 | Wimbledon | Grand Slam | Grass | Final | Graf | 6–2, 6–1 | 6 | 3 |
| 10. | 1993 | Australian Open | Grand Slam | Hard | Final | Seles | 4–6, 6–3, 6–2 | 6 | 4 |
| 11. | 1995 | US Open | Grand Slam | Hard | Final | Graf | 7–6^{(8–6)}, 0–6, 6–3 | 7 | 4 |
| 12. | 1996 | US Open | Grand Slam | Hard | Final | Graf | 7–5, 6–4 | 8 | 4 |
| 13. | 1998 | WTA Tour Championships | Tour Finals | Carpet | Quarterfinals | Graf | 1–6, 6–4, 6–4 | 9 | 4 |
| 14. | 1999 | Australian Open | Grand Slam | Hard | Quarterfinals | Seles | 7–5, 6–1 | 9 | 5 |
| 15. | 1999 | Roland Garros | Grand Slam | Clay | Semifinals | Graf | 6–7^{(2–7)}, 6–3, 6–4 | 10 | 5 |

== Breakdown of the rivalry ==
- Hard courts: Graf, 3–2
- Clay courts: Equal, 3–3
- Grass courts: Graf, 2–0
- Carpet courts: Graf, 2–0
- Grand Slam matches: Graf, 6–4
- Grand Slam finals: Equal, 3–3
- Year-End Championships matches: Graf, 1–0
- Year-End Championships finals: None
- Fed Cup matches: None
- All finals: Graf, 6–4
- All matches: Graf, 10–5

== WTA rankings ==
=== Year-end ranking timeline ===
| Player | 1982 | 1983 | 1984 | 1985 | 1986 | 1987 | 1988 | 1989 | 1990 | 1991 | 1992 | 1993 | 1994 | 1995 | 1996 | 1997 | 1998 | 1999 | 2000 | 2001 | 2002 | 2003 |
|---|---|---|---|---|---|---|---|---|---|---|---|---|---|---|---|---|---|---|---|---|---|---|
| Steffi Graf | 124 | 93 | 22 | 6 | 3 | 1 | 1 | 1 | 1 | 2 | 2 | 1 | 1 | 1 | 1 | 28 | 9 | | | | | |
| Monica Seles | | | | | | | 86 | 6 | 2 | 1 | 1 | 8 | | 1^{PR} | 2 | 5 | 6 | 6 | 4 | 10 | 7 | 60 |

== History ==
Graf won eight of nine majors before Seles won her first. Seles surpassed Graf as the No. 1 player in March 1991, and won seven of nine grand slam titles during the period of 1991–1993. The two traded the number one ranking through the summer of 1991 before Seles consolidated her hold on the top spot. Graf in the end did recapture the No. 1 ranking from Seles in June 1993, after Seles was forced out of the sport due to her stabbing.

=== Notable matches ===
- 1992 French Open final: Seles made an excellent start, Graf recovered and saved six championship points before Seles won by 10–8 in the third set, to win her third consecutive French Open Singles title. This match was voted the best women's match of the 20th Century.
- 1992 Wimbledon final: Graf easily defeated Seles 6–2, 6–1, in a one-sided final. The match was notable for Seles refusing to grunt after massive media criticism of her grunting in the days before, and for constant rain delays during the second set.
- 1993 Australian Open final: A high quality final where Seles came from a set behind to defeat Graf and win her third consecutive Australian Open Women's Singles title.
- 1995 US Open final: The first post-stabbing match between Seles and Graf. Graf won a close final in three sets, despite losing the second set 0–6.
- 1996 US Open final: Graf won 7–5, 6–4, with Graf playing at the peak of her powers. The match was more one-sided than the scoreline suggested. The end of the match and the trophy ceremony saw pouring rain.
- 1998 Chase Championship quarterfinal: Graf recovered from a poor start to win a close match 1–6, 6–4, 6–4.
- 1999 Australian Open quarterfinal: Seles won 7–5, 6–1, and finished the match strongly, for her only post-stabbing victory over Graf.
- 1999 French Open semifinal: Graf defeated Seles in a three-set match after coming from a set behind. This was their last ever head-to-head match. Graf went on to win the title, the last Grand Slam won before retirement.

== See also ==
- List of tennis rivalries
- 1993 Citizen Cup
