= Henin–S. Williams rivalry =

Tennis rivalry

The Henin–S. Williams rivalry was a tennis rivalry between Justine Henin and Serena Williams, who met 14 times between 2001 and 2010. When Henin was an active player, their rivalry was one of the most heated and competitive on the WTA Tour; their contests were not just athletic in nature, but also personal as Henin made a controversial gesture during their 2003 French Open semifinal encounter. Williams leads their head-to-head, 8–6.

== Head-to-head ==
Legend	Henin	Williams
Grand Slam	4	3
WTA Tour Championships	0	1
WTA Tier I	2	3
WTA Tier II	0	1
Total	6	8

Justine Henin–Serena Williams (6–8)

No.	Year	Tournament	Tier	Surface	Round	Winner	Score	Length	Sets	Henin	Williams
1.	2001	US Open	Major	Hard	Round of 16	Williams	7–5, 6–0	1:16	2/3	0	1
2.	2001	WTA Tour Championships	Tour Finals	Carpet	Quarterfinals	Williams	6–3, 7–6^{(7–5)}	1:22	2/3	0	2
3.	2002	German Open	Tier I	Clay	Final	Henin	6–2, 1–6, 7–6^{(7–5)}	2:17	3/3	1	2
4.	2002	Italian Open	Tier I	Clay	Final	Williams	7–6^{(8–6)}, 6–4	1:58	2/3	1	3
5.	2002	Sparkassen Cup	Tier II	Hard (i)	Semifinals	Williams	6–4, 6–2	1:10	2/3	1	4
6.	2003	Charleston Open	Tier I	Clay	Final	Henin	6–3, 6–4	1:06	2/3	2	4
7.	2003	Roland Garros	Major	Clay	Semifinals	Henin	6–2, 4–6, 7–5	2:20	3/3	3	4
8.	2003	Wimbledon	Major	Grass	Semifinals	Williams	6–3, 6–2	1:10	2/3	3	5
9.	2007	Miami Open	Tier I	Hard	Final	Williams	0–6, 7–5, 6–3	2:26	3/3	3	6
10.	2007	Roland Garros	Major	Clay	Quarterfinals	Henin	6–4, 6–3	1:18	2/3	4	6
11.	2007	Wimbledon	Major	Grass	Quarterfinals	Henin	6–4, 3–6, 6–3	1:45	3/3	5	6
12.	2007	US Open	Major	Hard	Quarterfinals	Henin	7–6^{(7–3)}, 6–1	1:37	2/3	6	6
13.	2008	Miami Open	Tier I	Hard	Quarterfinals	Williams	6–2, 6–0	1:20	2/3	6	7
14.	2010	Australian Open	Major	Hard	Final	Williams	6–4, 3–6, 6–2	2:07	3/3	6	8

== Breakdown of the rivalry ==
- All courts: Williams, 8–6
- Hard courts: Williams, 4–1
- Clay courts: Henin, 4–1
- Grass courts: Equal, 1–1
- Carpet: Williams, 2–0
- Grand Slam matches: Henin, 4–3
- Grand Slam finals: Williams, 1–0
- Year-End Championships matches: Williams, 1–0
- Year-End Championships finals: None
- Fed Cup matches: None
- Matches won after saving match points: Williams, 1–0
- All finals: Williams, 3–2
- Sets Won: Williams, 19–14
- Games Won: Williams, 164–146

== Performance timeline ==
=== Grand Slam tournaments ===
Key
**W**	F	SF	QF	#R	RR	Q#	P#	DNQ	A	Z#	PO	**G**	S	B	NMS	NTI	P	NH

(W) winner; (F) finalist; (SF) semifinalist; (QF) quarterfinalist; (#R) rounds 4, 3, 2, 1; (RR) round-robin stage; (Q#) qualification round; (P#) preliminary round; (DNQ) did not qualify; (A) absent; (Z#) Davis/Fed Cup Zonal Group (with number indication) or (PO) play-off; (G) gold, (S) silver or (B) bronze Olympic/Paralympic medal; (NMS) not a Masters tournament; (NTI) not a Tier I tournament; (P) postponed; (NH) not held; (SR) strike rate (events won / competed); (W–L) win–loss record.
- **Bold** = players met during this tournament

==== By Year ====
===== 1998–2003 =====
Player	1998				1999				2000				2001				2002				2003			
Player	AUS	FRA	WIM	USA	AUS	FRA	WIM	USA	AUS	FRA	WIM	USA	AUS	FRA	WIM	USA	AUS	FRA	WIM	USA	AUS	FRA	WIM	USA
(Belgium) **Justine Henin**					A	2R	A	1R	2R	A	1R	4R	4R	SF	F	4R	QF	1R	SF	4R	SF	**W**	SF	W
(United States) **Serena Williams**	2R	4R	3R	3R	3R	3R	A	W	4R	A	SF	QF	QF	QF	QF	F	A	W	W	W	W	**SF**	W	A

===== 2004–2009 =====
Player	2004				2005				2006				2007				2008				2009			
Player	AUS	FRA	WIM	USA	AUS	FRA	WIM	USA	AUS	FRA	WIM	USA	AUS	FRA	WIM	USA	AUS	FRA	WIM	USA	AUS	FRA	WIM	USA
(Belgium) **Justine Henin**	W	2R	A	4R	A	W	1R	4R	F	W	F	F	A	**W**	**SF**	**W**	QF	A	A	A	A	A	A	A
(United States) **Serena Williams**	A	QF	F	QF	W	A	3R	4R	3R	A	A	3R	W	**QF**	**QF**	**QF**	QF	3R	F	W	W	QF	W	SF

===== 2010–2015 =====
Player	2010				2011				2012				2013				2014				2015			
Player	AUS	FRA	WIM	USA	AUS	FRA	WIM	USA	AUS	FRA	WIM	USA	AUS	FRA	WIM	USA	AUS	FRA	WIM	USA	AUS	FRA	WIM	USA
(Belgium) **Justine Henin**	**F**	4R	4R	A	3R	A	A	A	A	A	A	A	A	A	A	A	A	A	A	A	A	A	A	A
(United States) **Serena Williams**	**W**	QF	W	A	A	A	4R	F	4R	1R	W	W	QF	W	4R	W	4R	2R	3R	W	W	W	W	SF

== See also ==
- List of tennis rivalries
- Clijsters–Henin rivalry
- Williams sisters rivalry
