= Evert–Mandlikova rivalry =

Tennis rivalry

The Evert–Mandlíková rivalry was a tennis rivalry between Chris Evert and Hana Mandlíková, who met 26 times during their careers. Evert leads their head-to-head 19–7. In 1981 the rivalry was described as the most "dramatic" in women's tennis.

== Head-to-head ==
Legend	Evert	Mandlikova
Grand Slam	10	3
Virginia Slims Championships	0	1
Tour Events	9	3
Total	19	7

Evert–Mandlikova (19–7)

No.	Year	Tournament	Surface	Round	Winner	Score	Evert	Mandlikova
1.	1980	Italian Open	Clay	Semifinals	Evert	6–4, 3–6, 6–3	1	0
2.	1980	Roland Garros	Clay	Semifinals	Evert	6–7^{(6–8)}, 6–2, 6–2	2	0
3.	1980	US Open	Hard	Final	Evert	5–7, 6–1, 6–1	3	0
4.	1980	WTA Atlanta	Carpet	Semifinals	Mandlikova	6–1, 6–4	3	1
5.	1981	Clairol Crown	Hard	Final	Evert	6–4, 6–3	4	1
6.	1981	Roland Garros	Clay	Semifinals	Mandlikova	7–5, 6–4	4	2
7.	1981	Wimbledon	Grass	Final	Evert	6–2, 6–2	5	2
8.	1981	Canadian Open	Hard	Quarterfinals	Evert	6–3, 7–6^{(7–1)}	6	2
9.	1981	US Open	Hard	Quarterfinals	Evert	6–1, 6–3	7	2
10.	1981	Australian Open	Grass	Quarterfinals	Evert	6–4, 7–5	8	2
11.	1982	Italian Open	Clay	Final	Evert	6–0, 6–2	9	2
12.	1982	US Open	Hard	Final	Evert	6–3, 6–1	10	2
13.	1983	Amelia Island Championships	Clay	Semifinals	Evert	6–1, 6–4	11	2
14.	1983	Roland Garros	Clay	Quarterfinals	Evert	4–6, 6–3, 6–2	12	2
15.	1983	US Open	Hard	Quarterfinals	Evert	6–4, 6–3	13	2
16.	1984	Wimbledon	Grass	Semifinals	Evert	6–1, 6–2	14	2
17.	1985	Virginia Slims of California	Carpet	Final	Mandlikova	6–2, 6–4	14	3
18.	1985	Ford Cup	Clay	Final	Evert	6–3, 6–3	15	3
19.	1985	Canadian Open	Hard	Semifinals	Evert	3–6, 6–2, 6–4	16	3
20.	1985	US Open	Hard	Semifinals	Mandlikova	4–6, 6–2, 6–3	16	4
21.	1986	Virginia Slims Championships	Carpet	Semifinals	Mandlikova	6–3, 7–5	16	5
22.	1986	Roland Garros	Clay	Semifinals	Evert	6–1, 6–1	17	5
23.	1986	Wimbledon	Grass	Semifinals	Mandlikova	7–6^{(7–5)}, 7–5	17	6
24.	1987	Miami Open	Hard	Semifinals	Evert	7–5, 6–0	18	6
25.	1987	Virginia Slims of Houston	Clay	Semifinals	Evert	6–3, 7–5	19	6
26.	1989	Virginia Slims of Indian Wells	Hard	Round of 16	Mandlikova	3–6, 7–6^{(7–2)}, 6–0	19	7

== Head-to-head breakdown ==
- All finals: Evert 5–1
- Grand Slam matches: Evert 10–3
- Grand Slam finals: Evert 3–0
- Grand Slam semifinals: Tied 3–3
- Non-Grand Slam finals: Evert 2–1
- Three-set matches: Evert 6–2

== See also ==
- List of tennis rivalries
