= Doherty–Mahony rivalry =

Tennis rivalry

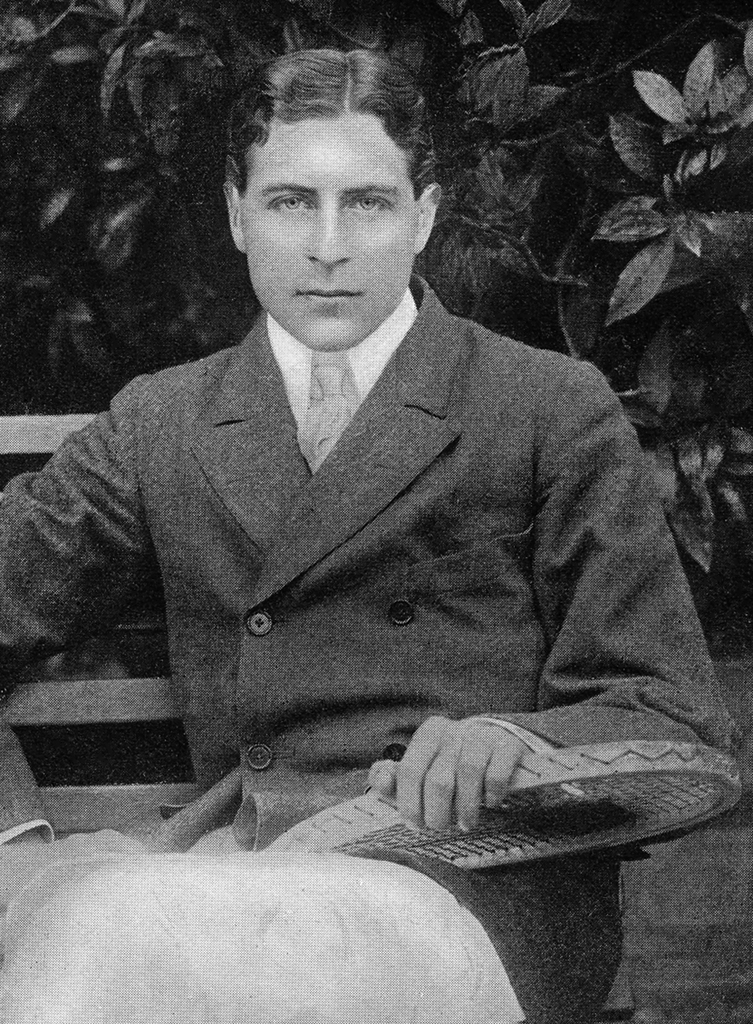
Laurence Doherty (World No 1
6 Major singles
2 Olympic gold medals, singles & doubles

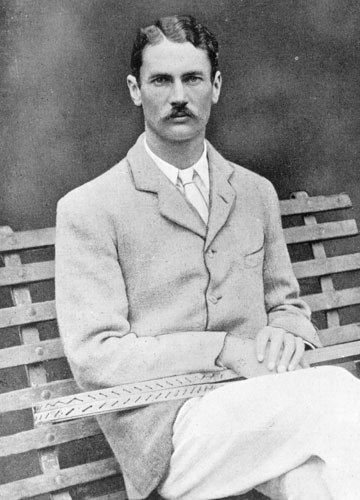
Harold Mahony (World No 2
1 Major singles
2 Olympic silver medals singles)

This was a tennis rivalry played between British player Laurence Doherty and the Irish player Harold Mahony, which in their respective careers met 18 times from 1896 until 1904.

Doherty and Mahony were both Grand Slam winners with Doherty winning six slam titles and two Olympic golds and Mahony winning one slam title, two Olympic silver medals and one bronze medal. Throughout their respective careers Doherty won 66 titles and Mahony 59 titles.

They first met in 1896 at the London Championships, Doherty was 22 years old when he first met 29 years old Mahony. At the Grand Slams they met three times, twice at Wimbledon and Doherty led (2-0) in matches and once at the U.S. National Championships, Doherty led (1-0) they also met in the 1900 Paris Olympics final with Doherty again winning (1-0).

They played each other predominately on grass courts but also on clay courts and indoors on hard wood courts.

== Challenge Rounds ==
Challenge Round: the final round of a tournament, in which the winner of a single-elimination phase (final) faces the previous year's champion, who plays only that one match. The challenge round was used in some tournaments in the early history of tennis (from 1877 through 1921).

== Head-to-head ==
=== Official matches (Doherty 14–4 Mahony) ===
Legend (Doherty-Mahony)
Grand Slams (3-0)
Olympics (1-0)

No.	Year	Tournament	Surface	Round	Winner	Score
1.	1896	London Championships	Grass	SF	(Ireland) Mahony	6–3, 4–6, 6–2, 2–6, 10–8
2.	1897	London Championships	Grass	QF	(United Kingdom) Doherty	w.o
3.	1898	Northern Championships	Grass	R2	(United Kingdom) Doherty	6–1, 6–8, 6–3, 2–6, 7–5
4.	1898	Wimbledon Championships	Grass	F	(United Kingdom) Doherty	6–1, 6–2, 4–6, 2–6, 14-12
5.	1898	London Championships	Grass	F	(United Kingdom) Doherty	6–3, 6–4, 9–7
6.	1898	Scottish Championships	Grass	SF	(United Kingdom) Doherty	6–2 6–0
7.	1898	The Homburg Cup	Clay	SF	(United Kingdom) Doherty	6–3, 6–2
8.	1898	Welsh Covered Court Championships	Hard (i)	F	(Ireland) Mahony	5–7, 6–4, 7–5, 6–4
9.	1900	Olympics	Clay	F	(United Kingdom) Doherty	6–4, 6–2, 6–3
10.	1900	Dinard International	Clay	CR	(United Kingdom) Doherty	4–6, 6–1, 8–6, 7–5
11.	1901	Kent Championships	Grass	CR	(United Kingdom) Doherty	4–6, 6–1, 8–6, 7–5
12.	1902	Leicestershire Championships	Grass	F	(Ireland) Mahony	w.o.
13.	1902	Wimbledon Championships	Grass	SF	(United Kingdom) Doherty	4–6, 4–6, 8–6, 2-0 (ret)
14.	1902	European Championships	Hard (i)	F	(United Kingdom) Doherty	4–6, 6–4, 6–3, 6–1
15.	1903	Middlesex Championships	Grass	R2	(Ireland) Mahony	w.o.
16.	1903	U.S. National Championships	Grass	R4	(United Kingdom) Doherty	6–3, 6–2, 6–4
17.	1904	Northumberland Championships	Grass	R3	(United Kingdom) Doherty	6–2, 6–0
18.	1904	London Covered Court Championships	Hard (i)	R2	(United Kingdom) Doherty	7–5, 6–3, 3–6, 6–4

== Breakdown of their rivalry ==
- All matches: Doherty, 14–4
- Outdoor courts: Doherty, 13-2
- Clay courts: Doherty, 1–0
- Grass courts: Doherty, 13–2
- Indoor hard courts: Doherty, 2–1
- Grand Slam matches: Doherty, 3–0
- Grand Slam finals: Doherty, 1–0
- Olympic finals: Doherty, 1-0
- All finals: Doherty, 6–2

== Sources ==
- https://app.thetennisbase.com/Laurence Doherty v Harold Mahony, Head to Head, 1896 to 1904
