= Top ten ranked male tennis players (1912–1972) =

This article presents top ten lists of male singles tennis players, as ranked by various official and non-official ranking authorities throughout the history of the sport. Rankings of U.S.-only professionals pre-Open Era, and U.S.-only amateurs during World War II are also included.

The article is split into two sections: 1912–1972, and since 1973 when the first official ATP rankings were published, for ease of navigation.

== Top ten rankings by year ==
=== 1912 ===
A. E. Crawley (Note: Revision of his first ranking published in October 1912,)	E. B. Dewhurst	R. Norris Williams
1. N. Brookes; 2. A. Gobert; 3. A. Wilding; 4. J. Cecil Parke; 5. W. Larned; 6. B. Wright; 7. M. McLoughlin; 8. C. Dixon; 9. A. Gore; 10. O. Froitzheim	1. N. Brookes; 2. A. Wilding; 3. M. McLoughlin; 4. J. Cecil Parke; 5. R. Williams; 6. A. Gobert; 7. A. Gore; 8. W. Johnson; 9. O. Froitzheim; 10. C. Dixon	1. N. Brookes; 2. M. McLoughlin; 3. A. Wilding; 4. J. Cecil Parke; 5. A. Gobert; 6. O. Froitzheim; 7. W. Johnson; 8. H. Roper Barrett; 9. M. Decugis; 10. C. Dixon; (didn't rank himself)

=== 1913 ===
Amateur
E. B. Dewhurst	A. Wallis Myers (The Daily Telegraph)	American Lawn Tennis	B. H. Liddell Hart (The Times)	The Field	Lawn-Tennis
1. A. Wilding; 2. N. Brookes; 3. J. Cecil Parke; 4. M. McLoughlin; 5. R. Williams; 6. C. Dixon; 7. H. Roper Barrett; 8. O. Froitzheim; 9. B. Johnston; 10. S. Doust	1. A. Wilding; 2. = N. Brookes = M. McLoughlin; 4. J. Cecil Parke; 5. R. Williams; 6. C. Dixon; 7. O. Froitzheim; 8. S. Doust; 9. A. Gobert; 10. M. Decugis	1. J. Cecil Parke; 2. N. Brookes; 3. A. Wilding; 4. M. McLoughlin; 5. R. Williams; 6. C. Dixon; 7. O. Froitzheim; 8. S. Doust; 9. A. Gobert; 10. M. Decugis	1. M. McLoughlin; 2. N. Brookes; 3. A. Wilding; 4. J. Cecil Parke; 5. R. Williams; 6. A. Gobert; 7. M. Decugis; 8. O. Froitzheim; 9. S. Doust; 10. B. Johnston	1. A. Wilding; 2. = N. Brookes = M. McLoughlin; 4. J. Cecil Parke; 5. A. Gobert; 6. O. Froitzheim; 7. R. Williams; 8. M. Decugis; 9. C. Dixon; 10. H. Roper Barrett	1. A. Wilding; 2. N. Brookes; 3. J. Cecil Parke; 4. M. McLoughlin; 5. R. Williams; 6. C. Dixon; 7. H. Roper Barrett; 8. O. Froitzheim; 9. B. Johnston; 10. S. Doust

=== 1914 ===
Amateur
E. B. Dewhurst	A. Wallis Myers	"Argent" (Lawn Tennis and Badminton)	Theodore Mavrogordato
1. M. McLoughlin; 2. N. Brookes; 3. A. Wilding; 4. R. Williams; 5. J. Cecil Parke; 6. O. Froitzheim; 7. B. Johnston; 8. A. Lowe; 9. M. Decugis; 10. R. Lindley Murray	1. M. McLoughlin; 2. = N. Brookes = A. Wilding; 4. O. Froitzheim; 5. R. Williams; 6. J. Cecil Parke; 7. A. Lowe; 8. G. Lowe; 9. M. Decugis; 10. A. Gobert	1. M. McLoughlin; 2. = N. Brookes = A. Wilding = R. Williams; 5. = O. Froitzheim = J. Cecil Parke; 7. G. Lowe; 8. S. Doust; 9. = A. Lowe = T. M. Mavrogordato	1. M. McLoughlin; 2. = N. Brookes = A. Wilding; 4. O. Froitzheim; 5. R. Williams; 6. J. Cecil Parke; 7. A. Lowe; 8. G. Lowe; 9. H. Kleinschroth; 10. M. Decugis

=== 1915–1918 ===
no world rankings (World War I)

=== 1919 ===
Amateur
A. Wallis Myers
1. = G. Patterson
  = B. Johnston
3. A. Gobert
4. B. Tilden
5. N. Brookes
6. A. Kingscote
7. R. Williams
8. P. Davson
9. W. Davis
10. W. Laurentz

=== 1920 ===
Amateur
A. Wallis Myers	"Austral" (R. M. Kidston) (The Referee)
1. B. Tilden; 2. B. Johnston; 3. A. Kingscote; 4. J. Cecil Parke; 5. A. Gobert; 6. N. Brookes; 7. R. Williams; 8. W. Laurentz; 9. Z. Shimizu; 10. G. Patterson	1. B. Tilden; 2. B. Johnston; 3. N. Brookes; 4. A. Kingscote; 5. I. Kumagae; 6. R. Williams; 7. G. Patterson; 8. A. Gobert; 9. Z. Shimizu; 10. J. Cecil Parke

=== 1921 ===
Amateur
A. Wallis Myers	"Austral" (R. M. Kidston)	B. H. Liddell Hart	Bill Tilden (Note: He gave a separate ranking for ability (see citation).)	Gerald Patterson
1. B. Tilden; 2. B. Johnston; 3. V. Richards; 4. Z. Shimizu; 5. G. Patterson; 6. J. Anderson; 7. B. Norton; 8. M. Alonso; 9. R. Williams; 10. A. Gobert	1. B. Tilden; 2. B. Johnston; 3. B. Norton; 4. M. Alonso; 5. Z. Shimizu; 6. R. Williams; 7. G. Patterson; 8. J. Anderson; 9. N. Brookes; 10. I. Kumagae	1. B. Tilden; 2. B. Johnston; 3. M. Alonso; 4. V. Richards; 5. A. Kingscote; 6. B. Norton; 7. R. Williams; 8. N. Brookes; 9. Z. Shimizu; 10. J. Anderson	1. B. Johnston; 2. J. Cecil Parke; 3. N. Brookes; 4. A. Kingscote; 5. Z. Shimizu; 6. G. Patterson; 7. L. Raymond; 8. T. Mavrogordato; 9. R. Williams; 10. A. Gobert	1. B. Tilden; 2. B. Johnston; 3. R. Williams; 4. W. Davis; 5. I. Kumagae; 6. W. Washburn; 7. W. Johnson; 8. R. Roberts; 9. N. Brookes; 10. V. Richards

=== 1922 ===
Amateur
A. Wallis Myers	S. Wallis Merrihew (American Lawn Tennis)	New York Times	Bill Tilden
1. B. Tilden; 2. B. Johnston; 3. G. Patterson; 4. V. Richards; 5. J. Anderson; 6. H. Cochet; 7. P. O'Hara Wood; 8. R. Williams; 9. A. Kingscote; 10. A. Gobert	1. B. Tilden; 2. B. Johnston; 3. G. Patterson; 4. V. Richards; 5. J. Anderson; 6. M. Alonso; 7. R. Williams; 8. A. Gobert; 9. H. Cochet; 10. P. O'Hara Wood	1. B. Tilden; 2. B. Johnston; 3. V. Richards; 4. G. Patterson; 5. M. Alonso; 6. R. Williams; 7. J. Anderson; 8. P. O'Hara Wood; 9. A. Gobert; 10. H. Kinsey	1. B. Johnston; 2. G. Patterson; 3. V. Richards; 4. J. Anderson; 5. M. Alonso; 6. R. Williams; 7. A. Kingscote; 8. H. Cochet; 9. P. O'Hara Wood; 10. Z. Shimizu; (didn't rank himself)

=== 1923 ===
Amateur
A. Wallis Myers	B. H. Liddell Hart	Bill Tilden
1. B. Tilden; 2. B. Johnston; 3. J. Anderson; 4. R. Williams; 5. F. Hunter; 6. V. Richards; 7. B. Norton; 8. M. Alonso; 9. J. Washer; 10. H. Cochet	1. B. Tilden; 2. B. Johnston; 3. J. Anderson; 4. R. Williams; 5. V. Richards; 6. G. Patterson; 7. M. Alonso; 8. B. Norton; 9. F. Hunter; 10. J. Washer	1. B. Johnston; 2. J. Anderson; 3. F. Hunter; 4. B. Norton; 5. R. Williams; 6. V. Richards; 7. M. Alonso; 8. R. Lacoste; 9. M. de Gomar; 10. J. Washer; (didn't rank himself)

=== 1924 ===
Amateur
A. Wallis Myers	B. H. Liddell Hart	Samuel Brookman
1. B. Tilden; 2. V. Richards; 3. J. Anderson; 4. B. Johnston; 5. R. Lacoste; 6. J. Borotra; 7. H. Kinsey; 8. G. Patterson; 9. H. Cochet; 10. M. Alonso	1. B. Tilden; 2. = B. Johnston = V. Richards = J. Anderson; 5. R. Lacoste; 6. M. Alonso; 7. J. Borotra; 8. H. Kinsey; 9. U. De Morpurgo; 10. H. Cochet	1. B. Tilden; 2. V. Richards; 3. B. Johnston; 4. J. Anderson; 5. R. Lacoste; 6. G. Patterson; 7. H. Kinsey; 8. R. Williams; 9. J. Borotra; 10. = J. Washer = H. Cochet

=== 1925 ===
Amateur
A. Wallis Myers	Maxime Lanet (L'Auto)	Frank Poxon (Daily News)	"Server" (The Australasian)	Bill Tilden (Note: He gave a different ranking in October.)	James Anderson
1. B. Tilden; 2. B. Johnston; 3. V. Richards; 4. R. Lacoste; 5. R. Williams; 6. J. Borotra; 7. G. Patterson; 8. M. Alonso; 9. B. Norton; 10. T. Harada	1. B. Tilden; 2. B. Johnston; 3. R. Lacoste; 4. V. Richards; 5. R. Williams; 6. J. Borotra; 7. M. Alonso; 8. G. Patterson; 9. W. Johnson; 10. B. Norton	1. B. Tilden; 2. B. Johnston; 3. V. Richards; 4. G. Patterson; 5. R. Williams; 6. R. Lacoste; 7. J. Borotra; 8. J. Anderson; 9. J. Brugnon; 10. J. Washer	1. B. Tilden; 2. B. Johnston; 3. V. Richards; 4. R. Lacoste; 5. J. Borotra; 6. G. Patterson; 7. B. Norton; 8. R. Williams; 9. M. Alonso; 10. H. Kinsey	1. B. Johnston; 2. V. Richards; 3. J. Borotra; 4. G. Patterson; 5. J. Anderson; 6. R. Lacoste; 7. M. Alonso; 8. T. Harada; 9. R. Williams; 10. H. Kinsey; (didn't rank himself)	1. B. Tilden; 2. B. Johnston; 3. V. Richards; 4. R. Williams; 5. R. Lacoste; 6. J. Borotra; 7. H. Kinsey; 8. G. Patterson; 9. M. Alonso; 10. T. Harada; (didn't rank himself)

=== 1926 ===
Amateur
A. Wallis Myers	Stanley Doust (Daily Mail)	Suzanne Lenglen	Bill Tilden
1. R. Lacoste; 2. J. Borotra; 3. H. Cochet; 4. B. Johnston; 5. B. Tilden; 6. V. Richards; 7. T. Harada; 8. M. Alonso; 9. H. Kinsey; 10. J. Brugnon	1. R. Lacoste; 2. B. Tilden; 3. B. Johnston; 4. J. Borotra; 5. H. Cochet; 6. M. Alonso; 7. T. Harada; 8. G. Patterson; 9. J. Anderson; 10. D. M. Greig	1. R. Lacoste; 2. J. Borotra; 3. H. Cochet; 4. V. Richards; 5. B. Johnston; 6. B. Tilden; 7. M. Alonso; 8. H. Kinsey; 9. P. Féret; 10. T. Harada	1. R. Lacoste; 2. H. Cochet; 3. V. Richards; 4. B. Tilden; 5. J. Borotra; 6. M. Alonso; 7. T. Harada; 8. B. Johnston; 9. E. Chandler; 10. = J. Brugnon = H. Kinsey

=== 1927 ===
Amateur
A. Wallis Myers	U.S. ranking committee president	Émile Deve	Marcel Berger (L'Opinion)	Jean Samazeuilh (Le Miroir des sports)	Henri Cochet
1. R. Lacoste; 2. B. Tilden; 3. H. Cochet; 4. J. Borotra; 5. M. Alonso; 6. F. Hunter; 7. G. Lott; 8. J. Hennessey; 9. J. Brugnon; 10. Ja. Koželuh	1. R. Lacoste; 2. B. Tilden; 3. H. Cochet; 4. J. Borotra; 5. B. Johnston; 6. F. Hunter; 7. G. Lott; 8. M. Alonso; 9. J. Hennessey; 10. J. Brugnon	1. R. Lacoste; 2. B. Tilden; 3. H. Cochet; 4. J. Borotra; 5. F. Hunter; 6. M. Alonso; 7. J. Hennessey; 8. G. Lott; 9. Ja. Koželuh; 10. = U. De Morpurgo = J. Brugnon	1. R. Lacoste; 2. B. Tilden; 3. H. Cochet; 4. J. Borotra; 5. B. Johnston; 6. U. De Morpurgo; 7. L. Raymond; 8. J. Brugnon; 9. J. Washer; 10. C. Boussus	1. R. Lacoste; 2. B. Tilden; 3. H. Cochet; 4. J. Borotra; 5. M. Alonso; 6. F. Hunter; 7. J. Hennessey; 8. G. Lott; 9. U. De Morpurgo; 10. G. Patterson	1. R. Lacoste; 2. B. Tilden; 3. J. Borotra; 4. B. Johnston; 5. M. Alonso; 6. F. Hunter; 7. G. Lott; 8. J. Hennessey; 9. J. Brugnon; 10. J. Washer

=== 1928 ===
Amateur
A. Wallis Myers	Pierre Gillou (L'Auto)	F. Gordon Lowe (The Scotsman)	W. J. Daish	Vincent Richards	Bill Tilden
1. H. Cochet; 2. R. Lacoste; 3. B. Tilden; 4. F. Hunter; 5. J. Borotra; 6. G. Lott; 7. B. Austin; 8. J. Hennessey; 9. U. De Morpurgo; 10. J. Hawkes	1. H. Cochet; 2. R. Lacoste; 3. B. Tilden; 4. F. Hunter; 5. J. Borotra; 6. G. Lott; 7. J. Hennessey; 8. B. Austin; 9. U. De Morpurgo; 10. J. Crawford	1. H. Cochet; 2. R. Lacoste; 3. B. Tilden; 4. J. Borotra; 5. F. Hunter; 6. G. Lott; 7. J. Hennessey; 8. B. Austin; 9. U. De Morpurgo; 10. J. Crawford	1. H. Cochet; 2. R. Lacoste; 3. B. Tilden; 4. F. Hunter; 5. J. Borotra; 6. U. De Morpurgo; 7. G. Lott; 8. J. Hennessey; 9. J. Crawford; 10. B. Austin	1. H. Cochet; 2. R. Lacoste; 3. B. Tilden; 4. F. Hunter; 5. G. Lott; 6. J. Hennessey; 7. J. Crawford; 8. B. Austin; 9. U. De Morpurgo; 10. J. Hawkes	1. H. Cochet; 2. R. Lacoste; 3. B. Tilden; 4. F. Hunter; 5. J. Borotra; 6. U. De Morpurgo; 7. J. Crawford; 8. G. Lott; 9. J. Hennessey; 10. C. Boussus

Pro
Ray Bowers	Vincent Richards
1. K. Koželuh; 2. V. Richards; 3. R. Ramillon; 4. H. Kinsey; 5. R. Najuch; 6. A. Burke; 7. E. Burke; 8. H. Snodgrass	1. K. Koželuh; 2. V. Richards; 3. H. Kinsey; 4. A. Burke; 5. R. Najuch; 6. H. Snodgrass; 7. J. Negro; 8. P. Heston; 9. C. Wood; 10. = H. Richter = E. Burke

Combined
Ray Bowers
1. H. Cochet
2. R. Lacoste
3. B. Tilden
4. K. Koželuh
5. V. Richards
6. F. Hunter
7. J. Borotra
8. G. Lott

=== 1929 ===
Amateur
A. Wallis Myers	"Austral" (R. M. Kidston).	F. Gordon Lowe (Note: He gave a different ranking in September.)	Vincent Richards	Didier Poulain (L'Auto, combined ranking)	Bill Tilden	Karel Koželuh
1. H. Cochet; 2. R. Lacoste; 3. J. Borotra; 4. B. Tilden; 5. F. Hunter; 6. G. Lott; 7. J. Doeg; 8. J. Van Ryn; 9. B. Austin; 10. U. De Morpurgo	1. R. Lacoste; 2. H. Cochet; 3. B. Tilden; 4. J. Borotra; 5. G. Lott; 6. F. Hunter; 7. U. De Morpurgo; 8. J. Crawford; 9. B. Austin; 10. J. Hennessey	1. H. Cochet; 2. R. Lacoste; 3. B. Tilden; 4. J. Borotra; 5. F. Hunter; 6. J. Van Ryn; 7. G. Lott; 8. J. Doeg; 9. C. Gregory; 10. D. Prenn	1. H. Cochet; 2. R. Lacoste; 3. B. Tilden; 4. J. Borotra; 5. F. Hunter; 6. G. Lott; 7. J. Doeg; 8. J. Van Ryn; 9. U. De Morpurgo; 10. B. Austin	1. H. Cochet; 2. R. Lacoste; 3. B. Tilden; 4. J. Borotra; 5. F. Hunter; 6. G. Lott; 7. J. Doeg; 8. U. De Morpurgo; 9. C. Boussus; 10. = J. Van Ryn = B. Austin	1. H. Cochet; 2. R. Lacoste; 3. B. Tilden; 4. J. Borotra; 5. F. Hunter; 6. U. De Morpurgo; 7. H. Moldenhauer; 8. D. Prenn; 9. B. Austin; 10. = B. von Kehrling = C. Boussus	1. H. Cochet; 2. R. Lacoste; 3. B. Tilden; 4. J. Borotra; 5. F. Hunter; 6. G. Lott; 7. J. Doeg; 8. U. De Morpurgo; 9. C. Boussus; 10. B. Austin

Pro
Ray Bowers	American Lawn Tennis	Bill Tilden	Karel Koželuh
1. K. Koželuh; 2. V. Richards; 3. A. Burke; 4. R. Najuch; 5. R. Ramillon; 6. H. Kinsey; 7. B. Norton; 8. H. Snodgrass	1. K. Koželuh; 2. V. Richards; 3. A. Burke; 4. R. Najuch; 5. H. Snodgrass; 6. H. Kinsey; 7. R. Ramillon; 8. M. Plaa; 9. E. Burke; 10. Jo. Koželuh	1. K. Koželuh; 2. R. Najuch; 3. V. Richards; 4. R. Ramillon; 5. A. Burke; 6. H. Kinsey; 7. M. Plaa; 8. H. Snodgrass; 9. E. Burke; 10. O. Schmidt	1. = V. Richards = K. Koželuh; 3. A. Burke; 4. R. Najuch; 5. R. Ramillon; 6. H. Snodgrass; 7. M. Plaa; 8. H. Kinsey; 9. Jo. Koželuh; 10. H. Richter

Combined
Ray Bowers	Bernard Brown (Brooklyn Times-Union)
1. H. Cochet; 2. R. Lacoste; 3. J. Borotra; 4. B. Tilden; 5. K. Koželuh; 6. F. Hunter; 7. G. Lott; 8. V. Richards	1. H. Cochet; 2. K. Koželuh; 3. V. Richards; 4. B. Tilden; 5. J. Borotra; 6. F. Hunter; 7. G. Lott; 8. H. Kinsey; 9. J. Doeg; 10. U. De Morpurgo

=== 1930 ===
Amateur
A. Wallis Myers	Pierre Gillou	Didier Poulain	Bill Tilden
1. H. Cochet; 2. B. Tilden; 3. J. Borotra; 4. J. Doeg; 5. F. Shields; 6. W. Allison; 7. G. Lott; 8. U. De Morpurgo; 9. C. Boussus; 10. B. Austin	1. H. Cochet; 2. B. Tilden; 3. J. Borotra; 4. J. Doeg; 5. W. Allison; 6. G. Lott; 7. U. De Morpurgo; 8. F. Shields; 9. C. Boussus; 10. T. Harada	1. H. Cochet; 2. B. Tilden; 3. J. Borotra; 4. J. Doeg; 5. F. Shields; 6. W. Allison; 7. G. Lott; 8. U. De Morpurgo; 9. C. Boussus; 10. B. Bell	1. J. Borotra; 2. H. Cochet; 3. W. Allison; 4. J. Doeg; 5. G. Lott; 6. H. Timmer; 7. U. De Morpurgo; 8. G. L. Rogers; 9. H. Hopman; 10. E. Moon; (didn't rank himself)

Pro
Ray Bowers	Bernard Brown
1. V. Richards; 2. K. Koželuh; 3. H. Snodgrass; 4. R. Najuch; 5. A. Burke; 6. R. Ramillon; 7. H. Kinsey; 8. D Maskell	1. K. Koželuh; 2. V. Richards; 3. H. Kinsey; 4. H. Snodgrass; 5. R. Najuch; 6. D Maskell; 7. P. Heston; 8. A. Burke; 9. M. Plaa; 10. N. Craig

Combined
Ray Bowers
1. H. Cochet
2. B. Tilden
3. V. Richards
4. K. Koželuh
5. J. Borotra
6. J. Doeg
7. F. Shields
8. W. Allison

=== 1931 ===
Amateur
A. Wallis Myers	Stanley Doust	Pierre Gillou	Didier Poulain	Bill Tilden	Noel Dickson (Melbourne Herald)	"Service" (Western Mail)	Sport magazine (Zurich)
1. H. Cochet; 2. B. Austin; 3. E. Vines; 4. F. Perry; 5. F. Shields; 6. S. Wood; 7. J. Borotra; 8. G. Lott; 9. J. Sato; 10. J. Van Ryn	1. H. Cochet; 2. B. Austin; 3. E. Vines; 4. F. Perry; 5. F. Shields; 6. J. Borotra; 7. J. Sato; 8. J. Van Ryn; 9. V. Kirby; 10. S. Wood	1. H. Cochet; 2. E. Vines; 3. B. Austin; 4. F. Shields; 5. F. Perry; 6. J. Borotra; 7. G. Lott; 8. J. Doeg; 9. S. Wood; 10. J. Sato	1. H. Cochet; 2. E. Vines; 3. F. Perry; 4. B. Austin; 5. F. Shields; 6. S. Wood; 7. J. Borotra; 8. J. Sato; 9. J. Van Ryn; 10. G. Lott	1. H. Cochet; 2. B. Austin; 3. E. Vines; 4. F. Perry; 5. F. Shields; 6. J. Borotra; 7. G. Lott; 8. S. Wood; 9. R. Menzel; 10. J. Van Ryn	1. H. Cochet; 2. F. Shields; 3. F. Perry; 4. E. Vines; 5. B. Austin; 6. G. Lott; 7. S. Wood; 8. J. Borotra; 9. P. Hughes; 10. J. Van Ryn	1. H. Cochet; 2. J. Borotra; 3. J. Doeg; 4. F. Shields; 5. B. Austin; 6. W. Allison; 7. F. Perry; 8. S. Wood; 9. J. Sato; 10. C. Boussus	1. H. Cochet; 2. B. Austin; 3. E. Vines; 4. G. Lott; 5. F. Shields; 6. F. Perry; 7. J. Borotra; 8. S. Wood; 9. J. Sato; 10. J. Van Ryn

Pro
Ray Bowers	George Agutter	Bill Tilden	PLTA (Note: U.S. Professional Lawn Tennis Association) (U.S.-only)
1. B. Tilden; 2. K. Koželuh; 3. V. Richards; 4. H. Nüsslein; 5. A. Burke; 6. H. Kinsey; 7. F. Hunter; 8. E. Paré	1. B. Tilden; 2. V. Richards; 3. K. Koželuh; 4. H. Nüsslein; 5. H. Snodgrass; 6. A. Burke; 7. H. Kinsey; 8. M. Plaa; 9. E. Paré	1. B. Tilden; 2. H. Nüsslein; 3. V. Richards; 4. K. Koželuh; 5. F. Hunter; 6. A. Burke; 7. H. Kinsey; 8. M. Plaa; 9. R. Najuch; 10. E. Paré	1. B. Tilden; 2. V. Richards; 3. H. Kinsey; 4. F. Hunter; 5. E. Paré; 6. P. Heston; 7. C. Wood; 8. R. Seller; 9. J. Basil Maguire; 10. J. Cardegna

Combined
Ray Bowers	Bernard Brown
1. B. Tilden; 2. H. Cochet; 3. B. Austin; 4. E. Vines; 5. F. Perry; 6. K. Koželuh; 7. V. Richards; 8. F. Shields	1. B. Tilden; 2. H. Cochet; 3. V. Richards; 4. E. Vines; 5. K. Koželuh; 6. B. Austin; 7. F. Perry; 8. F. Shields; 9. J. Borotra; 10. G. Lott

=== 1932 ===
Amateur
A. Wallis Myers	Pierre Gillou	F. Gordon Lowe	Bernard Brown	Jean Borotra	Ellsworth Vines
1. E. Vines; 2. H. Cochet; 3. J. Borotra; 4. W. Allison; 5. C. Sutter; 6. D. Prenn; 7. F. Perry; 8. G. von Cramm; 9. B. Austin; 10. J. Crawford	1. E. Vines; 2. H. Cochet; 3. J. Borotra; 4. C. Sutter; 5. W. Allison; 6. B. Austin; 7. D. Prenn; 8. G. von Cramm; 9. F. Perry; 10. J. Crawford	1. E. Vines; 2. J. Borotra; 3. H. Cochet; 4. W. Allison; 5. C. Sutter; 6. D. Prenn; 7. J. Crawford; 8. S. Wood; 9. G. von Cramm; 10. B. Austin	1. E. Vines; 2. H. Cochet; 3. J. Borotra; 4. W. Allison; 5. C. Sutter; 6. D. Prenn; 7. G. von Cramm; 8. J. Sato; 9. G. de Stefani; 10. S. Wood	1. E. Vines; 2. H. Cochet; 3. W. Allison; 4. C. Sutter; 5. D. Prenn; 6. F. Perry; 7. G. von Cramm; 8. B. Austin; 9. J. Crawford; (didn't rank himself.)	1. E. Vines; 2. H. Cochet; 3. J. Borotra; 4. W. Allison; 5. D. Prenn; 6. S. Wood; 7. C. Sutter; 8. F. Perry; 9. J. Crawford; 10. G. von Cramm

Pro
Ray Bowers	Bill Tilden
1. B. Tilden; 2. K. Koželuh; 3. M. Plaa; 4. H. Nüsslein; 5. A. Burke; 6. R. Najuch; 7. V. Richards; 8. = B. Barnes = E. Paré	1. M. Plaa; 2. B. Tilden; 3. H. Nüsslein; 4. K. Koželuh; 5. = A. Burke = B. Barnes = R. Najuch; 8. R. Ramillon; 9. V. Richards; 10. E. Paré

Combined
Ray Bowers	Ellsworth Vines
1. E. Vines; 2. B. Tilden; 3. H. Cochet; 4. K. Koželuh; 5. J. Borotra; 6. M. Plaa; 7. W. Allison; 8. H. Nüsslein	1. H. Cochet; 2. W. Allison; 3. J. Borotra; 4. J. Crawford; 5. F. Perry; 6. C. Sutter; 7. B. Tilden; 8. K. Koželuh; 9. D. Prenn; 10. B. Austin; (didn't rank himself)

=== 1933 ===
Amateur
A. Wallis Myers	Pierre Gillou	Didier Poulain	Bernard Brown	Harry Hopman (Melbourne Herald)	John R. Tunis (The Literary Digest)	Alfred Chave (Brisbane Telegraph)	"Set" (The West Australian)	Ellsworth Vines
1. J. Crawford; 2. F. Perry; 3. J. Sato; 4. B. Austin; 5. E. Vines; 6. H. Cochet; 7. F. Shields; 8. S. Wood; 9. G. von Cramm; 10. L. Stoefen	1. J. Crawford; 2. F. Perry; 3. E. Vines; 4. H. Cochet; 5. B. Austin; 6. J. Sato; 7. F. Shields; 8. G. von Cramm; 9. L. Stoefen; 10. R. Menzel	1. J. Crawford; 2. F. Perry; 3. H. Cochet; 4. E. Vines; 5. B. Austin; 6. J. Sato; 7. F. Shields; 8. L. Stoefen; 9. = G. von Cramm = R. Menzel = R. Nunoi	1. J. Crawford; 2. F. Perry; 3. H. Cochet; 4. B. Austin; 5. F. Shields; 6. E. Vines; 7. S. Wood; 8. L. Stoefen; 9. R. Nunoi; 10. G. Mangin	1. J. Crawford; 2. F. Perry; 3. B. Austin; 4. J. Sato; 5. E. Vines; 6. H. Cochet; 7. F. Shields; 8. G. von Cramm; 9. R. Nunoi; 10. L. Stoefen	1. J. Crawford; 2. F. Perry; 3. H. Cochet; 4. J. Sato; 5. E. Vines; 6. B. Austin; 7. F. Shields; 8. L. Stoefen; 9. S. Wood; 10. G. Mangin	1. J. Crawford; 2. F. Perry; 3. J. Sato; 4. B. Austin; 5. E. Vines; 6. H. Cochet; 7. G. von Cramm; 8. L. Stoefen; 9. R. Nunoi; 10. H. Lee	1. J. Crawford; 2. F. Perry; 3. H. Cochet; 4. E. Vines; 5. J. Sato; 6. B. Austin; 7. L. Stoefen; 8. F. Shields; 9. H. Lee; 10. R. Menzel	1. J. Crawford; 2. F. Perry; 3. B. Austin; 4. F. Shields; 5. J. Sato; 6. S. Wood; 7. L. Stoefen; 8. G. von Cramm; 9. R. Menzel; 10. E. Maier

Pro
Ray Bowers	Ellsworth Vines	Albert Burke	Bill Tilden	PLTA (Note: "Belief and opinion ranking" of the players' relative playing strength. Record-based ranking from the national and Florida championships was: V. Richards, F. Hunter, R. Murray, P. Heston, C. Wood, J. Basil Maguire, T. Rericha, H. Peterson, J. Cardegna, T. Iannicelli.) (U.S.-only)
1. H. Nüsslein; 2. B. Tilden; 3. K. Koželuh; 4. V. Richards; 5. H. Cochet; 6. B. Barnes; 7. R. Najuch; 8. R. Ramillon; 9. P. Facondi; 10. E. Paré	1. B. Tilden; 2. H. Cochet; 3. K. Koželuh; 4. V. Richards; 5. M. Plaa; 6. H. Nüsslein; 7. F. Hunter; 8. D Maskell; 9. B. Barnes; 10. A. Burke	1. H. Nüsslein; 2. B. Tilden; 3. K. Koželuh; 4. M. Plaa; 5. R. Ramillon; 6. B. Barnes; 7. R. Najuch; 8. V. Richards; 9. E. Paré; 10. C. Wood	1. H. Nüsslein; 2. K. Koželuh; 3. B. Barnes; 4. M. Plaa; 5. V. Richards; 6. R. Ramillon; 7. R. Najuch; 8. E. Paré; 9. F. Hunter; 10. A. Burke; (didn't rank himself)	1. B. Tilden; 2. V. Richards; 3. B. Barnes; 4. E. Paré; 5. H. Snodgrass; 6. H. Kinsey; 7. F. Hunter; 8. P. Heston; 9. C. Wood; 10. R. Lindley Murray

Combined
Ray Bowers
1. J. Crawford
2. F. Perry
3. H. Nüsslein
4. B. Tilden
5. K. Koželuh
6. J. Sato
7. B. Austin
8. E. Vines

=== 1934 ===
Amateur
A. Wallis Myers	Pierre Gillou	Bill Tilden (Note: He ranked Von Cramm first on ability.)	Bernard Brown	Harry Hopman	John R. Tunis	Ned Potter (American Lawn Tennis)	G. H. McElhone (The Sydney Morning Herald)	R. O. Cummings (The Courier-Mail)	J. Brookes Fenno, Jr. (The Literary Digest)
1. F. Perry; 2. J. Crawford; 3. G. von Cramm; 4. B. Austin; 5. W. Allison; 6. S. Wood; 7. R. Menzel; 8. F. Shields; 9. G. de Stefani; 10. C. Boussus	1. F. Perry; 2. J. Crawford; 3. G. von Cramm; 4. B. Austin; 5. W. Allison; 6. S. Wood; 7. R. Menzel; 8. F. Shields; 9. C. Boussus; 10. G. de Stefani	1. F. Perry; 2. B. Austin; 3. G. von Cramm; 4. J. Crawford; 5. S. Wood; 6. F. Shields; 7. V. McGrath; 8. C. Boussus; 9. R. Menzel; 10. = A. Merlin = G. de Stefani	1. F. Perry; 2. B. Austin; 3. J. Crawford; 4. W. Allison; 5. S. Wood; 6. G. von Cramm; 7. L. Stoefen; 8. R. Menzel; 9. V. Kirby; 10. F. Shields	1. F. Perry; 2. G. von Cramm; 3. J. Crawford; 4. B. Austin; 5. W. Allison; 6. D. Budge; 7. R. Menzel; 8. V. McGrath; 9. S. Wood; 10. C. Boussus	1. F. Perry; 2. G. von Cramm; 3. J. Crawford; 4. S. Wood; 5. W. Allison; 6. B. Austin; 7. A. Merlin; 8. G. de Stefani; 9. F. Shields; 10. R. Menzel	1. F. Perry; 2. G. von Cramm; 3. B. Austin; 4. J. Crawford; 5. W. Allison; 6. F. Shields; 7. R. Menzel; 8. V. Kirby; 9. S. Wood; 10. G. de Stefani	1. F. Perry; 2. G. von Cramm; 3. J. Crawford; 4. B. Austin; 5. R. Menzel; 6. S. Wood; 7. F. Shields; 8. G. de Stefani; 9. V. McGrath; 10. C. Boussus	1. F. Perry; 2. J. Crawford; 3. G. von Cramm; 4. B. Austin; 5. R. Menzel; 6. S. Wood; 7. G. de Stefani; 8. V. Kirby; 9. F. Shields; 10. V. McGrath	1. F. Perry; 2. G. von Cramm; 3. J. Crawford; 4. B. Austin; 5. W. Allison; 6. G. de Stefani; 7. R. Menzel; 8. S. Wood; 9. V. Kirby; 10. F. Shields

Pro
Ray Bowers	John R. Tunis
1. E. Vines; 2. H. Nüsslein; 3. B. Tilden; 4. K. Koželuh; 5. M. Plaa; 6. H. Cochet; 7. B. Barnes; 8. R. Ramillon; 9. V. Richards; 10. K. Gledhill	1. H. Nüsslein; 2. E. Vines; 3. B. Tilden; 4. K. Koželuh; 5. M. Plaa; 6. H. Cochet; 7. R. Ramillon; 8. V. Richards; 9. B. Barnes; 10. D Maskell

Combined
Ray Bowers	Pierre Gillou	Tennis (Italian newspaper)	Bill Tilden & Ellsworth Vines
1. F. Perry; 2. E. Vines; 3. J. Crawford; 4. G. von Cramm; 5. H. Nüsslein; 6. B. Tilden; 7. B. Austin; 8. W. Allison	1. E. Vines; 2. F. Perry; 3. J. Crawford; 4. G. von Cramm; 5. B. Tilden; 6. B. Austin; 7. H. Nüsslein; 8. W. Allison; 9. S. Wood; 10. H. Cochet	1. E. Vines; 2. B. Tilden; 3. F. Perry; 4. J. Crawford; 5. G. von Cramm; 6. H. Nüsslein; 7. K. Koželuh; 8. M. Plaa; 9. H. Cochet; 10. B. Austin	1. E. Vines; 2. B. Tilden; 3. F. Perry; 4. J. Crawford; 5. H. Nüsslein; 6. H. Cochet; 7. B. Austin; 8. M. Plaa; 9. B. Barnes; 10. K. Koželuh

=== 1935 ===
Amateur
A. Wallis Myers	S. Wallis Merrihew	Pierre Gillou	Harry Hopman	Ned Potter	G. H. McElhone	The Times	"Forehand" (Ashburton Guardian)
1. F. Perry; 2. J. Crawford; 3. G. von Cramm; 4. W. Allison; 5. B. Austin; 6. D. Budge; 7. F. Shields; 8. V. McGrath; 9. C. Boussus; 10. S. Wood	1. F. Perry; 2. G. von Cramm; 3. J. Crawford; 4. B. Austin; 5. W. Allison; 6. D. Budge; 7. B. Grant; 8. F. Shields; 9. S. Wood; 10. R. Menzel	1. F. Perry; 2. G. von Cramm; 3. J. Crawford; 4. W. Allison; 5. B. Austin; 6. D. Budge; 7. S. Wood; 8. B. Grant; 9. R. Menzel; 10. G. Palmieri	1. F. Perry; 2. G. von Cramm; 3. J. Crawford; 4. B. Austin; 5. W. Allison; 6. D. Budge; 7. R. Menzel; 8. V. McGrath; 9. C. Boussus; 10. S. Wood	1. F. Perry; 2. G. von Cramm; 3. J. Crawford; 4. W. Allison; 5. B. Austin; 6. D. Budge; 7. B. Grant; 8. R. Menzel; 9. F. Shields; 10. J. Borotra	1. F. Perry; 2. G. von Cramm; 3. J. Crawford; 4. B. Austin; 5. = D. Budge = W. Allison; 7. R. Menzel; 8. V. McGrath; 9. S. Wood; 10. C. Boussus	1. F. Perry; 2. G. von Cramm; 3. J. Crawford; 4. B. Austin; 5. W. Allison; 6. D. Budge; 7. R. Menzel; 8. S. Wood; 9. V. McGrath; 10. A. Quist	1. F. Perry; 2. G. von Cramm; 3. J. Crawford; 4. S. Wood; 5. D. Budge; 6. B. Austin; 7. W. Allison; 8. R. Menzel; 9. C. Boussus; 10. A. Merlin

Pro
Ray Bowers
1. E. Vines
2. B. Tilden
3. H. Nüsslein
4. K. Koželuh
5. M. Plaa
6. L. Stoefen
7. R. Ramillon
8. = G. Lott
  = B. Barnes

Combined
Ray Bowers	Henri Cochet
1. = E. Vines = F. Perry; 3. J. Crawford; 4. G. von Cramm; 5. B. Tilden; 6. H. Nüsslein; 7. W. Allison; 8. B. Austin	1. E. Vines; 2. B. Tilden; 3. F. Perry; 4. J. Crawford; 5. H. Nüsslein; 6. = W. Allison = B. Austin

=== 1936 ===
Amateur
A. Wallis Myers	"Austral" (R. M. Kidston)	Pierre Gillou	Bill Tilden	Harry Hopman	Ned Potter	G. H. McElhone	The Times	Mervyn Weston (The Australasian)	Fred Perry	Jack Crawford
1. F. Perry; 2. G. von Cramm; 3. D. Budge; 4. A. Quist; 5. B. Austin; 6. J. Crawford; 7. W. Allison; 8. B. Grant; 9. H. Henkel; 10. V. McGrath	1. F. Perry; 2. G. von Cramm; 3. D. Budge; 4. A. Quist; 5. B. Austin; 6. J. Crawford; 7. W. Allison; 8. B. Grant; 9. H. Henkel; 10. E. Maier	1. F. Perry; 2. D. Budge; 3. G. von Cramm; 4. A. Quist; 5. B. Austin; 6. J. Crawford; 7. B. Grant; 8. F. Parker; 9. G. Mangin; 10. V. McGrath	1. F. Perry; 2. G. von Cramm; 3. D. Budge; 4. A. Quist; 5. B. Austin; 6. J. Crawford; 7. V. McGrath; 8. B. Grant; 9. H. Henkel; 10. J. Palada	1. F. Perry; 2. G. von Cramm; 3. D. Budge; 4. A. Quist; 5. B. Austin; 6. J. Crawford; 7. B. Grant; 8. W. Allison; 9. H. Henkel; 10. V. McGrath	1. F. Perry; 2. G. von Cramm; 3. D. Budge; 4. A. Quist; 5. B. Austin; 6. J. Crawford; 7. B. Grant; 8. W. Allison; 9. F. Parker; 10. V. McGrath	1. F. Perry; 2. G. von Cramm; 3. D. Budge; 4. A. Quist; 5. B. Austin; 6. J. Crawford; 7. B. Grant; 8. C. Boussus; 9. W. Allison; 10. = V. McGrath = F. Parker	1. F. Perry; 2. G. von Cramm; 3. D. Budge; 4. A. Quist; 5. B. Austin; 6. J. Crawford; 7. B. Grant; 8. J. Borotra; 9. W. Allison; 10. C. Boussus	1. F. Perry; 2. D. Budge; 3. G. von Cramm; 4. A. Quist; 5. B. Austin; 6. J. Crawford; 7. B. Grant; 8. H. Henkel; 9. W. Allison; 10. V. McGrath	1. G. von Cramm; 2. D. Budge; 3. A. Quist; 4. B. Austin; 5. J. Crawford; 6. B. Grant; 7. W. Allison; 8. V. McGrath; 9. R. Menzel; 10. = F. Parker = C. Boussus = H. Henkel; (didn't rank himself)	1. F. Perry; 2. = D. Budge = G. von Cramm; 4. A. Quist; 5. B. Austin; 6. J. Crawford; 7. B. Grant; 8. V. McGrath; 9. W. Allison; 10. H. Henkel

Pro
Ray Bowers	Bill Tilden	Fred Perry
1. E. Vines; 2. H. Nüsslein; 3. B. Tilden; 4. H. Cochet; 5. L. Stoefen; 6. M. Plaa; 7. R. Ramillon; 8. G. Lott	1. E. Vines; 2. H. Nüsslein; 3. B. Tilden; 4. H. Cochet; 5. = L. Stoefen = R. Ramillon = M. Plaa; 8. B. Barnes; 9. A. Burke; 10. H. Vissault	1. E. Vines; 2. H. Nüsslein; 3. B. Tilden; 4. H. Cochet; 5. B. Barnes; 6. R. Ramillon; 7. M. Plaa; 8. G. Lott; 9. L. Stoefen; 10. V. Richards

Combined
Ray Bowers	Bill Tilden	Robert Murray (Sports Illustrated)
1. F. Perry; 2. E. Vines; 3. G. von Cramm; 4. H. Nüsslein; 5. D. Budge; 6. B. Tilden; 7. A. Quist; 8. H. Cochet	1. E. Vines; 2. H. Nüsslein; 3. F. Perry; 4. G. von Cramm; 5. H. Cochet; 6. D. Budge; 7. L. Stoefen; 8. R. Ramillon; 9. M. Plaa; 10. A. Quist	1. E. Vines; 2. F. Perry; 3. G. von Cramm; 4. H. Nüsslein; 5. D. Budge; 6. B. Tilden; 7. B. Austin; 8. A. Quist; 9. J. Crawford; 10. H. Cochet

=== 1937 ===
Amateur
A. Wallis Myers	Pierre Gillou	Harry Hopman	Alfred Chave	Ned Potter	The Times	Mervyn Weston	Pierre Goldschmidt (L'Auto)
1. D. Budge; 2. G. von Cramm; 3. H. Henkel; 4. B. Austin; 5. B. Riggs; 6. B. Grant; 7. J. Crawford; 8. R. Menzel; 9. F. Parker; 10. C. Hare	1. D. Budge; 2. G. von Cramm; 3. B. Austin; 4. H. Henkel; 5. B. Riggs; 6. F. Parker; 7. B. Grant; 8. J. Crawford; 9. R. Menzel; 10. V. McGrath	1. D. Budge; 2. G. von Cramm; 3. H. Henkel; 4. B. Austin; 5. F. Parker; 6. B. Grant; 7. V. McGrath; 8. J. Bromwich; 9. B. Riggs; 10. C. Hare	1. D. Budge; 2. G. von Cramm; 3. H. Henkel; 4. B. Austin; 5. F. Parker; 6. B. Grant; 7. V. McGrath; 8. J. Bromwich; 9. R. Menzel; 10. L. Hecht	1. D. Budge; 2. G. von Cramm; 3. B. Austin; 4. B. Riggs; 5. F. Parker; 6. H. Henkel; 7. B. Grant; 8. J. Hunt; 9. J. Yamagishi; 10. V. McGrath	1. D. Budge; 2. G. von Cramm; 3. B. Austin; 4. H. Henkel; 5. F. Parker; 6. B. Grant; 7. V. McGrath; 8. J. Bromwich; 9. J. Crawford; 10. B. Riggs	1. D. Budge; 2. G. von Cramm; 3. B. Austin; 4. B. Riggs; 5. F. Parker; 6. H. Henkel; 7. B. Grant; 8. V. McGrath; 9. J. Bromwich; 10. J. Crawford	1. D. Budge; 2. G. von Cramm; 3. H. Henkel; 4. B. Austin; 5. A. Quist; 6. F. Parker; 7. B. Grant; 8. J. Crawford; 9. R. Menzel; 10. L. Hecht

Pro
Ray Bowers
1. = F. Perry
  = E. Vines
3. H. Nüsslein
4. B. Tilden
5. R. Ramillon
6. H. Cochet
7. L. Stoefen
8. = B. Barnes
  = K. Koželuh

Combined
Ray Bowers	Pierre Goldschmidt	Sports Illustrated
1. = F. Perry = E. Vines = D. Budge; 4. = H. Nüsslein = G. von Cramm; 6. H. Henkel; 7. B. Austin; 8. B. Tilden	1. D. Budge; 2. E. Vines; 3. F. Perry; 4. G. von Cramm; 5. H. Nüsslein; 6. B. Tilden; 7. H. Henkel; 8. B. Austin; 9. A. Quist; 10. = R. Ramillon = H. Cochet	1. D. Budge; 2. F. Perry; 3. E. Vines; 4. G. von Cramm; 5. H. Nüsslein; 6. B. Austin; 7. B. Riggs; 8. B. Tilden; 9. L. Stoefen; 10. F. Parker

=== 1938 ===
- Last Wallis Myers ranking before his death.

Amateur
A. Wallis Myers	Pierre Gillou	F. Gordon Lowe	Alfred Chave	Ned Potter	G. H. McElhone	The Times	Mervyn Weston	Pierre Goldschmidt	"International" (The Referee)	Jack Crawford	Don Budge
1. D. Budge; 2. B. Austin; 3. J. Bromwich; 4. B. Riggs; 5. S. Wood; 6. A. Quist; 7. R. Menzel; 8. J. Yamagishi; 9. G. Mako; 10. F. Punčec	1. D. Budge; 2. J. Bromwich; 3. B. Riggs; 4. B. Austin; 5. A. Quist; 6. G. Mako; 7. S. Wood; 8. J. Hunt; 9. R. Menzel; 10. F. Punčec	1. D. Budge; 2. J. Bromwich; 3. B. Austin; 4. B. Riggs; 5. F. Punčec; 6. A. Quist; 7. H. Henkel; 8. G. Mako; 9. S. Wood; 10. R. Menzel	1. D. Budge; 2. J. Bromwich; 3. B. Austin; 4. B. Riggs; 5. G. Mako; 6. A. Quist; 7. S. Wood; 8. R. Menzel; 9. H. Henkel; 10. F. Punčec	1. D. Budge; 2. B. Austin; 3. J. Bromwich; 4. B. Riggs; 5. A. Quist; 6. G. Mako; 7. J. Yamagishi; 8. S. Wood; 9. V. McGrath; 10. S.-K. Kho	1. D. Budge; 2. J. Bromwich; 3. B. Riggs; 4. B. Austin; 5. A. Quist; 6. G. Mako; 7. R. Menzel; 8. F. Punčec; 9. B. Grant; 10. H. Henkel	1. D. Budge; 2. J. Bromwich; 3. B. Austin; 4. B. Riggs; 5. A. Quist; 6. F. Punčec; 7. R. Menzel; 8. G. Mako; 9. S. Wood; 10. H. Henkel	1. D. Budge; 2. J. Bromwich; 3. B. Austin; 4. B. Riggs; 5. A. Quist; 6. J. Yamagishi; 7. S. Wood; 8. G. Mako; 9. F. Punčec; 10. R. Menzel	1. D. Budge; 2. J. Bromwich; 3. B. Riggs; 4. S. Wood; 5. J. Hunt; 6. B. Austin; 7. G. Mako; 8. A. Quist; 9. R. Menzel; 10. F. Punčec	1. D. Budge; 2. J. Bromwich; 3. = B. Riggs = A. Quist; 5. B. Austin; 6. G. Mako; 7. R. Menzel; 8. F. Punčec; 9. H. Hopman; 10. S. Wood	1. D. Budge; 2. J. Bromwich; 3. A. Quist; 4. B. Riggs; 5. B. Austin; 6. J. Yamagishi; 7. S. Wood; 8. B. Grant; 9. R. Menzel; 10. G. Mako	1. B. Austin; 2. J. Bromwich; 3. B. Riggs; 4. R. Menzel; 5. S. Wood; 6. G. Mako; 7. F. Cejnar; 8. A. Quist; 9. H. Henkel; 10. B. Grant; (didn't rank himself)

Pro
Ray Bowers
1. E. Vines
2. = F. Perry
  = H. Nüsslein
4. B. Tilden
5. H. Cochet
6. R. Ramillon
7. B. Barnes
8. K. Koželuh
9. W. Senior

Combined
Ray Bowers
1. D. Budge
2. E. Vines
3. = F. Perry
  = H. Nüsslein
5. B. Austin
6. J. Bromwich
7. B. Riggs
8. B. Tilden

=== 1939 ===
Amateur
American Lawn Tennis	Pierre Gillou	F. Gordon Lowe	Alfred Chave	Ned Potter (Note: World Tennis lists Austin at No. 10 for this ranking.)	G. H. McElhone	The Times
1. B. Riggs; 2. J. Bromwich; 3. A. Quist; 4. F. Parker; 5. F. Punčec; 6. W. Van Horn; 7. J. Hunt; 8. D. McNeill; 9. W. Sabin; 10. E. Cooke	1. B. Riggs; 2. J. Bromwich; 3. F. Parker; 4. A. Quist; 5. W. Van Horn; 6. W. Sabin; 7. D. McNeill; 8. F. Punčec; 9. J. Hunt; 10. E. Cooke	1. B. Riggs; 2. J. Bromwich; 3. A. Quist; 4. F. Punčec; 5. F. Parker; 6. H. Henkel; 7. D. McNeill; 8. E. Cooke; 9. W. Van Horn; 10. J. Hunt	1. B. Riggs; 2. A. Quist; 3. J. Bromwich; 4. F. Parker; 5. D. McNeill; 6. E. Cooke; 7. F. Punčec; 8. W. Sabin; 9. W. Van Horn; 10. H. Henkel	1. B. Riggs; 2. J. Bromwich; 3. A. Quist; 4. F. Parker; 5. W. Van Horn; 6. F. Punčec; 7. J. Hunt; 8. D. McNeill; 9. W. Sabin; 10. E. Cooke	1. B. Riggs; 2. J. Bromwich; 3. F. Parker; 4. A. Quist; 5. D. McNeill; 6. E. Cooke; 7. F. Punčec; 8. W. Van Horn; 9. W. Sabin; 10. H. Henkel	1. B. Riggs; 2. J. Bromwich; 3. A. Quist; 4. D. McNeill; 5. F. Punčec; 6. E. Cooke; 7. H. Henkel; 8. B. Austin; 9. W. Van Horn; 10. F. Kukuljević

Pro
Ray Bowers	Alfred Chave
1. D. Budge; 2. E. Vines; 3. H. Nüsslein; 4. F. Perry; 5. B. Tilden; 6. L. Stoefen; 7. H. Cochet; 8. D. Skeen	1. D. Budge; 2. E. Vines; 3. F. Perry; 4. H. Nüsslein; 5. L. Stoefen; 6. H. Cochet; 7. B. Tilden

Combined
Ray Bowers	Didier Poulain
1. D. Budge; 2. E. Vines; 3. H. Nüsslein; 4. F. Perry; 5. B. Riggs; 6. J. Bromwich; 7. A. Quist; 8. B. Tilden	1. D. Budge; 2. E. Vines; 3. = L. Stoefen = G. von Cramm; 5. F. Perry; 6. H. Nüsslein; 7. B. Tilden; 8. H. Cochet; 9. R. Ramillon; 10. J. Bromwich

=== 1940 ===
Amateur
USNLTA (Note: United States National Lawn Tennis Association)
(U.S.-only)
1. W. D. McNeill
2. B. Riggs
3. F. Kovacs
4. J. Hunt
5. F. Parker
6. J. Kramer
7. G. Mulloy
8. H. Prusoff
9. E. Cooke
10. T. Schroeder

Pro
Ray Bowers
1. D. Budge
2. F. Perry
3. J. Nogrady
4. B. Gorchakoff
5. B. Barnes
6. L. Stoefen
7. D. Skeen
8. B. Tilden

Combined
Ray Bowers
1. D. Budge
2. F. Perry
3. W. D. McNeill
4. B. Riggs

=== 1941 ===
Amateur
USNLTA
(U.S.-only)
1. B. Riggs
2. F. Kovacs
3. F. Parker
4. W. D. McNeill
5. T. Schroeder
6. W. Sabin
7. G. Mulloy
8. B. M. Grant
9. J. Kramer
10. B. Talbert

Pro
Ray Bowers
1. F. Perry
2. D. Skeen
3. D. Budge
4. B. Tilden
5. J. Whalen
6. J. Faunce
7. K. Gledhill
8. = B. Barnes
  = W. Senior

Combined
Ray Bowers
1. = B. Riggs
  = F. Perry
3. F. Kovacs
4. = F. Parker
  = D. Skeen
6. D. Budge

=== 1942 ===
Amateur
USNLTA
(U.S.-only)
1. T. Schroeder
2. F. Parker
3. P. Segura
4. G. Mulloy
5. B. Talbert
6. S. Wood
7. S. Greenberg
8. G. Richards
9. V. Seixas
10. L. Hecht

Pro
Ray Bowers	PLTA (U.S.-only)
1. D. Budge; 2. = W. Sabin = B. Riggs; 4. F. Kovacs; 5. F. Perry; 6. D. Skeen; 7. = B. Barnes = W. Van Horn	1. D. Budge; 2. B. Riggs; 3. W. Sabin; 4. F. Kovacs; 5. B. Barnes; 6. J. Nogrady; 7. R. Harman; 8. H. Peterson; 9. J. Faunce; 10. F. Rericha

Combined
Ray Bowers
1. D. Budge
2. = W. Sabin
  = B. Riggs
4. F. Kovacs
5. F. Perry
6. T. Schroeder
7. F. Parker
8. D. Skeen

=== 1943–44 ===
no world rankings (World War II)

=== 1945 ===
Amateur
USNLTA
(U.S.-only)
1. F. Parker
2. B. Talbert
3. P. Segura
4. E. Cooke
5. S. Wood
6. G. Mulloy
7. F. Shields
8. H. Surface
9. S. Greenberg
10. J. McManis

Pro
WPTA (Note: World's Professional Tennis Association)	PLTA (U.S.-only)	Bill Tilden
1. F. Kovacs; 2. W. Van Horn; 3. D. Budge; 4. B. Tilden; 5. B. Riggs; 6. W. Sabin; 7. D. Skeen; 8. K. Koželuh; 9. H. Cochet; 10. D Maskell	1. W. Van Horn; 2. J. Nogrady; 3. B. Tilden; 4. D. Skeen; 5. W. Senior; 6. K. Koželuh; 7. V. Richards; 8. R. Decker; 9. F. Rericha; 10. A. Doyle	1. D. Budge; 2. F. Kovacs; 3. B. Riggs; 4. W. Van Horn; 5. = D. Skeen = K. Koželuh = W. Sabin = V. Richards = B. Barnes = H. Cochet = D Maskell = J. Nogrady = R. Ramillon = J. Faunce = L. Stoefen = B. Tilden

=== 1946 ===
Amateur
Pierre Gillou	Harry Hopman	Ned Potter	Jean Samazeuilh
1. J. Kramer; 2. T. Schroeder; 3. J. Drobný; 4. Y. Petra; 5. M. Bernard; 6. J. Bromwich; 7. T. Brown; 8. G. Mulloy; 9. F. Parker; 10. G. Brown	1. J. Kramer; 2. T. Schroeder; 3. J. Bromwich; 4. F. Parker; 5. D. Pails; 6. G. Mulloy; 7. T. Brown; 8. Y. Petra; 9. M. Bernard; 10. J. Drobný	1. J. Kramer; 2. F. Parker; 3. J. Bromwich; 4. D. Pails; 5. G. Mulloy; 6. G. Brown; 7. T. Schroeder; 8. T. Brown; 9. Y. Petra; 10. M. Bernard	1. J. Kramer; 2. M. Bernard; 3. J. Drobný; 4. Y. Petra; 5. G. Brown; 6. T. Brown; 7. F. Parker; 8. W. D. McNeill; 9. L. Bergelin; 10. D. Mitić

Pro
PPA (Note: Professional Players' Association)
1. B. Riggs
2. D. Budge
3. F. Kovacs
4. F. Perry
5. W. Van Horn
6. W. Sabin
7. C. Earn
8. J. Jossi
9. J. Faunce
10. J. March

=== 1947 ===
Amateur
Pierre Gillou	Ned Potter	John Olliff (The Daily Telegraph)
1. J. Kramer; 2. F. Parker; 3. T. Schroeder; 4. J. Bromwich; 5. J. Drobný; 6. D. Pails; 7. T. Brown; 8. B. Patty; 9. J. Asbóth; 10. G. Mulloy	1. J. Kramer; 2. F. Parker; 3. T. Schroeder; 4. J. Bromwich; 5. J. Drobný; 6. D. Pails; 7. P. Segura; 8. T. Brown; 9. G. Mulloy; 10. G. Brown	1. J. Kramer; 2. T. Schroeder; 3. F. Parker; 4. J. Bromwich; 5. J. Drobný; 6. D. Pails; 7. T. Brown; 8. B. Patty; 9. J. Asbóth; 10. G. Mulloy

=== 1948 ===
Amateur
Pierre Gillou	Ned Potter	John Olliff
1. F. Parker; 2. T. Schroeder; 3. P. Gonzales; 4. B. Falkenburg; 5. J. Bromwich; 6. J. Drobný; 7. E. Sturgess; 8. J. Asbóth; 9. B. Talbert; 10. A. Quist	1. P. Gonzales; 2. F. Parker; 3. E. Sturgess; 4. B. Talbert; 5. T. Schroeder; 6. J. Bromwich; 7. J. Asbóth; 8. J. Drobný; 9. B. Falkenburg; 10. L. Bergelin	1. F. Parker; 2. T. Schroeder; 3. P. Gonzales; 4. J. Bromwich; 5. J. Drobný; 6. E. Sturgess; 7. B. Falkenburg; 8. J. Asbóth; 9. L. Bergelin; 10. A. Quist

Pro
PLTA (U.S.-only)	USPTA (U.S.-only)
1. J. Kramer; 2. B. Riggs; 3. = D. Budge = F. Kovacs; 5. W. Van Horn; 6. C. Earn; 7. W. Sabin; 8. E. Cooke; 9. J. Nogrady; 10. R. Stubbs	1. J. Kramer; 2. B. Riggs; 3. D. Budge; 4. W. Van Horn; 5. F. Kovacs; 6. W. Sabin; 7. E. Cooke; 8. A. Doyle; 9. J. March; 10. J. Nogrady

=== 1949 ===
Amateur
Pierre Gillou	Harry Hopman	Ned Potter	John Olliff
1. T. Schroeder; 2. P. Gonzales; 3. F. Parker; 4. B. Talbert; 5. F. Sedgman; 6. J. Drobný; 7. E. Sturgess; 8. G. Mulloy; 9. A. Larsen; 10. J. Bromwich	1. T. Schroeder; 2. P. Gonzales; 3. F. Sedgman; 4. B. Talbert; 5. F. Parker; 6. J. Drobný; 7. E. Sturgess; 8. G. Mulloy; 9. J. Bromwich; 10. B. Sidwell	1. P. Gonzales; 2. T. Schroeder; 3. B. Talbert; 4. F. Parker; 5. F. Sedgman; 6. E. Sturgess; 7. G. Mulloy; 8. J. Drobný; 9. A. Larsen; 10. E. Cochell	1. P. Gonzales; 2. T. Schroeder; 3. B. Talbert; 4. F. Parker; 5. F. Sedgman; 6. E. Sturgess; 7. J. Drobný; 8. B. Patty; 9. G. Mulloy; 10. B. Sidwell

Pro
USPTA (Note: U.S. Professional Tennis Association)
(U.S.-only)
1. B. Riggs
2. D. Budge
3. F. Kovacs
4. W. Van Horn
5. P. Segura
6. C. Earn
7. J. Nogrady
8. J. Evert
9. J. Cushingham
10. E. Cooke

=== 1950 ===
- Last ranking by Olliff before his death.

Amateur
Pierre Gillou	Harry Hopman	Ned Potter	John Olliff
1. B. Patty; 2. F. Sedgman; 3. A. Larsen; 4. J. Drobný; 5. H. Flam; 6. T. Schroeder; 7. E. Sturgess; 8. G. Mulloy; 9. B. Talbert; 10. L. Bergelin	1. F. Sedgman; 2. B. Patty; 3. A. Larsen; 4. J. Drobný; 5. H. Flam; 6. T. Schroeder; 7. E. Sturgess; 8. K. McGregor; 9. L. Bergelin; 10. G. Mulloy	1. F. Sedgman; 2. B. Patty; 3. T. Schroeder; 4. A. Larsen; 5. J. Drobný; 6. H. Flam; 7. E. Sturgess; 8. T. Brown; 9. L. Bergelin; 10. K. McGregor	1. B. Patty; 2. F. Sedgman; 3. A. Larsen; 4. J. Drobný; 5. H. Flam; 6. T. Schroeder; 7. V. Seixas; 8. K. McGregor; 9. B. Talbert; 10. E. Sturgess

Pro
PLTA
(U.S.-only)
1. P. Segura
2. J. Kramer
3. F. Kovacs
4. B. Riggs
5. W. Van Horn
6. F. Parker
7. C. Earn
8. J. Evert
9. J. Nogrady
10. J. Fishbach

=== 1951 ===
Amateur
Pierre Gillou	Harry Hopman	Ned Potter
1. F. Sedgman; 2. D. Savitt; 3. J. Drobný; 4. V. Seixas; 5. T. Trabert; 6. T. Schroeder; 7. K. McGregor; 8. H. Flam; 9. A. Larsen; 10. M. Rose	1. F. Sedgman; 2. D. Savitt; 3. V. Seixas; 4. J. Drobný; 5. K. McGregor; 6. T. Trabert; 7. E. Sturgess; 8. H. Flam; 9. M. Rose; 10. B. Talbert	1. F. Sedgman; 2. J. Drobný; 3. D. Savitt; 4. T. Trabert; 5. V. Seixas; 6. H. Flam; 7. T. Schroeder; 8. M. Rose; 9. K. McGregor; 10. B. Talbert

Pro
PLTA (Note: McCauley lists Parker at No. 6, Earn at No. 7 for this ranking.) (U.S.-only)	PTPA (Note: Professional Tennis Players Association) (U.S.-only)
1. P. Segura; 2. P. Gonzales; 3. F. Kovacs; 4. B. Riggs; 5. W. Van Horn; 6. C. Earn; 7. F. Parker; 8. J. Evert; 9. B. Rogers; 10. J. Rodgers	1. F. Kovacs; 2. P. Segura; 3. P. Gonzales; 4. J. Kramer; 5. D. Budge; 6. F. Parker; 7. B. Riggs; 8. W. Van Horn; 9. C. Earn; 10. B. Rogers

=== 1952 ===
- Last ranking by Gillou before his death.

Amateur
Pierre Gillou	Harry Hopman	Ned Potter (Note: World Tennis lists Savitt at No. 9, Larsen at No. 10 for this ranking.)	Lance Tingay (The Daily Telegraph)
1. F. Sedgman; 2. J. Drobný; 3. K. McGregor; 4. V. Seixas; 5. M. Rose; 6. G. Mulloy; 7. E. Sturgess; 8. A. Larsen; 9. H. Flam; 10. D. Savitt	1. F. Sedgman; 2. J. Drobný; 3. V. Seixas; 4. K. McGregor; 5. M. Rose; 6. G. Mulloy; 7. D. Savitt; 8. A. Larsen; 9. E. Sturgess; 10. F. Gardini	1. F. Sedgman; 2. J. Drobný; 3. K. McGregor; 4. V. Seixas; 5. G. Mulloy; 6. M. Rose; 7. E. Sturgess; 8. D. Savitt; 9. A. Larsen; 10. H. Flam	1. F. Sedgman; 2. J. Drobný; 3. K. McGregor; 4. M. Rose; 5. V. Seixas; 6. H. Flam; 7. G. Mulloy; 8. E. Sturgess; 9. D. Savitt; 10. = K. Rosewall = L. Hoad

Pro
PTPA
(U.S.-only)
1. P. Segura
2. P. Gonzales
3. F. Kovacs
4. D. Budge
5. J. Howard
6. A. Doyle
7. J. Rodgers
8. G. Richey
9. J. March
10. T. Burke

=== 1953 ===
Amateur
Harry Hopman	Ned Potter (Note: Revision of his ranking from November 1953.) (World Tennis)	Lance Tingay	Tennis de France (Philippe Chatrier ed.)	Bill Talbert (Note: Revision of his ranking from November 1953.)	Ham Richardson	Noel Brown (Note: Revision of his ranking from November 1953.)	Hal Burrows (Note: Revision of his ranking from November 1953.)	Gardnar Mulloy	Grant Golden	Tony Trabert (Note: Revision of his ranking from November 1953.)	Vic Seixas
1. L. Hoad; 2. T. Trabert; 3. K. Rosewall; 4. V. Seixas; 5. J. Drobný; 6. K. Nielsen; 7. R. Hartwig; 8. M. Rose; 9. S. Davidson; 10. B. Patty	1. T. Trabert; 2. L. Hoad; 3. K. Rosewall; 4. V. Seixas; 5. J. Drobný; 6. B. Patty; 7. K. Nielsen; 8. A. Larsen; 9. M. Rose; 10. R. Hartwig	1. T. Trabert; 2. K. Rosewall; 3. V. Seixas; 4. J. Drobný; 5. L. Hoad; 6. M. Rose; 7. K. Nielsen; 8. B. Patty; 9. S. Davidson; 10. E. Morea	1. L. Hoad; 2. T. Trabert; 3. K. Rosewall; 4. V. Seixas; 5. J. Drobný; 6. B. Patty; 7. M. Rose; 8. A. Larsen; 9. K. Nielsen; 10. S. Davidson	1. T. Trabert; 2. L. Hoad; 3. K. Rosewall; 4. V. Seixas; 5. J. Drobný; 6. M. Rose; 7. K. Nielsen; 8. A. Larsen; 9. S. Davidson; 10. G. Mulloy	1. T. Trabert; 2. V. Seixas; 3. K. Rosewall; 4. J. Drobný; 5. L. Hoad; 6. M. Rose; 7. K. Nielsen; 8. S. Davidson; 9. G. Mulloy; 10. B. Patty	1. L. Hoad; 2. T. Trabert; 3. K. Rosewall; 4. V. Seixas; 5. J. Drobný; 6. K. Nielsen; 7. B. Patty; 8. M. Rose; 9. S. Davidson; 10. = A. Larsen = G. Mulloy = R. Hartwig	1. T. Trabert; 2. L. Hoad; 3. K. Rosewall; 4. V. Seixas; 5. J. Drobný; 6. A. Larsen; 7. S. Davidson; 8. M. Rose; 9. R. Hartwig; 10. K. Nielsen	1. T. Trabert; 2. = V. Seixas = K. Rosewall; 4. J. Drobný; 5. L. Hoad; 6. A. Larsen; 7. M. Rose; 8. K. Nielsen; 9. S. Davidson; 10. B. Patty	1. T. Trabert; 2. K. Rosewall; 3. V. Seixas; 4. L. Hoad; 5. J. Drobný; 6. M. Rose; 7. R. Hartwig; 8. K. Nielsen; 9. S. Davidson; 10. H. Richardson	1. T. Trabert; 2. L. Hoad; 3. K. Rosewall; 4. V. Seixas; 5. J. Drobný; 6. M. Rose; 7. R. Hartwig; 8. A. Larsen; 9. K. Nielsen; 10. B. Patty	1. V. Seixas; 2. T. Trabert; 3. K. Rosewall; 4. L. Hoad; 5. J. Drobný; 6. M. Rose; 7. K. Nielsen; 8. A. Larsen; 9. G. Mulloy; 10. H. Richardson

Pro
Cleveland tournament committee	George Lyttleton Rogers
1. P. Gonzales; 2. P. Segura; 3. J. Kramer; 4. D. Budge; 5. F. Kovacs; 6. F. Sedgman; 7. B. Riggs; 8. C. Earn; 9. K. McGregor; 10. B. Rogers	1. P. Gonzales; 2. P. Segura; 3. J. Kramer; 4. F. Sedgman; 5. F. Kovacs; 6. K. McGregor; 7. B. Riggs

=== 1954 ===
Amateur
Harry Hopman	Ned Potter	Lance Tingay	New York Times (panel of experts)
1. V. Seixas; 2. J. Drobný; 3. K. Rosewall; 4. B. Patty; 5. R. Hartwig; 6. T. Trabert; 7. L. Hoad; 8. M. Rose; 9. A. Larsen; 10. H. Richardson	1. T. Trabert; 2. V. Seixas; 3. J. Drobný; 4. L. Hoad; 5. K. Rosewall; 6. R. Hartwig; 7. H. Richardson; 8. B. Patty; 9. A. Larsen; 10. S. Davidson	1. J. Drobný; 2. T. Trabert; 3. K. Rosewall; 4. V. Seixas; 5. R. Hartwig; 6. M. Rose; 7. L. Hoad; 8. B. Patty; 9. A. Larsen; 10. = E. Morea = H. Richardson = S. Davidson	1. T. Trabert; 2. J. Drobný; 3. K. Rosewall; 4. V. Seixas; 5. L. Hoad; 6. R. Hartwig; 7. B. Patty; 8. M. Rose; 9. A. Larsen; 10. H. Richardson

Pro
IPTA (Note: International Professional Tennis Association)
1. P. Gonzales
2. P. Segura
3. F. Sedgman
4. D. Budge
5. F. Kovacs
6. B. Riggs
7. J. Kramer
8. C. Earn
9. A. Doyle
10. W. Van Horn

=== 1955 ===
Amateur
Ned Potter	Lance Tingay
1. T. Trabert; 2. K. Rosewall; 3. L. Hoad; 4. V. Seixas; 5. S. Davidson; 6. H. Richardson; 7. R. Hartwig; 8. F. Gardini; 9. K. Nielsen; 10. J. Drobný	1. T. Trabert; 2. K. Rosewall; 3. L. Hoad; 4. V. Seixas; 5. R. Hartwig; 6. B. Patty; 7. H. Richardson; 8. K. Nielsen; 9. J. Drobný; 10. S. Davidson

Pro
IPTA
1. P. Gonzales
2. P. Segura
3. F. Kovacs
4. F. Sedgman
5. B. Riggs
6. C. Earn
7. D. Budge
8. F. Parker
9. D. Pails
10. F. Perry

=== 1956 ===
Amateur
Ned Potter	Lance Tingay
1. L. Hoad; 2. K. Rosewall; 3. H. Richardson; 4. V. Seixas; 5. N. Fraser; 6. A. Cooper; 7. H. Flam; 8. B. Patty; 9. S. Davidson; 10. L. Ayala	1. L. Hoad; 2. K. Rosewall; 3. H. Richardson; 4. V. Seixas; 5. S. Davidson; 6. N. Fraser; 7. A. Cooper; 8. D. Savitt; 9. H. Flam; 10. = B. Patty = N. Pietrangeli

Pro
Jack March (Note: McCauley lists Sedgman at No. 2, Segura at No. 3 for this ranking.)
1. P. Gonzales
2. P. Segura
3. F. Sedgman
4. T. Trabert
5. R. Hartwig
6. F. Kovacs
7. C. Earn
8. B. Riggs
9. D. Budge
10. D. Pails

=== 1957 ===
Amateur
Ned Potter	Lance Tingay	Adrian Quist	Yvon Petra
1. A. Cooper; 2. S. Davidson; 3. M. Anderson; 4. V. Seixas; 5. H. Flam; 6. M. Rose; 7. D. Savitt; 8. L. Ayala; 9. K. Nielsen; 10. N. Fraser	1. A. Cooper; 2. M. Anderson; 3. S. Davidson; 4. H. Flam; 5. N. Fraser; 6. M. Rose; 7. V. Seixas; 8. B. Patty; 9. N. Pietrangeli; 10. D. Savitt	1. A. Cooper; 2. M. Anderson; 3. S. Davidson; 4. V. Seixas; 5. H. Flam; 6. N. Fraser; 7. M. Rose; 8. D. Savitt; 9. L. Ayala; 10. K. Nielsen	1. A. Cooper; 2. M. Anderson; 3. N. Fraser; 4. R. Emerson; 5. S. Davidson; 6. V. Seixas; 7. K. Nielsen; 8. P. Washer; 9. J. Brichant; 10. N. Pietrangeli

Pro
Jack March
1. P. Gonzales
2. P. Segura
3. T. Trabert
4. K. Rosewall
5. F. Sedgman
6. F. Kovacs
7. J. Kramer
8. L. Hoad
9. D. Pails
10. B. Riggs

Combined
Adrian Quist
1. P. Gonzales
2. F. Sedgman
3. L. Hoad
4. K. Rosewall
5. P. Segura
6. A. Cooper
7. M. Anderson
8. S. Davidson
9. V. Seixas
10. H. Flam

=== 1958 ===
Amateur
Ned Potter	Lance Tingay
1. A. Cooper; 2. M. Anderson; 3. M. Rose; 4. N. Fraser; 5. H. Richardson; 6. L. Ayala; 7. B. MacKay; 8. N. Pietrangeli; 9. A. Olmedo; 10. U. Schmidt	1. A. Cooper; 2. M. Anderson; 3. M. Rose; 4. N. Fraser; 5. L. Ayala; 6. H. Richardson; 7. N. Pietrangeli; 8. U. Schmidt; 9. B. MacKay; 10. S. Davidson

Pro
Jack March
1. P. Gonzales
2. L. Hoad
3. P. Segura
4. T. Trabert
5. K. Rosewall
6. F. Sedgman
7. F. Parker
8. F. Kovacs
9. B. Riggs
10. D. Pails

=== 1959 ===
Amateur
Ned Potter	Lance Tingay
1. N. Fraser; 2. A. Olmedo; 3. R. Krishnan; 4. B. Bartzen; 5. L. Ayala; 6. N. Pietrangeli; 7. B. Buchholz; 8. R. Holmberg; 9. R. Laver; 10. B. MacKay	1. N. Fraser; 2. A. Olmedo; 3. N. Pietrangeli; 4. B. MacKay; 5. R. Laver; 6. L. Ayala; 7. R. Emerson; 8. B. Bartzen; 9. R. Krishnan; 10. I. Vermaak

Pro
Jack March	Jack Kramer	Robert Roy (L'Équipe)	Robert Barnes	Ampol rankings
1. P. Gonzales; 2. L. Hoad; 3. P. Segura; 4. T. Trabert; 5. K. Rosewall; 6. F. Sedgman; 7. A. Cooper; 8. F. Parker; 9. M. Anderson; 10. B. Riggs	1. P. Gonzales; 2. F. Sedgman; 3. K. Rosewall; 4. L. Hoad; 5. T. Trabert; 6. P. Segura; 7. A. Cooper; 8. M. Anderson; 9. M. Rose; 10. K. McGregor	1. P. Gonzales; 2. F. Sedgman; 3. K. Rosewall; 4. T. Trabert; 5. L. Hoad; 6. P. Segura; 7. J. Kramer; 8. K. McGregor; 9. R. Hartwig; 10. A. Cooper	1. L. Hoad; 2. P. Gonzales; 3. K. Rosewall; 4. F. Sedgman; 5. T. Trabert; 6. P. Segura; 7. A. Cooper; 8. M. Anderson; 9. M. Rose	1. L. Hoad; 2. P. Gonzales; 3. K. Rosewall; 4. F. Sedgman; 5. T. Trabert; 6. P. Segura; 7. M. Anderson; 8. A. Cooper; 9. M. Rose

=== 1960 ===
Amateur
Ned Potter	Lance Tingay
1. N. Fraser; 2. R. Laver; 3. B. MacKay; 4. N. Pietrangeli; 5. B. Buchholz; 6. R. Emerson; 7. L. Ayala; 8. B. Mark; 9. B. Bartzen; 10. R. Krishnan	1. N. Fraser; 2. R. Laver; 3. N. Pietrangeli; 4. B. MacKay; 5. B. Buchholz; 6. R. Emerson; 7. L. Ayala; 8. R. Krishnan; 9. J.-E. Lundqvist; 10. D. Ralston

Pro
Jack Kramer
1. P. Gonzales
2. F. Sedgman
3. K. Rosewall
4. L. Hoad
5. T. Trabert
6. P. Segura
7. A. Cooper
8. M. Anderson
9. M. Rose
10. K. McGregor

=== 1961 ===
Amateur
Ned Potter	Lance Tingay
1. R. Emerson; 2. R. Laver; 3. N. Pietrangeli; 4. M. Santana; 5. C. McKinley; 6. R. Krishnan; 7. M. Sangster; 8. R. Osuna; 9. L. Ayala; 10. J.-E. Lundqvist	1. R. Laver; 2. R. Emerson; 3. M. Santana; 4. N. Pietrangeli; 5. C. McKinley; 6. R. Krishnan; 7. L. Ayala; 8. N. Fraser; 9. J.-E. Lundqvist; 10. U. Schmidt

Combined
L'Équipe
1. K. Rosewall
2. P. Gonzales
3. L. Hoad
4. T. Trabert
5. P. Segura
6. A. Gimeno
7. A. Cooper
8. B. MacKay
9. A. Olmedo
10. B. Buchholz

=== 1962 ===
Amateur
Ned Potter	Lance Tingay	Ulrich Kaiser (panel of 13 experts)
1. R. Laver; 2. R. Emerson; 3. M. Santana; 4. N. Fraser; 5. C. McKinley; 6. J.-E. Lundqvist; 7. M. Mulligan; 8. R. Osuna; 9. R. Krishnan; 10. F. Stolle	1. R. Laver; 2. R. Emerson; 3. M. Santana; 4. N. Fraser; 5. C. McKinley; 6. R. Osuna; 7. M. Mulligan; 8. B. Hewitt; 9. R. Krishnan; 10. W. Bungert	1. R. Laver; 2. R. Emerson; 3. M. Santana; 4. N. Fraser; 5. C. McKinley; 6. R. Osuna; 7. M. Mulligan; 8. J.-E. Lundqvist; 9. B. Hewitt; 10. R. Krishnan

Combined
Ken Rosewall
1. K. Rosewall
2. L. Hoad
3. A. Gimeno
4. R. Laver
5. B. Buchholz
6. A. Cooper
7. B. MacKay
8. F. Sedgman
9. M. Anderson
10. L. Ayala

=== 1963 ===
Amateur
Ned Potter	Lance Tingay	Ulrich Kaiser (panel of 13 experts)
1. C. McKinley; 2. R. Emerson; 3. M. Santana; 4. D. Ralston; 5. R. Osuna; 6. F. Froehling; 7. F. Stolle; 8. P. Darmon; 9. J.-E. Lundqvist; 10. B. Jovanović	1. R. Osuna; 2. C. McKinley; 3. R. Emerson; 4. M. Santana; 5. F. Stolle; 6. F. Froehling; 7. D. Ralston; 8. B. Jovanović; 9. M. Sangster; 10. M. Mulligan	1. C. McKinley; 2. R. Emerson; 3. R. Osuna; 4. M. Santana; 5. D. Ralston; 6. F. Stolle; 7. F. Froehling; 8. P. Darmon; 9. J.-E. Lundqvist; 10. M. Sangster

IPTPA (Note: International Professional Tennis Players' Association)
1. K. Rosewall
2. R. Laver
3. A. Gimeno
4. B. Buchholz
5. A. Olmedo
6. L. Hoad

(incomplete)

=== 1964 ===
Amateur
Ned Potter	Lance Tingay	Ulrich Kaiser (panel of 14 experts)
1. R. Emerson; 2. C. McKinley; 3. M. Santana; 4. R. Osuna; 5. F. Stolle; 6. D. Ralston; 7. W. Bungert; 8. N. Pietrangeli; 9. J.-E. Lundqvist; 10. P. Darmon	1. R. Emerson; 2. F. Stolle; 3. J.-E. Lundqvist; 4. W. Bungert; 5. C. McKinley; 6. M. Santana; 7. N. Pietrangeli; 8. C. Kuhnke; 9. D. Ralston; 10. R. Osuna	1. R. Emerson; 2. F. Stolle; 3. C. McKinley; 4. M. Santana; 5. J.-E. Lundqvist; 6. W. Bungert; 7. R. Osuna; 8. D. Ralston; 9. N. Pietrangeli; 10. C. Kuhnke

Pro
Norris McWhirter (The Observer)	Official pro rankings (Note: A UPI-syndicated article claimed Gimeno finished No. 3.)
1. K. Rosewall; 2. R. Laver; 3. = P. Gonzales = A. Gimeno; 5. L. Hoad; 6. A. Olmedo; 7. E. Buchholz; 8. R. Haillet	1. K. Rosewall; 2. R. Laver; 3. P. Gonzales; 4. A. Gimeno; 5. B. Buchholz; 6. L. Hoad; 7. A. Olmedo; 8. L. Ayala

Combined
Norris McWhirter
1. K. Rosewall
2. R. Laver
3. = P. Gonzales
  = A. Gimeno
5. L. Hoad
6. = A. Olmedo
  = R. Emerson
  = F. Stolle
  = C. McKinley
10. E. Buchholz

=== 1965 ===
- Last ranking by Potter for World Tennis magazine.

Amateur
Ned Potter	Lance Tingay	Ulrich Kaiser (panel of 16 experts)	Joseph McCauley	Sport za Rubezhom
1. M. Santana; 2. R. Emerson; 3. F. Stolle; 4. C. Drysdale; 5. D. Ralston; 6. A. Ashe; 7. J.-E. Lundqvist; 8. R. Osuna; 9. R. Krishnan; 10. M. Mulligan	1. R. Emerson; 2. M. Santana; 3. F. Stolle; 4. C. Drysdale; 5. M. Mulligan; 6. J.-E. Lundqvist; 7. T. Roche; 8. J. Newcombe; 9. D. Ralston; 10. A. Ashe	1. R. Emerson; 2. M. Santana; 3. F. Stolle; 4. C. Drysdale; 5. D. Ralston; 6. A. Ashe; 7. T. Roche; 8. J. Newcombe; 9. M. Mulligan; 10. J.-E. Lundqvist	1. R. Emerson; 2. M. Santana; 3. F. Stolle; 4. C. Drysdale; 5. M. Mulligan; 6. D. Ralston; 7. J. Newcombe; 8. R. Krishnan; 9. T. Roche; 10. A. Ashe	1. R. Emerson; 2. M. Santana; 3. F. Stolle; 4. C. Drysdale; 5. J. Newcombe; 6. M. Mulligan; 7. T. Roche; 8. R. Osuna; 9. A. Ashe; 10. D. Ralston

=== 1966 ===
Amateur
Lance Tingay	Joseph McCauley (World Tennis)	Pierre de Thier	Sport In The USSR
1. M. Santana; 2. F. Stolle; 3. R. Emerson; 4. T. Roche; 5. D. Ralston; 6. J. Newcombe; 7. A. Ashe; 8. I. Gulyás; 9. C. Drysdale; 10. K. Fletcher	1. F. Stolle; 2. M. Santana; 3. T. Roche; 4. R. Emerson; 5. D. Ralston; 6. A. Ashe; 7. C. Drysdale; 8. J. Newcombe; 9. C. Graebner; 10. I. Gulyás	1. M. Santana; 2. R. Emerson; 3. T. Roche; 4. F. Stolle; 5. D. Ralston; 6. J. Newcombe; 7. C. Drysdale; 8. A. Ashe; 9. O. Davidson; 10. I. Gulyás	1. M. Santana; 2. T. Roche; 3. R. Emerson; 4. F. Stolle; 5. D. Ralston; 6. J. Newcombe; 7. A. Metreveli; 8. K. Fletcher; 9. I. Gulyás; 10. C. Drysdale

=== 1967 ===
Amateur
Lance Tingay	Ulrich Kaiser (panel of 13 experts)	Joseph McCauley	Martini and Rossi
1. J. Newcombe; 2. R. Emerson; 3. M. Santana; 4. M. Mulligan; 5. T. Roche; 6. B. Hewitt; 7. N. Pilić; 8. C. Graebner; 9. A. Ashe; 10. = J. Leschly = W. Bungert = C. Drysdale	1. J. Newcombe; 2. R. Emerson; 3. M. Santana; 4. T. Roche; 5. M. Mulligan; 6. N. Pilić; 7. W. Bungert; 8. B. Hewitt; 9. C. Graebner; 10. J. Leschly	1. J. Newcombe; 2. R. Emerson; 3. M. Mulligan; 4. T. Roche; 5. M. Santana; 6. N. Pilić; 7. W. Bungert; 8. C. Graebner; 9. B. Hewitt; 10. R. Taylor	1. J. Newcombe; 2. R. Emerson; 3. = W. Bungert = C. Graebner; 5. T. Roche; 6. N. Pilić; 7. = E. Scott = J. Leschly = R. Taylor

=== 1968 (start of Open Era) ===
Lance Tingay	Ulrich Kaiser (panel of 18 experts)	Joseph McCauley	Martini and Rossi (panel of 11 experts)	Bud Collins (The Boston Globe)	Rino Tommasi (La Gazzetta dello Sport)	Seagram's (panel of 15 experts)	The Times
1. R. Laver; 2. A. Ashe; 3. K. Rosewall; 4. T. Okker; 5. T. Roche; 6. J. Newcombe; 7. C. Graebner; 8. D. Ralston; 9. C. Drysdale; 10. P. Gonzales	1. R. Laver; 2. A. Ashe; 3. K. Rosewall; 4. T. Okker; 5. J. Newcombe; 6. T. Roche; 7. C. Graebner; 8. C. Drysdale; 9. D. Ralston; 10. P. Gonzales	1. R. Laver; 2. A. Ashe; 3. T. Okker; 4. K. Rosewall; 5. J. Newcombe; 6. T. Roche; 7. C. Graebner; 8. C. Drysdale; 9. P. Gonzales; 10. D. Ralston	1. R. Laver; 2. K. Rosewall; 3. A. Ashe; 4. T. Roche; 5. T. Okker; 6. J. Newcombe; 7. C. Graebner; 8. P. Gonzales; 9. D. Ralston	1. R. Laver; 2. A. Ashe; 3. K. Rosewall; 4. T. Roche; 5. T. Okker; 6. J. Newcombe; 7. C. Graebner; 8. D. Ralston; 9. C. Drysdale; 10. P. Gonzales	1. R. Laver; 2. K. Rosewall; 3. A. Ashe; 4. T. Okker; 5. T. Roche; 6. J. Newcombe; 7. C. Graebner; 8. M. Santana; 9. C. Drysdale; 10. M. Mulligan	1. R. Laver; 2. A. Ashe; 3. T. Okker; 4. K. Rosewall; 5. J. Newcombe; 6. T. Roche; 7. C. Graebner; 8. D. Ralston; 9. M. Santana; 10. R. Emerson	1. R. Laver; 2. K. Rosewall; 3. J. Newcombe; 4. A. Ashe; 5. T. Okker; 6. C. Drysdale; 7. T. Roche; 8. D. Ralston; 9. C. Graebner; 10. P. Gonzales

=== 1969 ===
Lance Tingay	Joseph McCauley	Martini and Rossi (panel of 14 experts)	Bud Collins	Rino Tommasi	Frank Rostron (Daily Express)
1. R. Laver; 2. T. Roche; 3. J. Newcombe; 4. T. Okker; 5. K. Rosewall; 6. A. Ashe; 7. C. Drysdale; 8. P. Gonzales; 9. A. Gimeno; 10. F. Stolle	1. R. Laver; 2. T. Roche; 3. J. Newcombe; 4. T. Okker; 5. K. Rosewall; 6. A. Gimeno; 7. F. Stolle; 8. A. Ashe; 9. R. Emerson; 10. C. Drysdale	1. R. Laver; 2. T. Roche; 3. J. Newcombe; 4. A. Ashe; 5. T. Okker; 6. K. Rosewall; 7. F. Stolle; 8. R. Emerson; 9. S. Smith; 10. P. Gonzales	1. R. Laver; 2. T. Roche; 3. J. Newcombe; 4. K. Rosewall; 5. T. Okker; 6. P. Gonzales; 7. S. Smith; 8. A. Ashe; 9. C. Drysdale; 10. A. Gimeno	1. R. Laver; 2. T. Roche; 3. J. Newcombe; 4. T. Okker; 5. A. Ashe; 6. K. Rosewall; 7. A. Gimeno; 8. C. Drysdale; 9. S. Smith; 10. F. Stolle	1. R. Laver; 2. T. Roche; 3. J. Newcombe; 4. T. Okker; 5. = K. Rosewall = A. Ashe; 7. A. Gimeno; 8. = C. Drysdale = P. Gonzales; 10. = F. Stolle = S. Smith = R. Emerson = C. Graebner

=== 1970 ===
Lance Tingay	Joseph McCauley	Martini and Rossi	Bud Collins	Rino Tommasi	Rex Bellamy (The Times)	Judith Elian (L'Équipe)	Mike Gibson	Tennis magazine (Germany)
1. J. Newcombe; 2. K. Rosewall; 3. R. Laver; 4. T. Roche; 5. T. Okker; 6. I. Năstase; 7. C. Richey; 8. A. Ashe; 9. = A. Gimeno = N. Pilić	1. J. Newcombe; 2. K. Rosewall; 3. T. Roche; 4. R. Laver; 5. A. Ashe; 6. I. Năstase; 7. T. Okker; 8. R. Taylor; 9. J. Kodeš; 10. C. Richey	1. K. Rosewall; 2. R. Laver; 3. J. Newcombe; 4. T. Roche; 5. C. Richey; 6. A. Ashe; 7. T. Okker; 8. R. Emerson; 9. I. Năstase; 10. A. Gimeno	1. J. Newcombe; 2. K. Rosewall; 3. T. Roche; 4. R. Laver; 5. I. Năstase; 6. T. Okker; 7. C. Richey; 8. S. Smith; 9. A. Ashe; 10. A. Gimeno	1. K. Rosewall; 2. J. Newcombe; 3. R. Laver; 4. T. Roche; 5. A. Ashe; 6. C. Richey; 7. S. Smith; 8. I. Năstase; 9. T. Okker; 10. J. Kodeš	1. R. Laver; 2. K. Rosewall; 3. T. Roche; 4. J. Newcombe; 5. A. Ashe; 6. C. Richey; 7. S. Smith; 8. I. Năstase; 9. T. Okker; 10. R. Emerson	1. K. Rosewall; 2. J. Newcombe; 3. T. Roche; 4. R. Laver; 5. C. Richey; 6. A. Ashe; 7. T. Okker; 8. R. Taylor; 9. S. Smith; 10. = J. Kodeš = I. Năstase	1. J. Newcombe; 2. K. Rosewall; 3. R. Laver; 4. T. Roche; 5. C. Richey; 6. I. Năstase; 7. A. Ashe; 8. R. Taylor; 9. D. Ralston; 10. A. Gimeno	1. J. Newcombe; 2. = A. Ashe = J. Kodeš = K. Rosewall; 5. = R. Laver = I. Năstase = T. Roche; 8. T. Okker; 9. = C. Richey = R. Taylor = Ž. Franulović

=== 1971 ===
Lance Tingay	Joseph McCauley	Martini and Rossi	Bud Collins	Rino Tommasi	Rex Bellamy	Frank Rostron	Ilie Năstase
1. J. Newcombe; 2. S. Smith; 3. R. Laver; 4. K. Rosewall; 5. J. Kodeš; 6. A. Ashe; 7. T. Okker; 8. C. Drysdale; 9. M. Riessen; 10. I. Năstase	1. J. Newcombe; 2. S. Smith; 3. R. Laver; 4. K. Rosewall; 5. J. Kodeš; 6. A. Ashe; 7. T. Okker; 8. M. Riessen; 9. C. Drysdale; 10. I. Năstase	1. = J. Newcombe = S. Smith; 3. K. Rosewall; 4. R. Laver; 5. J. Kodeš; 6. T. Okker; 7. A. Ashe; 8. I. Năstase; 9. C. Drysdale; 10. M. Riessen	1. J. Newcombe; 2. S. Smith; 3. K. Rosewall; 4. R. Laver; 5. J. Kodeš; 6. A. Ashe; 7. I. Năstase; 8. T. Okker; 9. C. Drysdale; 10. M. Riessen	1. K. Rosewall; 2. R. Laver; 3. J. Newcombe; 4. S. Smith; 5. I. Năstase; 6. J. Kodeš; 7. A. Ashe; 8. T. Okker; 9. C. Drysdale; 10. M. Riessen	1. J. Newcombe; 2. S. Smith; 3. K. Rosewall; 4. R. Laver; 5. I. Năstase; 6. T. Okker; 7. A. Ashe; 8. J. Kodeš; 9. C. Drysdale; 10. M. Riessen	1. = J. Newcombe = S. Smith; 3. K. Rosewall; 4. R. Laver; 5. = J. Kodeš = I. Năstase; 7. A. Ashe; 8. T. Okker; 9. C. Drysdale; 10. = M. Riessen = Ž. Franulović	1. S. Smith; 2. J. Newcombe; 3. J. Kodeš; 4. R. Laver; 5. K. Rosewall; 6. T. Okker; 7. A. Ashe; 8. M. Riessen; 9. I. Năstase; 10. C. Drysdale

=== 1972 ===
Lance Tingay	Martini and Rossi	Bud Collins	Rino Tommasi	Rex Bellamy	Judith Elian	Frank Rostron	Neil Amdur (World Tennis)
1. S. Smith; 2. I. Năstase; 3. K. Rosewall; 4. R. Laver; 5. A. Ashe; 6. J. Newcombe; 7. C. Richey; 8. M. Orantes; 9. A. Gimeno; 10. J. Kodeš	1. S. Smith; 2. I. Năstase; 3. K. Rosewall; 4. J. Newcombe; 5. A. Ashe; 6. R. Laver; 7. T. Okker; 8. M. Orantes; 9. M. Riessen; 10. B. Lutz	1. S. Smith; 2. K. Rosewall; 3. I. Năstase; 4. R. Laver; 5. A. Ashe; 6. J. Newcombe; 7. B. Lutz; 8. T. Okker; 9. M. Riessen; 10. A. Gimeno	1. K. Rosewall; 2. R. Laver; 3. S. Smith; 4. J. Newcombe; 5. I. Năstase; 6. A. Ashe; 7. T. Okker; 8. M. Riessen; 9. M. Orantes; 10. C. Drysdale	1. S. Smith; 2. I. Năstase; 3. R. Laver; 4. K. Rosewall; 5. J. Newcombe; 6. A. Ashe; 7. T. Okker; 8. M. Orantes; 9. M. Riessen; 10. A. Gimeno	1. S. Smith; 2. I. Năstase; 3. K. Rosewall; 4. R. Laver; 5. A. Ashe; 6. J. Newcombe; 7. M. Orantes; 8. T. Okker; 9. M. Riessen; 10. C. Drysdale	1. S. Smith; 2. I. Năstase; 3. K. Rosewall; 4. R. Laver; 5. A. Ashe; 6. J. Newcombe; 7. = C. Richey = M. Orantes; 9. A. Gimeno; 10. = T. Okker = J. Kodeš	1. S. Smith; 2. I. Năstase; 3. K. Rosewall; 4. R. Laver; 5. A. Ashe; 6. J. Newcombe; 7. C. Richey; 8. M. Riessen; 9. M. Orantes; 10. A. Gimeno

== See also ==
- World number 1 ranked male tennis players
- List of ATP number 1 ranked singles tennis players
- Top ten ranked female tennis players
- Top ten ranked female tennis players (1921–1974)

== Bibliography ==
- Almanacco illustrato del tennis 1989. Edizioni Panini. 1989.
- Barrett, John, ed. (1990). World Of Tennis. London: Collins Willow. ISBN 9780002183550.
- Collins, Bud; Hollander, Zander (1997). Bud Collins' Tennis Encyclopedia (3rd ed.). Detroit: Visible Ink Press. ISBN 978-1578590001.
- McCauley, Joe (2000). The History of Professional Tennis. Windsor: The Short Run Book Company Limited.
- Collins, Bud (2010). The Bud Collins History of Tennis (2nd ed.). New York: New Chapter Press. ISBN 978-0942257700.
