= Ned Potter =

Ned Potter may refer to:

- E. B. Potter, known as Ned
- Ned Potter, tennis writer and coach, see World no. 1 women tennis players
