= Joseph McCauley (tennis) =

British writer

- Born: ? Great Britain
- Died: ?
- Occupations: Author, historian, journalist, writer
- Writing career
- Period: 1966-1971
- Genre: Sport
- Subject: Tennis
- Notable work: The History of Professional Tennis (2000)

Joseph McCauley was a British tennis author and journalist. He was a contributor for World Tennis Magazine for many years, and took over from Ned Potter in 1966 in compiling the annual world rankings until 1971.

Neil Amdur succeeded him in 1972. In August 1973 the ATP computurised rankings began. He is most known for his book "The History of Professional Tennis" documenting the pre open era men's Pro Tennis Tour from 1911 to 1968.

== Books ==
- The History of Professional Tennis (2000) forwards by Bud Collins and Tony Trabert. The Short Book Run Co Ltd. Windsor. ASIN: B001EOVE56.

== Magazines ==
- World Tennis Magazine

(contributing writer, and rankings)

== See also ==
- Top ten ranked male tennis players (1912–1972)
