= Bristol Cup =

Defunct tennis tournament
- Founded: 1920
- Abolished: 1932
- Location: Cannes (1920-21, 1924-25); Menton (1922-23); Beaulieu-sur-Mer (1926-27, 1929-32), France
- Venue: Beaulieu Lawn Tennis Club (1926-27, 1929-32); Carlton Club (1920-21, 1924-25)
- Surface: Clay

The Bristol Cup was a professional men's tennis tournament staged in Beaulieu-sur-Mer, Cannes and Menton in France from 1920 to 1932.

== History ==
Before 1930 some tournaments were sometimes labelled "Professional Championships of France": the Bristol Cup (held from 1920 to 1932), the most important pro tournament in the world in the 1920s, was sometimes referred as the French Pro as well as the World Pro tournament held at Deauville in 1925. Therefore, two different tournaments were both considered as French Pro Championships in 1925 (World Pro at Deauville and Bristol Cup at Cannes) and from 1930 to 1932 (Roland Garros and Bristol Cup at Beaulieu).

The tournament was staged at the Beaulieu Lawn Tennis Club that was founded in 1912 by Sir Blundell Maple, on land that belonged to him adjoining the Hotel Bristol which opened in 1899, Beaulieu-sur-Mer, France from 1926 to 1927 and again from 1929 to 1932.

In 1928 the Bristol Cup tournament was jointly known as the World Professional Championships or World Pro Championships and was the 4th edition of that event since 1924.

== Champions ==
=== Men's Singles ===
Event that year was the World Professional Championship.

Date	City	Champion	Runner-up	Score
20–26 December 1920	Cannes	(Monaco) Romeo Acquarone	(France) Joseph Negro	3–6, 7–5, 5–7, 6–2, 6–3
12–18 December 1921	Cannes	(United Kingdom) John C. S. Rendall	(United Kingdom) A. Page	6–3, 6–4, 4–6, 7–5
19–23 December 1922	Menton	(United Kingdom) John C. S. Rendall	(France) Joseph Negro	6–1, 0–6, 6–4, 6–2 (or 6–1, 0–6, 6–4, 6–1)
17–23 December 1923	Menton	(United Kingdom) John C. S. Rendall	(France) Joseph Negro	6–2, 6–3, 7–5
15–21 December 1924	Cannes (Métropole)	(Republic of Ireland) Albert Burke	(Germany) Roman Najuch	7–5, 1–6, 6–4, 6–1
21–27 December 1925	Cannes (Métropole)	(Republic of Ireland) Albert Burke	(Germany) Roman Najuch	0–6, 4–6, 6–4, 6–4, 6–1
13–19 December 1926	Beaulieu (Note: McCauley lists location as Beaulieu in 1926)	(Czechoslovakia) Karel Koželuh	(Republic of Ireland) Albert Burke	3–6, 6–1, 6–2, 6–0.
1927	Not held			
9–15 January 1928	Beaulieu (Note: McCauley lists location as Beaulieu in 1928)	(Czechoslovakia) Karel Koželuh	(Germany) Roman Najuch	6–3, 6–2, 6–4. (Note: McCauley lists this as the 4th edition of the World Pro Championships at Beaulieu in 1928)
7–13 January 1929	Beaulieu (Note: McCauley lists location as Beaulieu in 1929)	(Czechoslovakia) Karel Koželuh	(Republic of Ireland) Albert Burke	6–3, 6–1, 6–0.
13–19 January 1930	Beaulieu (Note: McCauley lists location as Beaulieu in 1930)	(Czechoslovakia) Karel Koželuh	(Germany) Roman Najuch	6–3, 6–4, 6–4.
12–18 January 1931	Beaulieu (Note: McCauley lists location as Beaulieu in 1931)	(Czechoslovakia) Karel Koželuh	(Republic of Ireland) Albert Burke	6–3, 6–1, 5–7, 6–4.
4–10 January 1932	Beaulieu (Note: McCauley lists location as Beaulieu in 1932)	(Czechoslovakia) Karel Koželuh	(France) Martin Plaa	6–1, 6–4, 1–6, 6–0.

== Bibliography ==
- Gobbie, Donn Thomas, "Gladys Heldman and the Original Nine: The Visionaries Who Pioneered the Women's Professional Tennis Circuit" (2015). Open Access Dissertations. 1413.
- Little, Alan, (2014). The Golden Days of Tennis on the French Riviera 1874–1939. London: Wimbledon Lawn Tennis Museum. ISBN 9780906741542.
- McCauley, Joe (2000). The History of Professional Tennis. Windsor: The Short Run Book Company Limited.
