= World Tennis Magazine =

Sports magazine

World Tennis
- Categories: Sports magazine
- Publisher: Randy Walker
- First issue: May 1953
- Company: New Chapter Media
- Country: United States
- Based in: New York City
- Language: English
- Website: worldtennismagazine.com

World Tennis is a US online magazine that covers tennis. A highly influential publication, it was founded by Gladys Heldman as a printed magazine, and was first published in May 1953. It was originally co produced with Gardnar Mulloy, and its offices were based in New York City. The magazine was usually published twelve times a year. In 1975 it was sold to CBS Publishing. It remained in print up to 1991 then stopped. Since 2009 the magazine exists as a website and media company, World Tennis Magazine.com. and is currently owned by Randy Walker of New Chapter Media.

== Contributors ==
- Cliff Richey
- Bob Stockton
- Chris Nicholson
- Bob Greene
- Charlie Bricker
- Justin Cohen
- Tom Swick
- Chloe Wellington-Hunt
- Blair Henley
- Cynthia Lum

== Former Contributors ==
- Art Larsen
- Bill Talbert
- Dorothy Head Knode
- Hal Burrows
- Ham Richardson
- Joseph McCauley (world rankings)
- Ned Potter (world rankings)
- Neil Amdur
- Vinnie Richards
- Wilmer Allison

== Former Article Writers ==
- Barbara Scofield Davidson
- Bill Tilden
- Don Budge
- Fred Perry
- Harry Hopman
- Karol Fageros
- L.D. Simmons
- Tony Mottram
- Tony Trabert
- Susie Herr

== Former International Writers ==
- Thelma Coyne Long (Australia)
- Betty Rosenquest Pratt (British West Indies)
- Eric Williams (Cuba)
- Charles Khouri (Egypt)
- Clay Iles (Great Britain)
- J.A. Downey (Ireland)
- Gloria Butler (Europe)
- Francisco Lona (Mexico)
- William Lufler (Scandinavia)
- Sissy Leach (South Africa)

== Former US Writers ==
- Andrew Stern (Eastern)
- Harry James (Intermountain)
- Hal Burrows (Middle Atlantic)
- Grant Golden (Midwest)
- Midge Buck (New England)
- Bobby Platt (Southern)
- Bobby Wertheimer (Texas)
- Andy Ross Dilley (Tournaments)
- Wilma Smith (West Coast)

== Official site ==
- https://worldtennismagazine.com/
