= Albert Burke (tennis) =

Irish tennis player (1901–1958)

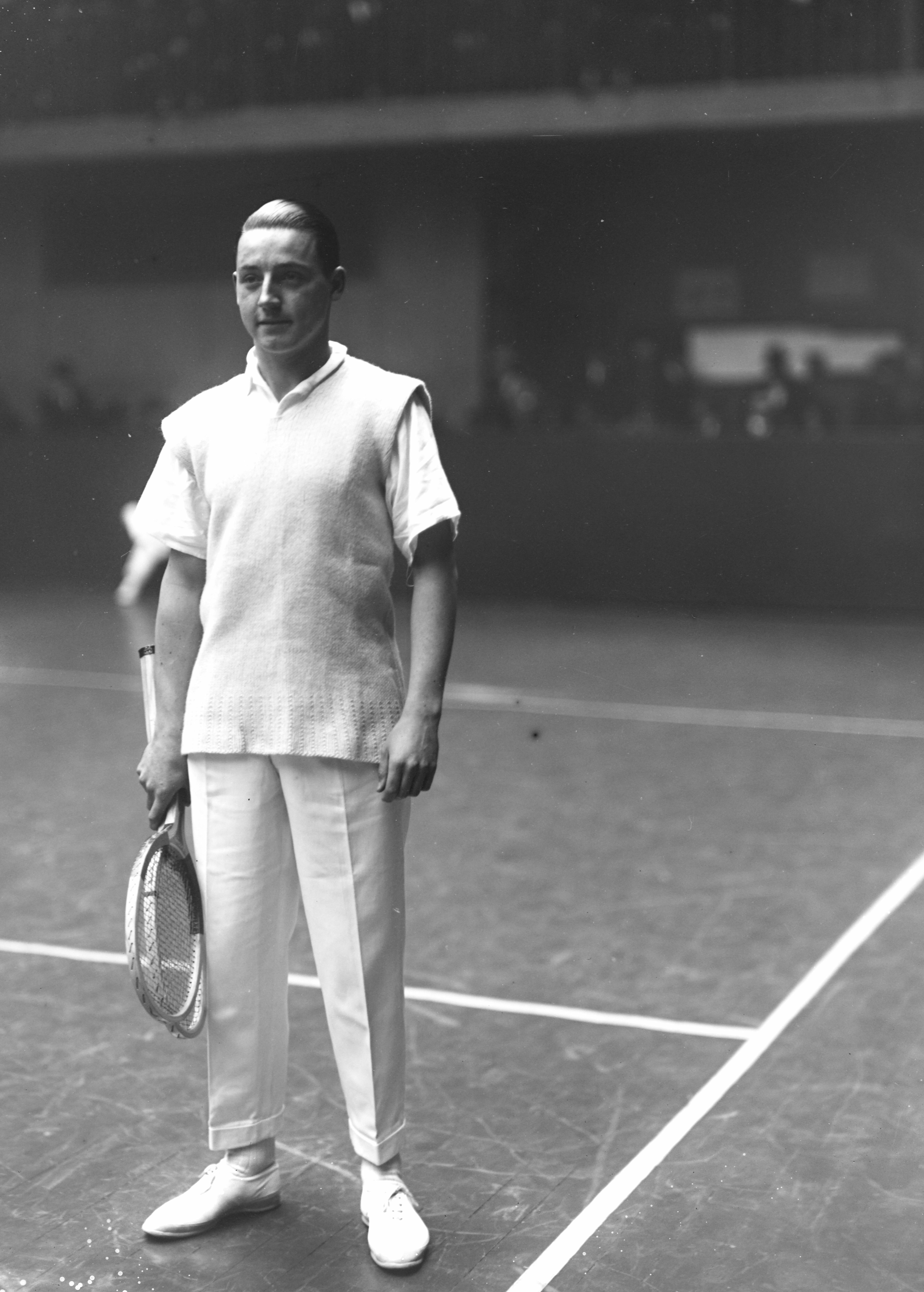
- Country (sports): Ireland
- Born: 1901
- Died: November 1958 (aged 57)

Other tournaments
- Professional majors
- US Pro: QF (1931, 1932)
- Wembley Pro: QF (1935)
- French Pro: 2nd (1930)

Albert Burke (1901–1958) was a French-born professional tennis player of Irish descent who described himself as British but was classed as a representative of Ireland and, on other occasions, of France when playing in international tournaments. In 1924 and 1925 he won the Bristol Cup tournament, which was at that time the principal competition for tennis professionals.

== Family ==
Albert Burke, born at Neuilly-sur-Seine in 1901, was a son of Thomas Burke, one of the earliest tennis professionals. His father had been the tennis coach at Dublin's Lansdowne Club (where the champions Joshua Pim and Frank Stoker were among those he guided) before moving to France in 1897 at the behest of Victor Voss. Thomas Burke became tutor at the Tennis Club de Paris and in 1898, on winning matches on the club's covered court against fellow professionals George Kerr (Fitzwilliam, Dublin) and Tom Fleming (Queen's, London), he was acclaimed "the world's professional tennis champion". He was still popularly known as such in March 1906, but was said to be "formerly" world champion by the end of that year. In 1900 he became coach at Nice Lawn Tennis Club and later relocated to Cannes where he worked under contract to the Hotel Metropole before becoming senior professional at the Carlton Lawn Tennis Club there. He was also active in Paris and at Le Touquet and was engaged to teach tennis to the Prince of Wales in 1912.

Thomas's three sons, Tommy, Albert and Edmund, were all raised to succeed their father in the game. The eldest, Tommy, was already playing professionally by February 1914 when, aged 13, he played a set against the former British Prime Minister Arthur Balfour at Cannes. He was subsequently eclipsed by Albert and by Edmund, the latter enjoying a long and consistent professional career but without matching Albert's degree of success.

== Career ==
Albert coached at the Lawn Tennis Club of Marseille in 1920 but soon after, following the death of his father, he returned to the Carlton Club's seven court-complex at Cannes. In 1922 he won the international professional invitation tournament at Lloyd Park, Walthamstow (sponsored by the News of the World), defeating Joseph Negro in straight sets in the semi-final and overcoming Charles Read of Queen's Club in the final "after a magnificent contest that lasted two and a half hours".

When organising tournaments at the Carlton Courts he was able to attract the best players of the day, both professional and amateur, and in the course of a 1923 competition four hundred and twenty matches were played there in the course of a single week. These included a “memorable” contest between Suzanne Lenglen and Elizabeth Ryan and a match between Burke and the Frenchman Henri d'Arsonville, then regarded as the world professional champion. The latter encounter attracted heavy betting on its outcome, "thrilled a large audience and ended in a win for the French player". In 1925 Burke, partnered by Lenglen, played in an exhibition match against René Lacoste and Yvonne Bourgeois at Nice.

Albert Burke won the Bristol Cup in France in 1924 and 1925, beating Roman Najuch in both finals. He was also losing finalist in the Bristol Cup in 1926, 1929 and 1931, defeated in all three finals by Karel Koželuh.

In the absence of Koželuh he won the Deauville tournament in 1927, meeting Joseph Negro, Howard Kinsey and his own brother Edmund in the final pool, and beating them all without losing a set. On account of this victory he was saluted as "champion of the world", and he was the acknowledged Champion of France when, in the following year, he played in the 1928 Bristol Cup competition and appeared at the World Professional Singles Championship at Queen's Club, defeating the title holder, Dan Maskell, in the third round. Playing against his brother Edmund and their assistant coach at Cannes, Robert Ramillon, Albert won the doubles final at Queen's with Roman Najuch as his partner, but it was Ramillon who defeated Edmund to take the singles title.

Burke finished second in the 1930 French Pro Championship round robin, while Karel Koželuh was the winner. At the US Pro Tennis Championships Burke was a quarter finalist in 1931 (losing to Howard Kinsey) and 1932 (losing to Bill Tilden). In 1931, at an exhibition match at Crawford Notch, he had defeated Tilden in what was described as "the best feat of his career".

At the 1935 Wembley Championships, Burke lost in the quarter finals to Ellsworth Vines. The following year he partnered Henri Cochet to the doubles title at the French Professional Championships.

== Death ==
Burke died at Cannes on 22 November 1958, aged 57. A newspaper report of his death recalled that his tennis pupils had included the Duke of Edinburgh and Rita Hayworth.
