= American Lawn Tennis =

Sports magazine

- Categories: Sports magazine
- Publisher: American Lawn Tennis Publishing Company (1907-1951); Rea Publications (1950-1951)
- First issue: April 15, 1907
- Country: United States
- Based in: New York City
- Language: English

American Lawn Tennis (ALT) was a prominent monthly sports periodical published from 1907 to 1951, serving as an authoritative record of national and international tennis during the first half of the 20th century.

Founded and edited by Stephen Wallis Merrihew, the publication documented the sport's evolution, acting as the official voice of the United States Lawn Tennis Association (USLTA) from April 1907 to March 1924. It included thorough tournament reports, tennis statistics, and photographic essays, offering a comprehensive archive of the pre open era's players, equipment, and tactical playing statistics.

Under Merrihew’s guidance, American Lawn Tennis championed the growth of the sport by providing coverage of college matches, youth programs, and the women's circuit. Furthermore, the publication served as an early forum for debates surrounding the professionalization of the game and the removal of racial barriers to integration.

Today the International Tennis Hall of Fame has collaborated with Google Arts and Culture to digitize and present the full print run of American Lawn Tennis magazine.

== Editorial ==
- Stephen Wallis Merrihew
- Alice Marble

== Contributors and writers ==
- Allison Danzig
- Bill Tilden
- Fred Perry
- Helen Wills
- Jack Kramer
- Jeane Hoffman
- Ned Potter
- Philip Hawk

== Rankings ==
=== Official ===
- Ned Potter
- USLTA Rankings Committee

=== Re-printed foreign rankings ===
- A. Wallis Myers (London Daily Telegraph)
- John Olliff (London Daily Telegraph)
- Pierre Gillou (L'Auto)

=== Guest player rankings ===
- Bill Tilden
