= Stephen Wallis Merrihew =

American sports publisher (1862-1947)

Stephen Wallis Merrihew (October 14, 1862 – March 21, 1947) was an American editor, founder and publisher of the American Lawn Tennis magazine and an ardent advocate of a variety of sports, like tennis and cycling.

== Background ==
Stephen Wallis 'Pop' Merrihew was born on October 14, 1862, in Wilmington, Delaware. He was the son of Captain Stephen Wallis Merrihew and Caroline (Starr) Merrihew. His name was usually written as S. Wallis Merrihew.

== American Lawn Tennis magazine ==
Merrihew founded American Lawn Tennis (ALT) magazine in 1907 as the official organ of the United States Lawn Tennis Association (USLTA). In the magazine he supported Bill Tilden in his dispute with the USLTA regarding the player-writer rule. As a result, the USLTA no longer allowed ALT to be published as its official organ. Merrihew sold the magazine in October 1942 although he remained an editor and writer of his column 'Intimate Talks with my Readers' until his death.

== Personal life ==
In 1894 Merrihew married Hetty K. Lawson from whom he separated in 1921. In 1934, after his ex-wife's death, he married Daisy Smith.

Stephen Wallis Merrihew died on March 21, 1947, at the age of 84 in Laurel, Mississippi.

== Bibliography ==
- The Quest of the Davis Cup (1928)
- Methods and Players of Modern Lawn Tennis (1915) editor
- Match Play and the Spin of the Ball (1925) editor
