= John C. S. Rendall =

British tennis player

John Charles Shuttleworth Rendall
- Country (sports): United Kingdom
- Born: 19 March 1882 Derbyshire, United Kingdom
- Died: 1965 (aged 82). Wiltshire, United Kingdom
- Turned pro: 1921 (amateur tour from 1906)
- Retired: 1926

Grand Slam singles results
- Wimbledon: 3R (1907)

John Charles Shuttleworth Rendall (1882 – 1965) was a British professional tennis player of the 1920s. He won the Bristol Cup in France in 1921 (beating A. Page in final), 1922 (beating Joseph Negro in final) and 1923 (beating Joseph Negro in final). The Bristol Cup was the top professional tournament in the early 1920s. Before turning professional in 1921, Rendall had been an amateur tennis player. He lost in the third round of Wimbledon men's singles in 1907 to Karl Behr. He lost in the second round of Wimbledon men's singles in 1912 to James Cecil Parke. Rendall was a Major in the Indian Army.
