= Joseph Negro =

Former French tennis player

Joseph Negro (December 17, 1896—April 23, 1971) was a French professional tennis player. He was a three-time runner-up at the Bristol Cup, a precursor to the professional Grand Slam tournaments in the amateur era, in 1920, 1922, and 1923. He also worked as a teaching professional at the Nice Lawn Tennis Club on the French Riviera, where he coached Suzanne Lenglen as a child, who later became a 21-time Grand Slam champion and one of the best women's tennis players in the amateur era. He had also worked as a coach at Russian tennis clubs, including in Odessa.

Negro was known for his all-court game and his ability to hit a wide variety of tricky shots. His tennis prowess was described as "If you told me he could make the ball sit up and beg, I wouldn't be the least bit surprised." He moved to Nice as a child in 1902, where he started out in tennis working as a ball boy for members of the Nice Tennis Club. Later in his life, Negro injured his leg during World War I before his best results at the Bristol Cup. He is also thought to be the inspiration for a character in The Original of Laura, a book by Vladimir Nabokov. He had played tennis with Nabokov in the 1960s, who described Negro as "a semi-lame swarthy old man who comes to life on court like cactus breaking into blossom".
