= Ned Potter (tennis) =

American writer (1936–1971)

- Born: Edward Clarkson Potter; 5 September 1886; United States
- Died: 5 September 1971 (aged 85); Coral Gables, Florida, United States
- Occupations: Author, historian, writer
- Writing career
- Period: 1933-1969
- Genre: Sport
- Subject: Tennis
- Notable works: Kings of the Court; The Davis Cup
- Notable awards: Marlboro Award

Edward Clarkson Potter (5 September 1886 - September 5, 1971) was a leading American tennis author, editor, writer, historian, and later businessman. He was also correspondent for American Lawn Tennis, and a regular contributor to Racquet and World Tennis magazines.

His annual world tennis rankings for American Lawn Tennis & World Tennis (1934–1965), were one of the most authoritative published. In addition he was a member of the executive committee of United States Lawn Tennis Association, he was also the editor of the annual USLTA year books and guide. In 1961 he received the Marlboro Award for services to tennis.

== Published works ==
- Kings of the court: The story of lawn tennis. (January 1, 1936) C. Scribner's Sons, Ltd.
- The West Side Tennis Club story : 60th anniversary, 1892–1952, (January 1, 1952) Marbridge Print. Co ASIN: B0006EHDHS
- The Davis Cup (January 1, 1969) South Brunswick [N. J. ] A. S. Barnes; First Edition. ISBN 978-0498066658

== See also ==
- A. Wallis Myers
- Bud Collins
- Lance Tingay
- Richard Evans
