= Anthony Wilding career statistics =

This is a list of the main career statistics of New Zealand former tennis player Anthony Wilding (1883–1915) whose amateur career spanned from the beginning of the 20th century until the outbreak of World War I. Wilding won six Grand Slam singles titles, including four Wimbledon Championships. In addition he won the World Hard Court Championships and World Covered Court Championships. As a member of the Australasia team (Note: Between 1905 and 1914 Australia and New Zealand entered the Davis Cup competition as a combined Australasia team. Wilding would be the only New Zealander to play for the team while it existed.) he won the Davis Cup in 1907, 1908, 1909 and 1914.

== Performance timeline ==
Key
W	F	SF	QF	#R	RR	Q#	DNQ	A	NH

(W) winner; (F) finalist; (SF) semifinalist; (QF) quarterfinalist; (#R) rounds 4, 3, 2, 1; (RR) round-robin stage; (Q#) qualification round; (DNQ) did not qualify; (A) absent; (NH) not held; (SR) strike rate (events won / competed); (W–L) win–loss record.

Events with a challenge round: (W_{C}) won; (CR) lost the challenge round; (F_{A}) all comers' finalist

	1904	1905	1906	1907	1908	1909	1910	1911	1912	1913	1914	SR	W–L	Win %
Grand Slam tournaments												6 / 12	30–6	83.3
French	not held											0 / 0	0–0	–
Wimbledon	2R	QF	SF	2R	QF	A	W_{C}	W_{C}	W_{C}	W_{C}	CR	4 / 10	23–6	79.3
U.S.	A	A	A	A	A	A	A	A	A	A	A	0 / 0	0–0	–
Australian	NH	A	W	A	A	W	A	A	A	A	A	2 / 2	7–0	100.0
Win–loss	1–1	3–1	7–1	1–1	3–1	4–0	8–0	1–0	1–0	1–0	0–1			

== Grand Slam finals ==
=== Singles: (6 titles, 1 runner-up) ===
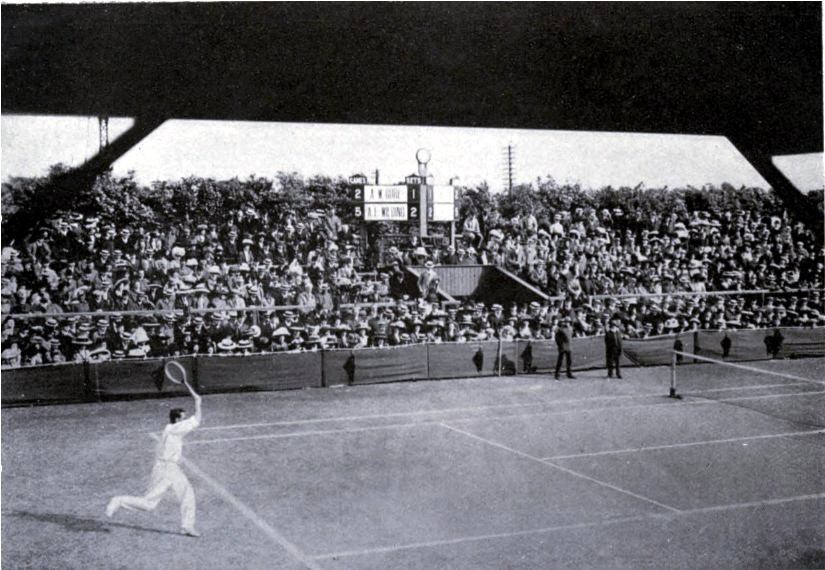
Wilding's last stroke at 1910 Wimbledon final against Arthur Gore.

Result	Year	Championship	Surface	Opponent	Score
Win	1906	Australasian Championships	Grass	(New Zealand) Francis Fisher	6–0, 6–4, 6–4
Win	1909	Australasian Championships	Grass	(Australia) Ernie Parker	6–1, 7–5, 6–2
Win	1910	Wimbledon	Grass	(United Kingdom) Arthur Gore	6–4, 7–5, 4–6, 6–2
Win	1911	Wimbledon	Grass	(United Kingdom) Herbert Roper Barrett	6–4, 4–6, 2–6, 6–2 ret.
Win	1912	Wimbledon	Grass	(United Kingdom) Arthur Gore	6–4, 6–4, 4–6, 6–4
Win	1913	Wimbledon (Note: Between 1913 and 1923 Wimbledon was known as the World Grass Court Championships sanctioned by the ILTF)	Grass	(United States) Maurice McLoughlin	8–6, 6–3, 10–8
Loss	1914	Wimbledon (Note: Between 1913 and 1923 Wimbledon was known as the World Grass Court Championships sanctioned by the ILTF)	Grass	(Australia) Norman Brookes	4–6, 4–6, 5–7

=== Doubles: (5 titles, 2 runner-ups) ===
Result	Year	Championship	Surface	Partner	Opponents	Score
Win	1906	Australian Championships	Grass	(Australia) Rodney Heath	(Australia) Cecil C. Cox (New Zealand) Harry Parker	6–2, 6–4, 6–2
Win	1907	Wimbledon	Grass	(Australia) Norman Brookes	(United States) Karl Behr (United States) Beals Wright	6–4, 6–4, 6–2
Win	1908	Wimbledon	Grass	(United Kingdom) Major Ritchie	(United Kingdom) Arthur Gore (United Kingdom) Herbert Roper Barrett	6–1, 6–2, 1–6, 9–7
Loss	1908	Australian Championships	Grass	(Australia) Granville G. Sharp	(United States) Fred Alexander (Australia) Alfred Dunlop	3–6, 2–6, 1–6
Loss	1909	Australian Championships	Grass	(New Zealand) Tom Crooks	(New Zealand) J. P. Keane (Australia) Ernie Parker	6–1, 1–6, 1–6, 7–9
Win	1910	Wimbledon	Grass	(United Kingdom) Major Ritchie	(United Kingdom) Arthur Gore (United Kingdom) Herbert Roper Barrett	6–1, 6–1, 6–2
Win	1914	Wimbledon	Grass	(Australia) Norman Brookes	(United Kingdom of Great Britain and Ireland) Herbert Roper Barrett (United Kingdom of Great Britain and Ireland) Charles Dixon	6–1, 6–1, 5–7, 8–6

=== Mixed Doubles: (1 runner-ups) ===
Result	Year	Championship	Surface	Partner	Opponents	Score
Loss	1914	Wimbledon	Grass	(France) Marguerite Broquedis	(United Kingdom) Ethel Thomson Larcombe (United Kingdom) James Cecil Parke	6–4, 4–6, 2–6

== World Championships finals ==
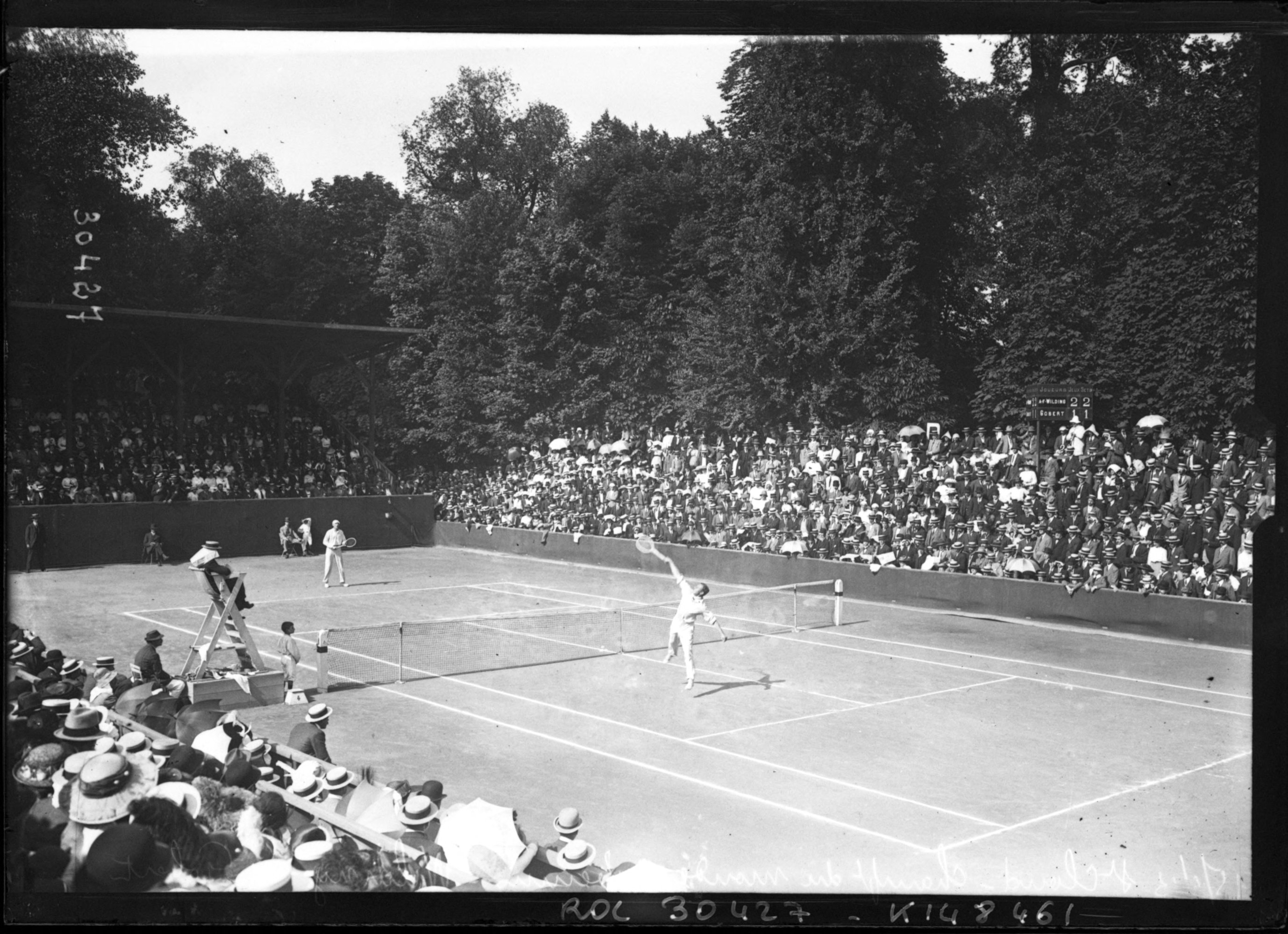
1913 World Hard Court Championships men's final between Tony Wilding and André Gobert (15 June 1913)

In 1913 the International Lawn Tennis Federation (ILTF) designated Wimbledon as the official World Grass Championship together with the World Hard Court Championships and World Covered Court Championships. This lasted until 1923 when the current Grand Slam tournaments were designated as 'Official Championships'.

=== Singles: (3 titles) ===
Result	Year	Championship	Surface	Opponent	Score
Win	1913	World Hard Court Championships	Clay	(France) André Gobert	6–3, 6–3, 1–6, 6–4
Win	1913	World Covered Court Championships	Wood	(France) Maurice Germot	5–7, 6–2, 6–3, 6–1
Win	1914	World Hard Court Championships	Clay	(Austria-Hungary) Ludwig von Salm-Hoogstraeten	6–0, 6–2, 6–4

=== Doubles: (1 runner-up) ===
Result	Year	Championship	Surface	Partner	Opponents	Score
Loss	1913	World Hard Court Championships	Clay	(German Empire) Otto Froitzheim	(German Empire) Heinrich Kleinschroth (German Empire) Moritz von Bissing	5–7, 6–0, 3–6, 6–8

=== Mixed doubles: (1 runner-up) ===
Result	Year	Championship	Surface	Partner	Opponents	Score
Loss	1913	World Hard Court Championships	Clay	(France) Germaine Golding	(United States) Elizabeth Ryan (France) Max Decugis	default

== Singles titles ==
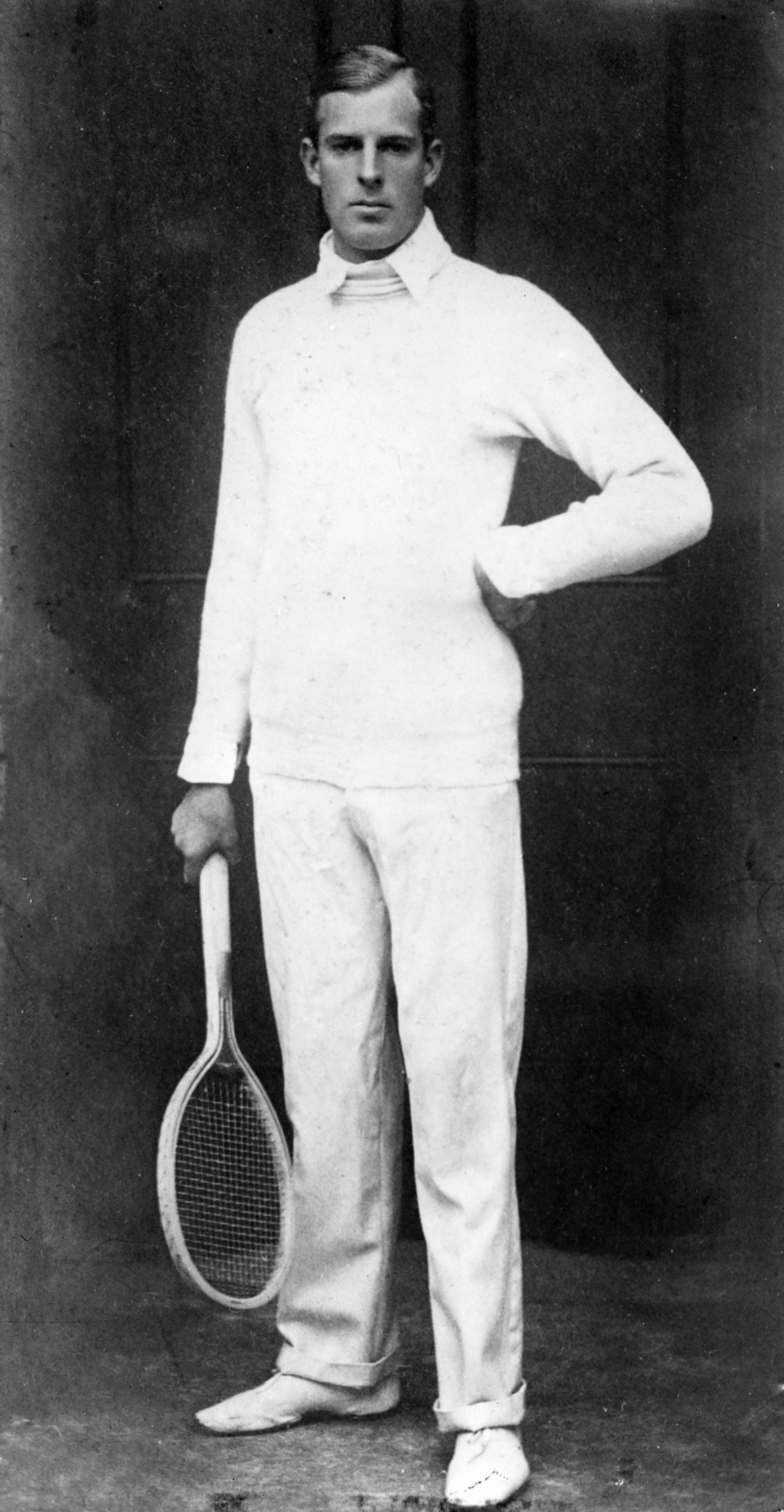
Anthony Wilding, ca 1912

Legend
Grand Slam titles
World Championship titles

No.	Date	Tournament	Surface	Opponent	Score
–	1 – 17 October 1901 (Note: Tournament may have started on 30 September.)	Canterbury Championships, New Zealand	Grass	(New Zealand) Richard Harman	2–6, 8–6, 3–6, 6–0, 6–3
–	27 – 31 December 1901	Ashburton, New Zealand	Grass	(New Zealand) Thomas Lynch	6–0, 6–3
–	March – April 1902	Intercollegiate Championships Christchurch, New Zealand	Grass	(New Zealand) F.D. Rice	6–4, 6–2
–	March 1903	The Freshmen's Tournament, Cambridge University, England	Grass	(United Kingdom) R.P. Keigwin	6–0, 6–0
1.	21 – 23 July 1904	Championships of Shropshire, Shrewsbury, England	Grass	(United Kingdom) E.V. Jones	4–6, 9–7, 8–6, ret.
2.	18 – 23 July 1904	Thompson Challenge Cup, Redhill, England	Grass	(United Kingdom) Albert D. Prebble	6–0, 6–1, ret.
3.	1 – 8 August 1904	Scottish Championships, Moffat	Grass	(United Kingdom) C.J. Glenny	6–1, 6–1, 6–2
4.	22 – 27 August 1904	North Cumberland, Edenside Tournament, Carlisle, England	Grass	(United Kingdom) G.C. Glenny	6–0, 6–2, 6–3
5.	4 – 8 July 1905	Hertfordshire and North Middlesex Championship, New Barnet, England	Grass	(United Kingdom) J.L. Figgis	6–0, 6–0
6.	17 – 22 July 1905	Thompson Challenge Cup, Redhill, England	Grass	(United Kingdom) Kenneth Powell	6–1, 6–2, 6–1
7.	12 – 21 August 1905	Championships of Germany (Pöseldorf Cup), Hamburg, Germany	Clay	(United Kingdom) Major Ritchie	3–6, 6–2, 6–4, 3–6, 6–2
8.	25 August – 1 September 1905	Championship of Europe, Homburg, Germany	Clay	(United Kingdom) George Hillyard	5–7, 7–5, 2–6, 6–3, 7–5
9.	11 – 18 September 1905	Le Touquet, France	Clay	(United Kingdom) Lionel Escombe	6–2, 6–3, 6–0
10.	5 – March 1906	Championship of the Riviera, Menton, France	Clay	(United Kingdom) Major Ritchie	6–1, 6–4, 6–0
11.	20 – March 1906	Championship of Cannes, Cannes Beau Site, France	Clay	(United Kingdom) Wilberforce Eaves	6–2, 6–1, 6–3
12.	29 March – 1 April 1906	Championships of Barcelona, Spain	Clay	(Spain) José Capará	6–1, 6–0, 6–0
13.	Early April 1906	Lyons Covered Courts Championship, France	Asphalt	(United Kingdom) Major Ritchie	?
14.	April – 18 April 1906	French Covered Court Championships, Paris, France	Wood	(United Kingdom) Major Ritchie	6–2, 6–1, 6–1
15a.	8 – 13 May 1906	Wiesbaden Championship, Germany	Clay	(Germany) Karl Schmidt-Knatz	6–2, 6–1, 6–3
15b.	8 – 13 May 1906	Wiesbaden Cup, Germany	Clay	(Germany) Otto Froitzheim	6–1, 9–7, 6–3
16.	15 – 19 May 1906	Reading, Berkshire, England	Grass	(United Kingdom) David M. Hawes	6–0, 6–4, 6–0
17.	4 – 6 June 1906	Sheffield and Hallamshire, England	Grass	(United Kingdom) E. Watson	6–1, 6–0, 6–1
18.	9 – 14 June 1906	Championship of Austria, Prague, Austria-Hungary	Clay	(United Kingdom) Major Ritchie	7–5, 2–6, 7–5, 6–3
19.	9 – 14 June 1906	Prague*, Austria-Hungary	Clay	(Austria-Hungary) Kurt von Wessely (Note: Von Wessely played under the pseudonym "Hartmann")	7–5, 6–3
20.	9 – 12 July 1906	Epsom Open Lawn Tennis Tournament, Epsom, England	Grass	(United Kingdom) E.L. Bristow	6–2, 6–3
21.	16 – 18 July 1906	Shropshire Championship Lawn Tennis Tournament, Shrewsbury, England	Grass	(United Kingdom) Edward R. Allen	5–7, 6–0, 6–1, 3–6, 6–4
– (Note: It is not clear if it was a different tournament from the following one in the list)	26–29 July 1906	Marienbad Cup (Auersperg Prize), Austria-Hungary	Clay	(Germany) Otto Froitzheim	7–5, 6–0, 6–3
22.	26–30 July 1906	Marienbad Championship, Austria-Hungary	Clay	(Germany) Otto Froitzheim	6–2, 6–1, 6–0
23.	19 – July 1906	Franzensbad, Austria-Hungary	Clay	(Austria-Hungary) Ladislav Žemla	6–2, 6–3, ret.
24.	3 – 5 August 1906	City of Carlsbad Cup, Carlsbad, Austria-Hungary	Clay	(Austria-Hungary) Kurt von Wessely	6–2, 7–5, 6–4
25.	3 – 5 August 1906	Carlsbad, Austria-Hungary	Clay	Ackerland	6–2, 6–1, 6–3
26.	23 – 30 August 1906	The Homburg Cup, Germany	Clay	(Germany) Otto Froitzheim	6–1, 6–1, 6–4
27.	6 – 10 September 1906	Baden-Baden, Germany	Clay	(United Kingdom of Great Britain and Ireland) George Ball-Greene	6–1, 6–2, 6–1
28.	11 – 16 September 1906	South of England Championships, Eastbourne	Grass	(United Kingdom) Roderick McNair	6–2, 6–3, 6–2
29.	1 – 6 October 1906	London Covered Courts Championships, Queen's Club, London	Wood	(United Kingdom) George Caridia	6–3, 6–0, 6–3
30.	26 – 31 December 1906	Australasian Championships, Christchurch, New Zealand	Grass	(New Zealand) Francis Fisher	6–0, 6–4, 6–4
31.	December 1906 – 1 January 1907	New Zealand Championship, Christchurch	Grass	(New Zealand) Harold Parker	6–4, 2–6, 6–3, 6–1
32.	11 – 18 March 1907	South of France Championships, Nice, France	Clay	(United Kingdom) Major Ritchie	6–0, 6–0, 6–3
33.	28 March – 2 April 1907	French Covered Court Championships, Paris, France	Wood	(France) Max Decugis	4–6, 6–1, 1–6, 4–1, ret.
34.	4 –7 April 1907	Lyon Covered Court Championship, France	Asphalt	(France) Maurice Germot	6–1, 6–1, 6–4
35.	15 – 20 April 1907	Queen's Club Championship (Covered Court), England	Wood	(United Kingdom) Laurence Doherty	walkover
36.	6 – 11 May 1907	Wiesbaden Cup, Germany	Clay	(Germany) Adolf Hammacher	walkover
37.	6 – 11 May 1907	Championship of Wiesbaden, Germany	Clay	(United Kingdom) George Simond	6–1, 6–2, 6–3
38.	15 – 22 May 1907	Championship of Austria, Prague, Austria-Hungary	Clay	(Germany) Oscar Kreuzer	6–1, 6–1, 6–1
39.	24 – 30 May 1907	Vienna, Austria	Clay	(Austria-Hungary) Kurt von Wessely	6–3, 7–5, ret.
40.	31 May – 5 June 1907	Budapest International Championships, Hungary	Clay	(Austria-Hungary) Kurt von Wessely	6–4, 6–2, 6–4
41.	6 – 8 June 1907	Sheffield and Hallamshire, England	Grass	(United Kingdom) Reg Webster	6–0, 6–4, 6–1
42.	12 – 16 June 1907	Kent Championships, Beckenham	Grass	(United Kingdom) Arthur Gore	9–7, 6–2, 3–6, 0–6, 6–1
43.	17 – 22 June 1907	London Championships, England	Grass	(United Kingdom) Major Ritchie	6–2, 6–1, 6–0
– (Note: The All England Plate was a tournament played by the losers of the first two rounds of the Wimbledon Men's Singles tournament (in 1907 Wilding lost in five sets in the 2nd round to the future winner Norman Brookes))	June – July 1907	Wimbledon (All England Plate)	Grass	(Austria-Hungary) Kurt von Wessely	6–3, 6–4
44.	28 July – August 1907	Marienbad Cup (Auersperg Prize), Austria-Hungary	Clay	(Austria-Hungary) Kurt von Wessely	4–6, 10–8, 2–6, 7–5, 8–6
–	28 July – August 1907	Marienbad Championship, Austria-Hungary	Clay	(Canada) Kenneth Powell	6–0, 6–2
45.	4 – 8 August 1907	Franzensbad, Austria-Hungary	Clay	(Austria-Hungary) Kurt von Wessely	6–4, 6–0, 7–5
46.	August 1907	Carlsbad, Austria-Hungary	Clay	(Germany) Oscar Kreuzer	6–0, 6–1, 6–2
47.	1 – 8 September 1907	Baden-Baden, Germany	Clay	(Germany) Otto Froitzheim	6–3, 6–2, 6–3
48.	9 – 16 September 1907	Championship of Lucerne, Switzerland	Clay	(United Kingdom) Edward R. Allen	3–2 ret. (Note: The final was halted due to heavy rain. Allen retired the match in favour of Wilding. The Allen brothers had argued that Wilding should have been scratched from the tournament as he arrived three days late due to problems with his motorcycle.)
49.	February 1908	San Remo, Italy	Clay	(United Kingdom) S. Turton	6–0, 6–0, 6–1
50.	24 February – 1 March 1908	Monte Carlo, Monaco	Clay	(United Kingdom) Wilberforce Eaves	6–3, 2–6, 6–3, 4–6, 6–0
51.	9 – 17 March 1908	South of France Championships, Nice, France	Clay	(United Kingdom) Major Ritchie	6–0, 6–1, 6–2
52.	March 1908	Championship of Cannes, Cannes Beau Site, France	Clay	(United Kingdom) Major Ritchie	6–3, 6–4, 6–0
53.	March – April 1908	Cannes (Métropole), France	Clay	(France) H. Bertoult	6–1, 6–3, 6–1
54.	8 – 12 April 1908	Lyons Covered Courts Championships, France	Asphalt	(France) Maurice Germot	6–2, 6–1, 6–0
55.	14 – 19 May 1908	Wiesbaden (Cup), Germany	Clay	(Austria-Hungary) Rolf Kinzl	6–1, 6–1, 6–2
56.	14 – 19 May 1908	Wiesbaden Championship, Germany	Clay	(Germany) Otto Widmann	6–1, 6–0, 6–2
57.	May 1908	Lille, France	Clay	(United States) Clarence P. Dodge	6–0, 6–3, 6–2
58.	July 1908	Bordeaux, France	Clay	(France) Daniel Lawton	6–2, 6–0, 6–1
59.	July 1908	Sheffield and Hallamshire, England	Grass	(United Kingdom) Edward R. Allen	6–1, 6–4, 6–3
60.	August 1908	Dieppe, France	Clay	(United Kingdom) Charles P. Dixon	6–3, 6–1, 6–3
61.	2 – 6 September 1908	Baden-Baden, Germany	Clay	(Germany) Otto Froitzheim	6–4, 6–3, 6–4
62.	14 – 20 September 1908	South of England Championship, Eastbourne	Grass	(United Kingdom) George Hillyard	walkover
63.	19 – 23 November 1908	Victorian Championships, Melbourne, Australia	Grass	(United States) Fred Alexander	4–6, 6–0, 6–2, 6–2
64.	26 – 31 December 1908	New Zealand Championship, Nelson	Grass	(New Zealand) Harold Parker	6–2, 6–1, 6–4
65.	14 – 18 January 1909	New Plymouth, Taranaki, New Zealand	Grass	(New Zealand) Harold Parker	6–4, 5–3 ret.
66.	22 – 25 January 1909	Wairarapa Tournament, Masterton, New Zealand	Grass	(New Zealand) Cecil Cox	6–2, 6–4
67.	9 – 14 April 1909	Otago Championships, Dunedin, New Zealand	Grass	(New Zealand) Geoff Ollivier	3–6, 6–1, 6–0
68.	18 – 25 October 1909	Championship of Australasia and Western Australia, Perth, Australia	Grass	(Australia) Ernie Parker	6–1, 7–5, 6–2
69.	8 – 13 November 1909	Victorian Championships, Melbourne, Australia	Grass	(Australia) Norman Brookes	2–6, 3–6, 6–3, 6–3, 9–7
70.	27 – 29 December 1909	Championship of New Zealand, Auckland	Grass	(New Zealand) Francis Fisher	6–1, 6–1, 6–1
71.	20 – 26 April 1910	Championship of South Africa, Johannesburg	Clay	(Union of South Africa) Harold A. Kitson	6–0, 6–3, 6–4
72.	May 1910	Lille, France	Clay	(Belgium) A. Georges Watson	6–0, 6–1, 6–0
73.	May 1910	Brussels (Leopold Club), Belgium	Clay	(France) Max Decugis	6–1, 6–0, 6–2
74.	29 May 1910 (start date)	Brussels (International Lawn Tennis Singles), Belgium	Clay	(France) Max Decugis	6–1, 6–2, 6–0
75.	13 – 18 June 1910	London Championships Queen's, England	Grass	(United Kingdom) Major Ritchie	6–4, 6–3, 2–0 ret.
76.	20 June – 2 July 1910	Wimbledon, England	Grass	(United Kingdom) Arthur Gore	6–4, 7–5, 4–6, 6–2
77.	1 – 7 August 1910	Ostend, Belgium	Clay	(Belgium) Louis Trasenster	6–2, 6–2, 6–1
78.	9 – 13 August 1910	International Dutch Championships, The Hague	Clay	(Belgium) Paul de Borman	6–2, 6–1, 6–1
79.	22 – 28 August 1910	Évian-les-Bains, France	Clay	(France) Étienne Micard	6–3, 6–0, 6–1
– (Note: Tournament played on a private court belonging to Dr. Luling at Château de Sapicourt near Reims. Wilding won against Germot and Froitzheim.)	22 – 29 September 1910	Sapicourt Invitation Meeting, France	Clay		
80.	September 1910	Territet, Montreux, Switzerland	Clay	(France) Maurice Germot	6–1, 6–3
81.	10 – 15 October 1910	London Covered Courts Championships, Queen's Club, London, England	Wood	(United Kingdom) Arthur Lowe	6–2, 6–1, 6–3
82.	13 – 18 February 1911	Championships of the Italian Riviera, San Remo, Italy	Clay	(Germany) Friedrich W. Rahe	6–4, 2–6, 3–6, 6–4, 6–2
83.	27 February – 5 March 1911	Monte Carlo, Monaco	Clay	(France) Max Decugis	5–7, 1–6, 6–3, 6–0, 6–1
84.	6 – 12 March 1911	Championship of the Riviera, Menton, France	Clay	(France) Max Decugis	6–2, 6–3, 3–6, 5–7, 6–3 (Note: The "Illustriertes (Österreichisches) Sportblatt" has the score as 6–0, 6–4, 4–6, 1–6, 6–4.)
85.	14 – 22 March 1911	South of France Championships, Nice, France	Clay	(France) Max Decugis	9–7, 6–0, 6–3
86.	22 – 26 March 1911	Cannes (Beau Site), France	Clay	(Germany) Friedrich W. Rahe	6–1, 6–4, 6–2
87.	5 – 9 April 1911	Lyons Covered Courts Championships, France	Asphalt	(France) Félix Poulin	6–0, 6–1, 6–0
88.	12 – 17 June 1911	Kent Championships, Beckenham	Grass	(United Kingdom) Major Ritchie	6–0, 6–0, 6–3
89.	19 – 24 June 1911	London Championships, England	Grass	(United Kingdom) Alfred Beamish	7–5, 6–2, 6–3
90.	26 June – 8 July 1911	Wimbledon, London, England (Note: Up until 1921, the winners of the previous year's competition (except in the Ladies Doubles and Mixed Doubles) were automatically granted byes into the final round (then known as the challenge round). This led to many winners retaining their titles for successive years, as they were able to rest while their opponent competed from the start of the competition. From 1922, the title holders played through from the start of the championships. In 1912 at Wimbledon he had offered to "play through" instead of standing out to meet the All Comers' winner, though his offer was not accepted.)	Grass	(United Kingdom) Herbert Roper Barrett	6–4, 4–6, 2–6, 6–2, ret.
91.	12 – 18 February 1912	Monte Carlo, Monaco	Clay	(United Kingdom) C. Moore	6–3, 6–0, 6–0
–	March 1912	Menton (Formé-Bécherat Cup), France (Note: Tournament not added to title count as it had only four participants (Wilding, Wallis Meyers, Salm, de Martino).)	Clay	(United Kingdom) A. Wallis Myers	6–0, ret.
92.	10 – 15 June 1912	Kent Championships, Beckenham	Grass	(United Kingdom) Herbert Roper Barrett	6–2, 4–6, 6–2, 1–6, 6–2
93.	17 – 22 June 1912	Queen's Club Championships, London, England	Grass	(German Empire) Otto Froitzheim	walkover
94.	24 June – 8 July 1912	Wimbledon (Challenge Round)	Grass	(United Kingdom) Arthur Gore	6–4, 6–4, 4–6, 6–4
95.	August 1912	Deauville, France	Clay	(Germany) Heinrich Kleinschroth	6–2, 6–1, 7–5
96.	24 February – 3 March 1913	Monte Carlo, Monaco	Clay	(France) Félix Poulin	6–0, 6–2, 6–1
97.	3 – 7 March 1913	Menton (Formé-Bécherat Cup), France	Clay	(France) Max Decugis	6–4, 6–1, 3–6, 6–3
98.	3 – 9 March 1913	Riviera Championships, Menton, France	Clay	(Germany) Friedrich W. Rahe	6–2, 6–3, 6–1
99.	7 – 15 June 1913	World Hard Court Championships, Paris, France (Note: "Hard Court" in the Commonwealth countries (UK, Australia, ...) and Europe at the time meant "Clay Court")	Clay	(France) André Gobert	6–3, 6–3, 1–6, 6–4
100.	23 June – 4 July 1913	World Grass Court Championships, Wimbledon	Grass	(United States) Maurice McLoughlin	8–6, 6–3, 10–8
101.	26 – 31 August 1913	Deauville, France	Clay	Round robin (Note: After the initial two rounds the remaining semifinalists (Decugis, Doust, Rahe, Wilding) played each other in a round robin format. Wilding won all three of his matches and thus the Coupe de Deauville.)	
102.	8 September 1913	Le Touquet, France	Clay	(Australia) A.B. Jones	6–2, 6–8, 6–3, 6–1
103.	15 September 1913	Montreux Autumn Meeting, Territet, Switzerland	Clay	(United States) Craig Biddle	6–1, 6–2, 6–0
104.	22 September 1913	Montreux Palace Autumn Meeting, Switzerland	Clay	(Germany) Robert Kleinschroth	6–1, 6–4, 6–2
105.	September – October 1913	Lausanne Autumn Meeting, Switzerland	Clay	(Germany) Robert Kleinschroth	6–4, 6–2, 6–2
106.	13 – 20 October 1913	London Covered Courts Championships, Queen's Club, London, England	Wood	(United Kingdom) Arthur Lowe	7–5, 6–0, 6–2
107.	18 October 1913	World Covered Court Championships, Stockholm, Sweden	Wood	(France) Maurice Germot	5–7, 6–3, 6–2, 6–1
108.	January 1914	Cannes (Carlton) 1st meeting, France	Clay	(United Kingdom) Gordon Lowe	6–4, 6–1, 6–2
109.	27 January – 1 February 1914	Bordighera, Italy	Clay	(United Kingdom) Gordon Lowe	6–2, 7–5
110.	9 – 15 February 1914	Beaulieu-sur-Mer, France	Clay	(United Kingdom) Gordon Lowe	6–0, 6–2, 6–3
111.	17 – 20 February 1914	Côte d'Azur Championships, Cannes (Beau Site), France	Clay	(United Kingdom) Gordon Lowe	6–3, 6–2, 6–4
112.	23 February – 2 March 1914	Monte Carlo, Monaco	Clay	(United Kingdom) Gordon Lowe	6–2, 6–3, 6–2
113.	3 – 7 March 1914	Riviera Championship, Menton, France	Clay	(United Kingdom) Gordon Lowe	6–1, 6–4, 6–2
114.	9 – 17 March 1914	South of France Championships, Nice, France	Clay	(United Kingdom) Gordon Lowe	6–4, 6–4, 1–6, 6–2
115.	18 – 25 March 1914	The Country Club, Nice, France	Clay	(France) Félix Poulin	10–8, 6–2, 6–4
116.	23 – 30 March 1914	Championships of Cannes, Cannes (Beau Site), France	Clay	(Australia) Norman Brookes	6–4, 6–2, 6–1
117.	6 – 12 April 1914	Cannes (Carlton Club) 2nd meeting, France	Clay	(Australia) Norman Brookes	6–2, 6–2, 6–2
118.	May – 8 June 1914	World Hard Court Championships, Paris, France	Clay	(Austria-Hungary) Ludwig von Salm-Hoogstraeten	6–0, 6–2, 6–4

== Davis Cup ==
Between 1905 and 1914 Wilding played in 11 ties for the Australasia team in the Davis Cup and won 21 out of 30 matches; 15 of his 21 singles matches and 6 out of 9 doubles. He was a member of the victorious teams in 1907, 1908, 1909 and 1914.

Edition	Zone	Round	Date	Opponents	Tie score	Location	Surface	Match	Opponent	W–L	Rubber score
1905	WG	SF	13–15 Jul 1905	Austria	5–0	London	Grass	Singles 2	Kurt von Wessely	W	4–6, 6–3, 7–5, 6–1
1905	WG	SF	13–15 Jul 1905	Austria	5–0	London	Grass	Singles 5	Rolf Kinzl	W	6–3, 4—6, 6–2, 6–4
1905	WG	F	17–19 Jul 1905	United States	0–5	London	Grass	Singles 2	Bill Larned	L	3–6, 2–6, 6–4
1905	WG	F	17–19 Jul 1905	United States	0–5	London	Grass	Singles 4	Beals Wright	L	3–6, 3–6
1906	CR	F	7–9 Jun 1906	United States	2–3	Monmouthshire	Grass	Singles 2	Raymond Little	W	6–2, 8–6, 6–1
1906	CR	F	7–9 Jun 1906	United States	2–3	Monmouthshire	Grass	Doubles (Poidevin)	Raymond Little; Holcombe Ward	L	5–7, 2–6, 4–6
1906	CR	F	7–9 Jun 1906	United States	2–3	Monmouthshire	Grass	Singles	Holcombe Ward	W	6–3, 3–6, 0–6, 6–4, 8–6
1907	WG	F	13–16 Jul 1907	United States	3–2	London	Grass	Singles 2	Karl Behr	W	1–6, 6–3, 3–6, 7–5, 6–3
1907	WG	F	13–16 Jul 1907	United States	3–2	London	Grass	Doubles (Brookes)	Karl Behr; Beals Wright	L	6–3, 10–12, 6–4, 4–6, 3–6
1907	WG	F	13–16 Jul 1907	United States	3–2	London	Grass	Singles 5	Beals Wright	L	8–6, 3–6, 3–6, 5–7
1907	CR	F	20–23 Jul 1907	Great Britain	3–2	London	Grass	Singles 2	Herbert Roper Barrett	W	1–6, 6–4, 6–3, 7–5
1907	CR	F	20–23 Jul 1907	Great Britain	3–2	London	Grass	Doubles (Brookes)	Arthur Gore; Herbert Roper Barrett	L	6–3, 6–4, 5–7, 2–6, 11–13
1907	CR	F	20–23 Jul 1907	Great Britain	3–2	London	Grass	Singles 5	Arthur Gore	L	6–3, 3–6, 5–7, 2–6
1908	CR	F	27–30 Nov 1908	United States	3–2	Melbourne	Grass	Singles 2	Beals Wright	L	6–3, 5–7, 3–6, 1–6
1908	CR	F	27–30 Nov 1908	United States	3–2	Melbourne	Grass	Doubles (Brookes)	Fred Alexander; Beals Wright	W	6–4, 6–2, 5–7, 2–6, 6–4
1908	CR	F	27–30 Nov 1908	United States	3–2	Melbourne	Grass	Singles 5	Fred Alexander	W	6–3, 6–4, 6–1
1909	CR	F	27–30 Nov 1909	United States	5–0	Sydney	Grass	Singles 2	Melville Long	W	6–2, 7–5, 6–1
1909	CR	F	27–30 Nov 1909	United States	5–0	Sydney	Grass	Doubles (Brookes)	Melville Long; Maurice McLoughlin	W	12–10, 9–7, 6–3
1909	CR	F	27–30 Nov 1909	United States	5–0	Sydney	Grass	Singles 5	Maurice McLoughlin	W	3–6, 8–6, 6–2, 6–3
1914	WG	QF	23–25 Jul 1914	Canada	5–0	Lake Forest	Grass	Singles 2	Robert Powell	W	6–1, 6–2, 6–2
1914	WG	QF	23–25 Jul 1914	Canada	5–0	Lake Forest	Grass	Doubles (Brookes)	Robert Powell; Bernard Schwengers	W	6–4, 6–3, 6–4
1914	WG	QF	23–25 Jul 1914	Canada	5–0	Lake Forest	Grass	Singles 5	Bernard Schwengers	W	7–5, 6–3, 6–1
1914	WG	SF	30 Jul – 1 Aug 1914	Germany	5–0	Pittsburgh	Grass	Singles 2	Oskar Kreuzer	W	6–2, 6–2, 6–4
1914	WG	SF	30 Jul – 1 Aug 1914	Germany	5–0	Pittsburgh	Grass	Doubles (Brookes)	Otto Froitzheim; Oskar Kreuzer	W	6–1, 6–1, 6–2
1914	WG	SF	30 Jul – 1 Aug 1914	Germany	5–0	Pittsburgh	Grass	Singles 5	Otto Froitzheim	W	6–3, 6–4, 6–2
1914	WG	F	6–8 Aug 1914	Great Britain	3–0	Boston	Grass	Singles 2	Arthur Lowe	W	6–3, 6–1, 16–14
1914	WG	F	6–8 Aug 1914	Great Britain	3–0	Boston	Grass	Doubles (Brookes)	Theodore Mavrogordato; James Cecil Parke	W	6–1, 6–0, 6–4
1914	CR	F	13–15 Jul 1914	United States	3–2	New York City	Grass	Singles 1	R. Norris Williams	W	7–5, 6–2, 6–3
1914	CR	F	13–15 Jul 1914	United States	3–2	New York City	Grass	Doubles (Brookes)	Thomas Bundy; Maurice McLoughlin	W	6–3, 8–6, 9–7
1914	CR	F	13–15 Jul 1914	United States	3–2	New York City	Grass	Singles 5	Maurice McLoughlin	L	2–6, 3–6, 6–2, 2–6

== Sources ==
- Wilding, Anthony F. (1913). On the Court and Off. New York: Doubleday. OL 7144244M.
- Wallis Myers, A. (1916). Captain Anthony Wilding. London: Hodder and Stoughton. OCLC 1203033. OL 6611035M.
- Richardson, Len and Shelley (2005). Anthony Wilding, A Sporting Life. Canterbury: Canterbury University Press. ISBN 978-1877257018.
