= All-time tennis records – Men's singles =

All-time records and statistics of the men's singles in Tennis

This article covers the period from 1877 to present. Before the beginning of the Open Era in April 1968, only amateurs were allowed to compete in established tennis tournaments, including the four Grand Slam tournaments (also known as the majors). Wimbledon, the oldest of the majors, was founded in 1877, followed by the US Open in 1881, the French Open in 1891 and the Australian Open in 1905. Beginning in 1905 and continuing to the present day, all four majors have been played yearly, with the exception of during the two World Wars, 1986 for the Australian Open, and 2020 for Wimbledon. The Australian Open is the first major of the year (January), followed by the French Open (May–June), Wimbledon (June–July) and the US Open (August–September). There was no prize money and players were compensated for travel expenses only. A player who wins all four majors, in singles or as part of a doubles team, in the same calendar year is said to have achieved a "Calendar Year Grand Slam". If the player wins all four consecutively, but not in the same calendar year, it is called a "Non-Calendar Year Grand Slam". Winning all four at some point in a career, even if not consecutively, is referred to as a "Career Grand Slam". Winning the four majors and a gold medal in tennis at the Summer Olympics in the same calendar year has been called a "Golden Slam" since 1988. Winning all four majors plus an Olympic gold at some point in a career, even if not consecutively, is referred to as a "Career Golden Slam". Winning the year-end championship while also having won a Golden Slam is referred to as a "Super Slam". Winning all four majors, an Olympic gold, and the year-end championships at some point in a career, even if not consecutively, is referred to as a "Career Super Slam". Winning the four majors in all three disciplines a player is eligible for–singles, doubles and mixed doubles–is considered winning a "boxed set" of Grand Slam titles.

Prior to 1924, the major tennis championships, governed by the International Lawn Tennis Federation (ILTF), were the World Hard Court Championships, World Grass Court Championships (Wimbledon), and World Covered Court Championships.

Many top tennis players turned professional before the Open Era to play legally for prize money. They played in separate professional events and were banned from competing any of the four Grand Slam tournaments. They mostly competed on pro tours involving head-to-head competition, but also in professional tournaments as the biggest events on the pro tour. In addition to the head-to-head tours, there were the annual professional tournaments called "Championship tournaments" (known retrospectively as "professional majors" or "professional Grand Slams" where the world's top professional players usually played. These tournaments held a certain tradition and longevity.

The oldest of these three professional majors, was the U.S. Pro Tennis Championships, played at a variety of different venues and on a variety of different surfaces, between 1925 and 1999, although it was no longer a major after 1967. Between 1954 and 1962, the U.S. Pro was played indoors in Cleveland and was billed as the World Professional Championships. The most prestigious of the three was generally the Wembley Championships. Played between 1934 and 1990, at the Wembley Arena in England, it was unofficially usually considered the world's championship until 1967. The third professional major was the French Pro Championship, played between 1934 and 1968, on the clay courts of Roland Garros, apart from 1963 to 1967, when it was played on the indoor wood courts of Stade Coubertin.

The Open Era of tennis began in 1968, when the Grand Slam tournaments agreed to allow professional players to compete with amateurs. A professional tennis tour was created for the entire year, where everyone could compete. This meant that the division that had existed for many years between these two groups had finally come to an end, which made the tennis world into one unified competition. The first tournament to go "Open" started on 22 April 1968 was the British Hard Court Championships at The West Hants Club in Bournemouth, England. The first Grand Slam tournament to do so was the 1968 French Open, starting on 27 May.

== Analysis of records ==
Today, the ultimate pursuit in tennis is to win the Grand Slam; winning all four Grand Slam tournaments in the same calendar year. In 1982, the International Tennis Federation (ITF) broadened the definition of the Grand Slam as meaning any four straight major victories, including the ones spanning two calendar years that became known as the non-calendar year Grand Slam, though it later reversed its definition.

In the history of men's tennis, only two players have won the calendar Grand Slam, Don Budge (1938) and Rod Laver (1962 and 1969). Budge remains the sole player to have won six majors in a row (1937–1938). In the Open Era, only one player has achieved the non-calendar year Grand Slam, Novak Djokovic (2015–2016). This is followed by a career Grand Slam, a feat achieved by a player winning each of the majors during their career, which eight players have done. Winning just one of these major tournaments in a year is a sought-after achievement but winning all four or more consecutively, if we apply Prochnow's (2018) analysis retrospectively in Budge's case, transforms a player into a legend.

When we reflect on the modern era of the sport, tennis has clear separations during its history, such as the first official majors sanctioned by the world governing body of tennis its separate tours (amateur and professional), the eligibility to compete at Grand Slam majors or the surface aspects of the tournaments. In 1913, the ILTF created its first tennis majors, three world championship tournaments that were abolished by 1923. In the history of those early majors, only one player won all three in the same year, Anthony Wilding, arguably the first world champion. In 1927, the men's game was separated, leading to the creation of what are now referred to as the pro majors. During a period of 40 years, only two players achieved the calendar Pro Grand Slam in the history of the professional tour, Ken Rosewall (1963) and Laver (1967). Prior to 1968, only amateurs could enter the Grand Slam tournaments. This was changed in 1968, after which both professionals and amateurs could compete for the tennis majors.

There are also several other facets to take into consideration in defining great tennis players, such as winning all calendar year majors consecutively on offer at the time (World Champs and Pro Slams) on three different surfaces. Three players achieved this distinction between 1913 and 1967, Wilding, Rosewall and Laver. Only those same three players did so not only by surface, but also different environments (indoors and outdoors). When the professional majors were abolished in 1967, the Grand Slam majors were still only being played on two exclusive surfaces, grass and clay. In 1978, the US Open switched surface to a hardcourt thus re-creating a third unique surface. This is arguably the best date in defining the beginning of the modern era of tennis. In this new modern era, only one player (Djokovic) has won all four majors in a row. Only two players have achieved the new term, a "Surface Slam", winning three consecutive majors on three distinct surfaces, that being Rafael Nadal in 2010 and Novak Djokovic in 2021. To have accomplished any of these feats in a group of tournaments originating over 100 years ago underscores the degree of difficulty involved.

These are some of the important records since the start of the first Grand Slam tournament held at the Wimbledon Championships. All statistics are based on data provided by the ATP Tour website, the ITF and other available sources, even if this isn't a complete list due to the time period involved.

== Grand Slam tournaments ==
=== Career totals ===
Active players in boldface.

#	Titles
24	**Novak Djokovic**
22	Rafael Nadal
20	Roger Federer
14	Pete Sampras
12	Roy Emerson
11	Rod Laver
11	Björn Borg
10	Bill Tilden
8	Fred Perry
8	Ken Rosewall
8	Jimmy Connors
8	Ivan Lendl
8	Andre Agassi

#	Finals
38	**Novak Djokovic**
31	Roger Federer
30	Rafael Nadal
19	Ivan Lendl
18	Pete Sampras
17	Rod Laver
16	Ken Rosewall
16	Björn Borg
15	Bill Tilden
15	Roy Emerson
15	Jimmy Connors
15	Andre Agassi

#	Semifinals
55	**Novak Djokovic**
46	Roger Federer
38	Rafael Nadal
31	Jimmy Connors
28	Ivan Lendl
26	Andre Agassi
25	Ken Rosewall
23	Pete Sampras
21	Andy Murray
20	Bill Tilden

#	Quarterfinals
66	**Novak Djokovic**
58	Roger Federer
47	Rafael Nadal
41	Jimmy Connors
37	Roy Emerson
36	Andre Agassi
34	/ Ivan Lendl
30	Ken Rosewall
30	Andy Murray
29	Pete Sampras

#	Match wins
409	**Novak Djokovic**
369	Roger Federer
314	Rafael Nadal
233	Jimmy Connors
224	Andre Agassi
222	/ Ivan Lendl
210	Roy Emerson
203	Pete Sampras
200	Andy Murray
minimum 200 wins

%	W–L	Match record
89.76	114–13	Bill Tilden
89.24	141–17	Björn Borg
87.71	314–44	Rafael Nadal
87.39	409–59	**Novak Djokovic**
87.07	101–15	Fred Perry
86.01	369–60	Roger Federer
84.23	203–38	Pete Sampras
83.41	171–34	Ken Rosewall
82.94	141–29	Rod Laver
82.62	233–49	Jimmy Connors
minimum 100 wins

#	Appearances
84	(Serbia) **Novak Djokovic**
81	(Switzerland) Roger Federer
81	(Spain) Feliciano López
78	(Switzerland) **Stan Wawrinka**
75	(France) Richard Gasquet
71	Fernando Verdasco
71	(France) **Gaël Monfils**
70	(France) Fabrice Santoro
69	(Russia) Mikhail Youzhny
68	(Germany) Philipp Kohlschreiber
68	(Spain) Rafael Nadal

=== Grand Slam achievements ===
==== Grand Slam ====
Grand Slam	Player	First–last tournament
Grand Slam	Don Budge	1938 Australian Championships–U.S. Championships
Grand Slam	Rod Laver	1962 Australian Championships–U.S. Championships
Grand Slam	Rod Laver (2)	1969 Australian Open–US Open
Grand Slam	all four major titles consecutively (in a calendar year)	

==== Non-calendar-year Grand Slam ====
Non-calendar-year Grand Slam	Player	First–last tournament
Non-calendar-year Grand Slam	Novak Djokovic	2015 Wimbledon Championships–2016 French Open
Non-calendar-year Grand Slam	all four major titles consecutively (not in a calendar year)	

==== Career Grand Slam ====
CGS	Player	Event of completion
CGS	Fred Perry	1935 French Championships
CGS	Don Budge	1938 French Championships
CGS	Rod Laver	1962 U.S. Championships
CGS	Roy Emerson	1964 Wimbledon Championships
CGS	Roy Emerson (2)	1967 French Championships
CGS	Rod Laver (2)	1969 US Open
CGS	Andre Agassi	1999 French Open
CGS	Roger Federer	2009 French Open
CGS	Rafael Nadal	2010 US Open
CGS	Novak Djokovic	2016 French Open
CGS	Novak Djokovic (2)	2021 French Open
CGS	Rafael Nadal (2)	2022 Australian Open
CGS	Novak Djokovic (3)	2023 French Open
CGS	Carlos Alcaraz	2026 Australian Open
CGS	each Grand Slam title at least once	

=== Consecutive totals ===
==== Grand Slam tournaments consecutive streaks ====
Active streaks in boldface.

#	Titles
6	Don Budge
4	Bill Tilden
4	Rod Laver
4	Rod Laver (2)
4	Novak Djokovic
3	Laurence Doherty
3	Jack Crawford
3	Tony Trabert
3	Lew Hoad
3	Roy Emerson
3	Pete Sampras
3	Roger Federer
3	Roger Federer (2)
3	Rafael Nadal
3	Novak Djokovic (2)
3	Novak Djokovic (3)
3	Novak Djokovic (4)

#	Finals
10	Roger Federer
8	Roger Federer (2)
7	Jack Crawford
6	Don Budge
6	Rod Laver
6	Novak Djokovic
5	Fred Perry
5	Frank Sedgman
5	Fred Stolle
5	Rafael Nadal
5	Novak Djokovic (2)
5	Jannik Sinner

#	Semifinals
23	Roger Federer
14	Novak Djokovic
10	Rod Laver
10	Ivan Lendl
9	Novak Djokovic (2)
8	Ashley Cooper
7	Jack Crawford
7	Rafael Nadal
6	Fred Perry
6	Don Budge
6	Tom Brown
6	Lew Hoad
6	Ivan Lendl
6	**Jannik Sinner**

#	Quarterfinals
36	Roger Federer
28	Novak Djokovic
14	Roy Emerson
14	Ivan Lendl
12	Neale Fraser
11	Rafael Nadal
10	Vic Seixas
10	Rod Laver
10	Pete Sampras
10	David Ferrer
10	Rafael Nadal (2)

#	Consecutive appearances
79	Feliciano López
67	Fernando Verdasco
66	Andreas Seppi
65	Roger Federer
58	Grigor Dimitrov
56	Wayne Ferreira
54	Stefan Edberg
52	Tomáš Berdych
51	Novak Djokovic
50	David Ferrer
50	Guillermo García López
50	Stan Wawrinka

==== Grand Slam tournaments non-consecutive streaks ====
Player skipped one or more Grand Slam tournaments during his streak.

#	Titles
8	Bill Tilden
6	William Renshaw
5	Laurence Doherty
5	William Larned
5	Anthony Wilding
4	Richard Sears
4	Reginald Doherty

#	Finals
10	Bill Tilden
8	Jack Crawford
8	Rod Laver
7	Don Budge
6	William Renshaw
6	Wilfred Baddeley
6	Anthony Wilding
6	Maurice McLoughlin
6	Gottfried von Cramm
6	Jimmy Connors
6	Björn Borg

#	Semifinals
14	Jack Crawford
12	Rod Laver
11	Jimmy Connors
10	Bill Tilden
10	Bill Tilden (2)
9	Fred Perry
9	Ken Rosewall
8	Don Budge

#	Quarterfinals
27	Jimmy Connors
21	Bill Tilden
18	Andy Murray
17	Jack Crawford
16	Rafael Nadal
13	William Larned
12	Fred Perry
12	Rod Laver
12	Björn Borg

==== Grand Slam matches/final win streaks ====
Streaks can be across non-consecutive tournaments.

Matches	Player	Years
51	Bill Tilden	1920–1926
37	Don Budge	1937–1938
31	Rod Laver	1962–1968
30	Novak Djokovic	2015–2016
29	Rod Laver (2)	1969–1970
27	Roger Federer	2005–2006
27	Roger Federer (2)	2006–2007
27	Novak Djokovic (2)	2011–2012
27	Novak Djokovic (3)	2021
27	Novak Djokovic (4)	2022–2023

Final Win	Player	Years
10	Roy Emerson	1963–1967
8	Bill Tilden	1920–1925
8	Pete Sampras	1995–2000
7	Richard Sears	1881–1887
7	William Renshaw	1881–1889
7	Roger Federer	2003–2006
7	Rafael Nadal	2008–2011
6	Laurence Doherty	1902–1906
6	Don Budge	1937–1938
5	William Larned	1907–1911
5	Anthony Wilding	1909–1913
5	Jack Crawford	1931–1933
5	Tony Trabert	1953–1955
5	Rod Laver	1968–1969
5	John Newcombe	1970–1975
5	Novak Djokovic	2018–2020
5	Rafael Nadal (2)	2019–2022
5	Carlos Alcaraz	2022–2025

=== Per Grand Slam tournament totals ===
==== Titles per Grand Slam tournament (3+ titles) ====
#	Australian
10	**Novak Djokovic**
6	Roy Emerson
6	Roger Federer
4	Jack Crawford
4	Ken Rosewall
4	Andre Agassi
3	James Anderson
3	Adrian Quist
3	Rod Laver
3	Mats Wilander

#	French
14	Rafael Nadal
6	Björn Borg
4	Henri Cochet
3	René Lacoste
3	Ivan Lendl
3	Mats Wilander
3	Gustavo Kuerten
3	**Novak Djokovic**

#	Wimbledon
8	Roger Federer
7	William Renshaw
7	Pete Sampras
7	**Novak Djokovic**
5	Laurence Doherty
5	Björn Borg
4	Reginald Doherty
4	Anthony Wilding
4	Rod Laver
3	Wilfred Baddeley
3	Arthur Gore
3	Bill Tilden
3	Fred Perry
3	John Newcombe
3	John McEnroe
3	Boris Becker

#	United States
7	Richard Sears
7	William Larned
7	Bill Tilden
5	Jimmy Connors
5	Pete Sampras
5	Roger Federer
4	Robert Wrenn
4	John McEnroe
4	Rafael Nadal
4	**Novak Djokovic**
3	Oliver Campbell
3	Malcolm Whitman
3	Fred Perry
3	Ivan Lendl

==== Consecutive titles per Grand Slam tournament ====
#	Australian
5	Roy Emerson
3	Jack Crawford
3	Novak Djokovic
3	Novak Djokovic (2)
2	James Anderson
2	Frank Sedgman
2	Ashley Cooper
2	Ken Rosewall
2	Guillermo Vilas
2	/ Johan Kriek
2	Mats Wilander
2	Stefan Edberg
2	Ivan Lendl
2	Jim Courier
2	Andre Agassi
2	Roger Federer
2	Novak Djokovic (3)
2	Roger Federer (2)
2	Jannik Sinner

#	French
5	Rafael Nadal
4	Björn Borg
4	Rafael Nadal (2)
4	Rafael Nadal (3)
2	Frank Parker
2	Jaroslav Drobný
2	Tony Trabert
2	Nicola Pietrangeli
2	Jan Kodeš
2	Björn Borg (2)
2	Ivan Lendl
2	Jim Courier
2	Sergi Bruguera
2	Gustavo Kuerten
2	Carlos Alcaraz

#	Wimbledon
6	William Renshaw
5	Laurence Doherty
5	Björn Borg
5	Roger Federer
4	Reginald Doherty
4	Anthony Wilding
4	Pete Sampras
4	Novak Djokovic
3	Fred Perry
3	Pete Sampras (2)
2	John Hartley
2	Wilfred Baddeley
2	Joshua Pim
2	Arthur Gore
2	Bill Tilden
2	Don Budge
2	Lew Hoad
2	Rod Laver
2	Roy Emerson
2	Rod Laver (2)
2	John Newcombe
2	John McEnroe
2	Boris Becker
2	Novak Djokovic (2)
2	Carlos Alcaraz
2	Jannik Sinner

#	United States
7	Richard Sears
6	Bill Tilden
5	William Larned
5	Roger Federer
3	Oliver Campbell
3	Malcolm Whitman
3	John McEnroe
3	Ivan Lendl
2	Henry Slocum
2	Robert Wrenn
2	Robert Wrenn (2)
2	William Larned (2)
2	Maurice McLoughlin
2	Robert Lindley Murray
2	René Lacoste
2	Ellsworth Vines
2	Fred Perry
2	Don Budge
2	Frank Parker
2	Jack Kramer
2	Pancho Gonzales
2	Frank Sedgman
2	Neale Fraser
2	Jimmy Connors
2	Stefan Edberg
2	Pete Sampras
2	Patrick Rafter

==== Finals per Grand Slam tournament ====
#	Australian
11	**Novak Djokovic**
7	Jack Crawford
7	John Bromwich
7	Roy Emerson
7	Roger Federer
6	Rafael Nadal
5	Ken Rosewall
5	Stefan Edberg
5	Andy Murray
4	Gerald Patterson
4	Horace Rice
4	Adrian Quist
4	Rod Laver
4	Arthur Ashe
4	Mats Wilander
4	Ivan Lendl
4	Andre Agassi

#	French
14	Rafael Nadal
7	**Novak Djokovic**
6	Björn Borg
5	René Lacoste
5	Henri Cochet
5	/ Jaroslav Drobný
5	Ivan Lendl
5	Mats Wilander
5	Roger Federer
4	Nicola Pietrangeli
4	Guillermo Vilas

#	Wimbledon
12	Roger Federer
10	**Novak Djokovic**
8	William Renshaw
8	Arthur Gore
7	Boris Becker
7	Pete Sampras
6	Herbert Lawford
6	Wilfred Baddeley
6	Laurence Doherty
6	Rod Laver
6	Björn Borg
6	Jimmy Connors

#	United States
10	Bill Tilden
10	**Novak Djokovic**
9	William Larned
8	Bill Johnston
8	Ivan Lendl
8	Pete Sampras
7	Richard Sears
7	Jimmy Connors
7	Roger Federer
6	Andre Agassi

==== Runners-up per Grand Slam tournament ====
#	Australian
5	John Bromwich
5	Andy Murray
4	Rafael Nadal
3	Horace Rice
3	Gerald Patterson
3	Harry Hopman
3	Jack Crawford
3	Neale Fraser
3	Arthur Ashe
3	Stefan Edberg
3	**Daniil Medvedev**

#	French
4	**Novak Djokovic**
4	Roger Federer
3	Jaroslav Drobný
3	Guillermo Vilas
2	Jean Borotra
2	Bill Tilden
2	René Lacoste
2	Eric Sturgess
2	Sven Davidson
2	Luis Ayala
2	Nicola Pietrangeli
2	Tony Roche
2	Ivan Lendl
2	Mats Wilander
2	Andre Agassi
2	Àlex Corretja
2	Robin Söderling
2	Dominic Thiem
2	**Casper Ruud**

#	Wimbledon
5	Herbert Lawford
5	Arthur Gore
4	Ernest Renshaw
4	Ken Rosewall
4	Jimmy Connors
4	Boris Becker
4	Roger Federer
3	Wilfred Baddeley
3	Frank Riseley
3	Jean Borotra
3	Gottfried von Cramm
3	Fred Stolle
3	Goran Ivanišević
3	Andy Roddick
3	Rafael Nadal
3	**Novak Djokovic**

#	United States
6	Bill Johnston
6	**Novak Djokovic**
5	Ivan Lendl
4	Björn Borg
4	Andre Agassi
3	Frederick Hovey
3	Beals Wright
3	Maurice McLoughlin
3	Bill Tilden
3	Pete Sampras

==== Match wins per Grand Slam tournament ====
#	Australian
104	**Novak Djokovic**
102	Roger Federer
77	Rafael Nadal
56	Stefan Edberg
52	Jack Crawford
51	Andy Murray
48	/ Ivan Lendl
48	Andre Agassi
47	Tomáš Berdych
46	Roy Emerson
46	John Newcombe

#	French
112	Rafael Nadal
103	**Novak Djokovic**
73	Roger Federer
56	Guillermo Vilas
53	/ Ivan Lendl
51	Andre Agassi
50	Nicola Pietrangeli
49	Björn Borg
47	Mats Wilander
46	/ Jaroslav Drobný
46	**Stan Wawrinka**

#	Wimbledon
107	**Novak Djokovic**
105	Roger Federer
84	Jimmy Connors
71	Boris Becker
64	Arthur Gore
63	Pete Sampras
62	Major Ritchie
61	Andy Murray
60	Roy Emerson
59	John McEnroe

#	United States
98	Jimmy Connors
95	**Novak Djokovic**
89	Roger Federer
79	Andre Agassi
75	Vic Seixas
73	/ Ivan Lendl
71	Bill Tilden
71	Pete Sampras
69	R. Norris Williams
67	Rafael Nadal

==== Match win streak per Grand Slam tournament ====
#	Australian	Years
33	**Novak Djokovic**	2019–24
30	Roy Emerson	1963–68
26	Andre Agassi	2000–04
25	Novak Djokovic (2)	2011–14
20	Ivan Lendl	1989–91

#	French	Years
39	Rafael Nadal	2010–15
35	Rafael Nadal (2)	2016–21
31	Rafael Nadal (3)	2005–08
28	Björn Borg	1978–81
20	Jim Courier	1991–93

#	Wimbledon	Years
41	Björn Borg	1976–81
40	Roger Federer	2003–08
34	**Novak Djokovic**	2018–23
31	Rod Laver	1961–70
31	Pete Sampras	1997–2001

#	United States	Years
42	Bill Tilden	1920–26
40	Roger Federer	2004–09
27	Ivan Lendl	1985–88
25	John McEnroe	1979–83
20	Maurice McLoughlin	1912–14

==== Match winning percentage per Grand Slam tournament ====
Australian	%	W–L
Andre Agassi	90.57	48–5
**Novak Djokovic**	90.43	104–11
Roger Federer	87.18	102–15
Stefan Edberg	84.85	56–10
Mats Wilander	83.72	36–7
Roy Emerson	83.64	46–9
Rafael Nadal	82.80	77–16
/ Ivan Lendl	82.76	48–10
Jim Courier	81.40	35–8
Ken Rosewall	81.13	43–10
minimum 30 wins

French	%	W–L
Rafael Nadal	96.55	112–4
Björn Borg	96.08	49–2
Henri Cochet	90.24	37–4
Manuel Santana	85.37	35–6
**Novak Djokovic**	85.12	103–18
Mats Wilander	83.93	47–9
Eric Sturgess	83.33	30–6
Gustavo Kuerten	81.82	36–8
Jim Courier	81.63	40–9
/ Ivan Lendl	81.54	53–12
minimum 30 wins

Wimbledon	%	W–L
Björn Borg	92.73	51–4
Bill Tilden	91.18	31–3
Pete Sampras	90.00	63–7
**Novak Djokovic**	89.17	107–13
Roger Federer	88.24	105–14
Fred Perry	87.80	36–5
Rod Laver	87.72	50–7
Boris Becker	85.54	71–12
John McEnroe	84.29	59–11
Andy Murray	82.43	61–13
minimum 30 wins

United States	%	W–L
Bill Tilden	91.02	71–7
Fred Perry	89.47	34–4
Pete Sampras	88.75	71–9
Maurice McLoughlin	87.72	50–7
Neale Fraser	86.49	32–5
Roger Federer	86.41	89–14
**Novak Djokovic**	85.59	95–16
Ken Rosewall	85.07	57–10
Rafael Nadal	84.81	67–12
John McEnroe	84.42	65–12
minimum 30 wins

=== Court type totals ===
Current through the 2026 Wimbledon Championships.

==== Match wins in Grand Slam tournaments per court type ====
#	Hardcourt
199	**Novak Djokovic**
191	Roger Federer
144	Rafael Nadal
127	Andre Agassi
116	Pete Sampras
105	Ivan Lendl
100	Andy Murray
91	**Stan Wawrinka**
84	Stefan Edberg
81	Andy Roddick

#	Clay
112	Rafael Nadal
103	**Novak Djokovic**
73	Guillermo Vilas
73	Roger Federer
63	Björn Borg
59	Jimmy Connors
53	Ivan Lendl
52	Jan Kodeš
51	Andre Agassi
50	Nicola Pietrangeli

#	Grass
166	Roy Emerson
145	Ken Rosewall
136	John Newcombe
113	Rod Laver
112	Vic Seixas
107	Jimmy Connors
107	**Novak Djokovic**
106	Arthur Ashe
105	Roger Federer
100	Bill Tilden

==== Winning percentage in Grand Slam tournaments per court type ====
Hardcourt	%	W–L
**Novak Djokovic**	88.05	199–27
Roger Federer	86.82	191–29
Pete Sampras	86.57	116–18
Jimmy Connors	85.90	67–11
Ivan Lendl	85.37	105–18
**Carlos Alcaraz**	85.19	46–8
Björn Borg	84.62	22–4
Andre Agassi	84.11	127–24
John McEnroe	83.91	73–14
Rafael Nadal	83.72	144–28
minimum 20 wins

Clay	%	W–L
Rafael Nadal	96.55	112–4
Björn Borg	92.65	63–5
René Lacoste	90.63	29–3
Henri Cochet	90.24	37–4
**Carlos Alcaraz**	89.29	25–3
Ken Rosewall	86.67	26–4
**Novak Djokovic**	85.12	103–18
Mats Wilander	83.93	47–9
Eric Sturgess	83.33	30–6
Gustavo Kuerten	81.82	36–8
**Alexander Zverev**	81.82	45–10
minimum 20 wins

Grass	%	W–L
Don Budge	91.23	52–5
Bill Tilden	90.91	100–10
Pete Sampras	90.00	63–7
Björn Borg	88.89	56–7
**Carlos Alcaraz**	88.89	24–3
Fred Perry	88.76	79–10
**Novak Djokovic**	88.43	107–14
Roger Federer	88.24	105–14
Jack Crawford	87.25	89–13
**Jannik Sinner**	86.67	26–4
minimum 20 wins

=== Season totals ===
==== Four majors in one calendar year ====
4 Slam wins	Years	
Rod Laver	2	1962, 1969
Don Budge	1	1938
3 Slam wins & 1 final	Years	
**Novak Djokovic**	3	2015, 2021, 2023
Roger Federer	2	2006, 2007
Jack Crawford	1	1933
Lew Hoad	1	1956
2 Slam wins & 2 finals	Years	
Frank Sedgman	1	1952
Roger Federer	1	2009
**Jannik Sinner**	1	2025
All 4 finals	Years	
**Novak Djokovic**	3	2015, 2021, 2023
Roger Federer	3	2006, 2007, 2009
Rod Laver	2	1962, 1969
Jack Crawford	1	1933
Don Budge	1	1938
Frank Sedgman	1	1952
Lew Hoad	1	1956
**Jannik Sinner**	1	2025
All 4 semifinals	Years	
**Novak Djokovic**	7	2011–13, 15, 21, 23, 25
Roger Federer	5	2005–09
Rod Laver	3	1961–62, 69
Ashley Cooper	2	1957–58
Rafael Nadal	2	2008, 19
Jack Crawford	1	1933
Fred Perry	1	1935
Don Budge	1	1938
Frank Sedgman	1	1952
Vic Seixas	1	1953
Tony Trabert	1	1955
Lew Hoad	1	1956
Tony Roche	1	1969
Ivan Lendl	1	1987
Andy Murray	1	2011
**Jannik Sinner**	1	2025
**Alexander Zverev**	1	2026

All 4 quarterfinals	Years	
**Novak Djokovic**	9	2010–15, 21, 23, 25
Roger Federer	8	2005–12
Roy Emerson	5	1959, 61, 64–66
Rafael Nadal	5	2008, 2010–11, 18–19
Andy Murray	4	2011–12, 14, 16
Neale Fraser	3	1958–60
Rod Laver	3	1961–62, 69
Ivan Lendl	3	1983, 87–88
Fred Perry	2	1934–35
Dick Savitt	2	1951–52
Frank Sedgman	2	1951–52
Vic Seixas	2	1953–54
Ashley Cooper	2	1957–58
Andre Agassi	2	1995, 01
David Ferrer	2	2012–13
**Jannik Sinner**	2	2024-25
Jack Crawford	1	1933
Don Budge	1	1938
Vic Seixas	1	1953
Ken Rosewall	1	1953
Tony Trabert	1	1955
Lew Hoad	1	1956
John Newcombe	1	1969
Tony Roche	1	1969
John McEnroe	1	1985
Mats Wilander	1	1988
Stefan Edberg	1	1991
Pete Sampras	1	1993
**Stan Wawrinka**	1	2015
**Carlos Alcaraz**	1	2025
**Alexander Zverev**	1	2026

==== Three majors ====
3 slam wins	Years	
**Novak Djokovic**	4	2011, 15, 21, 23
Roger Federer	3	2004, 06–07
Jack Crawford	1	1933
Fred Perry	1	1934
Tony Trabert	1	1955
Lew Hoad	1	1956
Ashley Cooper	1	1958
Roy Emerson	1	1964
Jimmy Connors	1	1974
Mats Wilander	1	1988
Rafael Nadal	1	2010

2 slam wins & 1 final	Years	
Fred Perry	2	1935–36
Björn Borg	2	1978, 80
Ivan Lendl	2	1986–87
Rafael Nadal	2	2017, 19
Henri Cochet	1	1928
Bobby Riggs	1	1939
Alex Olmedo	1	1959
Neale Fraser	1	1960
Guillermo Vilas	1	1977
John McEnroe	1	1984
Pete Sampras	1	1995
Andre Agassi	1	1999
**Novak Djokovic**	1	2016
**Carlos Alcaraz**	1	2025
**Alexander Zverev**	1	2026

1 slam win & 2 finals	Years	
Rod Laver	2	1960–61
**Novak Djokovic**	2	2012–13
Vic Seixas	1	1953
Ken Rosewall	1	1956
Ashley Cooper	1	1957
Fred Stolle	1	1965
Björn Borg	1	1981
Jim Courier	1	1993
Roger Federer	1	2008
Rafael Nadal	1	2011
Andy Murray	1	2016

3 slam finals (all losses)	Years	
Jack Crawford	1	1934
Roy Emerson	1	1962
Fred Stolle	1	1964
Jimmy Connors	1	1975

=== Other ===
==== Consecutive majors ====
===== Four consecutive =====
Australian / French / Wimbledon / United States	Years	
Rod Laver	2	1962, 69
Don Budge	1	1938

===== Three consecutive =====
Australian / French / Wimbledon	Years	
Jack Crawford	1	1933
Lew Hoad	1	1956
**Novak Djokovic**	1	2021

French / Wimbledon / United States	Years	
Tony Trabert	1	1955
Rafael Nadal	1	2010

===== Two consecutive =====
Players who won three or four consecutive titles are not listed here.

Australian/French	Years	
Roy Emerson	2	1963, 67
**Novak Djokovic**	2	2016, 23
Ken Rosewall	1	1953
Mats Wilander	1	1988
Jim Courier	1	1992
Rafael Nadal	1	2022

French/Wimbledon	Years	
Björn Borg	3	1978–80
Rafael Nadal	2	2008, 2010
René Lacoste	1	1925
Fred Perry	1	1935
Budge Patty	1	1950
Roger Federer	1	2009
**Novak Djokovic**	1	2021
**Carlos Alcaraz**	1	2024

Wimbledon/United States	Years	
Roger Federer	4	2004–07
**Novak Djokovic**	3	2011, 15, 18
Bill Tilden	2	1920–21
Fred Perry	2	1934–36
Jimmy Connors	2	1974, 82
John McEnroe	2	1981, 84
Pete Sampras	2	1993, 95
Laurence Doherty	1	1903
Ellsworth Vines	1	1932
Don Budge	1	1937
Bobby Riggs	1	1939
Jack Kramer	1	1947 (*)
Frank Sedgman	1	1952
Ashley Cooper	1	1958
Neale Fraser	1	1960
Roy Emerson	1	1964
John Newcombe	1	1967
Boris Becker	1	1989

(*) In 1947 the French Championships were held after Wimbledon.

==== Non-consecutive majors ====
===== Three non-consecutive =====
Australian/French/United States	Years	
Mats Wilander	1	1988
**Novak Djokovic**	1	2023

Australian/Wimbledon/United States	Years	
Roger Federer	3	2004, 06–07
**Novak Djokovic**	2	2011, 15
Fred Perry	1	1934
Ashley Cooper	1	1958
Roy Emerson	1	1964
Jimmy Connors	1	1974

===== Two non-consecutive =====
Players who won three or four titles are not listed here.

Australian & Wimbledon	Years	
Roy Emerson	2	1961–65
Pete Sampras	2	1994, 97
Dick Savitt	1	1951
Alex Olmedo	1	1959
Roger Federer	1	2017
**Novak Djokovic**	1	2019
**Jannik Sinner**	1	2025

Australian & United States	Year
John Newcombe	1973
**Jannik Sinner**	2024

French & United States	Years	
Rafael Nadal	3	2013, 17, 19
Ivan Lendl	2	1986–87
René Lacoste	1	1927
Henri Cochet	1	1928
Guillermo Vilas	1	1977
Andre Agassi	1	1999
**Carlos Alcaraz**	1	2025
**Alexander Zverev**	1	2026

==== Single season winning percentage ====
Match winning	%	W–L	Year
Rod Laver	100	26–0	1969
Rod Laver (2)	100	25–0	1962
Don Budge	100	24–0	1938
Jimmy Connors	100	20–0	1974
Roger Federer	96.43	27–1	2006
Novak Djokovic	96.43	27–1	2015
Novak Djokovic (2)	96.43	27–1	2021
Novak Djokovic (3)	96.43	27–1	2023
Lew Hoad	96.30	26–1	1956
Roger Federer (2)	96.30	26–1	2007
Jack Crawford	96.15	25–1	1933
Mats Wilander	96.15	25–1	1988
Rafael Nadal	96.15	25–1	2010
Novak Djokovic (4)	96.15	25–1	2011
minimum 20 wins

==== Consecutive titles ====
Note: In a row spanning more than one year

6 consecutive majors
Wimbledon / United States / Australian / French / Wimbledon / United States	Year
Don Budge	1937–38

4 consecutive majors
Wimbledon / United States / Wimbledon / United States	Year (*)
Bill Tilden	1920–21
Wimbledon / United States / Australian / French	Year
**Novak Djokovic**	2015–16

3 consecutive majors
Wimbledon / United States / Wimbledon	Year (*)
Laurence Doherty	1903–04
Wimbledon / United States / Australian	Year
Roy Emerson	1964–65
Pete Sampras	1993–94
Roger Federer	2005–06
Roger Federer (2)	2006–07
**Novak Djokovic**	2011–12
**Novak Djokovic** (2)	2018–19

(*) Only from 1925 onwards each year had four Grand Slam tournaments.

==== Winning a Grand Slam singles tournament without losing a set ====
Player	Times	Grand Slam Tournaments			
Player	Times	Australian Open	French Open	Wimbledon	US Open
Rafael Nadal	4	—	2008, 2010, 2017, 2020	—	—
Richard Sears	3	—	—	—	1881, 1882, 1883
Tony Trabert	3	—	—	1955	1953, 1955
Björn Borg	3	—	1978, 1980	1976	—
Don Budge	2	1938	—	1938	—
Roger Federer	2	2007	—	2017	—
Laurence Doherty	1	—	—	—	1903
Holcombe Ward	1	—	—	—	1904
William Larned	1	—	—	—	1907
Anthony Wilding	1	1909	—	—	—
Rodney Heath	1	1910	—	—	—
Pat O'Hara Wood	1	1923	—	—	—
John Bromwich	1	1939	—	—	—
Frank Parker	1	—	—	—	1945
Frank Sedgman	1	—	—	—	1952
Neale Fraser	1	—	—	—	1960
Chuck McKinley	1	—	—	1963	—
Roy Emerson	1	1964	—	—	—
Ken Rosewall	1	1971	—	—	—
Ilie Năstase	1	—	1973	—	—

==== Grand Slam season streaks ====
#	3 titles per season	Years
2	Roger Federer	2006–2007

#	2+ titles per season	Years
4	Roger Federer	2004–2007
3	Fred Perry	1934–1936
3	Roy Emerson	1963–1965
3	Björn Borg	1978–1980
3	Pete Sampras	1993–1995
2	Bill Tilden	1920–1921
2	Don Budge	1937–1938
2	John McEnroe	1980–1981
2	Novak Djokovic	2015–2016
2	Novak Djokovic (2)	2018–2019
2	Jannik Sinner	2024–2025
2	Carlos Alcaraz	2024–2025

#	1+ title per season	Years
10	Rafael Nadal	2005–2014
8	Björn Borg	1974–1981
8	Pete Sampras	1993–2000
8	Roger Federer	2003–2010
7	Richard Sears	1881–1887
6	William Renshaw	1881–1886
6	Bill Tilden	1920–1925
6	Novak Djokovic	2011–2016
6	Novak Djokovic (2)	2018–2023

#	1+ final per season	Years
11	Ivan Lendl	1981–1991
11	Pete Sampras	1992–2002
10	Roger Federer	2003–2012
10	Rafael Nadal	2005–2014

== Pro Slam (majors) ==
- Overall totals for early Professional majors (French Pro, Wembley Pro, US Pro).

=== Career totals ===
#	Titles
15	Ken Rosewall
13	Pancho Gonzales
8	Rod Laver
4	Karel Koželuh
4	Vinny Richards
4	Hans Nüsslein
4	Ellsworth Vines
4	Don Budge
3	Bill Tilden
3	Bobby Riggs
3	Pancho Segura

#	Finals
19	Pancho Gonzales
19	Ken Rosewall
14	Rod Laver
13	Pancho Segura
8	Karel Koželuh
8	Hans Nüsslein
8	Don Budge
7	Lew Hoad
6	Vinny Richards
6	Bill Tilden
6	Bobby Riggs
6	Frank Sedgman

#	Semifinals
27	Ken Rosewall
26	Pancho Gonzales
24	Pancho Segura
16	Don Budge
15	Bill Tilden
14	Frank Sedgman
14	Rod Laver
11	Frank Kovacs
11	Tony Trabert
10	Karel Koželuh
10	Bobby Riggs
10	Lew Hoad
10	Andrés Gimeno

#	Quarterfinals
36	Pancho Segura
27	Pancho Gonzales
27	Ken Rosewall
19	Lew Hoad
19	Andrés Gimeno
18	Bill Tilden
18	Bobby Riggs
17	Don Budge
17	Tony Trabert
17	Frank Sedgman
17	Butch Buchholz

#	Appearances
37	Pancho Segura
27	Pancho Gonzales
27	Ken Rosewall
23	Lew Hoad
20	Bobby Riggs
20	Andrés Gimeno
20	Butch Buchholz
19	Tony Trabert
19	Frank Sedgman
18	Bill Tilden
18	Don Budge
18	Mal Anderson
18	Mike Davies

#	Match wins
71	Ken Rosewall
65	Pancho Gonzales
63	Pancho Segura
40	Don Budge
38	Rod Laver
37	Bill Tilden
36	Bobby Riggs
35	Vinny Richards

%	W–L	Match record
85.54	71–12	Ken Rosewall
84.44	38–7	Rod Laver
82.28	65–14	Pancho Gonzales
74.07	40–14	Don Budge
minimum 25 wins

=== Pro Slam achievements ===
Pro Slam	Player	U.S.	Wembley	French
Pro Slam	Ken Rosewall	1963	1963	1963
Pro Slam	Rod Laver	1967	1967	1967
Pro Slam	all three Pro Slam titles simultaneously (in a calendar year)			

2 titles + 1 final	Year
Pancho Gonzales	1956
Rod Laver	1964
Rod Laver	1966

1 title + 2 finals	Year
Rod Laver	1965
Ken Rosewall	1966

=== Pro Slam tournament totals ===
==== Titles per tournament ====
#	US Pro
9	Pancho Gonzales
4	Vinny Richards
3	Karel Koželuh
3	Bobby Riggs
3	Pancho Segura
3	Rod Laver

#	Wembley Pro
4	Pancho Gonzales
4	Ken Rosewall
4	Rod Laver
2	Frank Sedgman
2	Ellsworth Vines

#	French Pro
8	Ken Rosewall
2	Tony Trabert
2	Hans Nüsslein

==== Finals per tournament ====
#	US Pro
12	Pancho Gonzales
9	Pancho Segura
7	Karel Koželuh
6	Vinny Richards
6	Don Budge

#	Wembley Pro
7	Ken Rosewall
5	Pancho Gonzales
4	Pancho Segura
4	Rod Laver

#	French Pro
8	Ken Rosewall
5	Rod Laver
3	Pancho Gonzales
3	Robert Ramillon
3	Martin Plaa
3	Hans Nüsslein

==== Match record per tournament ====
%	W–L	US Pro
87.80	36–5	Pancho Gonzales
87.50	14–2	Rod Laver
77.27	19–7	Fred Perry
75.00	12-4	Ken Rosewall
72.97	27–10	Don Budge
72.50	29–11	Bobby Riggs
70.37	19–8	Bill Tilden
minimum 10 wins

%	W–L	Wembley Pro
92.31	12–1	Rod Laver
82.86	29–6	Ken Rosewall
81.48	22–5	Pancho Gonzales
71.43	10–4	Don Budge
minimum 10 wins

%	W–L	French Pro
93.75	30–2	Ken Rosewall
75.00	12–4	Rod Laver
minimum 10 wins

=== Pro Slam tournaments streaks ===
#	Titles
5	Ken Rosewall
4	Pancho Gonzales
3	Don Budge
3	Rod Laver
3	Rod Laver (2)

#	Finals
13	Pancho Gonzales
12	Rod Laver
5	Bobby Riggs
5	Ken Rosewall
4	Pancho Segura
4	Ken Rosewall (2)

#	Semifinals
18	Pancho Gonzales
17	Ken Rosewall
12	Rod Laver
8	Bobby Riggs
5	Bill Tilden
5	Bill Tilden (2)
5	Don Budge
5	Don Budge (2)
5	Pancho Segura

#	Quarterfinals
18	Pancho Gonzales
17	Ken Rosewall
15	Butch Buchholz
15	Rod Laver
12	Pancho Segura
9	Bobby Riggs

== Overall majors ==
- Major tournaments consist of the combined total of Grand Slams, Pro Slams and early ILTF majors (WHCC, WCCC & WGCC).

=== Career totals ===
#	Titles
24	Novak Djokovic
23	Ken Rosewall
22	Rafael Nadal
20	Roger Federer
19	Rod Laver
15	Pancho Gonzales
14	Bill Tilden
14	Pete Sampras
12	Roy Emerson
11	Henri Cochet
11	Björn Borg

#	Finals
38	Novak Djokovic
35	Ken Rosewall
31	Rod Laver
31	Roger Federer
30	Rafael Nadal
22	Bill Tilden
21	Pancho Gonzales
19	Ivan Lendl
18	Pete Sampras
16	Björn Borg

#	Semifinals
55	Novak Djokovic
52	Ken Rosewall
46	Roger Federer
38	Rafael Nadal
36	Bill Tilden
32	Rod Laver
31	Jimmy Connors
30	Pancho Gonzales
28	Pancho Segura
28	Ivan Lendl

#	Quarterfinals
66	Novak Djokovic
58	Roger Federer
57	Ken Rosewall
47	Rafael Nadal
42	Pancho Segura
41	Jimmy Connors
40	Bill Tilden
37	Roy Emerson
36	Andre Agassi
35	Rod Laver

#	Appearances
83	Novak Djokovic
81	Roger Federer
81	Feliciano López
77	Stan Wawrinka
75	Richard Gasquet
71	Fernando Verdasco
70	Fabrice Santoro
70	Gaël Monfils
69	Ken Rosewall
69	Mikhail Youzhny

==== Matches ====
#	Match wins
409	Novak Djokovic
369	Roger Federer
314	Rafael Nadal
242	Ken Rosewall
233	Jimmy Connors
224	Andre Agassi
222	/ Ivan Lendl
210	Roy Emerson
203	Pete Sampras
200	Andy Murray

%	W–L	Match winning
89.24	141–17	Björn Borg
87.71	314–44	Rafael Nadal
87.39	409–59	Novak Djokovic
86.81	125–19	Henri Cochet
86.01	369–60	Roger Federer
84.51	120–22	Fred Perry
84.23	203–38	Pete Sampras
84.03	242–46	Ken Rosewall
83.76	98–19	Don Budge
83.51	157–31	Bill Tilden
minimum 95 wins

Note: The draw of Pro majors was significantly smaller than the traditional Grand Slam tournaments; usually they only had 16 or even fewer professional players. Though they were the top 16 ranked players in the world at the time, this meant only four (or even fewer) rounds of play instead of the modern six or seven rounds.

== All tournaments ==
=== Career titles & finals ===
Titles	Player
200	Rod Laver
147	Ken Rosewall
147	/ Jaroslav Drobný
139	Josiah Ritchie
138	Bill Tilden
118	Anthony Wilding
113	Pancho Gonzales
110	Roy Emerson
109	Jimmy Connors
103	Roger Federer
102	Novak Djokovic

Finals	Player
286	Rod Laver
251	Ken Rosewall
230	Josiah Ritchie
203	/ Jaroslav Drobný
192	Bill Tilden
174	Roy Allen
173	Roy Emerson
164	Jimmy Connors
159	Pancho Gonzales
157	Roger Federer
146	Novak Djokovic

==== Career tournament streaks ====
Titles	Player	Years
19	Anthony Wilding	1914–1915
19	Bill Tilden	1924–1925
15	Jack Crawford	1934–1935
14	Don Budge	1937–1938
12	Budge Patty	1954–1955
10	Gordon Lowe	1914–1920
10	Tony Trabert	1955
10	Björn Borg	1979–1980
9	James Cecil Parke	1913
9	Henri Cochet	1925–1926
9	Bobby Riggs	1938
9	József Asbóth	1940–1946
9	Bill Talbert	1945
9	Jaroslav Drobný	1952

Finals	Player	Years
52	Bill Tilden	1922–1926
28	Anthony Wilding	1908–1910
26	John Bromwich	1940–1947
25	Fred Perry	1936–1941
25	Frank Sedgman	1951–1953
22	Herbert Roper Barrett	1904–1908
20	Don Budge	1936–1938
20	Jaroslav Drobný	1951–1952
19	Jack Crawford	1930–1932
19	Budge Patty	1954–1955
19	Roy Emerson	1961–1962

=== Career matches ===
#	Played
2521	Ken Rosewall
2232	Bill Tilden
2227	Rod Laver
2117	Pancho Segura
2020	Pancho Gonzales
1813	Roy Emerson
1645	Josiah Ritchie
1579	Onny Parun
1559	Arthur Ashe
1557	Jimmy Connors
1526	Roger Federer

#	Match wins
1811	Ken Rosewall
1726	Bill Tilden
1689	Rod Laver
1397	Roy Emerson
1368	Pancho Gonzales
1292	Pancho Segura
1274	Jimmy Connors
1274	Josiah Ritchie
1251	Roger Federer
1188	Arthur Ashe
1184	**Novak Djokovic**

Match winning	%	W–L
Anthony Wilding	91.77	636–57
Laurence Doherty	88.52	293–38
Bill Johnston	87.28	350–51
René Lacoste	85.90	262–43
Herbert Roper Barrett	85.13	332–58
Sydney Howard Smith	85.03	318–56
Henry Mayes	84.77	412–74
John Bromwich	84.21	480–90
Eric Sturgess	84.15	292–55
Jean Borotra	83.74	654–127
**Novak Djokovic**	82.97	1184–243
minimum 250 matches

==== Career match streaks ====
#	Player	Year(s)	ref
98	Bill Tilden	1924–25 (Note: Tilden career match streak started South Atlantic Championships 1924 ended South Orange tournament 1925.)	
92	Don Budge	1937–38	
80	Anthony Wilding	1913–14 (Note: Wilding career match streak started World Hard Court Championships 1913 ended World Hard Court Championships 1914.)	
70	Laurence Doherty	1902–04 (Note: Doherty career match streak started South of France Championships 1902 ended London Covered Court Championships 1904.)	
65	Bill Tilden (2)	1930 (Note: Tilden career match streak started South of France Championships 1930 ended French Championships 1930.)	
61	Bill Tilden (3)	1920–21 (Note: Tilden career match streak started Wimbledon Championships 1920 ended Rhode Island Championships 1921.)	
61	Bill Tilden (4)	1925–26 (Note: Tilden career match streak started Church Cup 1925 ended U.S. National Indoors Championships 1926.)	
55	Roy Emerson	1964 (Note: Emerson career match streak started Condo De Godo 1964 ended Queensland Championships 1964.)	
49	Bobby Riggs	1938 (Note: Riggs career match streak started Missouri Valley tournament 1938 ended Meadow Club tournament 1938.)	
49	Björn Borg	1978 (Note: Borg career match streak started Davis Cup 1978 ended US Open tournament 1978.)	

#	Finals won	Years
24	Roger Federer	2003–2005
15	Björn Borg	1979–1980
14	Don Budge	1937–1938
14	Rod Laver	1973–1975
14	Rafael Nadal	2005–2006
13	Rod Laver (2)	1969
13	Björn Borg (2)	1976–1977
12	John McEnroe	1980–1981
12	John McEnroe (2)	1984–1985
11	Thomas Muster	1994–1995
11	Stan Wawrinka	2013–2016
11	Rafael Nadal (2)	2019–2022

=== Career records per court type ===
Note: Wood has not been used since 1970 and Carpet has not been used since 2009.

==== Titles per court type ====
#	Hard
73	**Novak Djokovic**
71	Roger Federer
46	Andre Agassi
43	Jimmy Connors
41	Pete Sampras
34	Andy Murray
30	Ivan Lendl
28	Rod Laver
25	Rafael Nadal
23	Stefan Edberg

#	Clay
92	/ Jaroslav Drobný
76	Bill Tilden
75	Anthony Wilding
65	Henri Cochet
63	Rafael Nadal
62	Josiah Ritchie
60	Budge Patty
56	Manuel Santana
54	Roy Emerson
49	Guillermo Vilas
49	Frank Parker

#	Grass
82	Roy Allen
56	Josiah Ritchie
52	Sydney H. Smith
51	Herbert R. Barrett
49	Bill Tilden
44	William Larned
44	Jack Crawford
44	Rod Laver
41	Roy Emerson
40	John Bromwich

#	Carpet
45	Jimmy Connors
43	John McEnroe
34	/ Ivan Lendl
22	Boris Becker
22	Rod Laver
22	Björn Borg
18	Arthur Ashe
13	Pete Sampras
13	Goran Ivanišević
12	Stan Smith

#	Wood
23	Jean Borotra
20	Ken Rosewall
18	Rod Laver
15	Bill Tilden
9	George Caridia
8	Laurence Doherty
7	Ernest Lewis
7	Anthony Wilding
5	André Gobert
4	Jaroslav Drobný
4	Robert Wilson

#	Outdoor
114	Anthony Wilding
114	Rod Laver
107	/ Jaroslav Drobný
98	Ken Rosewall
90	Rafael Nadal
82	**Novak Djokovic**
77	Roger Federer
67	Bill Tilden
56	Jimmy Connors
55	Guillermo Vilas

#	Indoor
55	Rod Laver
53	Jimmy Connors
52	John McEnroe
48	Pancho Gonzales
47	Jean Borotra
42	/ Ivan Lendl
42	Ken Rosewall
33	Arthur Ashe
30	Boris Becker
29	Stan Smith

==== Consecutive titles per court type ====
#	Hard	Years
12	Pancho Gonzales	1955–57
12	Budge Patty	1954–56
9	André Gobert	1919–21
9	Jean Borotra	1929–30
9	Fred Perry	1931–34
9	Ellsworth Vines	1934–38
9	Don Budge	1935–37
9	John McEnroe	1983–84
9	Ivan Lendl	1985–86
9	Roger Federer	2005–06

#	Clay	Years
22	Anthony Wilding	1912–14
21	Bill Tilden	1922–25
13	Rafael Nadal	2005–07
10	József Asbóth	1940–46
10	Björn Borg	1979–81
9	Maurice McLoughlin	1907–12
8	Josiah Ritchie	1906–07
8	Ichiya Kumagae	1919–20
8	Gottfried von Cramm	1935–36
8	Jaroslav Drobný	1952
8	Guillermo Vilas	1977

#	Grass	Years
13	Jack Crawford	1930–32
10	Ken Rosewall	1967–69
10	Roger Federer	2003–08
9	Anthony Wilding	1908–09
9	Don Budge	1921–22
8	Brian Norton	1921–22
8	James Parke	1913
8	Ken Rosewall (2)	1961–63
7	Augustus Kearney	1899–1901
7	Gordon Lowe	1914–21
7	Gerald Patterson	1921–22

#	Outdoor	Years
20	Bill Tilden	1923–25
19	Don Budge	1936–38
17	Anthony Wilding	1913–14
15	Jack Crawford	1931–32
13	József Asbóth	1940–46
9	James Cecil Parke	1913
9	Francis Lowe	1914–20
9	Bobby Riggs	1938
8	Jaroslav Drobný	1952
8	Björn Borg	1977–78

#	Indoor	Years
15	John McEnroe	1985
14	Ivan Lendl	1983
13	Bill Tilden	1930–33
9	Jean Borotra	1929–30
9	André Gobert	1919–21
8	Budge Patty	1955–56
8	Pancho Gonzales	1955–57
7	Jimmy Connors	1973
7	Arthur Ashe	1975
7	Novak Djokovic	2012–15

==== Consecutive finals per court type ====
#	Hard	Years
29	Pancho Gonzales	1951–57
22	Fred Perry	1930–41
20	Ivan Lendl	1981–83
17	Bill Tilden	1918–26
15	Jaroslav Drobný	1950–55
15	Budge Patty	1954–57
14	Rod Laver	1964–65
14	Roger Federer	2005–06
13	Jean Borotra	1927–30
13	Jimmy Connors	1975–76
13	**Novak Djokovic**	2015–16

#	Clay	Years
43	Bill Tilden	1922–29
34	Anthony Wilding	1907–12
23	Bill Talbert	1942–46
21	Pancho Segura	1940–46
19	Ichiya Kumagae	1916–21
18	Rafael Nadal	2005–08
17	Henri Cochet	1925–27
16	Josiah Ritchie	1903–05
16	Frank Parker	1940–46
15	Frank Kovacs	1946–51

#	Grass	Years
23	Bill Tilden	1930–32
19	Herbert Roper Barrett	1904–08
19	John Bromwich	1940–47
16	Frank Sedgman	1951–54
15	Jack Crawford	1930–32
14	Anthony Wilding	1908–10
14	Roy Allen	1907–08
13	Fred Stolle	1963–64
13	Roger Federer	2003–10
12	Joshua Pim	1890–91
12	Malcolm Whitman	1899–1902

#	Outdoor	Years
59	Bill Tilden	1922–26
28	Anthony Wilding	1908–10
19	Jack Crawford	1930–32
16	József Asbóth	1940–47
15	Roger Federer	2005–06
15	Novak Djokovic	2015–16
15	Francis Lowe	1920–21
14	Don Budge	1937–38
13	Guillermo Vilas	1977
13	Bobby Riggs	1937

#	Indoor	Years
20	Bill Tilden	1926–34
19	Ivan Lendl	1983–86
17	John McEnroe	1983–85
15	Budge Patty	1954–57
15	Don Budge	1934–47
13	Jean Borotra	1927–30
13	Jaroslav Drobný	1950–55
13	Rod Laver	1965–67
12	Pancho Gonzales	1950–53
11	André Gobert	1919–22

==== Career match wins per court type ====
#	Hard
813	Pancho Gonzales
783	Roger Federer
748	**Novak Djokovic**
743	Ken Rosewall
706	Pancho Segura
675	Rod Laver
668	Andre Agassi
662	/ Ivan Lendl
525	Jimmy Connors
518	Rafael Nadal

#	Clay
679	Guillermo Vilas
660	/ Jaroslav Drobný
583	Bill Tilden
569	Manuel Orantes
544	Nicola Pietrangeli
509	Gardnar Mulloy
499	Budge Patty
493	Manuel Santana
484	Rafael Nadal
480	Roy Emerson

#	Grass
572	Josiah Ritchie
566	Roy Emerson
556	Ken Rosewall
542	Roy Allen
489	Jack Crawford
445	Bill Tilden
431	Rod Laver
401	John Newcombe
379	Adrian Quist
378	John Bromwich

#	Carpet
391	Jimmy Connors
349	John McEnroe
286	Arthur Ashe
258	/ Ivan Lendl
257	Boris Becker
223	Ilie Năstase
216	Brian Gottfried
205	Stan Smith
196	Vitas Gerulaitis
192	Goran Ivanišević

#	Outdoor
985	Rafael Nadal
980	**Novak Djokovic**
953	Roger Federer
817	Guillermo Vilas
787	Jimmy Connors
727	/ Ivan Lendl
702	Andre Agassi
628	David Ferrer
598	Manuel Orantes
584	Ilie Năstase

#	Indoor
628	Pancho Gonzales
583	Pancho Segura
487	Jimmy Connors
450	Ken Rosewall
423	John McEnroe
402	Jean Borotra
368	Arthur Ashe
353	Rod Laver
348	Jack Kramer
341	/ Ivan Lendl

==== Career match winning % per court type ====
Hard	%	W–L
Jean Borotra	86.21	400–64
Budge Patty	84.29	177–33
**Novak Djokovic**	83.95	748–143
Roger Federer	83.48	783–155
Ted Schroeder	83.13	133–27
Jimmy Connors	83.05	490–100
/ Ivan Lendl	82.82	400–83
Rod Laver	82.61	152–32
John McEnroe	81.64	289–65
Pete Sampras	80.64	429–103
minimum 100 wins

Clay	%	W–L
Anthony Wilding	96.01	313–13
Frank Parker	91.56	369–34
Rafael Nadal	90.47	484–51
Henry Mayes	87.45	223–32
René Lacoste	87.34	138–20
Bobby Riggs	87.09	317–47
Eric Sturgess	86.29	151–24
Björn Borg	86.10	285–46
Manuel Santana	84.56	493–90
Henri Cochet	84.21	400–75
minimum 100 wins

Grass	%	W–L
Bill Tilden	88.29	445–49
Anthony Wilding	88.17	246–33
Maurice McLoughlin	87.95	146–20
Laurence Doherty	87.20	184–27
Roger Federer	86.88	192–29
John McEnroe	85.82	121–20
Sydney H. Smith	85.60	315–53
**Novak Djokovic**	85.53	130–22
Herbert R. Barrett	85.00	272–48
Bill Johnston	84.86	213–38
minimum 100 wins

Carpet	%	W–L
John McEnroe	84.30	349–65
/ Ivan Lendl	82.75	259–54
Jimmy Connors	82.66	391–82
Björn Borg	81.17	181–42
Boris Becker	80.12	258–64
Rod Laver	78.20	208–58
Arthur Ashe	76.88	286–86
Pete Sampras	75.94	142–45
Yevgeny Kafelnikov	73.45	166–60
Stan Smith	71.43	205–82
minimum 100 wins (not used since 2009)

Outdoor	%	W–L
Anthony Wilding	92.46	564–46
Bill Johnston	87.19	354–52
Bobby Riggs	85.56	640–108
René Lacoste	85.42	205–35
Rafael Nadal	84.33	985–183
Bill Tilden	83.96	1089–208
Frank Parker	83.692	739–144
**Novak Djokovic**	83.689	980–191
Björn Borg	83.33	430–86
Henri Cochet	83.03	510–104
minimum 200 wins

Indoor	%	W–L
Jean Borotra	86.04	413–67
John McEnroe	85.28	423–73
/ Ivan Lendl	82.97	341–70
Jimmy Connors	81.57	487–110
Roger Federer	80.98	298–70
Björn Borg	80.58	224–54
Boris Becker	79.84	297–75
**Novak Djokovic**	79.69	204–52
/ Jaroslav Drobný	79.30	180–47
Pete Sampras	77.74	213–61
minimum 100 wins

==== Career match win streaks per court type ====
#	Hard	Years
56	Roger Federer	2005–06
36	Roger Federer (2)	2006–07
35	Novak Djokovic	2010–11

#	Clay	Years
120	Anthony Wilding	1910–14
115	Bill Tilden	1922–26
81	Rafael Nadal	2005–07
68	Laurence Doherty	1897–1907
66	Reginald Doherty	1895–1909

#	Grass	Years
75	Laurence Doherty	1902–10
65	Roger Federer	2003–08
54	Anthony Wilding	1908–11
45	Norman Brookes	1905–08
41	Björn Borg	1976–81

#	Carpet	Years
66	Ivan Lendl	1981–83
66	John McEnroe	1983–85
32	Arthur Ashe	1975

=== Situational stats ===
After winning 1st set	%	W–L
**Novak Djokovic**	95.51	1022–48
Rafael Nadal	94.73	953–53
Björn Borg	93.94	574–37
Roger Federer	93.20	1111–81
Jimmy Connors	92.84	1141–88
John McEnroe	92.31	804–67
Juan Martín del Potro	92.29	371–31
Andy Murray	92.28	610–51
/ Ivan Lendl	91.60	949–87
Andre Agassi	91.03	751–74
minimum 350 wins

After losing 1st set	%	W–L
**Novak Djokovic**	45.38	162–195
Björn Borg	43.72	80–103
Pete Sampras	43.56	115–149
/ Ivan Lendl	43.43	119–155
Rafael Nadal	42.05	127–175
Roger Federer	41.92	140–194
Boris Becker	41.08	99–142
Jimmy Connors	40.55	133–195
Lleyton Hewitt	39.35	122–188
Andy Murray	37.94	129–211
minimum 80 wins

Deciding set	%	W–L
Björn Borg	73.38	102–37
John McEnroe	72.83	126–47
Kei Nishikori	72.48	158–60
**Novak Djokovic**	71.34	229–92
Rafael Nadal	68.77	185–84
/ Johan Kriek	68.55	85–39
Jimmy Connors	68.32	179–83
Pete Sampras	68.23	189–88
Stan Smith	67.93	161–76
Andy Murray	67.50	189–91
minimum 80 wins

5th set record	%	W–L
Björn Borg	81.82	27–6
Kei Nishikori	78.38	29–8
**Novak Djokovic**	76.36	42–13
Aaron Krickstein	75.68	28–9
Tomáš Berdych	70.00	21–9
John Newcombe	69.77	30–13
Wayne Ferreira	69.23	27–12
Jonas Björkman	69.05	29–13
Pete Sampras	68.75	33–15
Marat Safin	68.29	28–13
minimum 20 wins

Tiebreakers	%	W–L
Roger Federer	65.41	469–248
**Novak Djokovic**	65.09	358–192
Andrés Gómez	63.19	182–106
Pete Sampras	62.84	328–194
Andy Roddick	62.09	303–185
John McEnroe	61.76	189–117
**Alexander Zverev**	61.10	256–163
Rafael Nadal	60.64	265–172
/ Ivan Lendl	60.40	241–158
Milos Raonic	60.25	238–157
minimum 160 wins

=== Single season records ===
#	Titles	Year	Ref
23	Anthony Wilding	1906	
22	Jaroslav Drobný	1952	
22	Rod Laver	1962	
19	Anthony Wilding (2)	1907	
19	Roy Emerson	1964	
18	Bill Tilden	1930	
18	Tony Trabert	1955	
18	Rod Laver (2)	1967	
16	Rod Laver (3)	1966	
16	Guillermo Vilas	1977	

#	Match wins	Year	Ref
147	Rod Laver	1961	
134	Rod Laver (2)	1962	
130	Guillermo Vilas	1977	
128	Pancho Gonzales	1956	
126	Roy Emerson	1961	
126	Tony Roche	1966	
123	Roy Emerson (2)	1964	
123	Tony Roche (2)	1967	
120	Bill Tilden	1925	
119	John Newcombe	1967	

Match winning %	Year	%	W–L	Ref
Bill Tilden	1924	100	68–0	
Bill Tilden (2)	1925	98.73	78–1	
Bill Tilden (3)	1923	98.33	60–1	
Anthony Wilding	1913	98.00	50–1	
Henri Cochet	1928	97.53	81–2	
Bill Tilden (4)	1920	96.61	59–2	
John McEnroe	1984	96.47	82–3	
Anthony Wilding (2)	1914	96.15	50–2	
Jack Kramer	1946	96.15	50–2	
Jimmy Connors	1974	95.88	93–4	
minimum 50 wins

=== Career season streaks ===
#	Career 10+ titles seasons	Years
7	Rod Laver	1964–70
6	Jaroslav Drobný	1950–54, 57.
5	Bill Tilden	1924–27, 30
4	Anthony Wilding	1906–08, 10
4	Jimmy Connors	1973–74, 76, 78
4	Ivan Lendl	1981–82, 85, 89
3	Ken Rosewall	1956, 62, 64
3	John McEnroe	1979, 81, 84
3	Roger Federer	2004–06
2	Ilie Năstase	1972–73
2	Björn Borg	1977, 79
2	Rafael Nadal	2005, 13
2	**Novak Djokovic**	2011, 15

Yrs	Consecutive 10+ titles per season	Streak
7	Rod Laver	1964–70
5	Jaroslav Drobný	1950–54.
4	Bill Tilden	1924–27
3	Anthony Wilding	1906–08
3	Roger Federer	2004–06
2	Ilie Năstase	1972–73
2	Jimmy Connors	1973–74
2	Ivan Lendl	1981–82

Yrs	Consecutive 1+ titles per season	Streak
21	Ken Rosewall	1953–73
21	Rod Laver	1956–76
21	**Novak Djokovic**	2006–26
19	Rafael Nadal	2004–22
18	/ Jaroslav Drobný	1945–63
15	Roger Federer	2001–15
14	Bill Tilden	1918–31
14	Pancho Gonzales	1948–61
14	Ivan Lendl	1980–93
14	Anthony Wilding	1901–14
13	Jimmy Connors	1972–84

=== Single tournament records ===
==== Most titles at a single tournament ====
The following are tennis players who have won a particular tournament at least six times. Note: Grand Slam and Pro Slam tournaments in boldface

#	Player	Tournament	First–last
17	Herbert Roper Barrett	Suffolk Championships	1898–1921
16	Dan Maskell	British Pro Championships	1928–1950
14	Rafael Nadal	**French Open**	2005–2022
13	Herbert Roper Barrett	Essex Championships	1897–1912
13	Mohammed Sleem	Punjab Lawn Tennis Championships	1915,17, 1919–26, 1928–29,31
12	Jean Borotra	Coupe Albert Canet	1921–1938
12	Jean Borotra	French Covered Court Championships	1922–1947
12	Alexander Metreveli	USSR Championships	1966–1967, 1969–1976, 1978, 1980
12	Rafael Nadal	Barcelona Open	2005–2021
11	William Larned	Longwood Challenge Bowl	1894–1897, 1901, 1903–1909.
11	Horace Rice	Sydney Metropolitan Championships	1898–1922
11	Jean Borotra	British Covered Court Championships	1926–1949
11	Stanley Knight	River Plate Championships	1900–1908, 1910–1911.
11	Eric Sturgess	South African Championships	1939–1957
11	Rafael Nadal	Monte-Carlo Masters	2005–2018
10	Wilberforce Eaves	Dinard International	1894–1896, 1902–1909
10	Sydney Howard Smith	Welsh Championships	1896–1906
10	Bill Johnston	Pacific Coast Championships	1913–1927
10	Béla von Kehrling	Hungarian International Championships	1921–1929, 1931–1932
10	Roger Federer	Halle Open	2003–2019
10	Roger Federer	Swiss Indoors	2006–2019
10	Rafael Nadal	Italian Open	2005–2021
10	**Novak Djokovic**	**Australian Open**	2008–2023
9	Sydney Howard Smith	Midland Counties Championships	1896–1898, 1900–1905
9	George Caridia	Welsh Covered Court Championships	1899–1909
8	Laurence Doherty	South of France Championships	1898–1906
8	James Cecil Parke	Irish Championships	1904–1913
8	Max Decugis	French Championships	1903–1914
8	Gerald Patterson	Victorian Championships	1919–1927
8	Harry Hopman	M.C.C. Autumn Championship	1931–33, 1935–38, 1940.
8	Gardnar Mulloy	Austin Smith Championships	1949–1954, 1958, 1961–1962
8	Pancho Gonzales	**U.S. Pro Tennis Championships**	1953–1961
8	Ramanathan Krishnan	National Lawn Tennis Championships of India	1953, 1968–1960, 1962–1964
8	Ken Rosewall	**French Pro Championship**	1958–1966
8	Guillermo Vilas	Buenos Aires	1973–1982
8	Roger Federer	**Wimbledon**	2003–2017
8	Roger Federer	Dubai Tennis Championships	2003–2019
7	Richard Sears	**US Championships**	1881–1887
7	William Renshaw	**Wimbledon**	1881–1889
7	Ernest Lewis	British Covered Court Championships	1887–1896
7	Sydney Howard Smith	Northern Lawn Tennis Championships	1899–1905
7	William Larned	**US Championships**	1901–1911
7	Otto Froitzheim	International German Open	1907–1925
7	Otto Froitzheim	The Homburg Cup	1907–1909, 1911, 1913, 1919–1920
7	Algernon Kingscote	Kent Championships	1914–1926
7	Bill Tilden	U.S. Clay Court Championships	1918–1927
7	Bill Tilden	**US Championships**	1920–1929
7	Karel Kozeluh	Bristol Cup	1925–1932
7	Jack Crawford	Championship of New South Wales	1927–1936
7	Jack Crawford	Victorian Championships	1928–1941
7	John Bromwich	Championship of New South Wales	1937–1949
7	George Worthington	British Pro Championships	1957–1964
7	Pete Sampras	**Wimbledon**	1993–2000
7	Roger Federer	Cincinnati Masters	2005–2015
7	Novak Djokovic	**Wimbledon**	2011–2022
7	Novak Djokovic	Paris Masters	2009–2023
7	Novak Djokovic	ATP Finals	2008–2023
7	Novak Djokovic	China Open	2009–2026
6	Reginald Doherty	Monte Carlo Cup	1897–1904
6	Laurence Doherty	British Covered Court Championships	1901–1906
6	Gottfried von Cramm	International German Open	1932–1949
6	Budge Patty	Paris International Championships	1947, 1952–53, 1955–56, 1958
6	Roy Emerson	**Australian Championships**	1961–1967
6	Ramanathan Krishnan	All India Championships	1954–1965
6	Bobby Wilson	Palace Hotel Covered Courts Championships	1957–1967
6	Ken Rosewall	**Wembley Championships**	1957–1968
6	Rod Laver	**Wembley Championships**	1964–1970
6	Jimmy Connors	ATP Birmingham	1974–1980
6	Björn Borg	**French Open**	1974–1981
6	Balázs Taróczy	Dutch Open	1976–1982
6	Ivan Lendl	Canadian Open	1980–1989
6	Andre Agassi	Miami Open	1990–2003
6	Roger Federer	ATP Finals	2003–2011
6	Novak Djokovic	Miami Open	2007–2016
6	Roger Federer	**Australian Open**	2004–2018
6	John Isner	Atlanta	2013–2021
6	Novak Djokovic	Italian Open	2008–2022

==== Most finals at a single tournament ====
The following are tennis players who have reached the final of single tournament at least eleven times.

- Grand Slam and Pro Slam tournaments in **boldface**

#	Player	Tournament	First–last
18	Herbert Roper Barrett	Suffolk Championships.	1898–1921
17	Dan Maskell	British Pro Championships.	1928–1950
15	Herbert Roper Barrett	North London Championships	1895–1910
15	Horace Rice	Sydney Metropolitan Championships	1895–1922
15	Roger Federer	Swiss Indoors	2000–2019
14	Robert George Bowen	South Australian Championships	1894–1910
14	Nathaniel Niles	Massachusetts Championships	1907–1924
14	Alexander Metreveli	USSR Championships	1963, 1966–1976, 1978, 1980
14	Rafael Nadal	**French Open**	2005–2022
13	William Larned	Longwood Challenge Bowl	1894–1910
13	Herbert Roper Barrett	Essex Championships	1897–1912
13	Jean Borotra	Coupe Albert Canet	1921–1938
13	Jean Borotra	British Covered Court Championships	1926–1949
13	Roger Federer	Halle Open	2003–2019
12	Harold Mahony	Middlesex Championships	1898–1922
12	George Caridia	Welsh Covered Court Championships	1899–1920
12	Max Decugis	French National Championships	1902–1923
12	Jean Borotra	French Covered Court Championships	1922–1947
12	Eric Sturgess	South African Championships	1939–1957
12	Bill Moss	British Pro Championships	1950–1965
12	Rafael Nadal	Monte-Carlo Masters	2005–2018
12	Roger Federer	**Wimbledon**	2003–2019
12	Rafael Nadal	Barcelona Open	2005–2021
12	Rafael Nadal	Italian Open	2005–2021
12	Novak Djokovic	Italian Open	2008–2022
11	Roy Allen	Sheffield and Hallamshire Championships	1894–1909
11	Wallace F. Johnson	Pennsylvania Lawn Tennis Championships	1909–1923
11	John Hawkes	Geelong Easter Championships	1915–1931
11	Jack Crawford	Victorian Championships	1926–1941
11	Harry Hopman	MCC Championships	1931–1949
11	Pancho Gonzales	**U.S. Pro Championships**	1951–1964
11	**Novak Djokovic**	**Australian Open**	2008–2026

==== Most consecutive titles at a single tournament ====
The following are tennis players who have won a particular tournament at least five times in a row.

#	Player	Tournament	Years
14	Herbert Roper Barrett	Suffolk Championships	1904–1921
9	Stanley Knight	River Plate Championships	1900–1908.
9	Dan Maskell	British Pro Championships	1928–1936
8	William Larned	Longwood Bowl	1903–1910
8	Béla von Kehrling	Hungarian International Championships	1921–1929
8	Alexander Metreveli	USSR Championships	1969–1976
8	Rafael Nadal	Monte-Carlo Masters	2005–2012
7	Richard Sears	**US Championships**	1881–1887
7	Sydney Howard Smith	Welsh Championships	1896–1902
7	Sydney Howard Smith	Northern Lawn Tennis Championships	1899–1905
7	Laurence Doherty	South of France Championships	1900–1906
7	Eric Sturgess	South African Championships	1948–1954
7	Pancho Gonzales	**U.S. Pro Tennis Championships**	1953–1959
7	Ken Rosewall	**French Pro Championship**	1960–1966
6	William Renshaw	**Wimbledon**	1881–1886
6	Laurence Doherty	British Covered Court Championships	1901–1906
6	Herbert Roper Barrett	Essex Championships	1901–1906
6	James Cecil Parke	Irish Championships	1908–1913
6	Gerald Patterson	Victorian Championships	1919–1924
6	Bill Tilden	**US Championships**	1920–1925
6	Bill Tilden	U.S. Clay Court Championships	1922–1927
6	Jean Borotra	British Covered Court Championships	1926–1931
6	George Worthington	British Pro Championships	1957–1962
6	Guillermo Vilas	Buenos Aires	1973–1977 (*)
5	Ernest Lewis	British Covered Court Championships	1887–1891
5	Laurence Doherty	**Wimbledon**	1902–1906
5	William Larned	**US Championships**	1907–1911
5	Algernon Kingscote	Kent Championships	1914–1922 (**)
5	Jack Crawford	Victorian Championships	1928–1932
5	Karel Koželuh	Bristol Cup	1928–1932
5	Jean Borotra	French Covered Court Championships	1929–1933
5	Fred Perry	British Hard Court Championships	1932–1936
5	Roy Emerson	**Australian Championships**	1963–1967
5	Björn Borg	**Wimbledon**	1976–1980
5	Balázs Taróczy	Dutch Open	1978–1982
5	Yevgeny Kafelnikov	Kremlin Cup	1997–2001
5	Roger Federer	**Wimbledon**	2003–2007
5	Roger Federer	**US Open**	2004–2008
5	Rafael Nadal	Barcelona Open	2005–2009
5	Rafael Nadal	**French Open**	2010–2014

(*) Tournament held twice in 1977.
(**) Tournament wasn't held during World War I.

== Year-end championships ==
(1970–present) See the Open Era records page since they have occurred entirely in that era.

== Masters tournaments ==
(1970–present) See the Open Era records page since they have occurred entirely in that era.

== Big Titles ==
(1990–present) The Grand Slam tournaments, the Masters events and the ATP Finals are the Big Titles of the annual ATP Tour calendar, in addition to the Olympics.

== Rankings ==
=== Youngest & oldest No. 1 ===
- Age is measured at last day of week (Sunday) ranked as No. 1.

Youngest	19 years, 1 month	Lew Hoad	1953
Oldest	40 years, 10 months	Bill Tilden	1933

== Olympic tournaments ==
(1896–1924, 1988–present) See the Olympic medalists page for the all-time men's medals leaders.

== Prize money ==
(1926–present) Professional tennis started in 1926 but all the top earners have played in the Open Era. See the Open Era records page for the top 10 list.

== See also ==
- Open Era tennis records – Men's singles
- ATP Tour records
- All-time tennis records – Women's singles
- Lists of tennis records and statistics
