= William Moss =

William Moss or Bill Moss may refer to:

- William Moss (Australian politician) (1891–1971)
- W. Stanley Moss or Ivan William Stanley Moss (1921–1965), British WWII army officer, writer and broadcaster
- Bill Moss (musician) (1930–2007), American gospel music singer
- Bill Moss (racing driver) (1933–2010), British former racing driver
- Bill Moss Jr. (born 1971), American gospel singer-songwriter, composer, arranger and producer
- Bill Moss (tennis) (fl. 1940s), British tennis player and four-time winner of the British Pro Championships
- Will Moss (mountain climber), climber of The Nose (El Capitan)
- William Moss (actor), actor in Let's Go Steady
