= 1909 in tennis =

This page covers all the important events in the sport of tennis in 1909. It provides the results of notable tournaments throughout the year on both the men's and women's ILTF tennis circuits.

== Australian Open ==
Category	Champion(s)	Finalist(s)	Score
Singles	(New Zealand) Anthony Wilding	(Australia) Ernie Parker	6–1, 7–5, 6–2
Doubles	(Australia) J. P. Keane (Australia) Ernie Parker	(Australia) Tom Crooks (New Zealand) Anthony Wilding	1–6, 6–1, 6–1, 9–7

== French Open ==
Not a Grand Slam event.

== Wimbledon ==
Category	Champion(s)	Finalist(s)	Score
Men's singles	(United Kingdom of Great Britain and Ireland) Arthur Gore	(United Kingdom of Great Britain and Ireland) Major Ritchie	6–8, 1–6, 6–2, 6–2, 6–2
Women's singles	(United Kingdom of Great Britain and Ireland) Dora Boothby	(United Kingdom of Great Britain and Ireland) Agnes Morton	6–4, 4–6, 8–6
Men's doubles	(United Kingdom of Great Britain and Ireland) Herbert Roper Barrett (United Kingdom of Great Britain and Ireland) Arthur Gore	(Australia) Stanley Doust (New Zealand) Harry Parker	6–2, 6–1, 6–4

== US Open ==
Category	Champion(s)	Finalist(s)	Score
Men's singles	(United States) William Larned	(United States) William Clothier	6–1, 6–2, 5–7, 1–6, 6–1
Women's singles	(United States) Hazel Hotchkiss	(United States) Maud Barger-Wallach	6–0, 6–1
Men's doubles	(United States) Fred Alexander (United States) Harold Hackett	(United States) Maurice McLoughlin (United States) George Janes	6–4, 6–4, 6–0
Women's doubles	(United States) Hazel Hotchkiss (United States) Edith Rotch	(United States) Dorothy Green (Canada) Lois Moyes	6–1, 6–1
Mixed doubles	(United States) Hazel Hotchkiss (United States) Wallace F. Johnson	(United States) Louise Hammond Raymond (United States) Raymond Little	6–2, 6–0
