= Geoff Thomas (tennis) =

Australian tennis player

- Country (sports): Australia

Singles

Grand Slam singles results
- Australian Open: SF (1913)

Doubles

Grand Slam doubles results
- Australian Open: SF (1910)

Geoff Thomas was an Australian tennis player who found success in the early 1900s.

He reached the semifinals of the 1913 Australasian Championships, losing to Ernie Parker in straight sets. In doubles, Thomas reached the semi-finals of the 1910 Australasian Championships (partnering V. Rudder), where they lost to Rice and Campbell.
