= 1913 Australasian Championships – Singles =

Singles
- 1913 Australasian Championships

Final
- Champion: (Australia) Ernie Parker
- Runner-up: (New Zealand) Harry Parker
- Score: 2–6, 6–1, 6–3, 6–2

Details
- Draw: 20

Events
Singles	Doubles
- Australasian Championships

Ernie Parker defeated Harry Parker 2–6, 6–1, 6–3, 6–2 in the final to win the men's singles tennis title at the 1913 Australasian Championships.

== Draw ==
=== Key ===
- Q = Qualifier
- WC = Wild card
- LL = Lucky loser
- r = Retired

Quarterfinals
(Australia) Ernie Parker	6	6	6
(Australia) E. Stokes	4	3	2
(Australia) Geoff Thomas	3	6	6	6
(Australia) J. Kent	6	3	4	0
(New Zealand) Harry Parker	2	6	6	6
(Australia) Alfred Hedeman	6	3	1	3
(Australia) A. Roy Taylor	6	6	6
(Australia) A. Leschen	4	1	1

Semifinals
(Australia) Ernie Parker	6	6	6
(Australia) Geoff Thomas	2	2	3
(New Zealand) Harry Parker	6	4	2	6	6
(Australia) A. Roy Taylor	2	6	6	0	1

Finals
(Australia) Ernie Parker	2	6	6	6
(New Zealand) Harry Parker	6	1	3	2

=== Top half ===
First round
(Australia) J. Kent	w/o
(Australia) W. Teague
(Australia) T. Braham	6	1	6	6
(Australia) L. Taylor	3	6	3	4

Second round
(Australia) E. F. Parker	6	6	6
(Australia) Dyer	0	2	0
(Australia) E. Stokes	5	6	6	7
(Australia) H. Glyde	7	1	1	5
(Australia) G. Thomas	6	2	7	6	6
(Australia) Parsons	4	6	5	8	3
(Australia) J. Kent	6	0	6	6
(Australia) T. Braham	4	6	3	3

Quarterfinals
(Australia) E. F. Parker	6	6	6
(Australia) E. Stokes	4	3	2
(Australia) G. Thomas	3	6	6	6
(Australia) J. Kent	6	3	4	0

Semifinals
(Australia) E. F. Parker	6	6	6
(Australia) G. Thomas	2	2	3

=== Bottom half ===
First round
(New Zealand) H. A. Parker	6	6	6
(Australia) V. Murrell	0	1	1
(Australia) Fry	w/o
(Australia) Murray

Second round
(New Zealand) H. A. Parker	w/o
(Australia) Fry
(Australia) A. Hedeman	6	6	2	6
(Australia) R. Kelsey	4	2	6	3
(Australia) A. R. Taylor	6	8	6
(Australia) Mullen	3	6	0
(Australia) A. Leschen	w/o
(Australia) W. Kither

Quarterfinals
(New Zealand) H. A. Parker	2	6	6	6
(Australia) A. Hedeman	6	3	1	3
(Australia) A. R. Taylor	6	6	6
(Australia) A. Leschen	4	1	1

Semifinals
(New Zealand) H. A. Parker	6	4	2	6	6
(Australia) A. R. Taylor	2	6	6	0	1

Preceded by 1913 U.S. National Championships – Men's singles	Grand Slam men's singles	Succeeded by 1914 Wimbledon Championships – Men's singles
