= 1913 Australasian Championships =

- Date: 11–15 November 1913
- Edition: 9th
- Category: Grand Slam (ITF)
- Surface: Grass
- Location: Perth, Western Australia, Australia
- Venue: Kitchener Park

Champions

Singles
- (Australia) Ernie Parker

Doubles
- (Australia) Alf Hedeman / (Australia) Ernie Parker
- Australasian Championships

The 1913 Australasian Championships was a tennis tournament that took place on outdoor Grass courts at the Kitchener Park, Perth, Australia from 11 November to 15 November. It was the 9th edition of the Australian Championships (now known as the Australian Open), the 2nd held in Perth, and the third Grand Slam tournament of the year. The singles titles was won by Australian Ernie Parker.

== Finals ==
=== Singles ===
(Australia) Ernie Parker defeated (New Zealand) Harry Parker 2–6, 6–1, 6–3, 6–2

=== Doubles ===
(Australia) Alf Hedeman / (Australia) Ernie Parker defeated (New Zealand) Harry Parker / (Australia) Roy Taylor 8–6, 4–6, 6–4, 6–4

Preceded by 1913 U.S. National Championships	Grand Slams	Succeeded by 1914 Wimbledon Championships
