= Bill Moss Jr. =

- Birth name: Bill Moss Jr.
- Born: 1968 (age 56–57)
- Origin: Detroit, Michigan, U.S.
- Genres: Gospel
- Occupation(s): Singer, songwriter, arranger record producer, music director
- Years active: 1993–present
- Labels: Salathiel Records

Bill Moss Jr. (born 1968) is an American gospel singer-songwriter, composer, arranger, and record producer.

== Early life and education ==
Bill Moss Jr. born and raised in Detroit, Michigan, the son of Gospel star Bill Moss Sr. of the popular group, Bill Moss and the Celestials and his cousin's are The Clark Sisters. Bill Moss Jr. began playing the piano at age five. The world first took notice of his talent during a live performance of his parents, Bill Moss and the Celestials. The late Bill Moss Sr. got up from the piano to entertain the audience, and noticed a resounding noise coming from the crowd. To his surprise, just barely able to reach the keys, Bill Jr. was standing up playing the piano,. It stunned the audience and reassured both his parents that the generational blessing that was on the Moss family had manifested itself once again. As an early teen, Moss Jr.'s father paired him with his brother J. Moss as a singing duo, called The Moss Brothers, which continued for the next seven years. The Moss Brothers recorded two major label albums and played locally and regionally on weekends, until Bill Jr. left for college with J Moss soon to graduate high school.

Moss obtained a Bachelor of Arts degree in Music from Marygrove College in Detroit, Michigan. Honing his talents under the tutelage of his aunt, the late Dr. Mattie Moss Clark, he expanded his gifts on the local and national levels. Bill served as National Chief Musician in the Church of God in Christ for five years.

== Career ==
=== Beginnings ===
Moss's music career expanded, recording professionally for top artists such as Hezekiah Walker, Kelly Price, Karen Clark-Sheard, and more recently Byron Cage and J Moss (his brother). As a music director, Moss has collaborated with Walter Hawkins, J Moss, Byron Cage, The Evereadys, Dorothy Norwood, Timothy Wright and T.J. Hemphill. He toured internationally with his cousin Dorinda Clark-Cole and with his parents Bill Sr. and Essie Moss. In 2005, he co-produced the CD, Christmas Joys, recorded by the Christian Tabernacle Church's Voices of Tabernacle Choir. In 2007, Moss produced, wrote and directed Anita Myles hit project "Are You Willing", which was nominated for the Independent Gospel Album of the Year. Moss started his own business, the Moss Academy of Music, that offers private music lessons. The last six albums Moss has worked on have received three Grammy nominations, 19 Stellar nominations, one American Music Award nomination and five Soul Train Music Award nominations.

=== Manifested favor ===
Moss announced that he was finally launching his own production company (BMJ Productions) with a debut album to follow. Manifested Favor was recorded live to a sold out audience at Christian Tabernacle Church on August 11, 2007. Moss released his debut album at Seldom Blues Restaurant on March 24, 2008. Manifested Favor went national on July 1, 2008 and debuted at No. 27 on Gospel Billboard Chart.

== Discography ==
=== Albums ===
- Manifested Favor: Live from Detroit (Salathiel Records, 2008)
- Bill Moss Jr. Live with Third New Hope: Songbook of Praise & Worship (Salathiel Records, 2016)

=== Singles ===
- "The Struggle"
- "Wrestle All Day"
- "Celebrate Our King"

=== Partial productions ===
- 2005 – Christmas Joys – Voices of Tabernacle Choir
- 2007 – Are You Willing – Anita Myles
