= Bill Moss (musician) =

- Born: William Alvin Moss, Sr; May 22, 1931; Selma, Alabama United States
- Died: June 25, 2007 (aged 76)
- Genres: Chrisian
- Occupations: Singer, Songwriter
- Instrument: Piano

Bill Moss (22 May 1931 – 25 June 2007) was an American Gospel music singer.

== Biography ==
Moss was born in 1931 in Selma, Alabama, and sang in a choir led by his older sister the late Dr. Mattie Moss Clark.

He moved to Detroit, Michigan and formed The Celestials with his wife Essie Moss. Bill Moss & the Celestials would perform with acts such as The Staple Singers and Mighty Clouds of Joy at venues such as the Apollo Theater in Harlem. The Celestials were one of the first gospel groups to use electric instruments. Their best known songs include "Turn It Over to Jesus", "Everything is Going to be Alright" and "The Way We Use to Have Church."

== Awards ==
He was inducted into the International Gospel Music Hall of Fame in 2004.

== Musical influence ==
Moss' two sons are currently involved in Gospel music: Bill Moss Jr. and James (performs as J. Moss). His sister, Mattie Moss Clark, and nieces, The Clark Sisters, are also Gospel music singers.
