= 1909 Australasian Championships =

- Date: 16–25 October 1909
- Edition: 5th
- Category: Grand Slam
- Surface: Grass
- Location: Perth, Western Australia, Australia
- Venue: Perth Zoo

Champions

Singles
- (New Zealand) Anthony Wilding

Doubles
- (Australia) J. P. Keane / (Australia) Ernie Parker
- Australasian Championships

The 1909 Australasian Championships was a tennis tournament that took place on outdoor grass courts at Perth Zoo, Perth, Australia from 16 October to 25 October 1909. It was the fifth edition of the Australasian Championships (now known as the Australian Open), the first held in Perth and the third Grand Slam tournament of the year. Anthony Wilding won the singles title, his second after 1906.

== Finals ==
=== Singles ===
(New Zealand) Anthony Wilding defeated (Australia) Ernie Parker 6–1, 7–5, 6–2

=== Doubles ===
(Australia) J. P. Keane / (Australia) Ernie Parker defeated (Australia) Tom Crooks / (New Zealand) Anthony Wilding 1–6, 6–1, 6–1, 9–7

Preceded by 1909 U.S. National Championships	Grand Slams	Succeeded by 1910 Australasian Championships
