= J. P. Keane =

Australian tennis player

JP Keane
- Country (sports): Australia
- Born: 1880s Australia
- Died: c. 1920s Australia

Singles
- Career record: 0
- Career titles: 0

Doubles
- Career record: 1

Grand Slam doubles results
- Australian Open: W (1909)

JP Keane was an Australian amateur tennis player who won the 1909 Australasian Championships in the men's doubles with Ernie Parker, beating Tom Crooks and Anthony Wilding in the final.

== Grand Slam finals ==
=== Doubles (1 title) ===
Result	Year	Championship	Surface	Partner	Opponents	Score
Win	1909	Australian Championships	Grass	(Australia) Ernie Parker	(New Zealand) Tom Crooks (New Zealand) Anthony Wilding	1–6, 6–1, 6–1, 9–7
