= British Pro Championships =

Defunct tennis tournament
- Event name: British Pro Championships
- Tour: Pro tour (1920-1967)
- Founded: 1919
- Abolished: 1967
- Editions: 36
- Location: Roehampton; London; Scarborough; Eastbourne; Great Britain

The British Pro Championships also known as the British Professional Championships and British Professional Lawn Tennis Championships is a defunct men's professional tennis tournament that was played on grass courts from 1920 to 1967. The tournament featured both singles and doubles competitions.

== History ==
The tournament was first staged in Roehampton for two editions from 1919 to 1920, it was not hosted again for a further seven years until 1928 when it was staged in London England on 5 November 1928. The championships were played outdoors on grass courts and alternated between various locations from 1929 until the event ended on 13 August 1967.

== Venues ==
The tournament was staged in different locations for the duration of its run they included:

Host city/town	years staged
Roehampton	1919-1920, 1929
London	1928, 1930–31, 1934–35
Eastbourne	1932-33, 1936–39, 1946–48, 1951–54, 1956–67
Scarborough	1949-50, 1955,

== Men's singles ==
Previous champions included:

Year	Location	Surface	Winner	Runner up	Score
1919	Roehampton	Grass	(United Kingdom) Charles Robert Hierons	(United Kingdom) ?	?
1920	Roehampton	Grass	(United Kingdom) Charles Richard Read	(United Kingdom) Charles Robert Hierons	6-0, 8-6, 6-2
1921–27	Not held				
1928	London	Grass	(United Kingdom) Dan Maskell	(United Kingdom) J. W. Pearce	6-2, 6-4, 3-6, 6-3
1929	Roehampton	Grass	(United Kingdom) Dan Maskell	(United Kingdom) T. C. Jeffery	6-2, 6-4, 6-2
1930	London	Grass	(United Kingdom) Dan Maskell	(United Kingdom) T. C. Jeffery	6-1, 6-0, 6-2
1931	London	Grass	(United Kingdom) Dan Maskell	(United Kingdom) T. C. Jeffery	8-6, 3-6, 6-3, 6-0
1932	Eastbourne	Grass	(United Kingdom) Dan Maskell	(United Kingdom) T. C. Jeffery	6-1, 6-3, 6-3
1933	Eastbourne	Grass	(United Kingdom) Dan Maskell	(United Kingdom) T. C. Jeffery	7-5, 6-4, 6-4
1934	London	Grass	(United Kingdom) Dan Maskell	(United Kingdom) T. C. Jeffery	6-1, 6-3, 6-1
1935	London	Grass	(United Kingdom) Dan Maskell	(United Kingdom) F.H. Poulson	6-3, 3-6, 6-1, 6-4
1936	Eastbourne	Grass	(United Kingdom) Dan Maskell	(United Kingdom) F.H. Poulson	6-0, 6-0, 6-2
1937	Eastbourne	Grass	(United Kingdom) T. C. Jeffery	(United Kingdom) Dan Maskell	6-8, 10-8, 13-11, 6-4
1938	Eastbourne	Grass	(United Kingdom) Dan Maskell	(United Kingdom) T. C. Jeffery	w.o
1939	Eastbourne	Grass	(United Kingdom) Dan Maskell	(United Kingdom) T. C. Jeffery	6-3, 6-4, 6-3
1940–45	Not held due to World War Two				
1946	Eastbourne	Grass	(United Kingdom) Dan Maskell	(United Kingdom) J. W. Pearce	6-2, 7-5, 8-6
1947	Eastbourne	Grass	(United Kingdom) Dan Maskell	(United Kingdom) T. C. Jeffery	8-6, 6-2, 6-2
1948	Eastbourne	Grass	(United Kingdom) Dan Maskell	(United Kingdom) J. W. Pearce	1-6, 6-2, 6-0, 6-3
1949	Scarborough	Grass	(United Kingdom) Dan Maskell	(United Kingdom) Derek Bocquet	7-5, 6-4, 6-2
1950	Scarborough	Grass	(United Kingdom) Dan Maskell	(United Kingdom) Bill Moss	6-4, 6-3, 6-3
1951	Eastbourne	Grass	(United Kingdom) Derek Bocquet	(United Kingdom) Bill Moss	4-6, 6-1, 6-3, 6-0
1952	Eastbourne	Grass	(United Kingdom) Bill Moss	(United Kingdom) Arthur Gordon Roberts	6-3, 6-1, 7-9, 6-3
1953	Eastbourne	Grass	(United Kingdom) Bill Moss	(United Kingdom) Arthur G. Moxham	6-0, 7-5, 6-4
1954	Eastbourne	Grass	(United Kingdom) Arthur Gordon Roberts	(Australia) Donald Tregonning	6-2, 1-6, 6-4 6-3
1955	Scarborough	Grass	(United Kingdom) Arthur Gordon Roberts	(Australia) Donald Tregonning	7-5, 6-3, 6-4
1956	Eastbourne	Grass	(United Kingdom) Bill Moss	(Australia) George Worthington	6-3, 4-6, 6-4, 6-4
1957	Eastbourne	Grass	(Australia) George Worthington	(United Kingdom) Bill Moss	6-4, 6-4, 1-6, 6-1
1958	Eastbourne	Grass	(Australia) George Worthington	(United Kingdom) Bill Moss	6-0, 6-2, 8-6
1959	Eastbourne	Grass	(Australia) George Worthington	(United Kingdom) Bill Moss	6-3, 6-0, 6-4
1960	Eastbourne	Grass	(Australia) George Worthington	(United Kingdom) Bill Moss	6-3, 7-5, 6-0
1961	Eastbourne	Grass	(Australia) George Worthington	(United Kingdom) Bill Moss	6-1, 6-1, 3-6, 6-3
1962	Eastbourne	Grass	(Australia) George Worthington	(United Kingdom) Bill Moss	6-0, 6-1, 6-2
1963	Eastbourne	Grass	(United Kingdom) John Melhuish	(United Kingdom) J.M. Watson	6-3, 6-4, 3-6, 6-3
1964	Eastbourne	Grass	(Australia) George Worthington	(United Kingdom) John Melhuish	6-3, 6-3, 6-4
1965	Eastbourne	Grass	(United Kingdom) Bill Moss	(United Kingdom) Robert Griffin	0-6, 6-2, 6-3, 6-1
1966	Eastbourne	Grass	(United Kingdom) John Horn	(United Kingdom) Robert Griffin	Shared title due to weather
1967	Eastbourne	Grass	(United Kingdom) John Horn	(United Kingdom) Charles R. Applewhaite	3-6, 3-6, 6-3, 9-7, 6-4

== Sources ==
- McCauley, Joe; Trabert, Tony; Collins, Bud (2000). The History of Professional Tennis. The Short Run Book Company Limited. Exeter. England.
