= Ernie Parker =

Australian tennis player and cricketer

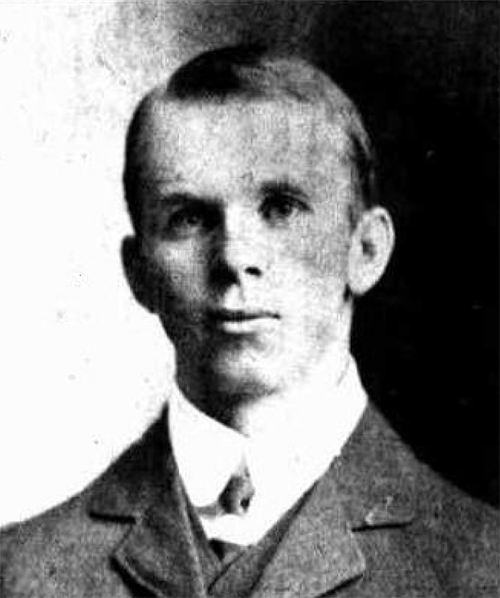
- Full name: Ernest Frederick Parker
- Country (sports): Australia
- Born: 5 November 1883 Perth, Western Australia
- Died: 2 May 1918 (aged 34) Caëstre, France
- Turned pro: 1903 (amateur tour)
- Retired: 1918 (due to death)
- Plays: Right-handed (one-handed backhand)

Singles
- Career record: 46-21 (68.6%)
- Career titles: 8

Grand Slam singles results
- Australian Open: W (1913)

Grand Slam doubles results
- Australian Open: W (1909, 1913)

Ernie Parker
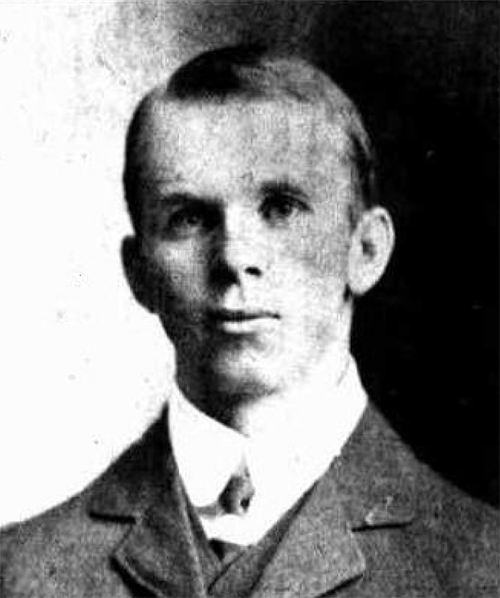

Cricket information
- Batting: Right-handed

Domestic team information
- Years: Team
- 1905/06–1909/10: Western Australia

Career statistics
Competition	First-class
Matches	13
Runs scored	883
Batting average	33.96
100s/50s	2/5
Top score	117
Balls bowled	42
Wickets	0
Bowling average	–
5 wickets in innings	–
10 wickets in match	–
Best bowling	–
Catches/stumpings	9/–
- Source: Cricinfo, 17 December 2019

Ernest Frederick Parker (5 November 1883 – 2 May 1918) was an Australian tennis player and cricketer.

== Career ==
Ernie Parker was born in Perth and educated at Perth High School and St Peter's College, Adelaide, before joining his father's law firm in Perth.

=== Tennis ===
Parker is best remembered for winning the 1913 Australasian Championships men's singles title. The tournament is now known as the Australian Open. In the final against Harry Parker, he made many successful forays to the net and won in four sets. He also reached the final in 1909 and won the 1909 (partnering J. Keane) and 1913 (partnering Alf Hedeman) doubles titles.

He won the Western Australian Championships six times: 1903, 1904, 1907, 1908, 1911 and 1912. In 1905 he won the Maerenbad Cup in Marienbad Brandenberg, Germany, on clay, beating Kurt von Wessely.

Parker's play was described as "quick, wristy, and always looking for a 'winner'". Slightly built, he was noted for his exceptional net play, but his serve was his weakness, described as "merely a means of putting the ball into play".

=== Cricket ===
Parker was able to excel at both tennis and cricket because at the time tennis was mostly a winter game in Perth. He played cricket for East Perth (Perth Cricket Club) and Wanderers in the Western Australian Grade Cricket competition. An elegant batsman, he was the first player to score a double-century in senior Perth cricket, and set a long-standing record of 19 centuries in the competition.

He represented Western Australia in first-class cricket between 1905 and 1910 in the years before Western Australia joined the Sheffield Shield competition. He was the first player to score a first-class century for Western Australia, when he made 116 in his second match. He also made 117 in only 82 minutes against Victoria in 1910. He was included in two trial matches to select the Australian team to tour England in 1909, but without success.

=== War service and death ===
Despite failing eyesight, which had affected his later sporting career, Parker enlisted in the Australian army in World War I. A gunner in the 102 Howitzer Battery, 2nd Brigade, he was killed by an enemy shell on 2 May 1918 in Caëstre, France.

A biography, Ernest Parker: Not a Love Story, by Max Bonnell and Andrew Sproul, was published by The Association of Cricket Statisticians and Historians in 2024.

== Grand Slam finals ==
=== Singles 2 (1 title, 1 runner-up) ===
Result	Year	Championship	Surface	Opponent	Score
Loss	1909	Australasian Championships	Grass	(New Zealand) Anthony Wilding	1–6, 5–7, 2–6
Win	1913	Australasian Championships	Grass	(New Zealand) Harry Parker	2–6, 6–1, 6–2, 6–3

=== Doubles: 2 (2 titles) ===
Result	Year	Championship	Surface	Partner	Opponents	Score
Win	1909	Australasian Championships	Grass	(Australia) J. P. Keane	(Australia) Tom Crooks (New Zealand) Anthony Wilding	1–6, 6–1, 6–1, 9–7
Win	1913	Australasian Championships	Grass	(Australia) Alf Hedeman	(New Zealand) Harry Parker (Australia) Roy Taylor	8–6, 4–6, 6–4, 6–4
