= 1909 Australasian Championships – Singles =

Tennis tournament held in 1909

Singles
- 1909 Australasian Championships

Final
- Champion: (New Zealand) Anthony Wilding
- Runner-up: (Australia) Ernie Parker
- Score: 6–1, 7–5, 6–2

Details
- Draw: 11

Events
Singles	Doubles
- Australasian Championships

Anthony Wilding defeated Ernie Parker 6–1, 7–5, 6–2 in the final to win the men's singles tennis title at the 1909 Australasian Championships. It was Wilding's second Australasian singles title after 1906. The event was held on the grass courts of the Zoological Gardens in Perth.

== Draw ==
=== Key ===
- Q = Qualifier
- WC = Wild card
- LL = Lucky loser
- r = Retired

First round
(New Zealand) Anthony Wilding	6	6	6
(Australia) Neale	0	0	1
(Australia) Richard Eagle	w/o
(Australia) Thomas Melrose Coombe
(Australia) Irwine Owen Gaze	6	5	1	6	6
(Australia) Basil Lathrop Murray	4	7	6	4	1

Second round
(New Zealand) Anthony Wilding	6	6	6
(Australia) Richard Eagle	0	1	0
(Australia) Roland Harcus Kelsey	6	6	2
(Australia) Ivan Reynell Gibbs	4	4	1^{r}
(Australia) Ernie Parker	6	6	6
(Australia) Irwine Owen Gaze	1	0	0
(Australia) Gerald Michael O'Dea	3	6	6	6
(Australia) Lindsay Crooks	6	3	4	3

Semifinals
(New Zealand) Anthony Wilding	6	6	6
(Australia) Roland Harcus Kelsey	0	0	1
(Australia) Ernie Parker	6	6	6
(Australia) Gerald Michael O'Dea	1	2	0

Final
(New Zealand) Anthony Wilding	6	7	6
(Australia) Ernie Parker	1	5	2

Preceded by 1909 U.S. National Championships	Grand Slam men's singles	Succeeded by 1910 Wimbledon Championships
