= 1933 in tennis =

This page covers all the important events in the sport of tennis in 1933. It provides the results of notable tournaments throughout the year on both the men's and women's ILTF tennis circuits.

== Australian Open ==
Category	Champion(s)	Finalist(s)	Score
Men's singles	(Australia) Jack Crawford	(United States) Keith Gledhill	2–6, 7–5, 6–3, 6–2
Women's singles	(Australia) Joan Hartigan	(Australia) Coral McInnes Buttsworth	6–4, 6–3
Men's doubles	(United States) Keith Gledhill (United States) Ellsworth Vines	(Australia) Jack Crawford (Australia) Gar Moon	6–4, 10–8, 6–2
Women's doubles	(Australia) Mall Molesworth (Australia) Emily Hood Westacott	(Australia) Joan Hartigan (United States) Marjorie Gladman Van Ryn	6–3, 6–3
Mixed doubles	(Australia) Marjorie Cox Crawford (Australia) Jack Crawford	(United States) Marjorie Gladman Van Ryn (United States) Ellsworth Vines	3–6, 7–5, 13–11

== French Open ==
Category	Champion(s)	Finalist(s)	Score
Men's singles	(Australia) Jack Crawford	(France) Henri Cochet	8–6, 6–1, 6–3
Women's singles	(United Kingdom) Margaret Scriven	(France) Simonne Mathieu	6–2, 4–6, 6–4
Men's doubles	(United Kingdom) Pat Hughes (United Kingdom) Fred Perry	(Australia) Adrian Quist (Australia) Vivian McGrath	6–2, 6–4, 2–6, 7–5
Women's doubles	(France) Simonne Mathieu (United States) Elizabeth Ryan	(France) Sylvie Jung Henrotin (France) Colette Rosambert	6–1, 6–3
Mixed doubles	(United Kingdom) Margaret Scriven (Australia) Jack Crawford	(United Kingdom) Betty Nuthall (United Kingdom) Fred Perry	6–2, 6–3

== Wimbledon ==
Category	Champion(s)	Finalist(s)	Score
Men's singles	(Australia) Jack Crawford	(United States) Ellsworth Vines	4–6, 11–9, 6–2, 2–6, 6–4
Women's singles	(United States) Helen Moody	(United Kingdom) Dorothy Round	6–4, 6–8, 6–3
Men's doubles	(France) Jean Borotra (France) Jacques Brugnon	(Japan) Ryosuke Nunoi (Japan) Jiro Sato	4–6, 6–3, 6–3, 7–5
Women's doubles	(France) Simonne Mathieu (United States) Elizabeth Ryan	(United Kingdom) Freda James (United Kingdom) Billie Yorke	6–2, 9–11, 6–4
Mixed doubles	(Germany) Gottfried von Cramm (Germany) Hilde Krahwinkel	(South Africa) Norman Farquharson (United Kingdom) Mary Heeley	7–5, 8–6

== US Open ==
Category	Champion(s)	Finalist(s)	Score
Men's singles	(United Kingdom) Fred Perry	(Australia) Jack Crawford	6–3, 11–13, 4–6, 6–0, 6–1
Women's singles	(United States) Helen Jacobs	(United States) Helen Wills Moody	8–6, 3–6, 3–0, ret.
Men's doubles	(United States) George Lott (United States) Lester Stoefen	(United States) Frank Shields (United States) Frank Parker	11–13, 9–7, 9–7, 6–3
Women's doubles	(United Kingdom) Betty Nuthall (United Kingdom) Freda James	(United States) Helen Wills Moody (United States) Elizabeth Ryan	default
Mixed doubles	(United States) Elizabeth Ryan (United States) Ellsworth Vines	(United States) Sarah Palfrey (United States) George Lott	11–9, 6–1
