= 1933 in sports =

1933 in sports describes the year's events in world sport.

== Events calendar ==
Date	Sport	Venue/Event	Status	Winner/s
11 January - 30 May	Tennis	(Canada) / (United States) North American Tour	International	1) (United States) Bill Tilden; 2) (Nazi Germany) Hans Nüsslein
21–30 January	Tennis	(Australia) Australian Championships	International	Men's Singles: (Australia) Jack Crawford; Women's Singles: (Australia) Joan Hartigan Bathurst; Men's Doubles: (United States) Keith Gledhill / (United States) Ellsworth Vines; Women's Doubles: (Australia) Mall Molesworth / (Australia) Emily Hood Westacott
23 January	Tennis	(France) New Courts Club Championships	International	(Republic of Ireland) George Lyttleton Rogers
23 January	Tennis	(Nazi Germany) German Covered Court Championships	International	(Nazi Germany) Gottfried von Cramm
23 January	Tennis	New Zealand Championships	International	Women's Singles: (New Zealand) Dulcie Nichols; Women's Doubles: Mrs R. Adams / Mrs H. Dykes; Mixed Doubles: (New Zealand) Marjorie Macfarlane / (New Zealand) Camille Malfroy
31 January - 5 February	Table tennis	(Austria) World Table Tennis Championships	International	Hungary
1 February	Bobsleigh	(Nazi Germany) FIBT World Championships	International	Romania (Alexandru Papana / Dumitru Hubert)
2–5 February	Multi-sport	(Poland) Maccabiah Winter Games	International	Poland
3–6 February	Speed skating	(Norway) World Allround Speed Skating Championships	International	Women: (Austria) Liselotte Landbeck
4–5 February	Speed skating	(Finland) European Speed Skating Championships	Continental	Men: (Norway) Ivar Ballangrud
6–10 February	Alpine skiing	(Austria) FIS Alpine World Ski Championships	International	Austria
8–12 February	Nordic skiing	(Austria) FIS Nordic World Ski Championships	International	Sweden
11–12 February	Figure skating	(Sweden) World Figure Skating Championships	International	Ladies' singles: (Norway) Sonja Henie; Pair skating: (Hungary) Emília Rotter / László Szollás
18–19 February	Figure skating	(Switzerland) World Figure Skating Championships	International	Men's singles: (Austria) Karl Schäfer
18–19 February	Speed skating	(Switzerland) World Allround Speed Skating Championships	International	Men's singles: (Norway) Hans Engnestangen
18-26 February	Ice hockey	(Czechoslovakia) World Ice Hockey Championships	International	United States
18-26 February	Ice hockey	(Czechoslovakia) Ice Hockey European Championships	Continental	Czechoslovakia
19 February	Motor race	(France) II Pau Grand Prix	International	(France) Marcel Lehoux
26 February	Motor race	(Sweden) III Sveriges Vinter Grand Prix	International	(Sweden) Per-Viktor Widengren
20 March	Motor race	(Australia) VI Australian Grand Prix	International	(Australia) Bill Thompson
26 March	Motor race	(France) V Grand Prix de Tunisie	International	(Italy) Tazio Nuvolari
26 March	Motor race	(France) GP automobile de Tunis	International	(France)
23 April	Motor race	V Grand Prix de Monaco	International	(Italy) Achille Varzi
30 April	Motor race	(Italy) IX Circuito di Alessandria (Circuito Pietro Bordino)	International	(Italy) Tazio Nuvolari
7 May	Motor race	(Italy) VII Gran Premio di Tripoli (I Lotteria di Tripoli)	International	(Italy) Achille Varzi
7 May	Motor race	(Finland) II Eläintarhanajot (Djurgårdsloppet)	International	(Finland) Karl Ebb
21 May	Motor race	(Nazi Germany) III Internationales Avusrennen	International	(Italy) Achille Varzi
21 May	Motor race	(France) IX Grand Prix de Picardie	International	(France) Philippe Étancelin
25 May - 5 June	Tennis	(France) French Championships	International	Men's Singles: (Australia) Jack Crawford; Women's Singles: (United Kingdom) Margaret Scriven; Men's Doubles: (United Kingdom) Pat Hughes / (United Kingdom) Fred Perry; Women's Doubles: (France) Simonne Mathieu / (United States) Elizabeth Ryan; Mixed Doubles: (United Kingdom) Margaret Scriven / (Australia) Jack Crawford
28 May	Motor race	(Nazi Germany) VII Eifelrennen	International	(Italy) Tazio Nuvolari
28 May	Motor race	(Italy) XXIV Targa Florio	International	(Italy) Marchese Antonio Brivio
30 May	Motor race	(United States) XXI International 500 Mile Sweepstakes	International	(United States) Louis Meyer
3 June - 9 September	Rugby	Australia rugby union tour of South Africa	International	Australia
4 June	Motor race	(France) II Trophée de Provence	International	(France) Marcel Jacob
4 June	Motor race	(France) II Grand Prix de Nîmes	International	(Italy) Tazio Nuvolari
4 June	Motor race	(Belgium) VIII Grand Prix des Frontières	International	(Belgium) Willy Longueville
11 June	Motor race	(France) XXVII Grand Prix de l’ACF	International	(Italy) Giuseppe Campari
11 June	Motor race	(Poland) III Grand Prix Lwowa (Großer Preis von Lemberg)	International	(Norway) Eugen Bjørnstad
11 June	Motor race	(Italy) Florence Circuit	International	(Italy) Conde Carlo Felice Trossi
25 June	Motor race	(Spain) IV Gran Premio de Penya Rhin (I Copa Barcelona)	International	(Chile) Juan Zanelli
26 June - 8 July	Tennis	(United Kingdom) Wimbledon Championships	International	Men's Singles: (Australia) Jack Crawford; Women's Singles: (United States) Helen Moody; Men's Doubles: (France) Jean Borotra / (France) Jacques Brugnon; Women's Doubles: (France) Simonne Mathieu / (United States) Elizabeth Ryan; Mixed Doubles: (Nazi Germany) Gottfried von Cramm / (Nazi Germany) Hilde Krahwinkel
27 June - 23 July	Cycling	Tour de France	International	(France) Georges Speicher
1 July	Motor race	(United Kingdom) II British Empire Trophy	International	(Poland) Stanislas Czaykowski
2 July	Motor race	(France) VIII Grand Prix de la Marne	International	(France) Philippe Étancelin
9 July	Motor race	(Belgium) IV Grand Prix de Belgique	International	(Italy) Tazio Nuvolari
12 July	Motor race	(United Kingdom) Mannin Beg	International	(United Kingdom) Freddie Dixon
12–13 July	Chess	(United Kingdom) V Chess Olympiad	International	(United States) Isaac Kashdan, Frank Marshall, Reuben Fine, Arthur Dake, Albert Simonson
12–23 July	Chess	(United Kingdom) IV Women's World Chess Championship	International	(Czechoslovakia) Vera Menchik
14 July	Motor race	(United Kingdom) Mannin Moar	International	(United Kingdom) Brian Lewis, Baron Essendon
16 July	Motor race	(France) V Grand Prix de Dieppe	International	(France) Marcel Lehoux
30 July	Motor race	(Italy) VII Coppa Ciano	International	(Italy) Tazio Nuvolari
31 July - 5 August	Archery	(United Kingdom) World Archery Championships	International	Poland
6 August	Motor race	(France) II Grand Prix de Nice	International	(Italy) Tazio Nuvolari
6 August	Motor race	(Sweden) I Sveriges Sommer Grand Prix	International	(Italy) Antonio Brivio
11–15 August	Cycling	(France) UCI Track Cycling World Championships	International	France
13 August	Motor race	(France) IX Grand Prix de la Baule	International	(United Kingdom) William Grover-Williams
14–15 August	Cycling	(France) UCI Road World Championships	International	France / Switzerland
15 August	Motor race	(Italy) IX Coppa Acerbo	International	(Italy) Luigi Fagioli
14–19 August	Tennis	(United States) U.S. National Championships	International	Women's Singles: (United States) Helen Jacobs; Women's Doubles: (United Kingdom) Betty Nuthall / (United Kingdom) Freda James; Mixed Doubles: (United States) Elizabeth Ryan / (United States) Ellsworth Vines
20 August	Motor race	(France) IX Grand Prix du Comminges	International	(Italy) Luigi Fagioli
27 August	Motor race	(France) II Grand Prix de Marseille	International	(Monaco) Louis Chiron
27 August	Motor race	(France) Grand Prix d’Albi	International	(France) Louis Braillard
2 September	Motor race	(United Kingdom) XII RAC Tourist Trophy	International	(Italy) Tazio Nuvolari
2–10 September	Tennis	(United States) U.S. National Championships	International	Men's Singles: (United Kingdom) Fred Perry; Men's Doubles: (United States) George Lott / (United States) Lester Stoefen
10 September	Motor race	(Italy) XI Gran Premio d’Italia	International	(Italy) Luigi Fagioli
10 September	Motor race	(Italy) VI Gran Premio di Monza	International	(France) Marcel Lehoux
16–17 September	Weightlifting	(Nazi Germany) European Weightlifting Championships	International	Germany
17 September	Motor race	(Czechoslovakia) IV Masarykuv Okruh	International	(Monaco) Louis Chiron
17 September	Motor race	(France) II Grand Prix de l'UMF	International	(France) Raymond Sommer
24 September	Motor race	(Spain) VI Gran Premio de España	International	(Monaco) Louis Chiron
1–8 October	Athletics	(Greece) Balkan Games	International	Greece
7 October	Motor race	(United Kingdom) Donington Park Trophy	International	(United Kingdom) Earl Howe
8 October	Motor race	(Brazil) Grande Prêmio da Cidade de Rio de Janeiro	International	(Brazil) Baron Manuel de Teffé

== Unknown date ==
Sport	Venue/Event	Winner/s
Figure skating	(United Kingdom) European Figure Skating Championships	Men's singles: (Austria) Karl Schäfer; Ladies' singles: (Norway) Sonja Henie; Pair skating: (Austria) Idi Papez / Karl Zwack
Golf	(United States) IV Women's Western Open	(United States) June Beebe
Shooting	(Spain) / (Austria) XXIX ISSF World Shooting Championships	Sweden

== Alpine skiing ==
FIS Alpine World Ski Championships 3rd FIS Alpine World Ski Championships are held at Innsbruck, Austria. The events are a downhill, a slalom and a combined race in both the men's and women's categories. The winners are:

- Men's Downhill – Walter Prager (Switzerland)
- Men's Slalom – Anton Seelos (Austria)
- Men's Combined – Anton Seelos (Austria)
- Women's Downhill – Inge Wersin-Lantschner (Austria)
- Women's Slalom – Inge Wersin-Lantschner (Austria)
- Women's Combined – Inge Wersin-Lantschner (Austria)

Events

- Taft Slalom, the first racing trail in North America, is cut on Cannon Mountain in New Hampshire

== American football ==
- NFL Championship: the Chicago Bears won 23–21 over the New York Giants at Wrigley Field
- Rose Bowl (1932 season):
  - The USC Trojans won 35–0 over the Pittsburgh Panthers to share the college football national championship
- College football national championship – Michigan Wolverines
- Cincinnati Reds, Philadelphia Eagles and Pittsburgh Steelers all founded

== Association football ==
Chile

- Chilean Primera Division, officially founded on May 31, and a first officially game held on July 22.

England

- The Football League – Arsenal 58 points, Aston Villa 54, Sheffield Wednesday 51, West Bromwich Albion 49, Newcastle United 49, Huddersfield Town 47
- FA Cup final – Everton 3–0 Manchester City at Empire Stadium, Wembley, London

Germany

- National Championship – Fortuna Düsseldorf 3–0 F.C. Schalke 04 at Köln

Italy

- Serie A won by Juventus

France

- The inaugural season of French professional football is won by Olympique Lillois.

== Australian rules football ==
VFL Premiership

- 30 September – South Melbourne wins the 37th VFL Premiership defeating Richmond 9.17 (71) to 4.5 (29) at Melbourne Cricket Ground (MCG) in the 1933 VFL Grand Final

Brownlow Medal

- The annual Brownlow Medal is awarded to “Chicken” Smallhorn (Fitzroy)

South Australian National Football League

- 14 October – West Torrens win their second SANFL premiership, defeating Norwood 13.10 (88) to 9.11 (65)
- Magarey Medal awarded to Keith Dunn (Sturt)

Western Australian National Football League

- 16 September – George Doig becomes the first player to score 100 goals in a WA(N)FL season, doing this in the season of his league debut. Doig would score 100 goals every season until 1941, after which World War II ended open-age football until 1945.
- 14 October – East Fremantle wins its seventeenth WANFL premiership, defeating Subiaco 10.13 (73) to 7.7 (49)
- Sandover Medal awarded to Sammy Clarke (Claremont-Cottesloe)

== Bandy ==
Sweden

- Championship final – IFK Uppsala beats IF Göta 11-1

== Baseball ==
World Series

- 3–7 October - New York Giants (NL) defeats Washington Senators (AL) to win the 1933 World Series by 4 games to 1

== Basketball ==
- Northwestern University wins the Big Ten Conference Championship in men's College Basketball.
- A first year of professional basketball game in Spain, Copa del Rey de Baloncesto was held on October 15. (as predecessor of Liga ACB)

== Boxing ==
Events

- 29 June – Primo Carnera defeats Jack Sharkey by a sixth-round knockout at Long Island City to win the World Heavyweight Championship

Lineal world champions

- World Heavyweight Championship – Jack Sharkey → Primo Carnera
- World Light Heavyweight Championship – Maxie Rosenbloom
- World Middleweight Championship – vacant
- World Welterweight Championship – Jackie Fields → Young Corbett III → Jimmy McLarnin
- World Lightweight Championship – Tony Canzoneri → Barney Ross
- World Featherweight Championship – vacant
- World Bantamweight Championship – Panama Al Brown
- World Flyweight Championship – vacant

== Cricket ==
Events

- England, employing bodyline tactics, beat Australia 4–1 to regain The Ashes.

England

- County Championship – Yorkshire
- Minor Counties Championship – undecided^{[a]}
- Most runs – Wally Hammond 3323 @ 67.81 (HS 264)
- Most wickets – Tich Freeman 298 @ 15.26 (BB 8–22)
- Wisden Cricketers of the Year – Fred Bakewell, George Headley, Stan Nichols, Leslie Townsend, Cyril Walters
- The West Indies make a second tour of England, and lose the three Test series two games to nil

Australia

- Sheffield Shield – New South Wales
- Most runs – Herbert Sutcliffe 1,318 @ 73.22 (HS 194)
- Most wickets – Bill O‘Reilly 62 @ 19.95 (BB 6–36)

India

- Bombay Quadrangular – not contested

New Zealand

- Plunket Shield – Otago

South Africa

- Currie Cup – not contested

West Indies

- Inter-Colonial Tournament – not contested

== Cycling ==
- Georges Speicher won the 1933 Tour de France
- Alfredo Binda won the 1933 Giro d'Italia (5th win)
- Georges Speicher won the men's road race at the 1933 UCI Road World Championships

== Field hockey ==
- September 1 – foundation of Oranje Zwart, a Dutch club located in Eindhoven

== Figure skating ==
World Figure Skating Championships

- Men's singles – Karl Schäfer
- Ladies’ singles – Sonja Henie
- Pairs – Emília Rotter and László Szollás

== Golf ==
Major tournaments

- British Open – Denny Shute
- U.S. Open – Johnny Goodman
- PGA Championship – Gene Sarazen

Other tournaments

- British Amateur – Michael Scott
- U.S. Amateur – George Dunlap
- Women's Western Open – June Beebe

== Horse racing ==
England

- Champion Hurdle – Insurance (2nd successive win)
- Cheltenham Gold Cup – Golden Miller (2nd successive win)
- Grand National – Kellsboro Jack
- 1,000 Guineas Stakes – Brown Betty
- 2,000 Guineas Stakes – Rodosto
- The Derby – Hyperion
- The Oaks – Chatelaine
- St. Leger Stakes – Hyperion

Australia

- Melbourne Cup – Hall Mark

Canada

- King's Plate – King O'Connor

France

- Prix de l'Arc de Triomphe – Crapom

Ireland

- Irish Grand National – Red Park
- Irish Derby Stakes – Harinero

USA

- Kentucky Derby – Broker's Tip
- Preakness Stakes – Head Play
- Belmont Stakes – Hurryoff

== Ice hockey ==
- 4 April - 13 April – New York Rangers defeat Toronto Maple Leafs 3–1 in a best of five series to win their second Stanley Cup.

== Motorsport ==
- February 22 - Malcolm Campbell sets world land speed record speed of 272.46 mph driving his famous Blue Bird car at Daytona Beach, Florida

== Nordic skiing ==
FIS Nordic World Ski Championships

- 7th FIS Nordic World Ski Championships 1933 are held at Innsbruck, Austria

== Radiosport ==
Events

- First ever ARRL Field Day contest held in July

== Rowing ==
The Boat Race

- 1 April — Cambridge wins the 85th Oxford and Cambridge Boat Race

== Rugby league ==
- 1933–34 Kangaroo tour of Great Britain

England

- Championship – Salford
- Challenge Cup final – at Empire Stadium, Wembley, London
- Lancashire League Championship – Salford
- Yorkshire League Championship – Castleford
- Lancashire County Cup – Warrington
- Yorkshire County Cup – Leeds

Australia

- NSW Premiership – Newtown 18–4 St. George (grand final)
- An exhibition match between Great Britain and Australia at Paris' Stade Pershing in December 1933 inspired the beginnings of rugby league in France.

== Rugby union ==
Home Nations Championship

- 46th Home Nations Championship series is won by Scotland

== Snooker ==
World Championship

- 7th World Snooker Championship is won by Joe Davis who defeats Willie Smith 25–18

== Speed skating ==
Speed Skating World Championships

- Men's All-round Champion – Hans Engnestangen (Norway)

== Tennis ==
Australia

- Australian Men's Singles Championship – Jack Crawford (Australia) defeats Keith Gledhill (USA) 2–6, 7–5, 6–3, 6–2
- Australian Women's Singles Championship – Joan Hartigan Bathurst (Australia) defeats Coral Buttsworth (Australia) 6–4, 6–3

England

- Wimbledon Men's Singles Championship – Jack Crawford (Australia) defeats Ellsworth Vines (USA) 4–6, 11–9, 6–2, 2–6, 6–4
- Wimbledon Women's Singles Championship – Helen Wills Moody (USA) defeats Dorothy Round Little (Great Britain) 6–4, 6–8, 6–3

France

- French Men's Singles Championship – Jack Crawford (Australia) defeats Henri Cochet (France) 8–6, 6–1, 6–3
- French Women's Singles Championship – Margaret Scriven Vivian (Great Britain) defeats Simonne Mathieu (France) 6–2, 4–6, 6–4

USA

- American Men's Singles Championship – Fred Perry (Great Britain) defeats Jack Crawford (Australia) 6–3, 11–13, 4–6, 6–0, 6–1
- American Women's Singles Championship – Helen Jacobs (USA) defeats Helen Wills Moody (USA) 8–6, 3–6, 3–0, retired

Davis Cup

- 1933 International Lawn Tennis Challenge – Great Britain at 3–2 France at Stade Roland Garros (clay) Paris, France

== Awards ==
Associated Press Athlete of the Year

- Associated Press Male Athlete of the Year – Carl Hubbell (baseball)
- Associated Press Female Athlete of the Year – Helen Jacobs (tennis)

== Notes ==
^{a} An error in calculating points caused Yorkshire Second Eleven to meet and defeat Norfolk in the Minor Counties Challenge Match when that honour should have gone to Wiltshire; by the time the error was discovered, it was October and the weather was unsuitable for cricket, so the Championship was ruled “undecided”
