= 1934 in tennis =

This page covers all the important events in the sport of tennis in 1934. It provides the results of notable tournaments throughout the year on both the men's and women's ILTF tennis circuits.

== Australian Open ==
Category	Champion(s)	Finalist(s)	Score
Men's singles	(United Kingdom) Fred Perry	(Australia) Jack Crawford	6–3, 7–5, 6–1
Women's singles	(Australia) Joan Hartigan	(Australia) Mall Molesworth	6–1, 6–4
Men's doubles	(United Kingdom) Pat Hughes (United Kingdom) Fred Perry	(Australia) Adrian Quist (Australia) Don Turnbull	6–8, 6–3, 6–4, 3–6, 6–3
Women's doubles	(Australia) Mall Molesworth (Australia) Emily Hood Westacott	(Australia) Joan Hartigan (Australia) Ula Valkenburg	6–8, 6–4, 6–4
Mixed doubles	(Australia) Joan Hartigan (Australia) Edgar Moon	(Australia) Emily Hood Westacott (Australia) Roy Dunlop	6–3, 6–4

== French Open ==
Category	Champion(s)	Finalist(s)	Score
Men's singles	(Germany) Gottfried von Cramm	(Australia) Jack Crawford	6–4, 7–9, 3–6, 7–5, 6–3
Women's singles	(United Kingdom) Margaret Scriven	(United States) Helen Jacobs	7–5, 4–6, 6–1
Men's doubles	(France) Jean Borotra (France) Jacques Brugnon	(Australia) Jack Crawford (Australia) Vivian McGrath	11–9, 6–3, 2–6, 4–6, 9–7
Women's doubles	(France) Simonne Mathieu (United States) Elizabeth Ryan	(United States) Helen Jacobs (United States) Sarah Palfrey Cooke	3–6, 6–4, 6–2
Mixed doubles	(France) Colette Rosambert (France) Jean Borotra	(United States) Elizabeth Ryan (Australia) Adrian Quist	6–2, 6–4

== Wimbledon ==
Category	Champion(s)	Finalist(s)	Score
Men's singles	(United Kingdom) Fred Perry	(Australia) Jack Crawford	6–3, 6–0, 7–5
Women's singles	(United Kingdom) Dorothy Round	(United States) Helen Jacobs	6–2, 5–7, 6–3
Men's doubles	(United States) George Lott (United States) Lester Stoefen	(France) Jean Borotra (France) Jacques Brugnon	6–2, 6–3, 6–4
Women's doubles	(France) Simonne Mathieu (United States) Elizabeth Ryan	(United States) Dorothy Andrus (France) Sylvie Henrotin	6–3, 6–3
Mixed doubles	(Japan) Ryuki Miki (United Kingdom) Dorothy Round	(United Kingdom) Bunny Austin (United Kingdom) Dorothy Shepherd Barron	3–6, 6–4, 6–0

== US Open ==
Category	Champion(s)	Finalist(s)	Score
Men's singles	(United Kingdom) Fred Perry	(United States) Wilmer Allison	6–4, 6–3, 1–6, 8–6
Women's singles	(United States) Helen Jacobs	(United States) Sarah Palfrey Cooke	6–1, 6–3
Men's doubles	(United States) George Lott (United States) Lester Stoefen	(United States) Wilmer Allison (United States) John Van Ryn	6–4, 9–7, 3–6, 6–4
Women's doubles	(United States) Helen Jacobs (United States) Sarah Palfrey Cooke	(United States) Carolin Babcock (United States) Dorothy Andrus	4–6, 6–3, 6–4
Mixed doubles	(United States) Helen Jacobs (United States) George Lott	(United States) Elizabeth Ryan (United States) Lester Stoefen	4–6, 13–11, 6–2
