= 1933 Australian Championships – Mixed doubles =

Mixed doubles
- 1933 Australian Championships

Final
- Champions: (Australia) Marjorie Crawford (Australia) Jack Crawford
- Runners-up: (United States) Midge Van Ryn (United States) Ellsworth Vines
- Score: 3–6, 7–5, 13–11

Details
- Draw: 20
- Seeds: 6

Events
Singles	men	women		boys	girls
Doubles	men	women	mixed	boys	girls
- Australian Championships

In the fifth consecutive final appearance, Marjorie Crawford and Jack Crawford successfully defended their title for a third consecutive year by defeating Midge Van Ryn and Ellsworth Vines 3–6, 7–5, 13–11, to win the mixed doubles tennis title at the 1933 Australian Championships.

== Seeds ==
1. (Australia) Marjorie Crawford / (Australia) Jack Crawford (champions)
2. (United States) Midge Van Ryn / (United States) Ellsworth Vines (final)
3. (Australia) Nell Hall / (Australia) Harry Hopman (semifinals)
4. (Australia) Joan Hartigan / (Australia) Gar Moon (quarterfinals)
5. (Australia) Dorothy Weston / (Australia) Don Turnbull (quarterfinals)
6. ( (Australia) Kath Woodward / (Australia) Harry Hassett) (Note: Sources give unclear and often contradicting informations.) (quarterfinals)

== Draw ==
Key

- Q = Qualifier
- WC = Wild card
- LL = Lucky loser
- Alt = Alternate
- ITF = ITF entry
- PR = Protected ranking
- SR = Special ranking
- SE = Special exempt
- JE = Junior exempt
- JR = Junior Accelerator Programme entrant
- CO = College Accelerator Programme entrant
- NG = Next Gen Accelerator Program entrant
- w/o = Walkover
- r = Retired
- d = Defaulted

=== Finals ===
Quarterfinals
1	(Australia) Marjorie Crawford (Australia) Jack Crawford	6	4	6
(6)	(Australia) Kath Woodward (Australia) Harry Hassett	3	6	3
4	(Australia) Joan Hartigan (Australia) Gar Moon	6	9	2
(Australia) Birdie Bond (Australia) Dudley Frankenberg	4	11	6
2	(United States) Midge Van Ryn (United States) Ellsworth Vines	6	6
(Australia) Gwen Griffiths (Australia) Len Schwartz	0	1
3	(Australia) Nell Hall (Australia) Harry Hopman	8	9
5	(Australia) Dorothy Weston (Australia) Don Turnbull	6	7

Semifinals
1	(Australia) Marjorie Crawford (Australia) Jack Crawford	6	6
(Australia) Birdie Bond (Australia) Dudley Frankenberg	3	3
2	(United States) Midge Van Ryn (United States) Ellsworth Vines	6	4	6
3	(Australia) Nell Hall (Australia) Harry Hopman	2	6	4

Final
1	(Australia) Marjorie Crawford (Australia) Jack Crawford	3	7	13
2	(United States) Midge Van Ryn (United States) Ellsworth Vines	6	5	11

=== Earlier rounds ===
==== Section 1 ====
First round
(Australia) Birdie Bond (Australia) Dudley Frankenberg	6	6
(Australia) Peter Smith (Australia) T. E. Robinson	1	4
(Australia) Emily Hood Westacott (Australia) Bill Ryan	6	6
(Australia) Gladys Toyne (Australia) Allan Knight	2	3

Second round
1	(Australia) Marjorie Crawford (Australia) Jack Crawford	6	6
(Australia) Ailsa Carcary (Australia) Colin McKenzie	2	1
(6)	(Australia) Kath Woodward (Australia) Harry Hassett	3	6	6
(Australia) Mollie McGrath (Australia) Reg Ewin	6	3	3
4	(Australia) Joan Hartigan (Australia) Gar Moon	6	6
(Australia) Nancy Chitty (Australia) Eric Freak	0	3
(Australia) Birdie Bond (Australia) Dudley Frankenberg	6	6
(Australia) Emily Hood Westacott (Australia) Bill Ryan	3	4

Quarterfinals
1	(Australia) Marjorie Crawford (Australia) Jack Crawford	6	4	6
(6)	(Australia) Kath Woodward (Australia) Harry Hassett	3	6	3
4	(Australia) Joan Hartigan (Australia) Gar Moon	6	9	2
(Australia) Birdie Bond (Australia) Dudley Frankenberg	4	11	6

Semifinals
1	(Australia) Marjorie Crawford (Australia) Jack Crawford	6	6
(Australia) Birdie Bond (Australia) Dudley Frankenberg	3	3

==== Section 2 ====
First round
2	(United States) Midge Van Ryn (United States) Ellsworth Vines	6	6
(Australia) Jean Glover (Australia) Basil Fitchett	1	4
(Australia) Meryl O'Hara Wood (Australia) Bob Schlesinger	6	4	6
(Australia) Gwen Stevenson (Australia) Bert Tonkin	4	6	2

Second round
2	(United States) Midge Van Ryn (United States) Ellsworth Vines	6	6
(Australia) Meryl O'Hara Wood (Australia) Bob Schlesinger	2	2
(Australia) Gwen Griffiths (Australia) Len Schwartz	6	3	6
(Australia) Frances Hoddle-Wrigley (Australia) Horace Crebbin	1	6	1
3	(Australia) Nell Hall (Australia) Harry Hopman	6	6
(Australia) Dorothy Bellamy (Australia) Neil Ennis	1	3
5	(Australia) Dorothy Weston (Australia) Don Turnbull	7	6
(Australia) May Hardcastle (Australia) Jack Cummings	5	4

Quarterfinals
2	(United States) Midge Van Ryn (United States) Ellsworth Vines	6	6
(Australia) Gwen Griffiths (Australia) Len Schwartz	0	1
3	(Australia) Nell Hall (Australia) Harry Hopman	8	9
5	(Australia) Dorothy Weston (Australia) Don Turnbull	6	7

Semifinals
2	(United States) Midge Van Ryn (United States) Ellsworth Vines	6	4	6
3	(Australia) Nell Hall (Australia) Harry Hopman	2	6	4
