= 1934 Australian Championships – Women's doubles =

Women's doubles
- 1934 Australian Championships

Final
- Champions: (Australia) Mall Molesworth (Australia) Emily Hood Westacott
- Runners-up: (Australia) Joan Hartigan (Australia) Ula Valkenburg
- Score: 6–8, 6–4, 6–4

Details
- Draw: 16 (4Q)
- Seeds: 4

Events
Singles	men	women		boys	girls
Doubles	men	women	mixed	boys	girls
- Australian Championships

Defending champions Mall Molesworth and Emily Hood Westacott defeated Joan Hartigan and Ula Valkenburg 6–8, 6–4, 6–4 in the final, to win the women's doubles tennis title at the 1934 Australian Championships.

Twenty three teams have entered for the event in which number of pairs was limited to sixteen. Twelve pairs were placed in the main draw and eleven had to play in the preliminary rounds, from which the last four qualified into the first round of the competition proper.

== Seeds ==
1. (Australia) Mall Molesworth / (Australia) Emily Hood Westacott (champions)
2. (Australia) Louie Bickerton / (Australia) Nell Hall (semifinals)
3. (Australia) Joan Hartigan / (Australia) Ula Valkenburg (final)
4. (Australia) Nancy Chitty / (Australia) Nancy Lewis (semifinals)

== Draw ==
Key

- Q = Qualifier
- WC = Wild card
- LL = Lucky loser
- Alt = Alternate
- ITF = ITF entry
- PR = Protected ranking
- SR = Special ranking
- SE = Special exempt
- JE = Junior exempt
- JR = Junior Accelerator Programme entrant
- CO = College Accelerator Programme entrant
- NG = Next Gen Accelerator Program entrant
- w/o = Walkover
- r = Retired
- d = Defaulted

=== Draw ===
First round
1	(Australia) Mall Molesworth (Australia) Emily Hood Westacott	6	7
Q	(Australia) Mrs F. A. Harper (Australia) Helen McTaggett	2	5
(Australia) Gwen Cassidy (Australia) Muff Wilson	w/o
(Australia) Gwen Utz (Australia) partner
(Australia) Dot Stevenson (Australia) Gwen Stevenson	1	8	7
(Australia) Edna Gardyne (Australia) Kathleen Le Messurier	6	6	5
4	(Australia) Nancy Chitty (Australia) Nancy Lewis	6	7
Q	(Australia) Edna Collison (Australia) Joyce Hone	2	5
3	(Australia) Joan Hartigan (Australia) Ula Valkenburg	6	6
Q	(Australia) Peg Menzies (Australia) P. O'Connor	1	4
(Australia) Dorothy Bellamy (Australia) Sylvia Harper	7	6
(Australia) Floris Conway (Australia) Marjorie Crawford	5	4
(Australia) Alison Hattersley (Australia) Vera Selwin	6	2	6
(Australia) Truda Cox (Australia) May Blick	3	6	3
2	(Australia) Louie Bickerton (Australia) Nell Hall	6	6
Q	(Australia) Thelma Coyne (Australia) Agnes Tosh	4	2

Quarterfinals
1	(Australia) Mall Molesworth (Australia) Emily Hood Westacott	6	6
(Australia) Gwen Cassidy (Australia) Muff Wilson	2	3
(Australia) Dot Stevenson (Australia) Gwen Stevenson	3	5
4	(Australia) Nancy Chitty (Australia) Nancy Lewis	6	7
3	(Australia) Joan Hartigan (Australia) Ula Valkenburg	6	6
(Australia) Dorothy Bellamy (Australia) Sylvia Harper	2	4
(Australia) Alison Hattersley (Australia) Vera Selwin	2	6
2	(Australia) Louie Bickerton (Australia) Nell Hall	6	8

Semifinals
1	(Australia) Mall Molesworth (Australia) Emily Hood Westacott	6	6
4	(Australia) Nancy Chitty (Australia) Nancy Lewis	4	3
3	(Australia) Joan Hartigan (Australia) Ula Valkenburg	6	6
2	(Australia) Louie Bickerton (Australia) Nell Hall	3	1

Final
1	(Australia) Mall Molesworth (Australia) Emily Hood Westacott	6	6	6
3	(Australia) Joan Hartigan (Australia) Ula Valkenburg	8	4	4
