= 1934 Australian Championships =

- Date: 18–27 January 1934
- Edition: 27th
- Category: Grand Slam (ITF)
- Surface: Grass
- Location: Sydney, Australia
- Venue: White City Tennis Club

Champions

Men's singles
- (United Kingdom) Fred Perry

Women's singles
- (Australia) Joan Hartigan

Men's doubles
- (United Kingdom) Pat Hughes / (United Kingdom) Fred Perry

Women's doubles
- (Australia) Mall Molesworth / (Australia) Emily Hood Westacott

Mixed doubles
- (Australia) Joan Hartigan / (Australia) Edgar Moon

Boys' singles
- (Australia) Neil Ennis

Girls' singles
- (Australia) May Blick

Boys' doubles
- (Australia) Neil Ennis / (Australia) Colin McKenzie

Girls' doubles
- (Australia) Ethyl Chrystal / (Australia) Edna McColl
- Australian Championships

The 1934 Australian Championships was a tennis tournament that took place on outdoor Grass courts at the White City Tennis Club, Sydney, Australia from 18 January to 27 January. It was the 27th edition of the Australian Championships (now known as the Australian Open), the 7th held in Sydney, and the first Grand Slam tournament of the year. The singles titles were won by Briton Fred Perry and Australian Joan Hartigan.

== Finals ==
=== Men's singles ===
(United Kingdom) Fred Perry defeated (Australia) Jack Crawford 6–3, 7–5, 6–1

=== Women's singles ===
(Australia) Joan Hartigan defeated (Australia) Mall Molesworth 6–1, 6–4

=== Men's doubles ===
(United Kingdom) Pat Hughes / (United Kingdom) Fred Perry defeated (Australia) Adrian Quist / (Australia) Don Turnbull 6–8, 6–3, 6–4, 3–6, 6–3

=== Women's doubles ===
(Australia) Mall Molesworth / (Australia) Emily Hood Westacott defeated (Australia) Joan Hartigan / (Australia) Ula Valkenburg 6–8, 6–4, 6–4

=== Mixed doubles ===
(Australia) Joan Hartigan / (Australia) Edgar Moon defeated (Australia) Emily Hood Westacott / (Australia) Roy Dunlop 6–3, 6–4

Preceded by 1933 U.S. National Championships	Grand Slams	Succeeded by 1934 French Championships
