= Alexander Patent Racket Company =

Australian sports company

Alexander Patent Racket Company Ltd.
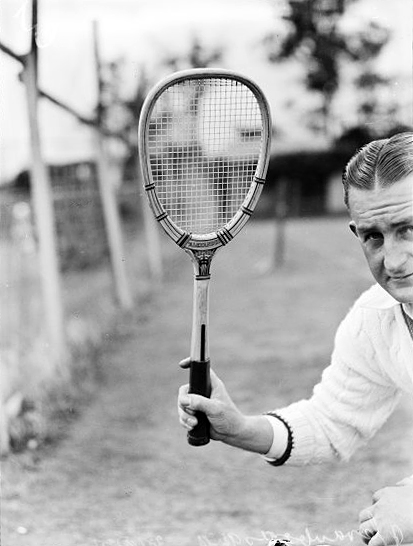
- Jack Crawford in 1933 with an Alexander Cressy Wizard flat top racquet
- Industry: Sports equipment
- Founded: 1925; 101 years ago
- Founders: Alfred Alexander Jr. and Stephen B. Hopwood
- Fate: Liquidated in 1961
- Headquarters: Launceston, Tasmania, Australia

The Alexander Patent Racket Company was an Australian sports equipment manufacturer based in Launceston, Tasmania, which operated between 1925 and 1961.

The company was established by Alfred Alexander Jr. and Stephen B. Hopwood, initially to manufacture tennis racquets. From 1931, the company expanded its range to include the manufacture of badminton and squash racquets, cricket bats, golf clubs, hockey sticks and table tennis bats.

The company is notable for producing the world's first laminated tennis racquet. The patent for this laminated tennis racquet, lodged on 12 July 1921 by brothers Alfred Alexander Jr. and Douglas Davey Alexander, is where the company derived its name.

== History ==
The Memorandum of Association of the Alexander Patent Racket Company incorporated the company on December 22, 1925. The first object of the company's establishment was to purchase the laminated tennis racquet patent rights from Stephen B. Hopwood and Alfred Alexander Jr. The company's manufacturing operations commenced in May 1926. Prior to the company's establishment, racquets made by Alexander were sold exclusively in Hopwood's Launceston store Hopwood & Co.

Because early experiments found that no locally grown timber was suitable for the manufacture of tennis racquets, the company was forced to import ash from England. In an attempt to overcome the financial and logistical difficulties involved in importing such large quantities of ash, the directors of the Alexander Patent Racket Company explored the possibility of growing ash trees locally. To this end, a company by the name of Ash Plantations Ltd was formed in 1933. By the late 1930s, Ash Plantations Ltd had planted over 90,000 ash trees in Hollybank Forest, Underwood, as well as a smaller quantity of willow trees for manufacturing cricket bats. The ash trees failed to thrive due to the nature of the soil at Hollybank and the project was abandoned in 1950.

During World War II, the Alexander Patent Racket Company took up various defence manufacturing contracts, producing goods such as ammunition boxes, crates, drums and latrine poles. The company would continue to bid for government contracts until well after the war, including for the Department of Supply and the Postmaster-General's Department. Around this time, the company briefly produced Tasmanian oak hardwood furniture, a venture which failed because the company was registered as a sporting goods manufacturer and lacked the appropriate license for furniture manufacturing.

By the late 1950s, increasing automation and advancements in manufacturing technology meant that the Alexander Patent Racket Company was no longer able to compete against larger sporting goods suppliers. In April 1958, the company delisted from the Launceston Stock Exchange, which it had been on since May 1936. The company went into liquidation on September 18, 1961, after unsuccessful talks were held with Spalding to buy the company. Spalding did, however, purchase the rights to the Cressy brand, with Spalding Cressy tennis racquets produced from their factory in Victoria until at least 1966.

=== The factory ===
The company's original factory was completed in May 1926 at 146 Abbott Street, Newstead. Major extensions to the factory were carried out in 1927, 1928, 1934 and 1951.

Teams composed of workers from the Alexander factory competed in local cricket and Australian football leagues. There was also a sports club based at the factory which held cycling competitions.

Following the liquidation of the Alexander Patent Racket Company, unsuccessful talks were held with Dunlop Rubber to purchase the factory in 1962. Subsequently, the site was left vacant for several years and fell into disrepair. During this time, the original factory building was removed from the site. The remaining factory building now serves as the clubrooms of the Launceston PCYC, which purchased the site in 1968.

== Sponsorship ==
=== Tennis ===
The most successful tennis player sponsored by the Alexander Patent Racket Company was 1933 World No. 1 Jack Crawford, who was champion of six Grand Slam singles tournaments, six Grand Slam doubles tournaments, and five Grand Slam mixed doubles tournaments. In 1933, Crawford won the Australian Open, French Open and Wimbledon using an Alexander Cressy Wizard flat top racquet. Adrian Quist, who had partnered Crawford to win the 1935 Wimbledon doubles, was another tennis star sponsored by Alexander. In his career, Quist won three Grand Slam singles tournaments and fourteen Grand Slam doubles tournaments. In 1936, the company paid a wage of £450 to Crawford and £250 to Quist.

On two occasions, the Alexander Patent Racket Company produced a range of tennis racquets under the name of a well known tennis player as part of an endorsement deal. From 1929 to 1934, the company produced a J.O. Anderson range of tennis racquets, endorsed by three time Australian Open winner and 1922 Wimbledon Doubles champion James Anderson. From 1933 to 1941, a Jim Willard range of racquets was produced, endorsed by the two time Australian Open mixed doubles champion. Many other high profile Australian tennis players used Alexander racquets, including Don Turnbull, Cliff Sproule, Gar Moon, Jack Cummings, Jack Clemenger, Ian Ayre, Norman Peach, Neale Fraser and Daphne Akhurst.

=== Cricket ===
From 1934 to 1939, the Alexander Patent Racket Company produced a range of Jack Badcock cricket bats, as part of an endorsement deal with the Tasmanian cricketer. A similar endorsement deal with Victorian cricketer Keith Rigg existed from 1933 to 1937. Several Australian test cricketers acted as sales agents for the company, including Stan McCabe and Vic Richardson, who both played with Alexander bats. Alan Kippax, another Australian batsman to make use of the Alexander product, had the company produce a Kippax bat to be sold from his sports store, the N.S.W. Sports Depot.

Alexander cricket bats were commonly used by Tasmanian first-class cricketers, including Ron Morrisby, Edward Smith and Alf Rushforth. Rushforth, who played 24 first-class cricket matches for Tasmania, was employed as general manager of the Alexander Patent Racket Company from 1950 to 1959.
