= 1934 Australian Championships – Mixed doubles =

Mixed doubles
- 1934 Australian Championships

Final
- Champions: (Australia) Joan Hartigan (Australia) Gar Moon
- Runners-up: (Australia) Emily Hood Westacott (Australia) Ray Dunlop
- Score: 6–3, 6–4

Details
- Draw: 19
- Seeds: 4

Events
Singles	men	women		boys	girls
Doubles	men	women	mixed	boys	girls
- Australian Championships

The second seeds Joan Hartigan and Gar Moon defeated Emily Hood Westacott and Ray Dunlop 6–3, 6–4, to win the mixed doubles tennis title at the 1934 Australian Championships.

== Seeds ==
1. (Australia) Nell Hall / (Australia) Harry Hopman (semifinals)
2. (Australia) Joan Hartigan / (Australia) Gar Moon (champions)
3. (Australia) Emily Hood Westacott / (Australia) Ray Dunlop (final)
4. (Australia) Alison Hattersley / (Australia) Aubrey Willard (semifinals)

== Draw ==
Key

- Q = Qualifier
- WC = Wild card
- LL = Lucky loser
- Alt = Alternate
- ITF = ITF entry
- PR = Protected ranking
- SR = Special ranking
- SE = Special exempt
- JE = Junior exempt
- JR = Junior Accelerator Programme entrant
- CO = College Accelerator Programme entrant
- NG = Next Gen Accelerator Program entrant
- w/o = Walkover
- r = Retired
- d = Defaulted

=== Finals ===
Quarterfinals
1	(Australia) Nell Hall (Australia) Harry Hopman	6	6
(Australia) Kathleen Le Messurier (Australia) Don Turnbull	2	3
(Australia) Truda Cox (Australia) Dave Thompson	1	5
3	(Australia) Emily Hood Westacott (Australia) Ray Dunlop	6	7
4	(Australia) Alison Hattersley (Australia) Aubrey Willard	6	6
(Australia) Gwen Cassidy (Australia) Norman Peach	1	2
(Australia) Nancy Lewis (Australia) Reg Ewin	1	6
2	(Australia) Joan Hartigan (Australia) Gar Moon	6	8

Semifinals
1	(Australia) Nell Hall (Australia) Harry Hopman	1	3
3	(Australia) Emily Hood Westacott (Australia) Ray Dunlop	6	6
4	(Australia) Alison Hattersley (Australia) Aubrey Willard	11	6
2	(Australia) Joan Hartigan (Australia) Gar Moon	13	8

Final
3	(Australia) Emily Hood Westacott (Australia) Ray Dunlop	3	4
2	(Australia) Joan Hartigan (Australia) Gar Moon	6	6

=== Earlier rounds ===
==== Section 1 ====
First round
(Australia) Sylvia Harper (Note: Not in the initial draw. (Corbett/Kendall originally received a bye.)) (Australia) Gar Hone	6	6
(Australia) Eileen Corbett (Australia) George Kendall	2	4
(Australia) Truda Cox (Australia) Dave Thompson	6	6
(Australia) Nancy Chitty (Australia) Allan Knight	1	4

Second round
1	(Australia) Nell Hall (Australia) Harry Hopman	6	6
(Australia) Vera Selwin (Australia) R. C. Smith	2	2
(Australia) Kathleen Le Messurier (Australia) Don Turnbull	w/o
(Australia) Gwen Stevenson (New Zealand) Charles Angus
(Australia) Sylvia Harper (Australia) Gar Hone	6	3	2
(Australia) Truda Cox (Australia) Dave Thompson	6	6	6
3	(Australia) Emily Hood Westacott (Note: Originally Dunlop was paired with Ula Valkenburg.) (Australia) Ray Dunlop	6	6
(Australia) Mary Chapman (Australia) Len Schwartz	4	4

Quarterfinals
1	(Australia) Nell Hall (Australia) Harry Hopman	6	6
(Australia) Kathleen Le Messurier (Australia) Don Turnbull	2	3
(Australia) Truda Cox (Australia) Dave Thompson	1	5
3	(Australia) Emily Hood Westacott (Australia) Ray Dunlop	6	7

Semifinals
1	(Australia) Nell Hall (Australia) Harry Hopman	1	3
3	(Australia) Emily Hood Westacott (Australia) Ray Dunlop	6	6

==== Section 2 ====
First round
(Australia) Mall Molesworth (Australia) Hughie Goodwin	6	6
(Australia) Mary Storey (Australia) H. B. Austin	4	2

Second round
4	(Australia) Alison Hattersley (Australia) Aubrey Willard	6	6
(Australia) Edna Gardyne (Australia) Joe Rogers	3	3
(Australia) Mall Molesworth (Australia) Hughie Goodwin	2	3
(Australia) Gwen Cassidy (Note: Initial pairing was Peach with Gwen Utz.) (Australia) Norman Peach	6	6
(Australia) Nancy Lewis (Australia) Reg Ewin	6	8
(Australia) Nina Vickery (Australia) Bruce Moore	4	6
2	(Australia) Joan Hartigan (Australia) Gar Moon	6	6
(Australia) Dorothy Bellamy (Australia) Jack Clemenger	2	2

Quarterfinals
4	(Australia) Alison Hattersley (Australia) Aubrey Willard	6	6
(Australia) Gwen Cassidy (Australia) Norman Peach	1	2
(Australia) Nancy Lewis (Australia) Reg Ewin	1	6
2	(Australia) Joan Hartigan (Australia) Gar Moon	6	8

Semifinals
4	(Australia) Alison Hattersley (Australia) Aubrey Willard	11	6
2	(Australia) Joan Hartigan (Australia) Gar Moon	13	8
