= 1933 Australian Championships – Women's doubles =

Women's doubles
- 1933 Australian Championships

Final
- Champions: (Australia) Mall Molesworth (Australia) Emily Hood Westacott
- Runners-up: (Australia) Joan Hartigan (United States) Midge Van Ryn
- Score: 6–3, 6–3

Details
- Draw: 19
- Seeds: 6

Events
Singles	men	women		boys	girls
Doubles	men	women	mixed	boys	girls
- Australian Championships

Mall Molesworth and Emily Hood Westacott claimed their second domestic title by defeating Joan Hartigan and Midge Van Ryn 6–3, 6–3 (Note: Some sources give 6–3, 6–2 as the result.) in the final, to win the women's doubles tennis title at the 1933 Australian Championships.

== Seeds ==
1. (Australia) Coral Buttsworth / (Australia) Marjorie Crawford (quarterfinals)
2. (Australia) Meryl O'Hara Wood / (Australia) Gladys Toyne (quarterfinals)
3. (Australia) Mall Molesworth / (Australia) Emily Hood Westacott (champions)
4. ( (Australia) Dorothy Bellamy / (Australia) Molly Muirhead) (Note: Originally the fourth seeds were Dorothy Bellamy with Sylvia Harper, but the latter withdrew from the tournament due to leg injury. It's unclear whether Bellamy with a new partner had retained this seed.) (quarterfinals)
5. (Australia) Joan Hartigan / (United States) Midge Van Ryn (final)
6. (Australia) Nell Hall / (Australia) Frances Hoddle-Wrigley (quarterfinals)

== Draw ==
Key

- Q = Qualifier
- WC = Wild card
- LL = Lucky loser
- Alt = Alternate
- ITF = ITF entry
- PR = Protected ranking
- SR = Special ranking
- SE = Special exempt
- JE = Junior exempt
- JR = Junior Accelerator Programme entrant
- CO = College Accelerator Programme entrant
- NG = Next Gen Accelerator Program entrant
- w/o = Walkover
- r = Retired
- d = Defaulted

=== Finals ===
Quarterfinals
2	(Australia) Meryl O'Hara Wood (Australia) Gladys Toyne	4	10	4
(Australia) Mary Derham (Australia) Kath Woodward	6	8	6
3	(Australia) Mall Molesworth (Australia) Emily Hood Westacott	6	6
6	(Australia) Nell Hall (Australia) Frances Hoddle-Wrigley	2	2
1	(Australia) Coral Buttsworth (Australia) Marjorie Crawford	8	4	2
5	(Australia) Joan Hartigan (United States) Midge Van Ryn	6	6	6
(4)	(Australia) Dorothy Bellamy (Australia) Molly Muirhead	3	6	4
(Australia) May Blick (Australia) Truda Cox	6	3	6

Semifinals
(Australia) Mary Derham (Australia) Kath Woodward	0	2
3	(Australia) Mall Molesworth (Australia) Emily Hood Westacott	6	6
5	(Australia) Joan Hartigan (United States) Midge Van Ryn	6	7
(Australia) May Blick (Australia) Truda Cox	2	5

Final
3	(Australia) Mall Molesworth (Australia) Emily Hood Westacott	6	6
5	(Australia) Joan Hartigan (United States) Midge Van Ryn	3	3

=== Earlier rounds ===
==== Section 1 ====
First round
6	(Australia) Nell Hall (Australia) Frances Hoddle-Wrigley	7	8	6
(Australia) Amy Lewis (Australia) Nancy Lewis	9	6	3
(Australia) Youtha Anthony (Australia) Nancy Chitty	7	6
(Australia) Doris Mauger (Australia) Shirley Whittaker	5	4

Second round
2	(Australia) Meryl O'Hara Wood (Australia) Gladys Toyne	6	6
(Australia) Helen Halford (Australia) Mrs. Newton	0	4
(Australia) Mary Derham (Australia) Kath Woodward	6	6
(Australia) Mollie McGrath (Australia) Peter Smith	1	4
3	(Australia) Mall Molesworth (Australia) Emily Hood Westacott	6	6
(Australia) Rosemary Rees (Australia) Mrs. C. F. Barnes	3	3
6	(Australia) Nell Hall (Australia) Frances Hoddle-Wrigley	7	6
(Australia) Youtha Anthony (Australia) Nancy Chitty	5	3

Quarterfinals
2	(Australia) Meryl O'Hara Wood (Australia) Gladys Toyne	4	10	4
(Australia) Mary Derham (Australia) Kath Woodward	6	8	6
3	(Australia) Mall Molesworth (Australia) Emily Hood Westacott	6	6
6	(Australia) Nell Hall (Australia) Frances Hoddle-Wrigley	2	2

Semifinals
(Australia) Mary Derham (Australia) Kath Woodward	0	2
3	(Australia) Mall Molesworth (Australia) Emily Hood Westacott	6	6

==== Section 2 ====
First round
1	(Australia) Coral Buttsworth (Australia) Marjorie Crawford	6	6
(Australia) Dot Stevenson (Australia) Gwen Stevenson	1	4

Second round
1	(Australia) Coral Buttsworth (Australia) Marjorie Crawford	6	6	6
(Australia) Gwen Griffiths (Australia) Dorothy Weston	8	3	2
5	(Australia) Joan Hartigan (United States) Midge Van Ryn	6	6
(Australia) Ailsa Carcary (Australia) Jean Glover	2	4
(4)	(Australia) Dorothy Bellamy (Australia) Molly Muirhead	6	7
(Australia) May Hardcastle (Australia) Joyce Williams	2	5
(Australia) May Blick (Australia) Truda Cox	6	7
(Australia) Birdie Bond (Australia) Kitty McGough	4	5

Quarterfinals
1	(Australia) Coral Buttsworth (Australia) Marjorie Crawford	8	4	2
5	(Australia) Joan Hartigan (United States) Midge Van Ryn	6	6	6
(4)	(Australia) Dorothy Bellamy (Australia) Molly Muirhead	3	6	4
(Australia) May Blick (Australia) Truda Cox	6	3	6

Semifinals
5	(Australia) Joan Hartigan (United States) Midge Van Ryn	6	7
(Australia) May Blick (Australia) Truda Cox	2	5
