= 1933 Australian Championships – Men's doubles =

1933 Australian Championships men's doubles tennis champions

Men's doubles
- 1933 Australian Championships

Final
- Champions: (United States) Keith Gledhill (United States) Ellsworth Vines
- Runners-up: (Australia) Jack Crawford (Australia) Gar Moon
- Score: 6–4, 10–8, 6–2

Details
- Draw: 15
- Seeds: 6 (8) (Note: Sources give unclear and often contradicting informations. The remaining pairs would be Hopman with McGrath and Cummings with Hassett. Purcell with Tonkin would be the eight seeds.)

Events
Singles	men	women		boys	girls
Doubles	men	women	mixed	boys	girls
← 1932 ·	Australian Championships	· 1934 →

Keith Gledhill and Ellsworth Vines defeated the defending champions Jack Crawford and Gar Moon 6–4, 10–8, 6–2 in the final, to win the men's doubles tennis title at the 1933 Australian Championships.

== Seeds ==
1. (United States) Wilmer Allison / (United States) John Van Ryn (semifinals)
2. (United States) Keith Gledhill / (United States) Ellsworth Vines (champions)
3. (Australia) Jack Crawford / (Australia) Gar Moon (final)
4. (Australia) Jack Clemenger / (Australia) Bob Schlesinger (quarterfinals)
5. (Australia) Adrian Quist / (Australia) Don Turnbull (quarterfinals)
6. (Australia) Jack Purcell / (Australia) Bert Tonkin (quarterfinals)

== Draw ==
=== Key ===
- Q = Qualifier
- WC = Wild card
- LL = Lucky loser
- Alt = Alternate
- ITF = ITF entry
- PR = Protected ranking
- SR = Special ranking
- SE = Special exempt
- JE = Junior exempt
- JR = Junior Accelerator Programme entrant
- CO = College Accelerator Programme entrant
- NG = Next Gen Accelerator Program entrant
- w/o = Walkover
- r = Retired
- d = Defaulted

=== Draw ===
First round
2	(United States) Keith Gledhill (United States) Ellsworth Vines	6	6	7
(Australia) Neil Ennis (Australia) Mervyn Weston	3	1	5
5	(Australia) Adrian Quist (Australia) Don Turnbull	6	6	6
(Australia) Basil Fitchett (Australia) Tim Fitchett	2	0	2
(Australia) Jack Cummings (Australia) Harry Hassett	6	7	6
(Australia) Allan Knight (Australia) Bill Ryan	4	5	2
4	(Australia) Jack Clemenger (Australia) Bob Schlesinger	6	7	6
(Australia) Hugh Bauers (Australia) Eric Freak	2	5	2
1	(United States) Wilmer Allison (United States) John Van Ryn	6	7	6
(Australia) Dave Chrystal (Australia) Joe Rogers	3	5	3
(Australia) Harry Hopman (Australia) Vivian McGrath	6	6	6
(Australia) Reg Ewin (Australia) Thomas Robinson	3	0	3
6	(Australia) Jack Purcell (Australia) Bert Tonkin	6	6	8
(Australia) Evan Henry (Australia) Len Schwartz	4	4	6

Quarterfinals
2	(United States) Keith Gledhill (United States) Ellsworth Vines	4	6	4	6	9
5	(Australia) Adrian Quist (Australia) Don Turnbull	6	1	6	3	7
(Australia) Jack Cummings (Australia) Harry Hassett	6	5	6	6
4	(Australia) Jack Clemenger (Australia) Bob Schlesinger	4	7	3	4
1	(United States) Wilmer Allison (United States) John Van Ryn	6	6	6
(Australia) Harry Hopman (Australia) Vivian McGrath	0	2	0
6	(Australia) Jack Purcell (Australia) Bert Tonkin	1	2	6
3	(Australia) Jack Crawford (Australia) Gar Moon	6	6	8

Semifinals
2	(United States) Keith Gledhill (United States) Ellsworth Vines	6	6	7
(Australia) Jack Cummings (Australia) Harry Hassett	2	3	5
1	(United States) Wilmer Allison (United States) John Van Ryn	8	3	4
3	(Australia) Jack Crawford (Australia) Gar Moon	10	6	6

Final
2	(United States) Keith Gledhill (United States) Ellsworth Vines	6	10	6
3	(Australia) Jack Crawford (Australia) Gar Moon	4	8	2
