= Alfred Rushforth =

Australian cricketer

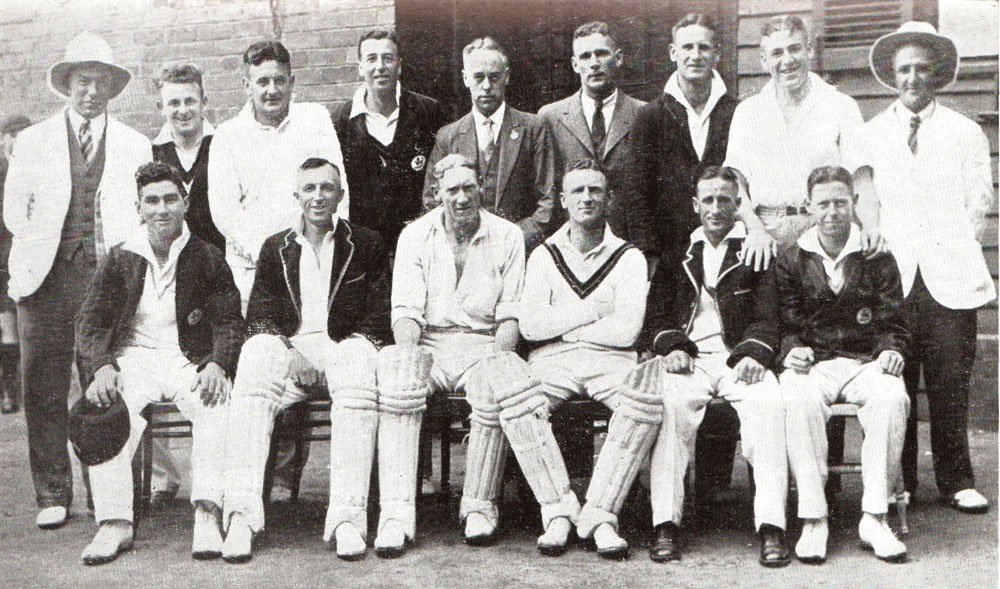
- The Tasmanian cricket team in 1932. Rushforth is seated second from left.

Personal information
- Full name: Alfred William Rushforth
- Born: 23 April 1898; Hobart, Tasmania, Australia
- Died: 30 December 1985 (aged 87); Taroona, Tasmania, Australia
- Batting: Right-handed

Domestic team information
- Years: Team
- 1922-1937: Tasmania

Career statistics
Competition	FC
Matches	24
Runs scored	783
Batting average	18.64
100s/50s	0/3
Top score	73
Balls bowled	0
Wickets	–
Bowling average	–
5 wickets in innings	–
10 wickets in match	–
Best bowling	–
Catches/stumpings	30/–
- Source: Cricinfo, 20 July 2020

Alfred Rushforth (23 April 1898 – 30 December 1985) was an Australian cricketer. He played 24 first-class matches for Tasmania between 1922 and 1937.

For 25 years, Rushforth was employed by the Alexander Patent Racket Company in Launceston, Tasmania. In 1950, he was appointed general manager of the company, a position he held until his resignation in 1959.

== See also ==
- List of Tasmanian representative cricketers
