= 1934 Australian Championships – Women's singles =

Women's singles
- 1934 Australian Championships

Final
- Champion: (Australia) Joan Hartigan
- Runner-up: (Australia) Mall Molesworth
- Score: 6–1, 6–4

Details
- Seeds: 8

Events
Singles	men	women		boys	girls
Doubles	men	women	mixed	boys	girls
- Australian Championships

First-seeded Joan Hartigan defeated Mall Molesworth 6–1, 6–4, in the final to win the women's singles tennis title at the 1934 Australian Championships.

== Seeds ==
The seeded players are listed below. Joan Hartigan is the champion; others show the round in which they were eliminated.

1. (Australia) Joan Hartigan (champion)
2. (Australia) Mall Molesworth (finalist)
3. (Australia) Emily Hood Westacott (quarterfinals)
4. (Australia) Nancy Chitty (first round)
5. (Australia) Nell Hall (quarterfinals)
6. (Australia) Louie Bickerton (semifinals)
7. (Australia) Kathrine Le Mesurier (semifinals)
8. (Australia) Ula Valkenburg (quarterfinals)

== Draw ==
=== Key ===
- Q = Qualifier
- WC = Wild card
- LL = Lucky loser
- r = Retired

=== Finals ===
Quarterfinals
1	(Australia) Joan Hartigan	6	6
8	(Australia) Ula Valkenburg	1	4
4	(Australia) Alison Hattersley	3	1
6	(Australia) Louie Bickerton	6	6
2	(Australia) Mall Molesworth	6	6
5	(Australia) Nell Hall	4	1
3	(Australia) Emily Hood Westacott	6	8	3
7	(Australia) Muriel Wilson	2	10	6

Semifinals
1	(Australia) Joan Hartigan	6	6
6	(Australia) Louie Bickerton	1	3
2	(Australia) Mall Molesworth	7	6
7	(Australia) Muriel Wilson	5	4

Finals
1	(Australia) Joan Hartigan	6	6
2	(Australia) Mall Molesworth	1	4

=== Earlier rounds ===
==== Section 1 ====
First round
1	(Australia) Hartigan	6	8
(Australia) Cox	0	6
(Australia) Corrigan
(Australia) Corbett
8	(Australia) Valkenburg
(Australia) Stevenson
(Australia) Dingle
(Australia) Purdy
4	(Australia) Chitty
(Australia) Hattersley
(Australia) Peach
(Australia) Blick
6	(Australia) Bickerton
(Australia) Bellamy
(Australia) Lewis
(Australia) McTaggett

Second round
1	(Australia) Hartigan	6	6
(Australia) Corrigan	3	1
8	(Australia) Valkenburg
(Australia) Purdy
(Australia) Hattersley
(Australia) Blick
6	(Australia) Bickerton
(Australia) Lewis

Quarterfinals
1	(Australia) Hartigan	6	6
8	(Australia) Valkenburg	1	4
(Australia) Hattersley	3	1
6	(Australia) Bickerton	6	6

Semifinals
1	(Australia) Hartigan	6	6
6	(Australia) Bickerton	1	3

==== Section 2 ====
First round
2	(Australia) Molesworth
(Australia) Chapman
(Australia) O'Connor
(Australia) Commins
5	(Australia) Hall
(Australia) Menzies
(Australia) Bubb
(Australia) Williams
3	(Australia) Westacott
(Australia) Utz
(Australia) Selwyn
(Australia) Lewis
7	(Australia) Le Mesurier
(Australia) Vickery
(Australia) Wilson
(Australia) Stevenson

Second round
2	(Australia) Molesworth
(Australia) O'Connor
5	(Australia) Hall
(Australia) Bubb
3	(Australia) Westacott
(Australia) Lewis
7	(Australia) Le Mesurier
(Australia) Wilson

Quarterfinals
2	(Australia) Molesworth	6	6
5	(Australia) Hall	4	1
3	(Australia) Westacott	6	8	3
(Australia) Wilson	2	10	6

Semifinals
2	(Australia) Molesworth	7	6
(Australia) Wilson	5	4

Preceded by 1933 U.S. National Championships – Women's singles	Grand Slam women's singles	Succeeded by 1934 French Championships – Women's singles
