= 1934 Australian Championships – Men's doubles =

Men's doubles
- 1934 Australian Championships

Final
- Champions: (United Kingdom) Pat Hughes (United Kingdom) Fred Perry
- Runners-up: (Australia) Adrian Quist (Australia) Don Turnbull
- Score: 6–8, 6–3, 6–4, 3–6, 6–3

Details
- Draw: 16 (4 Q )
- Seeds: 4

Events
Singles	men	women		boys	girls
Doubles	men	women	mixed	boys	girls
← 1933 ·	Australian Championships	· 1935 →

The first seeds Pat Hughes and Fred Perry defeated Adrian Quist and Don Turnbull 6–8, 6–3, 6–4, 3–6, 6–3 in the final, to win the men's doubles tennis title at the 1934 Australian Championships.

Twenty five teams have entered for the event in which number of pairs was limited to sixteen. Twelve pairs were placed in the main draw and thirteen had to play in the preliminary rounds. Four semifinalists qualified into the first round of the competition proper.

== Seeds ==
1. (United Kingdom) Pat Hughes / (United Kingdom) Fred Perry (champions)
2. (Australia) Jack Crawford / (Australia) Harry Hopman (semifinals)
3. (Australia) Adrian Quist / (Australia) Don Turnbull (final)
4. (Australia) Vivian McGrath / (Australia) Gar Moon (semifinals)

== Draw ==
=== Key ===
- Q = Qualifier
- WC = Wild card
- LL = Lucky loser
- Alt = Alternate
- ITF = ITF entry
- PR = Protected ranking
- SR = Special ranking
- SE = Special exempt
- JE = Junior exempt
- JR = Junior Accelerator Programme entrant
- CO = College Accelerator Programme entrant
- NG = Next Gen Accelerator Program entrant
- w/o = Walkover
- r = Retired
- d = Defaulted

=== Draw ===
First round
1	(United Kingdom) Pat Hughes (United Kingdom) Fred Perry	6	6	7
Q	(Australia) Eric Freak (Australia) Allan Knight	3	2	5
(Australia) Bruce Moore (Australia) Dave Thompson	5	9	6	3	7
(Australia) Joe Rogers (Australia) Aubrey Willard	7	7	2	6	5
(Australia) Jack Clemenger (Australia) Jack Purcell	6	3	6	6
(Australia) Alfred Chave (Australia) Hughie Goodwin	1	6	3	2
4	(Australia) Vivian McGrath (Australia) Gar Moon	6	6	4	6
Q	(Australia) Reg Ewin (Australia) Abel Kay	1	3	6	4
3	(Australia) Adrian Quist (Australia) Don Turnbull	6	6	6
Q	(Australia) George Kendall (Australia) Toss O'Connor	2	2	2
(New Zealand) Charles Angus (Australia) Ray Dunlop	6	8	3	9	6
(United Kingdom) Harry Lee (United Kingdom) Frank Wilde	1	10	6	7	4
(Australia) Gar Hone (Australia) Len Schwartz	6	6	7
(Australia) Alan Reid (Australia) Bruce Walker	3	1	5
2	(Australia) Jack Crawford (Australia) Harry Hopman	3	6	6	6
Q	(Australia) Dave Chrystal (Australia) Don Ferguson	6	4	3	3

Quarterfinals
1	(United Kingdom) Pat Hughes (United Kingdom) Fred Perry	3	7	6	8
(Australia) Bruce Moore (Australia) Dave Thompson	6	5	1	6
(Australia) Jack Clemenger (Australia) Jack Purcell	2	5	1
4	(Australia) Vivian McGrath (Australia) Gar Moon	6	7	6
3	(Australia) Adrian Quist (Australia) Don Turnbull	6	6	6
(New Zealand) Charles Angus (Australia) Ray Dunlop	2	2	4
(Australia) Gar Hone (Australia) Len Schwartz	3	7	9	10
2	(Australia) Jack Crawford (Australia) Harry Hopman	6	5	11	12

Semifinals
1	(United Kingdom) Pat Hughes (United Kingdom) Fred Perry	6	6	1	7
4	(Australia) Vivian McGrath (Australia) Gar Moon	0	2	6	5
3	(Australia) Adrian Quist (Australia) Don Turnbull	7	4	3	6	6
2	(Australia) Jack Crawford (Australia) Harry Hopman	5	6	6	4	4

Final
1	(United Kingdom) Pat Hughes (United Kingdom) Fred Perry	6	6	6	3	6
3	(Australia) Adrian Quist (Australia) Don Turnbull	8	3	4	6	3
