= 1933 Australian Championships – Women's singles =

Women's singles
- 1933 Australian Championships

Final
- Champion: (Australia) Joan Hartigan
- Runner-up: (Australia) Coral Buttsworth
- Score: 6–4, 6–3

Details
- Draw: 29
- Seeds: 8

Events
Singles	men	women		boys	girls
Doubles	men	women	mixed	boys	girls
- Australian Championships

First-seeded Joan Hartigan defeated Coral Buttsworth 6–4, 6–3, in the final to win the women's singles tennis title at the 1933 Australian Championships.

== Seeds ==
The seeded players are listed below. Joan Hartigan is the champion; others show the round in which they were eliminated.

1. (Australia) Joan Hartigan (champion)
2. (Australia) Coral Buttsworth (finalist)
3. (Australia) Emily Hood Westacott (semifinals)
4. (Australia) Marjorie Crawford (second round)
5. (Australia) Frances Hoddle-Wrigley (semifinals)
6. (Australia) Nell Hall (quarterfinals)
7. (Australia) Mall Molesworth (quarterfinals)
8. (Australia) Nancy Lewis (quarterfinals)

== Draw ==
=== Key ===
- Q = Qualifier
- WC = Wild card
- LL = Lucky loser
- r = Retired

=== Finals ===
Quarterfinals
1	(Australia) Joan Hartigan	4	8	9
7	(Australia) Mall Molesworth	6	6	7
(Australia) Birdie Bond	6	6	4
5	(Australia) Frances Hoddle-Wrigley	3	8	6
2	(Australia) Coral Buttsworth	6	6
6	(Australia) Nell Hall	4	2
3	(Australia) Emily Hood Westacott	6	6
8	(Australia) Nancy Lewis	3	4

Semifinals
1	(Australia) Joan Hartigan	4	6	6
5	(Australia) Frances Hoddle-Wrigley	6	0	4
2	(Australia) Coral Buttsworth	9	3	6
3	(Australia) Emily Hood Westacott	7	6	3

Finals
1	(Australia) Joan Hartigan	6	6
2	(Australia) Coral Buttsworth	4	3

=== Earlier rounds ===
==== Section 1 ====
First round
(Australia) Cox	6	6
(Australia) Mrs. Newton	4	3
7	(Australia) Molesworth	6	6
(Australia) Muirhead	2	2
(Australia) Toyne	6	6
(Australia) Blick	4	2
4	(Australia) Crawford	6	2	9
(Australia) Stevenson	3	6	7
(Australia) Bond	6	3	6
(United States) Van Ryn	4	6	4
5	(Australia) Hoddle-Wrigley	6	6
(Australia) Smith	1	3
(Australia) Woodward	6	3	6
(Australia) Williams	1	6	2

Second round
1	(Australia) Hartigan	6	8
(Australia) Cox	1	6
7	(Australia) Molesworth	4	6	6
(Australia) Toyne	6	1	4
4	(Australia) Crawford
(Australia) Bond	w/o
5	(Australia) Hoddle-Wrigley	6	6
(Australia) Woodward	4	4

Quarterfinals
1	(Australia) Hartigan	4	8	9
7	(Australia) Molesworth	6	6	7
(Australia) Bond	6	6	4
5	(Australia) Hoddle-Wrigley	3	8	6

Semifinals
1	(Australia) Hartigan	4	6	6
5	(Australia) Hoddle-Wrigley	6	0	4

==== Section 2 ====
First round
2	(Australia) Buttsworth	6	6
(Australia) Hardcastle	2	3
(Australia) Anthony	6	6
(Australia) Carcary	4	2
6	(Australia) Hall	6	6
(Australia) Chitty	3	3
(Australia) Derham	6	6
(Australia) Weston	3	4
3	(Australia) Westacott	6	6
(Australia) Glover	2	0
(Australia) Griffiths	6	7
(Australia) McGrath	3	5

Second round
2	(Australia) Buttsworth	6	6
(Australia) Anthony	2	0
6	(Australia) Hall	6	8
(Australia) Derham	3	6
3	(Australia) Westacott	6	6
(Australia) Griffiths	2	3
8	(Australia) Lewis	6	4	6
(Australia) Bellamy	2	6	0

Quarterfinals
2	(Australia) Buttsworth	6	6
6	(Australia) Hall	4	2
3	(Australia) Westacott	6	6
8	(Australia) Lewis	3	4

Semifinals
2	(Australia) Buttsworth	9	3	6
3	(Australia) Westacott	7	6	3

Preceded by 1932 U.S. National Championships – Women's singles	Grand Slam women's singles	Succeeded by 1933 French Championships – Women's singles
