= 1933 Australian Championships – Men's singles =

Men's singles
- 1933 Australian Championships

Final
- Champion: (Australia) Jack Crawford
- Runner-up: (United States) Keith Gledhill
- Score: 2–6, 7–5, 6–3, 6–2

Details
- Draw: 32
- Seeds: 8

Events
| Singles | men | women | | boys | girls |
| Doubles | men | women | mixed | boys | girls |
- Australian Championships

Jack Crawford defeated Keith Gledhill 2–6, 7–5, 6–3, 6–2 in the final to win the men's singles tennis title at the 1933 Australian Championships.

== Seeds ==
The seeded players are listed below. Jack Crawford is the champion; others show the round in which they were eliminated.

1. (United States) Ellsworth Vines (quarterfinals)
2. (Australia) Jack Crawford (champion)
3. (United States) Wilmer Allison (semifinals)
4. (Australia) Harry Hopman (quarterfinals)
5. (United States) John Van Ryn (second round)
6. (Australia) Vivian McGrath (semifinals)
7. (United States) Keith Gledhill (finalist)
8. (Australia) Adrian Quist (quarterfinals)

== Draw ==
=== Key ===
- Q = Qualifier
- WC = Wild card
- LL = Lucky loser
- r = Retired

=== Finals ===
Quarterfinals
1 | (United States) Ellsworth Vines | 3 | 6 | 6 | 5
6 | (Australia) Vivian McGrath | 6 | 2 | 8 | 7
4 | (Australia) Harry Hopman | 6 | 6 | 6 | 0 | 3
7 | (United States) Keith Gledhill | 3 | 2 | 8 | 6 | 6
2 | (Australia) Jack Crawford | 6 | 6 | 6
(Australia) Don Turnbull | 4 | 3 | 2
3 | (United States) Wilmer Allison | 1 | 3 | 9 | 6 | 6
8 | (Australia) Adrian Quist | 6 | 6 | 7 | 2 | 2

Semifinals
6 | (Australia) Vivian McGrath | 4 | 1 | 1
7 | (United States) Keith Gledhill | 6 | 6 | 6
2 | (Australia) Jack Crawford | 6 | 3 | 3 | 6 | 6
3 | (United States) Wilmer Allison | 3 | 6 | 6 | 0 | 3

Final
7 | (United States) Keith Gledhill | 6 | 5 | 3 | 2
2 | (Australia) Jack Crawford | 2 | 7 | 6 | 6

=== Earlier rounds ===
==== Section 1 ====
First round
1 | (United States) Vines | 5 | 6 | 7 | 6
(Australia) Purcell | 7 | 4 | 5 | 4
(Australia) Hassett | 6 | 6 | 6
(Australia) Ryan | 1 | 3 | 3
6 | (Australia) McGrath | 7 | 4 | 6 | 6
(Australia) Weston | 5 | 6 | 2 | 2
(Australia) Tonkin | 6 | 6 | 9
(Australia) Crebbin | 1 | 3 | 7
4 | (Australia) Hopman | 6 | 6 | 6
(Australia) Freak | 2 | 2 | 4
(Australia) Fitchett | 6 | 6 | 6
(Australia) Knight | 4 | 0 | 2
7 | (United States) Gledhill | 3 | 8 | 4 | 6 | 7
(Australia) Schwartz | 6 | 6 | 6 | 1 | 5
(Australia) Clemenger | 6 | 6 | 6
(Australia) Jones | 0 | 0 | 1

Second round
1 | (United States) Vines | 4 | 6 | 6 | 6
(Australia) Hassett | 6 | 1 | 4 | 1
6 | (Australia) McGrath | 4 | 3 | 6 | 7 | 6
(Australia) Tonkin | 6 | 6 | 4 | 5 | 4
4 | (Australia) Hopman | 6 | 6 | 6
(Australia) Fitchett | 1 | 4 | 3
7 | (United States) Gledhill | 6 | 5 | 6 | 6
(Australia) Clemenger | 0 | 7 | 0 | 3

Quarterfinals
1 | (United States) Vines | 3 | 6 | 6 | 5
6 | (Australia) McGrath | 6 | 2 | 8 | 7
4 | (Australia) Hopman | 6 | 6 | 6 | 0 | 3
7 | (United States) Gledhill | 3 | 2 | 8 | 6 | 6

Semifinals
6 | (Australia) McGrath | 4 | 1 | 1
7 | (United States) Gledhill | 6 | 6 | 6

==== Section 2 ====
First round
2 | (Australia) Crawford | 6 | 6 | 6
(Australia) Hancock | 1 | 0 | 4
(Australia) Rogers | 4 | 6 | 6 | 3 | 6
(Australia) Frankenberg | 6 | 1 | 2 | 6 | 3
5 | (United States) Van Ryn | 6 | 2 | 8 | 6
(Australia) Ennis | 3 | 6 | 6 | 4
(Australia) Turnbull | 6 | 6 | 6
(Australia) McCracken | 2 | 2 | 0
3 | (United States) Allison | 6 | 2 | 6 | 6
(Australia) Kay | 2 | 6 | 2 | 4
(Australia) Moon | 6 | 6 | 7
(Australia) Ewin | 1 | 4 | 5
8 | (Australia) Quist | 6 | 8 | 10
(Australia) Henry | 4 | 6 | 8
(Australia) Cummings | 6 | 7 | 3 | 6
(Australia) Chrystal | 2 | 5 | 6 | 4

Second round
2 | (Australia) Crawford | 6 | 6 | 5 | 6
(Australia) Rogers | 2 | 4 | 7 | 0
5 | (United States) Van Ryn | 4 | 8 | 2
(Australia) Turnbull | 6 | 10 | 6
3 | (United States) Allison | 6 | 5 | 6 | 6
(Australia) Moon | 4 | 7 | 3 | 2
8 | (Australia) Quist | 6 | 6 | 9
(Australia) Cummings | 3 | 1 | 7

Quarterfinals
2 | (Australia) Crawford | 6 | 6 | 6
(Australia) Turnbull | 1 | 3 | 2
3 | (United States) Allison | 1 | 3 | 9 | 6 | 6
8 | (Australia) Quist | 6 | 6 | 7 | 2 | 2

Semifinals
2 | (Australia) Crawford | 6 | 3 | 3 | 6 | 6
3 | (United States) Allison | 3 | 6 | 6 | 0 | 3

| Preceded by 1932 U.S. National Championships | Grand Slam men's singles | Succeeded by 1933 French Championships |
