= 1932–33 Sheffield Shield season =

Australian cricket tournament

- Cricket format: First-class
- Tournament format: Double round-robin
- Champions: New South Wales (20th title)
- Participants: 4
- Matches: 12
- Most runs: Don Bradman (New South Wales) (600)
- Most wickets: Clarrie Grimmett (South Australia) (43)

The 1932–33 Sheffield Shield season was the 37th season of the Sheffield Shield, the domestic first-class cricket competition of Australia. New South Wales won the championship.

== Table ==
Team	Played	Won	1st Inns Won	1st Inns Lost	Lost	Drawn	Points
New South Wales	6	5	1	0	0	0	28
Victoria	6	3	0	1	2	0	16
South Australia	6	3	0	0	3	0	15
Queensland	6	0	0	0	6	0	0

== Statistics ==
=== Most runs ===
Don Bradman 600

=== Most wickets ===
Clarrie Grimmett 43
