= Edward Smith (cricketer, born 1911) =

Australian cricketer

Personal information
- Born: 30 July 1911; Nook, Tasmania, Australia
- Died: 26 December 1999 (aged 88); Launceston, Tasmania, Australia

Domestic team information
- Years: Team
- 1930-1939: Tasmania
- Source: Cricinfo, 6 March 2016

Edward Smith (30 July 1911 – 26 December 1999) was an Australian cricketer. He played twelve first-class matches for Tasmania between 1930 and 1939.

== See also ==
- List of Tasmanian representative cricketers
