= 1933 Australian Championships =

- Date: 21-29 January 1933
- Edition: 26th
- Category: Grand Slam (ITF)
- Surface: Grass
- Location: Melbourne, Australia
- Venue: Kooyong Stadium

Champions

Men's singles
- (Australia) Jack Crawford

Women's singles
- (Australia) Joan Hartigan

Men's doubles
- (United States) Keith Gledhill / (United States) Ellsworth Vines

Women's doubles
- (Australia) Mall Molesworth / (Australia) Emily Hood Westacott

Mixed doubles
- (Australia) Marjorie Cox Crawford / (Australia) Jack Crawford

Boys' singles
- (Australia) Adrian Quist

Girls' singles
- (Australia) Nancy Lewis

Boys' doubles
- (Australia) Bert Tonkin / (Australia) Jack Purcell

Girls' doubles
- (Australia) Dot Stevenson / (Australia) Gwen Stevenson
- Australian Championships

The 1933 Australian Championships was a tennis tournament that took place on outdoor Grass courts at the Kooyong Stadium in Melbourne, Australia from 20 January to 31 January. It was the 26th edition of the Australian Championships (now known as the Australian Open), the 7th held in Melbourne, and the first Grand Slam tournament of the year. Australians Jack Crawford and Joan Hartigan won the singles titles.

== Finals ==
=== Men's singles ===
(Australia) Jack Crawford defeated (United States) Keith Gledhill 2–6, 7–5, 6–3, 6–2

=== Women's singles ===
(Australia) Joan Hartigan defeated (Australia) Coral McInnes Buttsworth 6–4, 6–3

=== Men's doubles ===
(United States) Keith Gledhill / (United States) Ellsworth Vines defeated (Australia) Jack Crawford / (Australia) Gar Moon 6–4, 10–8, 6–2

=== Women's doubles ===
(Australia) Mall Molesworth / (Australia) Emily Hood Westacott defeated (Australia) Joan Hartigan / (United States) Marjorie Gladman Van Ryn 6–3, 6–3

=== Mixed doubles ===
(Australia) Marjorie Cox Crawford / (Australia) Jack Crawford defeated (United States) Marjorie Gladman Van Ryn / (United States) Ellsworth Vines 3–6, 7–5, 13–11

Preceded by 1932 U.S. National Championships	Grand Slams	Succeeded by 1933 French Championships
