= 1934 Australian Championships – Men's singles =

Men's singles
- 1934 Australian Championships

Final
- Champion: (United Kingdom) Fred Perry
- Runner-up: (Australia) Jack Crawford
- Score: 6–3, 7–5, 6–1

Details
- Draw: 32 (4Q)
- Seeds: 8

Events
Singles	men	women		boys	girls
Doubles	men	women	mixed	boys	girls
- Australian Championships

Fred Perry defeated Jack Crawford 6–3, 7–5, 6–1 in the final to win the men's singles tennis title at the 1934 Australian Championships.

== Seeds ==
The seeded players are listed below. Fred Perry is the champion; others show the round in which they were eliminated.

1. (Australia) Jack Crawford (finalist)
2. (United Kingdom) Fred Perry (champion)
3. (Australia) Vivian McGrath (semifinals)
4. (Australia) Adrian Quist (semifinals)
5. (Australia) Harry Hopman (quarterfinals)
6. (United Kingdom) Harry Lee (quarterfinals)
7. (United Kingdom) Patrick Hughes (quarterfinals)
8. (Australia) Edgar Moon (quarterfinals)

== Draw ==
=== Key ===
- Q = Qualifier
- WC = Wild card
- LL = Lucky loser
- r = Retired

=== Finals ===
Quarterfinals
1	(Australia) Jack Crawford	6	7	3	6
6	(United Kingdom) Harry Lee	2	5	6	2
4	(Australia) Adrian Quist	6	6	6
8	(Australia) Edgar Moon	3	3	1
2	(United Kingdom) Fred Perry	6	6	6
5	(Australia) Harry Hopman	3	4	3
3	(Australia) Vivian McGrath	6	6	6
7	(United Kingdom) Patrick Hughes	4	4	3

Semifinals
1	(Australia) Jack Crawford	6	6	6
4	(Australia) Adrian Quist	4	2	2
2	(United Kingdom) Fred Perry	2	5	6	6	6
3	(Australia) Vivian McGrath	6	7	4	4	1

Final
1	(Australia) Jack Crawford	3	5	1
2	(United Kingdom) Fred Perry	6	7	6

=== Earlier rounds ===
==== Section 1 ====
First round
1	(Australia) Crawford	6	6	6
Q	(Australia) Betts	0	0	0
(United Kingdom) Wilde	8	6	7
(Australia) Chrystal	6	3	5
6	(United Kingdom) Lee	0	7	6	4	6
(Australia) Kay	6	5	3	6	1
(Australia) Schwartz	6	3	3	1
(Australia) Ewin	2	6	6	6

Second round
1	(Australia) Crawford	6	6	6
(United Kingdom) Wilde	3	3	4
6	(United Kingdom) Lee	6	4	6	6
(Australia) Ewin	3	6	2	3

Quarterfinals
1	(Australia) Crawford	6	7	3	6
6	(United Kingdom) Lee	2	5	6	2

==== Section 2 ====
First round
4	(Australia) Quist	6	6	3	6
Q	(Australia) Henry	4	4	6	3
(Australia) A. Willard	6	6	6
(Australia) Knight	1	2	0
8	(Australia) Moon	6	6	6
(Australia) Ennis	0	2	0
(Australia) Purcell	3	6	10	6
(New Zealand) Angus	6	3	8	3

Second round
4	(Australia) Quist	7	6	6
(Australia) A. Willard	5	2	2
8	(Australia) Moon	2	6	6	6
(Australia) Purcell	6	4	4	1

Quarterfinals
4	(Australia) Quist	6	6	6
8	(Australia) Moon	3	3	1

==== Section 3 ====
First round
2	(United Kingdom) Perry	6	6	2	6
Q	(Australia) Poidevin	3	2	6	2
(Australia) Dunlop	3	6	2	4
(Australia) Rodgers	6	3	6	6
5	(Australia) Hopman	6	3	8	6
(Australia) Moore	4	6	6	1
(Australia) Thompson	w/o
(New Zealand) Malfroy

Second round
2	(United Kingdom) Perry	6	8	6
(Australia) Rodgers	0	6	3
5	(Australia) Hopman	4	6	6	7
(Australia) Thompson	6	3	3	5

Quarterfinals
2	(United Kingdom) Perry	6	6	6
5	(Australia) Hopman	3	4	3

==== Section 4 ====
First round
3	(Australia) McGrath	6	6	6
Q	(Australia) Kendall	0	1	0
(Australia) Walker	6	6	6
(Australia) Goodwin	1	4	2
7	(United Kingdom) Hughes	4	6	2	7	7
(Australia) Hone	6	4	6	5	5
(Australia) Reid	6	4	2
(Australia) Turnbull	8	6	6

Second round
3	(Australia) McGrath	9	6	4	3	6
(Australia) Walker	7	3	6	6	3
7	(United Kingdom) Hughes	4	6	6	4	6
(Australia) Turnbull	6	3	4	6	4

Quarterfinals
3	(Australia) McGrath	6	6	6
7	(United Kingdom) Hughes	4	4	3

Preceded by 1933 U.S. National Championships	Grand Slam men's singles	Succeeded by 1934 French Championships
