= 1933 French Championships – Men's singles =

Men's singles
- 1933 French Championships

Final
- Champion: (Australia) Jack Crawford
- Runner-up: (France) Henri Cochet
- Score: 8–6, 6–1, 6–3

Details
- Seeds: 16

Events
Singles	men	women
Doubles	men	women
- French Championships

Second-seeded Jack Crawford defeated first-seeded, and reigning champion, Henri Cochet 8–6, 6–1, 6–3 in the final to win the men's singles tennis title at the 1933 French Championships. Jack Crawford was the first non-Frenchman to win the French Open men's singles title.

== Seeds ==
The seeded players are listed below. Jack Crawford is the champion; others show the round in which they were eliminated.

1. (France) Henri Cochet (finalist)
2. (Australia) Jack Crawford (champion)
3. (United Kingdom) Fred Perry (quarterfinals)
4. (Germany) Daniel Prenn (fourth round)
5. (Italy) Giorgio de Stefani (fourth round)
6. (Japan) Jiro Satoh (semifinals)
7. (United States) Frank Shields (fourth round)
8. (Czechoslovakia) Roderich Menzel (quarterfinals)
9. (Australia) Vivian McGrath (second round)
10. (France) Christian Boussus (quarterfinals)
11. (South Africa) Colin Robbins (fourth round)
12. (Japan) Ryosuke Nunoi (third round)
13. (United Kingdom) Harry Lee (semifinals)
14. (Netherlands) Hendrik Timmer (second round)
15. (United Kingdom) Patrick Hughes (third round)
16. (South Africa) Vernon Kirby (second round)

== Draw ==
=== Key ===
- Q = Qualifier
- WC = Wild card
- LL = Lucky loser
- r = Retired

=== Finals ===
Quarterfinals
1	(France) Henri Cochet	7	6	6
8	(Czechoslovakia) Roderich Menzel	5	4	1
13	(United Kingdom) Harry Lee	10	6	5	6
(France) Marcel Bernard	8	4	7	0
6	(Japan) Jiro Satoh	1	7	6	2	6
3	(United Kingdom) Fred Perry	6	5	4	6	2
10	(France) Christian Boussus	3	3	1
2	(Australia) Jack Crawford	6	6	6

Semifinals
1	(France) Henri Cochet	9	6	6	6
13	(United Kingdom) Harry Lee	11	3	3	3
6	(Japan) Jiro Satoh	0	2	2
2	(Australia) Jack Crawford	6	6	6

Final
1	(France) Henri Cochet	6	1	3
2	(Australia) Jack Crawford	8	6	6

=== Earlier rounds ===
==== Section 1 ====
First round

Second round
1	(France) Cochet	7	6	3	6
(Czechoslovakia) Novotny	5	1	6	4
(Monaco) Landau
(France) Papillon
16	(South Africa) Kirby
(France) Guillemot
(Japan) Itoh	7	6	7
(France) Landry	5	4	5

Third round
1	(France) Cochet	6	7	6
(France) Papillon	0	5	2
(France) Guillemot	7	3	3	3
(Japan) Itoh	5	6	6	6

Fourth round
1	(France) Cochet	6	6	6
(Japan) Itoh	1	2	4

==== Section 2 ====
First round

Second round
8	(Czechoslovakia) Menzel	6	6	6
(France) Merlin	4	2	3
(Italy) Fe' d'Ostiani	6	4	6	6
(France) Desloges	4	6	3	3
9	(Australia) McGrath	6	2	9	5
(Poland) Hebda	8	6	7	7
(United Kingdom) Wilde
(France) Barrelet De Ricou

Third round
8	(Czechoslovakia) Menzel	7	8	6
(Italy) Fe' d'Ostiani	5	6	4
(Poland) Hebda	2	3	4
(United Kingdom) Wilde	6	6	6

Fourth round
8	(Czechoslovakia) Menzel	6	6	6
(United Kingdom) Wilde	3	1	4

==== Section 3 ====
First round
(France) Gentien	6	6	6
(Hungary) Gabrowitz	2	2	3
13	(United Kingdom) Lee	6	6	6
(France) Leven	4	3	3
(France) Contanson	6	6	4	8
(France) Siguier	1	4	6	6
(Switzerland) Fisher	6	6	7
(France) Laurent	4	1	5
(France) Troncin
(France) Arago

Second round
4	(Germany) Prenn	6	6	6
(France) Bouy	2	1	2
(France) Chevalier	0	5	8	1
(France) Gentien	6	7	6	6
13	(United Kingdom) Lee	6	6	6
(France) Contanson	4	4	3
(Switzerland) Fisher	6	6	6
(France) Troncin	0	1	1

Third round
4	(Germany) Prenn	9	4	7	6
(France) Gentien	7	6	5	2
13	(United Kingdom) Lee	3	4	6	6	6
(Switzerland) Fisher	6	6	1	4	3

Fourth round
4	(Germany) Prenn	5	6	4	1
13	(United Kingdom) Lee	7	3	6	6

==== Section 4 ====
First round
5	(Italy) de Stefani	6	2	6	6
(Czechoslovakia) Hecht	4	6	1	3
(France) Rodel	6	6	6
(United States) Baer	0	0	0
(Czechoslovakia) Benda
(France) Brugnon
(France) Couiteas
(France) Aslangul
12	(Japan) Nunoi	4	6	6	6
(France) De Buzelet	6	3	3	2
(Australia) Quist
(France) Martin-Legeay
(South Africa) Farquharson	6	7	6
(France) Bernard	3	5	4
(France) Vieillard	4	2	1
(France) Bernard	6	6	6

Second round
5	(Italy) de Stefani	6	6	2	6
(France) Rodel	2	4	6	1
(France) Brugnon	6	7	6
(France) Aslangul	3	5	2
12	(Japan) Nunoi	2	2	6	6	6
(Australia) Quist	6	6	1	1	4
(South Africa) Farquharson	9	6	6	3	4
(France) Bernard	7	1	8	6	6

Third round
5	(Italy) de Stefani	6	6	6
(France) Brugnon	4	3	2
12	(Japan) Nunoi	2	4	3
(France) Bernard	6	6	6

Fourth round
5	(Italy) de Stefani	4	5	9	6	1
(France) Bernard	6	7	7	0	6

==== Section 5 ====
First round
(Switzerland) Chiesa	1	1	0
(Belgium) Lacroix	6	6	6
(France) Merlin	2	6	6	1	6
(France) Journu	6	1	1	6	2
(France) George	9	6	2	6
(France) Terrier	7	2	6	3
(France) Lesueur	1	6	0	1
11	(South Africa) Robbins	6	1	6	6
(Czechoslovakia) Koželuh	3	4	7	3
(France) Goldschmidt	6	6	5	6
(Kingdom of Yugoslavia) Punčec	6	1	6	6
(France) Samazeuilh	1	6	0	1
(Italy) Palmieri	3	4	6	6	6
(France) Berthet	6	6	4	1	3
(France) Feret	4	4	10	6	2
6	(Japan) Satoh	6	6	8	2	6

Second round
(Belgium) Lacroix	6	2	4	7	2
(France) Merlin	3	6	6	5	6
(France) George	0	6	6	6	3
11	(South Africa) Robbins	6	8	3	3	6
(France) Goldschmidt	3	1	2
(Kingdom of Yugoslavia) Punčec	6	6	6
(Italy) Palmieri	3	4	3
6	(Japan) Satoh	6	6	6

Third round
(France) Merlin	6	2	8
11	(South Africa) Robbins	8	6	10
(Kingdom of Yugoslavia) Punčec	2	2	4
6	(Japan) Satoh	6	6	6

Fourth round
11	(South Africa) Robbins	1	5	6	6	1
6	(Japan) Satoh	6	7	4	3	6

==== Section 6 ====
First round
(France) Glasser
(Republic of Ireland) Rogers Lyttelton
(France) Combemale	4	4	3
(France) Roche	6	6	6
(France) Augustin	1	3	0
(Czechoslovakia) Malacek	6	6	6
(Romania) Mishu
14	(Netherlands) Timmer
(France) Rimet
(France) Magaloff

Second round
(Republic of Ireland) Rogers Lyttelton	5	4	6	6	6
(France) Roche	7	6	1	4	4
(Czechoslovakia) Malacek	5	6	6	4	8
14	(Netherlands) Timmer	7	2	3	6	6
(France) Rimet	2	6	6	6
(Australia) Turnbull	6	2	3	4
(France) Billaudot	1	1	2
3	(United Kingdom) Perry	6	6	6

Third round
(Republic of Ireland) Rogers Lyttelton	6	6	4
(Czechoslovakia) Malacek	8	8	6
(France) Rimet	3	3	3
3	(United Kingdom) Perry	6	6	6

Fourth round
(Czechoslovakia) Malacek	0	6	5	3
3	(United Kingdom) Perry	6	4	7	6

==== Section 7 ====
First round

Second round
(Switzerland) Steiner
(South Africa) Condon
(France) Piel	1	1	2
10	(France) Boussus	6	6	6
(Hungary) Von Kehrling	6	4	2	6	12
(Italy) Sertorio	3	6	6	3	10
(France) Thurneyssen	4	1	0
7	(United States) Shields	6	6	6

Third round
(South Africa) Condon	2	2	4
10	(France) Boussus	6	6	6
(Hungary) Von Kehrling	6	7	4	2	5
7	(United States) Shields	2	5	6	6	7

Fourth round
10	(France) Boussus	6	6	2	6
7	(United States) Shields	3	2	6	4

==== Section 8 ====
First round

Second round
(Belgium) De Borman	6	0	3	7	4
(Czechoslovakia) Rohrer	4	6	6	5	6
(Switzerland) Ellmer	3	1	4
15	(United Kingdom) Hughes	6	6	6
(Monaco) Galeppe
(Japan) Miki
(Poland) Tloczynski	3	1	4
2	(Australia) Crawford	6	6	6

Third round
(Czechoslovakia) Rohrer
15	(United Kingdom) Hughes
(Japan) Miki	6	3	8	4
2	(Australia) Crawford	2	6	10	6

Fourth round
(Czechoslovakia) Rohrer	5	6	3	7
2	(Australia) Crawford	7	1	6	9

Preceded by 1933 Australian Championships	Grand Slams; Men's Singles	Succeeded by 1933 Wimbledon Championships
