= Harry Hassett =

Australian tennis player

- Full name: Alexander Henry "Harry" Hassett
- Country (sports): Australia
- Born: 1905 Geelong, Victoria, Australia
- Died: 16 December 1971 (aged 65–66) Geelong, Victoria, Australia
- Turned pro: 1925 (amateur tour)
- Retired: 1940

Singles

Grand Slam singles results
- Australian Open: QF (1931)

Doubles

Grand Slam doubles results
- Australian Open: SF (1933)

Mixed doubles

Grand Slam mixed doubles results
- Australian Open: QF (1933)

Harry Hassett (1905–1971) was an Australian tennis player. He was the brother of cricket legend Lindsay Hassett and was a fine cricket all-rounder himself, but tennis took priority over cricket for Harry. Sporting Globe described Hassett's tennis game by saying he was "sound in all departments of the game except his second serve, which is decidedly weak, and strong physically". Hassett had a great backhand. Hassett made his debut at the Australian championships in 1930 and lost in five sets to Harry Hopman in round three. In 1931 he lost in the quarter finals to Jack Cummings. In 1933 he took the first set from top seed Ellsworth Vines but lost in four sets in round two.

His other career singles highlights include winning the Royal South Yarra Championships in 1933.
