= Ula Valkenburg =

Australian tennis player

- Country (sports): Australia
- Born: 1901; Australia
- Died: 16 May 1988; Gordon, New South Wales, Australia
- Plays: Right-handed

Singles

Grand Slam singles results
- Australian Open: QF (1934)

Doubles

Grand Slam doubles results
- Australian Open: F (1934)

Grand Slam mixed doubles results
- Australian Open: SF (1931)

Ula Valkenburg (1901 – 16 May 1988) was an Australian tennis player who was active in the 1920s and 1930s.

Valkenburg reached the quarterfinals of the singles event at the Australian Championships in 1931 which she lost to Joan Hartigan. In 1934 she teamed-up with Hartigan to compete in the women's doubles event at the Australian Championships. The pair reached the final where they were beaten by compatriots Emily Hood Westacott and Margaret Molesworth in three sets. In the mixed doubles event she reached the semifinal at the 1931 Australian Championships with Charles Donahue.

In January 1931 she was defeated in the singles final of the New South Wales Championships by Marjorie Cox Crawford. Valkenburg was a runner-up at the 1934 New South Wales Hard Court Championships, losing in the final in three sets to Iris Luckie.

== Grand Slam finals ==
=== Doubles (1 runner-ups) ===
Result	Year	Championship	Surface	Partner	Opponents	Score
Loss	1934	Australian Championships	Grass	(Australia) Joan Hartigan	(Australia) Emily Hood Westacott (Australia) Margaret Molesworth	8–6, 4–6, 4–6
