= Marjorie Gladman =

American tennis player

- Full name: Marjorie Katherine Gladman Van Ryn
- Country (sports): United States
- Born: June 21, 1908 Santa Monica, CA, U.S.
- Died: November 9, 1999 (aged 91) Peterborough, NH, U.S.

Singles

Grand Slam singles results
- Wimbledon: 4R (1931)
- US Open: QF (1937)

Doubles

Grand Slam doubles results
- Australian Open: F (1933)
- Wimbledon: QF (1931)
- US Open: W (1936)

Grand Slam mixed doubles results
- Australian Open: F (1933)
- Wimbledon: 4R (1936)

Marjorie Katherine "Midge" Gladman Van Ryn (née Gladman; June 21, 1908 – November 9, 1999) was an American amateur tennis player in the early part of the 20th century.

Gladman played collegiate tennis at the University of Southern California. She was ranked in the U.S. top 10 nine times between 1928 and 1937, with her highest ranking at No. 4 coming in 1937.

She won the doubles title at the 1936 U.S. National Championships, partnering Carolin Babcock, and was a doubles finalist in 1937 and 1940.

In 1928, she won the singles title in Cincinnati (defeating Clara Louise Zinke in the final), the Canadian National singles title, and the Western singles championship. She paired with Zinke to win the 1928 Western doubles title. In 1929, she won the singles and doubles titles at both the women's intercollegiate tournament in Boston and the Middle States singles title in Philadelphia. She also won the Delaware State singles title and was a finalist in doubles and mixed doubles there.

In 1931 and 1936, she participated in the Wimbledon Championships and reached a fourth round in the singles (1931), a quarterfinal in the women's doubles (1931), and a fourth round in the mixed doubles (1936). In March 1936 she won the U.S. Indoor Championships defeating Norma Taubele in straight sets. At the same tournament she won the doubles title in 1932, 1949, 1950, 1951 and 1960.

On 22 October 1930, she married John Van Ryn, who was inducted into the International Tennis Hall of Fame in 1963. The marriage did not last, and on March 1, 1947, she married Richard Buck.

In 1954, she was presented with the USTA Service Bowl Award, and in 1991, she was inducted into the USTA New England Hall of Fame.

== Grand Slam finals ==
=== Doubles (1 title, 3 runner-ups) ===
Result	Year	Championship	Surface	Partner	Opponents	Score
Loss	1933	Australian Championships	Grass	(Australia) Joan Hartigan	(Australia) Margaret Molesworth (Australia) Emily Hood Westacott	3–6, 2–6
Win	1936	U.S. National Championships	Grass	(United States) Carolin Babcock	(United States) Helen Jacobs (United States) Sarah Palfrey Fabyan	9–7, 2–6, 6–4
Loss	1937	U.S. National Championships	Grass	(United States) Carolin Babcock	(United States) Sarah Palfrey Fabyan (United States) Alice Marble	5–7, 4–6
Loss	1940	U.S. National Championships	Grass	(United States) Dorothy Bundy	(United States) Sarah Palfrey (United States) Alice Marble	4–6, 3–6

=== Mixed doubles (1 runner-up) ===
Result	Year	Championship	Surface	Partner	Opponents	Score
Loss	1933	Australian Championships	Grass	(United States) Ellsworth Vines	(Australia) Marjorie Cox Crawford (Australia) Jack Crawford	6–3, 5–7, 11–13
