= Margaret Molesworth =

Australian tennis player (1894–1985)

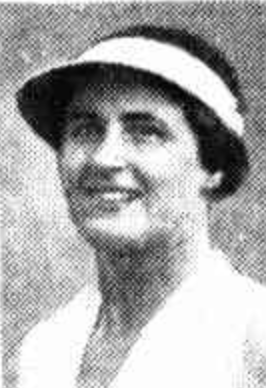
- Margaret Molesworth, c. 1941
- Full name: Maud Margaret Mutch Molesworth
- Country (sports): Australia
- Born: 18 October 1894 Brisbane, Queensland, Australia
- Died: 9 July 1985 (aged 90) Sydney, New South Wales, Australia

Singles
- Highest ranking: No. 10 (1922)

Grand Slam singles results
- Australian Open: W (1922, 1923)
- French Open: 3R (1934)
- Wimbledon: 1R (1934)

Doubles

Grand Slam doubles results
- Australian Open: W (1930, 1933, 1934)
- Wimbledon: 3R (1934)

Grand Slam mixed doubles results
- Australian Open: F (1923)

Maud Margaret "Mall" Molesworth BEM (née Mutch; 18 October 1894 – 9 July 1985) was an Australian tennis player who won the inaugural Australasian Championships women's singles title in 1922 and successfully defended her title in 1923.

== Tennis career ==
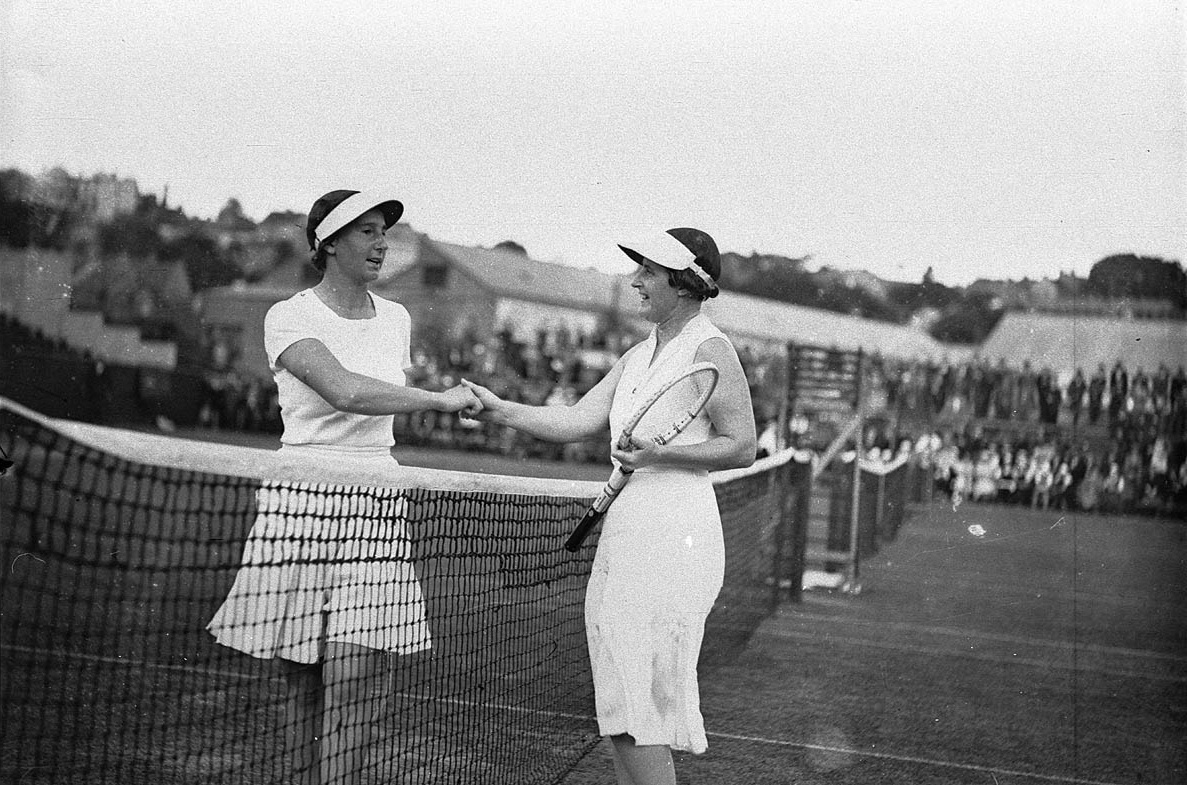
Molesworth and Dorothy Round, 1934

Molesworth won her first major tennis title in 1914 – the Queensland ladies doubles. For much of the next five years, sporting contests in Australia were cancelled due to World War I.

Molesworth won tennis championships in New South Wales, Victoria, South Australia and Tasmania beginning in 1919. At the first Australian Championships in 1922, she defeated fellow Australian Esna Boyd Robertson 6–3, 10–8 in the final. A year later, she successfully defended her title, again defeating Robertson in the final.

Molesworth was unable to compete overseas until 1934 when, at age 40, she reached the last sixteen of the French Championships. At the 1934 Wimbledon Championships, she lost in the first round of the singles event to Madzy Rollin Couquerque and reached the third round of the doubles with Joan Hartigan.

In doubles, Molesworth won three women's titles at the Australian Championships with Emily Hood Westacott, in 1930, 1933 and 1934. She was also runner-up in women's and mixed doubles at the Australian Championships in 1923.

Molesworth was the first Australian woman tennis player to be listed in the world's top-ten rankings. A. Wallis Myers of the Daily Telegraph rated her No. 10 in 1922 and 1923.

In 1924, mainly for health reasons, Molesworth retired from the sport. She came back a few years later, always considered a threat in Australian tournaments. In 1934, she reached the Australian singles final once more. Later that year, she competed overseas for the first time, playing at Wimbledon and the French Championships.

== Retirement ==
After her retirement from competitive play, Molesworth became one of the first female professional coaches in Australia. Until her death in 1985, she maintained a lifelong interest in the sport of tennis.

In the 1972 Queen's Birthday Honours, Molesworth received the British Empire Medal (BEM) for "service to the community of Ku-ring-gai, New South Wales.

== Personal life ==
On 19 June 1918, in Brisbane, Molesworth married Bevil Hugh Molesworth (1891–1971), an educator and radio broadcaster.

Molesworth died at her home in Lindfield on 9 July 1985. Her only son, Hugh (born 1925), predeceased her in 1960. On 25 January 2022 Maude Margaret Molesworth and Joan Hartigan were inducted into the Australian Tennis Hall of Fame at a ceremony at Rod Laver Arena.

== Grand Slam finals ==
=== Singles: 3 (2 titles, 1 runner-up) ===
Result	Year	Championship	Surface	Opponent	Score
Win	1922	Australian Championships	Grass	(Australia) Esna Boyd Robertson	6–3, 10–8
Win	1923	Australian Championships	Grass	(Australia) Esna Boyd Robertson	6–1, 7–5
Loss	1934	Australian Championships	Grass	(Australia) Joan Hartigan	1–6, 4–6

=== Doubles: 4 (4 titles) ===
Result	Year	Championship	Surface	Partner	Opponents	Score
Loss	1923	Australian Championships	Grass	(Australia) Beryl Turner	(Australia) Esna Boyd Robertson (Australia) Sylvia Lance Harper	1–6, 4–6
Win	1930	Australian Championships	Grass	(Australia) Emily Hood Westacott	(Australia) Marjorie Cox Crawford (Australia) Sylvia Lance Harper	6–3, 0–6, 7–5
Win	1933	Australian Championships	Grass	(Australia) Emily Hood Westacott	(Australia) Joan Hartigan (United States) Marjorie Gladman	6–3, 6–2
Win	1934	Australian Championships	Grass	(Australia) Emily Hood Westacott	(Australia) Joan Hartigan (Australia) Ula Valkenburg	6–8, 6–4, 6–4

=== Mixed doubles: 1 (1 runner-up) ===
Result	Year	Championship	Surface	Partner	Opponents	Score
Loss	1923	Australian Championships	Grass	(Australia) Bert St. John	(Australia) Sylvia Lance Harper (Australia) Horace Rice	6–2, 4–6, 4–6

== Grand Slam singles tournament timeline ==
Key
W	F	SF	QF	#R	RR	Q#	DNQ	A	NH

(W) winner; (F) finalist; (SF) semifinalist; (QF) quarterfinalist; (#R) rounds 4, 3, 2, 1; (RR) round-robin stage; (Q#) qualification round; (DNQ) did not qualify; (A) absent; (NH) not held; (SR) strike rate (events won / competed); (W–L) win–loss record.

Tournament	1922	1923	1924	1925	1926	1927	1928	1929	1930	1931	1932	1933	1934	1935	Career SR
Australian Championships	W	W	QF	A	A	A	QF	QF	QF	1R	A	QF	F	2R	2 / 10
French Championships^{1}	A	A	NH	A	A	A	A	A	A	A	A	A	3R	A	0 / 1
Wimbledon	A	A	A	A	A	A	A	A	A	A	A	A	1R	A	0 / 1
US Championships	A	A	A	A	A	A	A	A	A	A	A	A	A	A	0 / 0
SR	1 / 1	1 / 1	0 / 1	0 / 0	0 / 0	0 / 0	0 / 1	0 / 1	0 / 1	0 / 1	0 / 0	0 / 1	0 / 3	0 / 1	2 / 12

^{1}Through 1923, the French Championships were open only to French nationals. The World Hard Court Championships (WHCC), actually played on clay in Paris or Brussels, began in 1912 and were open to all nationalities. The results from the 1922 and 1923 editions of that tournament are shown here. The Olympics replaced the WHCC in 1924, as the Olympics were held in Paris. Beginning in 1925, the French Championships were open to all nationalities, with the results shown here beginning with that year.

== See also ==
- Performance timelines for all female tennis players since 1978 who reached at least one Grand Slam final
