= Joan Hartigan =

Australian tennis player (1912–2000)

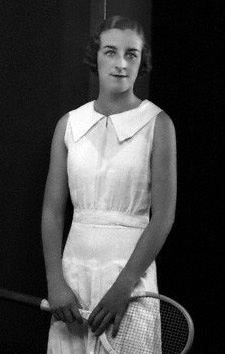
- Hartigan in 1935
- Full name: Joan Marcia Bathurst Hartigan
- Country (sports): Australia
- Born: 6 June 1912 Sydney, Australia
- Died: 31 August 2000 (aged 88) Sydney, New South Wales
- Plays: Right-handed

Singles
- Highest ranking: No. 8 (1934, A. Wallis Myers)

Grand Slam singles results
- Australian Open: W (1933, 1934, 1936)
- French Open: 3R (1934)
- Wimbledon: SF (1934, 1935)

Doubles

Grand Slam doubles results
- Australian Open: F (1933, 1934, 1940)
- French Open: 2R (1934)
- Wimbledon: QF (1935)

Grand Slam mixed doubles results
- Australian Open: W (1937)
- Wimbledon: QF (1935)

Joan Marcia Bathurst (née Hartigan; 6 June 1912 – 31 August 2000) was an Australian Champion tennis player who was active from the early 1930s until the late 1940s.

== Early life and education ==
Joan Marcia Hartigan was born in Sydney, the daughter of Thomas Joseph (Tom) Hartigan, a railways commissioner, and Imelda Josephine, née Boylson, a schoolteacher; the couple wed on 26 March 1908 at St Thomas's Catholic Church, Lewisham, New South Wales. Tom Hartigan was a clerk in the New South Wales Government Railways and eventually became Railways Commissioner. Joan was educated at the all-girls' Loreto Kirribilli, in the lower north shore of Sydney.

== Tennis career ==
Hartigan learnt to play tennis at the Loreto Convent. She won the NSW junior singles and doubles title and the Australian girls' championship in 1931. In late January 1932 she defeated Margaret Molesworth in the singles final of the New Zealand Championships. In March that year she won the singles title at the New South Wales Championships after a straight-sets victory in the final against Molesworth. Hartigan won the singles title at the Australian Championships in 1933, 1934 and 1936 (Note: She did not take part in the 1935 Australian Championships on advice from her doctor.) and was a semifinalist at Wimbledon in 1934 (losing to first-seeded Helen Jacobs) and 1935 (losing to eventual champion Helen Wills Moody). During her stay in Britain in 1934 she won the singles titles at the North of England Championships and the Scottish Championships, both after a win in the final against Susan Noel.

Hartigan three times reached the women's doubles final at the Australian Championships, in 1933, 1934, and 1940. Bathurst teamed with Edgar Moon to win the mixed doubles title at the 1934 Australian Championships. According to A. Wallis Myers of The Daily Telegraph and the Daily Mail, Bathurst was ranked in the world top 10 in 1934 and 1935, reaching a career high of world No. 8 in these rankings in 1934.

She was known for her power game with a hard-hitting forehand drive as her main strength. Hartigan hit her backhand with the same side of the racket as her forehand.

Hartigan was posthumously inducted into the Australian Tennis Hall of Fame in January 2022 at a ceremony at the Rod Laver Arena.

== Personal and family life ==
In January, 1943 she enlisted in the Australian Army; she served with the Australian Army Medical Women's Service at a Camp Hospital in Sydney and was discharged on 1 September 1943. In 1946, she announced her engagement to Hugh Moxon Bathurst of Melbourne who was then private secretary to Senator James Fraser, Chifley's Health minister. They married at St Mary's Cathedral, Sydney on Saturday, 12 April 1947, before flying to Adelaide then Perth to board the RMS Orion at Fremantle for England where they planned to live for a few years while she resumed her tennis career at Wimbledon. In 1950, they returned on the Strathmore after living in Surrey for three years and settled in Sydney. Joan Bathurst died on 31 August 2000, and her husband died 16 April 2001. Their son, Thomas Frederick Bathurst became Chief Justice of New South Wales.

== Grand Slam finals ==
=== Singles (3 titles) ===
Result	Year	Championship	Surface	Opponent	Score
Win	1933	Australian Championships	Grass	(Australia) Coral Buttsworth	6–4, 6–3
Win	1934	Australian Championships	Grass	(Australia) Margaret Molesworth	6–1, 6–4
Win	1936	Australian Championships	Grass	(Australia) Nancye Wynne	6–4, 6–4

=== Doubles (3 runner-ups) ===
Result	Year	Championship	Surface	Partner	Opponents	Score
Loss	1933	Australian Championships	Grass	(United States) Marjorie Gladman Van Ryn	(Australia) Emily Hood Westacott (Australia) Margaret Molesworth	3–6, 3–6
Loss	1934	Australian Championships	Grass	(Australia) Ula Valkenburg	(Australia) Emily Hood Westacott (Australia) Margaret Molesworth	8–6, 4–6, 4–6
Loss	1940	Australian Championships	Grass	(Australia) Edith Niemeyer	(Australia) Thelma Coyne Long (Australia) Nancye Wynne Bolton	5–7, 2–6

=== Mixed doubles (1 win) ===
Result	Year	Championship	Surface	Partner	Opponents	Score
Win	1934	Australian Championships	Grass	(Australia) Edgar Moon	(Australia) Emily Hood Westacott (Australia) Ray Dunlop	6–3, 6–4

== Grand Slam singles tournament timeline ==
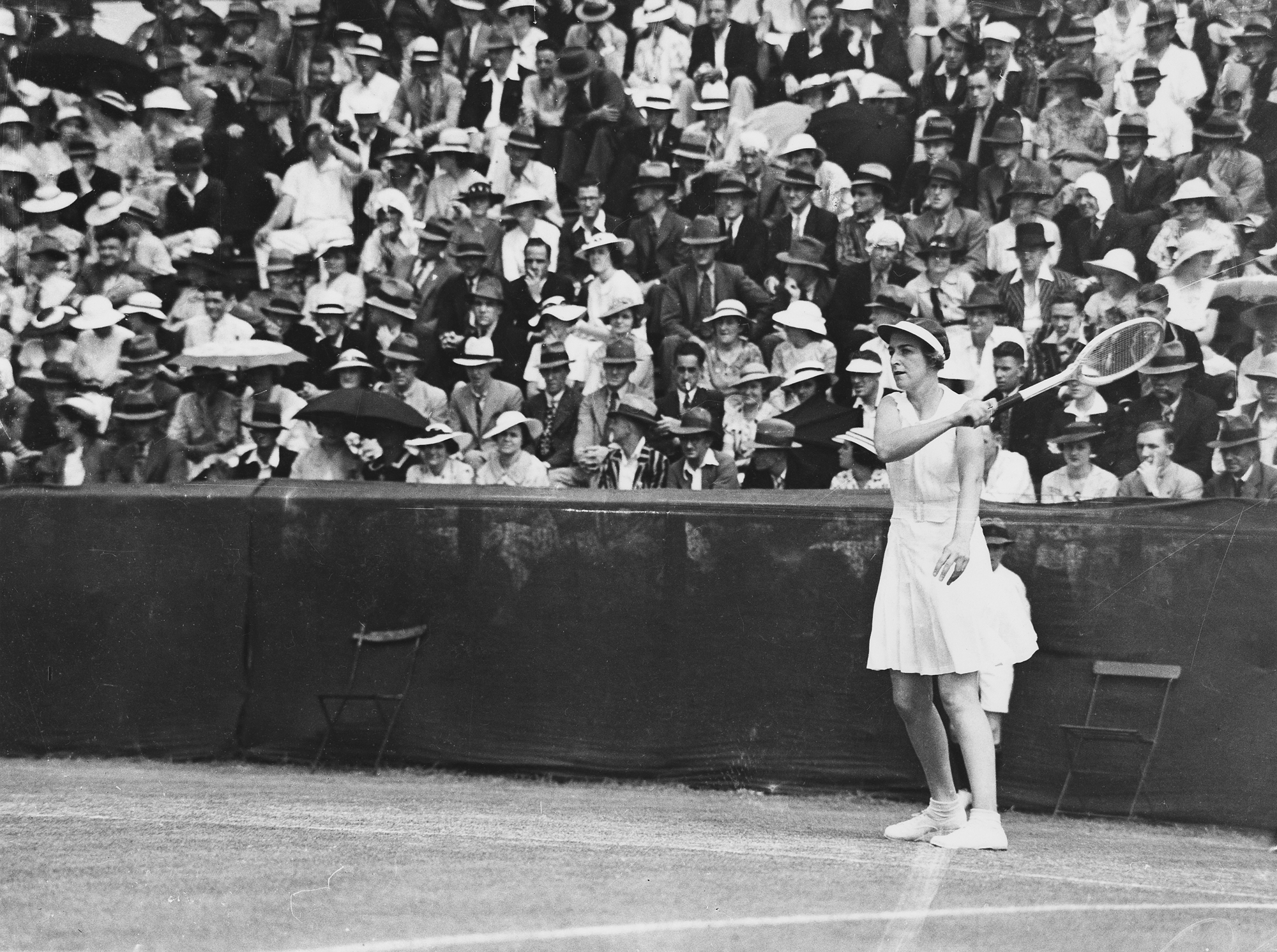
Joan Hartigan competing in a tennis tournament at Milton Courts in Brisbane, Australia in 1936

Key
W	F	SF	QF	#R	RR	Q#	DNQ	A	NH

(W) winner; (F) finalist; (SF) semifinalist; (QF) quarterfinalist; (#R) rounds 4, 3, 2, 1; (RR) round-robin stage; (Q#) qualification round; (DNQ) did not qualify; (A) absent; (NH) not held; (SR) strike rate (events won / competed); (W–L) win–loss record.

Tournament	1931	1932	1933	1934	1935	1936	1937	1938	1939	1940	1941 – 1944	1945	1946^{1}	1947^{1}	1948	1949	Career SR
Australian Championships	QF	A	W	W	A	W	QF	QF	SF	SF	NH	NH	QF	2R	A	A	3 / 10
French Championships	A	A	A	3R	A	A	A	A	A	NH	R	A	A	A	A	A	0 / 1
Wimbledon	A	A	A	SF	SF	A	A	2R	A	NH	NH	NH	A	3R	A	1R	0 / 5
U.S. Championships	A	A	A	A	A	A	A	A	A	A	A	A	A	A	A	A	0 / 0
SR	0 / 1	0 / 0	1 / 1	1 / 3	0 / 1	1 / 1	0 / 1	0 / 2	0 / 1	0 / 1	0 / 0	0 / 0	0 / 1	0 / 2	0 / 0	0 / 1	3 / 16

^{1}In 1946 and 1947, the French Championships were held after Wimbledon.

== See also ==
- Performance timelines for all female tennis players since 1978 who reached at least one Grand Slam final
