= Jack Crawford (tennis) =

Australian tennis player (1908–1991)

Jack Crawford OBE
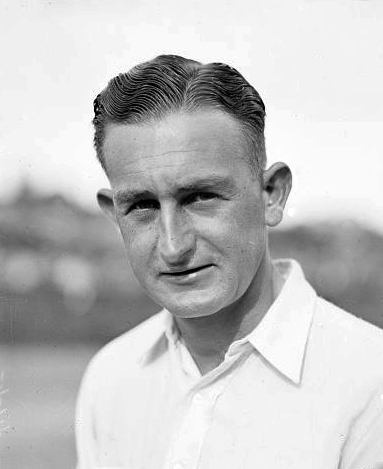
- Full name: John Herbert Crawford
- Country (sports): Australia
- Born: 22 March 1908 Urangeline, New South Wales, Australia
- Died: 10 September 1991 (aged 83) Sydney, New South Wales, Australia
- Height: 1.85 m (6 ft 1 in)
- Turned pro: 1926 (amateur tour)
- Retired: 1951
- Plays: Right-handed (one-handed backhand)
- Int. Tennis HoF: 1979 (member page)

Singles
- Career record: 681-182 (78.9%)
- Career titles: 66
- Highest ranking: No. 1 (1933, A. Wallis Myers)

Grand Slam singles results
- Australian Open: W (1931, 1932, 1933, 1935)
- French Open: W (1933)
- Wimbledon: W (1933)
- US Open: F (1933)

Doubles

Grand Slam doubles results
- Australian Open: W (1929, 1930, 1932, 1935)
- French Open: W (1935)
- Wimbledon: W (1935)
- US Open: F (1939)

Grand Slam mixed doubles results
- Australian Open: W (1931, 1932, 1933)
- French Open: W (1933)
- Wimbledon: W (1935)

John Herbert Crawford, OBE (22 March 1908 – 10 September 1991) was an Australian tennis player during the 1930s. He was the World No. 1 amateur for 1933, during which year he won the Australian Open, the French Open, and Wimbledon, and was runner-up at the U.S. Open in five sets, thus missing the Grand Slam by one set that year. He also won the Australian Open in 1931, 1932, and 1935. He was inducted into the International Tennis Hall of Fame in 1979.

== Early life ==
Crawford was born on 22 March 1908 in Urangeline, near Albury, New South Wales, the second youngest child of Jack Sr. and Lottie Crawford. He had no tennis training as a child and practised mainly by hitting against the house and school and playing his older brother. Crawford played his first competition match at age 12 in a mixed doubles match at the Haberfield club. He won the Australian junior championships four consecutive times from 1926 to 1929 which entitled him to the permanent possession of the trophy.

== Career ==
Although he won a number of major championship titles he is perhaps best known for something he did not do – complete the tennis Grand Slam in 1933, five years before Don Budge accomplished the feat for the first time in 1938.

In 1933, Crawford won the Australian Championships, French Championships, and Wimbledon Championships, leaving him needing to win the U.S. Championships to complete the Grand Slam. An asthmatic who suffered in the muggy summer heat of Forest Hills, Crawford was leading the Englishman Fred Perry in the final of the US Championships by two sets to one when his strength began to fade. It was said that Crawford was an asthmatic who frequently took brandy mixed with sugar to help his breathing during matches, and on the muggy afternoon in Forest Hills he was said to have downed two or three doses of the concoction, though there are differing accounts of what Crawford actually drank. Crawford ended up losing the match by the final score of 3–6, 13–11, 6–4, 0–6, 1–6.

Crawford was ranked World No. 1 amateur in 1933 by A. Wallis Myers, Bernard Brown, Pierre Gillou, Didier Poulain, John R. Tunis (The Literary Digest), Harry Hopman (Melbourne Herald), Alfred Chave (Brisbane Telegraph), "Set" (The West Australian) and Ellsworth Vines.

Crawford exacted some measure of revenge against Perry at the 1935 Australian, winning the final against Perry in four sets. Historically, he was competing in his tenth straight major final, a record matched only by Big Bill Tilden and then joined by Roger Federer. He advanced to his last Australian finals in 1936 and 1940, felled each time by fellow Aussie Adrian Quist, but he had set a record by making seven Australian finals appearances, equaled only by Roy Emerson in 1967.

In his 1979 autobiography Jack Kramer, the long-time tennis promoter and great player himself, included Crawford in his list of the 21 greatest players of all time.

Crawford was inducted into the International Tennis Hall of Fame in Newport, Rhode Island in 1979 and into the Australian Tennis Hall of Fame in 1997. He was made an Officer of the Order of the British Empire (OBE) in the 1977 New Year Honours for his services to sport.

== Playing style ==
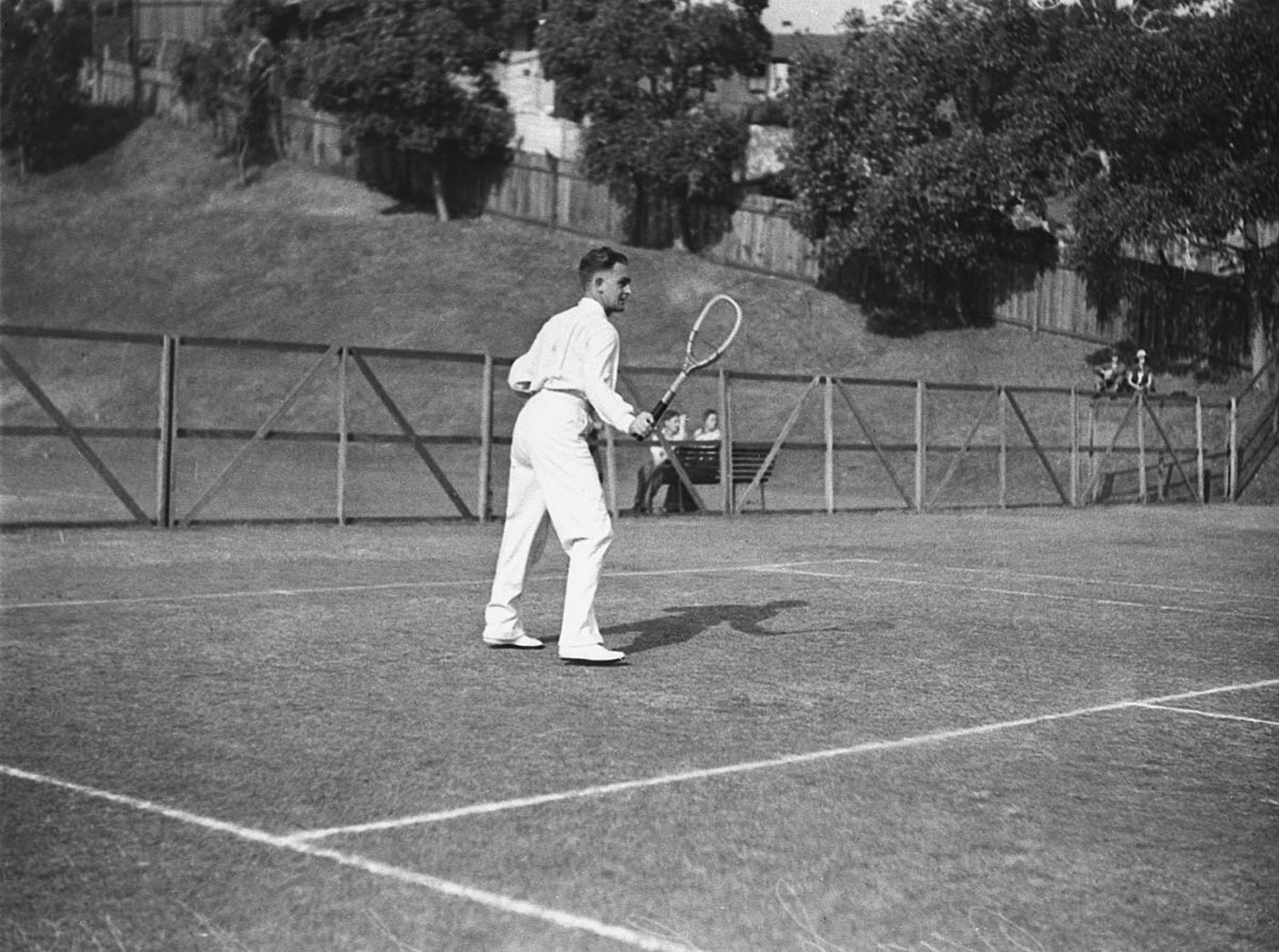
Crawford at White City, Sydney ca. 1929

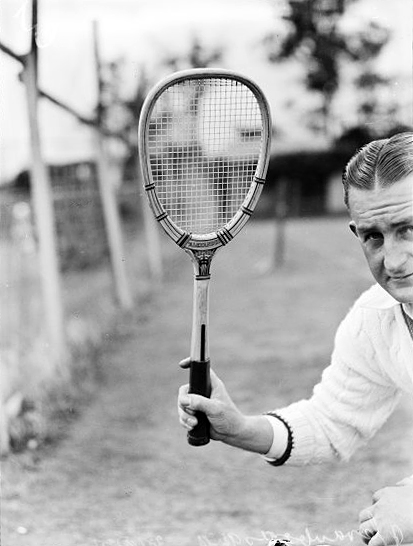
Crawford in 1933 holding his characteristic Alexander 'Cressy Wizard' flat-topped racket

Crawford was a right-handed baseline player with a game that was based more on technical skills and accuracy than on power. He was not particularly fast but had excellent anticipation and his game was described as fluent and effortless. His style was compared with Henri Cochet. Crawford always wore long, white pressed flannels and a long-sleeved shirt. He played with an old-fashioned flat-topped racket produced by the Alexander Patent Racket Company in Launceston, Tasmania.

== Grand Slam tournament finals ==
=== Singles: 12 (6 titles, 6 runners-up) ===
Result	Year	Championship	Surface	Opponent	Score
Win	1931	Australian Championships	Grass	(Australia) Harry Hopman	6–4, 6–2, 2–6, 6–1
Win	1932	Australian Championships	Grass	(Australia) Harry Hopman	4–6, 6–3, 3–6, 6–3, 6–1
Win	1933	Australian Championships	Grass	(United States) Keith Gledhill	2–6, 7–5, 6–3, 6–2
Win	1933	French Championships	Clay	(France) Henri Cochet	8–6, 6–1, 6–3
Win	1933	Wimbledon Championships	Grass	(United States) Ellsworth Vines	4–6, 11–9, 6–2, 2–6, 6–4
Loss	1933	U.S. Championships	Grass	(United Kingdom) Fred Perry	3–6, 13–11, 6–4, 0–6, 1–6
Loss	1934	Australian Championships	Grass	(United Kingdom) Fred Perry	3–6, 5–7, 1–6
Loss	1934	French Championships	Clay	(Germany) Gottfried von Cramm	4–6, 9–7, 6–3, 5–7, 3–6
Loss	1934	Wimbledon Championships	Grass	(United Kingdom) Fred Perry	3–6, 0–6, 5–7
Win	1935	Australian Championships	Grass	(United Kingdom) Fred Perry	2–6, 6–4, 6–4, 6–4
Loss	1936	Australian Championships	Grass	(Australia) Adrian Quist	2–6, 3–6, 6–4, 6–3, 7–9
Loss	1940	Australian Championships	Grass	(Australia) Adrian Quist	3–6, 1–6, 2–6

=== Doubles: 12 (6 titles, 6 runners-up) ===
Result	Year	Championship	Surface	Partner	Opponents	Score
Win	1929	Australian Championships	Grass	(Australia) Harry Hopman	(Australia) Jack Cummings (Australia) Edgar Moon	6–1, 6–8, 4–6, 6–1, 6–3
Win	1930	Australian Championships	Grass	(Australia) Harry Hopman	(Australia) Tim Fitchett (Australia) John Hawkes	8–6, 6–1, 2–6, 6–3
Loss	1931	Australian Championships	Grass	(Australia) Harry Hopman	(Australia) James Anderson (Australia) Norman Brookes	2–6, 4–6, 3–6
Win	1932	Australian Championships	Grass	(Australia) Edgar Moon	(Australia) Harry Hopman (Australia) Gerald Patterson	12–10, 6–3, 4–6, 6–4
Loss	1933	Australian Championships	Grass	(Australia) Edgar Moon	(United States) Keith Gledhill (United States) Ellsworth Vines	4–6, 8–10, 2–6
Loss	1934	French Championships	Grass	(Australia) Vivian McGrath	(France) Jean Borotra (France) Jacques Brugnon	9–11, 3–6, 6–2, 6–4, 7–9
Win	1935	Australian Championships	Grass	(Australia) Vivian McGrath	(United Kingdom) Patrick Hughes (United Kingdom) Fred Perry	6–4, 8–6, 6–2
Win	1935	French Championships	Clay	(Australia) Adrian Quist	(Australia) Donald Turnbull (Australia) Vivian McGrath	6–1, 6–4, 6–2
Win	1935	Wimbledon Championships	Grass	(Australia) Adrian Quist	(United States) Wilmer Allison (United States) John Van Ryn	6–3, 5–7, 6–2, 5–7, 7–5
Loss	1936	Australian Championships	Grass	(Australia) Vivian McGrath	(Australia) Adrian Quist (Australia) Donald Turnbull	8–6, 2–6, 1–6, 6–3, 2–6
Loss	1939	U.S. Championships	Grass	(Australia) Harry Hopman	(Australia) Adrian Quist (Australia) John Bromwich	6–8, 1–6, 4–6
Loss	1940	Australian Championships	Grass	(Australia) Vivian McGrath	(Australia) John Bromwich (Australia) Adrian Quist	3–5, 5–7, 1–6

=== Mixed doubles: 8 (5 titles, 3 runners-up) ===
Result	Year	Championship	Surface	Partner	Opponents	Score
Loss	1928	Wimbledon Championships	Grass	(Australia) Daphne Akhurst	(United States) Elizabeth Ryan (South Africa) Patrick Spence	5–7, 4–6
Loss	1929	Australian Championships	Grass	(Australia) Marjorie Cox Crawford	(Australia) Daphne Akhurst (Australia) Edgar Moon	6–0, 7–5
Loss	1930	Australian Championships	Grass	(Australia) Marjorie Cox Crawford	(Australia) Nell Hall Hopman (Australia) Harry Hopman	9–11, 6–3, 3–6
Win	1930	Wimbledon Championships	Grass	(United States) Elizabeth Ryan	(Germany) Hilde Sperling (Germany) Daniel Prenn	6–1, 6–3
Win	1931	Australian Championships	Grass	(Australia) Marjorie Cox Crawford	(Australia) Emily Hood Westacott (Australia) Aubrey Willard	7–5, 6–4
Win	1932	Australian Championships	Grass	(Australia) Marjorie Cox Crawford	(Australia) Nell Hall Hopman (Japan) Jiro Sato	6–8, 8–6, 6–3
Win	1933	Australian Championships	Grass	(Australia) Marjorie Cox Crawford	(United States) Marjorie Gladman (United States) Ellsworth Vines	3–6, 7–5, 13–11
Win	1933	French Championships	Clay	(United Kingdom) Margaret Scriven	(United Kingdom) Betty Nuthall (United Kingdom) Fred Perry	6–2, 6–3

== Grand Slam singles performance timeline ==
Key
W	F	SF	QF	#R	RR	Q#	DNQ	A	NH

(W) winner; (F) finalist; (SF) semifinalist; (QF) quarterfinalist; (#R) rounds 4, 3, 2, 1; (RR) round-robin stage; (Q#) qualification round; (DNQ) did not qualify; (A) absent; (NH) not held; (SR) strike rate (events won / competed); (W–L) win–loss record.

Tournament	1926	1927	1928	1929	1930	1931	1932	1933	1934	1935	1936	1937	1938	1939	1940	1941	1942	1943	1944	1945	1946	1947	1948	1949	1950	1951	SR	W–L	Win %
Australia	1R	QF	SF	QF	SF	W	W	W	F	W	F	SF	3R	SF	F	NH	NH	NH	NH	NH	3R	1R	3R	3R	2R	1R	4 / 21	52–17	75.4
France	A	A	QF	A	2R	A	A	W	F	SF	A	A	A	A	NH	NH	NH	NH	NH	NH	A	3R	A	A	A	A	1 / 6	20–5	80.0
Wimbledon	A	A	4R	A	3R	A	SF	W	F	SF	QF	QF	A	A	NH	NH	NH	NH	NH	NH	A	1R	A	A	A	A	1 / 9	36–8	81.8
United States	A	A	QF	A	A	A	A	F	A	A	A	A	A	3R	A	A	A	A	A	A	A	3R	A	A	A	A	0 / 4	10–4	71.4
Win–loss	0–1	2–1	12–4	2–1	6–3	5–0	10–1	23–1	15–3	14–2	8–2	7–2	1–1	5–2	4–1	0–0	0–0	0–0	0–0	0–0	1–1	1–4	1–1	1–1	0–1	0–1	6 / 40	118–34	77.6

== See also ==
- List of male tennis players a detailed list of tennis greats throughout the years
- Tennis records of All Time – Men's singles

== Sources ==
- Kendall, Allan (1995). Australia's Wimbledon Champions. Sydney, NSW: ABC Books for the Australian Broadcasting Corp. ISBN 9780733304101.
