= 1907 in tennis =

This page covers all the important events in the sport of tennis in 1907. It provides the results of notable tournaments throughout the year on both the men's and women's ILTF tennis circuits.

== Australian Open ==
| Category | Champion(s) | Finalist(s) | Score |
|---|---|---|---|
| Singles | (Australia) Horace Rice | (New Zealand) Harry Parker | 6–3, 6–4, 6–4 |
| Doubles | (Australia) William Gregg (New Zealand) Harry Parker | (Australia) Horace Rice (Australia) George Wright | 6–2, 3–6, 6–2, 6–2 |

== French Open ==
Not a Grand Slam event.

== Wimbledon ==
| Category | Champion(s) | Finalist(s) | Score |
|---|---|---|---|
| Men's singles | (Australia) Norman Brookes | (United Kingdom of Great Britain and Ireland) Arthur Gore | 6–4, 6–2, 6–2 |
| Women's singles | (United States) May Sutton | (United Kingdom of Great Britain and Ireland) Dorothea Lambert Chambers | 6–1, 6–4 |
| Men's doubles | (Australia) Norman Brookes (New Zealand) Anthony Wilding | (United States) Karl Behr (United States) Beals Wright | 6–4, 6–4, 6–2 |

== US Open ==
| Category | Champion(s) | Finalist(s) | Score |
|---|---|---|---|
| Men's singles | (United States) William Larned | (United States) Robert LeRoy | 6–2, 6–2, 6–4 |
| Women's singles | (United States) Evelyn Sears | (United States) Carrie Neely | 6–3, 6-2 |
| Men's doubles | (United States) Fred Alexander (United States) Harold Hackett | (United States) Nat Thornton (United States) Bryan M. Grant | 6–2, 6–1, 6–1 |
| Women's doubles | (United States) Marie Wimer (United States) Carrie Neely | (United States) Edna Wildey (United States) Natalie Wildey | 6–1, 2–6, 6–4 |
| Mixed doubles | (United States) May Sayers (United States) Wallace F. Johnson | (United States) Natalie Widley (United States) Herbert M. Tilden | 6–1, 7–5 |
