= Queensland Open =

Defunct tennis tournament
- Event name: Queensland Open
- Tour: Pre open era (1888–1967); Grand Prix circuit (1970–92); WTA Tour (1973–94)
- Founded: 1888
- Abolished: 1994
- Editions: 91
- Location: Brisbane, Australia
- Surface: Grass / outdoor Hard / indoor

The Queensland Open, originally called the Queensland Championships, and also known as the Queensland Lawn Tennis Championships, Queensland Grass Court Championships and the Queensland State Championships, was a tennis tournament played in Brisbane, Australia, from 1888 to 1994. The event was part of the Grand Prix tennis circuit and WTA Tour and was played originally on outdoor grass courts then outdoor and indoor hard courts.

== History ==
The Queensland State Championships were played on grass until 1969. The Queensland Open continued on grass courts until 1982 between 1987 and 1988 it switched to indoor hard courts from 1989 to 1991 it was then played on outdoor hard courts before returning to indoor hard courts until the tournament ceased. The tournament was hosted at various venues over the course of its history first at the Toowong Sports Ground (1888, 1891–1893), the Breakfast Creek Sports Ground (1889–1890), the Brisbane Exhibition Grounds (1894–1896), the Woolloongabba Cricket Ground Cricket (1897,99 1900–04, 1907–08), the Auchenflower Ground (1904–1915) before settling in a permanent base at the Milton Courts tennis centre from (1919–1994). The tournament featured men's and women's singles and doubles competition as well as mixed doubles events the tournament survived for a period of 106 years, the tennis center was closed in 1997 due to heavy financial losses by Tennis Queensland.

== Finals ==
=== Men's singles ===
- Notes: * The 1923 edition of the men's singles event was combined with the 1923 Australasian Championships.

Year	Champions	Runners-up	Score
1888	(Australia) Arthur. R. Taylor	(Australia) H. De Winton	12–4
1889	(Australia) E. P. Hudson	(Australia) A. R. Taylor	3–6, 8–6, 6–4, 3–6, 6–2
1890	(Australia) A. R. Taylor	(Australia) E. P. Hudson	6–3, 6–4, 6–0
1891	(Australia) A. R. Taylor	(Australia) Peter B. Mc Gregor	6–3, 6–4, 4–6, 5–6, 6–2
1892	(Australia) Peter B. Mc Gregor	(Australia) John E. Gilligan	8–10, 6–4, 6–3, 6–4
1893	(Australia) Ernest Hutton	(Australia) J. Ernest Gilligan	6–1, 6–4, 6–3
1894	(Australia) John E. Gilligan	(Australia) Russell R. Love	6–1, 6–3, 5–7, 6–2
1895	(Australia) Samuel H. Hughes	(Australia) John E. Gilligan	6–2, 6–2, 8–6
1896	(Australia) Albert Curtis	(Australia) Samuel H. Hughes	4–6, 6–2, 6–8, 6–2, 6–3
1897	(Australia) F. A. Waller	(Australia) Ernest L. Newman	6–1, 4–6, 6–1, 4–6, 6–3
1898	(Australia) Eric Pockley	(Australia) F. A. Waller	7–5, 6–4, 6–3
1899	(Australia) Les Poidevin	(Australia) Ernest L. Newman	6–3, 6–0, 6–2
1900	(Australia) Les Poidevin	(Australia) H.B. Rowlands	6–2, 3–6, 6–2, 6–2
1901	(Australia) Horace Rice	(Australia) Edward R. Crouch	6–1, 6–1, 6–0
1902	(Australia) H.B. Rowlands	(Australia) Edwin W. Fowles	6–4, 4–6, 7–5, 6–2
1903	(Australia) John N. Griffiths	(Australia) George S. Crouch	8–6, 6–1, 6–2
1904	(Australia) Stanley Doust	(Australia) Gordon W. Wright	walkover
1905	(Australia) Stanley Doust	(Australia) Henry M.Marsh	3–6, 8–6, 6–4, 3–6, 6–2
1906	(Australia) Harry Parker	(Australia) Stanley Doust	6–3, 6–2, 6–1
1907	(Australia) Horace Rice	(Australia) Harry Parker	?
1909	(Australia) Harry Parker	(Australia) Stanley Doust	6–2, 3–6, 6–3, 6–2
1909	(Australia) Macauley Turner	(Australia) Bert St. John	6–4, 7–5, 6–3
1910	(Australia) Harry Parker	(Australia) Macauley Turner	6–2, 6–1, 6–1
1911	(Australia) Horace Rice	(Australia) Harry Parker	4–6, 9–7, 6–2, 6–1
1912	(Australia) Horace Rice	(Australia) Alfred Jones	6–1, 6–1, 6–3
1913	(Australia) Lindsay D. Todd	(Australia) Clarence Todd	walkover
1914	(Australia) Clarence Todd	(Australia) T. W. Clark	7–5, 4–6, 6–1, 6–4
1915	(United Kingdom) Gordon Lowe	(Australia) Horace Rice	4–6, 6–1, 6–1, 6–4
1916–18	Not held (due to world war one)		
1919	(Australia) Bert St. John	(Australia) Horace Rice	5–7, 7–5, 7–5, 7–5
1920	(Australia) Bert St. John	(Australia) Edward Jordan	2–6, 6–1, 6–3, 9–7
1921	(Australia) Jack N. Radcliffe	(Australia) Edward Jordan	10–8, 6–4, 6–1
1922	(Australia) Horace Rice	(Australia) R. G. Spencer	6–8 6–4, 6–4, 6–1
1923	(Australia) Pat O'Hara Wood	(Australia) Bert St. John	6–1, 6–1, 6–3 *
1924	(Australia) Jack Cummings	(Australia) Edgar Moon	6–4, 2–6, 6–2, 6–4
1925	(Australia) Pat O'Hara Wood	(Australia) Jack Cummings	6–3, 2–6, 5–7, 6–4, 6–2
1926	(Australia) Jack Cummings	(Australia) Edgar Moon	3–6, 6–3, 6–0, 6–0
1927	(Australia) Jack Crawford	(Australia) Frederick Kalms	9–7, 3–6, 6–3, 6–4
1928	(Australia) James Willard	(United States) Richard Schlesinger	6–1, 6–4, 3–6, 6–3
1929	(Australia) Jack Crawford	(Australia) Edgar Moon	6–1, 8–6, 6–1
1930	(Australia) Jack Cummings	(Australia) Roy Dunlop	6–0, 6–2, 6–2
1931	(Australia) Jack Crawford	(Australia) Harry Hopman	6–4, 6–4,7–5
1932	(Australia) Edgar Moon	(Australia) Vivian McGrath	7–5, 6–3, 6–2
1933	(Australia) Adrian Quist	(Australia) Jack Crawford	6–2, 2–6, 4–6, 12–10, 6–3
1934	(Australia) Jack Crawford	(Australia) Adrian Quist	6–2, 6–4, 4–6, 4–6, 9–7
1935	(Australia) John Bromwich	(Australia) George Tait	6–1, 6–3, 6–0
1936	(Australia) Vivian McGrath	(Australia) John Bromwich	6–2, 7–5, 6–2
1937	(Australia) John Bromwich	(Australia) Vivian McGrath	6–2, 6–2, 6–2
1938	(Australia) John Bromwich	(Australia) James Gilchrist	4–6, 6–1, 6–1, 4–6, 6–3
1939	(Australia) John Bromwich	(Australia) James Gilchrist	6–1, 6–2, 6–3
1940	(Australia) Adrian Quist	(Australia) Jack Crawford	6–4, 8–6, 7–5
1941	(Australia) John Bromwich	(Australia) Jack Crawford	6–4, 6–8, 4–6, 6–4, 6–3
1942–45	Not held (due to world war two)		
1946	(Australia) Bill Sidwell	(Australia) Lionel Brodie	7–9, 4–6, 6–2, 6–3, 6–0
1947	(Australia) Adrian Quist	(Australia) James Gilchrist	6–4, 6–4, 6–4
1948	(Australia) Adrian Quist	(Australia) George Worthington	6–3, 6–0, 6–4
1949	(Australia) Geoff Brown	(Australia) Bill Sidwell	8–6, 6–1, 6–2
1950	(Australia) Frank Sedgman	(United States) Art Larsen	6–2, 6–4, 6–2
1951	(Australia) Frank Sedgman	(Australia) Ian Ayre	6–2, 6–1, 6–2
1952	(Australia) Frank Sedgman	(Australia) Mervyn Rose	11–9, 6–2, 0–6, 2–6, 6–1
1953	(Australia) Lew Hoad	(Australia) Rex Hartwig	6–4, 6–1, 6–2
1954	(Australia) Lew Hoad	(Australia) Rex Hartwig	6–4, 6–4, 0–6, 0–6, 6–1
1955	(Australia) Ken Rosewall	(Australia) Ashley Cooper	6–8, 6–4, 6–4, 6–4
1956	(Australia) Ashley Cooper	(Australia) Lew Hoad	5–7, 7–5, 6–2, 4–6, 6–4
1957	(Australia) Roy Emerson	(Australia) Neale Fraser	6–3, 6–2, 6–2
1958	(Australia) Ashley Cooper	(Australia) Mal Anderson	6–3, 1–6, 6–1, 6–4
1959	(Australia) Roy Emerson	(Australia) Neale Fraser	6–1, 6–2, 1–6, 6–3
1960	(Australia) Roy Emerson	(South Africa) Bob Hewitt	14–12, 6–0, 6–3
1961	(Australia) Rod Laver	(Australia) Roy Emerson	4–6, 4–6, 6–0, 8–6, 6–3
1962	(South Africa) Bob Hewitt	(Australia) Rod Laver	1–6, 6–3, 6–4, 1–6, 7–5
1963	(Australia) Roy Emerson	(Australia) Fred Stolle	6–3, 5–7, 6–4, 4–6, 6–1
1964	(Australia) Fred Stolle	(Australia) Roy Emerson	6–3, 8–6, 3–6, 4–6, 7–5
1965	(United States) Arthur Ashe	(Australia) Roy Emerson	3–6, 6–2, 6–3, 3–6, 6–1
1966	(Australia) Roy Emerson	(Australia) Fred Stolle	4–6, 6–3, 6–4, 3–6, 6–2
1967	(Australia) Roy Emerson	(Australia) John Newcombe	9–7, 3–6, 6–4, 4–6, 7–5
1968	(United States) Arthur Ashe	(United States) Stan Smith	6–4, 1–6, 9–7, 4–6, 7–5
1969	(Australia) Ray Ruffels	(Australia) Allan Stone	8–6, 4–6, 6–3, 6–3
↓ Open era ↓
1970	(Australia) Bob Giltinan	(Australia) Ross Case	6–3, 6–0, 2–6, 6–2
1971	(Australia) Mal Anderson	(Australia) John Cooper	6–4, 6–4, 6–7, 7–6
1972	(Australia) Ken Rosewall	(Australia) Geoff Masters	6–2, 5–7, 6–4, 3–6, 7–5
1973	(Australia) Syd Ball	(Australia) Ross Case	4–6, 6–4, 6–1, 2–6, 6–1
1974	(Australia) Bob Giltinan	(West Germany) Ulrich Marten	6–3, 7–6
1975	(Australia) Mal Anderson	(Australia) Mark Edmondson	3–6, 6–3, 6–4, 6–4
1976	(Australia) Mal Anderson	(United States) Tim Wilkison	6–4, 6–2, 3–6, 6–4
1977	(Australia) Keith Hancock	(Australia) Jeff Twist	7–6, 7–6, 7–6
1978	(Australia) Dale Collings	(Australia) Victor Eke	7–6, 6–4, 6–4
1979	(Australia) Dale Collings	(Australia) Chris Kachel	7–6, 6–7, 6–3, 3–6, 10–8
1980	(United States) Mike Estep	(Australia) John Fitzgerald	6–3, 3–6, 6–4
1981	(Australia) Chris Johnstone	(Australia) Phil Dent	6–4, 6–4
1982	(Australia) Charlie Fancutt	(Australia) Pat Cash	7–6, 6–3
1984–86	Not held		
1987	(New Zealand) Kelly Evernden	(Germany) Eric Jelen	3–6, 6–1, 6–1
1988	(United States) Tim Mayotte	(United States) Marty Davis	6–4, 6–4
1989	(Sweden) Niclas Kroon	(Australia) Mark Woodforde	4–6, 6–2, 6–4
1990	(United States) Brad Gilbert	(United States) Aaron Krickstein	6–3, 6–1
1991	(Italy) Gianluca Pozzi	(United States) Aaron Krickstein	6–3, 7–6
1992	(France) Guillaume Raoux	(Denmark) Kenneth Carlsen	6–4, 7–6

=== Men's doubles ===
Year	Champions	Runners-up	Score
1987	(United States) Matt Anger (New Zealand) Kelly Evernden	(Australia) Broderick Dyke (Australia) Wally Masur	7–6, 6–2
1988	(Germany) Eric Jelen (Germany) Carl-Uwe Steeb	(Canada) Grant Connell (Canada) Glenn Michibata	6–4, 6–1
1989	(Australia) Darren Cahill (Australia) Mark Kratzmann	(Australia) Broderick Dyke (Australia) Simon Youl	6–4, 5–7, 6–0
1990	(Australia) Jason Stoltenberg (Australia) Todd Woodbridge	(United States) Brian Garrow (Australia) Mark Woodforde	2–6, 6–4, 6–4
1991	(Australia) Todd Woodbridge (Australia) Mark Woodforde	(Australia) John Fitzgerald (Canada) Glenn Michibata	7–6, 6–3
1992	(United States) Steve DeVries (Australia) David Macpherson	(United States) Patrick McEnroe (United States) Jonathan Stark	6–4, 6–4

=== Women's singles ===
- Notes: * The 1923 edition of the women's singles event was combined with the 1923 Australasian Championships.

Year	Champions	Runners-up	Score
Queensland Association Tournament
1888	(Australia) Miss Earle	(Australia) Mrs. Gilligan	12–9
Queensland Championships
1889	(Australia) May Davis Quinnel	(Australia) Miss Earle	6–1, 6–0
1890	(Australia) May Davis Quinnel	(Australia) Miss Earle	6–2, 6–4
1891	(Australia) Miss Lee	(Australia) May Davis Quinnel	7–5, 6–2
1892	(Australia) Miss McGregor	(Australia) Mabel Taylor	6–3, 6–2
1893	(Australia) Mabel Taylor	(Australia) Miss Wallace	6–3, 6–2
1894	(Australia) Mary Pugh	(Australia) Mabel Taylor	6–2, 6–3
1895	(Australia) Amy Pratten	(Australia) Mary Pugh	6–4, 5–7, 7–5
1896	(Australia) Ethel Mant	(Australia) Amy Pratten	6–2, 6–1
1897	(Australia) Ethel Mant	(Australia) Eileen Persse	6–3, 5–7, 6–?
1898	(Australia) Ethel Mant	(Australia) Amy Pratten	6–1, 7–9, 6–1
1899	(Australia) Ethel Mant	(Australia) Mabel Mant	6–3, 6–3
1900	(Australia) Ethel Mant	(Australia) M.Dransfield	6–8, 6–1, 6–1
1901	(Australia) Mabel Mant	(Australia) Amy Pratten	6–1, 6–2
1902	(Australia) Mabel Mant	(Australia) Ethel Mant	6–3, 6–1
1903	(Australia) Ethel Mant	(Australia) Mabel Mant	7–5, 2–6, 6–2
1904	(Australia) Rose Payten	(Australia) Ethel Mant	6–0, 6–0
1905	(Australia) Rose Payten	(Australia) Ethel Mant	7–5, 6–3
1906	(Australia) Ethel Mant	(Australia) Mabel Mant	6–4, 6–3
1907	(Australia) Rose Payten	(Australia) Ethel Mant	6–1, 6–1
1908	(Australia) Annie Baker	(Australia) Miss Thomas	6–2, 6–2
1909	(Australia) Annie Baker	(Australia) Dute MacKintosh	6–0, 6–0
1910	(Australia) Dute MacKintosh	(Australia) May Thurlow	6–1, 6–4
1911	(Australia) Annie Baker Ford	(Australia) Dute MacKintosh	6–3, 6–1
1912	(Australia) Annie Baker Ford	(Australia) Orea Moustaka Beatty	(final postponed and played in Sydney)
1913	(Australia) Beryl Spowers	(Australia) Dorothy Dight	6–0, 6–8, 6–0
1914	(Australia) Beryl Spowers	(Australia) Floris St George	6–2, 6–4
1915	(Australia) Beryl Spowers	(Australia) Mall Mutch	2–6, 6–1, 6–2
1916	No competition (due to World War I)		
1917	No competition (due to World War I)		
1918	(Australia) Beryl Spowers Turner	(Australia) Miss Campbell	7–5 6–3
1919	(Australia) Annie Baker Ford	(Australia) Nellie Halley	6–1, 6–4
1920	(Australia) Annie Baker Ford	(Australia) Beryl Spowers Turner	6–0, 6–2
1921	(Australia) Annie Gray	(Australia) Nell Lloyd	2–6, 6–2, 9–7
1922	(Australia) Margaret Molesworth	(Australia) Beryl Spowers Turner	6–3, 6–2
1923	(Australia) Margaret Molesworth	(Australia) Esna Boyd	6–1, 7–5 *
1924	(Australia) Margaret Molesworth	(Australia) Beryl Spowers Turner	6–4, 8–6
1925	(Australia) Meryl O'Hara Wood	(Australia) Beryl Spowers Turner	3–6, 6–2, 6–2
1926	(Australia) Beryl Spowers Turner	(Australia) Meryl O'Hara Wood	6–3, 6–1
1927	(Australia) Margaret Molesworth	(Australia) Marjorie Cox	6–4, 9–7
1928	(Australia) Marjorie Cox	(Australia) Margaret Molesworth	6–3, 6–3
1929	(Australia) Margaret Molesworth	(Australia) Emily Hood	6–3, 6–1
1930	(Australia) Margaret Molesworth	(Australia) Emily Hood	7–5, 6–4
1931	(Australia) Margaret Molesworth	(Australia) Emily Hood Westacott	6–1, 6–3
1932	(Australia) Emily Hood Westacott	(Australia) Margaret Molesworth	4–6, 6–4, 6–1
1933	(Australia) Margaret Molesworth	(Australia) Marjorie Cox Crawford	6–2, 6–2
1934	(Australia) Emily Hood Westacott	(Australia) Joan Hartigan	9–7, 6–0
1935	(Australia) May Hardcastle	(Australia) Flo Francisco	6–2, 6–2
1936	(Australia) Nancye Wynne	(Australia) Joan Hartigan	7–5, 6–1
1937	(Australia) May Hardcastle	(Australia) Emily Hood Westacott	6–0, 2–6, 6–0
1938	(Australia) Emily Hood Westacott	(Australia) May Hardcastle	6–2, 6–4
1939	(Australia) May Hardcastle	(Australia) Thelma Coyne	6–3, 6–0
1940	(Australia) May Hardcastle	(Australia) Emily Hood Westacott	4–6, 6–2, 6–2
1941–45	Not held (due to world war two)		
1946	(Australia) Pat Jones	(Australia) May Hardcastle	6–3, 6–2
1947	(Australia) Thelma Coyne Long	(Australia) Pat Jones	6–2, 6–2
1948	(United States) Lavina Singleton Mills	(Australia) Heather Hargraves	6–2, 9–7
1949	(Australia) Lavina Singleton Mills	(Australia) Edie Niemeyer Finney	6–2, 6–1
1950	(Australia) Lavina Singleton Mills	(Australia) Jill Ritchie	6–0, 6–3
1951	(Australia) Lavina Singleton Mills	(Australia) Edie Niemeyer Finney	1–6, 6–3, 6–2
1952	(Australia) Lavina Singleton Mills	(United States) Mary Schultz	6–0, 4–6, 6–2
1953	(Australia) Fay Muller	(Australia) Daphne Seeney	3–6, 6–4, 6–2
1954	(Australia) Thelma Long	(Australia) Mary Carter	6–2, 6–2
1955	(Australia) Mary Carter	(Australia) Daphne Seeney	6–2, 3–6, 6–1
1956	(Australia) Mary Carter	(Australia) Margaret Hellyer	4–6, 6–2, 7–5
1957	(United Kingdom) Angela Mortimer	(Australia) Lorraine Coghlan	7–5, 6–3
1958	(Australia) Daphne Seeney Fancutt	(South Africa) Sandra Reynolds	7–5, 6–1
1959	(Australia) Jan Lehane	(United Kingdom) Christine Truman	6–2, 6–1
1960	(Australia) Margaret Smith	(Australia) Lesley Turner	10–8, 6–1
1961	Abandoned (due to wash out in semi finals)		
1962	(Australia) Margaret Smith	(Australia) Jan Lehane	6–3, 6–4
1963	(Australia) Margaret Smith	(Australia) Lesley Turner	6–3, 6–2
1964	(Australia) Margaret Smith	(Australia) Lesley Turner	11–9, 6–1
1965	(Australia) Margaret Smith	(Australia) Lesley Turner	6–2, 6–3
1966	(Australia) Lesley Turner	(Australia) Kerry Melville	6–0, 8–6
1967	(Australia) Kerry Melville	(Australia) Lesley Turner	6–2, 6–4
↓ Open era ↓
1968	(Australia) Karen Krantzcke	(Australia) Kerry Melville	6–3, 6–4
1969	(United Kingdom) Winnie Shaw	(Australia) Karen Krantzcke	11–9, 6–4
1970	(Australia) Evonne Goolagong	(United States) Kris Kemmer	6–3, 6–2
1971	(Australia) Evonne Goolagong	(Australia) Helen Gourlay	6–2, 7–6
1972	(Australia) Evonne Goolagong	(United Kingdom) Glynis Coles	6–0, 7–5
1973	(Australia) Janet Young	(Japan) Kazuko Sawamatsu	6–1, 6–4
1974	(Australia) Evonne Goolagong	(Australia) Cynthia Doerner	6–1, 6–2
1975	(Sweden) Nina Bohm	(Australia) Nerida Gregory	6–1, 6–1
1976	(Australia) Susan Leo	(Australia) Donna Kelly	7–5, 7–6
1977	(Czechoslovakia) Regina Maršíková	(Sweden) Helena Anliot	6–1, 3–6, 6–4
1978	(United Kingdom) Sue Barker	(Australia) Chris O'Neil	6–1, 6–3
1979	(Australia) Linda Cassell	(Australia) M. Earle	6–1, 4–6, 6–1
1980	(Australia) Elizabeth Sayers	(United Kingdom) Sue Barker	6–2, 6–1
1981	(Australia) Chris O'Neil	(Australia) Kerryn Pratt	6–3. 7–5
1982	(Australia) Wendy Turnbull	(United States) Pam Shriver	6–3, 6–1
1983	(United States) Pam Shriver	(Australia) Wendy Turnbull	6–4, 7–5
1984	(Czechoslovakia) Helena Suková	(Australia) Elizabeth Sayers Smylie	6–4, 6–4
1985	(United States) Martina Navratilova	(United States) Pam Shriver	6–3, 7–5
1986	Not held (due to the change in tournament dates for the Australian season)		
1987	(Czechoslovakia) Hana Mandlíková	(United States) Pam Shriver	6–2, 6–4
1988	(United States) Pam Shriver	(Czechoslovakia) Jana Novotná	7–6, 7–6
1989	(Czechoslovakia) Helena Suková	(Netherlands) Brenda Schultz	7–6, 7–6
1990	(Soviet Union) Natasha Zvereva	(Australia) Rachel McQuillan	6–4, 6–0
1991	(Czechoslovakia) Helena Suková	(Japan) Akiko Kijimuta	6–4, 6–3
1992	(Australia) Nicole Provis	(Australia) Rachel McQuillan	6–3, 6–2
1993	(Spain) Conchita Martínez	(Bulgaria) Magdalena Maleeva	6–3, 6–4
1994	(United States) Lindsay Davenport	(Argentina) Florencia Labat	6–1, 2–6, 6–3

== Notes ==
- Ayre's Lawn Tennis Almanack and Tournament Guide, 1908 to 1938, A. Wallis Myers.
- British Lawn Tennis and Squash Magazine, 1948 to 1967, British Lawn Tennis Ltd, UK.
- Dunlop Lawn Tennis Almanack And Tournament Guide, G.P. Hughes, 1939 to 1958, Dunlop Sports Co. Ltd, UK
- Lawn tennis and Badminton Magazine, 1906 to 1973, UK.
- Lowe's Lawn Tennis Annuals and Compendia, Lowe, Sir F. Gordon, Eyre & Spottiswoode
- Spalding's Lawn Tennis Annuals from 1885 to 1922, American Sports Pub. Co, USA.
- The World of Tennis Annuals, Barrett John, 1970 to 2001.
