= 1915 in tennis =

This page covers all the important events in the sport of tennis in 1915. It provides the results of notable tournaments throughout the year on both the men's and women's ILTF tennis circuits.

== Australian Open ==
Category	Champion(s)	Finalist(s)	Score
Singles	(United Kingdom) Gordon Lowe	(Australia) Horace Rice	4–6, 6–1, 6–1, 6–4
Doubles	(Australia) Horace Rice (Australia) Clarence Todd	(United Kingdom) Gordon Lowe (Australia) Bert St John	8–6, 6–4, 7–9, 6–3

== French Open ==
Not a Grand Slam event.

== Wimbledon ==
No event.

== US Open ==
Category	Champion(s)	Finalist(s)	Score
Men's singles	(United States) William Johnston	(United States) Maurice McLoughlin	1–6, 6–0, 7–5, 10–8
Women's singles	(Norway) Molla Bjurstedt	(United States) Hazel Hotchkiss Wightman	4–6, 6–2, 6–0
Men's doubles	(United States) William Johnston (United States) Clarence Griffin	(United States) Maurice McLoughlin (United States) Tom Bundy	2–6, 6–3, 6–4, 3–6, 6–3
Women's doubles	(United States) Hazel Wightman (United States) Eleonora Sears	(United States) Helen Homans McLean (United States) G. L. Chapman	10–8, 6–2
Mixed doubles	(United States) Hazel Wightman (United States) Harry Johnson	(Norway) Molla Bjurstedt (United States) Irving Wright	6–0, 6–1
