= 1910 in tennis =

This page covers all the important events in the sport of tennis in 1910. It provides the results of notable tournaments throughout the year on both the men's and women's ILTF tennis circuits.

== Australian Open ==
Category	Champion(s)	Finalist(s)	Score
Singles	(Australia) Rodney Heath	(Australia) Horace Rice	6–4, 6–3, 6–2
Doubles	(Australia) Ashley Campbell (Australia) Horace Rice	(Australia) Rodney Heath (Australia) James O'Dea	6–3, 6–3, 6–2

== French Open ==
Not a Grand Slam event.

== Wimbledon ==
Category	Champion(s)	Finalist(s)	Score
Men's singles	(New Zealand) Anthony Wilding	(United Kingdom of Great Britain and Ireland) Arthur Gore	6–4, 7–5, 4–6, 6–2
Women's singles	(United Kingdom of Great Britain and Ireland) Dorothea Lambert Chambers	(United Kingdom of Great Britain and Ireland) Dora Boothby	6–2, 6–2
Men's doubles	(United Kingdom of Great Britain and Ireland) Major Ritchie (New Zealand) Anthony Wilding	(United Kingdom of Great Britain and Ireland) Herbert Roper Barrett (United Kingdom of Great Britain and Ireland) Arthur Gore	6–1, 6–1, 6–2

== US Open ==
Category	Champion(s)	Finalist(s)	Score
Men's singles	(United States) William Larned	(United States) Tom Bundy	6–1, 5–7, 6–0, 6–8, 6–1
Women's singles	(United States) Hazel Hotchkiss	(United States) Louise Hammond	6–4, 6–2
Men's doubles	(United States) Fred Alexander (United States) Harold Hackett	(United States) Tom Bundy (United States) Trowridge Hendrick	6–1, 8–6, 6–3
Women's doubles	(United States) Hazel Hotchkiss (United States) Edith Rotch	(United States) Adelaide Browning (United States) Edna Wildey	6–4, 6–4
Mixed doubles	(United States) Hazel Hotchkiss (United States) Joseph Carpenter, Jr.	(United States) Edna Wildey (United States) Herbert M. Tilden	6–2, 6–2
