= 1923 in tennis =

This page covers all the important events in the sport of tennis in 1923. It provides the results of notable tournaments throughout the year on both the men's and women's ILTF tennis circuits.

== Australian Open ==
Category	Champion(s)	Finalist(s)	Score
Men's singles	(Australia) Pat O'Hara Wood	(Australia) Bert St John	6–1, 6–1, 6–3
Women's singles	(Australia) Margaret Molesworth	(Australia) Esna Boyd	6–1, 7–5
Men's doubles	(Australia) Pat O'Hara Wood (Australia) Bert St. John	(Australia) Dudley Bullough (Australia) Horace Rice	6–4, 6–3, 3–6, 6–0
Women's doubles	(Australia) Esna Boyd (Australia) Sylvia Lance Harper	(Australia) Margaret Molesworth (Australia) Mrs. H. Turner	6–1, 6–4
Mixed doubles	(Australia) Sylvia Lance Harper (Australia) Horace Rice	(Australia) Margaret Molesworth (Australia) Bert St. John	2–6, 6–4, 6–4

== French Open ==
Not a Grand Slam event.

== Wimbledon ==
Category	Champion(s)	Finalist(s)	Score
Men's singles	(United States) Bill Johnston	(United States) Frank Hunter	6–0, 6–3, 6–1
Women's singles	(France) Suzanne Lenglen	(United Kingdom) Kitty McKane	6–2, 6–2
Men's doubles	(United Kingdom) Leslie Godfree (United Kingdom) Randolph Lycett	(Spain) Eduardo Flaquer (Spain) Manuel de Gomar	6–3, 6–4, 3–6, 6–3
Women's doubles	(France) Suzanne Lenglen (United States) Elizabeth Ryan	(United Kingdom) Joan Austin (United Kingdom) Evelyn Colyer	6–3, 6–1
Mixed doubles	(United Kingdom) Randolph Lycett (United States) Elizabeth Ryan	(India) Lewis Deane (United Kingdom) Dorothy Shepherd-Barron	6–4, 7–5

== US Open ==
Category	Champion(s)	Finalist(s)	Score
Men's singles	(United States) Bill Tilden	(United States) Bill Johnston	6–4, 6–1, 6–4
Women's singles	(United States) Helen Wills	(United States) Molla Mallory	6–2, 6–1
Men's doubles	(United States) Bill Tilden (South Africa) Brian Norton	(United States) Richard Norris Williams (United States) Watson Washburn	3–6, 6–2, 6–3, 5–7, 6–2
Women's doubles	(United Kingdom) Kitty McKane (United Kingdom) Phyllis Howkins Covell	(United States) Hazel Hotchkiss Wightman (United States) Eleanor Goss	2–6, 6–2, 6–1
Mixed doubles	(United States) Molla Mallory (United States) Bill Tilden	(United Kingdom) Kitty McKane (Australia) John Hawkes	6–3, 2–6, 10–8
