= 1923 in sports =

1923 in sports describes the year's events in world sport.

== American football ==
NFL championship

- Canton Bulldogs (11–0–1)

College championship

- Illinois Fighting Illini – college football national championship

== Association football ==
Bulgaria

- Formation of the Bulgarian Football Union (BFU)

England

- The Football League – Liverpool 60 points, Sunderland 54, Huddersfield Town 53, Newcastle United 48, Everton 47, Aston Villa 46
- FA Cup final – Bolton Wanderers 2–0 West Ham United at Empire Stadium, Wembley, London. The match, known as the "White Horse Final", is the inaugural Wembley final.
- The Third Division North expands from 20 to 22 clubs, bringing the total number of Football League clubs to 88. With Stalybridge Celtic expelled, the new clubs are Doncaster Rovers, New Brighton (1923–1951) and Bournemouth & Boscombe Athletic.

Germany

- National Championship – Hamburger SV 3–0 Union Oberschöneweide at Berlin

Romania

- Rapid București is founded under the name "Cultural and Sporting Association CFR" (in Romanian: Asociatia culturala si sportiva C.F.R.) by a group of workers at the Grivita workshops.

Spain

- Celta de Vigo is founded after the merger of Real Vigo Sporting and Real Club Fortuna de Vigo.
- Club Deportivo Villarreal, official founded on March 10, as predecessor for Villarreal CF.

Turkey

- Formation of the Turkish Football Federation (Türkiye Futbol Federasyonu or TFF)
- Genclerbirligi of Ankara officially founded on March 14.

== Athletics ==
Monaco

- third Women's Olympiad in Monte Carlo

UK

- First British Track & Field championships for women, London

US

- First American Track & Field championships for women, New Jersey

== Australian rules football ==
VFL Premiership

- 13 October – Essendon wins the 27th VFL Premiership, defeating Fitzroy 8.15 (63) to 6.10 (46) at Melbourne Cricket Ground (MCG) in the 1923 VFL Grand Final.^{[a]}

South Australian Football League

- 29 September – Norwood 9.12 (66) defeats North Adelaide 6.4 (40) to win its second successive SAFL premiership
- Magarey Medal won by Horrie Riley (Sturt)

West Australian Football League

- 6 October – East Perth win its fifth consecutive premiership, beating East Fremantle 9.9 (63) to 7.4 (46)
- Sandover Medal won by "Digger" Thomas (East Perth)

== Bandy ==
Sweden

- Championship final – Västerås SK 2-1 IF Linnéa

== Baseball ==
World Series

- 10–15 October — New York Yankees (AL) defeats New York Giants (NL) to win the 1923 World Series by 4 games to 2

Major League Baseball

- 18 April — opening of the original Yankee Stadium in the Bronx

Negro leagues

- The Eastern Colored League (ECL) plays its first season with six teams: Hilldale Daisies, Brooklyn Royal Giants, Cuban Stars (East), New York Lincoln Giants, Atlantic City Bacharach Giants, and Baltimore Black Sox. Hilldale wins the first pennant. Afterward the league votes for expansion to eight teams, accepting the Harrisburg Giants and the Washington Potomacs.
- The Negro National League completes its fourth season with the Kansas City Monarchs winning their first pennant after three years of domination by Rube Foster's Chicago American Giants. The other teams in the league are Indianapolis ABC's, Detroit Stars, St. Louis Stars, Cuban Stars (West), Toledo Tigers, and Milwaukee Bears. The Tigers and Bears disband during the season and three teams play under "associate" status for the remainder of the season: Cleveland Tate Stars, Birmingham Black Barons, and Memphis Red Sox.
- Oscar "Heavy" Johnson wins the NNL triple crown, leading in batting average, home runs, and RBI, while Wilbur "Bullet" Rogan leads in wins and strikeouts. Raleigh "Biz" Mackey is the batting leader in the ECL with Jesse "Nip" Winters leading in most pitching categories.
- There is no World Series between the two champions this year, owing to enmity between Rube Foster and the ECL president Ed Bolden

== Boxing ==
Events

- 18 June — Jimmy Wilde's long reign as World Flyweight Champion ends when he is knocked out by Filipino Pancho Villa in the 7th round in New York City
- 31 August — Harry Greb, arguably the greatest-ever middleweight, takes the world title when he defeats Johnny Wilson over 15 rounds in New York City
- 14 September — Jack Dempsey knocks out Luis Firpo in the second round of a sensational fight at the Polo Grounds in New York City to retain his World Heavyweight Championship title.

Lineal world champions

- World Heavyweight Championship – Jack Dempsey
- World Light Heavyweight Championship – Battling Siki → Mike McTigue
- World Middleweight Championship – Johnny Wilson → Harry Greb
- World Welterweight Championship – Mickey Walker
- World Lightweight Championship – Benny Leonard
- World Featherweight Championship – Johnny Kilbane → Eugene Criqui → Johnny Dundee
- World Bantamweight Championship – Joe Lynch
- World Flyweight Championship – Jimmy Wilde → Pancho Villa

== Canadian football ==
Grey Cup

- 11th Grey Cup in the Canadian Football League – Queen's University 54–0 Regina Roughriders

== Cricket ==
Events

- In a cool, damp English summer, a West Indian team is on tour, winning six and losing seven first-class matches.

England

- County Championship – Yorkshire
- Minor Counties Championship – Buckinghamshire
- Most runs – Patsy Hendren 2934 @ 77.21 (HS 200*)
- Most wickets – Maurice Tate 219 @ 13.97 (BB 8–30)
- Wisden Cricketers of the Year – Arthur Gilligan, Roy Kilner, George Macaulay, Cec Parkin, Maurice Tate

Australia

- Sheffield Shield – New South Wales
- Most runs – Percy Chapman 782 @ 65.16 (HS 134*)
- Most wickets – Arthur Mailey 55 @ 21.58 (BB 6–45)

India

- Bombay Quadrangular – Parsees

New Zealand

- Plunket Shield – Canterbury

South Africa

- Currie Cup – not contested

West Indies

- Inter-Colonial Tournament – not contested

== Cycling ==
Tour de France

- Henri Pélissier (France) wins the 17th Tour de France

Giro d'Italia

- Costante Girardengo of Maino wins the eleventh Giro d'Italia

== Figure skating ==
World Figure Skating Championships

- World Men's Champion – Fritz Kachler (Austria)
- World Women's Champion – Herma Szabo (Austria)
- World Pairs Champions – Ludowika Jakobsson-Eilers and Walter Jakobsson (Finland)

== Golf ==
Major tournaments

- British Open – Arthur Havers
- US Open – Bobby Jones
- USPGA Championship – Gene Sarazen

Other tournaments

- British Amateur – Roger Wethered
- US Amateur – Max Marston

== Horse racing ==
England

- Grand National – Sergeant Murphy
- 1,000 Guineas Stakes – Tranquil
- 2,000 Guineas Stakes – Ellangowan
- The Derby – Papyrus
- The Oaks – Brownhylda
- St. Leger Stakes – Tranquil

Australia

- Melbourne Cup – Bitalli

Canada

- King's Plate – Flowerful

France

- Prix de l'Arc de Triomphe – Parth

Ireland

- Irish Grand National – Be Careful
- Irish Derby Stakes – Waygood

USA

- Kentucky Derby – Zev
- Preakness Stakes – Vigil
- Belmont Stakes – Zev

== Ice hockey ==
Stanley Cup

- 29–31 March — Ottawa Senators wins the Stanley Cup for the fifth time, defeating the Edmonton Eskimos by 2 games to 0 in the 1923 Stanley Cup Finals

Sweden

- Klass I, a professional ice hockey league in Sweden, as predecessor for Swedish Hockey League, first officially game held on January 23.

== Multi-sport events ==
Far Eastern Championship Games

- The 6th Far Eastern Championship Games is held at Osaka, Japan.

== Rowing ==
The Boat Race

- 24 March — Oxford wins the 75th Oxford and Cambridge Boat Race

== Rugby league ==
England

- Championship – Hull Kingston Rovers
- Challenge Cup final – Leeds 28–3 Hull F.C. at Belle Vue, Wakefield
- Lancashire League Championship – Wigan
- Yorkshire League Championship – Hull
- Lancashire County Cup – Wigan 20–2 Leigh
- Yorkshire County Cup – York 5–0 Batley

Australia

- NSW Premiership – Eastern Suburbs 15–12 South Sydney (grand final)

== Rugby union ==
Five Nations Championship

- 36th Five Nations Championship series is won by England who complete the Grand Slam.

== Speed skating ==
Speed Skating World Championships

- Men's All-round Champion – Clas Thunberg (Finland)

== Tennis ==
Australia

- Australian Men's Singles Championship – Pat O'Hara Wood (Australia) defeats Bert St. John (Australia) 6–1 6–1 6–3
- Australian Women's Singles Championship – Margaret Molesworth (Australia) defeats Esna Boyd Robertson (Australia) 6–1 7–5

England

- Wimbledon Men's Singles Championship – Bill Johnston (USA) defeats Francis Hunter (USA) 6–0 6–3 6–1
- Wimbledon Women's Singles Championship – Suzanne Lenglen (France) defeats Kitty McKane Godfree (Great Britain) 6–2 6–2

France

- French Men's Singles Championship – François Blanchy (France) defeats Max Decugis (France) 1–6 6–2 6–0 6–2
- French Women's Singles Championship – Suzanne Lenglen (France) defeats Germaine Golding (France) 6–1 6–4

USA

- American Men's Singles Championship – Bill Tilden (USA) defeats Bill Johnston (USA) 6–4 6–1 6–4
- American Women's Singles Championship – Helen Wills Moody (USA) defeats Molla Bjurstedt Mallory (Norway) 6–2 6–1

Davis Cup

- 1923 International Lawn Tennis Challenge – United States 4–1 Australia at West Side Tennis Club (grass) New York City, United States

== Notes ==
^{a} The Grand Final was postponed owing to heavy rain, creating the latest finish to a VFL/AFL season.
