= 1911 Australasian Championships – Singles =

Singles
- 1911 Australasian Championships

Final
- Champion: (Australia) Norman Brookes
- Runner-up: (Australia) Horace Rice
- Score: 6–1, 6–2, 6–3

Details
- Draw: 16

Events
Singles	Doubles
- Australasian Championships

Norman Brookes won in the final 6–1, 6–2, 6–3 against Horace Rice to win the men's singles tennis title at the 1911 Australasian Championships.

Rodney Heath was the defending champion, but lost in the quarterfinals to Norman Brookes.

== Draw ==
Key

- Q = Qualifier
- WC = Wild card
- LL = Lucky loser
- Alt = Alternate
- ITF = ITF entry
- PR = Protected ranking
- SR = Special ranking
- SE = Special exempt
- JE = Junior exempt
- JR = Junior Accelerator Programme entrant
- CO = College Accelerator Programme entrant
- NG = Next Gen Accelerator Program entrant
- w/o = Walkover
- r = Retired
- d = Defaulted

=== Finals ===
Semifinals
(Australia) Norman Brookes	7	6	6
(Australia) Robert M. Rolland	5	3	1
(Australia) Arthur O'Hara Wood	5	3	6	1
(Australia) Horace Rice	7	6	2	6

Final
(Australia) Norman Brookes	6	6	6
(Australia) Horace Rice	1	2	3

=== Top half ===
First round
(Australia) Rodney Heath	8	5	7	6
(Australia) Alfred B. Jones	6	7	5	1

Second round
(Australia) Norman Brookes	6	6	6
(Australia) Francis E. Barritt	1	2	1
(Australia) Rodney Heath	6	6	6
(Australia) John J. Addison	3	4	1
(Australia) Robert M. Rolland	9	7	6
(Australia) Rupert Wertheim	7	5	4
(Australia) F. Ernest Down	4	6	4	11	6
(Australia) Charles N. Barnard	6	3	6	9	2

Quarterfinals
(Australia) Norman Brookes	4	6	6	6
(Australia) Rodney Heath	6	4	2	3
(Australia) Robert M. Rolland	6	6	6
(Australia) F. Ernest Down	3	4	3

Semifinals
(Australia) Norman Brookes	7	6	6
(Australia) Robert M. Rolland	5	3	1

=== Bottom half ===
First round

Second round
(Australia) Arthur O'Hara Wood	w/o
(Australia) A.W. Foster
(Australia) Samuel P. England	6	6	6
(Australia) P. F. Rowe	0	1	3
(Australia) Horace Rice	6	6	6
(Australia) Ronald Thomas	1	4	3

Quarterfinals
(Australia) Arthur O'Hara Wood	6	6	6
(Australia) Samuel P. England	1	2	3
(Australia) Horace Rice	6	6	6
(Australia) Ashley Campbell	4	2	4

Semifinals
(Australia) Arthur O'Hara Wood	5	3	6	1
(Australia) Horace Rice	7	6	2	6

Preceded by 1911 U.S. National Championships	Grand Slam men's singles	Succeeded by 1912 Wimbledon Championships
