= 1910 Australasian Championships – Singles =

Singles
- 1910 Australasian Championships

Final
- Champion: (Australia) Rodney Heath
- Runner-up: (Australia) Horace Rice
- Score: 6–4, 6–3, 6–2

Details
- Draw: 14
- Seeds: –

Events
Singles	Doubles
- Australasian Championships

Rodney Heath defeated Horace Rice 6–4, 6–3, 6–2 in the final to win the men's singles tennis title at the 1910 Australasian Championships.

== Draw ==
=== Key ===
- Q = Qualifier
- WC = Wild card
- LL = Lucky loser
- r = Retired

First round
(Australia) R. Paxton	6	6	6
(Australia) A. Smith	0	2	2
(New Zealand) Harry Parker	6	5	6	6
(Australia) A. Roy Taylor	4	7	1	3
(Australia) Rodney Heath	6	6	6
(Australia) J.L. O'Dea	1	2	3
(Australia) H.F. Hunt	6	6	6
(Australia) F. Wyllie	2	4	4
(Australia) Robert Bowen	6	6	6
(Australia) Victor V. Rudder	2	0	3
(Australia) Ashley Campbell	6	3	6	9	6
(Australia) Francis E. Barritt	8	6	2	7	3

Second round
(Australia) R. Reid	6	6	6
(Australia) R. Paxton	0	3	1
(New Zealand) Harry Parker	2	4	7
(Australia) Rodney Heath	6	6	9
(Australia) H.F. Hunt	9	4	3
(Australia) Robert Bowen	11	6	6
(Australia) Ashley Campbell	2	2	6	2
(Australia) Horace Rice	6	6	4	6

Semifinals
(Australia) R. Reid	0	3	5
(Australia) Rodney Heath	6	6	7
(Australia) Robert Bowen	3	1	6	5
(Australia) Horace Rice	6	6	3	7

Final
(Australia) Rodney Heath	6	6	6
(Australia) Horace Rice	4	3	2

Preceded by 1909 U.S. National Championships	Grand Slam men's singles	Succeeded by 1910 Wimbledon Championships
