= 1906 Australasian Championships – Singles =

Singles
- 1906 Australasian Championships

Final
- Champion: (New Zealand) Anthony Wilding
- Runner-up: (New Zealand) Francis Fisher
- Score: 6–0, 6–4, 6–4

Details
- Draw: 8
- Seeds: –

Events
Singles	Doubles
- Australasian Championships

Anthony Wilding defeated Francis Fisher 6–0, 6–4, 6–4 in the final to win the men's singles tennis title at the 1906 Australasian Championships. This event (now known as the Australian Open) was a tennis tournament played on twelve grass courts in Hagley Park, Christchurch, New Zealand. The tournament, part of the Grand Slam, was held from 26 to 31 December.

== Main draw ==
Key

- Q = Qualifier
- WC = Wild card
- LL = Lucky loser
- Alt = Alternate
- ITF = ITF entry
- PR = Protected ranking
- SR = Special ranking
- SE = Special exempt
- JE = Junior exempt
- JR = Junior Accelerator Programme entrant
- CO = College Accelerator Programme entrant
- NG = Next Gen Accelerator Program entrant
- w/o = Walkover
- r = Retired
- d = Defaulted

=== Draw ===
First round
(New Zealand) Anthony Wilding	6	6	6
(New Zealand) Cecil C. Cox	2	2	1
(New Zealand) Harry Parker	6	6	6
(New Zealand) Richard Harman	1	2	0
(New Zealand) Francis Fisher	2	7	6	5	6
(Australia) Rodney Heath	6	5	1	7	2
(New Zealand) Thomas R. Quill
(New Zealand) William Goss	w/o

Semifinals
(New Zealand) Anthony Wilding	6	7	3	6
(New Zealand) Harry Parker	4	5	6	0
(New Zealand) Francis Fisher	6	3	6	6
(New Zealand) Thomas R. Quill	4	6	2	3

Final
(New Zealand) Anthony Wilding	6	6	6
(New Zealand) Francis Fisher	0	4	4

Preceded by 1906 U.S. National Championships	Grand Slam men's singles	Succeeded by 1907 Wimbledon Championships
