= 1911 Australasian Championships =

- Date: 21–25 November 1911
- Edition: 7th
- Category: Grand Slam
- Surface: Grass
- Location: Melbourne, Victoria, Australia
- Venue: Warehouseman's Cricket Ground

Champions

Singles
- (Australia) Norman Brookes

Doubles
- (Australia) Rodney Heath / (United Kingdom of Great Britain and Ireland) Randolph Lycett
- Australasian Championships

The 1911 Australasian Championships was a tennis tournament that took place on outdoor grass courts at the Warehouseman's Cricket Ground, Melbourne, Australia. It was the 7th edition of the Australian Championships (now known as the Australian Open), the second held in Melbourne and the third Grand Slam tournament of the year.

== Finals ==
=== Singles ===
(Australia) Norman Brookes defeated (Australia) Horace Rice 6–1, 6–2, 6–3

=== Doubles ===
(Australia) Rodney Heath / (United Kingdom of Great Britain and Ireland) Randolph Lycett defeated (Australia) John Addison / (Australia) Norman Brookes 6–2, 7–5, 6–0

Preceded by 1911 U.S. National Championships	Grand Slams	Succeeded by 1912 Wimbledon Championships
