= 1907 Australasian Championships – Singles =

Singles
- 1907 Australasian Championships

Final
- Champion: (Australia) Horace Rice
- Runner-up: (New Zealand) Harry Parker
- Score: 6–3, 6–4, 6–4

Details
- Draw: 20
- Seeds: –

Events
Singles	Doubles
- Australasian Championships

Horace Rice defeated Harry Parker, 6–3, 6–4, 6–4, in the final to win the men's singles tennis title at the 1907 Australasian Championships. The event (now known as the Australian Open) was a tennis tournament played on Grass courts in Brisbane, Australia. The tournament was held from 18 to 24 August

== Main draw ==
Key

- Q = Qualifier
- WC = Wild card
- LL = Lucky loser
- Alt = Alternate
- ITF = ITF entry
- PR = Protected ranking
- SR = Special ranking
- SE = Special exempt
- JE = Junior exempt
- JR = Junior Accelerator Programme entrant
- CO = College Accelerator Programme entrant
- NG = Next Gen Accelerator Program entrant
- w/o = Walkover
- r = Retired
- d = Defaulted

=== Finals ===
Quarterfinals
(Australia) Horace Rice	4	6	6	6
(Australia) H.M. Turner	6	1	0	3
(Australia) William Gregg	6	2	6	2	7
(Australia) A.E. Turton	2	6	2	6	5
(New Zealand) Harry Parker	6	6	6
(Australia) V.V. Rudder	1	1	3
(Australia) Eric Pockley	8	6	7
(Australia) Gordon Wright	6	2	5

Semifinals
(Australia) Horace Rice	6	6	3	6
(Australia) William Gregg	0	2	6	4
(New Zealand) Harry Parker	8	6	2	6
(Australia) Eric Pockley	6	0	6	3

Final
(Australia) Horace Rice	6	6	6
(New Zealand) Harry Parker	3	4	4

=== Top half ===
First round
(Australia) H. M. Turner	6	6	6
(Australia) G. Crouch	2	0	2
(Australia) S. N. Doust	6	5	rtd.
(Australia) Sayers	2	3

Second round
(Australia) H. Rice	6	6	6
(Australia) N. Marsh	0	0	1
(Australia) H. M. Turner	12	4	6	7
(Australia) S. N. Doust	10	6	3	5
(Australia) W. Gregg	w/o
(Australia) Fowles
(Australia) A. E. Turton	7	1	6	5	6
(Australia) L. Thurlow	5	6	3	7	4

Quarterfinals
(Australia) H. Rice	4	6	6	6
(Australia) H. M. Turner	6	1	0	3
(United Kingdom) W. Gregg	6	2	6	2	7
(Australia) A. E. Turton	2	6	2	6	5

Semifinals
(Australia) H. Rice	6	6	3	6
(United Kingdom) W. Gregg	0	2	6	4

=== Bottom half ===
First round
(Australia) G. Wright	7	6	2	6
(Australia) Gill	5	4	6	1
(Australia) M. Marsh	6	6	6
(Australia) Allom	4	4	4

Second round
(New Zealand) H. A. Parker	6	6	6
(Australia) F. Cupples	1	1	1
(Australia) V. V. Rudder	6	5	4	6	6
(Australia) Kilgour	2	7	6	1	2
(Australia) E. O. Pockley	6	6	3	6
(Australia) C. B. St. John	1	3	6	1
(Australia) G. Wright	6	6	6
(Australia) M. Marsh	1	1	1

Quarterfinals
(New Zealand) H. A. Parker	6	6	6
(Australia) V. V. Rudder	1	1	3
(Australia) E. O. Pockley	8	6	7
(Australia) G. Wright	6	2	5

Semifinals
(New Zealand) H. A. Parker	8	6	2	6
(Australia) E. O. Pockley	6	0	6	3

Preceded by 1907 Wimbledon Championships	Grand Slam men's singles	Succeeded by 1907 Australasian Championships
