= 1915 Australasian Championships – Singles =

Singles
- 1915 Australasian Championships

Final
- Champion: (United Kingdom of Great Britain and Ireland) Gordon Lowe
- Runner-up: (Australia) Horace Rice
- Score: 4–6, 6–1, 6–1, 6–4

Details
- Draw: 16

Events
Singles	Doubles
- Australasian Championships

Gordon Lowe defeated Horace Rice 4–6, 6–1, 6–1, 6–4 in the final to win the men's singles tennis title at the 1915 Australasian Championships.

== Draw ==
=== Key ===
- Q = Qualifier
- WC = Wild card
- LL = Lucky loser
- r = Retired

First round
(United Kingdom) Gordon Lowe	8	6	6
(Australia) Turner	6	2	0
(Australia) Roy F. Highett	w/o
(Australia) F. Cupples
(Australia) Bert St. John	6	6	6
(Australia) Frank Peach	4	4	2
(Australia) R. J. Goodman	4	6	6	8
(Australia) M. Graham	6	3	2	6
(Australia) Horace Rice	6	6	6
(Australia) T. Quill	3	4	0
(Australia) F. Lendrum	6	3	7	6
(New Zealand) Briggs	4	6	5	0
(Australia) Clarence Todd	4	8	7	6
(Australia) Bassett	6	6	5	3
(Australia) Walter H. Smith	6	6	6
(Australia) G. Highett	0	3	3

Second round
(United Kingdom) Gordon Lowe	6	6	6
(Australia) Roy F. Highett	3	2	3
(Australia) Bert St. John	6	6	6
(Australia) R.J. Goodman	3	3	2
(Australia) Horace Rice	6	6	6
(Australia) F.J. Lendrum	3	2	3
(Australia) Clarence Todd	6	6	6
(Australia) Walter H. Smith	2	3	2

Semifinals
(United Kingdom) Gordon Lowe	3	6	7	7
(Australia) Bert St. John	6	3	5	5
(Australia) Horace Rice	4	2	8	6	7
(Australia) Clarence Todd	6	6	6	1	5

Final
(United Kingdom) Gordon Lowe	4	6	6	6
(Australia) Horace Rice	6	1	1	4

Preceded by 1914 U.S. National Championships – Men's singles	Grand Slam men's singles	Succeeded by 1915 U.S. National Championships – Men's singles
