= 1907 Wimbledon Championships – Men's doubles =

Men's doubles
- 1907 Wimbledon Championships

Final
- Champions: (Australia) Norman Brookes (New Zealand) Anthony Wilding
- Runners-up: (United States) Karl Behr (United States) Beals Wright
- Score: 6–4, 6–4, 6–2

Details
- Draw: 29
- Seeds: –

Events
Singles	men	women
Doubles	men	women
← 1906 ·	Wimbledon Championships	· 1908 →

Norman Brookes and Anthony Wilding defeated Karl Behr and Beals Wright 6–4, 6–4, 6–2 in the all comers' final to win the gentlemen's doubles tennis title at the 1907 Wimbledon Championships. The reigning champions Frank Riseley and Sydney Smith did not defend their title.

== Draw ==
=== Key ===
- Q = Qualifier
- WC = Wild card
- LL = Lucky loser
- Alt = Alternate
- SE = Special exempt
- PR = Protected ranking
- ITF = ITF entry
- JE = Junior exempt
- w/o = Walkover
- r = Retired
- d = Defaulted
- SR = Special ranking

=== All comers' finals ===
Semifinals
(United States) Karl Behr (United States) Beals Wright	6	6	6
(United Kingdom) Roderick McNair (United Kingdom) George Thomas	2	1	4
(Australia) Norman Brookes (New Zealand) Anthony Wilding	6	6	6
(United Kingdom) Xenophon Casdagli (United Kingdom) Major Ritchie	1	3	2

Final
(United States) Karl Behr (United States) Beals Wright	4	4	2
(Australia) Norman Brookes (New Zealand) Anthony Wilding	6	6	6

=== Top half ===
First round
(United States) Karl Behr (United States) Beals Wright
(Australia) Stanley Doust (United States) JH Winston	w/o
(United Kingdom) Arthur Lowe (United Kingdom) Gordon Lowe	6	3	0
(United Kingdom) Sydney Adams (United Kingdom) AL Bentley	4	6	0^{r}
(United Kingdom) George Ball-Greene (United Kingdom) Wilberforce Eaves	6	6	1	6
(United Kingdom) Fritz Goldberg (United Kingdom) Theodore Mavrogordato	4	1	6	2
(United Kingdom) William Crawley (United States) DP Rhodes
(United Kingdom) GW Pratt (United Kingdom) JA Randall	w/o
(United Kingdom) Roderick McNair (United Kingdom) George Thomas	6	6	6
(United Kingdom) H Blomberg (United Kingdom) F Fredall	1	1	3
(United Kingdom) CD Beater (United Kingdom) Percy Fitton
(United Kingdom) WP Haviland (United Kingdom) GS Wilson	w/o
(United Kingdom) Kenneth Powell (United Kingdom) Leslie Powell	6	6	6
(Germany) Oscar Kreuzer (United Kingdom) A. Wallis Myers	4	4	2

Second round
(United Kingdom) Herbert Roper Barrett (United Kingdom) Arthur Gore	10	6	1	4	2
(United States) K Behr (United States) B Wright	8	4	6	6	6
(United Kingdom) A Lowe (United Kingdom) G Lowe	6	5	1	6	8
(United Kingdom) G Ball-Greene (United Kingdom) W Eaves	4	7	6	3	6
(United Kingdom) W Crawley (United States) DP Rhodes	2	6	10	8	3
(United Kingdom) R McNair (United Kingdom) G Thomas	6	8	8	6	6
(United Kingdom) CD Beater (United Kingdom) P Fitton	5	6	6	7	7
(United Kingdom) K Powell (United Kingdom) L Powell	7	8	3	5	5

Quarterfinals
(United States) K Behr (United States) B Wright	4	6	6	6
(United Kingdom) A Lowe (United Kingdom) G Lowe	6	2	1	4
(United Kingdom) R McNair (United Kingdom) G Thomas	7	6	6
(United Kingdom) CD Beater (United Kingdom) P Fitton	5	4	1

Semifinals
(United States) K Behr (United States) B Wright	6	6	6
(United Kingdom) R McNair (United Kingdom) G Thomas	2	1	4

=== Bottom half ===
First round
(Australia) Norman Brookes (New Zealand) Anthony Wilding	6	6	6
(United Kingdom) Arthur Cronin (United Kingdom) EW Timmis	0	0	1
(Austria) Rolf Kinzl (Austria) Kurt von Wessely	6	9	6
(United Kingdom) CH Mounsey (United Kingdom) Alfred Sterry	3	7	0
(United Kingdom) J Robinson (United Kingdom) Henry Wilson-Fox	7	6	6
(United States) H Behr (United Kingdom) ER Clarke	5	3	2
(United Kingdom) TD Stoward (United Kingdom) JB Ward	8	6	3	8	6
(United Kingdom) Peter Hicks (United Kingdom) AR Sawyer	6	3	6	10	2
(United Kingdom) Henry Pollard (United Kingdom) Albert Prebble	6	11	6
(United Kingdom) GR Bennett (United Kingdom) Neville Durlacher	1	9	4
(United Kingdom) F Chesterton (United Kingdom) Hugh Comyn	3	7	10	6
(United Kingdom) Frederick Plaskitt (United Kingdom) Hugh Plaskitt	6	5	8	1

Second round
(Australia) N Brookes (New Zealand) A Wilding	6	6	6
(Austria) R Kinzl (Austria) K von Wessely	1	1	2
(United Kingdom) J Robinson (United Kingdom) H Wilson-Fox	2	3	4
(United Kingdom) TD Stoward (United Kingdom) JB Ward	6	6	6
(United Kingdom) H Pollard (United Kingdom) A Prebble	6	7	6
(United Kingdom) F Chesterton (United Kingdom) H Comyn	4	5	0
(United Kingdom) Xenophon Casdagli (United Kingdom) Major Ritchie	6	6	6
(United Kingdom) RH Hotham (United Kingdom) PTG Pipon	0	1	2

Quarterfinals
(Australia) N Brookes (New Zealand) A Wilding	6	6	6
(United Kingdom) TD Stoward (United Kingdom) JB Ward	1	1	1
(United Kingdom) H Pollard (United Kingdom) A Prebble	6	4	2
(United Kingdom) X Casdagli (United Kingdom) M Ritchie	8	6	6

Semifinals
(Australia) N Brookes (New Zealand) A Wilding	6	6	6
(United Kingdom) X Casdagli (United Kingdom) M Ritchie	1	3	2
