= Clarence Todd =

Clarence Todd may refer to:

- Clarence King (1842–1901), American geologist, mountaineer, and author, who also went by Clarence Todd
- Clarence Todd (tennis) (1892–1973), Australian tennis player
