= 1907 Australasian Championships =

- Date: 18–24 August 1907
- Edition: 3rd
- Surface: Grass
- Location: Brisbane, Australia
- Venue: Auchenflower

Champions

Singles
- (Australia) Horace Rice

Doubles
- (Australia) William Gregg / (New Zealand) Harry Parker
- Australasian Championships

The 1907 Australasian Championships (now known as the Australian Open) was a tennis tournament played on Grass courts at Auchenflower in Brisbane, Australia. The event is a part of the Grand Slam. It was the third edition of the tournament and was held from 18 to 24 August 1907. Horace Rice won the singles title.

== Finals ==
=== Singles ===
(Australia) Horace Rice defeated (New Zealand) Harry Parker 6–3, 6–4, 6–4

=== Doubles ===
(Australia) William Gregg / (New Zealand) Harry Parker defeated (Australia) Horace Rice / (Australia) George Wright 6–2, 3–6, 6–2, 6–2

Preceded by 1907 Wimbledon Championships	Grand Slams	Succeeded by 1907 U.S. National Championships
