= Lowe baronets =

Title in the Baronetage of United Kingdom

- Escutcheon of the Lowe baronets of Edgbaston
- Creation date: 1918
- Status: extant
- Motto: Spero meliora, I hope for better things

The Lowe Baronetcy, of Edgbaston in the City of Birmingham, is a title in the Baronetage of the United Kingdom. It was created on 30 January 1918 for Francis Lowe, Conservative Member of Parliament for Edgbaston from 1898 to 1929.

== Lowe baronets, of Edgbaston (1918) ==
- Sir Francis William Lowe, 1st Baronet (1852–1929)
- Sir Francis Gordon Lowe, 2nd Baronet (1884–1972)
- Sir Francis Reginald Gordon Lowe, 3rd Baronet (1931–1986)
- Sir Thomas William Gordon Lowe, 4th Baronet (born 1963)

The heir apparent is the present holder's son Theodore Christopher William Lowe (born 2000).
