= John Lowe (cricketer) =

English cricketer (1888–1970)

John Claude Malcolm Lowe (21 February 1888 – 27 July 1970) was an English cricketer who played first-class cricket in 35 matches for Oxford University and Warwickshire between 1907 and 1910. He was born at Edgbaston, Birmingham, and died at Hastings, East Sussex.

Lowe was the son of Sir Francis Lowe, 1st Baronet who was MP for Edgbaston from 1898 to 1929. Two of his brothers were talented lawn tennis players: Sir Francis Lowe, 2nd Baronet and Arthur Lowe.

Educated at Uppingham School, where he was captain of the cricket eleven, and at Oriel College, Oxford, Lowe was a lower-order right-handed batsman and a right-arm fast-medium bowler who made the ball swerve. He took five Lancashire wickets for just 30 runs on his debut for Oxford University in 1907. In the next game, he did even better, with six Worcestershire wickets for 43 runs in the first innings, and nine in the match. He was unable to sustain this success, but did enough to be awarded his Blue by appearing in the University Match against Cambridge University where, bowling in tandem with Humphrey Gilbert, he took seven wickets in all and gave Oxford a first-innings lead, but ended up on the losing side. When the university cricket season was over for 1907, Lowe made a single appearance for Warwickshire in a County Championship game against Hampshire, but he took only one wicket and did not play for the county again.

In both 1908 and 1909, Lowe continue to play for Oxford University, and in 1908 he achieved both his best bowling and batting performances. In the match against Surrey, after Oxford had been made to follow on. Lowe's batting, hitherto negligible, contributed 46 runs against some none-too-demanding Surrey bowling, before he was a rare victim for Jack Hobbs. In a run-heavy game against the "Gentlemen of England" immediately before the 1908 University Match, he took eight first-innings wickets for 144 runs and then, because the match was being used as a trial, was not bowled at all in the second innings, so that he never did achieve 10 wickets in a game. He took five wickets in the 1908 University Match and was batting when Oxford secured a narrow two-wicket victory. He had less success in 1909, but still did enough to secure a third Blue, though he took only one wicket in the University Match of that year.

In 1910, Lowe returned to Oxford for a fourth academic year and appeared in many of the first-class matches, but he lost form and was left out of the side to meet Cambridge. He did not play again in first-class cricket after this. His obituary in Wisden Cricketers' Almanack states that he also won a Blue for field hockey and was a "good golfer".

Lowe's later career is not always clear: he appears to have been in the Royal Naval Reserve during the First World War. In the 1920s, he was mentioned in the London Gazette as an officer in the Royal Air Force, from which he retired with the rank of wing commander in 1938.
