= Sir Francis Lowe, 1st Baronet =

British politician

The Right Honourable Sir Francis Lowe

Member of Parliament for Birmingham Edgbaston
- In office 1898–1929
- Preceded by: George Dixon
- Succeeded by: Neville Chamberlain

Personal details
- Born: Francis William Lowe; 8 January 1852
- Died: 12 November 1929 (aged 77)
- Spouse: Mary Holden
- Children: Francis; Arthur; John; A daughter
- Parent: William Lowe (father)
- Education: Birmingham Grammar School
- Alma mater: London University

Sir Francis William Lowe, 1st Baronet (8 January 1852 – 12 November 1929) was a British Conservative Party politician.

He was elected as the Member of Parliament for Edgbaston at a by-election in February 1898, and held the seat until he stood down at the 1929 general election, when he was succeeded by future UK Prime Minister Neville Chamberlain who had moved from Birmingham Ladywood.

He was made a Baronet in 1918, of Edgbaston in the City of Birmingham, and was appointed as Privy Councillor in the 1929 Dissolution Honours.

He was married to Mary Holden; they had four children, including his heir Francis Gordon, who was a well-known tennis player before the First World War, as was another son, Arthur. A third son, John, played first-class cricket.

== Arms ==
Coat of arms of Sir Francis Lowe, 1st Baronet

Notes
Granted on 14 February 1918 by Garter Scott-Gatty and Clarenceux Weldon.
Crest
A demi-gryphon Erminois resting the sinister paw on a Stafford knot Sable.
Escutcheon
Erminois on a bend engrailed cottised plain Azure between two Stafford knots Sable three wolves' heads erased Or.
Motto
Spero Meliora

Parliament of the United Kingdom
Preceded by George Dixon	Member of Parliament for Birmingham Edgbaston; 1898–1929	Succeeded by Neville Chamberlain
Baronetage of the United Kingdom
New creation	Baronet (of Edgbaston); 1918–1929	Succeeded by Francis Gordon Lowe
