= 1923 Australasian Championships =

- Date: 11–18 August 1923
- Edition: 16th
- Category: Grand Slam (ITF)
- Surface: Grass
- Location: Brisbane, Australia
- Venue: Milton Courts

Champions

Men's singles
- (Australia) Pat O'Hara Wood

Women's singles
- (Australia) Margaret Molesworth

Men's doubles
- (Australia) Pat O'Hara Wood / (Australia) Bert St. John

Women's doubles
- (Australia) Esna Boyd / (Australia) Sylvia Lance Harper

Mixed doubles
- (Australia) Sylvia Lance Harper / (Australia) Horace Rice
- Australasian Championships

The 1923 Australian Championships was a tennis tournament that took place on outdoor Grass courts at the Milton Courts, Brisbane, Australia, from 11 August to 18 August. It was the 16th edition of the Australian Championships (now known as the Australian Open), the third held in Brisbane, and the second Grand Slam tournament of the year. The singles titles were won by Pat O'Hara Wood and Margaret Molesworth.

== Finals ==
=== Men's singles ===
(Australia) Pat O'Hara Wood defeated (Australia) Bert St John 6–1, 6–1, 6–3

=== Women's singles ===
(Australia) Margaret Molesworth defeated (Australia) Esna Boyd 6–1, 7–5

=== Men's doubles ===
(Australia) Pat O'Hara Wood / (Australia) Bert St. John defeated (Australia) Dudley Bullough / (Australia) Horace Rice 6–4, 6–3, 3–6, 6–0

=== Women's doubles ===
(Australia) Esna Boyd / (Australia) Sylvia Lance Harper defeated (Australia) Margaret Molesworth / (Australia) Mrs. H. Turner 6–1, 6–4

=== Mixed doubles ===
(Australia) Sylvia Lance Harper / (Australia) Horace Rice defeated (Australia) Margaret Molesworth / (Australia) Bert St. John 2–6, 6–4, 6–4

Preceded by 1923 Wimbledon Championships	Grand Slams	Succeeded by 1923 U.S. National Championships
