= 1907 Wimbledon Championships – Women's singles =

Women's singles
- 1907 Wimbledon Championships

Final
- Champion: (United States) May Sutton
- Runner-up: (United Kingdom) Dorothea Lambert Chambers
- Score: 6–1, 6–4

Details
- Draw: 42
- Seeds: –

Events
Singles	men	women
Doubles	men	women
← 1906 ·	Wimbledon Championships	· 1908 →

May Sutton defeated Constance Wilson 6–4, 6–2 in the All Comers' Final, and then defeated the reigning champion Dorothea Lambert Chambers 6–1, 6–4 in the challenge round to win the ladies' singles tennis title at the 1907 Wimbledon Championships.

== Draw ==
=== Key ===
- Q = Qualifier
- WC = Wild card
- LL = Lucky loser
- Alt = Alternate
- SE = Special exempt
- PR = Protected ranking
- ITF = ITF entry
- JE = Junior exempt
- w/o = Walkover
- r = Retired
- d = Defaulted
- SR = Special ranking

=== Challenge round ===
Challenge Round
(United States) May Sutton	6	6
(United Kingdom) Dorothea Lambert Chambers	1	4

=== All comers' finals ===
Quarterfinals
(United Kingdom) EL Bosworth	6	6
(United Kingdom) ME Brown	1	2
(United Kingdom) CHE Meyer	0	3
(United States) May Sutton	6	6
(United Kingdom) Constance Wilson	6	9
(United Kingdom) Alice Greene	2	7
(United Kingdom) Blanche Hillyard	6	6
(United Kingdom) Edith Johnson	2	3

Semifinals
(United Kingdom) EL Bosworth	2	2
(United States) May Sutton	6	6
(United Kingdom) Constance Wilson	6	6
(United Kingdom) Blanche Hillyard	3	2

Final
(United States) May Sutton	6	6
(United Kingdom) Constance Wilson	4	2

=== Top half ===
==== Section 1 ====
First round

Second round
(United Kingdom) EL Bosworth	6	6
(Argentina) Marjorie Boadle	1	3
(United Kingdom) J Coles	7	6
(United Kingdom) M Bloxsome	5	3
(United Kingdom) D Johnston	6	6
(Canada) Violet Summerhayes	2	1
(United Kingdom) ME Brown	5	8	8
(United Kingdom) Hilda Lane	7	6	6

Third round
(United Kingdom) EL Bosworth	6	6
(United Kingdom) J Coles	3	3
(United Kingdom) D Johnston	3	5
(United Kingdom) ME Brown	6	7

Quarterfinals
(United Kingdom) EL Bosworth	6	6
(United Kingdom) ME Brown	1	2

==== Section 2 ====
First round
(United Kingdom) CHE Meyer	6	6
(United Kingdom) F Walter	3	2
(United States) May Sutton	6	6
(United Kingdom) Winifred Slocock	2	1
(United Kingdom) Toupie Lowther	7	6
(United Kingdom) Dora Boothby	5	3
(United Kingdom) Agatha Morton	6	6
(Austria) Willy Klima	0	2
(United Kingdom) Mildred Coles	6	6
(United Kingdom) M Taplin	2	2

Second round
(United Kingdom) AG Ransome	6	7
(Argentina) Dorothy Boadle	4	5
(United Kingdom) J Tripp	2	2
(United Kingdom) CHE Meyer	6	6
(United States) M Sutton	6	6
(United Kingdom) T Lowther	4	4
(United Kingdom) A Morton	6	6
(United Kingdom) M Coles	1	2

Third round
(United Kingdom) AG Ransome	6	4
(United Kingdom) CHE Meyer	8	6
(United States) M Sutton	6	6
(United Kingdom) A Morton	0	2

Quarterfinals
(United Kingdom) CHE Meyer	0	3
(United States) M Sutton	6	6

=== Bottom half ===
==== Section 3 ====
First round
(United Kingdom) Constance Wilson	6	6
(United Kingdom) Mrs Armstrong	1	1
(United Kingdom) EE Sargeant
(United Kingdom) Violet Pinckney	w/o
(United Kingdom) Ruth Durlacher	6	6
(United Kingdom) Miss Adams	3	1
(United Kingdom) Gladys Eastlake-Smith	6	9
(United Kingdom) Charlotte Sterry	3	7
(United Kingdom) Madeline O'Neill	6	6
(Austria) Mita Klima	1	2

Second round
(United Kingdom) C Wilson	6	6
(United Kingdom) EE Sargeant	1	0
(United Kingdom) R Durlacher	6	1	4
(United Kingdom) G Eastlake-Smith	1	6	6
(United Kingdom) M O'Neill	3	0
(United Kingdom) Alice Greene	6	6
(United Kingdom) EB Hawker	6	6
(Argentina) W Boadle	1	3

Third round
(United Kingdom) C Wilson	6	6
(United Kingdom) G Eastlake-Smith	1	4
(United Kingdom) A Greene	6	6
(United Kingdom) EB Hawker	1	2

Quarterfinals
(United Kingdom) C Wilson	6	9
(United Kingdom) A Greene	2	7

==== Section 4 ====
First round

Second round
(United Kingdom) Mabel Parton	6	6
(United Kingdom) Miss Groombridge	2	2
(United Kingdom) Blanche Hillyard	6	6
(United Kingdom) HI Harper	1	1
(United Kingdom) Edith Johnson	6	6
(United Kingdom) Mrs Speck	3	2
(United Kingdom) D Taplin
(United Kingdom) Betty Nutcombe Quicke	w/o

Third round
(United Kingdom) M Parton	4	3
(United Kingdom) B Hillyard	6	6
(United Kingdom) E Johnson	6	6
(United Kingdom) D Taplin	3	0

Quarterfinals
(United Kingdom) B Hillyard	6	6
(United Kingdom) E Johnson	2	3

Preceded by 1906 U.S. National Championships – Women's singles	Grand Slam women's singles	Succeeded by 1907 U.S. National Championships – Women's singles
