= Mita Klima =

Austrian tennis player

- Country (sports): (Austria-Hungary) Austria–Hungary
- Born: 1892/93
- Died: April/May 1945; Berlin-Wannsee, Germany

Singles

Grand Slam singles results
- Wimbledon: 1R (1907)

Mita Klima (married name Mita Kribben; 1892/93 – April/May 1945) was an Austrian tennis player.

In 1907, Klima took part in the Wimbledon Championships at age 14, along with her elder sister Willy. She was the youngest participant in the women's competition at Wimbledon until Jennifer Capriati in 1990. She lost her first round match against Madeline O'Neill.

On 11 August 1915, Klima married tennis player and factory owner Curt Kribben. At this double wedding, Curt's sister Erna Kribben married tennis player Friedrich Wilhelm Rahe.

At the beginning of the 1930s, Klima took a job as a sports director at a golf club at Berlin-Wannsee, the Golf- und Landclub Berlin-Wannsee. She died during the last days of World War II when the clubhouse was destroyed by artillery grenades from the Red Army.
