= 1910 Australasian Championships =

- Date: 15–19 March 1910
- Edition: 6th
- Category: Grand Slam
- Surface: Grass
- Location: Adelaide, South Australia, Australia
- Venue: Adelaide Oval

Champions

Singles
- (Australia) Rodney Heath

Doubles
- (Australia) Ashley Campbell / (Australia) Horace Rice
- Australasian Championships

The 1910 Australasian Championships was a tennis tournament that took place on outdoor grass courts at the Adelaide Oval, Adelaide, Australia. It was the 6th edition of the Australasian Championships (now known as the Australian Open), the first held in Adelaide and the first Grand Slam tournament of the year.

== Finals ==
=== Singles ===
(Australia) Rodney Heath defeated (Australia) Horace Rice 6–4, 6–3, 6–2

=== Doubles ===
(Australia) Ashley Campbell / (Australia) Horace Rice defeated (Australia) Rodney Heath / (Australia) James O'Dea 6–3, 6–3, 6–2

Preceded by 1909 Australasian Championships	Grand Slams	Succeeded by 1910 Wimbledon Championships
