= 1915 Australasian Championships =

- Date: 13–21 August 1915
- Edition: 11th
- Category: Grand Slam (ITF)
- Surface: Grass
- Location: Brisbane, Queensland, Australia
- Venue: Auchenflower

Champions

Singles
- (United Kingdom) Gordon Lowe

Doubles
- (Australia) Horace Rice / (Australia) Clarence Todd
- Australasian Championships

The 1915 Australasian Championships was a tennis tournament that took place on outdoor Grass courts at the Auchenflower, Brisbane, Australia, from 13 August to 21 August. It was the 11th edition of the Australian Championships (now known as the Australian Open), the 2nd held in Brisbane, and the first Grand Slam tournament of the year. The men's singles title was won by Gordon Lowe.

== Finals ==
=== Singles ===
(United Kingdom) Gordon Lowe defeated (Australia) Horace Rice 4–6, 6–1, 6–1, 6–4

=== Doubles ===
(Australia) Horace Rice / (Australia) Clarence Todd defeated (United Kingdom) Gordon Lowe / (Australia) Bert St John, 8–6, 6–4, 7–9, 6–3

Preceded by 1914 U.S. National Championships	Grand Slams	Succeeded by 1915 U.S. National Championships
