= Robert M. Rolland =

Australian tennis player

Robert Rolland
- Full name: Robert Monteith Rolland OBE
- Country (sports): Australia
- Born: 6 February 1887; South Yarra, Victoria, Australia
- Died: 29 August 1976 (aged 89); Victoria, Australia
- Turned pro: 1909 (amateur tour)
- Retired: 1925

Singles

Grand Slam singles results
- Australian Open: QF (1911)

Doubles

Grand Slam doubles results
- Australian Open: SF (1911)

Robert Rolland (1887–1976) was an Australian tennis player. He completed a law degree at Melbourne university in 1910 and was admitted to practice law in 1911. Rolland entered the Australasian championships only once in 1911. He volleyed brilliantly to beat Rupert Wertheim. Then Rolland beat Ernest Down before losing to Norman Brookes in three sets. In world war 1, Rolland enlisted in the 58th battalion in 1916, but whilst on board ship contracted mumps and was hospitalised on arrival in England. He arrived in France in January 1917 and was made 2nd Lieutenant in the 60th battalion. Later he was appointed to the 15th infantry brigade headquarters. In late 1917 he broke his leg in a tobogganing accident. He was hospitalised and then sent home in 1918. After the war he married and moved to Sale and maintained a legal practice. He was also a town councillor. In 1957 he was awarded the OBE.
