= 1906 Australasian Championships =

- Date: 26–31 December 1906
- Edition: 2nd
- Surface: Grass
- Location: Christchurch, New Zealand
- Venue: Hagley Park

Champions

Singles
- (New Zealand) Anthony Wilding

Doubles
- (Australia) Rodney Heath / (New Zealand) Anthony Wilding
- Australasian Championships

The 1906 Australasian Championships (now known as the Australian Open) was a tennis tournament played on the grass court at Hagley Park in Christchurch, New Zealand the event is a part of the Grand Slam. It was the second edition of the tournament and was held from 26 to 31 December 1906. Anthony Wilding won the singles title.

== Finals ==
=== Singles ===
(New Zealand) Anthony Wilding defeated (New Zealand) Francis Fisher, 6–0, 6–4, 6–4.

=== Doubles ===
(Australia) Rodney Heath / (New Zealand) Anthony Wilding defeated (Australia) Cecil C. Cox / (New Zealand) Harry Parker, 6–2, 6–4, 6–2.

Preceded by 1906 U.S. National Championships	Grand Slams	Succeeded by 1907 Wimbledon Championships
