= 1907 Wimbledon Championships – Men's singles =

Men's singles
- 1907 Wimbledon Championships

Final
- Champion: (Australia) Norman Brookes
- Runner-up: (United Kingdom) Arthur Gore
- Score: 6–4, 6–2, 6–2

Details
- Draw: 85
- Seeds: –

Events
Singles	men	women
Doubles	men	women
← 1906 ·	Wimbledon Championships	· 1908 →

Norman Brookes defeated Arthur Gore 6–4, 6–2, 6–2 in the All-Comers final to win the gentlemen's singles tennis title at the 1907 Wimbledon Championships. The reigning champion Laurence Doherty did not defend his title. Brookes was the first overseas winner of the men's singles title. Four of the most promising international tennis players were concentrated in section 5 of the draw.

== Draw ==
=== Key ===
- Q = Qualifier
- WC = Wild card
- LL = Lucky loser
- Alt = Alternate
- SE = Special exempt
- PR = Protected ranking
- ITF = ITF entry
- JE = Junior exempt
- w/o = Walkover
- r = Retired
- d = Defaulted
- SR = Special ranking

=== All comers' finals ===
Quarterfinals
(United Kingdom) Arthur Gore	6	6	6
(United Kingdom) AR Sawyer	0	3	0
(United Kingdom) Lionel Escombe	0	6	3	6	3
(United Kingdom) Wilberforce Eaves	6	4	6	1	6
(Australia) Norman Brookes	6	6	6
(United Kingdom) Sydney Adams	1	3	3
(United Kingdom) Major Ritchie	6	6	6
(Germany) Oscar Kreuzer	4	1	2

Semifinals
(United Kingdom) Arthur Gore	9	7	6
(United Kingdom) Wilberforce Eaves	7	5	2
(Australia) Norman Brookes	6	6	6
(United Kingdom) Major Ritchie	0	1	4

Final
(United Kingdom) Arthur Gore	4	2	2
(Australia) Norman Brookes	6	6	6

=== Top half ===
==== Section 1 ====
First round

Second round
(Australia) Stanley Doust	1	6	6	6
(United Kingdom) CD Beater	6	2	3	3
(United States) JH Winston
(United Kingdom) Charles Ridding	w/o
(United Kingdom) Sydney Watts
(United Kingdom) David Hawes	w/o
(United Kingdom) Arthur Gore	6	6	6
(United Kingdom) WE Lane	1	3	1

Third round
(Australia) S Doust
(United States) JH Winston	w/o
(United Kingdom) S Watts	4	1	0
(United Kingdom) A Gore	6	6	6

Fourth round
(Australia) S Doust	1	8	4
(United Kingdom) A Gore	6	10	6

==== Section 2 ====
First round

Second round
(United Kingdom) Roderick McNair
(United Kingdom) Reginald Gamble	w/o
(United Kingdom) JB Ward	6	6	3
(United Kingdom) George Thomas	2	3	0^{r}
(United Kingdom) AR Sawyer	6	6	6
(United States) H Behr	0	2	2
(United Kingdom) Peter Hicks	6	6	8
(United Kingdom) JA Randall	0	2	6

Third round
(United Kingdom) R McNair	2	7	2	3
(United Kingdom) JB Ward	6	5	6	6
(United Kingdom) AR Sawyer	6	6	6
(United Kingdom) P Hicks	2	1	3

Fourth round
(United Kingdom) JB Ward	7	5	8	4	3
(United Kingdom) AR Sawyer	5	7	6	6	6

==== Section 3 ====
First round
(United Kingdom) RH Hotham	6	7	5	6
(United Kingdom) ER Clarke	2	5	7	4
(United Kingdom) Lionel Escombe	6	8	9
(United Kingdom) WP Haviland	1	6	7
(United Kingdom) Percy Fitton	6	6	6
(United Kingdom) Hugh Comyn	1	2	0

Second round
(United Kingdom) Frank Pearce	6	6	8
(United Kingdom) Stanley Franklin	0	2	6
(United Kingdom) F Chesterton
(United Kingdom) Albert Prebble	w/o
(Canada) Robert Powell	8	6	6
(United Kingdom) RH Hotham	6	3	2
(United Kingdom) L Escombe	7	6	6
(United Kingdom) P Fitton	5	2	4

Third round
(United Kingdom) F Pearce	6	6	6
(United Kingdom) F Chesterton	1	2	4
(Canada) R Powell	4	6	4	3
(United Kingdom) L Escombe	6	4	6	6

Fourth round
(United Kingdom) F Pearce	1	2	2
(United Kingdom) L Escombe	6	6	6

==== Section 4 ====
First round
(United Kingdom) Ernest Wills
(United Kingdom) Cecil Hartley	w/o
(United Kingdom) AL Bentley	6	6	6
(United Kingdom) Eustace White	0	1	3
(United Kingdom) TD Stoward	4	6	6	6
(United Kingdom) Ernest Parton	6	3	4	4
(United Kingdom) CHG Mackintosh	6	6	4	6	6
(United Kingdom) Penn Gaskell	0	8	6	3	3
(United Kingdom) Wilberforce Eaves	6	6	6
(United Kingdom) HJW Fosbery	0	2	3
(United Kingdom) Xenophon Casdagli	6	6	6	6
(United Kingdom) EW Timmis	8	3	1	3
(United Kingdom) WS Andrews	6	6	4	6
(United Kingdom) HB Routledge	4	3	6	2
(United Kingdom) Gordon Lowe
(United Kingdom) Alfred Crawley	w/o

Second round
(United Kingdom) E Wills	0	3	1
(United Kingdom) AL Bentley	6	6	6
(United Kingdom) TD Stoward	6	6	6
(United Kingdom) CHG Mackintosh	4	3	0
(United Kingdom) W Eaves	6	6	6
(United Kingdom) X Casdagli	2	4	3
(United Kingdom) WS Andrews	3	1	4
(United Kingdom) G Lowe	6	6	6

Third round
(United Kingdom) AL Bentley	6	6	9
(United Kingdom) TD Stoward	0	2	7
(United Kingdom) W Eaves	8	6	6
(United Kingdom) G Lowe	6	3	0

Fourth round
(United Kingdom) AL Bentley	2	4	6	4
(United Kingdom) W Eaves	6	6	0	6

=== Bottom half ===
==== Section 5 ====
First round
(United Kingdom) John Rendall	2	6	6	1	6
(United Kingdom) Colin Wyllie	6	2	1	6	1
(United Kingdom) James Powell
(United Kingdom) Reginald Punnett	w/o
(United States) Karl Behr	6	6	6	6
(United Kingdom) Theodore Mavrogordato	2	8	4	4
(United Kingdom) Henry Wilson-Fox	6	6	6
(United Kingdom) Charles Simond	4	3	0
(New Zealand) Anthony Wilding	6	8	7
(United States) Beals Wright	2	6	5
(Australia) Norman Brookes	6	6	6
(United Kingdom) JE Boyd	0	1	1
(United Kingdom) Arthur Lowe
(United Kingdom) EP Corlett	w/o
(United Kingdom) PJG Pipon
(United Kingdom) Archdale Palmer	w/o

Second round
(United Kingdom) J Rendall	6	6	6
(United Kingdom) J Powell	1	2	1
(United States) K Behr	6	6	6
(United Kingdom) H Wilson-Fox	2	2	4
(New Zealand) A Wilding	6	2	3	6	3
(Australia) N Brookes	4	6	6	2	6
(United Kingdom) A Lowe	6	6	6
(United Kingdom) PJG Pipon	3	3	4

Third round
(United Kingdom) J Rendall	2	7	6	2
(United States) K Behr	6	9	4	6
(Australia) N Brookes	6	6	6
(United Kingdom) A Lowe	3	2	0

Fourth round
(United States) K Behr	4	2	6	6	1
(Australia) N Brookes	6	6	2	3	6

==== Section 6 ====
First round
(United Kingdom) Henry Pollard	6	6	6
(United Kingdom) R Boucher	4	2	2
(United Kingdom) Alfred Taylor	6	6	6
(United Kingdom) ND Malcolm	3	2	2

Second round
(United Kingdom) H Pollard	10	6	3	6
(United Kingdom) A Taylor	8	0	6	4
(United States) DP Rhodes	6	6	6
(United Kingdom) AG Plante	2	4	0
(United Kingdom) Kenneth Powell	6	6	6
(United Kingdom) EG Levien	2	2	2
(United Kingdom) Sydney Adams
(United Kingdom) JB Dufall	w/o

Third round
(United Kingdom) H Pollard	2	6	4	4
(United States) DP Rhodes	6	2	6	6
(United Kingdom) K Powell	6	2	5	5
(United Kingdom) S Adams	4	6	7	7

Fourth round
(United States) DP Rhodes	6	4	6	2
(United Kingdom) S Adams	8	6	0	6

==== Section 7 ====
First round

Second round
(United Kingdom) Kenneth Ingram	4	6	3	6	4
(United Kingdom) Neville Durlacher	6	3	6	2	2^{r}
(United Kingdom) Fritz Goldberg	6	6	6
(United Kingdom) GR Bennett	1	1	0
(United Kingdom) Major Ritchie	6	6	6
(Austria) Kurt von Wessely	2	0	2
(Austria) Rolf Kinzl	4	6	4	6	6
(United Kingdom) Charles Tuckey	6	4	6	2	4

Third round
(United Kingdom) K Ingram	6	6	2	4	4
(United Kingdom) F Goldberg	2	1	6	6	6
(United Kingdom) M Ritchie	6	6	6
(Austria) R Kinzl	1	4	2

Fourth round
(United Kingdom) F Goldberg	2	0	3
(United Kingdom) M Ritchie	6	6	6

==== Section 8 ====
First round

Second round
(United Kingdom) EP Corlett
(United Kingdom) T Jones	w/o
(United Kingdom) E Morris Hall	6	6	2	4	6
(United Kingdom) Arthur Cronin	3	1	6	6	1
(United Kingdom) Walter Crawley	6	6	6
(United Kingdom) GW Pratt	3	1	2
(Germany) Oscar Kreuzer	6	6	7
(United Kingdom) Percival Davson	3	4	5

Third round
(United Kingdom) EP Corlett	7	6	6
(United Kingdom) E Morris Hall	5	1	3
(United Kingdom) W Crawley	3	4	4
(Germany) O Kreuzer	6	6	6

Fourth round
(United Kingdom) EP Corlett	1	4	1
(Germany) O Kreuzer	6	6	6

Preceded by 1906 Australasian Championships – Men's singles	Grand Slam men's singles	Succeeded by 1908 U.S. National Championships – Men's singles
