= 1907 Wimbledon Championships =

- Date: 24 June – 5 July
- Edition: 31st
- Category: Grand Slam
- Surface: Grass
- Location: Worple Road; SW19, Wimbledon, London, United Kingdom
- Venue: All England Lawn Tennis and Croquet Club

Champions

Men's singles
- (Australia) Norman Brookes

Women's singles
- (United States) May Sutton

Men's doubles
- (Australia) Norman Brookes / (New Zealand) Anthony Wilding
- Wimbledon Championships

The 1907 Wimbledon Championships took place on the outdoor grass courts at the All England Lawn Tennis and Croquet Club in Wimbledon, London, United Kingdom. The tournament ran from 24 June until 5 July. It was the 31st staging of the Wimbledon Championships, and the first Grand Slam tennis event of 1907.

The Prince and Princess of Wales (the future George V and Queen Mary) came as spectators. The Centre Court was protected by a tarpaulin cover for the first time.

== Champions ==
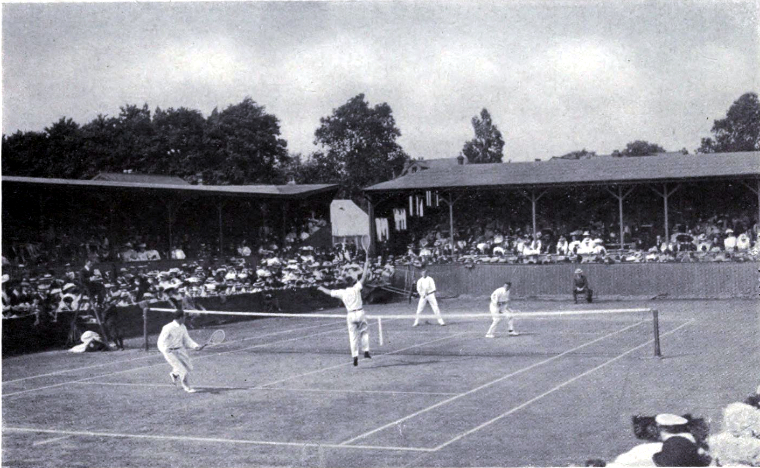
Wimbledon 1907 Men's doubles final

=== Men's singles ===
(Australia) Norman Brookes defeated (United Kingdom of Great Britain and Ireland) Arthur Gore, 6–4, 6–2, 6–2

=== Women's singles ===
(United States) May Sutton defeated (United Kingdom of Great Britain and Ireland) Dorothea Lambert Chambers, 6–1, 6–4

=== Men's doubles ===
(Australia) Norman Brookes / (New Zealand) Anthony Wilding defeated (United States) Karl Behr / (United States) Beals Wright, 6–4, 6–4, 6–2

Preceded by 1906 Australasian Championships	Grand Slams	Succeeded by 1907 Australasian Championships
