= J. L. O'Dea =

Australian tennis player

J. L. Odea
- Country (sports): Australia
- Born: 1884

Singles

Grand Slam singles results
- Australian Open: 2R (1920)

Doubles

Grand Slam doubles results
- Australian Open: F (1910)

J.L. Odea (born 1884) was a male doubles tennis player.

Odea was the men's doubles champion runner-up at the inaugural Australasian Championships in 1910 with Rodney Heath.

== Grand Slam finals ==
=== Doubles: (1 runner-up) ===
Result	Year	Championship	Surface	Partner	Opponents	Score
Loss	1910	Australasian Championships	Grass	(Australia) Rodney Heath	(Australia) Ashley Campbell (Australia) Horace Rice	3–6, 3–6, 2–6
