= 1923 Australasian Championships – Men's singles =

Men's singles
- 1923 Australasian Championships

Final
- Champion: (Australia) Pat O'Hara Wood
- Runner-up: (Australia) Bert St. John
- Score: 6–1, 6–1, 6–3

Details
- Draw: 19
- Seeds: –

Events
| Singles | men | women |
| Doubles | men | women | mixed |
- Australasian Championships

Pat O'Hara Wood defeated Bert St. John 6–1, 6–1, 6–3 in the final to win the men's singles tennis title at the 1923 Australian Championships.

== Draw ==
=== Key ===
- Q = Qualifier
- WC = Wild card
- LL = Lucky loser
- r = Retired

Quarterfinals
(Australia) Pat O'Hara Wood | 6 | 6 | 6
(Australia) F.J. Cory | 0 | 4 | 1
(Australia) E. Jordan | 5 | 3 | 6 | 6 | 7
(Australia) L. Oxenham | 7 | 6 | 3 | 4 | 5
(Australia) Horace Rice | 6 | 6 | 6
(Australia) C. Ferguson | 2 | 2 | 2
(Australia) Dudley Bullough | 4 | 2 | 2
(Australia) Bert St. John | 6 | 6 | 6

Semifinals
(Australia) Pat O'Hara Wood | 6 | 6 | 6
(Australia) E. Jordan | 1 | 1 | 1
(Australia) Horace Rice | 7 | 6 | 5 | 3
(Australia) Bert St. John | 9 | 3 | 7 | 6

Finals
(Australia) Pat O'Hara Wood | 6 | 6 | 6
(Australia) Bert St. John | 1 | 1 | 3

=== Top half ===
First round
(Australia) E. Jordan | 8 | 6 | 6
(Australia) C. Moon | 6 | 2 | 2
(Australia) H.M. Turner | 6 | 6 | 6
(Australia) Nelson | 3 | 1 | 3

Second round
(Australia) P. O'Hara Wood | 6 | 6 | 6
(Australia) W. Smith | 1 | 2 | 1
(Australia) F.J. Cory | 6 | 6 | 6
(Australia) Wormall | 2 | 2 | 4
(Australia) E. Jordan | 6 | 8 | 6
(Australia) H. Turner | 1 | 6 | 2
(Australia) L. Oxenham | bye

Quarterfinals
(Australia) P. O'Hara Wood | 6 | 6 | 6
(Australia) F.J. Cory | 0 | 4 | 1
(Australia) E. Jordan | 5 | 3 | 6 | 6 | 7
(Australia) L. Oxenham | 7 | 6 | 3 | 4 | 5

Semifinals
(Australia) P. O'Hara Wood | 6 | 6 | 6
(Australia) E. Jordan | 1 | 1 | 1

=== Bottom half ===
First round
(Australia) H. Rice | 7 | 6 | 4 | 6
(Australia) L. Terry | 5 | 2 | 6 | 1
(Australia) L. Plane | 6 | 6 | 6
(Australia) A. North | 4 | 4 | 1

Second round
(Australia) H. Rice | 4 | 6 | 6 | 7
(Australia) L. Plane | 6 | 0 | 4 | 5
(Australia) C. Ferguson | 6 | 1 | 7 | 6
(Australia) N. Green | 1 | 6 | 5 | 2
(Australia) D. Bullough | 7 | 6 | 7
(Australia) A. Illingworth | 5 | 2 | 5
(Australia) C. B. St. John | 6 | 6 | 6
(Australia) Ferrier | 0 | 2 | 4

Quarterfinals
(Australia) H. Rice | 6 | 6 | 6
(Australia) C. Ferguson | 2 | 2 | 2
(Australia) D. Bullough | 4 | 2 | 2
(Australia) C. B. St. John | 6 | 6 | 6

Semifinals
(Australia) H. Rice | 7 | 6 | 5 | 3
(Australia) C. B. St. John | 9 | 3 | 7 | 6

== See also ==
- 1923 Australasian Championships – Women's singles

| Preceded by 1922 U.S. National Championships | Grand Slam men's singles | Succeeded by 1923 Wimbledon Championships |
