= Karl Behr =

American tennis player and banker

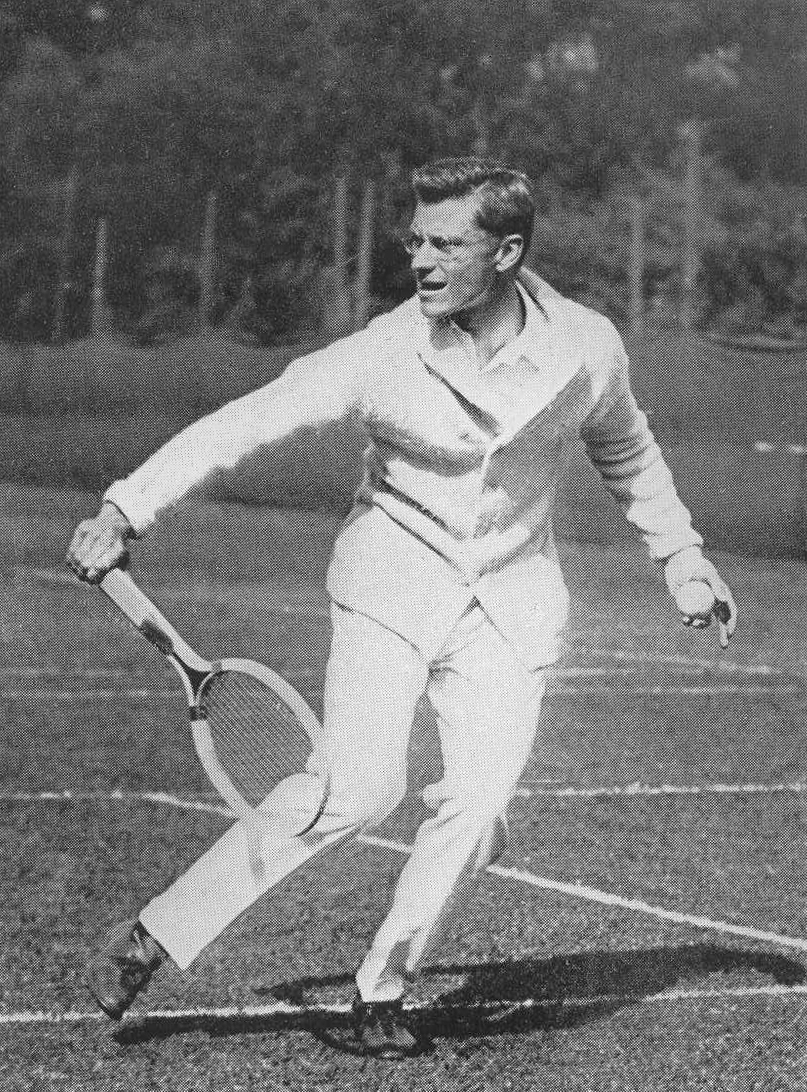
- Full name: Karl Howell Behr
- Country (sports): United States
- Born: May 30, 1885 New York City, New York, United States
- Died: October 15, 1949 (aged 64) Morristown, New Jersey, United States
- Plays: Right-handed (one-handed backhand)
- College: Yale and the Lawrenceville school
- Int. Tennis HoF: 1969 (member page)

Grand Slam singles results
- Wimbledon: 4R (1907)
- US Open: F (1906^{AC})

Grand Slam doubles results
- Wimbledon: F (1907^{AC})

Team competitions
- Davis Cup: F (1907)

Karl Howell Behr (May 30, 1885 – October 15, 1949) was an American tennis player and banker. He was also a survivor of the sinking of RMS Titanic.

== Personal life ==
Karl Howell Behr was born the son of Herman and Grace (née Howell) Behr of New York City. He was the brother of Max H. Behr, the famous golfer. Behr was educated at Lawrenceville School and attended Yale University and was admitted to the bar association in 1910. While at Yale he also played on the ice hockey team for three years.

Behr married Helen Monypeny Newsom on March 1, 1913, at the Church of the Transfiguration in New York City. The couple had four children together: Karl H. Behr Jr. (1914–2002), Peter Howell Behr (1915–1997), James Howell Behr (1920–1976), and Sally Howell Behr (later Mrs. Samuel Leonard Pettit) (1928–1995). After her husband's death, Helen remarried one of his best friends and former tennis partners, Dean Mathey.

Behr gave up a career in law, instead turning to banking. He was vice-president of Dillon, Read & Co. and sat on the board of the Fisk Rubber Company, the Goodyear Tire and Rubber Company, and the National Cash Register Company. At the time of his death, he was a director of the Interchemical Corporation, the Behr-Manning Corporation of Troy, New York, and the Witherbee Sherman Corporation. His clubs included the Downtown, university and Yale, and the St. Nicholas Society.

He was a cousin of fellow tennis player Allen Behr.

== Tennis career ==
Behr was also a well known lawn tennis player, playing on the United States Davis Cup team in 1907. Behr, with Beals Wright, was also runner up in the men's doubles at the 1907 Wimbledon Championships, losing to Norman Brookes and Tony Wilding in three sets, 4–6, 4–6, 2–6.

He reached the No. 3 U.S. ranking in both 1907 and 1914.

Behr continued his tennis career after the sinking of Titanic (see below), and was named to the 1914 U.S. Davis Cup team along with fellow survivor R. Norris Williams. However, Behr, who played on the 1907 U.S. Davis Cup, did not play in the 1914 Davis Cup Challenge Round against Australasia at Forest Hills. In 1915 he defeated Maurice McLoughlin, the world's no. 1 ranked player at the time, in straight sets, 8–6, 7–5, 7–5 to win the tournament in Seabright, New Jersey.

== Grand Slam finals ==
=== Doubles (1 runner-up) ===
Result	Year	Championship	Surface	Partner	Opponents	Score
Loss	1907	Wimbledon	Grass	(United States) Beals Wright	(Australia) Norman Brookes (New Zealand) Anthony Wilding	4–6, 4–6, 2–6

== RMS Titanic ==
In 1912, Behr booked first class passage on board RMS Titanic in pursuit of fellow first class passenger Helen Newsom, who was a friend of Behr's sister. Behr occupied cabin C-148 during the voyage.

Sometime after the ship hit the iceberg, Behr met up with Helen, her mother and stepfather, Richard and Sallie Beckwith; and another couple, Edwin and Gertrude Kimball, on the boat deck. Under the watch of Third Officer Herbert Pitman, the group gathered around lifeboat 5. Gertrude Kimball asked J. Bruce Ismay if all of their group could enter the boat. Ismay replied, "Of course, madam, every one of you." As a result, Behr and his friends were rescued in lifeboat 5, the second boat to leave the ship. After the rescue, several newspapers reported that Behr had proposed to Miss Newsom in the lifeboat.

While aboard the rescue ship, RMS Carpathia, Behr and several other passengers, including Molly Brown, organized and formed a committee to honor the bravery of Carpathia's captain, Arthur Rostron, and the ship's crew. They later presented an inscribed silver cup to Rostron, and medals to each of the ship's 320 crew.

== Death ==
Behr died of cancer at his home on October 15, 1949, aged 64. He was buried at the Evergreen Cemetery in Morristown, New Jersey. He was posthumously honored by the International Tennis Hall of Fame in 1969.
