= Ashley Campbell (tennis) =

Australian tennis player

- Country (sports): Australia
- Born: 29 September 1880; Sydney, New South Wales
- Died: 5 July 1943 (aged 62); East St Kilda, Victoria
- College: Newington College

Doubles

Grand Slam doubles results
- Australian Open: W (1910, 1914)

Ashley De Vere Campbell (29 September 1880 – 5 July 1943) was an Australian male tennis player who was active before World War I. He was born in Sydney and attended Newington College (1893–1898) where he was a noted cricketer. Campbell didn't play tennis until the age of eighteen and his game was heavily influenced by David Edwards who was a fellow Old Newingtonian. Campbell moved to Melbourne in 1903 and was winner of the 1910 and 1914 Australasian men's doubles championships. From 1929 until 1939 he lived in Europe, having been an executive of the Colonial Sugar Refining Company in Australia and New Zealand. Campbell became secretary of the Free French movement in Victoria, and was secretary of the Red Cross and an active member of the Alliance Française. He died in a hospital in East St Kilda, Victoria.

== Grand Slam finals ==
=== Doubles: (2 titles) ===
Result	Year	Championship	Surface	Partner	Opponents	Score
Win	1910	Australasian Championships	Grass	(Australia) Horace Rice	(Australia) Rodney Heath (Australia) James O'Dea	6–3, 6–3, 6–2
Win	1914	Australasian Championships	Grass	(Australia) Gerald Patterson	(Australia) Rodney Heath (Australia) Arthur O'Hara Wood	7–5, 3–6, 6–3, 6–3
