= Rodney Heath =

Australian tennis player

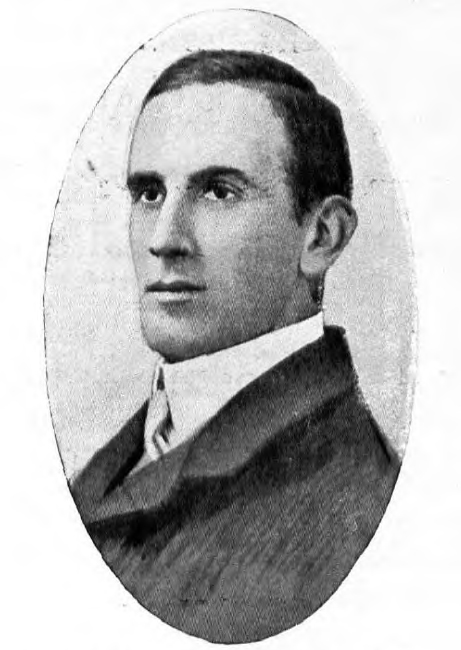
- Full name: Rodney Wilfred Heath
- Country (sports): Australia
- Born: 15 June 1884 Melbourne, Australia
- Died: 26 October 1936 (aged 52) Melbourne, Australia
- Plays: Right-handed (one-handed backhand)

Singles
- Career record: 133–61 (68.5%)
- Career titles: 9

Grand Slam singles results
- Australian Open: W (1905, 1910)
- French Open: 1R (1925)
- Wimbledon: QF (1911)

Doubles

Grand Slam doubles results
- Australian Open: W (1906, 1911)
- Wimbledon: F (1919)

Team competitions
- Davis Cup: W (1911)

Rodney Wilfred Heath (15 June 1884 – 26 October 1936) was an Australian tennis player.

== Personal ==
Heath was the second son of F. W. Heath who was the official timekeeper at the Victorian Racing Club and Victorian Amateur Turf Club. Rodney's brother C. V. Heath won the South Australian men's singles title in 1902. In June 1915 Heath left Australia to join the Royal Flying Corps in England. He was promoted to the rank of major two years later. In 1916 Heath was injured when he crash-landed his plane after flying into a snowstorm en route from England to France.

== Tennis career ==
Heath was the Men's Singles champion at the inaugural Australasian Championships in 1905 defeating Albert Curtis in four sets. He won again it five years later, in 1910, after a victory in the final against Horace Rice in three straight sets.

In 1911 he played in the Davis Cup challenge round in New Zealand against the United States and defeated William Larned in four sets.

In 1919 he reached the final of the Wimbledon Men's Doubles tournament with Randolph Lycett.

== Death ==
On 26 October 1936, 9 months before his 53rd birthday, Heath was found dead in the bedroom of his sister's home in Melbourne, Australia. It is said that Heath died from melanoma in his stomach.

== Grand Slam finals ==
=== Singles (2 titles) ===
Result	Year	Championship	Surface	Opponent	Score
Win	1905	Australasian Championships	Grass	(Australia) Arthur Curtis	4–6, 6–3, 6–4, 6–4
Win	1910	Australasian Championships	Grass	(Australia) Horace Rice	6–4, 6–3, 6–2

=== Doubles: 5 (2 titles, 3 runners-up) ===
Result	Year	Championship	Surface	Partner	Opponents	Score
Win	1906	Australasian Championships	Grass	(Australia) Anthony Wilding	(Australia) Cecil C. Cox (New Zealand) Harry Parker	6–2, 6–4, 6–2
Loss	1910	Australasian Championships	Grass	(Australia) James O'Dea	(Australia) Ashley Campbell (Australia) Horace Rice	3–6, 3–6, 2–6
Win	1911	Australasian Championships	Grass	(United Kingdom) Randolph Lycett	(Australia) John Addison (Australia) Norman Brookes	6–2, 7–5, 6–0
Loss	1914	Australasian Championships	Grass	(United Kingdom) Arthur O'Hara Wood	(Australia) Ashley Campbell (Australia) Gerald Patterson	5–7, 6–3, 3–6, 3–6
Loss	1919	Wimbledon	Grass	(United Kingdom) Randolph Lycett	(Australia) Pat O'Hara-Wood (Australia) Ronald Thomas	4–6, 2–6, 6–4, 2–6
