= Clarence Todd (tennis) =

Australian tennis player

- Full name: Clarence Vernon Todd
- Country (sports): Australia
- Born: 17 May 1892; Trundle, New South Wales, Australia
- Died: 30 March 1973 (aged 80); Southport, Queensland, Australia
- Turned pro: 1912 (amateur tour)
- Retired: 1922

Singles

Grand Slam singles results
- Australian Open: SF (1915)
- US Open: 2R (1921)

Doubles

Grand Slam doubles results
- Australian Open: W (1915)

Clarence Todd (1892–1973) was an Australian tennis player. A farmer by profession, he was born in Trundle, in rural New South Wales, in 1892. Todd was a good volleyer and he always tried to get to the net as soon as he could in rallies. Todd reached the semi-finals of the 1915 Australasian Championships (losing to Horace Rice). He also won the men's doubles with Rice. From 1916-17 Todd served during World War 1 and was badly injured in the leg when advancing against machine gun fire at the battle of Messines. He lost his first match at 1919 Australasian Championships to Allan North. In 1921 Todd lost in round two of the U. S. Championships to Willis Davis. He played Davis Cup in 1921. He later moved to Queensland.

== Grand Slam finals ==
=== Doubles: 1 title ===
| Result | Year | Championship | Surface | Partner | Opponents | Score |
|---|---|---|---|---|---|---|
| Win | 1915 | Australasian Championships | Grass | (Australia) Horace Rice | (United Kingdom) Gordon Lowe (Australia) Bert St. John | 8–6, 6–4, 7–9, 6–3 |
