= 1923 Australasian Championships – Women's singles =

Women's singles
- 1923 Australasian Championships

Final
- Champion: (Australia) Mall Molesworth
- Runner-up: (Australia) Esna Boyd
- Score: 6–1, 7–5

Events
Singles	men	women		boys	girls
Doubles	men	women	mixed	boys	girls
← 1922 ·	Australasian Championships	· 1924 →

Mall Molesworth defeated Esna Boyd 6–1, 7–5 in the final to win the women's singles tennis title at the 1923 Australian Championships.

== Draw ==
=== Key ===
- Q = Qualifier
- WC = Wild card
- LL = Lucky loser
- Alt = Alternate
- SE = Special exempt
- PR = Protected ranking
- ITF = ITF entry
- JE = Junior exempt
- w/o = Walkover
- r = Retired
- d = Defaulted
- SR = Special ranking

=== Finals ===
1st round
(Australia) Mitchell	6	6
(Australia) K Rosser	3	4
(Australia) Haymen	6	7
(Australia) H Turner	2	5
(Australia) J Watson	10	6
(Australia) Floris St. George	8	1
(Australia) Roe	6	10
(Australia) K Irving	2	8
(Australia) Sylvia Lance	6	6
(Australia) Docker	3	1

2nd round
(Australia) Esna Boyd	6	6
(Australia) Mitchell	1	3
(Australia) Haymen	7	8
(Australia) J Watson	5	6
(Australia) Roe	0	4
(Australia) Sylvia Lance	6	6
(Australia) A Bell	2	1
(Australia) Mall Molesworth	6	6

Semifinals
(Australia) Esna Boyd	6	6
(Australia) Haymen	2	2
(Australia) Sylvia Lance	6	4	6
(Australia) Mall Molesworth	3	6	8

Final
(Australia) Esna Boyd	1	5
(Australia) Mall Molesworth	6	7

Preceded by 1922 U.S. National Championships – Women's singles	Grand Slam women's singles	Succeeded by 1923 Wimbledon Championships – Women's singles
