= Gordon Lowe =

British tennis player (1884-1972)

Sir Francis Gordon Lowe 2nd Baronet
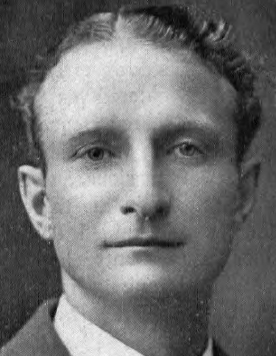
- Born: 21 June 1884; Edgbaston, Great Britain
- Died: 17 May 1972 (aged 87); London, Great Britain
- Father: Sir Francis Lowe, 1st Baronet
- Relatives: Arthur Lowe (brother); John Lowe (brother)
- Tennis career
- Country (sports): United Kingdom
- Plays: Right-handed (one-handed backhand)

Singles
- Career record: 672–176 (79.2%)
- Career titles: 82
- Highest ranking: No. 8 (1914, A. Wallis Myers)

Grand Slam singles results
- Australian Open: W (1915)
- Wimbledon: SF (1911, 1923)
- US Open: QF (1921)

Other tournaments
- WHCC: 3R (1914)
- WCCC: W (1920)

Doubles

Grand Slam doubles results
- Australian Open: F (1912, 1915)
- Wimbledon: F (1921)

Sir Francis Gordon Lowe, 2nd Baronet (21 June 1884 – 17 May 1972) was a British male tennis player.

Lowe is best remembered for winning the Australasian Championships in 1915 (where he beat champion Horace Rice in the final). and for winning the World Covered Court Championships (Indoor) in 1920. Lowe also won Queen's Club in 1912, 1913 and 1925. His father, Sir Francis Lowe, 1st Baronet, was a Member of Parliament, representing Birmingham Edgbaston. In 1929 Lowe became Sir Gordon Lowe, succeeding his father to the baronetcy. Gordon's brother Arthur Lowe was also a tennis player and another brother, John, played first-class cricket.

He was ranked World No. 8 in 1914 by A. Wallis Myers of The Daily Telegraph.

In 1910 he won the singles title at the British Covered Court Championships, played at the Queen's Club in London, defeating his brother Arthur in the final in three straight sets. He won the singles title at Monte Carlo three times, in 1920, 1921, 1923 and the South of France Championships in 1923. He also competed at the 1912 Summer Olympics and the 1920 Summer Olympics.

From 1932 to 1936 he was the editor of the Lowe's Lawn Tennis Annual.

== Grand Slam finals ==
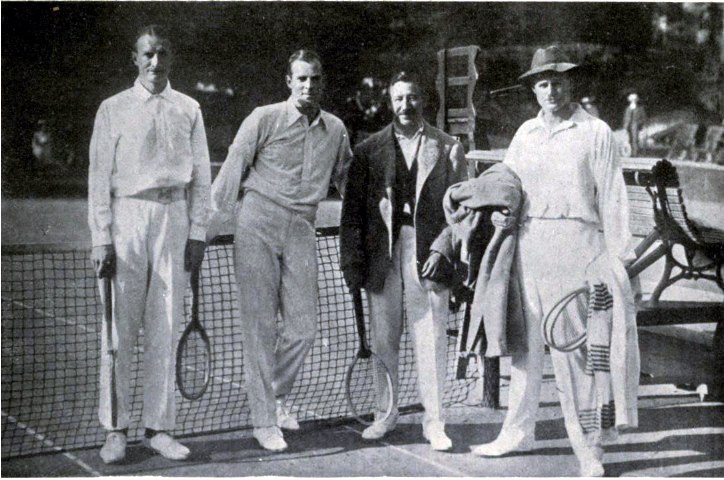
Lowe (left) at Cannes, 1914

=== Singles (1 title) ===
Result	Year	Championship	Surface	Opponent	Score
Win	1915	Australasian Championships	Grass	(Australia) Horace Rice	4–6, 6–1, 6–2, 6–4

=== Doubles (3 runner-ups) ===
Result	Year	Championship	Surface	Partner	Opponents	Score
Loss	1912	Australasian Championships	Grass	(United Kingdom) Alfred Beamish	(United Kingdom) James Cecil Parke (United Kingdom) Charles Dixon	4–6, 4–6, 2–6
Loss	1915	Australasian Championships	Grass	(Australia) Bert St. John	(Australia) Horace Rice (Australia) Clarence V. Todd	6–8, 4–6, 9–7, 3–6
Loss	1921	Wimbledon	Grass	(United Kingdom of Great Britain and Ireland) Arthur Lowe	(United Kingdom of Great Britain and Ireland) Randolph Lycett (United Kingdom of Great Britain and Ireland) Max Woosnam	3–6, 0–6, 5–7

== Personal life ==
Lowe served in the First World War with the British Indian Army in Mesopotamia from 1916 to 1919.

Baronetage of the United Kingdom
Preceded by Francis Lowe	Baronet (of Edgbaston); 1929–1972	Succeeded by Francis Lowe
