= Harry Parker (tennis) =

New Zealand tennis player

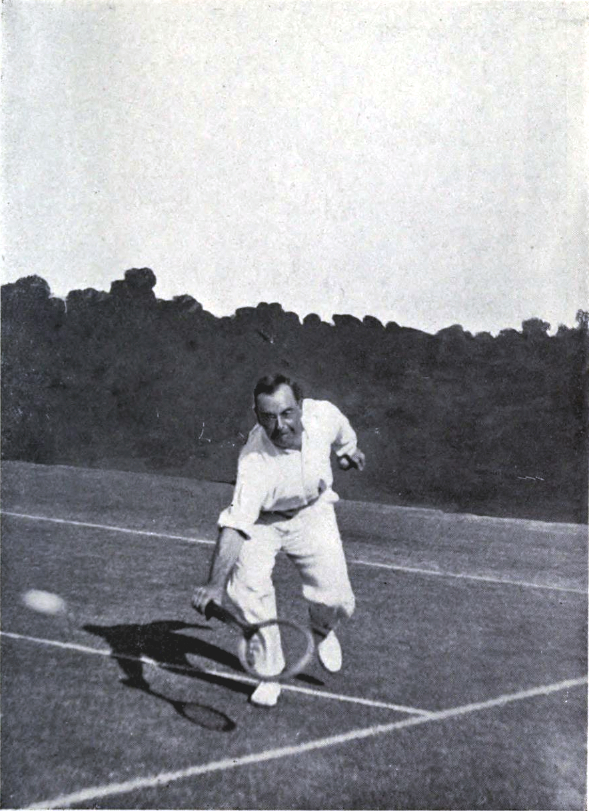
- Full name: Harry Alabaster Parker
- Country (sports): New Zealand
- Born: 6 May 1873 Christchurch, New Zealand
- Died: 14 May 1961 (aged 88) Balgowlah, Sydney, Australia
- Turned pro: 1894 (amateur tour)
- Retired: 1915

Singles
- Career record: 277-67 (80.52%)
- Career titles: 40

Grand Slam singles results
- Australian Open: F (1907, 1913)
- Wimbledon: 4R (1905)
- US Open: 4R (1918)

Doubles

Grand Slam doubles results
- Australian Open: W (1907)
- Wimbledon: F (1909)

Harry Alabaster Parker was a New Zealand tennis player. He was active from 1894 to 1915 and won 40 career singles titles.

Parker won the doubles title at the Australasian Championships, the future Australian Open, alongside Bill Gregg in 1907. He also reached two singles finals at the Australasian Championships in 1907 and 1913, and two doubles finals in 1906 and 1913. He reached the Wimbledon Championships doubles final, alongside Stanley Doust in 1909, and the quarter-finals alongside Anthony Wilding in 1905.

== Grand Slam finals ==
=== Singles (2 runners-up) ===
Result	Year	Championship	Surface	Opponent	Score
Loss	1907	Australasian Championships	Grass	(Australia) Horace Rice	3–6, 4–6, 4–6
Loss	1913	Australasian Championships	Grass	(Australia) Ernie Parker	6–2, 1–6, 3–6, 2–6

=== Doubles (1 title, 3 runners-up) ===
Result	Year	Championship	Surface	Partner	Opponents	Score
Loss	1906	Australasian Championships	Grass	(Australia) C. Cox	(Australia) Rodney Heath (New Zealand) Anthony Wilding	2–6, 4–6, 2–6
Win	1907	Australasian Championships	Grass	(Australia) Bill Gregg	(Australia) Horace Rice (New Zealand) Gordon Wright	6–2, 3–6, 6–2, 6–2
Loss	1909	Wimbledon Championships	Grass	(Australia) Stanley Doust	(United Kingdom) Herbert Roper Barrett (United Kingdom) Arthur Gore	6-2, 6–1, 6-4
Loss	1913	Australasian Championships	Grass	(Australia) Ray Taylor	(Australia) Ernie Parker (Australia) Alf Hedeman	6–8, 6–4, 4–6, 4–6
