= Bert St. John =

Australian tennis player

- Full name: Cecil Bertram Vernon St John
- Country (sports): Australia
- Born: 28 July 1879; Queensland, Australia
- Died: 19 September 1932 (aged 53); Queensland, Australia

Singles

Grand Slam singles results
- Australian Open: F (1923)

Doubles

Grand Slam doubles results
- Australian Open: W (1923)

Mixed doubles

Grand Slam mixed doubles results
- Australian Open: F (1923)

Cecil Bertram Vernon St John (28 July 1879 – 19 September 1932) was an Australian tennis player. He also represented Queensland in rugby union.

St. John won the doubles title alongside Pat O'Hara Wood at the Australasian Championships, the future Australian Open, in 1923, and reached three more finals at the tournament, losing in singles to Pat O'Hara Wood in 1923, in doubles alongside Gordon Lowe in 1915, and in mixed doubles alongside Margaret Molesworth in 1923.

He is the only player to have reached a major tournament final, in singles or doubles, with only one hand.

== Grand Slam finals ==
=== Singles (1 runner-up) ===
Result	Year	Championship	Surface	Opponent	Score
Loss	1923	Australasian Championships	Grass	(Australia) Pat O'Hara Wood	1–6, 1–6, 3–6

=== Doubles (1 title, 1 runner-up) ===
Result	Year	Championship	Surface	Partner	Opponents	Score
Loss	1915	Australasian Championships	Grass	(United Kingdom) Gordon Lowe	(Australia) Clarence Todd (Australia) Horace Rice	6–8, 4–6, 9–7, 3–6
Win	1923	Australasian Championships	Grass	(Australia) Pat O'Hara Wood	(Australia) Dudley Bullough (Australia) Horace Rice	6–4, 6–3, 3–6, 6–0

=== Mixed doubles (1 runner-up) ===
Result	Year	Championship	Surface	Partner	Opponents	Score
Loss	1923	Australasian Championships	Grass	(Australia) Margaret Molesworth	(Australia) Sylvia Lance Harper (Australia) Horace Rice	6–2, 4–6, 4–6
