= Horace Rice =

Australian tennis player (1872–1950)

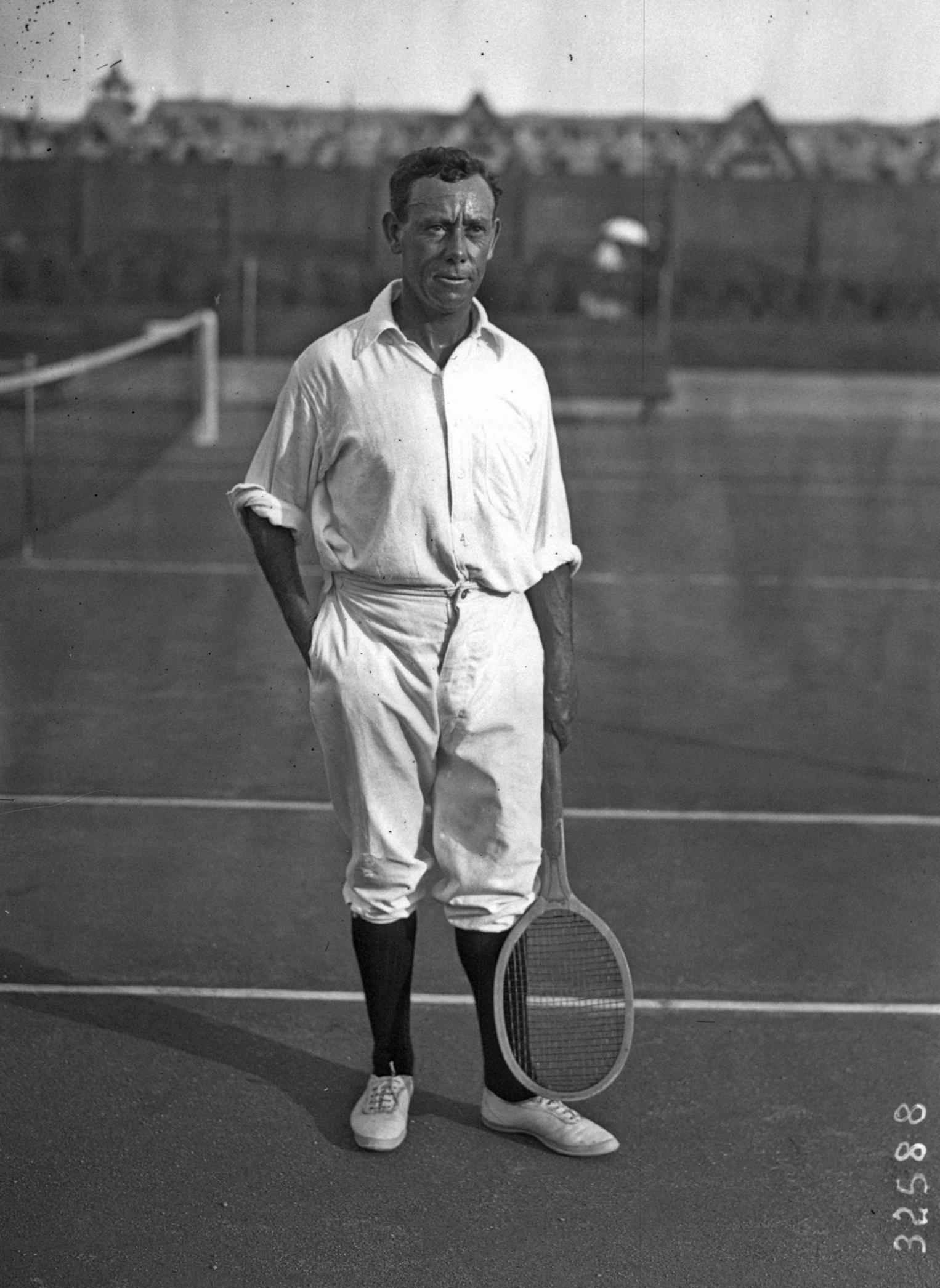
- Rice in 1913
- Country (sports): Australia
- Born: 5 September 1872 Sydney, New South Wales, Australia
- Died: 18 January 1950 (aged 77) Roseville, New South Wales, Australia
- Plays: Left-handed (one-handed backhand)

Singles
- Career record: 284–129 (68.7%)
- Career titles: 26

Grand Slam singles results
- Australian Open: W (1907)
- Wimbledon: 2R (1913)

Grand Slam doubles results
- Australian Open: W (1910, 1915)
- Wimbledon: 2R (1913)

Grand Slam mixed doubles results
- Australian Open: W (1923)

Team competitions
- Davis Cup: QF (1913)

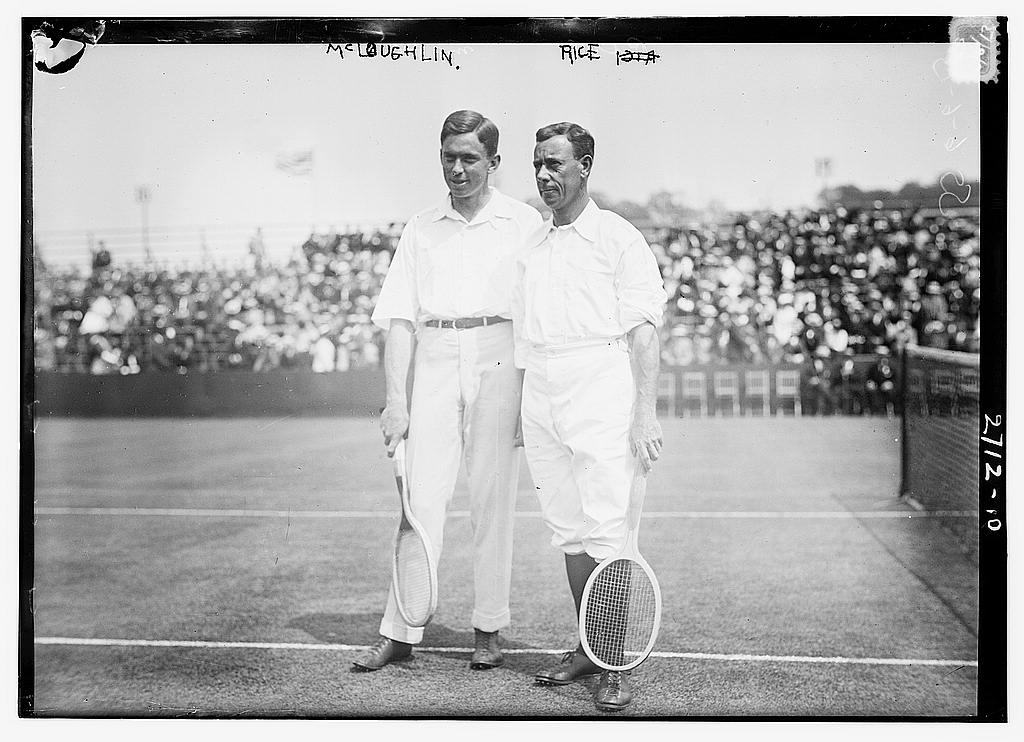
McLoughlin and Rice during the quarter-finals of the 1913 International Lawn Tennis Challenge

Horace Michael Rice (5 September 1872 – 18 January 1950) was an Australian tennis player.

The left-handed Rice, who played in knickerbockers and long black socks, won the Men's Singles title at the 1907 Australasian Championships, beating Harry Parker in the final. Parker, with his "ever varying placing strokes kept his opponent flying about from side to side of the court and from the net to base line. This, however, had little effect upon Rice, whose staying powers were remarkable, and whose returns almost always were sure and accurate". He was also runner-up at the Australasian championships 3 times (in 1910, 1911 and 1915). He reached the semi finals in 1920 aged 47 and faced Ron Thomas. Rice was 2 sets to 1 down, 5-2 down and faced two match points on Thomas' serve, before staging a comeback to force a fifth set, before eventually losing. He reached the semi finals again in 1923 aged 50 but on a hot day lost in four sets to Bert St. John. He won the Men's Doubles title at the 1915 Championships, partnering Clarence Todd.

== Grand Slam finals ==
=== Singles (1 title, 3 runner-ups) ===
Result	Year	Championship	Surface	Opponent	Score
Win	1907	Australasian Championships	Grass	(New Zealand) Harry Parker	6–3, 6–4, 6–4
Loss	1910	Australasian Championships	Grass	(Australia) Rodney Heath	4–6, 3–6, 3–6
Loss	1911	Australasian Championships	Grass	(Australia) Norman Brookes	2–6, 3–6, 3–6
Loss	1915	Australasian Championships	Grass	(United Kingdom) Gordon Lowe	6–4, 1–6, 2–6, 4–6

=== Doubles: (2 titles, 3 runner-ups) ===
Result	Year	Championship	Surface	Partner	Opponents	Score
Loss	1907	Australasian Championships	Grass	(Australia) George Wright	(Australia) William Gregg (New Zealand) Harry Parker	2–6, 6–2, 2–6, 2–6
Win	1910	Australasian Championships	Grass	(Australia) Ashley Campbell	(Australia) Rodney Heath (Australia) James O'Dea	6–3, 6–3, 6–2
Win	1915	Australasian Championships	Grass	(Australia) Clarence Todd	(United Kingdom) Gordon Lowe (Australia) Bert St. John	8–6, 6–4, 7–9, 6–3
Loss	1920	Australasian Championships	Grass	(Australia) Roy Taylor	(Australia) Pat O'Hara Wood (Australia) Ronald Thomas	1–6, 0–6, 5–7
Loss	1923	Australasian Championships	Grass	(Australia) Dudley Bullough	(Australia) Pat O'Hara Wood (Australia) Bert St. John	4–6, 3–6, 6–3, 0–6

=== Mixed doubles: (1 title) ===
Result	Year	Championship	Surface	Partner	Opponents	Score
Win	1923	Australasian Championships	Grass	(Australia) Sylvia Lance Harper	(Australia) Margaret Molesworth (Australia) Bert St. John	2–6, 6–4, 6–4

At the time of winning his last Grand Slam title and his only one mixed doubles title (on 18 August 1923), he was 50 years and 347 days, which is the all-time record for men in tennis history.

== Family ==
Rice's brother William Rice, was a violist with J. C. Williamson's orchestra, and husband of leading dancer Minnie Everett.

All brothers were keen and able sportsmen.

The Rice family then lived in Paddington very handy to the Association Cricket Ground, now known by the more distinctive name of the Sydney Cricket Ground. Mr. Rice, senior, the head of the family, was a handsome man of middle height. He had the head of a musical genius, as indeed he was, and the air of one who loved things worth cherishing. As one of Sydney's leading conductors and musicians, his sons naturally took after him — for they were all violinists prominent in professional musical circles. The Rice brothers were closely allied with the theatrical profession, and for that reason, perhaps, had more time during the day to devote to their games than most young men. The most prominent lawn tennis player among the brothers was Horace, the little left-hander, who had a particularly good back-hand. He always played in knickers and was so natty and active and pleasant on the courts, that one could never forget him. Horace Rice became an institution in the game in his best seasons. Year after year he represented New South Wales, and even when well past his prime as a player, he was able to hold his own with younger men. 'Horrie' to everyone, he became known right round the world, for he was a Davis Cup representative of Australia against America in New York in 1913. He might have developed into very fine cricketer had he given closer attention and more time to that game, for he was a natural right-hand batsman, a smart field, and he could bowl a good ball left-hand. At the time of his retirement he had taken part in a greater number of representative lawn tennis matches, for his State than any other Australian. Horace Rice held the championships of Australasia, N.S. Wales, Victoria, South Australia, Queensland, Western Australia, Scotland and Ireland. So you may imagine that he travelled a bit in his day. Perhaps the true reason why bat and ball did not hold him was that being a violinist the risk of injury to his fingers was too great — though no one enjoyed a social game of cricket more than he did. He still enjoys his week-end tennis with the best of them, and looks quite a hard-conditioned athlete. The eldest of the Rice boys was Herbert, who followed In his father's footsteps and remained in the musical profession. He was a good lawn tennis player and followed the game for its pleasure at his home in Killara. William Rice built in a bigger physical mould than Horace, was a right-hander. He also was a capital tennis player. In cricket he was quite good, a stylish, right-hand batsman against whom it was no joke to bowl in the Theatrical versus Press cricket matches of years ago. He died a few years ago. Edgar Rice, the youngest of the brothers, one occasionally sees still having his game on the Sydney Cricket Ground courts. In point of skill he was second only to Horace.
