= List of Australian Open men's singles champions =

Australian Open men's singles champions
- Location: Melbourne; Australia
- Venue: Melbourne Park
- Governing body: Tennis Australia
- Created: 1905
- Editions: 114 (2026); 58 (Open Era)
- Surface: Grass (1905–1987); Hard (1988–present); Rebound Ace (1988–2007); Plexicushion (2008–2019); GreenSet (2020–present)
- Prize money: A$ $3,500,000 (2025)
- Trophy: Norman Brookes Challenge Cup
- Website: australianopen.com

Most titles
- Amateur era: 6: Roy Emerson
- Open era: 10: Novak Djokovic

Most consecutive titles
- Amateur era: 5: Roy Emerson
- Open era: 3: Novak Djokovic

Current champion
- Carlos Alcaraz (1st title)

The Australian Open (Note: Known as the Australasian Championships (1905–1926) and as the Australian Championships (1927–1968) during the Amateur Era.) (Note: The tournament entered the Open Era with the 1969 edition, allowing professional players to compete alongside amateurs.) is an annual tennis tournament created in 1905 and (since 1988) played on outdoor hardcourts (Note: Since 1988, Rod Laver Arena features a retractable roof and lights, allowing indoor and night-time play.) (Note: The Australian Open specifically uses Plexicushion Prestige hardcourts, categorized as a "Medium" speed surface by the International Tennis Federation (ITF).) at Melbourne Park in Melbourne, Australia. The Australian Open is played over a two-week period beginning in mid-January and has been chronologically the first of the four Grand Slam tournaments each year since 1987. The event was not held from 1916 to 1918 because of World War I, from 1941 to 1945 because of World War II and in 1986. The timing of the Australian Open has changed several times. In 1977, the date of the final moved from January to December, which resulted in having two Australian Opens in 1977; there was a January edition and a December edition that year. The originally planned December 1986 edition was moved forward to January 1987, resulting in no Australian Open in 1986. The Australian Open was an Open Era event for the first time in 1969. One year previously in 1968 the French Open, Wimbledon and the US Open were Open Era events for the first time.

== History ==
Christchurch and Hastings, New Zealand, and Perth, Brisbane, Adelaide, Sydney and Melbourne, Australia, have hosted the men's singles event. The event switched cities every year before it settled in 1972 in Melbourne. The event was held at the Kooyong Stadium before moving to Melbourne Park in 1988.

The Australian Open court surface changed once, from grass courts to hardcourts in 1988. Mats Wilander was the only player to win the event on both surfaces; twice on grass and once on hardcourt.

The men's singles rules have undergone several changes since the first edition. This event has always been contested in a knockout format, and all matches have been best-of-five sets except in 1970, 1973, and 1974, when the first round was best-of-three sets, and in 1982, when the third and fourth round were best-of-three sets. Since 1905, all sets have been decided in the advantage format. The lingering death best-of-twelve points tie-break was introduced in 1971 and has been used for the first four sets since then, except from 1980 to 1982, when the tie-break was also played in fifth sets.

The champion receives a miniature replica of the silver-gilt Norman Brookes Challenge Cup, named after the 1911 champion and former Lawn Tennis Association of Australia (LTAA) president, and modeled after the Warwick Vase.

In the Australasian Championships, James Anderson holds the records for most titles with three (1922, 1924–1925), and the most consecutive titles with two (1924–1925). In the Australian Championships, Roy Emerson holds the records for most titles with six (1961, 1963–1967) and most consecutive titles with five (1963–1967). The inclusion of professional tennis players in 1969 marked the competition's entry into the Open Era, in which Novak Djokovic (2008, 2011–2013, 2015–2016, 2019–2021, 2023) holds the record for most titles with ten. The Open Era record for most consecutive titles is three by Djokovic (2011–2013 and 2019–2021). This event was won without losing a set during the Open Era by Rosewall in 1971 and Federer in 2007.

== Champions ==
=== Australian Championships ===
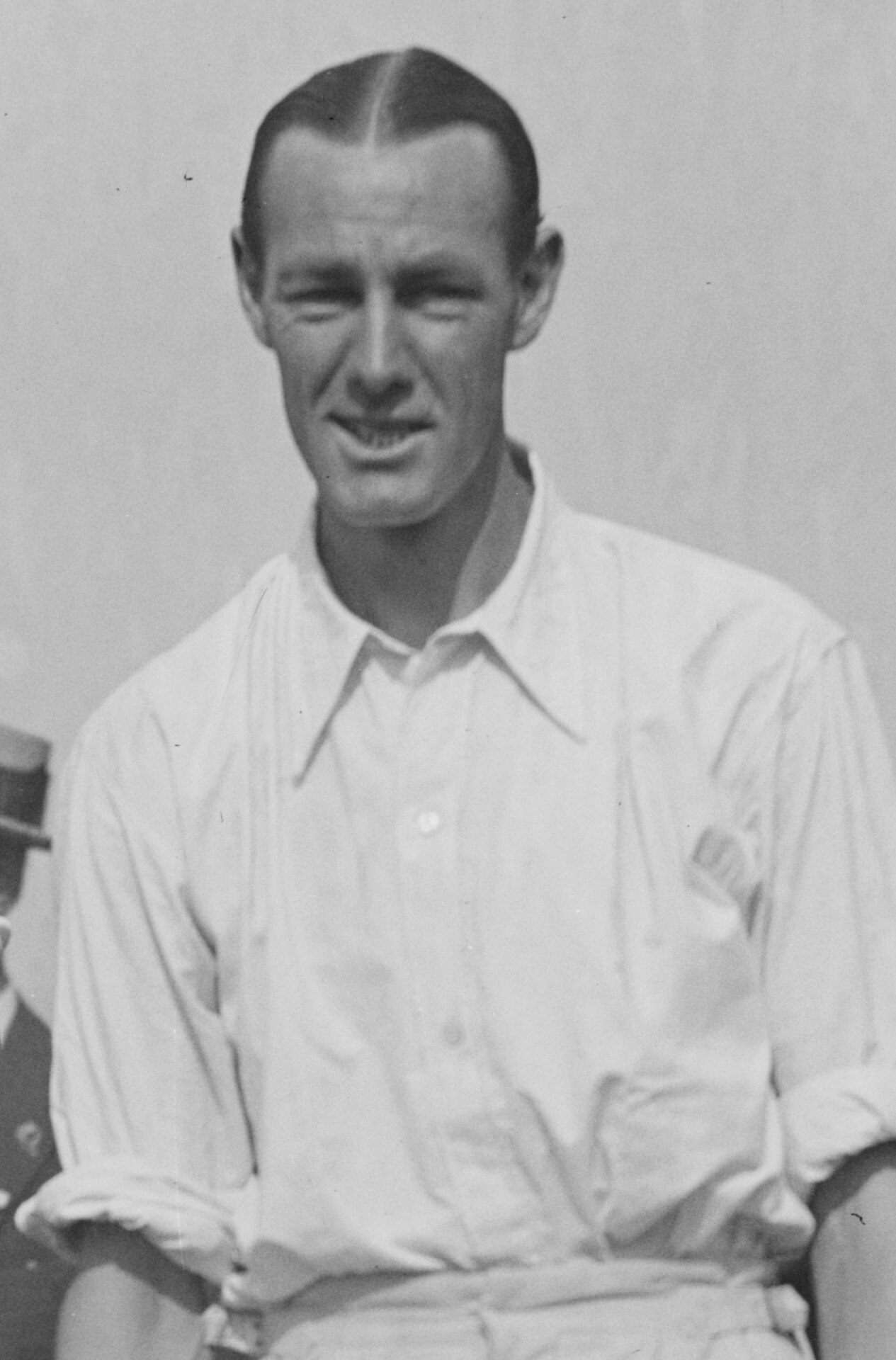
James Anderson won three titles in the Australasian Championships.

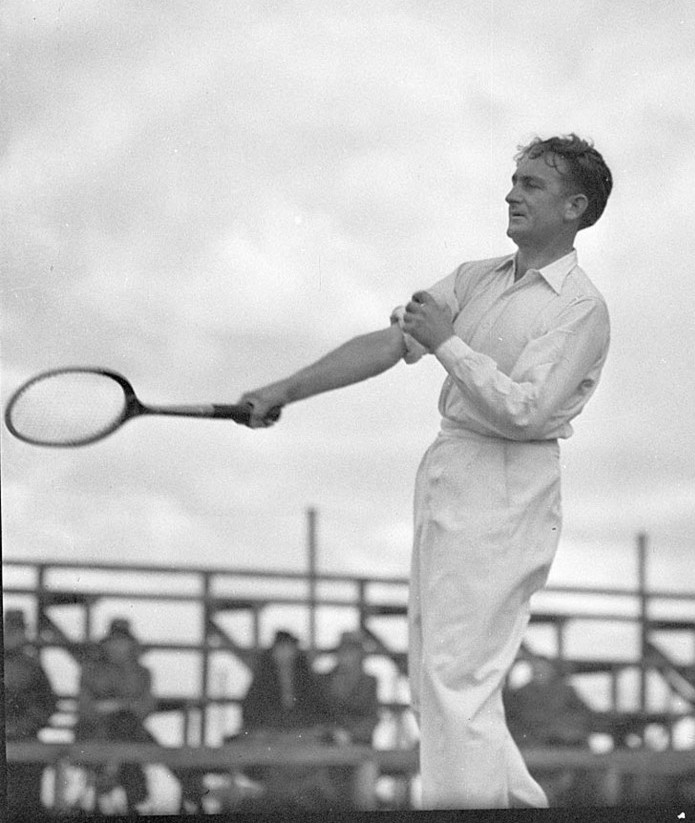
Jack Crawford won in 1931, 1932, 1933 and 1935.

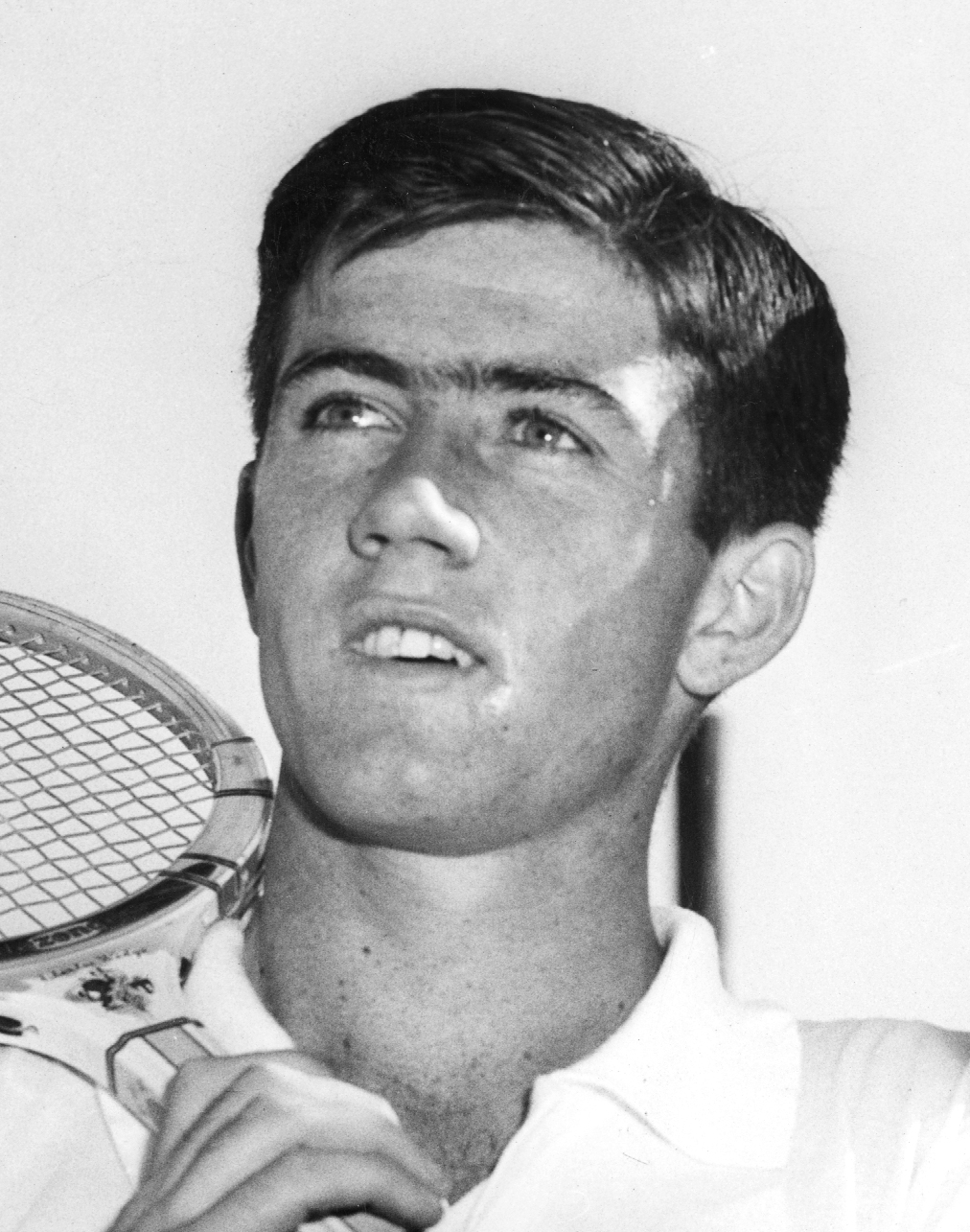
Ken Rosewall, four-time Australian Open champion.

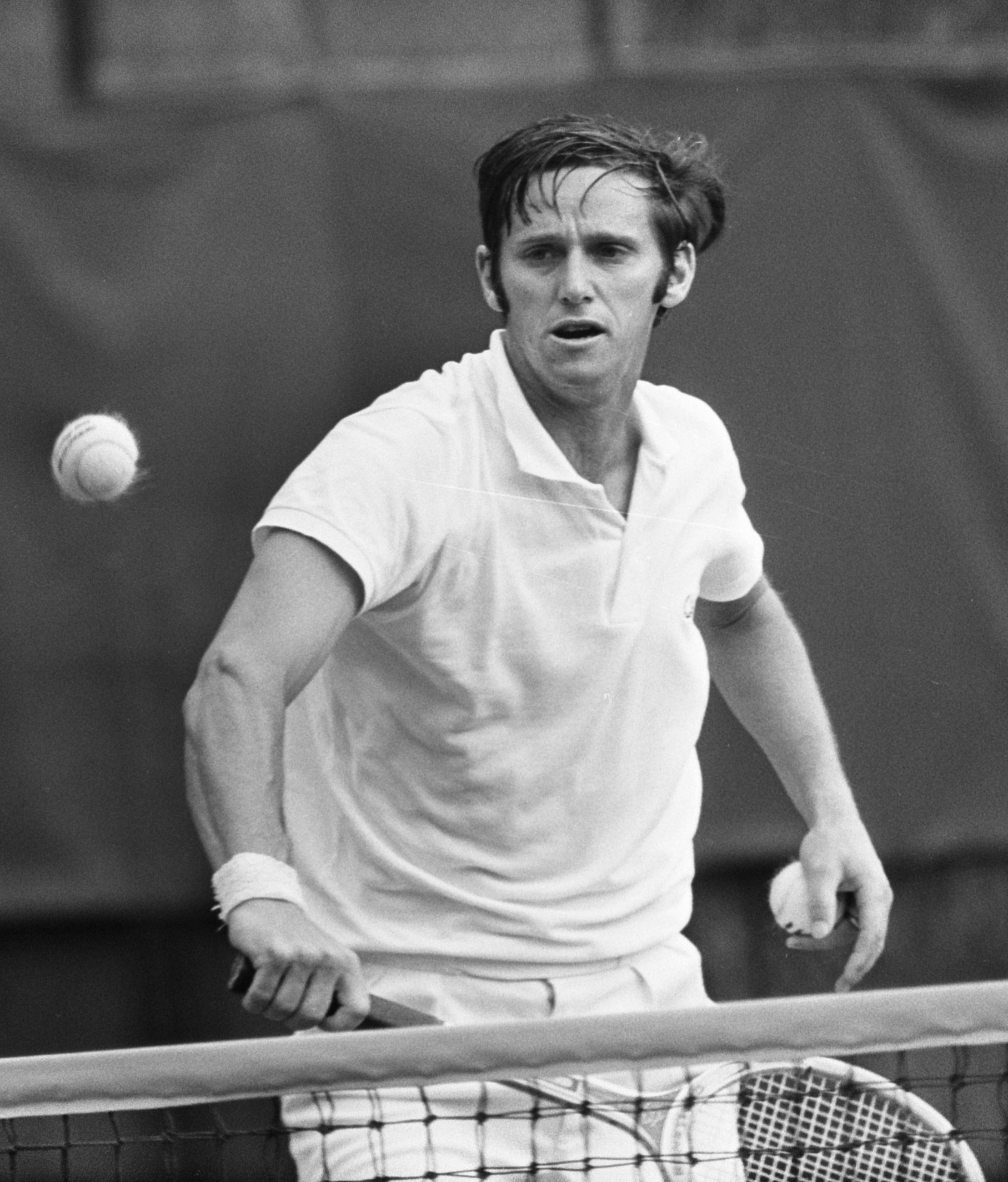
Roy Emerson won six titles in the Australian Championships.

Year (Note: Each year is linked to an article about that particular event's draw.)	Country	Champion	Country	Runner-up	Score in the final
Australasian Championships
1905	AUS	Rodney Heath (1/2)	AUS	Albert Curtis	4–6, 6–3, 6–4, 6–4
1906	NZL	Anthony Wilding (1/2)	NZL	Francis Fisher	6–0, 6–4, 6–4
1907	AUS	Horace Rice	NZL	Harry Parker	6–3, 6–4, 6–4
1908	USA	Fred Alexander	AUS	Alfred Dunlop	3–6, 3–6, 6–0, 6–2, 6–3
1909	NZL	Anthony Wilding (2/2)	AUS	Ernie Parker	6–1, 7–5, 6–2
1910	AUS	Rodney Heath (2/2)	AUS	Horace Rice	6–4, 6–3, 6–2
1911	AUS	Norman Brookes	AUS	Horace Rice	6–1, 6–2, 6–3
1912	BRI	James Cecil Parke	BRI	Alfred Beamish	3–6, 6–3, 1–6, 6–1, 7–5
1913	AUS	Ernie Parker	NZL	Harry Parker	2–6, 6–1, 6–3, 6–2
1914	AUS	Arthur O'Hara Wood	AUS	Gerald Patterson	6–4, 6–3, 5–7, 6–1
1915	BRI	Gordon Lowe	AUS	Horace Rice	4–6, 6–1, 6–1, 6–4
1916	No competition (due to World War I)				
1917	No competition (due to World War I)				
1918	No competition (due to World War I)				
1919	BRI	Algernon Kingscote	AUS	Eric Pockley	6–4, 6–0, 6–3
1920	AUS	Pat O'Hara Wood (1/2)	AUS	Ronald Thomas	6–3, 4–6, 6–8, 6–1, 6–3
1921	AUS	Rice Gemmell	AUS	Alf Hedeman	7–5, 6–1, 6–4
1922	AUS	James Anderson (1/3)	AUS	Gerald Patterson	6–0, 3–6, 3–6, 6–3, 6–2
1923	AUS	Pat O'Hara Wood (2/2)	AUS	Bert St. John	6–1, 6–1, 6–3
1924	AUS	James Anderson (2/3)	AUS	Richard Schlesinger	6–3, 6–4, 3–6, 5–7, 6–3
1925	AUS	James Anderson (3/3)	AUS	Gerald Patterson	11–9, 2–6, 6–2, 6–3
1926	AUS	John Hawkes	AUS	James Willard	6–1, 6–3, 6–1
Australian Championships
1927	AUS	Gerald Patterson	AUS	John Hawkes	3–6, 6–4, 3–6, 18–16, 6–3
1928	FRA	Jean Borotra	AUS	Jack Cummings	6–4, 6–1, 4–6, 5–7, 6–3
1929	GBR	John Colin Gregory	AUS	Richard Schlesinger	6–2, 6–2, 5–7, 7–5
1930	AUS	Edgar Moon	AUS	Harry Hopman	6–3, 6–1, 6–3
1931	AUS	Jack Crawford (1/4)	AUS	Harry Hopman	6–4, 6–2, 2–6, 6–1
1932	AUS	Jack Crawford (2/4)	AUS	Harry Hopman	4–6, 6–3, 3–6, 6–3, 6–1
1933	AUS	Jack Crawford (3/4)	USA	Keith Gledhill	2–6, 7–5, 6–3, 6–2
1934	GBR	Fred Perry	AUS	Jack Crawford	6–3, 7–5, 6–1
1935	AUS	Jack Crawford (4/4)	GBR	Fred Perry	2–6, 6–4, 6–4, 6–4
1936	AUS	Adrian Quist (1/3)	AUS	Jack Crawford	6–2, 6–3, 4–6, 3–6, 9–7
1937	AUS	Vivian McGrath	AUS	John Bromwich	6–3, 1–6, 6–0, 2–6, 6–1
1938	USA	Don Budge	AUS	John Bromwich	6–4, 6–2, 6–1
1939	AUS	John Bromwich (1/2)	AUS	Adrian Quist	6–4, 6–1, 6–3
1940	AUS	Adrian Quist (2/3)	AUS	Jack Crawford	6–3, 6–1, 6–2
1941	No competition (due to World War II) (Note: The tournament was not held from 1941 to 1945 because of World War II.)				
1942	No competition (due to World War II)				
1943	No competition (due to World War II)				
1944	No competition (due to World War II)				
1945	No competition (due to World War II)				
1946	AUS	John Bromwich (2/2)	AUS	Dinny Pails	5–7, 6–3, 7–5, 3–6, 6–2
1947	AUS	Dinny Pails	AUS	John Bromwich	4–6, 6–4, 3–6, 7–5, 8–6
1948	AUS	Adrian Quist (3/3)	AUS	John Bromwich	6–4, 3–6, 6–3, 2–6, 6–3
1949	AUS	Frank Sedgman (1/2)	AUS	John Bromwich	6–3, 6–2, 6–2
1950	AUS	Frank Sedgman (2/2)	AUS	Ken McGregor	6–3, 6–4, 4–6, 6–1
1951	USA	Dick Savitt	AUS	Ken McGregor	6–3, 2–6, 6–3, 6–1
1952	AUS	Ken McGregor	AUS	Frank Sedgman	7–5, 12–10, 2–6, 6–2
1953	AUS	Ken Rosewall (1/4)	AUS	Mervyn Rose	6–0, 6–3, 6–4
1954	AUS	Mervyn Rose	AUS	Rex Hartwig	6–2, 0–6, 6–4, 6–2
1955	AUS	Ken Rosewall (2/4)	AUS	Lew Hoad	9–7, 6–4, 6–4
1956	AUS	Lew Hoad	AUS	Ken Rosewall	6–4, 3–6, 6–4, 7–5
1957	AUS	Ashley Cooper (1/2)	AUS	Neale Fraser	6–3, 9–11, 6–4, 6–2
1958	AUS	Ashley Cooper (2/2)	AUS	Mal Anderson	7–5, 6–3, 6–4
1959	USA (Note: Although he competed for the US in Davis Cup, Alex Olmedo was still a Peruvian citizen.)	Alex Olmedo	AUS	Neale Fraser	6–1, 6–2, 3–6, 6–3
1960	AUS	Rod Laver (1/3)	AUS	Neale Fraser	5–7, 3–6, 6–3, 8–6, 8–6
1961	AUS	Roy Emerson (1/6)	AUS	Rod Laver	1–6, 6–3, 7–5, 6–4
1962	AUS	Rod Laver (2/3)	AUS	Roy Emerson	8–6, 0–6, 6–4, 6–4
1963	AUS	Roy Emerson (2/6)	AUS	Ken Fletcher	6–3, 6–3, 6–1
1964	AUS	Roy Emerson (3/6)	AUS	Fred Stolle	6–3, 6–4, 6–2
1965	AUS	Roy Emerson (4/6)	AUS	Fred Stolle	7–9, 2–6, 6–4, 7–5, 6–1
1966	AUS	Roy Emerson (5/6)	USA	Arthur Ashe	6–4, 6–8, 6–2, 6–3
1967	AUS	Roy Emerson (6/6)	USA	Arthur Ashe	6–4, 6–1, 6–4
1968	AUS	Bill Bowrey	ESP	Juan Gisbert Sr.	7–5, 2–6, 9–7, 6–4

=== Australian Open ===
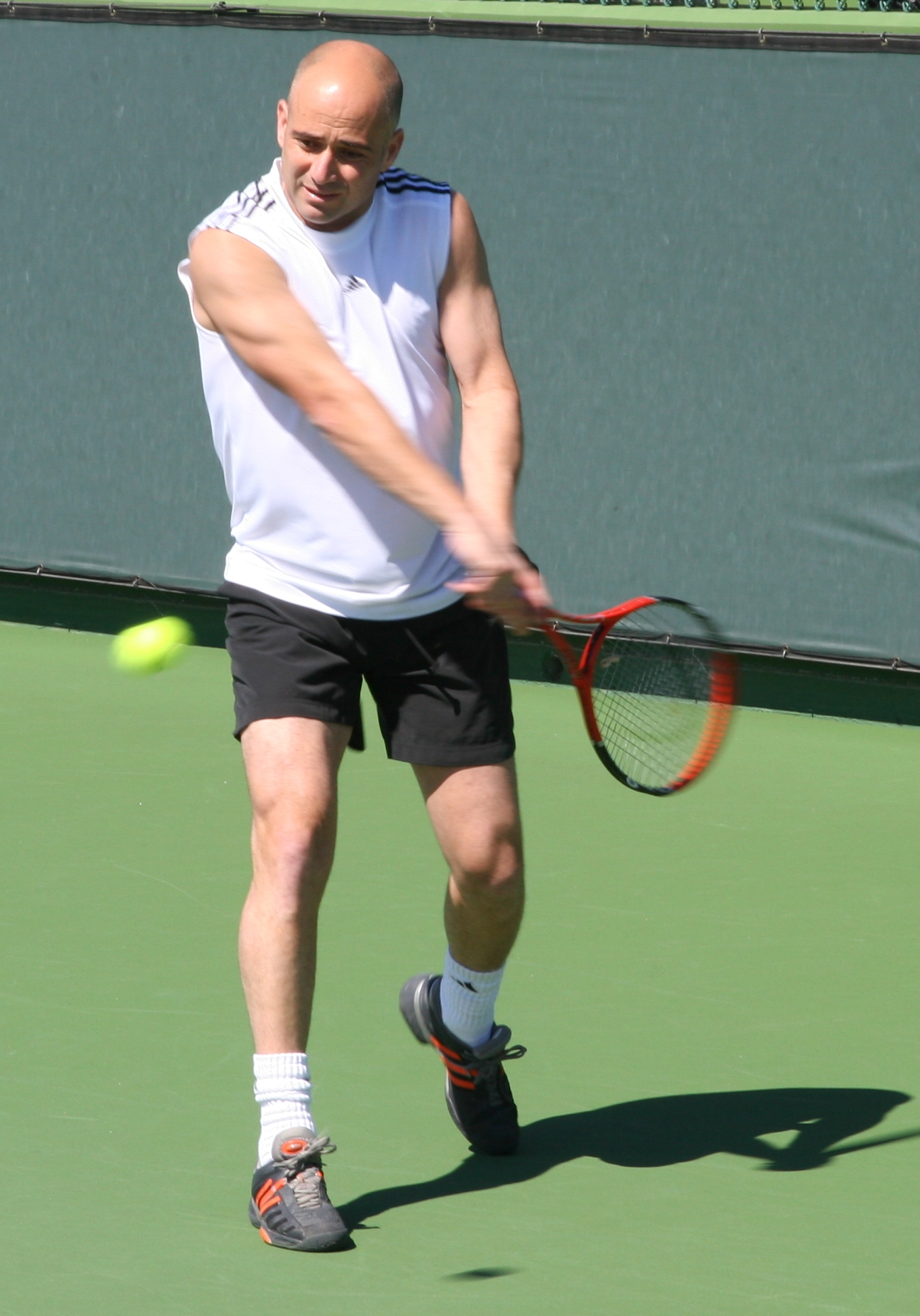
Andre Agassi won 4 singles titles in Australia.

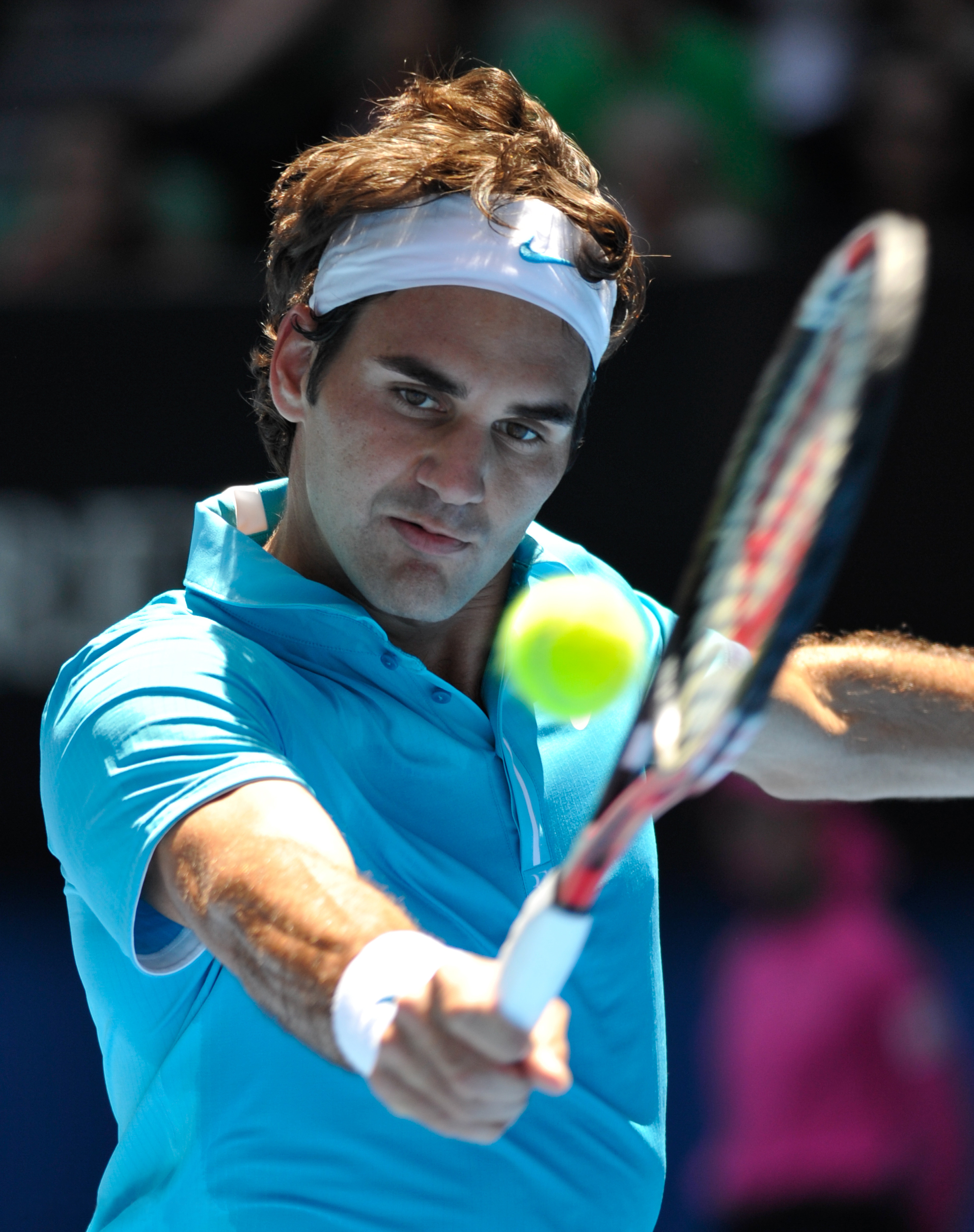
Roger Federer won 6 singles titles at the event.

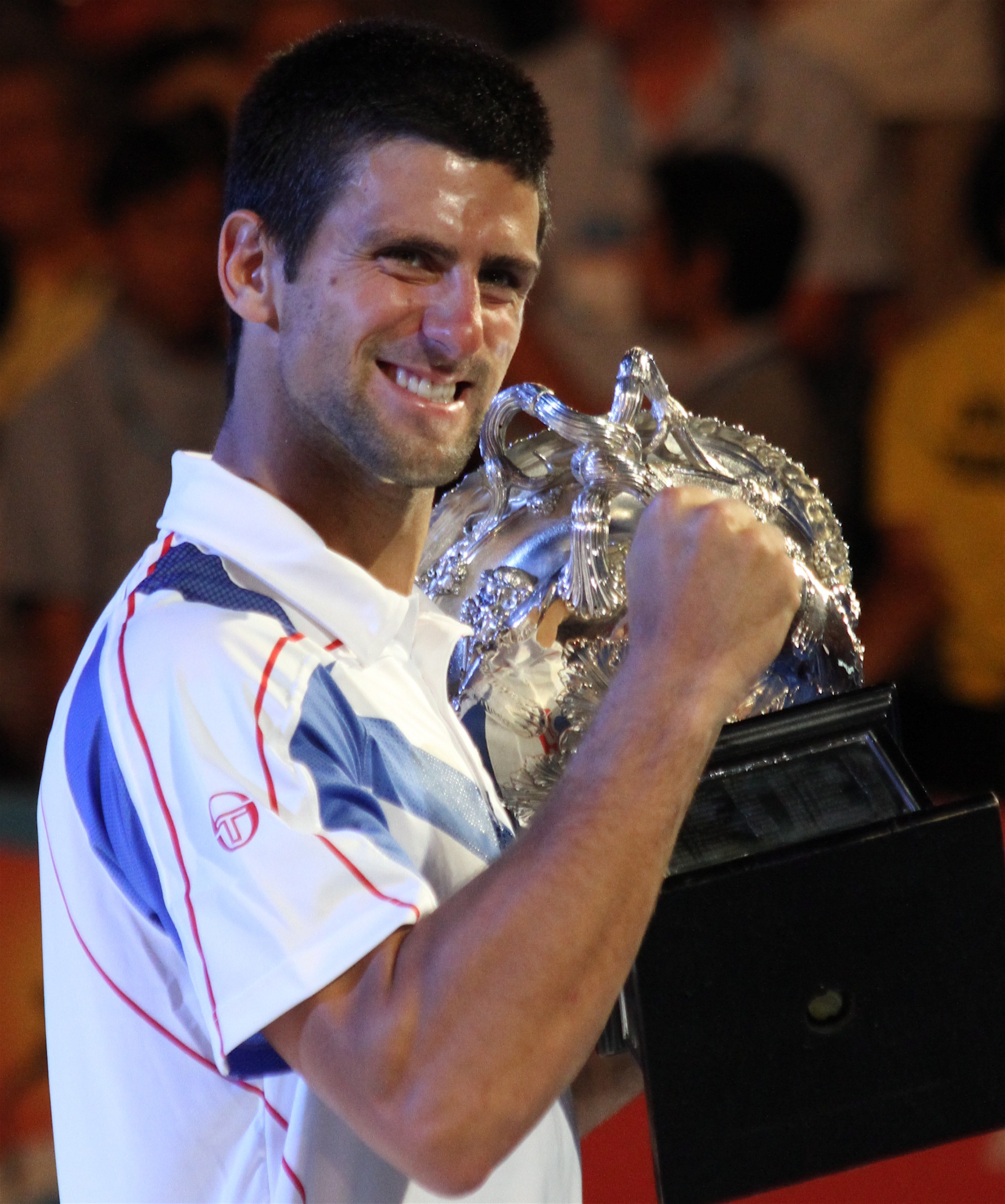
Novak Djokovic holds the all-time Australian Open record with 10 titles.

Year	Country	Champion	Country	Runner-up	Score in the final
1969	AUS	Rod Laver (3/3)	ESP	Andrés Gimeno	6–3, 6–4, 7–5
1970	USA	Arthur Ashe	AUS	Dick Crealy	6–4, 9–7, 6–2
1971	AUS	Ken Rosewall (3/4)	USA	Arthur Ashe	6–1, 7–5, 6–3
1972	AUS	Ken Rosewall (4/4)	AUS	Mal Anderson	7–6^{(7–2)}, 6–3, 7–5
1973	AUS	John Newcombe (1/2)	NZL	Onny Parun	6–3, 6–7, 7–5, 6–1
1974	USA	Jimmy Connors	AUS	Phil Dent	7–6^{(9–7)}, 6–4, 4–6, 6–3
1975	AUS	John Newcombe (2/2)	USA	Jimmy Connors	7–5, 3–6, 6–4, 7–6^{(9–7)}
1976	AUS	Mark Edmondson	AUS	John Newcombe	6–7, 6–3, 7–6, 6–1
1977 (Note: Two Australian Opens were in held in 1977 because of a date change, the first in January and the second in December.)	USA	Roscoe Tanner	ARG	Guillermo Vilas	6–3, 6–3, 6–3
1977	USA	Vitas Gerulaitis	GBR	John Lloyd	6–3, 7–6^{(7–4)}, 5–7, 3–6, 6–2
1978	ARG	Guillermo Vilas (1/2)	AUS	John Marks	6–4, 6–4, 3–6, 6–3
1979	ARG	Guillermo Vilas (2/2)	USA	John Sadri	7–6^{(7–4)}, 6–3, 6–2
1980	USA	Brian Teacher	AUS	Kim Warwick	7–5, 7–6^{(7–4)}, 6–3
1981	RSA (Note: Johan Kriek won his first title as a South African, but his last title was as an American.)	Johan Kriek (1/2)	USA	Steve Denton	6–2, 7–6^{(7–1)}, 6–7^{(1–7)}, 6–4
1982	USA	Johan Kriek (2/2)	USA	Steve Denton	6–3, 6–3, 6–2
1983	SWE	Mats Wilander (1/3)	TCH	Ivan Lendl	6–1, 6–4, 6–4
1984	SWE	Mats Wilander (2/3)	RSA	Kevin Curren	6–7^{(5–7)}, 6–4, 7–6^{(7–3)}, 6–2
1985	SWE	Stefan Edberg (1/2)	SWE	Mats Wilander	6–4, 6–3, 6–3
1986	No competition (due to date change) (Note: The tournament was not held in 1986 because of a date change. See 1986 Australian Open tournament.)				
1987	SWE	Stefan Edberg (2/2)	AUS	Pat Cash	6–3, 6–4, 3–6, 5–7, 6–3
1988	SWE	Mats Wilander (3/3)	AUS	Pat Cash	6–3, 6–7^{(3–7)}, 3–6, 6–1, 8–6
1989	TCH	Ivan Lendl (1/2)	TCH	Miloslav Mečíř	6–2, 6–2, 6–2
1990	TCH	Ivan Lendl (2/2)	SWE	Stefan Edberg	4–6, 7–6^{(7–3)}, 5–2 retired (Note: Ivan Lendl won the final after Stefan Edberg was forced to retire due to a pulled abdominal muscle.)
1991	GER	Boris Becker (1/2)	TCH	Ivan Lendl	1–6, 6–4, 6–4, 6–4
1992	USA	Jim Courier (1/2)	SWE	Stefan Edberg	6–3, 3–6, 6–4, 6–2
1993	USA	Jim Courier (2/2)	SWE	Stefan Edberg	6–2, 6–1, 2–6, 7–5
1994	USA	Pete Sampras (1/2)	USA	Todd Martin	7–6^{(7–4)}, 6–4, 6–4
1995	USA	Andre Agassi (1/4)	USA	Pete Sampras	4–6, 6–1, 7–6^{(8–6)}, 6–4
1996	GER	Boris Becker (2/2)	USA	Michael Chang	6–2, 6–4, 2–6, 6–2
1997	USA	Pete Sampras (2/2)	ESP	Carlos Moyá	6–2, 6–3, 6–3
1998	CZE	Petr Korda	CHI	Marcelo Ríos	6–2, 6–2, 6–2
1999	RUS	Yevgeny Kafelnikov	SWE	Thomas Enqvist	4–6, 6–0, 6–3, 7–6^{(7–1)}
2000	USA	Andre Agassi (2/4)	RUS	Yevgeny Kafelnikov	3–6, 6–3, 6–2, 6–4
2001	USA	Andre Agassi (3/4)	FRA	Arnaud Clément	6–4, 6–2, 6–2
2002	SWE	Thomas Johansson	RUS	Marat Safin	3–6, 6–4, 6–4, 7–6^{(7–4)}
2003	USA	Andre Agassi (4/4)	GER	Rainer Schüttler	6–2, 6–2, 6–1
2004	SUI	Roger Federer (1/6)	RUS	Marat Safin	7–6^{(7–3)}, 6–4, 6–2
2005	RUS	Marat Safin	AUS	Lleyton Hewitt	1–6, 6–3, 6–4, 6–4
2006	SUI	Roger Federer (2/6)	CYP	Marcos Baghdatis	5–7, 7–5, 6–0, 6–2
2007	SUI	Roger Federer (3/6)	CHI	Fernando González	7–6^{(7–2)}, 6–4, 6–4
2008	SRB	Novak Djokovic	FRA	Jo-Wilfried Tsonga	4–6, 6–4, 6–3, 7–6^{(7–2)}
2009	ESP	Rafael Nadal (1/2)	SUI	Roger Federer	7–5, 3–6, 7–6^{(7–3)}, 3–6, 6–2
2010	SUI	Roger Federer (4/6)	GBR	Andy Murray	6–3, 6–4, 7–6^{(13–11)}
2011	SRB	Novak Djokovic (2/10)	GBR	Andy Murray	6–4, 6–2, 6–3
2012	SRB	Novak Djokovic (3/10)	ESP	Rafael Nadal	5–7, 6–4, 6–2, 6–7^{(5–7)}, 7–5
2013	SRB	Novak Djokovic (4/10)	GBR	Andy Murray	6–7^{(2–7)}, 7–6^{(7–3)}, 6–3, 6–2
2014	SUI	Stan Wawrinka	ESP	Rafael Nadal	6–3, 6–2, 3–6, 6–3
2015	SRB	Novak Djokovic (5/10)	GBR	Andy Murray	7–6^{(7–5)}, 6–7^{(4–7)}, 6–3, 6–0
2016	SRB	Novak Djokovic (6/10)	GBR	Andy Murray	6–1, 7–5, 7–6^{(7–3)}
2017	SUI	Roger Federer (5/6)	ESP	Rafael Nadal	6–4, 3–6, 6–1, 3–6, 6–3
2018	SUI	Roger Federer (6/6)	CRO	Marin Čilić	6–2, 6–7^{(5–7)}, 6–3, 3–6, 6–1
2019	SRB	Novak Djokovic (7/10)	ESP	Rafael Nadal	6–3, 6–2, 6–3
2020	SRB	Novak Djokovic (8/10)	AUT	Dominic Thiem	6–4, 4–6, 2–6, 6–3, 6–4
2021	SRB	Novak Djokovic (9/10)	RUS	Daniil Medvedev	7–5, 6–2, 6–2
2022	ESP	Rafael Nadal (2/2)	RUS	Daniil Medvedev	2–6, 6–7^{(5–7)}, 6–4, 6–4, 7–5
2023	SRB	Novak Djokovic (10/10)	GRE	Stefanos Tsitsipas	6–3, 7–6^{(7–4)}, 7–6^{(7–5)}
2024	ITA	Jannik Sinner (1/2)	(Note: On 1 March 2022, the ATP announced that players from Russia and Belarus cannot compete under the name or flag of Russia or Belarus due to the 2022 Russian invasion of Ukraine)	Daniil Medvedev	3–6, 3–6, 6–4, 6–4, 6–3
2025	ITA	Jannik Sinner (2/2)	GER	Alexander Zverev	6–3, 7–6^{(7–4)}, 6–3
2026	ESP	Carlos Alcaraz	SRB	Novak Djokovic	2–6, 6–2, 6–3, 7–5

== Statistics ==
=== Multiple champions ===
Player	Amateur Era	Open Era	All-time	Years
Novak Djokovic (SRB)	0	10	10	2008, 2011, 2012, 2013, 2015, 2016, 2019, 2020, 2021, 2023
Roy Emerson (AUS)	6	0	6	1961, 1963, 1964, 1965, 1966, 1967
Roger Federer (SUI)	0	6	6	2004, 2006, 2007, 2010, 2017, 2018
Andre Agassi (USA)	0	4	4	1995, 2000, 2001, 2003
Jack Crawford (AUS)	4	0	4	1931, 1932, 1933, 1935
Ken Rosewall (AUS)	2	2	4	1953, 1955, 1971, 1972
James Anderson (AUS)	3	0	3	1922, 1924, 1925
Rod Laver (AUS)	2	1	3	1960, 1962, 1969
Adrian Quist (AUS)	3	0	3	1936, 1940, 1948
Mats Wilander (SWE)	0	3	3	1983, 1984, 1988
Boris Becker (GER)	0	2	2	1991, 1996
John Bromwich (AUS)	2	0	2	1939, 1946
Ashley Cooper (AUS)	2	0	2	1957, 1958
Jim Courier (USA)	0	2	2	1992, 1993
Stefan Edberg (SWE)	0	2	2	1985, 1987
Rodney Heath (AUS)	2	0	2	1905, 1910
Johan Kriek (USA) (RSA)	0	2	2	1981, 1982
Ivan Lendl (TCH)	0	2	2	1989, 1990
Rafael Nadal (ESP)	0	2	2	2009, 2022
John Newcombe (AUS)	0	2	2	1973, 1975
Pete Sampras (USA)	0	2	2	1994, 1997
Frank Sedgman (AUS)	2	0	2	1949, 1950
Jannik Sinner (ITA)	0	2	2	2024, 2025
Guillermo Vilas (ARG)	0	2	2	1978, 1979
Anthony Wilding (NZL)	2	0	2	1906, 1909
Pat O'Hara Wood (AUS)	2	0	2	1920, 1923

=== Champions by country ===
Country	Amateur Era	Open Era	All-time	First title	Last title
Australia (AUS)	44	6	50	1905	1976
United States (USA)	4	14	18	1908	2003
Serbia (SRB)	0	10	10	2008	2023
Switzerland (SUI)	0	7	7	2004	2018
Sweden (SWE)	0	6	6	1983	2002
United Kingdom (GBR) (Note: Three wins by players from the United Kingdom of Great Britain and Ireland (1801–1922), plus two wins by players from the United Kingdom of Great Britain and Northern Ireland (1922–present).)	5	0	5	1912	1934
Czechoslovakia (TCH); Czech Republic (CZE) (Note: Two wins as Czechoslovakia (TCH, 1918–1992), one win as Czech Republic (CZE, 1993–present))	0	3	3	1989	1998
Spain (ESP)	0	3	3	2009	2026
Argentina (ARG)	0	2	2	1978	1979
Germany (GER)	0	2	2	1991	1996
Italy (ITA)	0	2	2	2024	2025
New Zealand (NZL)	2	0	2	1906	1909
Russia (RUS)	0	2	2	1999	2005
France (FRA)	1	0	1	1928	1928
South Africa (RSA)	0	1	1	1981	1981

== See also ==
Australian Open other competitions

- List of Australian Open women's singles champions
- List of Australian Open men's doubles champions
- List of Australian Open women's doubles champions
- List of Australian Open mixed doubles champions

Grand Slam men's singles

- List of French Open men's singles champions
- List of Wimbledon gentlemen's singles champions
- List of US Open men's singles champions
- List of Grand Slam men's singles champions
