= 1919 in tennis =

This page covers all the important events in the sport of tennis in 1919. It provides the results of notable tournaments throughout the year on both the men's and women's ILTF tennis circuits.

== Australian Open ==
Category	Champion(s)	Finalist(s)	Score
Singles	(United Kingdom) Algernon Kingscote	(Australia) Eric Pockley	6–4, 6–0, 6–3
Doubles	(Australia) Pat O'Hara Wood (Australia) Ronald Thomas	(Australia) James Anderson (Australia) Arthur Lowe	7–5, 6–1, 7–9, 3–6, 6–3

== French Open ==
Not a Grand Slam event.

== Wimbledon ==
Category	Champion(s)	Finalist(s)	Score
Men's singles	(Australia) Gerald Patterson	(Australia) Norman Brookes	6–3, 7–5, 6–2
Women's singles	(France) Suzanne Lenglen	(United Kingdom) Dorothea Lambert Chambers	10–8, 4–6, 9–7
Men's doubles	(Australia) Ronald Thomas (Australia) Pat O'Hara Wood	(Australia) Rodney Heath (Australia) Randolph Lycett	6–4, 6–2, 4–6, 6–2
Women's doubles	(France) Suzanne Lenglen (United States) Elizabeth Ryan	(United Kingdom) Dorothea Lambert Chambers (United Kingdom) Ethel Larcombe	4–6, 7–5, 6–3
Mixed doubles	(Australia) Randolph Lycett (United States) Elizabeth Ryan	(United Kingdom) Albert Prebble (United Kingdom) Dorothea Lambert Chambers	6–0, 6–0

== US Open ==
Category	Champion(s)	Finalist(s)	Score
Men's singles	(United States) Bill Johnston	(United States) Bill Tilden	6–4, 6–4, 6–3
Women's singles	(United States) Hazel Hotchkiss Wightman	(United States) Marion Zinderstein	6–1, 6–2
Men's doubles	(Australia) Norman Brookes (Australia) Gerald Patterson	(United States) Bill Tilden (United States) Vincent Richards	8–6, 6–3, 4–6, 4–6, 6–2
Women's doubles	(United States) Marion Zinderstein (United States) Eleanor Goss	(United States) Eleonora Sears (United States) Hazel Wightman	10–8, 9–7
Mixed doubles	(United States) Marion Zinderstein (United States) Vincent Richards	(United States) Florence Ballin (United States) Bill Tilden	2–6, 11–9, 6–2
