= 1914 in tennis =

This page covers all the important events in the sport of tennis in 1914. It provides the results of notable tournaments throughout the year on both the men's and women's ILTF tennis circuits.

== Australasian Championships ==
| Category | Champion(s) | Finalist(s) | Score |
|---|---|---|---|
| Singles | (Australia) Arthur O'Hara Wood | (Australia) Gerald Patterson | 6–4, 6–3, 5–7, 6–1 |
| Doubles | (Australia) Ashley Campbell (Australia) Gerald Patterson | (Australia) Rodney Heath (Australia) Arthur O'Hara Wood | 7–5, 3–6, 6–3, 6–3 |

== French Championships ==
Not a Grand Slam event.

== Wimbledon ==
| Category | Champion(s) | Finalist(s) | Score |
|---|---|---|---|
| Men's singles | (Australia) Norman Brookes | (New Zealand) Anthony Wilding | 6–4, 6–4, 7–5 |
| Women's singles | (United Kingdom) Dorothea Lambert Chambers | (United Kingdom) Ethel Thomson Larcombe | 7–5, 6–4 |
| Men's doubles | (Australia) Norman Brookes (New Zealand) Anthony Wilding | (United Kingdom) Herbert Roper Barrett (United Kingdom) Charles Dixon | 6–1, 6–1, 5–7, 8–6 |
| Women's doubles | (United Kingdom) Agnes Morton (United States) Elizabeth Ryan | (United Kingdom) Edith Hannam (United Kingdom) Ethel Larcombe | 6–1, 6–3 |
| Mixed doubles | (United Kingdom) James Cecil Parke (United Kingdom) Ethel Larcombe | (New Zealand) Anthony Wilding (France) Marguerite Broquedis | 4–6, 6–4, 6–2 |

== U.S. National Championships ==
| Category | Champion(s) | Finalist(s) | Score |
|---|---|---|---|
| Men's singles | (United States) R. Norris Williams | (United States) Maurice McLoughlin | 6–3, 8–6, 10–8 |
| Women's singles | (United States) Mary Browne | (United States) Marie Wagner | 6–2, 1–6, 6–1 |
| Men's doubles | (United States) Maurice McLoughlin (United States) Tom Bundy | (United States) George Church (United States) Dean Mathey | 6–4, 6–2, 6–4 |
| Women's doubles | (United States) Mary Browne (United States) Louise Riddell Williams | (United States) Louise Hammond Raymond (United States) Edna Wildey | 10–8, 6–2 |
| Mixed doubles | (United States) Mary Browne (United States) Bill Tilden | (United States) Margarette Myers (United States) J. R. Rowland | 6–1, 6–4 |
