= 1914 Australasian Championships – Singles =

Singles
- 1914 Australasian Championships

Final
- Champion: (Australia) Arthur O'Hara Wood
- Runner-up: (Australia) Gerald Patterson
- Score: 6–4, 6–3, 5–7, 6–1

Details
- Draw: 27

Events
Singles	Doubles
- Australasian Championships

Arthur O'Hara Wood defeated Gerald Patterson 6–4, 6–3, 5–7, 6–1 in the final to win the men's singles tennis title at the 1914 Australasian Championships.

== Draw ==
=== Key ===
- Q = Qualifier
- WC = Wild card
- LL = Lucky loser
- r = Retired

Quarterfinals
(Australia) Arthur O'Hara Wood	6	6	6
(Australia) Charles Simmill Buckley	4	2	3
(Australia) Rupert Wertheim	6	6	3	6
(Australia) A. Roy Taylor	3	4	6	3
(Australia) Gerald Patterson	6	6	6
(Australia) Leslie Rainey	3	4	2
(Australia) Rodney Heath	6	3	6	6
(Australia) Ronald Thomas	1	6	2	3

Semifinals
(Australia) Arthur O'Hara Wood	6	6	3	6
(Australia) Rupert Wertheim	3	0	6	4
(Australia) Gerald Patterson	6	6	6
(Australia) Rodney Heath	3	2	4

Finals
(Australia) Arthur O'Hara Wood	6	6	5	6
(Australia) Gerald Patterson	4	3	7	1

=== Top half ===
First round
(Australia) A. O'Hara Wood	6	6	6
(Australia) G. Roberts	2	2	2
(Australia) T. Fitchett	1	6	6	6
(Australia) J. Horan	6	4	0	4
(Australia) F. E. Barritt	6	6	1	6
(Australia) McCutcheon	1	4	6	1
(Australia) C. Buckley	6	6	rtd.
(Australia) B. Hawthorn	2	2
(Australia) R. Wertheim	6	6	4	6
(Australia) L. Todd	2	2	6	3

Second round
(Australia) A. O'Hara Wood	6	6	6
(Australia) T. Fitchett	0	2	2
(Australia) C. Buckley	8	6	6
(Australia) F. E. Barritt	6	4	2
(Australia) R. Wertheim	w/o
(Australia) H. Rice
(Australia) A. R. Taylor	6	6	6
(Australia) Stanton	3	3	0

Quarterfinals
(Australia) A. O'Hara Wood	6	6	6
(Australia) C. Buckley	4	2	3
(Australia) R. Wertheim	6	6	3	6
(Australia) A. R. Taylor	3	4	6	3

Semifinals
(Australia) A. O'Hara Wood	6	6	3	6
(Australia) R. Wertheim	3	0	6	4

=== Bottom half ===
First round
(Australia) L. Rainey	6	6	6
(Australia) H. Lemme	0	3	3
(Australia) R. Reid	5	6	8	6
(Australia) C. Watson	7	4	6	4
(Australia) R. W. Heath	6	6	6
(Australia) Samuel Percival England	3	1	0
(Australia) Leslie Norman Roebuck	6	6	6
(Australia) Walter L. Marsden	2	2	4
(Australia) R. Thomas	6	6	6
(Australia) Alfred William Foster	0	1	4
(Australia) George Ward Cole Howitt	6	6	6
(Australia) Frederick Elliott Von Frankenberg	3	4	2

Second round
(Australia) G. L. Patterson	6	6	5	6
(Australia) Charles Ray Lister	0	3	7	3
(Australia) L. Rainey	6	7	6
(Australia) R. Reid	2	5	0
(Australia) R. W. Heath	w/o
(Australia) L. Roebuck
(Australia) R. Thomas	7	6	rtd.
(Australia) G. Howitt	5	2

Quarterfinals
(Australia) G. L. Patterson	6	6	6
(Australia) L. Rainey	3	4	2
(Australia) R. W. Heath	6	3	6	6
(Australia) R. Thomas	1	6	2	3

Semifinals
(Australia) G. L. Patterson	6	6	6
(Australia) R. W. Heath	3	2	4

Preceded by 1914 U.S. National Championships – Men's singles	Grand Slam men's singles	Succeeded by 1915 Australasian Championships – Singles
