= 1919 Australasian Championships – Singles =

Singles
- 1919 Australasian Championships

Final
- Champion: (United Kingdom) Algernon Kingscote
- Runner-up: (Australia) Eric Pockley
- Score: 6–4, 6–0, 6–3

Details
- Draw: 38

Events
Singles	Doubles
- Australasian Championships

Algernon Kingscote defeated Eric Pockley in the final 6–4, 6–0, 6–3 to win the men's singles tennis title at the 1919 Australasian Championships.

Gordon Lowe was the champion of the 1915 edition, before the World War I interruption, but chose not to defend his title.

== Draw ==
Key

- Q = Qualifier
- WC = Wild card
- LL = Lucky loser
- Alt = Alternate
- ITF = ITF entry
- PR = Protected ranking
- SR = Special ranking
- SE = Special exempt
- JE = Junior exempt
- JR = Junior Accelerator Programme entrant
- CO = College Accelerator Programme entrant
- NG = Next Gen Accelerator Program entrant
- w/o = Walkover
- r = Retired
- d = Defaulted

=== Finals ===
Quarterfinals
(United Kingdom) Algernon Kingscote	w/o
(United Kingdom) Alfred Beamish
(Australia) James Anderson	6	6	6	6
(Australia) Henry Marsh	1	8	4	3
(United Kingdom) Arthur Lowe	6	6	6
(Australia) Pat O'Hara Wood	3	2	2
(Australia) Leonard Darby	3	4	0
(Australia) Eric Pockley	6	6	6

Semifinals
(United Kingdom) Algernon Kingscote	3	7	6	6
(Australia) James Anderson	6	5	4	3
(United Kingdom) Arthur Lowe	4	3	1
(Australia) Eric Pockley	6	6	6

Final
(United Kingdom) Algernon Kingscote	6	6	6
(Australia) Eric Pockley	4	0	3

=== Top half ===
==== Section 1 ====
First round
(Australia) N Peach	6	7	6
(Australia) G Reid	4	5	1
(Australia) R Eagle	4	6	6	6
(Australia) T Newton	6	4	4	3
(United Kingdom) A Beamish	7	6	6
(Australia) R Kidston	5	0	2

Second round
(United Kingdom) A Kingscote	w/o
(Australia) K Poulton
A North	4	0	6	7	6
(Australia) C Todd	6	6	4	5	5^{r}
(Australia) N Peach	6	6	6
(Australia) R Eagle	4	2	4
(United Kingdom) A Beamish	6	6	6
(Australia) F Peach	1	4	1

Third round
(United Kingdom) A Kingscote	6	6	6
A North	2	4	2
(Australia) N Peach	4	9	4	3
(United Kingdom) A Beamish	6	7	6	6

Quarterfinals
(United Kingdom) A Kingscote	w/o
(United Kingdom) A Beamish

==== Section 2 ====
First round

Second round
(Australia) J Anderson	w/o
(Australia) J O'Ryan
(Australia) J Clemenger	1	6	3	7	6
(Australia) G Booth	6	4	6	5	1
(Australia) R Thomas	6	6	6
(Australia) R Berriman	0	1	1
(Australia) Henry Marsh	7	3	6	6
(Australia) S Henderson	5	6	4	3

Third round
(Australia) J Anderson	6	6	6
(Australia) J Clemenger	2	1	4
(Australia) R Thomas	4	5	2
(Australia) Henry Marsh	6	7	6

Quarterfinals
(Australia) J Anderson	6	6	6	6
(Australia) Henry Marsh	1	8	4	3

=== Bottom half ===
==== Section 3 ====
First round
C Cross	6	6	6
A Best	1	1	2
(Australia) H Kirkpatrick	6	5	4	6	6
L Scott	1	7	6	1	0
(Australia) P O'Hara Wood	6	6	6
R Goodman	1	4	2

Second round
(United Kingdom) A Lowe	w/o
(Australia) T Carr
Pawsey	4	1	1
E Jordan	6	6	6
R Neil	6	6	6
C Cross	2	3	1
(Australia) H Kirkpatrick	3	1	r
(Australia) P O'Hara Wood	6	6

Third round
(United Kingdom) A Lowe	6	6	6
E Jordan	0	4	2
R Neil	2	3	4
(Australia) P O'Hara Wood	6	6	6

Quarterfinals
(United Kingdom) A Lowe	6	6	6
(Australia) P O'Hara Wood	3	2	2

==== Section 4 ====
First round

Second round
(Australia) L Darby	w/o
A Storey
(Australia) AR Taylor	7	6	r
(Australia) G Patterson	5	4
H Penny	w/o
E. L. Jones
(Australia) L Todd	4	2	6
(Australia) E Pockley	6	6	8

Third round
(Australia) L Darby	w/o
(Australia) G Patterson
H Penny	3	0	4
(Australia) E Pockley	6	6	6

Quarterfinals
(Australia) L Darby	3	4	0
(Australia) E Pockley	6	6	6

Preceded by 1918 U.S. National Championships – Men's singles	Grand Slam men's singles	Succeeded by 1919 Wimbledon Championships – Men's singles
