= 1919 Australasian Championships =

- Date: 19–24 January 1920
- Edition: 12th
- Category: Grand Slam (ITF)
- Surface: Grass
- Location: Sydney, New South Wales, Australia
- Venue: Double Bay Grounds

Champions

Singles
- (United Kingdom) Algernon Kingscote

Doubles
- (Australia) Pat O'Hara Wood / (Australia) Ronald Thomas
- Australasian Championships

The 1919 Australasian Championships was a tennis tournament that took place on outdoor grass courts at the Double Bay Grounds in Sydney, Australia. Due to World War I, the tournament was not held until early 1920, from 19 January to 24 January. It was the 12th edition of the Australian Championships (now known as the Australian Open), the 2nd held in Sydney, and the last Grand Slam tournament of 1919. The men's singles title was won by Algernon Kingscote.

== Finals ==
=== Singles ===
(United Kingdom) Algernon Kingscote defeated (Australia) Eric Pockley 6–4, 6–0, 6–3

=== Doubles ===
(Australia) Pat O'Hara Wood / (Australia) Ronald Thomas defeated (Australia) James Anderson / (Australia) Arthur Lowe 7–5, 6–1, 7–9, 3–6, 6–3

Preceded by 1919 U.S. National Championships	Grand Slams	Succeeded by 1920 Australasian Championships
