= 1930 French Championships – Seniors over 40 singles =

Seniors over 40 singles
- 1930 French Championships

Final
- Champion: (Germany) Otto Froitzheim
- Runner-up: (France) François Blanchy
- Score: 6–0, 6–4

Events
Singles	men	women
Doubles	men	women
← 1929 ·	French Championships	· 1931 →

Otto Froitzheim won the "over 40" seniors' championships.

== Tournament ==
First round
(France) François Blanchy	6	6
M. Francès	3	1
(United Kingdom) Arthur Wallis Myers
Daninos	w/o
Fabre
(United Kingdom) Major Ritchie	w/o
Hunt	1	7	1
(United States) A. W. Asthalter	6	5	6
(United Kingdom) Algernon Kingscote	6	5	3
(France) Étienne Micard	3	7	6
(France) Jean Soule
Guillemant	w/o
Renard	2	2
(United Kingdom) Ernest Talbot Lamb	6	6
Fath	1	1
(Germany) Otto Froitzheim	6	6

Quarterfinals
(France) François Blanchy	6	6
Daninos	1	1
(United Kingdom) Major Ritchie	6	6
Asthalter	4	3
(France) Étienne Micard	6	4	0
Guillemaut	3	6	6
(United Kingdom) Ernest Talbot Lamb	1	3
(Germany) Otto Froitzheim	6	6

Semifinals
(France) François Blanchy	6	6
(United Kingdom) Major Ritchie	1	0
Guillemaut	0	3
(Germany) Otto Froitzheim	6	6

Final
(France) François Blanchy	0	4
(Germany) Otto Froitzheim	6	6
