= Leslie Rainey =

Australian sportsman

Les Rainey
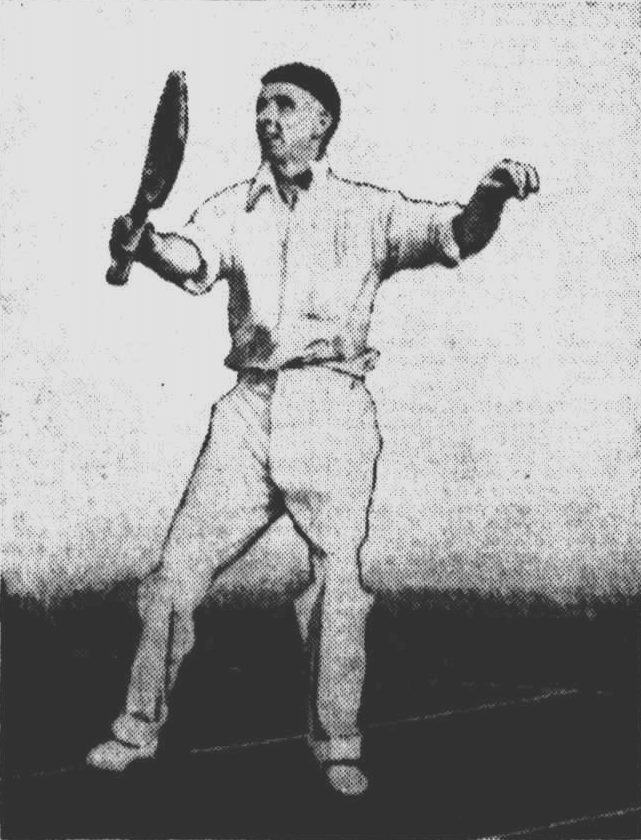

Personal information
- Full name: Leslie Newburn Rainey
- Born: 10 January 1881; South Yarra, Victoria
- Died: 27 August 1962 (aged 81); Melbourne, Victoria
- Original team: Melbourne Grammar
- Height: 171 cm (5 ft 7 in)

Playing career^{1}
Years	Club	Games (Goals)
1899–1900	Essendon	5 (3)
1902–1903	Melbourne	18 (17)
Total		23 (20)
- ^{1} Playing statistics correct to the end of 1903.

Leslie Newburn Rainey (10 January 1881 – 27 August 1962) was an Australian sportsman who played Australian rules football, cricket and tennis. He was a first-class cricketer for Victoria, footballer for Essendon and Melbourne in the Victorian Football League (VFL), as well as a tennis player at the Australasian Championships (now known as the Australian Open).

After managing only five appearances for Essendon during his time at the club in 1899 and 1900, Rainey crossed to Melbourne where he had more success. He played a full season in 1902, including Melbourne's semi final loss to his old club, and kicked 17 goals. Rainey finished his football career with 23 VFL games and 20 goals.

Rainey played his cricket as an all-rounder and participated in two first-class matches for Victoria, both against Tasmania at the Melbourne Cricket Ground. He put in a good performance in the second of those matches, in 1905, scoring an unbeaten 60 and taking 6/46 in Tasmania's second innings.

He competed in the 1914 and 1924 Australasian Tennis Championships.

== See also ==
- List of Victoria first-class cricketers
