= Arthur Lowe (tennis) =

English tennis player

Arthur Holden Lowe
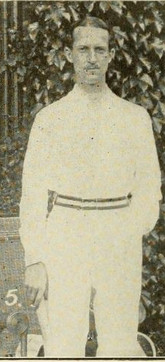
- Lowe in 1914
- Born: 29 January 1886; Edgbaston, Birmingham, England
- Died: 22 October 1958 (aged 72); London, England
- Father: Sir Francis Lowe, 1st Baronet
- Relatives: Gordon Lowe (brother); John Lowe (brother)
- Tennis career
- Country (sports): United Kingdom

Singles
- Highest ranking: No. 7 (1914, A. Wallis Myers)

Grand Slam singles results
- Australian Open: SF (1919)
- Wimbledon: SF (1910)

Doubles

Grand Slam doubles results
- Australian Open: F (1919)
- Wimbledon: F (1914^{AC}, 1921^{AC})

Mixed doubles

Grand Slam mixed doubles results
- Wimbledon: 3R (1919)

Arthur Holden Lowe (29 January 1886 – 22 October 1958) was an English tennis player.

== Tennis career ==
Lowe competed in the 1912 Summer Olympics in both singles and doubles.

He was ranked World No. 7 in 1914 by A. Wallis Myers of The Daily Telegraph.

Lowe won three titles at the Queen's Club, the pre-Wimbledon tournament, winning his first two back-to-back in 1913–14, and his third over 10 years later in 1925. In 1919 Lowe was runner-up in the Australian Open Men's Doubles with his partner James Anderson. In the singles, Lowe beat Pat O'Hara Wood in torrid heat, with one of the best displays of groundstrokes seen in Melbourne up to that point in time. He lost in the semi-finals to Eric Pockley.

His brother Gordon Lowe was also a tennis player, and another brother John played first-class cricket.

== Grand Slam finals ==
=== Doubles: (2 losses) ===
Result	Date	Championship	Surface	Partner	Opponents	Score'
Loss	1919	Australasian Championships	Grass	(Australia) James Anderson	(Australia) Pat O'Hara Wood (Australia) Ron Thomas	5–7, 1–6, 9–7, 6–3, 3–6
Loss	1921	Wimbledon	Grass	(United Kingdom of Great Britain and Ireland) Gordon Lowe	(United Kingdom of Great Britain and Ireland) Randolph Lycett (United Kingdom of Great Britain and Ireland) Max Woosnam	3–6, 0–6, 5–7
