= Bronfay Farm Military Cemetery =

Military cemetery in Somme, France

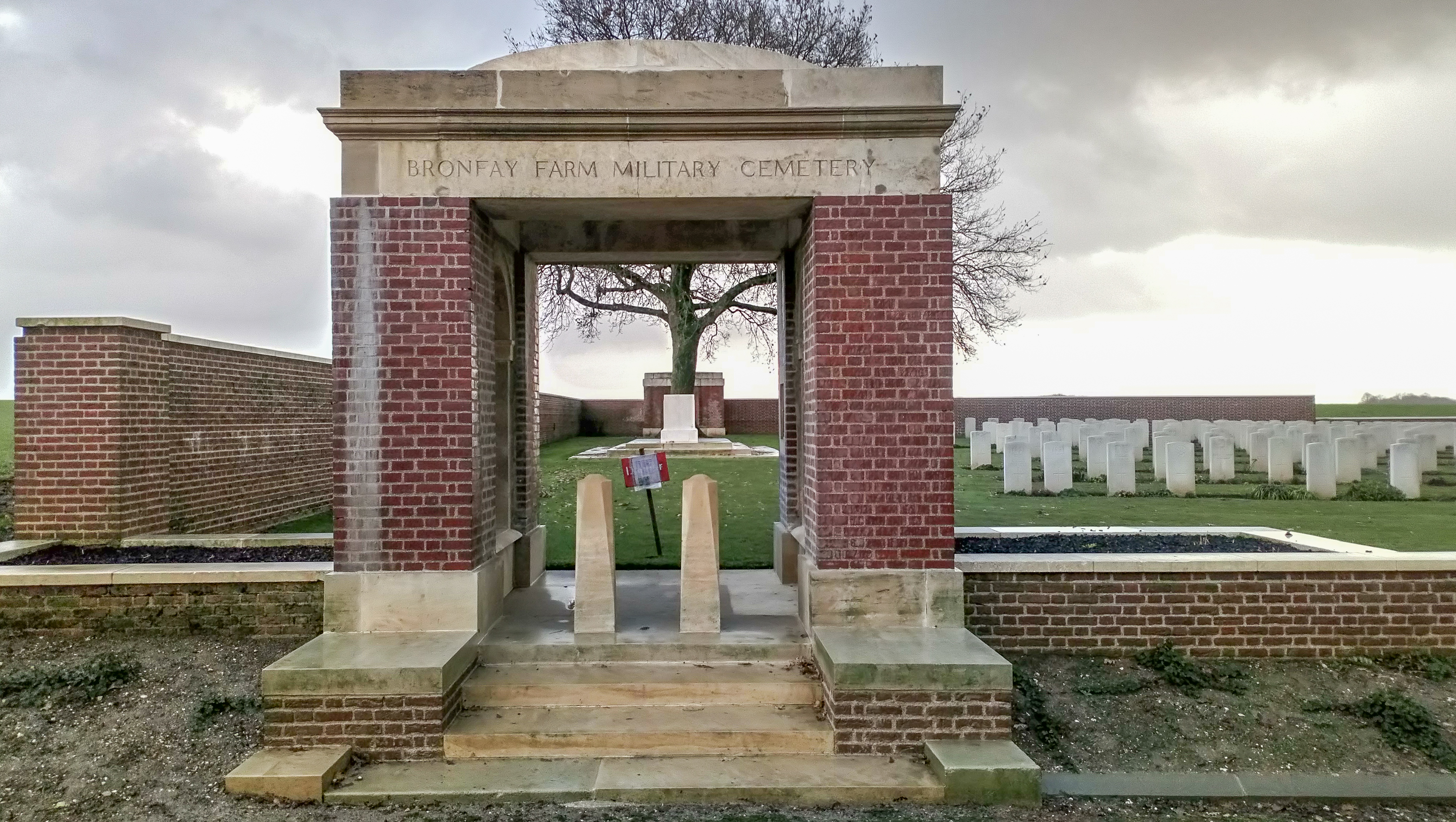
- Interactive map of Bronfay Farm Military Cemetery

Details
- Established: October 1914
- Location: Bray-sur-Somme, Somme, France
- Country: British and Commonwealth
- Coordinates: 49.9675°N 2.7433°E
- Type: Military
- Owned by: Commonwealth War Graves Commission (CWGC)
- No. of graves: 537 total, 525 identified
- Website: Official website
- Find a Grave: Bronfay Farm Military Cemetery

The Bronfay Farm Military Cemetery is a military cemetery located in the Somme region of France commemorating British, Commonwealth, and French soldiers who fought in the Battle of the Somme in World War I. The cemetery contains mainly those who died between October 1914 and February 1917 and in 1918 near Bronfay Farm and the nearby village of Bray.

== Location ==
The cemetery is located a short distance southeast of Bronfay Farm, which is 3 kilometers northeast of the village of Bray-sur-Somme. Bray-sur-Somme is approximately 8 kilometers southeast of Albert, France.

== Establishment of the cemetery ==
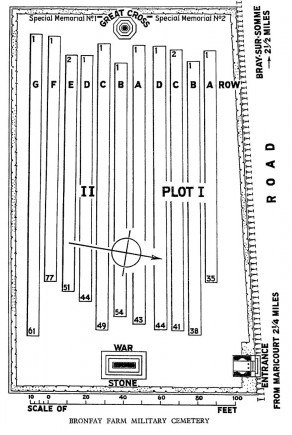
Bronfay Farm Military Cemetery Plan

The cemetery was established by French troops in October 1914. It was used by Commonwealth troops, in particular the British XIV Corps Main Dressing Station from August 1915 to February 1917. Burials were also added between March and September 1918, during the German spring offensive. After the end of the war, Bronfay Farm and Bray casualties from the latter period were reburied in the cemetery. The modern day cemetery was designed by Sir Edwin Lutyens and George Hartley Goldsmith.

=== Galerie ===
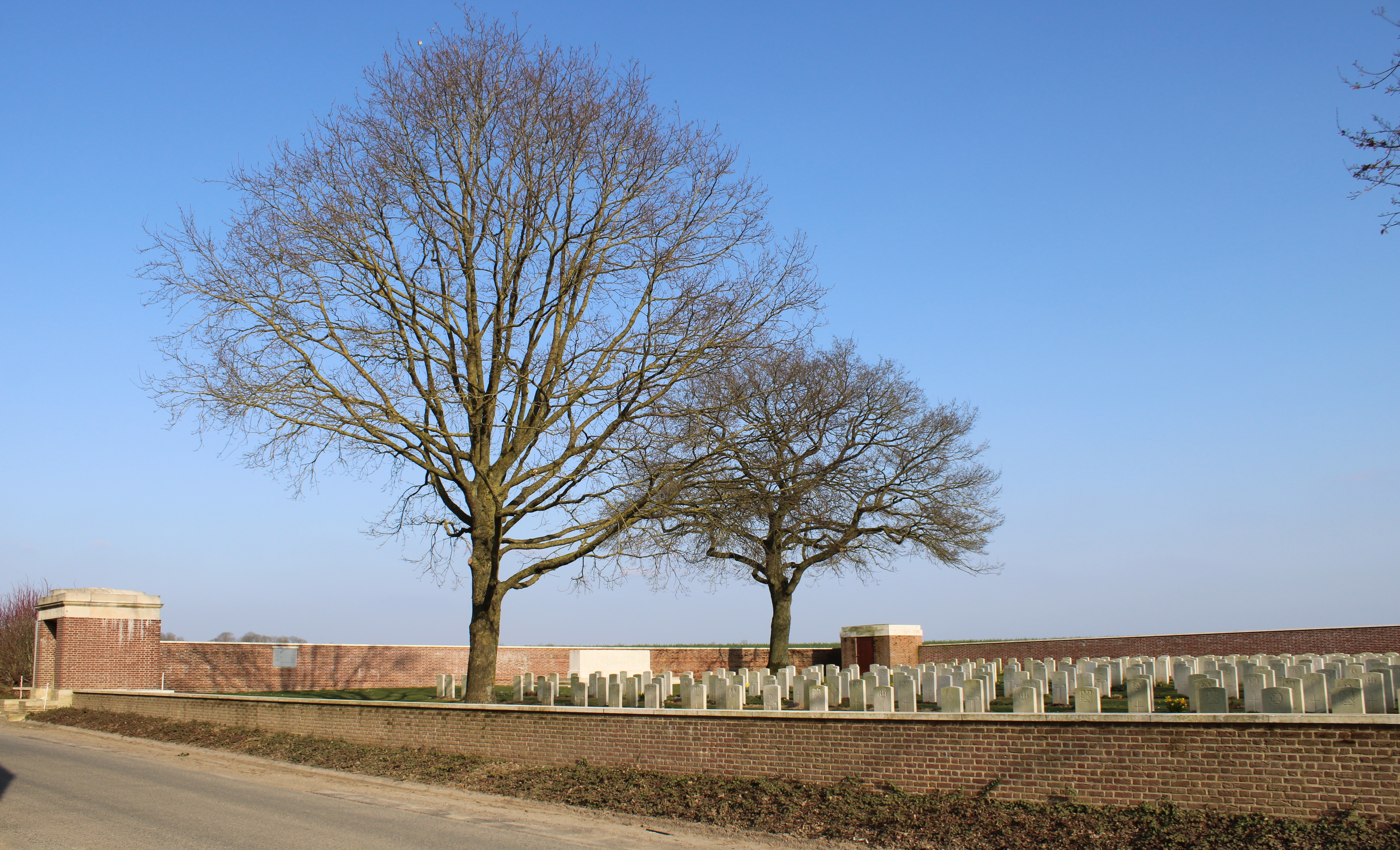

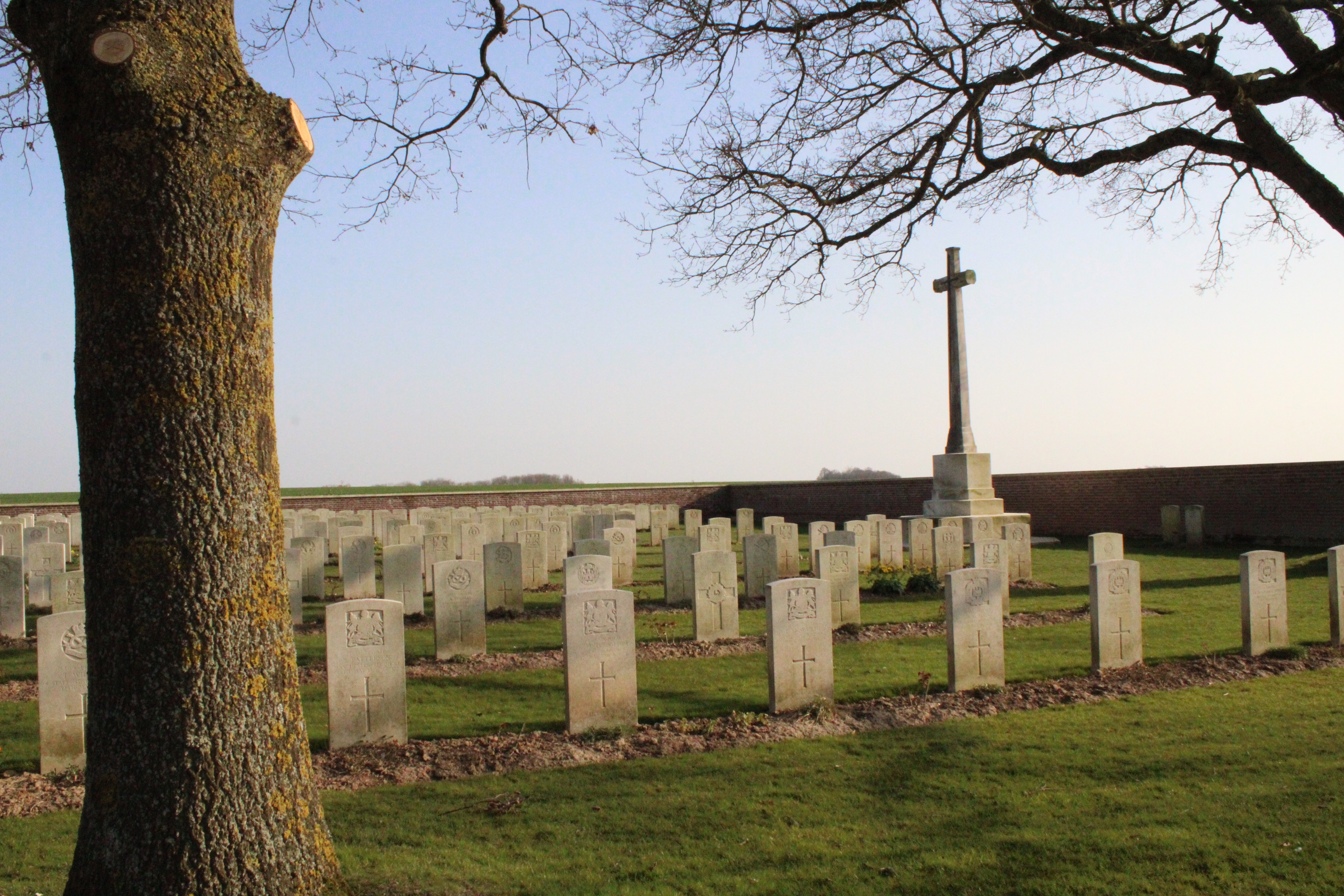

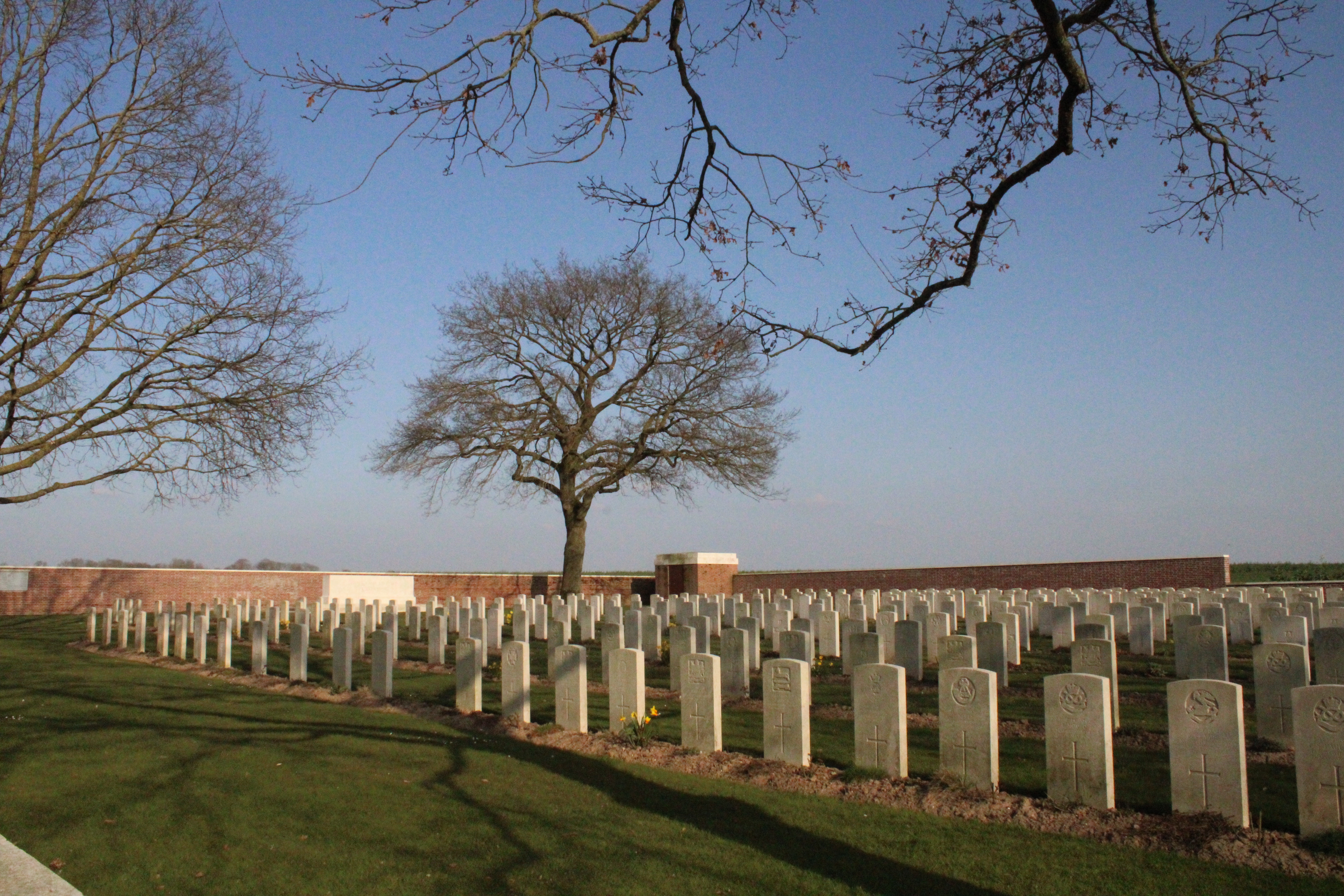

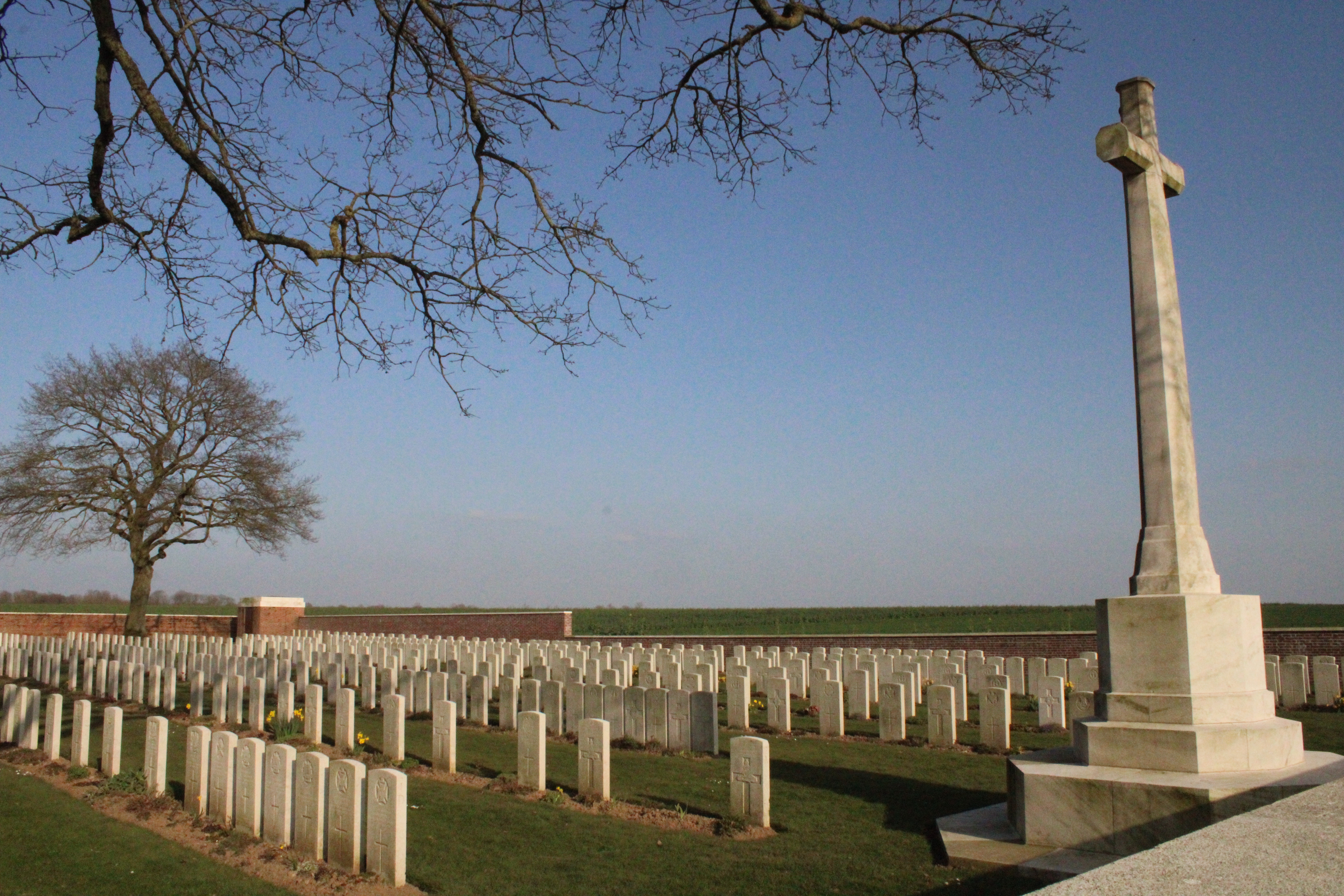

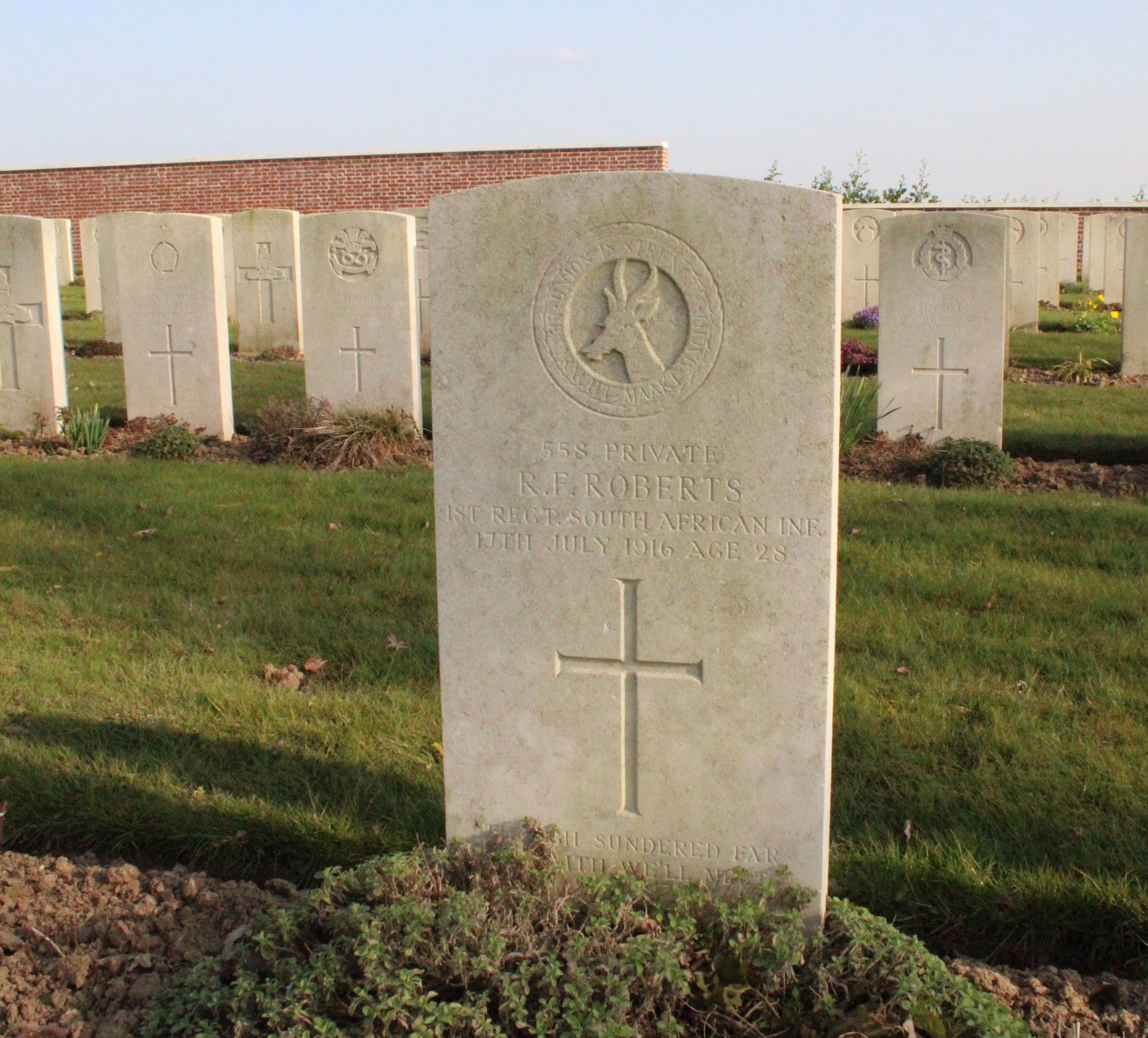

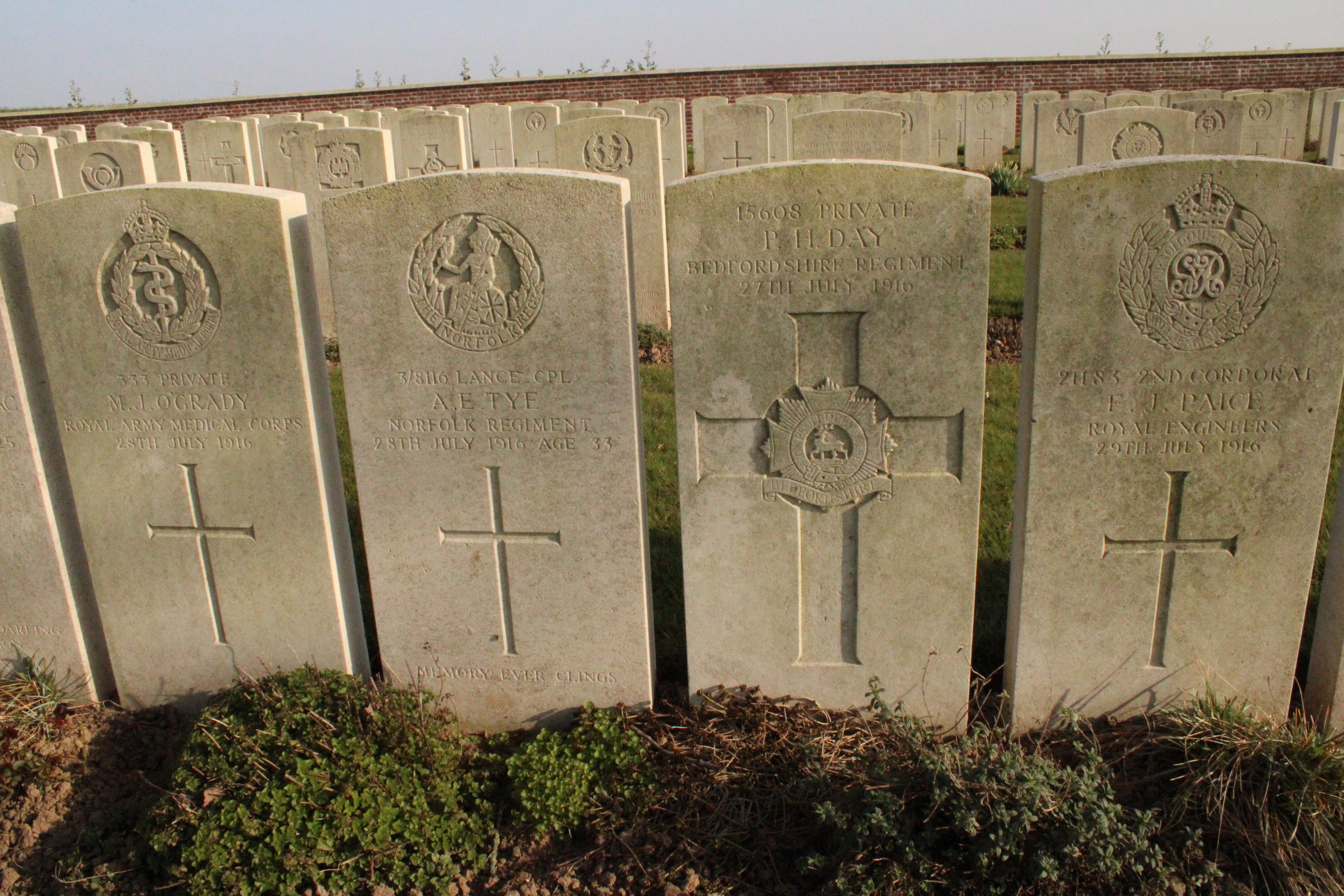

=== Statistics ===
There are a total of 537 burials in the cemetery, of which 525 are identified and 12 are unidentified. There is a special memorial dedicated to two soldiers believed to be buried among the unknown.

Identified Casualties by Nationality
Nationality	Number of Burials
United Kingdom	508
Australia	14
India	2
South Africa	1

Number of Burials by Unit
Royal Fusiliers – City of London Regiment	54	Royal Field Artillery	49
Manchester Regiment	33	Royal Army Medical Corps	23
Grenadier Guards	19	Royal Garrison Artillery	18
Welsh Guards	18	Australian units	14
Royal Engineers	13	King's Royal Rifle Corps	12
2nd Bn. London Regiment – Royal Fusiliers	12	Cheshire Regiment	10
3rd Bn. London Regiment – Royal Fusiliers	10	Royal Army Service Corps	10
Suffolk Regiment	9	South Staffordshire Regiment	9
Middlesex Regiment	9	Machine Gun Corps – Infantry	9
Royal Flying Corps/Royal Air Force	8	Coldstream Guards	7
Rifle Brigade	7	Bedfordshire Regiment	6
East Surrey Regiment	6	Durham Light Infantry	6
4th Bn. London Regiment – Royal Fusiliers	6	6th Bn. London Regiment – City of London Rifles	6
12th Bn. London Regiment – Rangers	6	Duke of Cornwall's Light Infantry	5
King's Liverpool Regiment	5	Northumberland Fusiliers	5
Scots Guards	5	Black Watch – Royal Highlanders	4
Devonshire Regiment	4	King's Own Yorkshire Light Infantry	4
Leicestershire Regiment	4	1st Bn. London Regiment – Royal Fusiliers	4
9th Bn. London Regiment – Queen Victoria's Rifles	4	Royal Scots – Lothian Regiment	4
Royal Sussex Regiment	4	Seaforth Highlanders	4
West Yorkshire Regiment	4	Duke of Wellington – West Riding Regiment	3
Lancashire Fusiliers	3	Norfolk Regiment	3
Royal Horse Artillery	3	Royal Warwickshire Regiment	3
Royal West Kent Regiment – Queen's Own	3	Essex Regiment	2
Gloucestershire Regiment	2	Gordon Highlanders	2
Hampshire Regiment	2	Hertfordshire Regiment	2
Highland Light Infantry	2	Honourable Artillery Company	2
King's Own Scottish Borderers	2	King's Shropshire Light Infantry	2
Leinster Regiment	2	North Staffordshire Regiment	2
Royal Inniskilling Fusiliers	2	Royal Scots Fusiliers	2
Sherwood Foresters – Notts & Derbys Regiment	2	Somerset Light Infantry	2
Army Gymnastic Staff	1	Buffs – East Kent Regiment	1
2nd Dragoon Guards	1	Green Howards – Yorkshire Regiment	1
Guards – Machine Gun Regiment	1	Irish Guards	1
King George's Central India Horse	1	King George's Own Lancers	1
King's Own Royal Lancaster Regiment	1	9th Lancers	1
12th Lancers	1	5th Bn. London Regiment – London Rifle Brigade	1
13th Bn. London Regiment – Kensington	1	14th Bn. London Regiment – London Scottish	1
15th Bn. London Regiment – PWO Civil Service Rifles	1	2nd/4th Bn. London Regiment – Royal Fusiliers	1
2nd/10th Bn. London Regiment	1	Northamptonshire Regiment	1
Royal Dublin Fusiliers	1	Royal Irish Regiment	1
Royal Marine Artillery	1	Royal Munster Fusiliers	1
Royal Welsh Fusiliers	1	Shropshire Yeomany	1
South African Regiment	1	South Lancashire Regiment	1
York & Lancaster Regiment	1		
