= 1920 Australasian Championships – Singles =

Singles
- 1920 Australasian Championships

Final
- Champion: (Australia) Pat O'Hara Wood
- Runner-up: (Australia) Ronald Thomas
- Score: 6–3, 4–6, 6–8, 6–1, 6–3

Details
- Draw: 26

Events
Singles	Doubles
- Australasian Championships

Pat O'Hara Wood defeated Ronald Thomas 6–3, 4–6, 6–8, 6–1, 6–3 in the final to win the men's singles tennis title at the 1920 Australasian Championships.

== Draw ==
=== Key ===
- Q = Qualifier
- WC = Wild card
- LL = Lucky loser
- r = Retired

Quarterfinals
(Australia) Pat O'Hara Wood	6	6	6
(Australia) H. Utz	1	1	2
(Australia) A. Roy Taylor	3	3	6	6	6
(Australia) A. Scott	6	6	2	2	3
(Australia) Ronald Thomas	6	6	6
(Australia) G. O'Dea	0	2	4
(Australia) Horace Rice	6	6	6
(Australia) C. Gurner	2	2	2

Semifinals
(Australia) Pat O'Hara Wood	6	6	7
(Australia) A. Roy Taylor	3	1	5
(Australia) Ronald Thomas	6	4	6	5	6
(Australia) Horace Rice	4	6	1	7	2

Finals
(Australia) Pat O'Hara Wood	6	4	6	6	6
(Australia) Ronald Thomas	3	6	8	1	3

=== Top half ===
First round
(Australia) K. Roberts	9	6	2	0	6
(Australia) R. Berriman	7	1	6	6	2
(Australia) H. Utz	6	6	5	3	11
(Australia) J. Penny	4	4	7	6	9
(Australia) A. R. Taylor	7	6	6	5	6
(Australia) E. Jordan	9	3	3	7	3
(Australia) E. Rowe	6	8	6
(Australia) G Hone	3	6	2
(Australia) A. Scott	8	6	6
(Australia) E. Hicks	6	2	4

Second round
(Australia) P. O'Hara Wood	6	6	6
(Australia) K. Roberts	0	2	2
(Australia) H. Utz	6	6	6
(Australia) R. Paxton	2	1	1
(Australia) A. R. Taylor	6	6	9	6
(Australia) E. Rowe	2	4	11	3
(Australia) A. Scott	6	4	6	6
(Australia) R. Billing	4	6	3	4

Quarterfinals
(Australia) P O'Hara Wood	6	6	6
(Australia) H. Utz	1	1	2
(Australia) A. R. Taylor	6	6	2	2	6
(Australia) A. Scott	3	3	6	6	3

Semifinals
(Australia) P O'Hara Wood	6	6	7
(Australia) A. R. Taylor	3	1	5

=== Bottom half ===
First round
(Australia) R. Thomas	w/o
(Australia) E. Richmond
(Australia) S. Milligan	6	6	6
(Australia) F. Bromley	2	2	1
(Australia) G. O'Dea	6	6	6
(Australia) T. Linn	2	0	4
(Australia) H. Rice	6	6	6
(Australia) C. Stuart	3	2	2
(Australia) J. O'Dea	6	6	9
(Australia) A. Pittman	0	2	7

Second round
(Australia) R. Thomas	6	8	6
(Australia) S. Milligan	2	6	0
(Australia) G. O'Dea	6	1	6	6
(Australia) F. Hone	1	6	2	3
(Australia) H. Rice	7	6	6
(Australia) J. O'Dea	5	1	1
(Australia) C. Gurner	6	7	7
(Australia) F. Barritt	1	5	5

Quarterfinals
(Australia) R. Thomas	6	6	6
(Australia) G. O'Dea	0	2	4
(Australia) H. Rice	6	6	6
(Australia) C. Gurner	2	2	2

Semifinals
(Australia) R. Thomas	6	4	6	5	6
(Australia) H. Rice	4	6	1	7	2

Preceded by 1919 U.S. National Championships – Men's singles	Grand Slam men's singles	Succeeded by 1920 Wimbledon Championships – Men's singles
