= Algernon Kingscote =

British tennis player

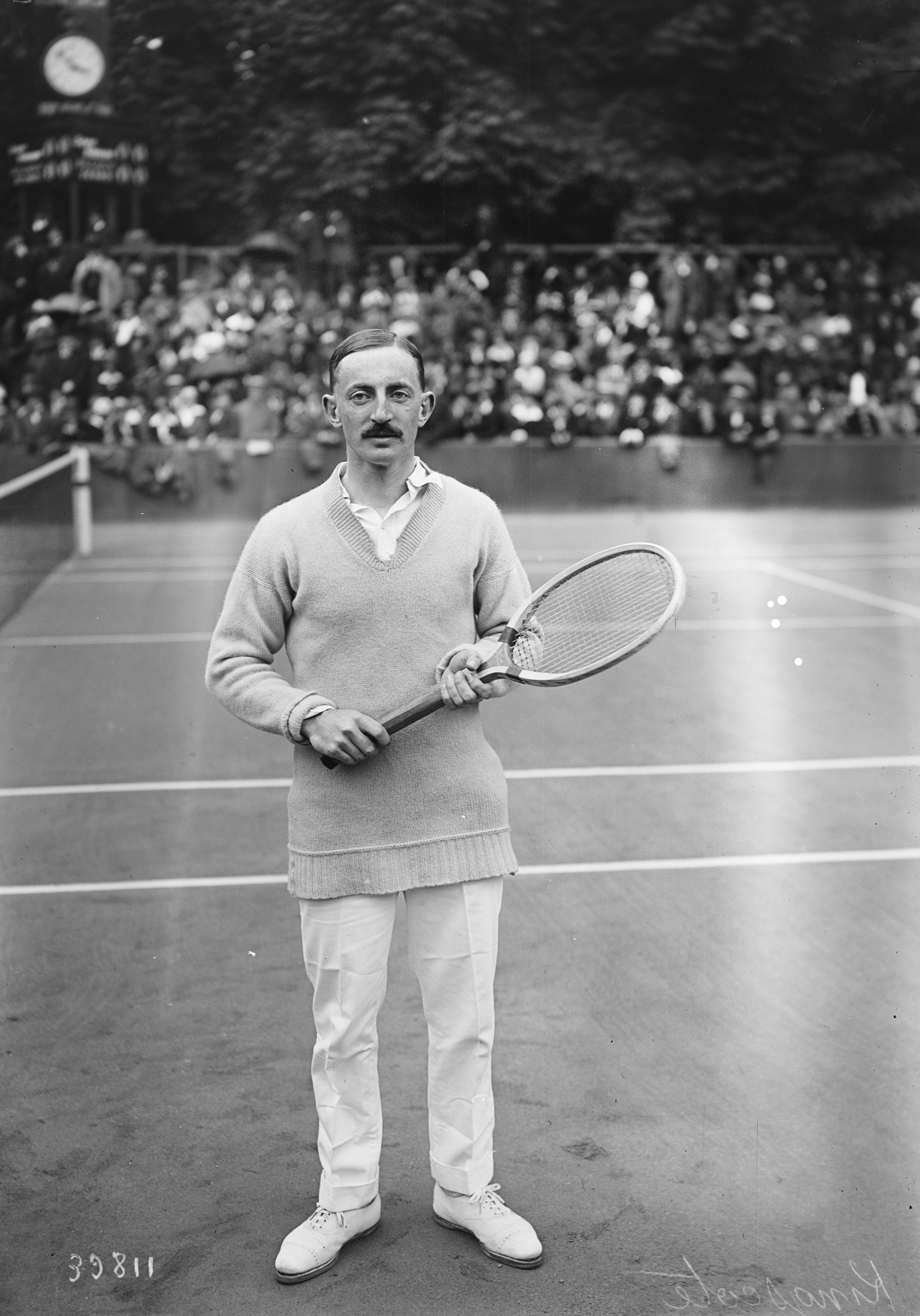
- Kingscote in 1914
- Full name: Algernon Robert Fitzhardinge Kingscote
- Country (sports): United Kingdom
- Born: 3 December 1888 Bangalore, India
- Died: 21 December 1964 (aged 76) Woking, Surrey, Great Britain
- Plays: Right-handed (one-handed backhand)

Singles
- Career record: 93–23
- Career titles: 13
- Highest ranking: No. 3 (1920, A. Wallis Myers)

Grand Slam singles results
- Australian Open: W (1919)
- Wimbledon: F (1919^{(AC)})
- French Open Senior: 1R (1930)

Other tournaments
- WHCC: QF (1914)
- Olympic Games: 4R (1924)

Doubles

Grand Slam doubles results
- Australian Open: SF (1919)
- Wimbledon: F (1920)

Other doubles tournaments
- WHCC: F (1914)
- Olympic Games: 1R (1924)

Algernon Robert Fitzhardinge "Algy" Kingscote MC (3 December 1888 – 21 December 1964) was a British tennis player, who won the Men's Singles event at the Australasian Championships in 1919. Kingscote also competed in the 1924 Summer Olympics in Paris. He was born in Bangalore, India, in 1888.

== Tennis career ==
Algernon Kingscote learned playing tennis on the courts of the Château-d'Œx Club in Switzerland, where he won numerous championships. In his early years he trained with American teenager player R. Norris Williams. He was crowned Swiss champion in 1908 and champion of Bengal in 1913. He held the Kent Championships title for four consecutive years between 1919 and 1922 and in total won the title six times. At Wimbledon 1919, Kingscote beat William Laurentz, Max Decugis and Pat O'Hara Wood before losing in the all comers final to Gerald Patterson. He won the singles title at the 1919 Australasian Championships, along with the first Anthony Wilding Memorial Medal, beating Eric Pockley of New South Wales in the final in straight sets. In the 1920 Wimbledon Championships he reached the doubles final alongside James Cecil Parke but eventually lost to the team of Garland–Williams. In 1921 Kingscote was a runner-up at the Monte-Carlo Championships losing to fellow countryman Gordon Lowe in four sets. He represented Great Britain in the Davis Cup seven times between 1919 and 1924 compiling a 9–8 win–loss record. In the 1922 Wimbledon Championships first round against Leslie Godfree they established the routine of saluting the Royal Box by bowing in front of it, a tradition that was in effect to 2003. He won the London Championships in 1924 beating Gordon Lowe in four sets in the final.

=== Playing style ===
U.S. Championships quarterfinalist American Dean Mathey described his style as "well rounded" in 1920 at the time when he was considered the best British outdoors player. He favored volleying and had good ground strokes. His service was fair but his game lacked speed and strength. The next year professional world number one player Bill Tilden agreed with Mathey that his game is well rounded but lacks speed. He described his hitting as well-paced, his service as a fast sliced, well placed, paced, twisted and cleverly disguised and his style as a defensive one relying mostly on his half-volley baseline returns. He dedicated Kingscote's court positioning and good volleying skills as a compensation for Kingscote's rather short appearance. Kingscote adapted to the combination of net attack and baseline game, which Tilden praised as a key factor of successful tennis style. His favorite shot was the cross court forehand shot. His backhand was steady, accurate and deceptive.

== Personal life ==
Algernon Kingscote was born on 3 December 1888 to Lieutenant-Colonel Howard Kingscote (b. 29 April 1845, d. 17 March 1917) and famous novelist Adeline Wolff known as Lucas Cleeve. He had two siblings, Henry Robert Fitzhardinge Kingscote (b. 1 October 1887) and Iris Adeline Harriett Augusta Kingscote (b. 5 August 1886, d. 8 June 1970). Algernon was the grandson of philanthropist and amateur cricketer Henry Robert Kingscote. Like his father, Algernon Kingscote joined the army in 1910 serving for the Royal Garrison Artillery. He was a Second Lieutenant when stationing at Plympton, Devon in 1911. He was engaged in World War I where he fought at the First Battle of the Aisne earning the rank of Lieutenant-Colonel and the award of Military Cross. After the war he went back competing in tennis tournaments and was appointed the captain of the Great Britain Davis Cup team, while still serving in the army as a colonel. He married Marjorie Paton Hindley, daughter of Douglas C. P. Hindley, on 9 September 1919, and had two daughters Rachel and Marjorie and later a son David, who died on 5 September 1945 at age 20 at Burma, killed in action. At the age of 52 at the outbreak of World War II he was sent back to action again. He died on 21 December 1964 Woking, Surrey, Great Britain.

== Grand Slam finals ==
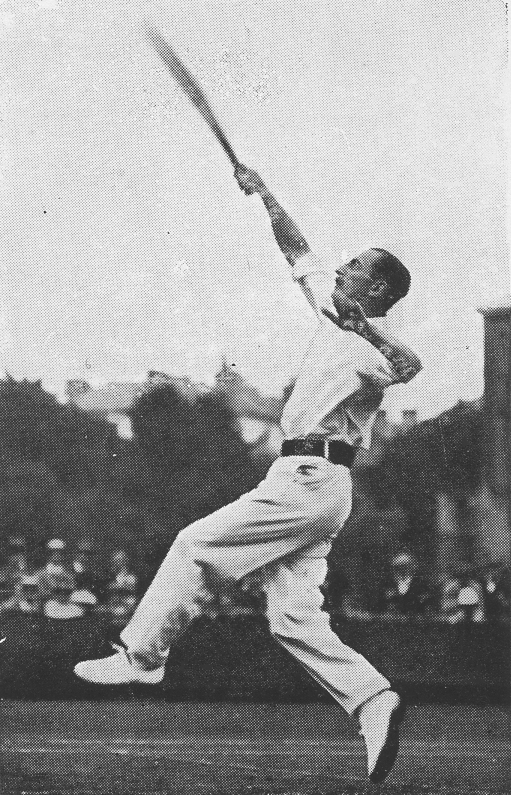
Algernon Kingscote smash

=== Singles ===
Result	Year	Championship	Surface	Opponent	Score
Win	1919	Australasian Championships	Grass	(Australia) Eric Pockley	6–4, 6–0, 6–3
Loss	1919	Wimbledon	Grass	(Australia) Gerald Patterson	6–2, 6–1, 6–3

=== Doubles ===
Result	Year	Championship	Surface	Partner	Opponents	Score
Loss	1920	Wimbledon	Grass	(Republic of Ireland) James Cecil Parke	(United States) Chuck Garland (United States) R. Norris Williams	6–4, 4–6, 5–7, 2–6

== World Championships finals ==
=== Doubles ===
Result	Year	Championship	Surface	Partner	Opponents	Score
Loss	1914	World Hard Court Championships	Clay	(United Kingdom) Arthur Gore	(France) Max Decugis (France) Maurice Germot	6–1, 11–9, 6–8, 6–2

== Sources ==
- Bill Tilden (1921). The Art of Lawn Tennis (second ed.). London, United Kingdom: |Methuen & Co. ISBN 1421900106. Retrieved 11 June 2012.
