= 1920 Australasian Championships =

- Date: 15–20 March 1920
- Edition: 13th
- Category: Grand Slam (ITF)
- Surface: Grass
- Location: Adelaide, South Australia, Australia
- Venue: Adelaide Oval

Champions

Singles
- (Australia) Pat O'Hara Wood

Doubles
- (Australia) Pat O'Hara Wood / (Australia) Ronald Thomas
- Australasian Championships

The 1920 Australasian Championships was a tennis tournament that took place on outdoor Grass courts at the Adelaide Oval, Adelaide, Australia, from 15 March to 20 March. It was the 13th edition of the Australian Championships (now known as the Australian Open), the 2nd held in Adelaide, and the first Grand Slam tournament of the season. The singles titles was won by Australian Pat O'Hara Wood.

== Finals ==
=== Singles ===
(Australia) Pat O'Hara Wood defeated (Australia) Ronald Thomas 6–3, 4–6, 6–8, 6–1, 6–3

=== Doubles ===
(Australia) Pat O'Hara Wood / (Australia) Ronald Thomas defeated (Australia) Horace Rice / (Australia) Roy Taylor 6–1, 6–0, 7–5

Preceded by 1919 Australasian Championships	Grand Slams	Succeeded by 1920 Wimbledon Championships
