= Roy Taylor (tennis) =

Australian tennis and lacrosse player

- Full name: A. Roy Taylor
- Country (sports): Australia
- Born: 1883; Australia
- Died: 27 October 1934 (aged 51); Adelaide, South Australia, Australia
- Turned pro: 1903 (amateur tour)
- Retired: 1920

Singles

Grand Slam singles results
- Australian Open: SF (1913, 1920)

Doubles

Grand Slam doubles results
- Australian Open: F (1913, 1920)
- Wimbledon: 1R (1925)

Roy Taylor (1883–1934) was an Australian tennis player and also represented Australia at lacrosse. He was a stockbroker by profession.

== Tennis career ==
Taylor won the South Australian State singles championship in 1912, 1913 and 1919. He made his debut at the Australasian Championships in 1910 (losing in round one to Harry Parker). In the 1913 semi finals, the big serving Taylor led Parker 5-1 in the third set (sets were 1-1) when he sprained his ankle. Although Taylor managed the cling on to take the third set, he lost the next two easily. In 1914 Taylor lost in the quarter-finals to Rupert Wertheim. In 1919 Taylor led Gerald Patterson two sets to 0 in round two before having to retire. In 1920 Taylor lost in the semis to Pat O'Hara Wood.

Taylor died suddenly while sitting at home with his family in 1934 aged 51.

== Grand Slam finals ==
=== Doubles: (2 runner-ups) ===
Result	Year	Championship	Surface	Partner	Opponents	Score
Loss	1913	Australasian Championships	Grass	(New Zealand) Harry Parker	(Australia) Alf Hedeman (Australia) Ernie Parker	6–8, 6–4, 4–6, 4–6
Loss	1920	Australasian Championships	Grass	(Australia) Horace Rice	(Australia) Pat O'Hara Wood (Australia) Ronald Thomas	1–6, 0–6, 5–7
