= 1914 Australasian Championships =

- Date: 23–28 November 1914
- Edition: 10th
- Category: Grand Slam (ITF)
- Surface: Grass
- Location: Melbourne, Victoria, Australia
- Venue: Warehouseman's Cricket Ground

Champions

Singles
- (Australia) Arthur O'Hara Wood

Doubles
- (Australia) Ashley Campbell / (Australia) Gerald Patterson
- Australasian Championships

The 1914 Australasian Championships was a tennis tournament that took place on outdoor Grass courts at the Warehouseman's Cricket Ground in Melbourne, Australia, from 23 November to 28 November. It was the 10th edition of the Australasian Championships (now known as the Australian Open), the third held in Melbourne, and the third Grand Slam tournament of the year. The singles title was won by Australian Arthur O'Hara Wood.

== Finals ==
=== Singles ===
(Australia) Arthur O'Hara Wood defeated (Australia) Gerald Patterson 6–4, 6–3, 5–7, 6–1

=== Doubles ===
(Australia) Ashley Campbell / (Australia) Gerald Patterson defeated (Australia) Rodney Heath / (Australia) Arthur O'Hara Wood 7–5, 3–6, 6–3, 6–3

Preceded by 1914 U.S. National Championships	Grand Slams	Succeeded by 1915 Australasian Championships
