= Arthur O'Hara Wood =

Australian tennis player (1890–1918)

- Full name: Arthur Holroyd O'Hara Wood
- Country (sports): Australia
- Born: 10 January 1890 Melbourne, Australia
- Died: 6 October 1918 (aged 28) Saint-Quentin, France

Grand Slam singles results
- Australian Open: W (1914)

Grand Slam doubles results
- Australian Open: F (1914)

Major Arthur Holroyd O'Hara Wood (10 January 1890 – 6 October 1918) was an Australian male tennis player and Royal Air Force pilot who was killed during the First World War.

O'Hara Wood was educated at Melbourne Grammar School and attended Trinity College, Melbourne University in 1908.

O'Hara Wood won the men's singles title at the New South Wales Championships in 1913 and the Victorian Championships in 1914. In 1914 he reached the final of the Australasian Championships, played in Melbourne, where he faced his compatriot Gerald Patterson. O'Hara Wood used a variety of pace and spins to beat Patterson in four sets. Arthur's brother Pat O'Hara Wood was also a tennis player and won the Australasian Championships in 1920 and 1923.

In 1915, after the outbreak of the First World War, O'Hara Wood joined the Royal Flying Corps. He saw service in France and did instructional work in England in 1916. He was temporarily transferred to the Australian Flying Corps in France, then on 17 July 1918, when he celebrated his third anniversary at the war, he was appointed to an important post at flying school in England.

In 1918, Major O'Hara Wood was in command of 46 Squadron when during a patrol over Saint-Quentin on 4 October 1918, another aircraft flew into his. He died on 6 October 1918, at the 37th Casualty Clearing Station from multiple injuries. He is buried at the Bronfay Farm Military Cemetery in Bray-sur-Somme.

== Grand Slam finals ==
=== Singles (1 title) ===
Result	Year	Championship	Surface	Opponent	Score
Win	1914	Australasian Championships	Grass	(Australia) Gerald Patterson	6–4, 6–3, 5–7, 6–1

=== Doubles (1 runner-up) ===
Result	Year	Championship	Surface	Partner	Opponents	Score
Loss	1914	Australasian Championships	Grass	(Australia) Rodney Heath	(Australia) Ashley Campbell (Australia) Gerald Patterson	5–7, 6–3, 3–6, 3–6
