= Eric Pockley =

Australian tennis player

- Full name: Eric Osbaldiston Pockley
- Country (sports): Australia
- Born: 18 May 1876 Killara, New South Wales, Australia
- Died: 11 November 1956 (aged 80) Avalon, New South Wales, Australia
- Turned pro: 1900 (amateur tour)
- Retired: 1919

Singles

Grand Slam singles results
- Australian Open: F (1919)
- Wimbledon: 3R (1911)

Doubles

Grand Slam doubles results
- Australian Open: 1R (1919)
- Wimbledon: SF (1911)

Eric Osbaldiston Pockley (18 May 1876 – 11 November 1956) was an Australian tennis player and medical doctor.

Pockley finished runner-up to Algernon Kingscote at the singles event of the 1919 Australasian Championships, the future Australian Open. He also reached the semifinals in 1907 and 1908, and took part in the 1905 Australasian Championships, the inaugural edition of the tournament. He received a bye in the first round and defeated E Robertson in the second round in five sets. In the quarterfinal he was defeated by A Curtis in four sets.

Pockley participated in the singles and doubles events at the 1910 and 1911 Wimbledon Championships. His best performance was reaching the third round in the singles and the semifinal in the doubles, both in 1911.

Pockley, who was born in 1876, used to travel in a dogcart from his home in Killara to Sydney, where he was among the first 12 pupils at the Church of England Grammar School. After graduating from the University of Sydney and serving as resident doctor at the Royal Prince Alfred Hospital, he also studied at Oxford University and in Vienna. Pockley travelled extensively during his life, showing interest in bird behaviour.

== Grand Slam finals ==
=== Singles (1 loss) ===
Result	Year	Championship	Surface	Opponent	Score
Loss	1919	Australasian Championships	Grass	(United Kingdom) Algernon Kingscote	4–6, 0–6, 3–6
