= Pat O'Hara Wood =

Australian tennis player (1891–1961)

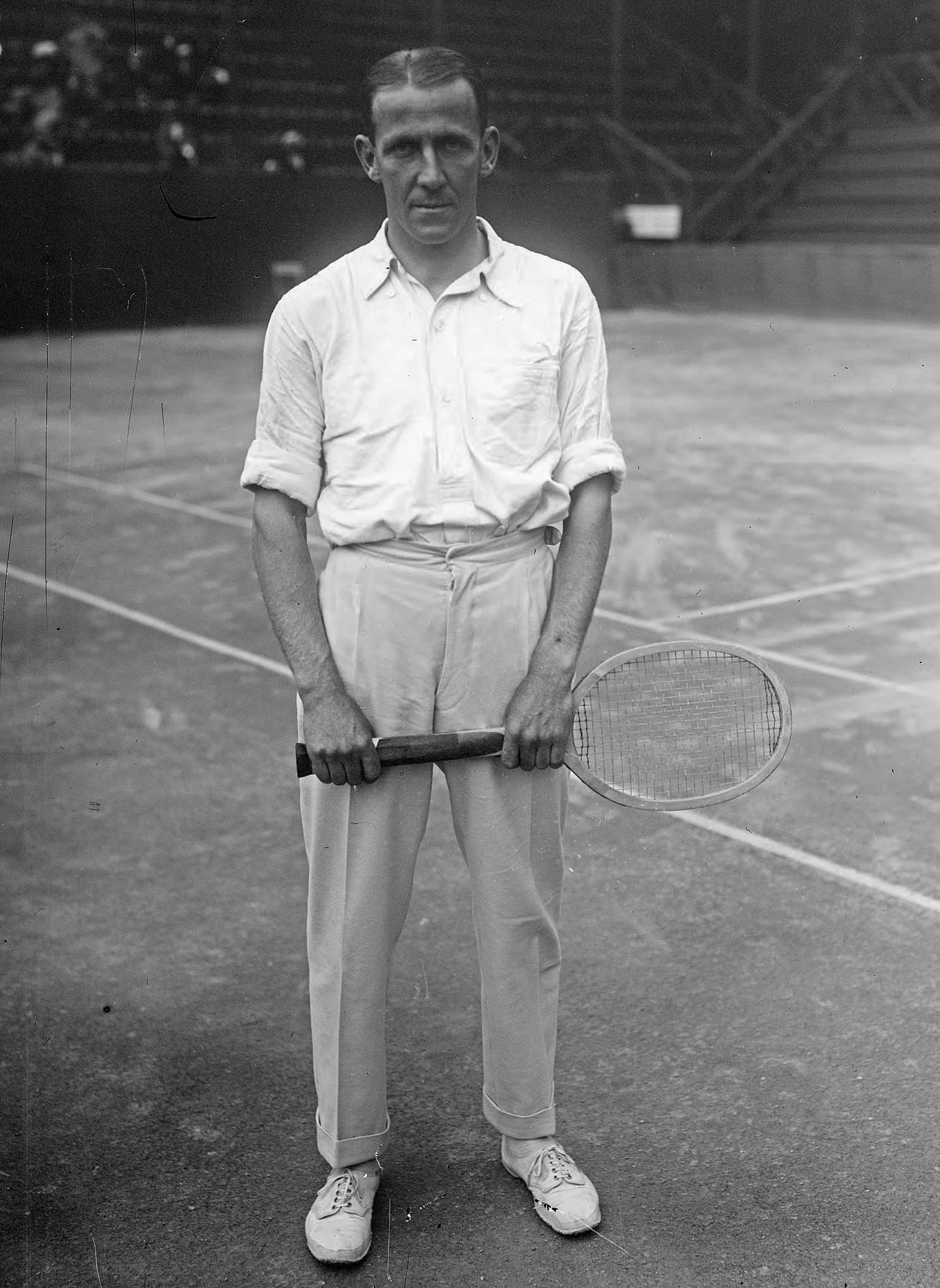
- Full name: Hector O'Hara Wood
- Country (sports): Australia
- Born: 30 April 1891 Melbourne, Australia
- Died: 3 December 1961 (aged 70) Richmond, Australia
- Turned pro: 1913 (amateur tour)
- Retired: 1929
- Plays: Right-handed (one-handed backhand)

Singles
- Career record: 242–55 (81.4%)
- Career titles: 19
- Highest ranking: No. 7 (1922, A. Wallis Myers)

Grand Slam singles results
- Australian Open: W (1920, 1923)
- Wimbledon: QF (1919, 1922)
- US Open: 4R (1922)

Grand Slam doubles results
- Australian Open: W (1919, 1920, 1923, 1925); F (1924, 1926, 1927)
- Wimbledon: W (1919); F (1922)
- US Open: F (1922, 1924)

Grand Slam mixed doubles results
- Wimbledon: W (1922)

Team competitions
- Davis Cup: F (1922^{Ch}, 1923^{Ch}, 1924^{Ch})

Hector "Pat" O'Hara Wood (30 April 1891 – 3 December 1961) was an Australian tennis player.

O'Hara Wood was born in St Kilda, a suburb of Melbourne, Victoria. He is best known for his two victories at the Australasian Championships (now the Australian Open) in 1920 and 1923. Pat was quick around the court, had textbook groundstrokes, sharp volleys and a solid serve. He died in 1961, aged seventy in Richmond, Australia. His brother Arthur O'Hara Wood (1890–1918) was also an Australian tennis player and won the 1914 Australasian Championships.

After attending Melbourne Grammar School, he entered Trinity College (University of Melbourne) in 1911, where he excelled at cricket as well as tennis, leading the Trinity College team to a memorable victory against Ormond College in March 1911, where he made 167 not out. In 1916, as a 23-year-old law student, he enlisted as an officer in the Australian Army. In 1919, as Captain Pat O'Hara-Wood, he and Bombardier Randolph Lycett won the doubles event at the Inter-Allied Games in Paris.

On 3 August 1923 he married Australian tennis player Meryl Waxman.

== Grand Slam finals ==
=== Singles: 2 titles ===
Result	Year	Championship	Surface	Opponent	Score
Win	1920	Australasian Championships	Grass	(Australia) Ronald Thomas	6–3, 4–6, 6–8, 6–1, 6–3
Win	1923	Australasian Championships	Grass	(Australia) Bert St. John	6–1, 6–1, 6–3

=== Doubles: 11 (5 titles, 6 runners-up) ===
Result	Year	Championship	Surface	Partner	Opponents	Score
Win	1919	Australasian Championships	Grass	(Australia) Ronald Thomas	(Australia) James Anderson (United Kingdom) Arthur Lowe	7–5, 6–1, 7–9, 3–6, 6–3
Win	1919	Wimbledon	Grass	(Australia) Ronald Thomas	(Australia) Rodney Heath (United Kingdom) Randolph Lycett	6–4, 6–2, 4–6, 6–2
Win	1920	Australasian Championships	Grass	(Australia) Ronald Thomas	(Australia) Horace Rice (Australia) Roy Taylor	6–1, 6–0, 7–5
Loss	1922	Wimbledon	Grass	(Australia) Gerald Patterson	(Australia) James Anderson (United Kingdom) Randolph Lycett	6–3, 9–7, 4–6, 3–6, 9–11
Loss	1922	U.S. National Championships	Grass	(Australia) Gerald Patterson	(United States) Vincent Richards (United States) Bill Tilden	6–4, 1–6, 3–6, 4–6
Win	1923	Australasian Championships	Grass	(Australia) Bert St. John	(Australia) Dudley Bullough (Australia) Horace Rice	6–4, 6–3, 3–6, 6–0
Loss	1924	Australasian Championships	Grass	(Australia) Gerald Patterson	(Australia) James Anderson (Australia) Norman Brookes	2–6, 4–6, 3–6
Loss	1924	U.S. National Championships	Grass	(Australia) Gerald Patterson	(United States) Howard Kinsey (United States) Robert Kinsey	5–7, 7–5, 9–7, 3–6, 4–6
Win	1925	Australasian Championships	Grass	(Australia) Gerald Patterson	(Australia) James Anderson (Australia) Fred Kalms	6–4, 8–6, 7–5
Loss	1926	Australasian Championships	Grass	(Australia) James Anderson	(Australia) John Hawkes (Australia) Gerald Patterson	1–6, 4–6, 2–6
Loss	1927	Australian Championships	Grass	(Australia) Ian McInnes	(Australia) John Hawkes (Australia) Gerald Patterson	6–8, 2–6, 1–6

=== Mixed Doubles: 1 title ===
Result	Year	Championship	Surface	Partner	Opponents	Score
Win	1922	Wimbledon	Grass	(France) Suzanne Lenglen	(United States) Elizabeth Ryan (United Kingdom) Randolph Lycett	6–4, 6–3
