= Ronald Thomas (tennis) =

Australian tennis player (1888–1936)

- Full name: Ronald Victor Thomas
- Country (sports): Australia
- Born: 7 August 1888 Hammond, South Australia
- Died: 30 December 1936 (aged 48) Adelaide, Australia

Grand Slam singles results
- Australian Open: F (1920)
- Wimbledon: QF (1919)

Grand Slam doubles results
- Australian Open: W (1919, 1920)
- Wimbledon: W (1919)

Grand Slam mixed doubles results
- Wimbledon: SF (1919)

Ronald Victor Thomas (7 August 1888 – 30 December 1936) was an Australian tennis player. He competed at the 1920 Summer Olympics.

Thomas won two doubles titles at the Australasian Championships (now the Australian Open), in 1919 and 1920, and one doubles title at the 1919 Wimbledon Championships. Thomas also finished as runner-up in men's singles at the 1920 Australasian Championships. In the semi finals he beat Horace Rice by serving well and coming to the net at every opportunity, but he was pushed to five sets by the baseliner Rice before winning. The final between Thomas and Pat O'Hara Wood was played in a strong wind and O'Hara Wood won in five sets.

== Grand Slam finals ==
=== Singles: 1 runner-up ===
Result	Year	Championship	Surface	Opponent	Score
Loss	1920	Australasian Championships	Grass	(Australia) Pat O'Hara Wood	3–6, 6–4, 8–6, 1–6, 3–6

=== Doubles: 3 titles ===
Result	Year	Championship	Surface	Partner	Opponents	Score
Win	1919	Australasian Championships	Grass	(Australia) Pat O'Hara Wood	(Australia) James Anderson (Australia) Arthur Lowe	7–5, 6–1, 7–9, 3–6, 6–3
Win	1919	Wimbledon	Grass	(Australia) Pat O'Hara Wood	(Australia) Rodney Heath (United Kingdom) Randolph Lycett	6–4, 6–2, 4–6, 6–2
Win	1920	Australasian Championships	Grass	(Australia) Pat O'Hara Wood	(Australia) Horace Rice (Australia) Roy Taylor	6–1, 6–0, 7–5
