= 1937 in tennis =

This page covers all the important events in the sport of tennis in 1937. It provides the results of notable tournaments throughout the year on both the men's and women's ILTF tennis circuits.

== Australian Open ==
Category	Champion(s)	Finalist(s)	Score
Men's singles	(Australia) Vivian McGrath	(Australia) John Bromwich	6–3, 1–6, 6–0, 2–6, 6–1
Women's singles	(Australia) Nancye Wynne	(Australia) Emily Hood Westacott	6–3, 5–7, 6–4
Men's doubles	(Australia) Adrian Quist (Australia) Don Turnbull	(Australia) John Bromwich (Australia) Jack Harper	6–2, 9–7, 1–6, 6–8, 6–4
Women's doubles	(Australia) Thelma Coyne (Australia) Nancye Wynne	(Australia) Nell Hall Hopman (Australia) Emily Hood Westacott	6–2, 6–2
Mixed doubles	(Australia) Nell Hall Hopman (Australia) Harry Hopman	(Australia) Dorothy Stevenson (Australia) Don Turnbull	3–6, 6–3, 6–2

== French Open ==
Category	Champion(s)	Finalist(s)	Score
Men's singles	(Germany) Henner Henkel	(United Kingdom) Bunny Austin	6–1, 6–4, 6–3
Women's singles	(Denmark) Hilde Sperling	(France) Simonne Mathieu	6–2, 6–4
Men's doubles	(Germany) Gottfried von Cramm (Germany) Henner Henkel	(South Africa) Vernon Kirby (South Africa) Norman Farquharson	6–4, 7–5, 3–6, 6–1
Women's doubles	(France) Simonne Mathieu (United Kingdom) Billie Yorke	(United States) Dorothy Andrus (France) Sylvie Jung Henrotin	3–6, 6–2, 6–2
Mixed doubles	(France) Simonne Mathieu (France) Yvon Petra	(Germany) Marie-Luise Horn (France) Roland Journu	7–5, 7–5

== Wimbledon ==
Category	Champion(s)	Finalist(s)	Score
Men's singles	(United States) Don Budge	(Germany) Gottfried von Cramm	6–3, 6–4, 6–2
Women's singles	(United Kingdom) Dorothy Round	(Poland) Jadwiga Jędrzejowska	6–2, 2–6, 7–5
Men's doubles	(United States) Don Budge (United States) Gene Mako	(United Kingdom) Pat Hughes (United Kingdom) Raymond Tuckey	6–0, 6–4, 6–8, 6-1
Women's doubles	(France) Simonne Mathieu (United Kingdom) Billie Yorke	(United Kingdom) Phyllis King (United Kingdom) Elsie Pittman	6–3, 6–3
Mixed doubles	(United States) Don Budge (United States) Alice Marble	(France) Yvon Petra (France) Simonne Mathieu	6–4, 6–1

== US Open ==
Category	Champion(s)	Finalist(s)	Score
Men's singles	(United States) Don Budge	(Germany) Gottfried von Cramm	6–1, 7–9, 6–1, 3–6, 6–1
Women's singles	(Chile) Anita Lizana	(Poland) Jadwiga Jędrzejowska	6–4, 6–2
Men's doubles	(Germany) Gottfried von Cramm (Germany) Henner Henkel	(United States) Don Budge (United States) Gene Mako	6–4, 7–5, 6–4
Women's doubles	(United States) Sarah Palfrey Cooke (United States) Alice Marble	(United States) Marjorie Gladman Van Ryn (United States) Carolin Babcock	7–5, 6–4
Mixed doubles	(United States) Sarah Palfrey Cooke (United States) Don Budge	(France) Sylvie Jung Henrotin (France) Yvon Petra	6–2, 8–10, 6–0
