= 1936 in tennis =

This page covers all the important events in the sport of tennis in 1936. It provides the results of notable tournaments throughout the year on both the men's and women's ILTF tennis circuits.

== Australian Open ==
Category	Champion(s)	Finalist(s)	Score
Men's singles	(Australia) Adrian Quist	(Australia) Jack Crawford	6–2, 6–3, 4–6, 3–6, 9–7
Women's singles	(Australia) Joan Hartigan	(Australia) Nancye Wynne	6–4, 6–4
Men's doubles	(Australia) Adrian Quist (Australia) Don Turnbull	(Australia) Jack Crawford (Australia) Vivian McGrath	6–8, 6–2, 6–1, 3–6, 6–2
Women's doubles	(Australia) Thelma Coyne (Australia) Nancye Wynne	(Australia) May Blick (Australia) Kath Woodward	6–2, 6–4
Mixed doubles	(Australia) Nell Hall Hopman (Australia) Harry Hopman	(Australia) May Blick (Australia) Abel Kay	6–2, 6–0

== French Open ==
Category	Champion(s)	Finalist(s)	Score
Men's singles	(Germany) Gottfried von Cramm	(United Kingdom) Fred Perry	6–0, 2–6, 6–2, 2–6, 6–0
Women's singles	(Denmark) Hilde Sperling	(France) Simonne Mathieu	6–3, 6–4
Men's doubles	(France) Jean Borotra (France) Marcel Bernard	(United Kingdom) Charles Tuckey (United Kingdom) Pat Hughes	6–2, 3–6, 9–7, 6–1
Women's doubles	(France) Simonne Mathieu (United Kingdom) Billie Yorke	(United Kingdom) Susan Noel (Poland) Jadwiga Jędrzejowska	2–6, 6–4, 6–4
Mixed doubles	(United Kingdom) Billie Yorke (France) Marcel Bernard	(France) Sylvie Jung Henrotin (France) André Martin-Legeay	7–5, 6–8, 6–3

== Wimbledon ==
Category	Champion(s)	Finalist(s)	Score
Men's singles	(United Kingdom) Fred Perry	(Germany) Gottfried von Cramm	6–1, 6–1, 6–0
Women's singles	(United States) Helen Jacobs	(Denmark) Hilde Sperling	6–2, 4–6, 7–5
Men's doubles	(United Kingdom) Pat Hughes (United Kingdom) Raymond Tuckey	(United Kingdom) Charles Hare (United Kingdom) Frank Wilde	6–4, 3–6, 7–9, 6–1, 6–4
Women's doubles	(United Kingdom) Freda James (United Kingdom) Kay Stammers	(United States) Sarah Fabyan (United States) Helen Jacobs	6–2, 6–1
Mixed doubles	(United Kingdom) Fred Perry (United Kingdom) Dorothy Round	(United States) Don Budge (United States) Sarah Fabyan	7–9, 7–5, 6–4

== US Open ==
Category	Champion(s)	Finalist(s)	Score
Men's singles	(United Kingdom) Fred Perry	(United States) Don Budge	2–6, 6–2, 8–6, 1–6, 10–8
Women's singles	(United States) Alice Marble	(United States) Helen Jacobs	4–6, 6–3, 6–2
Men's doubles	(United States) Don Budge (United States) Gene Mako	(United States) Wilmer Allison (United States) John Van Ryn	6–4, 6–2, 6–4
Women's doubles	(United States) Carolin Babcock (United States) Marjorie Gladman Van Ryn	(United States) Helen Hull Jacobs (United States) Sarah Palfrey Cooke	9–7, 2–6, 6–4
Mixed doubles	(United States) Alice Marble (United States) Gene Mako	(United States) Sarah Palfrey Cooke (United States) Don Budge	6–3, 6–2
