= 1940 in tennis =

This page covers all the important events in the sport of tennis in 1940. It provides the results of notable tournaments throughout the year on both the men's and women's ILTF tennis circuits.

== Australian Open ==
Category	Champion(s)	Finalist(s)	Score
Men's singles	(Australia) Adrian Quist	(Australia) Jack Crawford	6–3, 6–1, 6–2
Women's singles	(Australia) Nancye Wynne	(Australia) Thelma Coyne	5–7, 6–4, 6–0
Men's doubles	(Australia) John Bromwich (Australia) Adrian Quist	(Australia) Jack Crawford (Australia) Vivian McGrath	6–3, 7–5, 6–1
Women's doubles	(Australia) Thelma Coyne (Australia) Nancye Wynne	(Australia) Joan Hartigan (Australia) Edie Niemeyer	7–5, 6–2
Mixed doubles	(Australia) Nancye Wynne (Australia) Colin Long	(Australia) Nell Hall Hopman (Australia) Harry Hopman	7–5, 2–6, 6–4

== French Open ==
No event.

== Wimbledon ==
No event.

== US Open ==
Category	Champion(s)	Finalist(s)	Score
Men's singles	(United States) Donald McNeill	(United States) Bobby Riggs	4–6, 6–8, 6–3, 6–3, 7–5
Women's singles	(United States) Alice Marble	(United States) Helen Jacobs	6–2, 6–3
Men's doubles	(United States) Jack Kramer (United States) Ted Schroeder	(United States) Gardnar Mulloy (United States) Henry Prusoff	6–4, 8–6, 9–7
Women's doubles	(United States) Sarah Palfrey Cooke (United States) Alice Marble	(United States) Dorothy Bundy (United States) Marjorie Gladman Van Ryn	6–4, 6–4
Mixed doubles	(United States) Alice Marble (United States) Bobby Riggs	(United States) Dorothy Bundy (United States) Jack Kramer	9–7, 6–1
