= 1937 in sports =

1937 in sports describes the year's events in world sport.

== Alpine skiing ==
FIS Alpine World Ski Championships 7th FIS Alpine World Ski Championships are held at Chamonix, France. The events are a downhill, a slalom and a combined race in both the men's and women's categories. The winners are:

- Men's Downhill – Emile Allais (France)
- Men's Slalom – Emile Allais (France)
- Men's Combined – Emile Allais (France)
- Women's Downhill – Christl Cranz (Germany)
- Women's Slalom – Christl Cranz (Germany)
- Women's Combined – Christl Cranz (Germany)

== American football ==
- NFL Championship – the Washington Redskins won 28–21 over the Chicago Bears at Wrigley Field.
- First Cotton Bowl Classic is played in Dallas.
- Pittsburgh Panthers – college football national championship
- The Cleveland Rams join the National Football League.

== Association football ==
England

- First Division – Manchester City win the 1936–37 title.
- FA Cup – Sunderland beat Preston North End 3–1.

Spain

- La Liga – not contested due to the Spanish Civil War

Germany

- German football championship won by Schalke 04

Italy

- Serie A won by Bologna

Portugal

- Primeira Liga won by S.L. Benfica

France

- French Division 1 won by Olympique de Marseille

Sweden

- Allsvenskan 1936/1937: AIK

== Australian rules football ==
- Victorian Football League
  - 25 September – Geelong wins the 41st VFL Premiership, defeating Collingwood 18.14 (122) to 12.18 (90) in the 1937 VFL Grand Final
  - Brownlow Medal awarded to Dick Reynolds (Essendon)
- South Australian National Football League
  - 2 October – Port Adelaide 13.16 (94) defeat South Adelaide 10.10 (70) to win their second consecutive SANFL premiership.
  - Magarey Medal won by Harold Hawke (North Adelaide)
- Western Australian National Football League
  - 9 October – East Fremantle 14.13 (97) defeat Claremont 13.9 (87) to win their eighteenth premiership.
  - Sandover Medal won by "Scranno" Jenkins (South Fremantle).

== Baseball ==
- World Series – New York Yankees defeat New York Giants, 4–1.
- Hall of Fame election – Continuing toward the goal of 10 initial inductees from the 20th century, voters select Nap Lajoie, Tris Speaker and Cy Young. A special committee selects managers Connie Mack and John McGraw, former league presidents Morgan Bulkeley and Ban Johnson, and pioneer shortstop/promoter George Wright. Selections of nineteenth-century players are postponed.
- Aguilas Cibaenas, a club of Dominican Republic, officially founded in Santiago de los Caballeros on January 28.

== Basketball ==
Events

- Major professional basketball returns with the formation of the National Basketball League.
- Eurobasket 1937 – Lithuania win the second European basketball championship.
- The fifth South American Basketball Championship in Valparaíso and Santiago is won by Chile.
- The first NAIA Division I men's basketball tournament played in Kansas City.

== Boxing ==
Events

- 22 June – Joe Louis defeats James J. Braddock at Chicago by an eighth-round knockout to win the World Heavyweight Championship.
- 30 August – in his first title defence, Louis defeats Tommy Farr at Bronx on a fifteen-round decision

Lineal world champions

- World Heavyweight Championship – James J. Braddock → Joe Louis
- World Light Heavyweight Championship – John Henry Lewis
- World Middleweight Championship – vacant
- World Welterweight Championship – Barney Ross
- World Lightweight Championship – Lou Ambers
- World Featherweight Championship – vacant → Henry Armstrong
- World Bantamweight Championship – Sixto Escobar → Harry Jeffra
- World Flyweight Championship – vacant → Benny Lynch

== Cricket ==
Events

- England tours Australia, losing the five-Test series two games to three, despite winning the first two games.

England

- County Championship – Yorkshire
- Minor Counties Championship – Lancashire Second Eleven
- Most runs – Wally Hammond 3,252 @ 65.04 (HS 217)
- Most wickets – Tom Goddard 248 @ 16.76 (BB 10–113)
- New Zealand play a three-test series against England, losing the series one Test to nil with two draws.
- Wisden Cricketers of the Year – Tom Goddard, Joe Hardstaff, Jr., Leonard Hutton, Jim Parks, Sr., Eddie Paynter

Australia

- Sheffield Shield – Victoria
- Most runs – Don Bradman 1,552 @ 86.22 (HS 270)
- Most wickets
  - Chuck Fleetwood-Smith 53 @ 20.24 (BB 8–79)
  - Frank Ward 53 @ 28.41 (BB 7–127)

India

- Ranji Trophy – Nawanagar beat Bengal by 256 runs
- Bombay Pentangular – Muslims

New Zealand

- Plunket Shield – Auckland

South Africa

- Currie Cup – not contested

West Indies

- Inter-Colonial Tournament – Trinidad

== Cycling ==
Tour de France

- Roger Lapébie wins the Tour de France.

Giro d'Italia

- Gino Bartali of Legnano wins the 25th Giro d'Italia

== Field hockey ==
- July 14 – foundation of HC Den Bosch, a Dutch club based in 's-Hertogenbosch

== Figure skating ==
- World Figure Skating Championships –
  - Men's champion: Felix Kaspar, Austria
  - Ladies’ champion: Megan Taylor, Great Britain
  - Pair skating champion: Maxi Herber & Ernst Baier, Germany

== Golf ==
Men's professional

- Masters Tournament – Byron Nelson
- PGA Championship – Denny Shute
- U.S. Open – Ralph Guldahl
- British Open – Henry Cotton

Men's amateur

- British Amateur – Robert Sweeny Jr.
- U.S. Amateur – Johnny Goodman

Women's professional

- Women's Western Open – Helen Hicks
- Titleholders Championship – Patty Berg

== Horse racing ==
Steeplechases

- Cheltenham Gold Cup – not held due to flooding of Cheltenham Racecourse
- Grand National – Royal Mail

Hurdle races

- Champion Hurdle – Free Fare

Flat races

- Australia – Melbourne Cup won by The Trump
- Canada – King's Plate won by Goldlure
- France – Prix de l'Arc de Triomphe won by Corrida
- Ireland – Irish Derby Stakes won by Phideas
- English Triple Crown Races:
  1. 2,000 Guineas Stakes – Le Ksar
  2. The Derby – Mid-day Sun
  3. St. Leger Stakes – Chulmleigh
- United States Triple Crown Races:
  1. Kentucky Derby – War Admiral
  2. Preakness Stakes – War Admiral
  3. Belmont Stakes – War Admiral

== Ice hockey ==
- April 15 – The Detroit Red Wings defeat the New York Rangers 3–0 to win the 1937 Stanley Cup Finals
- April 17 – The Winnipeg Monarchs defeat the Copper Cliff Redmen 7–0 to win the 1937 Memorial Cup

== Nordic skiing ==
FIS Nordic World Ski Championships

- 10th FIS Nordic World Ski Championships 1937 are held at Chamonix, France

== Rowing ==
The Boat Race

- 24 March — Oxford wins the 89th Oxford and Cambridge Boat Race

== Rugby league ==
- 1936–37 European Rugby League Championship
- 1937 New Zealand rugby league season
- 1937 NSWRFL season
- 1936–37 Northern Rugby Football League season / 1937–38 Northern Rugby Football League season
- 1937–38 Kangaroo tour

== Rugby union ==
- 50th Home Nations Championship series is won by England

== Snooker ==
- World Snooker Championship – Joe Davis beats Horace Lindrum 32–29

== Speed skating ==
Speed Skating World Championships

- Men's All-round Champion – Michael Staksrud (Norway)
- Women's All-round Champion – Laila Schou Nilsen (Norway)

== Tennis ==
Australia

- Australian Men's Singles Championship – Vivian McGrath (Australia) defeats John Bromwich (Australia) 6–3, 1–6, 6–0, 2–6, 6–1
- Australian Women's Singles Championship – Nancye Wynne Bolton (Australia) defeats Emily Hood Westacott (Australia) 6–3, 5–7, 6–4

England

- Wimbledon Men's Singles Championship – Don Budge (USA) defeats Gottfried von Cramm (Germany) 6–3, 6–4, 6–2
- Wimbledon Women's Singles Championship – Dorothy Round Little (Great Britain) defeats Jadwiga Jędrzejowska (Poland) 6–2, 2–6, 7–5

France

- French Men's Singles Championship – Henner Henkel (Germany) defeats Bunny Austin (Great Britain) 6–1, 6–4, 6–3
- French Women's Singles Championship – Hilde Krahwinkel Sperling (Germany) defeats Simonne Mathieu (France) 6–2, 6–4

USA

- American Men's Singles Championship – Don Budge (USA) defeats Gottfried von Cramm (Germany) 6–1, 7–9, 6–1, 3–6, 6–1
- American Women's Singles Championship – Anita Lizana (Chile) defeats Jadwiga Jędrzejowska (Poland) 6–4, 6–2

Davis Cup

- 1937 International Lawn Tennis Challenge – United States 4–1 Great Britain at Centre Court, Wimbledon (grass) London, United Kingdom

== Yacht racing ==
- The New York Yacht Club retains the America's Cup as Ranger defeats British challenger Endeavour II, of the Royal Yacht Squadron, 4 races to 0

== Awards ==
- Associated Press Male Athlete of the Year – Don Budge, Tennis
- Associated Press Female Athlete of the Year – Katherine Rawls, Swimming
