= 1940 Australian Championships – Men's doubles =

Men's doubles
- 1940 Australian Championships

Final
- Champions: (Australia) John Bromwich (Australia) Adrian Quist
- Runners-up: (Australia) Jack Crawford (Australia) Vivian McGrath
- Score: 6–3, 7–5, 6–1

Details
- Draw: 16
- Seeds: 4

Events
Singles	men	women		boys	girls
Doubles	men	women	mixed	boys	girls
← 1939 ·	Australian Championships	· 1946 →

John Bromwich and Adrian Quist, the two-time defending champions in this event, successfully defended their title by defeating Jack Crawford and Vivian McGrath 6–3, 7–5, 6–1, to win the men's doubles tennis title at the 1940 Australian Championships.

Partaking in the Doubles was the only opportunity for Len Schwartz and Lionel Brodie, the seventh and eighth players in national ranking, to play in this year's Championships, as their late entries for the Singles were not accepted by the Council of the Lawn Tennis Association of Australia.

== Seeds ==
1. (Australia) John Bromwich / (Australia) Adrian Quist (champions)
2. (Australia) Jack Crawford / (Australia) Vivian McGrath (final)
3. (Australia) Harry Hopman / (Australia) Len Schwartz (semifinals)
4. (Australia) Colin Long / (Australia) Don Turnbull (semifinals)

== Draw ==
=== Key ===
- Q = Qualifier
- WC = Wild card
- LL = Lucky loser
- Alt = Alternate
- ITF = ITF entry
- PR = Protected ranking
- SR = Special ranking
- SE = Special exempt
- JE = Junior exempt
- JR = Junior Accelerator Programme entrant
- CO = College Accelerator Programme entrant
- NG = Next Gen Accelerator Program entrant
- w/o = Walkover
- r = Retired
- d = Defaulted

First round
1	(Australia) John Bromwich (Australia) Adrian Quist	6	6	6
(Australia) Jack Cummings (Australia) Evan Henry	4	0	3
(Australia) Frank Bennett (Australia) Arthur Huxley	6	8	6
(Australia) George Holland (Australia) Roy Harrison	1	6	4
4	(Australia) Colin Long (Australia) Don Turnbull	6	7	6
(Australia) Bert Felan (Australia) Harold Whillans	4	5	4
(Australia) Jack Harper (Australia) Dinny Pails	6	6	6
(Australia) George Kendall (Australia) Henry Lindo	1	4	4
3	(Australia) Harry Hopman (Australia) Len Schwartz	3	6	6	6
(Australia) Les Hancock (Australia) Arthur Liddle	6	4	2	1
(Australia) Jim Gilchrist (Australia) Bill Sidwell	6	6	6
(Australia) Max Bonner (Australia) Max McDermott	4	2	1
2	(Australia) Jack Crawford (Australia) Vivian McGrath	6	6	8
(Australia) Aub Brogan (Australia) Roger Woodland	1	0	6
(Australia) Dave Thompson (Australia) Neil Turvey	6	6	6
(Australia) Lionel Brodie (Australia) Max Newcombe	2	3	4

Quarterfinals
1	(Australia) John Bromwich (Australia) Adrian Quist	6	6	7
(Australia) Frank Bennett (Australia) Arthur Huxley	1	2	5
4	(Australia) Colin Long (Australia) Don Turnbull	4	6	3	6	6
(Australia) Jack Harper (Australia) Dinny Pails	6	2	6	3	2
3	(Australia) Harry Hopman (Australia) Len Schwartz	4	6	6	6
(Australia) Jim Gilchrist (Australia) Bill Sidwell	6	3	4	4
2	(Australia) Jack Crawford (Australia) Vivian McGrath	7	6	6
(Australia) Dave Thompson (Australia) Neil Turvey	5	3	2

Semifinals
1	(Australia) John Bromwich (Australia) Adrian Quist	6	6	6
4	(Australia) Colin Long (Australia) Don Turnbull	4	3	3
3	(Australia) Harry Hopman (Australia) Len Schwartz	4	4	6
2	(Australia) Jack Crawford (Australia) Vivian McGrath	6	6	8

Final
1	(Australia) John Bromwich (Australia) Adrian Quist	6	7	6
2	(Australia) Jack Crawford (Australia) Vivian McGrath	3	5	1
