= 1937 Australian Championships – Men's doubles =

Men's doubles
- 1937 Australian Championships

Final
- Champions: (Australia) Adrian Quist (Australia) Don Turnbull
- Runners-up: (Australia) John Bromwich (Australia) Jack Harper
- Score: 6–2, 9–7, 1–6, 6–8, 6–4

Details
- Draw: 12
- Seeds: 4

Events
| Singles | men | women | | boys | girls |
| Doubles | men | women | mixed | boys | girls |
| ← 1936 · | Australian Championships | · 1938 → |

Defending champions Adrian Quist and Don Turnbull defeated John Bromwich and Jack Harper 6–2, 9–7, 1–6, 6–8, 6–4, to win the men's doubles tennis title at the 1937 Australian Championships.

== Seeds ==
1. (Australia) Adrian Quist / (Australia) Don Turnbull (champions)
2. (Australia) Jack Crawford / (Australia) Vivian McGrath (semifinals)
3. (Australia) Arthur Huxley / (Australia) Len Schwartz (quarterfinals)
4. (Australia) Harry Hopman / (Australia) Abel Kay (quarterfinals)

== Draw ==
=== Key ===
- Q = Qualifier
- WC = Wild card
- LL = Lucky loser
- Alt = Alternate
- ITF = ITF entry
- PR = Protected ranking
- SR = Special ranking
- SE = Special exempt
- JE = Junior exempt
- JR = Junior Accelerator Programme entrant
- CO = College Accelerator Programme entrant
- NG = Next Gen Accelerator Program entrant
- w/o = Walkover
- r = Retired
- d = Defaulted

=== Draw ===
First round
(Australia) Dave Thompson (Australia) Neil Turvey | 6 | 6 | 6
(Australia) Norm Brimson (Australia) Evan Henry | 4 | 4 | 2
3 | (Australia) Arthur Huxley (Australia) Len Schwartz | 6 | 6 | 6
(Australia) Vince Kelly (Australia) Howard Lewis | 2 | 1 | 3
4 | (Australia) Harry Hopman (Australia) Abel Kay | 6 | 6 | 3 | 6
(Australia) Fred Bennett (Australia) Bill Sidwell | 4 | 3 | 6 | 4
(Australia) John Bromwich (Australia) Jack Harper | 6 | 6 | 6
(Australia) Max Bonner (Australia) William F. Stephen | 4 | 2 | 2

Quarterfinals
1 | (Australia) Adrian Quist (Australia) Don Turnbull | 6 | 6 | 6
(Australia) Jim Gilchrist (Australia) Henry Lindo | 3 | 4 | 4
(Australia) Dave Thompson (Australia) Neil Turvey | 6 | 1 | 6 | 7
3 | (Australia) Arthur Huxley (Australia) Len Schwartz | 4 | 6 | 4 | 5
4 | (Australia) Harry Hopman (Australia) Abel Kay | 3 | 2 | 6 | 7 | 2
(Australia) John Bromwich (Australia) Jack Harper | 6 | 6 | 4 | 5 | 6
2 | (Australia) Jack Crawford (Australia) Vivian McGrath | 6 | 7 | 6
(Australia) Les Hancock (Australia) Gar Moon | 3 | 5 | 4

Semifinals
1 | (Australia) Adrian Quist (Australia) Don Turnbull | 6 | 10 | 6
(Australia) Dave Thompson (Australia) Neil Turvey | 3 | 8 | 2
(Australia) John Bromwich (Australia) Jack Harper | 6 | 6 | 4 | 6
2 | (Australia) Jack Crawford (Australia) Vivian McGrath | 3 | 3 | 6 | 4

Final
1 | (Australia) Adrian Quist (Australia) Don Turnbull | 6 | 9 | 1 | 6 | 6
(Australia) John Bromwich (Australia) Jack Harper | 2 | 7 | 6 | 8 | 4
