= 1936 Australian Championships – Men's doubles =

Men's doubles
- 1936 Australian Championships

Final
- Champions: (Australia) Adrian Quist (Australia) Don Turnbull
- Runners-up: (Australia) Jack Crawford (Australia) Vivian McGrath
- Score: 6–8, 6–2, 6–1, 3–6, 6–2

Details
- Draw: 15 (Note: Initial draw gives 16 pairs.)
- Seeds: 4

Events
| Singles | men | women | | boys | girls |
| Doubles | men | women | mixed | boys | girls |
| ← 1935 · | Australian Championships | · 1937 → |

Adrian Quist and Don Turnbull defeated the defending champions Jack Crawford, and Vivian McGrath 6–8, 6–2, 6–1, 3–6, 6–2, to win the men's doubles tennis title at the 1936 Australian Championships.

== Seeds ==
1. (Australia) Jack Crawford / (Australia) Vivian McGrath (final)
2. (Australia) Adrian Quist / (Australia) Don Turnbull (champions)
3. (Australia) Harry Hopman / (Australia) Len Schwartz (semifinals)
4. (Australia) John Bromwich / (Australia) Arthur Huxley (quarterfinals)

== Draw ==
=== Key ===
- Q = Qualifier
- WC = Wild card
- LL = Lucky loser
- Alt = Alternate
- ITF = ITF entry
- PR = Protected ranking
- SR = Special ranking
- SE = Special exempt
- JE = Junior exempt
- JR = Junior Accelerator Programme entrant
- CO = College Accelerator Programme entrant
- NG = Next Gen Accelerator Program entrant
- w/o = Walkover
- r = Retired
- d = Defaulted

=== Draw ===
First round
1 | (Australia) Jack Crawford (Australia) Vivian McGrath | 6 | 6 | 6
(Australia) Alfred Chave (Australia) John Grinstead | 2 | 4 | 3
(Australia) Les Hancock (Australia) Gar Moon | 6 | 6 | 6
(Australia) Stan Gifford (Australia) Roy Harrison | 2 | 2 | 2
(Australia) William F. Stephen (Australia) Norman Wasley | 11 | 5
(Australia) Jim Black (Note: Initial pairing was Ron Hone with Neil Ennis.) (Australia) Ron Hone | 9 | 7 | r (Note: Some sources give other result: 11–9, 7–5, forfeit.)
3 | (Australia) Harry Hopman (Australia) Len Schwartz | 6 | 6 | 6
(Australia) Ted Anstee (Australia) Ken Marschner | 1 | 1 | 1
4 | (Australia) John Bromwich (Australia) Arthur Huxley | 6 | 8 | 6
(Australia) Cliff Harvey (Australia) Rupert Shepherd | 4 | 6 | 3
(Australia) Gar Hone (Australia) Abel Kay | 6 | 7 | 6
(Australia) Frank Walsh (Australia) Tom Warhurst | 1 | 5 | 4
(Australia) Jim Gilchrist (Australia) Henry Lindo | 5 | 6 | 6 | 6 | 7
(Australia) Lionel Brodie (Australia) Ian Carson | 7 | 3 | 8 | 3 | 5
2 | (Australia) Adrian Quist (Australia) Don Turnbull
(Australia) Les Hamilton (Australia) G. A. McPherson | (Note: This is pairing according to initial draw. Apparently this match was never played – probable withdrawal.)

Quarterfinals
1 | (Australia) Jack Crawford (Australia) Vivian McGrath | 6 | 6 | 6
(Australia) Les Hancock (Australia) Gar Moon | 4 | 2 | 3
(Australia) William F. Stephen (Australia) Norman Wasley | 1 | 4 | 7 | 5
3 | (Australia) Harry Hopman (Australia) Len Schwartz | 6 | 6 | 5 | 7
4 | (Australia) John Bromwich (Australia) Arthur Huxley | 4 | 3 | 2
(Australia) Gar Hone (Australia) Abel Kay | 6 | 6 | 6
(Australia) Jim Gilchrist (Australia) Henry Lindo | 4 | 2 | 5
2 | (Australia) Adrian Quist (Australia) Don Turnbull | 6 | 6 | 7

Semifinals
1 | (Australia) Jack Crawford (Australia) Vivian McGrath | 6 | 7 | 5 | 6
3 | (Australia) Harry Hopman (Australia) Len Schwartz | 4 | 5 | 7 | 2
(Australia) Gar Hone (Australia) Abel Kay | 4 | 4 | 4
2 | (Australia) Adrian Quist (Australia) Don Turnbull | 6 | 6 | 6

Final
1 | (Australia) Jack Crawford (Australia) Vivian McGrath | 8 | 2 | 1 | 6 | 2
2 | (Australia) Adrian Quist (Australia) Don Turnbull | 6 | 6 | 6 | 3 | 6
