= 1936 Australian Championships – Mixed doubles =

Mixed doubles
- 1936 Australian Championships

Final
- Champions: (Australia) Nell Hopman (Australia) Harry Hopman
- Runners-up: (Australia) May Blick (Australia) Abel Kay
- Score: 6–2, 6–0

Details
- Draw: 14
- Seeds: 4

Events
Singles	men	women		boys	girls
Doubles	men	women	mixed	boys	girls
- Australian Championships

Six years after the first one, and now as a married couple, Nell Hopman and Harry Hopman claimed their second domestic title by defeating May Blick and Abel Kay 6–2, 6–0, to win the mixed doubles tennis title at the 1936 Australian Championships.

== Seeds ==
1. (Australia) Nell Hopman / (Australia) Harry Hopman (champions)
2. (Australia) Joan Hartigan / (Australia) Gar Moon (semifinals)
3. (Australia) Joan Walters / (Australia) Don Turnbull (first round)
4. (Australia) Gwen Griffiths / (Australia) Len Schwartz (semifinals)

== Draw ==
Key

- Q = Qualifier
- WC = Wild card
- LL = Lucky loser
- Alt = Alternate
- ITF = ITF entry
- PR = Protected ranking
- SR = Special ranking
- SE = Special exempt
- JE = Junior exempt
- JR = Junior Accelerator Programme entrant
- CO = College Accelerator Programme entrant
- NG = Next Gen Accelerator Program entrant
- w/o = Walkover
- r = Retired
- d = Defaulted

=== Draw ===
First round
(Australia) Gwen Stevenson (Australia) Cliff Harvey	7	6
(Australia) Truda Cox (Australia) Alfred Chave (Note: In the initial draw Cox was paired with George McPherson.)	5	3
(Australia) Nancye Wynne (Australia) Les Hancock	6	8	6
(Australia) Dorothy Weston (Australia) Stan Gifford	3	10	4
4	(Australia) Gwen Griffiths (Australia) Len Schwartz (Note: Originally Griffiths/Schwartz got a bye and Hardcastle/Grinstead were drawn against Woodward/Stephen.)	6	7
(Australia) May Hardcastle (Australia) John Grinstead	1	5
(Australia) May Blick (Australia) Abel Kay (Note: There was no Blick/Kay pair in the original draw and Walters/Turnbull were drawn against Jean Wilson and partner.)	6	6
3	(Australia) Joan Walters (Australia) Don Turnbull	2	1
(Australia) Birdie Bond (Australia) Gar Hone	2	6	8
(Australia) Dot Stevenson (Australia) Ron Hone	6	4	6
2	(Australia) Joan Hartigan (Australia) Gar Moon	6	6
(Australia) Kathleen Le Messurier (Australia) Rupert Shepherd	4	3

Quarterfinals
1	(Australia) Nell Hopman (Australia) Harry Hopman	6	6
(Australia) Gwen Stevenson (Australia) Cliff Harvey	3	4
(Australia) Nancye Wynne (Australia) Les Hancock	9	6
4	(Australia) Gwen Griffiths (Australia) Len Schwartz	11	8
(Australia) Kath Woodward (Australia) William F. Stephen	2	2
(Australia) May Blick (Australia) Abel Kay	6	6
(Australia) Birdie Bond (Australia) Gar Hone	2	1
2	(Australia) Joan Hartigan (Australia) Gar Moon	6	6

Semifinals
1	(Australia) Nell Hopman (Australia) Harry Hopman	4	6	6
4	(Australia) Gwen Griffiths (Australia) Len Schwartz	6	0	2
(Australia) May Blick (Australia) Abel Kay	7	6
2	(Australia) Joan Hartigan (Australia) Gar Moon	5	2

Final
1	(Australia) Nell Hopman (Australia) Harry Hopman	6	6
(Australia) May Blick (Australia) Abel Kay	2	0
