= 1940 Australian Championships – Mixed doubles =

Mixed doubles
- 1940 Australian Championships

Final
- Champions: (Australia) Nancye Wynne (Australia) Colin Long
- Runners-up: (Australia) Nell Hopman (Australia) Harry Hopman
- Score: 7–5, 2–6, 6–4

Details
- Draw: 14 (Note: Originally 11 pairs were drawn.)
- Seeds: 4

Events
Singles	men	women		boys	girls
Doubles	men	women	mixed	boys	girls
- Australian Championships

The fourth seeds Nancye Wynne and Colin Long started their streak of four consecutive Australian Mixed Doubles titles by defeating the defending champions Nell Hopman and Harry Hopman 7–5, 2–6, 6–4, to win the mixed doubles tennis title at the 1940 Australian Championships.

== Seeds ==
1. (Australia) Nell Hopman / (Australia) Harry Hopman (final)
2. (Australia) Joan Hartigan / (Australia) Vivian McGrath (semifinals)
3. (Australia) May Hardcastle / (Australia) John Bromwich (semifinals)
4. (Australia) Nancye Wynne / (Australia) Colin Long (champions)

== Draw ==
Key

- Q = Qualifier
- WC = Wild card
- LL = Lucky loser
- Alt = Alternate
- ITF = ITF entry
- PR = Protected ranking
- SR = Special ranking
- SE = Special exempt
- JE = Junior exempt
- JR = Junior Accelerator Programme entrant
- CO = College Accelerator Programme entrant
- NG = Next Gen Accelerator Program entrant
- w/o = Walkover
- r = Retired
- d = Defaulted

=== Draw ===
First round
2	(Australia) Joan Hartigan (Note: In the original draw this pair received a first round bye.) (Australia) Vivian McGrath	6	6
(Australia) Alison Hattersley (Note: This pair was not present in the original draw.) (Australia) Les Hancock	4	4
(Australia) Olive Stebbing (Australia) Jim Gilchrist	6	6
(Australia) Rosemary Rees (Australia) Max Newcombe	4	2
4	(Australia) Nancye Wynne (Australia) Colin Long	6	6
(Australia) Gwen O'Halloran (Australia) Fred Bennett	1	3
(Australia) Edie Niemeyer (Australia) Bill Sidwell	6	6
(Australia) Kath Woodward (Australia) Max Bonner	3	4
(Australia) Mary Chapman (Australia) Don Turnbull	6	6
(Australia) Connie Coate (Australia) Harold Whillans	2	3
1	(Australia) Nell Hopman (Australia) Harry Hopman	6	6
(Australia) Clare Proctor (Australia) Jack Cummings	2	4

Quarterfinals
2	(Australia) Joan Hartigan (Australia) Vivian McGrath	6	6
(Australia) Olive Stebbing (Australia) Jim Gilchrist	3	2
4	(Australia) Nancye Wynne (Australia) Colin Long	6	6
(Australia) Edie Niemeyer (Australia) Bill Sidwell	3	3
(Australia) Audrey Lewin (Note: Thelma Rice and Arthur Huxley made a pair in the original draw (they received a first round bye) but they apparently withdrew.) (Australia) Bert Felan	2	6	1
3	(Australia) May Hardcastle (Australia) John Bromwich	6	4	6
(Australia) Mary Chapman (Australia) Don Turnbull	4	2
1	(Australia) Nell Hopman (Australia) Harry Hopman	6	6

Semifinals
2	(Australia) Joan Hartigan (Australia) Vivian McGrath	6	4	3
4	(Australia) Nancye Wynne (Australia) Colin Long	4	6	6
3	(Australia) May Hardcastle (Australia) John Bromwich	7	7	2
1	(Australia) Nell Hopman (Australia) Harry Hopman	9	5	6

Final
4	(Australia) Nancye Wynne (Australia) Colin Long	7	2	6
1	(Australia) Nell Hopman (Australia) Harry Hopman	5	6	4
