= 1940 Australian Championships – Men's singles =

Men's singles
- 1940 Australian Championships

Final
- Champion: (Australia) Adrian Quist
- Runner-up: (Australia) Jack Crawford
- Score: 6–3, 6–1, 6–2

Details
- Draw: 32
- Seeds: 8

Events
Singles	men	women		boys	girls
Doubles	men	women	mixed	boys	girls
- Australian Championships

Adrian Quist defeated Jack Crawford 6–3, 6–1, 6–2 in the final to win the men's singles tennis title at the 1940 Australian Championships.

== Seeds ==
The seeded players are listed below. Adrian Quist is the champion; others show the round in which they were eliminated.

1. (Australia) John Bromwich (semifinals)
2. (Australia) Adrian Quist (champion)
3. (Australia) Harry Hopman (quarterfinals)
4. (Australia) Jack Crawford (finalist)
5. (Australia) Vivian McGrath (semifinals)
6. (Australia) Max Newcombe (quarterfinals)
7. (Australia) Bill Sidwell (quarterfinals)
8. (Australia) Jack Harper (second round)

== Draw ==
=== Key ===
- Q = Qualifier
- WC = Wild card
- LL = Lucky loser
- r = Retired

=== Finals ===
Quarterfinals
1	(Australia) John Bromwich	7	6	6
(Australia) Dinny Pails	5	0	0
4	(Australia) Jack Crawford	6	6	7
6	(Australia) Max Newcombe	3	0	5
2	(Australia) Adrian Quist	6	11	6	6
7	(Australia) Bill Sidwell	3	13	3	2
3	(Australia) Harry Hopman	8	1	5	2
5	(Australia) Vivian McGrath	6	6	7	6

Semifinals
1	(Australia) John Bromwich	4	1	7
4	(Australia) Jack Crawford	6	6	9
2	(Australia) Adrian Quist	6	10	6
5	(Australia) Vivian McGrath	4	8	3

Final
4	(Australia) Jack Crawford	3	1	2
2	(Australia) Adrian Quist	6	6	6

=== Earlier rounds ===
==== Section 1 ====
First round
1	(Australia) Bromwich	6	6	6
(Australia) Compain	0	2	1
(Australia) Hancock	w/o
(Australia) Thompson
8	(Australia) Harper	6	7	6	8
(Australia) Huxley	0	9	3	6
(Australia) Pails	6	6	6
(Australia) Diggle	1	1	2
4	(Australia) Crawford	6	6	6
(Australia) Strohfeldt	0	2	4
(Australia) Long	6	6	6
(Australia) Murray	1	1	0
6	(Australia) Newcombe	6	6	6
(Australia) Yon	1	3	2
(Australia) Lindo	6	9	7
(Australia) McDermott	1	7	5

Second round
1	(Australia) Bromwich	6	6	6
(Australia) Hancock	3	0	1
8	(Australia) Harper	2	3	5
(Australia) Pails	6	6	7
4	(Australia) Crawford	6	6	6
(Australia) Long	3	4	3
6	(Australia) Newcombe	6	6	6
(Australia) Lindo	4	3	2

Quarterfinals
1	(Australia) Bromwich	7	6	6
(Australia) Pails	5	0	0
4	(Australia) Crawford	6	6	7
6	(Australia) Newcombe	3	0	5

Semifinals
1	(Australia) Bromwich	4	1	7
4	(Australia) Crawford	6	6	9

==== Section 2 ====
First round
2	(Australia) Quist	6	6	6
(Australia) Barnes	2	3	2
(Australia) Gilchrist	2	6	6	9
(Australia) Cummings	6	3	4	7
7	(Australia) Sidwell	6	6	6
(Australia) Harrison	2	3	1
(Australia) Bonner	6	6	6
(Australia) Whillans	4	3	2
3	(Australia) Hopman	6	7	6
(Australia) Felan	4	5	4
(Australia) Bennett	6	6	4	6
(Australia) Liddle	1	2	6	1
5	(Australia) McGrath	6	6	6
(Australia) Lean	1	1	4
(Australia) Turnbull	6	3	6	6
(Australia) Callaghan	1	6	2	2

Second round
2	(Australia) Quist	6	6	6
(Australia) Gilchrist	3	3	3
7	(Australia) Sidwell	10	6	6
(Australia) Bonner	8	2	4
3	(Australia) Hopman	6	6	6
(Australia) Bennett	1	0	2
5	(Australia) McGrath	6	6	6
(Australia) Turnbull	2	1	1

Quarterfinals
2	(Australia) Quist	6	11	6	6
7	(Australia) Sidwell	3	13	3	2
3	(Australia) Hopman	8	1	5	2
5	(Australia) McGrath	6	6	7	6

Semifinals
2	(Australia) Quist	6	10	6
5	(Australia) McGrath	4	8	3

Preceded by 1939 U.S. National Championships	Grand Slam men's singles	Succeeded by 1940 U.S. National Championships
