= 1936 Australian Championships =

- Date: 20–27 January 1936
- Edition: 29th
- Category: Grand Slam (ITF)
- Surface: Grass
- Location: Adelaide, Australia
- Venue: Memorial Drive

Champions

Men's singles
- (Australia) Adrian Quist

Women's singles
- (Australia) Joan Hartigan

Men's doubles
- (Australia) Adrian Quist / (Australia) Don Turnbull

Women's doubles
- (Australia) Thelma Coyne / (Australia) Nancye Wynne

Mixed doubles
- (Australia) Nell Hall Hopman / (Australia) Harry Hopman

Boys' singles
- (Australia) John Bromwich

Girls' singles
- (Australia) Thelma Coyne

Boys' doubles
- (Australia) Jim Gilchrist / (Australia) Henry Lindo

Girls' doubles
- (Australia) Molly Carter / (Australia) Margaret Wilson
- Australian Championships

The 1936 Australian Championships was a tennis tournament that took place on outdoor Grass courts at the Memorial Drive, Adelaide, Australia from 18 to 27 January (No matches were scheduled on Tuesday 21 January after the death of King George V). It was the 29th edition of the Australian Championships (now known as the Australian Open), the 6th held in Adelaide, and the first Grand Slam tournament of the year. The singles titles were won by Australians Adrian Quist and Joan Hartigan.

== Finals ==
=== Men's singles ===
(Australia) Adrian Quist defeated (Australia) Jack Crawford 6–2, 6–3, 4–6, 3–6, 9–7

=== Women's singles ===
(Australia) Joan Hartigan defeated (Australia) Nancye Wynne 6–4, 6–4

=== Men's doubles ===
(Australia) Adrian Quist / (Australia) Don Turnbull defeated (Australia) Jack Crawford / (Australia) Vivian McGrath 6–8, 6–2, 6–1, 3–6, 6–2

=== Women's doubles ===
(Australia) Thelma Coyne / (Australia) Nancye Wynne defeated (Australia) May Blick / (Australia) Kath Woodward 6–2, 6–4

=== Mixed doubles ===
(Australia) Nell Hall Hopman / (Australia) Harry Hopman defeated (Australia) May Blick / (Australia) Abel Kay 6–2, 6–0

Preceded by 1935 U.S. National Championships	Grand Slams	Succeeded by 1936 French Championships
