= 1937 Australian Championships – Mixed doubles =

Mixed doubles
- 1937 Australian Championships

Final
- Champions: (Australia) Nell Hopman (Australia) Harry Hopman
- Runners-up: (Australia) Dot Stevenson (Australia) Don Turnbull
- Score: 3–6, 6–3, 6–2

Details
- Draw: 14
- Seeds: 4

Events
Singles	men	women		boys	girls
Doubles	men	women	mixed	boys	girls
- Australian Championships

Nell Hopman and Harry Hopman successfully defended their title by defeating Dot Stevenson and Don Turnbull 3–6, 6–3, 6–2, to win the mixed doubles tennis title at the 1937 Australian Championships.

== Seeds ==
1. (Australia) Nell Hopman / (Australia) Harry Hopman (champions)
2. (Australia) Dot Stevenson / (Australia) Don Turnbull (final)
3. (Australia) Nancye Wynne / (Australia) Gar Moon (semifinals)
4. (Australia) Joan Hartigan / (Australia) Arthur Huxley (quarterfinals)

== Draw ==
Key

- Q = Qualifier
- WC = Wild card
- LL = Lucky loser
- Alt = Alternate
- ITF = ITF entry
- PR = Protected ranking
- SR = Special ranking
- SE = Special exempt
- JE = Junior exempt
- JR = Junior Accelerator Programme entrant
- CO = College Accelerator Programme entrant
- NG = Next Gen Accelerator Program entrant
- w/o = Walkover
- r = Retired
- d = Defaulted

=== Draw ===
First round
(Australia) Gwen O'Halloran (Australia) Len Schwartz	6	1	7
(Australia) Vera Selwin (Australia) Fred Bennett	3	6	5
(Australia) May Blick (Australia) Neil Turvey	6	6
(Australia) Connie Coate (Australia) Norm Brimson	1	4
3	(Australia) Nancye Wynne (Australia) Gar Moon	2	6	6
(Australia) Peg Menzies (Australia) Max Bonner	6	2	3
4	(Australia) Joan Hartigan (Australia) Arthur Huxley	8	6
(Australia) May Hardcastle (Australia) Vince Kelly	6	4
(Australia) Thelma Rice (Australia) Howard Lewis	6	8
(Australia) Alison Hattersley (Australia) Les Hancock	4	6
(Australia) Emily Hood Westacott (Australia) Jim Gilchrist	6	6
(Australia) Kath Woodward (Australia) William F. Stephen	3	2

Quarterfinals
1	(Australia) Nell Hopman (Australia) Harry Hopman	6	6
(Australia) Gwen O'Halloran (Australia) Len Schwartz	2	4
(Australia) May Blick (Australia) Neil Turvey	1	2
3	(Australia) Nancye Wynne (Australia) Gar Moon	6	6
4	(Australia) Joan Hartigan (Australia) Arthur Huxley	6	4	4
(Australia) Thelma Rice (Australia) Howard Lewis	3	6	6
(Australia) Emily Hood Westacott (Australia) Jim Gilchrist	6	0	1
2	(Australia) Dot Stevenson (Australia) Don Turnbull	2	6	6

Semifinals
1	(Australia) Nell Hopman (Australia) Harry Hopman	3	6	6
3	(Australia) Nancye Wynne (Australia) Gar Moon	6	3	4
(Australia) Thelma Rice (Australia) Howard Lewis	3	3
2	(Australia) Dot Stevenson (Australia) Don Turnbull	6	6

Final
1	(Australia) Nell Hopman (Australia) Harry Hopman	3	6	6
2	(Australia) Dot Stevenson (Australia) Don Turnbull	6	3	2
