= 1937 Australian Championships =

- Date: 22–30 January 1937
- Edition: 30th
- Category: Grand Slam (ITF)
- Surface: Grass
- Location: Sydney, Australia
- Venue: White City Tennis Club

Champions

Men's singles
- (Australia) Vivian McGrath

Women's singles
- (Australia) Nancye Wynne

Men's doubles
- (Australia) Adrian Quist / (Australia) Don Turnbull

Women's doubles
- (Australia) Thelma Coyne / (Australia) Nancye Wynne

Mixed doubles
- (Australia) Nell Hall Hopman / (Australia) Harry Hopman

Boys' singles
- (Australia) John Bromwich

Girls' singles
- (Australia) Margaret Wilson

Boys' doubles
- (Australia) John Bromwich / (Australia) Dinny Pails

Girls' doubles
- (Australia) Joan Prior / (Australia) Ida Webb
- Australian Championships

The 1937 Australian Championships was a tennis tournament that took place on outdoor Grass courts at the White City Tennis Club, Sydney, Australia from 22 January to 1 February. It was the 30th edition of the Australian Championships (now known as the Australian Open), the 8th held in Sydney, and the first Grand Slam tournament of the year. The singles titles were won by Australians Vivian McGrath and Nancye Wynne.

== Finals ==
=== Men's singles ===
(Australia) Vivian McGrath defeated (Australia) John Bromwich 6–3, 1–6, 6–0, 2–6, 6–1

=== Women's singles ===
(Australia) Nancye Wynne defeated (Australia) Emily Hood Westacott 6–3, 5–7, 6–4

=== Men's doubles ===
(Australia) Adrian Quist / (Australia) Don Turnbull defeated (Australia) John Bromwich / (Australia) Jack Harper 6–2, 9–7, 1–6, 6–8, 6–4

=== Women's doubles ===
(Australia) Thelma Coyne / (Australia) Nancye Wynne defeated (Australia) Nell Hall Hopman / (Australia) Emily Hood Westacott 6–2, 6–2

=== Mixed doubles ===
(Australia) Nell Hall Hopman / (Australia) Harry Hopman defeated (Australia) Dorothy Stevenson / (Australia) Don Turnbull 3–6, 6–3, 6–2

Preceded by 1936 U.S. National Championships	Grand Slams	Succeeded by 1937 French Championships
