= 1936 Australian Championships – Men's singles =

Men's singles
- 1936 Australian Championships

Final
- Champion: (Australia) Adrian Quist
- Runner-up: (Australia) Jack Crawford
- Score: 6–2, 6–3, 4–6, 3–6, 9–7

Details
- Draw: 32
- Seeds: 8

Events
Singles	men	women		boys	girls
Doubles	men	women	mixed	boys	girls
- Australian Championships

Adrian Quist defeated Jack Crawford 6–2, 6–3, 4–6, 3–6, 9–7 in the final to win the men's singles tennis title at the 1936 Australian Championships.

== Seeds ==
The seeded players are listed below. Adrian Quist is the champion; others show the round in which they were eliminated.

1. (Australia) Jack Crawford (finalist) / (Australia) Adrian Quist (champion)
2. n/a
3. (Australia) Vivian McGrath (quarterfinals)
4. (Australia) Don Turnbull (quarterfinals)
5. (Australia) John Bromwich (quarterfinals)
6. (Australia) Harry Hopman (semifinals)
7. (Australia) Abel Kay (semifinals)
8. (Australia) Len Schwartz (second round)

== Draw ==
=== Key ===
- Q = Qualifier
- WC = Wild card
- LL = Lucky loser
- r = Retired

Quarterfinals
1	(Australia) Adrian Quist	6	6	6
5	(Australia) John Bromwich	1	4	1
3	(Australia) Vivian McGrath	3	6	3	5
6	(Australia) Harry Hopman	6	0	6	7
7	(Australia) Abel Kay	6	6	3	7
4	(Australia) Don Turnbull	3	4	6	5
(Australia) Edgar Moon	2	3	7
1	(Australia) Jack Crawford	6	6	9

Semifinals
1	(Australia) Adrian Quist	4	6	10	6
6	(Australia) Harry Hopman	6	2	8	3
7	(Australia) Abel Kay	2	7	2
1	(Australia) Jack Crawford	6	9	6

Finals
1	(Australia) Adrian Quist	6	6	4	3	9
1	(Australia) Jack Crawford	2	3	6	6	7

=== Earlier rounds ===
==== Section 1 ====
First round
1	(Australia) Quist	6	6	8
(Australia) Hamilton	3	0	6
(Australia) Gilchrist	2	6	4	6	6
(Australia) Anstee	6	3	6	4	0
(Australia) Bonner	4	2	7
(Australia) Brodie	6	6	9
5	(Australia) Bromwich	6	6	6
(Australia) Shephard	1	1	0
3	(Australia) McGrath	6	6	6
(Australia) Mayfield	2	1	1
(Australia) Stephen	6	6	6
(Australia) Marschner	3	0	4
6	(Australia) Hopman	6	6	6
(Australia) Buttfield	2	4	0
(Australia) Harvey	6	6	7
(Australia) Wilkinson	2	1	5

Second round
1	(Australia) Quist	6	6	6
(Australia) Gilchrist	2	2	4
(Australia) Brodie	5	2	1
5	(Australia) Bromwich	7	6	6
3	(Australia) McGrath	6	6	7
(Australia) Stephen	4	3	5
6	(Australia) Hopman	7	6	6
(Australia) Harvey	5	2	3

Quarterfinals
1	(Australia) Quist	6	6	6
5	(Australia) Bromwich	1	4	1
3	(Australia) McGrath	3	6	3	5
6	(Australia) Hopman	6	0	6	7

Semifinals
1	(Australia) Quist	4	6	10	6
6	(Australia) Hopman	6	2	8	3

==== Section 2 ====
First round
7	(Australia) Kay	6	6	6
(Australia) Walsh	3	1	1
(Australia) Huxley	6	6	6
(Australia) Weston	2	3	4
4	(Australia) Turnbull	6	6	6
(Australia) Gifford	2	2	4
(Australia) Hancock	6	6	6
(Australia) Lindo	3	1	1
(Australia) Moon	6	6	6
(Australia) B. Kay	0	3	0
8	(Australia) Schwartz	6	6	6
(Australia) Lawton	3	4	3
1	(Australia) Crawford	6	6	6
(Australia) Mann	4	0	1
(Australia) Grinstead	6	3	9	6
(Australia) Carson	2	6	7	4

Second round
7	(Australia) Kay	7	6	6
(Australia) Huxley	5	3	1
4	(Australia) Turnbull	6	6	6
(Australia) Hancock	2	3	1
(Australia) Moon	3	6	6	5	6
8	(Australia) Schwartz	6	2	3	7	3
1	(Australia) Crawford	6	6	3	6
(Australia) Grinstead	1	4	6	3

Quarterfinals
7	(Australia) Kay	6	6	3	7
4	(Australia) Turnbull	3	4	6	5
(Australia) Moon	2	3	7
1	(Australia) Crawford	6	6	9

Semifinals
7	(Australia) Kay	2	7	2
1	(Australia) Crawford	6	9	6

Preceded by 1935 U.S. National Championships	Grand Slam men's singles	Succeeded by 1936 French Championships
