= 1937 Australian Championships – Men's singles =

Men's singles
- 1937 Australian Championships

Final
- Champion: (Australia) Vivian McGrath
- Runner-up: (Australia) John Bromwich
- Score: 6–3, 1–6, 6–0, 2–6, 6–1

Details
- Draw: 32
- Seeds: 8

Events
Singles	men	women		boys	girls
Doubles	men	women	mixed	boys	girls
- Australian Championships

Third-seeded Vivian McGrath defeated John Bromwich 6–3, 1–6, 6–0, 2–6, 6–1 in the final to win the men's singles tennis title at the 1937 Australian Championships.

== Seeds ==
The seeded players are listed below. Vivian McGrath is the champion; others show the round in which they were eliminated.

1. (Australia) Jack Crawford (semifinals)
2. (Australia) Adrian Quist (quarterfinals)
3. (Australia) Vivian McGrath (champion)
4. (Australia) John Bromwich (finalist)
5. (Australia) Don Turnbull (quarterfinals)
6. (Australia) Abel Kay (quarterfinals)
7. (Australia) Harry Hopman (semifinals)
8. (Australia) Len Schwartz (quarterfinals)

== Draw ==
=== Key ===
- Q = Qualifier
- WC = Wild card
- LL = Lucky loser
- r = Retired

=== Finals ===
Quarterfinals
1	(Australia) Jack Crawford	6	2	3	6	6
8	(Australia) Len Schwartz	3	6	6	2	3
4	(Australia) John Bromwich	6	6	6
5	(Australia) Don Turnbull	2	2	0
6	(Australia) Abel Kay	2	2	6
3	(Australia) Vivian McGrath	6	6	8
7	(Australia) Harry Hopman	11	3	7	6
2	(Australia) Adrian Quist	9	6	5	3

Semifinals
1	(Australia) Jack Crawford	1	9	4	6
4	(Australia) John Bromwich	6	7	6	8
3	(Australia) Vivian McGrath	6	6	7
7	(Australia) Harry Hopman	4	1	5

Final
4	(Australia) John Bromwich	3	6	0	6	1
3	(Australia) Vivian McGrath	6	1	6	2	6

=== Earlier rounds ===
==== Section 1 ====
First round
1	(Australia) Crawford	6	6	6
(Australia) B. Kay	1	4	3
(Australia) Sidwell	6	4	7	6	6
(Australia) Stephen	4	6	9	3	2
8	(Australia) Schwartz	6	6	8
(Australia) Betts	2	3	6
(Australia) Hancock	6	4	6	8
(Australia) Henry	1	6	1	6
4	(Australia) Bromwich	6	6	6
(Australia) Brimson	1	2	1
(Australia) Moon	6	6	4	6
(Australia) Felan	2	3	6	1
5	(Australia) Turnbull	6	6	6
(Australia) Long	3	2	3
(Australia) Bennett	6	6	6
(Australia) Bonner	3	3	4

Second round
1	(Australia) Crawford	6	6	6
(Australia) Sidwell	2	2	1
8	(Australia) Schwartz	4	6	6	6
(Australia) Hancock	6	4	3	4
4	(Australia) Bromwich	6	6	6
(Australia) Moon	1	4	3
5	(Australia) Turnbull	6	7	6
(Australia) Bennett	3	5	2

Quarterfinals
1	(Australia) Crawford	6	2	3	6	6
8	(Australia) Schwartz	3	6	6	2	3
4	(Australia) Bromwich	6	6	6
5	(Australia) Turnbull	2	2	0

Semifinals
1	(Australia) Crawford	1	9	4	6
4	(Australia) Bromwich	6	7	6	8

==== Section 2 ====
First round
(Australia) Turvey	4	6	6	6
(Australia) Kelly	6	4	4	2
6	(Australia) A. Kay	6	6	8
(Australia) Lewis	3	4	6
(Australia) Thompson	6	6	6
(Australia) Weston	0	1	2
3	(Australia) McGrath	6	6	6
(Australia) Lovett	2	1	3
(Australia) Harper	6	0	6	6
(Australia) Lindo	4	6	2	2
7	(Australia) Hopman	5	6	7	6
(Australia) Pails	7	3	5	2
(Australia) Huxley	9	7	6
(Australia) Holland	7	5	2
2	(Australia) Quist	6	6	6
(Australia) Chrystal	0	3	3

Second round
(Australia) Turvey	5	3	1
6	(Australia) A. Kay	7	6	6
(Australia) Thompson	7	6	5	5	2
3	(Australia) McGrath	5	4	7	7	6
(Australia) Harper	2	2	1
7	(Australia) Hopman	6	6	6
(Australia) Huxley	2	0	4
2	(Australia) Quist	6	6	6

Quarterfinals
6	(Australia) A. Kay	2	2	6
3	(Australia) McGrath	6	6	8
7	(Australia) Hopman	11	3	7	6
2	(Australia) Quist	9	6	5	3

Semifinals
3	(Australia) McGrath	6	6	7
7	(Australia) Hopman	4	1	5

Preceded by 1936 U.S. National Championships	Grand Slam men's singles	Succeeded by 1937 French Championships
