= 1936 Australian Championships – Women's singles =

Women's singles
- 1936 Australian Championships

Final
- Champion: (Australia) Joan Hartigan
- Runner-up: (Australia) Nancye Wynne
- Score: 6–4, 6–4

Details
- Draw: 24
- Seeds: 8

Events
Singles	men	women		boys	girls
Doubles	men	women	mixed	boys	girls
- Australian Championships

Joan Hartigan defeated Nancye Wynne 6–4, 6–4, in the final to win the women's singles tennis title at the 1936 Australian Championships.

== Seeds ==
The seeded players are listed below. Joan Hartigan is the champion; others show the round in which they were eliminated.

1. (Australia) Thelma Coyne (semifinals)
2. (Australia) Joan Hartigan (champion)
3. (Australia) Nell Hopman (quarterfinals)
4. (Australia) Dorothy Stevenson (second round)
5. (Australia) May Blick (semifinals)
6. (Australia) Nancye Wynne (finalist)
7. (Australia) Gwen Griffiths (quarterfinals)
8. (Australia) May Hardcastle (quarterfinals)

== Draw ==
=== Key ===
- Q = Qualifier
- WC = Wild card
- LL = Lucky loser
- r = Retired

=== Finals ===
Quarterfinals
2	(Australia) Joan Hartigan	6	6
7	(Australia) Gwen Griffiths	1	4
5	(Australia) May Blick	5	6	6
(Australia) Joan Walters	7	1	1
6	(Australia) Nancye Wynne	3	6	6
3	(Australia) Nell Hopman	6	3	4
1	(Australia) Thelma Coyne	6	8
8	(Australia) May Hardcastle	2	6

Semifinals
2	(Australia) Joan Hartigan	7	6
5	(Australia) May Blick	5	3
6	(Australia) Nancye Wynne	1	7	7
1	(Australia) Thelma Coyne	6	5	5

Finals
2	(Australia) Joan Hartigan	6	6
6	(Australia) Nancye Wynne	4	4

=== Earlier rounds ===
==== Section 1 ====
First round
2	(Australia) Joan Hartigan	6	9
(Australia) Jean Wilson	2	7
(Australia) Kath Woodward	6	6
(Australia) Betty Ward	2	3
7	(Australia) Gwen Griffiths	6	6
(Australia) Edna Collison	1	2
(Australia) Truda Cox	6	6
(Australia) Yutha Thiemeyer	3	3

Second round
2	(Australia) Joan Hartigan	6	6
(Australia) Kath Woodward	1	4
7	(Australia) Gwen Griffiths	6	4	6
(Australia) Truda Cox	3	6	3
5	(Australia) May Blick	10	7
(Australia) Birdie Bond	8	5
(Australia) Joan Walters	6	7
4	(Australia) Dot Stevenson	4	5

Quarterfinals
2	(Australia) Joan Hartigan	6	6
7	(Australia) Gwen Griffiths	1	4
5	(Australia) May Blick	5	6	6
(Australia) Joan Walters	7	1	1

Semifinals
2	(Australia) Joan Hartigan	7	6
5	(Australia) May Blick	5	3

==== Section 2 ====
First round
6	(Australia) Nancye Wynne	6	6
(Australia) Pearl Stern	0	1
(Australia) Dorothy Weston	6	6
(Australia) Ruby Skinner	2	2
3	(Australia) Nell Hopman	6	6
(Australia) Edie Niemeyer	4	0
(Australia) Kathleen Le Messurier	6	6
(Australia) Molly Carter	0	1

Second round
6	(Australia) Nancye Wynne	6	4	7
(Australia) Dorothy Weston	0	6	5
3	(Australia) Nell Hopman	6	6
(Australia) Kathleen Le Messurier	2	3
1	(Australia) Thelma Coyne	6	6
(Australia) Gwen Stevenson	1	2
8	(Australia) May Hardcastle	7	6
(Australia) Sadie Berryman	5	4

Quarterfinals
6	(Australia) Nancye Wynne	3	6	6
3	(Australia) Nell Hopman	6	3	4
1	(Australia) Thelma Coyne	6	8
8	(Australia) May Hardcastle	2	6

Semifinals
6	(Australia) Nancye Wynne	1	7	7
1	(Australia) Thelma Coyne	6	5	5

== See also ==
- 1936 Australian Championships – Men's singles

Preceded by 1935 U.S. National Championships – Women's singles	Grand Slam women's singles	Succeeded by 1936 French Championships – Women's singles
