= 1937 Australian Championships – Women's doubles =

Women's doubles
- 1937 Australian Championships

Final
- Champions: (Australia) Thelma Coyne (Australia) Nancye Wynne
- Runners-up: (Australia) Nell Hopman (Australia) Emily Hood Westacott
- Score: 6–2, 6–2

Details
- Draw: 14
- Seeds: 4

Events
Singles	men	women		boys	girls
Doubles	men	women	mixed	boys	girls
- Australian Championships

Defending champions Thelma Coyne and Nancye Wynne defeated Nell Hopman and Emily Hood Westacott 6–2, 6–2 in the final, to win the women's doubles tennis title at the 1937 Australian Championships.

== Seeds ==
1. (Australia) Thelma Coyne / (Australia) Nancye Wynne (champions)
2. (Australia) Nell Hopman / (Australia) Emily Hood Westacott (final)
3. (Australia) May Blick / (Australia) Joan Hartigan (semifinals)
4. (Australia) Alison Hattersley / (Australia) Vera Selwin (semifinals)

== Draw ==
Key

- Q = Qualifier
- WC = Wild card
- LL = Lucky loser
- Alt = Alternate
- ITF = ITF entry
- PR = Protected ranking
- SR = Special ranking
- SE = Special exempt
- JE = Junior exempt
- JR = Junior Accelerator Programme entrant
- CO = College Accelerator Programme entrant
- NG = Next Gen Accelerator Program entrant
- w/o = Walkover
- r = Retired
- d = Defaulted

=== Draw ===
First round
(Australia) May Hardcastle (Australia) Peg Menzies	6	7
(Australia) Connie Coate (Australia) Gladys Farrell	3	5
(Australia) Thelma Rice (Australia) Olive Stebbing	0	6	6
(Australia) Dot Stevenson (Australia) Gwen Stevenson	6	1	4
4	(Australia) Alison Hattersley (Australia) Vera Selwin	6	6
(Australia) Lavinia Singleton (Australia) Pearl Stern	4	2
3	(Australia) May Blick (Australia) Joan Hartigan	6	6
(Australia) Edna McColl (Australia) Nina Vickery	4	2
(Australia) Sylvia Harper (Australia) Kath Woodward	6	6
(Australia) Betty Lipscomb (Note: Also spelled Lipscombe in many sources.) (Australia) Marjorie Moran	2	2
(Australia) Dorothy Dingle (Australia) Muff Wilson	6	2	6
(Australia) Helen Bowker (Australia) Beth Peach	3	6	0

Quarterfinals
1	(Australia) Thelma Coyne (Australia) Nancye Wynne	6	6
(Australia) May Hardcastle (Australia) Peg Menzies	3	4
(Australia) Thelma Rice (Australia) Olive Stebbing	4	4
4	(Australia) Alison Hattersley (Australia) Vera Selwin	6	6
3	(Australia) May Blick (Australia) Joan Hartigan	9	6
(Australia) Sylvia Harper (Australia) Kath Woodward	7	1
(Australia) Dorothy Dingle (Australia) Muff Wilson	0	6
2	(Australia) Nell Hopman (Australia) Emily Hood Westacott	6	8

Semifinals
1	(Australia) Thelma Coyne (Australia) Nancye Wynne	6	4 (Note: Some sources give 5–7 as a result of the second set.)	6
4	(Australia) Alison Hattersley (Australia) Vera Selwin	3	6	3
3	(Australia) May Blick (Australia) Joan Hartigan	4	3
2	(Australia) Nell Hopman (Australia) Emily Hood Westacott	6	6

Final
1	(Australia) Thelma Coyne (Australia) Nancye Wynne	6	6
2	(Australia) Nell Hopman (Australia) Emily Hood Westacott	2	2
