= Yarrabin, New South Wales =

Yarrabin (formerly Merrendee) New South Wales
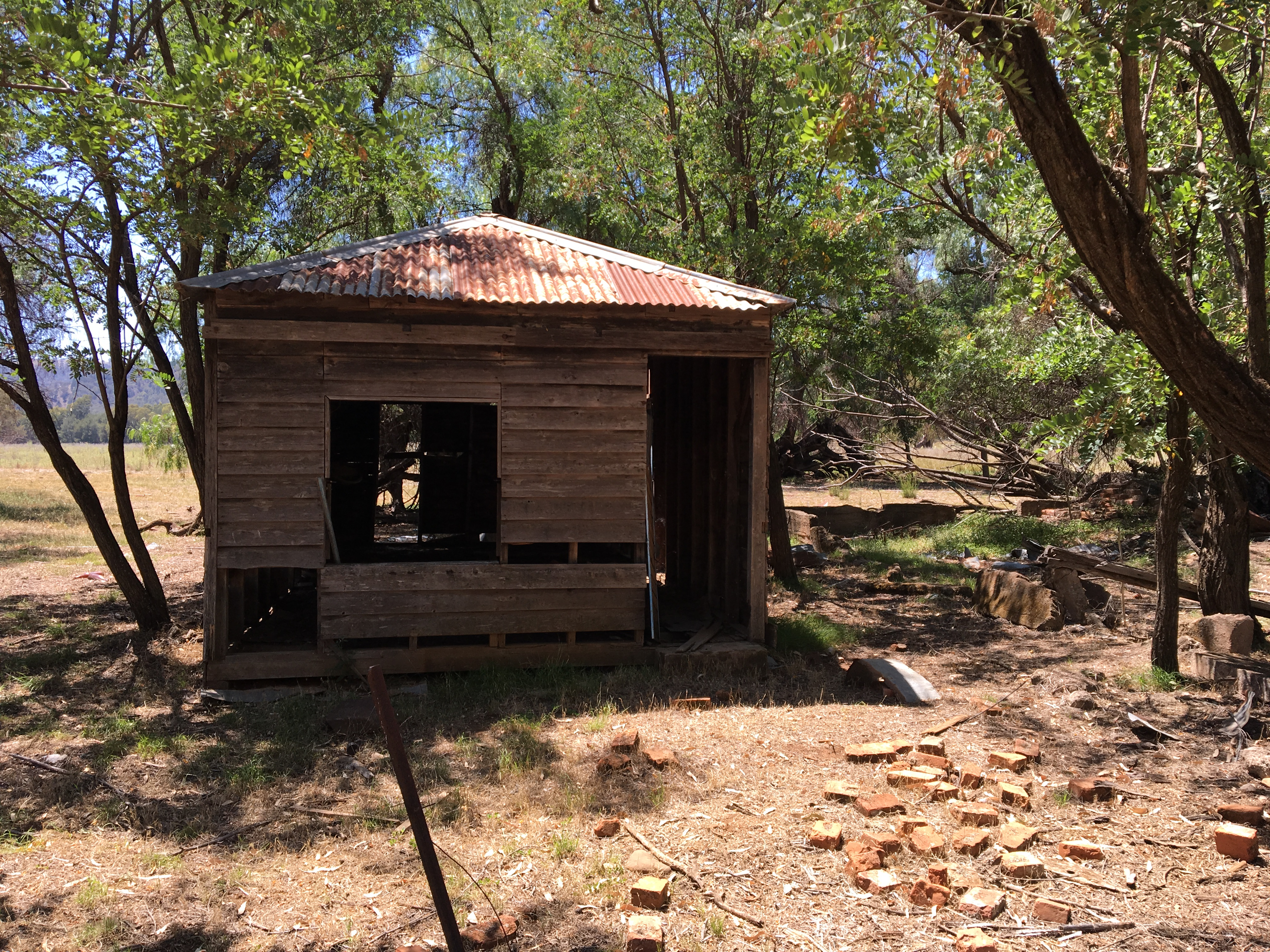
- Don Endacott's general store at Yarrabin, NSW. The foundations of the McGrath homestead "Murray King" are also visible at right.

- Coordinates: 32°35′37.043″S 149°17′38.657″E
- Population: 96 (SAL 2021)
- Established: circa 1851
- LGA(s): Mid-Western Regional Council

Yarrabin (formerly known as Merrendee) is a ghost town near the junction of the Meroo and Cudgegong rivers in the New South Wales Orana Region. The village of Merrendee was established after the discovery of gold in that area around 1851 and was located approximately 23 miles west of Mudgee. The locality was renamed Yarrabin by postal authorities in 1923.

== History ==
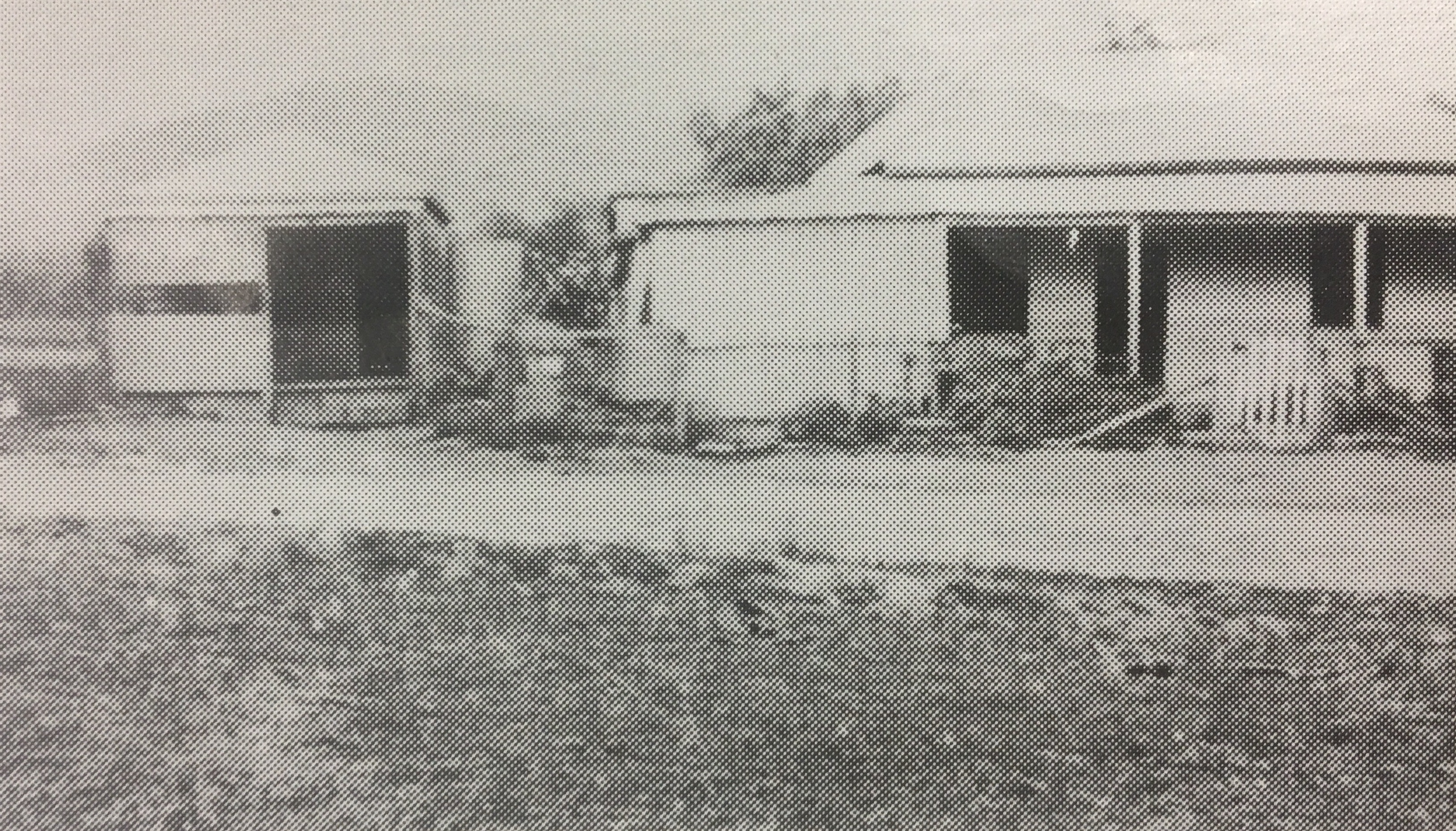
Don Endacott's store and McGrath family home "Murray King" at Yarrabin (then Merrendee), NSW. Approx. 1920

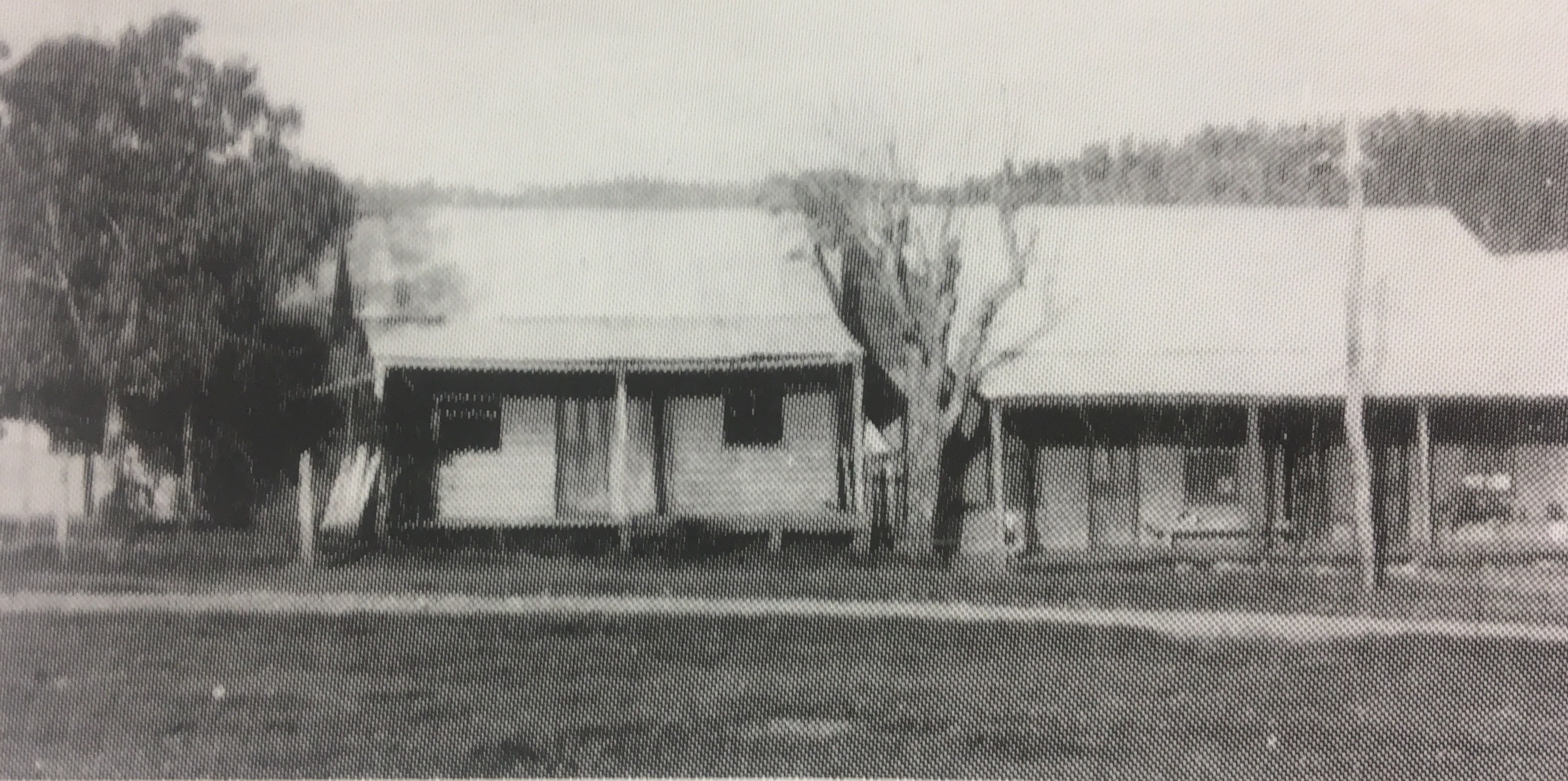
Merrendee Hotel (right) and earlier post office (left). Photographer and date unknown. Approx. 1920.

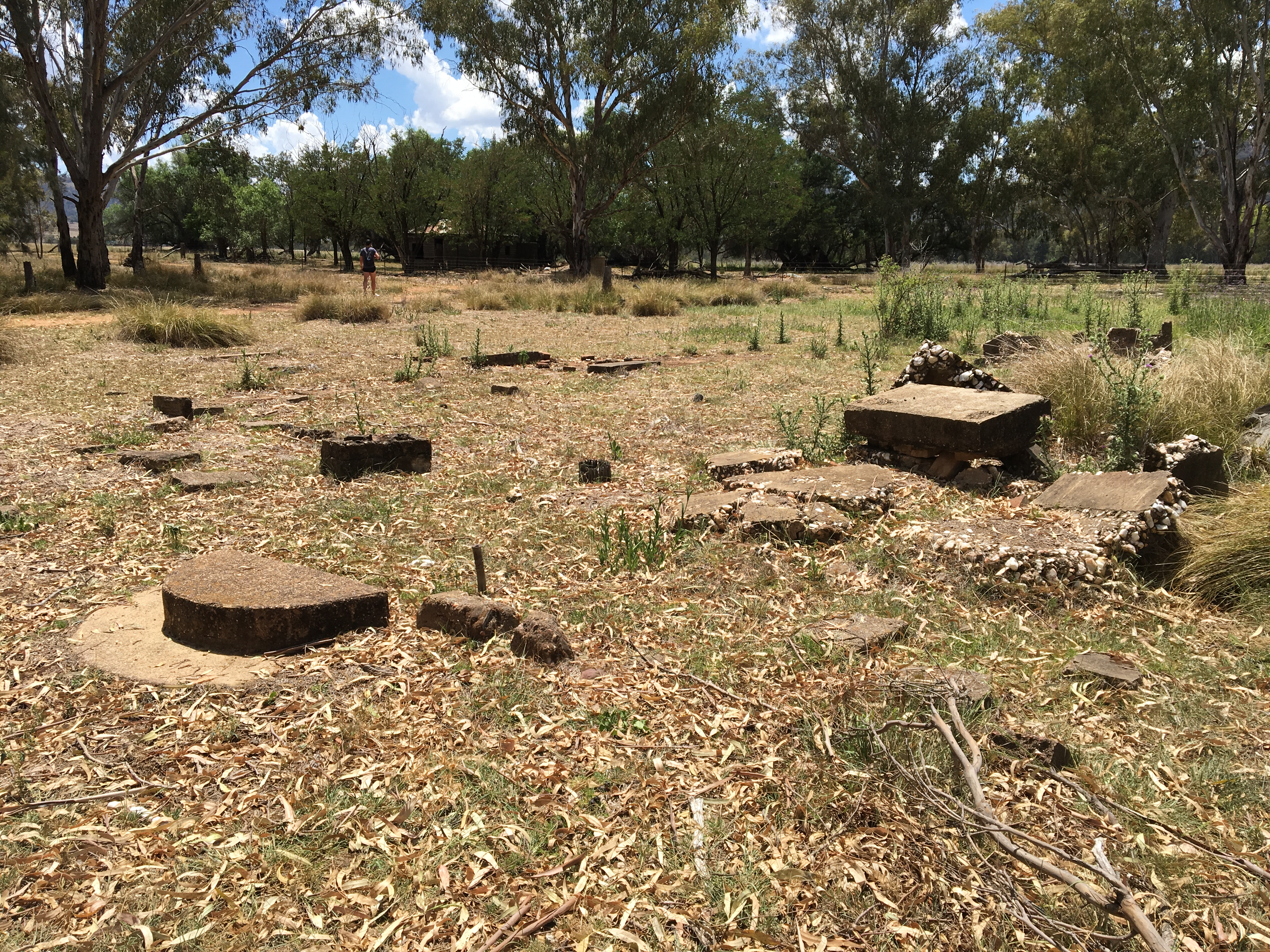
Site of the last (former) Yarrabin (Merrendee) Post Office.

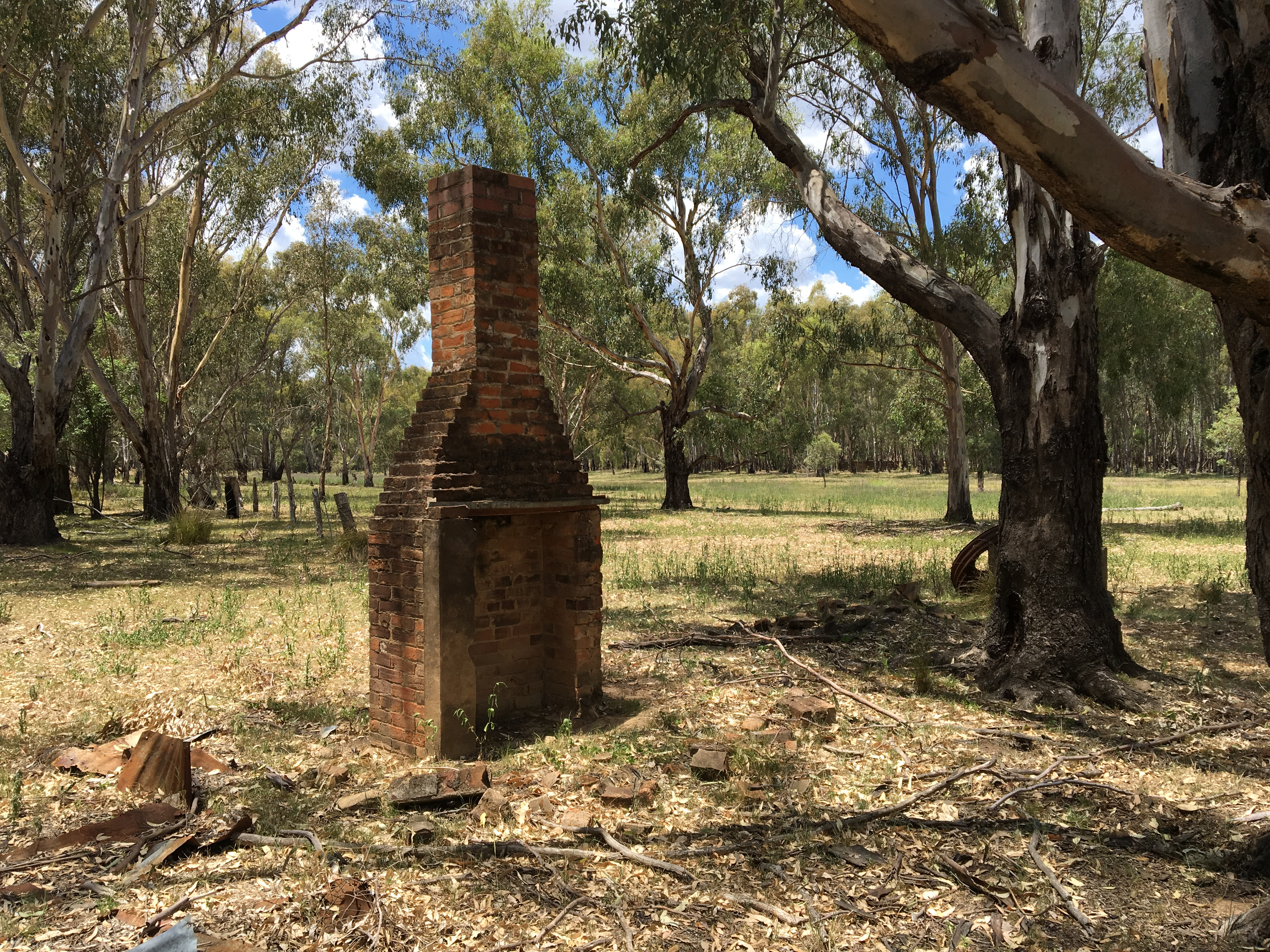
The chimney of the former Yarrabin School.

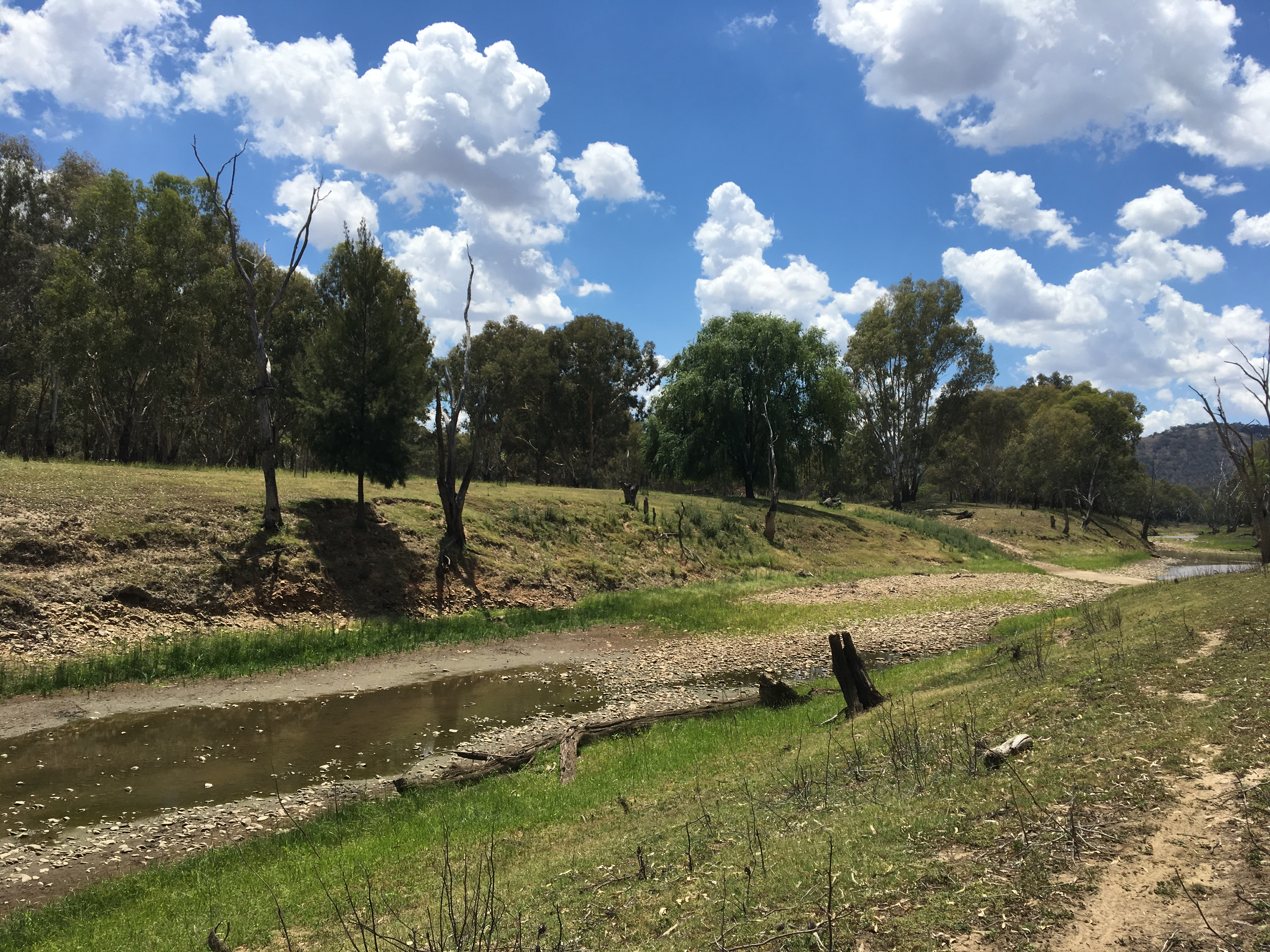
Looking towards the site of Yarrabin (Merrendee) township from the southern bank of the Meroo River. The original crossing is visible at right.

Gold was discovered by European settlers at Merrendee in approximately August 1851. By August 1857 a correspondent for The Sydney Morning Herald described how "bark and comfortable slab huts [had taken] the place of calico tents, and a little village [had] sprung up". This early account of Merrendee describes the village as being made up of "an excellent building ... being erected for a public house, and Mr. F. B. Gulley's new store, a neat pine building with verandah, fitted out quite in the Sydney style ... [as well as] ... a very neat and substantial slab store".

The first General Publicans' License in Merrendee was issued for "the house situated at Merindee [sic], in the district of Avisford, to be known as the Cricketers Arms". The license was granted to Joseph Cox and transferred to a Mr. Jones in May 1863. Other licensed establishments in the town included Richard Knight's "Merrendee Inn" (c1858) and Robert Forbes Milne's "Royal George Inn" (c1858). By 1904 the only public house in the town was Herbert Francis McGrath's "Merrendee Hotel". McGrath conducted the hotel from July 1904 until its closure in 1923 "as a result of the decree of [the] Licenses Reduction Board". The Australian tennis champion Vivian McGrath, son of Herbert and Florence McGrath, was born at the "Merrendee Hotel" in 1916.

A post office was established at Merrendee in July 1859.

By 1908 the Mudgee Guardian reported that "Merrendee of to-day, with its paucity of population, its deserted appearance, abandoned shafts, grassless paddocks, its monotony and general activity, presents a striking contrast to the Merrendee of about fifty years ago". By 1927 there were only 12 pupils enrolled at the Merrendee Provisional School "and as a rule an average daily attendance of 9 pupils and over". The school was first referred to as Yarrabin Public School in 1925. The school closed in November 1963.

A church operated in Yarrabin until at least 1947.
