= 1936 Australian Championships – Women's doubles =

Women's doubles
- 1936 Australian Championships

Final
- Champions: (Australia) Thelma Coyne (Australia) Nancye Wynne
- Runners-up: (Australia) May Blick (Australia) Kath Woodward
- Score: 6–2, 6–4

Details
- Draw: 12
- Seeds: 4

Events
Singles	men	women		boys	girls
Doubles	men	women	mixed	boys	girls
- Australian Championships

Thelma Coyne and Nancye Wynne defeated May Blick and Kath Woodward 6–2, 6–4 in the final, to win the women's doubles tennis title at the 1936 Australian Championships.

This was their first of the all-time record ten Australian Women's Doubles titles as a pair. This win also marked the start of their pre-Open Era record five consecutive Australian Women's Doubles titles streak.

== Seeds ==
1. (Australia) Joan Hartigan / (Australia) Nell Hopman (semifinals)
2. (Australia) Thelma Coyne / (Australia) Nancye Wynne (champions)
3. (Australia) May Blick / (Australia) Kath Woodward (final)
4. (Australia) Joan Walters / (Australia) Dorothy Weston (quarterfinals)

== Draw ==
Key

- Q = Qualifier
- WC = Wild card
- LL = Lucky loser
- Alt = Alternate
- ITF = ITF entry
- PR = Protected ranking
- SR = Special ranking
- SE = Special exempt
- JE = Junior exempt
- JR = Junior Accelerator Programme entrant
- CO = College Accelerator Programme entrant
- NG = Next Gen Accelerator Program entrant
- w/o = Walkover
- r = Retired
- d = Defaulted

=== Draw ===
First round
3	(Australia) May Blick (Australia) Kath Woodward	6	4	7
(Australia) May Hardcastle (Australia) Pearl Stern	2	6	5
(Australia) Sadie Berryman (Note: Initial draw pairs Truda Cox with Yutha Thiemeyer.) (Australia) Truda Cox	6	4	6
(Australia) Gwen Griffiths (Australia) Kathleen Le Messurier	4	6	1
(Australia) Birdie Bond (Australia) Gwen O'Halloran (Note: Initial draw pairs Birdie Bond with Sadie Berryman.)	6	4	6
(Australia) Cherie Bubb (Australia) Jean Colless	2	6	3
2	(Australia) Thelma Coyne (Australia) Nancye Wynne	6	6
(Australia) Betty Ward (Australia) Jean Wilson	3	4

Quarterfinals
1	(Australia) Joan Hartigan (Australia) Nell Hopman	w/o
(Australia) Molly Carter (Australia) Muff Wilson
3	(Australia) May Blick (Australia) Kath Woodward	6	6
(Australia) Sadie Berryman (Australia) Truda Cox	3	2
4	(Australia) Joan Walters (Australia) Dorothy Weston	3	0
(Australia) Dot Stevenson (Australia) Gwen Stevenson	6	6
(Australia) Birdie Bond (Australia) Gwen O'Halloran	3	3
2	(Australia) Thelma Coyne (Australia) Nancye Wynne	6	6

Semifinals
1	(Australia) Joan Hartigan (Australia) Nell Hopman	2	4
3	(Australia) May Blick (Australia) Kath Woodward	6	6
(Australia) Dot Stevenson (Australia) Gwen Stevenson	4	6
2	(Australia) Thelma Coyne (Australia) Nancye Wynne	6	8

Final
3	(Australia) May Blick (Australia) Kath Woodward	2	4
2	(Australia) Thelma Coyne (Australia) Nancye Wynne	6	6
