= 1940 Australian Championships =

- Date: 19–29 January 1940
- Edition: 33rd
- Category: Grand Slam (ITF)
- Surface: Grass
- Location: Sydney, Australia
- Venue: White City Tennis Club

Champions

Men's singles
- (Australia) Adrian Quist

Women's singles
- (Australia) Nancye Wynne

Men's doubles
- (Australia) John Bromwich / (Australia) Adrian Quist

Women's doubles
- (Australia) Thelma Coyne / (Australia) Nancye Wynne

Mixed doubles
- (Australia) Nancye Wynne / (Australia) Colin Long

Boys' singles
- (Australia) Dinny Pails

Girls' singles
- (Australia) Joyce Wood

Boys' doubles
- (Australia) William Edwards / (Australia) Dinny Pails

Girls' doubles
- (Australia) Alison Burton / (Australia) Joyce Wood
- Australian Championships

The 1940 Australian Championships was a tennis tournament that took place on outdoor Grass courts at the White City Tennis Club, Sydney, Australia from 19 January to 29 January. It was the 33rd edition of the Australian Championships (now known as the Australian Open), the 9th held in Sydney, and the first Grand Slam tournament of the year. The singles titles were won by Australians Adrian Quist and Nancye Wynne.

== Finals ==
=== Men's singles ===
(Australia) Adrian Quist defeated (Australia) Jack Crawford 6–3, 6–1, 6–2

=== Women's singles ===
(Australia) Nancye Wynne defeated (Australia) Thelma Coyne 5–7, 6–4, 6–0

=== Men's doubles ===
(Australia) John Bromwich / (Australia) Adrian Quist defeated (Australia) Jack Crawford / (Australia) Vivian McGrath 6–3, 7–5, 6–1

=== Women's doubles ===
(Australia) Thelma Coyne / (Australia) Nancye Wynne defeated (Australia) Joan Hartigan / (Australia) Edie Niemeyer 7–5, 6–2

=== Mixed doubles ===
(Australia) Nancye Wynne / (Australia) Colin Long defeated (Australia) Nell Hall Hopman / (Australia) Harry Hopman 7–5, 2–6, 6–4

Preceded by 1939 U.S. National Championships	Grand Slams	Succeeded by 1940 U.S. National Championships
