= Neville Quist =

Australian fashion designer

Neville Quist (born 1952) is an Australian fashion designer.

== Biography ==
Neville Quist was born in 1952 in Glenelg, South Australia. In 1969 he created a business selling made to measure shirts under the name Neville Quist Fashion Shirts. Quist founded the clothing label Saville Row in 1973 in Adelaide, South Australia. Saville Row shirts became a staple in menswear stores and department stores throughout Australia

In 1989 Quist developed the first animated characters patterned men's socks in Tokyo Japan . The copyright label attached to these products was Johnny Dangerous and were distributed in retail and department stores throughout thirteen European countries. Pacific Dunlop entered into a licensing agreement with Quist, as did Bonds Underwear. Michael Jackson the entertainer attempted to use the brand Dangerous on items of clothing for his Dangerous tour but was unsuccessful in doing so after Quists copyright classification was upheld in the European court ruling. Consequently, Jackson, through Triumph International, attempted to reach a resolution with Quist. The outcome of the agreement is private .

Quist was nominated five times as Australia's Leading Menswear Fashion Designer at the Australian Fashion Awards from 1991 to 1996).

Quist collaborated with Elders in 2001 and was appointed Elder’s International design consultant and developed Quist superfine knitwear, which specialises in Australian merino wool knitwear. Quist would source the wool from Australian Superfine wool growers developing a label with the history of the wool origin to market like the wine industry then spin the yarn in Biella Italy before knitting in Asia Quist knitwear has been described as the "finest knitwear in the world".

Saville Row is stocked Australia-wide and internationally.

In 2023 Neville Quist was invited to collaborate with Australian tourism icon The Quicksilver Group developing clothing and swimwear collections in organic and sustainable recycled materials including creating a breakthrough in biodegradable image technology.Plant based biodegradable iPhone covers strictly avoiding synthetic materials that featured uniquely pristine images of the fragile eco system of Australia’s natural “Wonder of the World” The Great Barrier Reef for the international tourism market. 2024 Quist has continued developing sustainable products for the Quicksilver group including Italian linen clothing and designing a swimwear collection using recycled materials
