= Cliff Harvey =

Australian tennis player

- Full name: Angus Clifford Harvey
- Country (sports): Australia
- Born: 17 May 1904 Appila, South Australia, Australia
- Died: Unknown

Singles

Grand Slam singles results
- Australian Open: 2R (1936)

Other tournaments

Angus Clifford Harvey (born 17 May 1904) was an Australian tennis player born in Appila, South Australia, Australia. He was active from 1925 to 1940. He competed at the Australian Championships in singles four times with his best performance coming in 1936 when he made the second round but lost to Harry Hopman.

During his tennis career he reached two finals at the Adelaide Metropolitan Hard Court Championships in 1936, and the Port Lincoln Open in 1939.

== Sources ==
- Source for the draw at ausopen.com
