= Adelaide Metropolitan Hard Court Championships =

Defunct tennis tournament
- Tour: ILTF World Circuit
- Founded: 1933
- Abolished: 1946
- Editions: 13
- Location: Adelaide, South Australia
- Venue: Memorial Drive Tennis Club
- Surface: Clay

The Adelaide Metropolitan Hard Court Championships was a combined open clay court tennis tournament founded in 1933. It was held annually at the Memorial Drive Tennis Club (MDTC) in Adelaide, Australia and organised by the Metropolitan Hardcourt Association until at least 1946.
