= 1937 Australian Championships – Women's singles =

Women's singles
- 1937 Australian Championships

Final
- Champion: (Australia) Nancye Wynne
- Runner-up: (Australia) Emily Hood Westacott
- Score: 6–3, 5–7, 6–4

Details
- Seeds: 8

Events
Singles	men	women		boys	girls
Doubles	men	women	mixed	boys	girls
- Australian Championships

Second-seeded Nancye Wynne defeated Emily Hood Westacott 6–3, 5–7, 6–4, in the final to win the women's singles tennis title at the 1937 Australian Championships.

== Seeds ==
The seeded players are listed below. Nancye Wynne is the champion; others show the round in which they were eliminated.

1. (Australia) Joan Hartigan (quarterfinals)
2. (Australia) Nancye Wynne (champion)
3. (Australia) Thelma Coyne (semifinals)
4. (Australia) Nell Hopman (second round)
5. (Australia) May Hardcastle (second round)
6. (Australia) Dorothy Stevenson (semifinals)
7. (Australia) Emily Hood Westacott (finalist)
8. (Australia) Gwen O'Halloran (second round)

== Draw ==
=== Key ===
- Q = Qualifier
- WC = Wild card
- LL = Lucky loser
- r = Retired

=== Finals ===
Quarterfinals
1	(Australia) Joan Hartigan	6	3	4
6	(Australia) Dorothy Stevenson	4	6	6
(Australia) Margaret Wilson	5	6
7	(Australia) Emily Hood Westacott	7	8
(Australia) Vera Selwin	1	1
3	(Australia) Thelma Coyne	6	6
(Australia) Sadie Berryman	0	1
2	(Australia) Nancye Wynne	6	6

Semifinals
6	(Australia) Dorothy Stevenson	6	6	7
7	(Australia) Emily Hood Westacott	3	8	9
3	(Australia) Thelma Coyne	5	6	4
2	(Australia) Nancye Wynne	7	4	6

Finals
7	(Australia) Emily Hood Westacott	3	7	4
2	(Australia) Nancye Wynne	6	5	6

=== Earlier rounds ===
==== Section 1 ====
First round
(Australia) Graham	5	3
1	(Australia) Hartigan	7	6
(Australia) Singleton	w/o
(Australia) Blick
(Australia) Coate	0	7
6	(Australia) Stevenson	6	9
(Australia) McColl	9	1	2
(Australia) Webb	7	6	6
(Australia) Vickery	1	0
4	(Australia) Hopman	6	6
(Australia) Rice	5	6	3
(Australia) Wilson	7	4	6
(Australia) Dingle	5	0
7	(Australia) Westacott	7	6
(Australia) Hattersley	7	4
(Australia) Stebbing	9	6

Second round
1	(Australia) Hartigan	6	6
(Australia) Blick	2	1
6	(Australia) Stevenson	6	7
(Australia) Webb	4	5
4	(Australia) Hopman	4	8
(Australia) Wilson	6	10
7	(Australia) Westacott	6	6
(Australia) Stebbing	2	1

Quarterfinals
1	(Australia) Hartigan	6	3	4
6	(Australia) Stevenson	4	6	6
(Australia) Wilson	5	6
7	(Australia) Westacott	7	8

Semifinals
6	(Australia) Stevenson	6	6	7
7	(Australia) Westacott	3	8	9

==== Section 2 ====
First round
(Australia) Peach	1	1
(Australia) Selwin	6	6
(Australia) Carter	2	0
5	(Australia) Hardcastle	6	6
(Australia) Wilson	5	6	3
(Australia) Stevenson	7	4	6
(Australia) Farrell	1	1
3	(Australia) Coyne	6	6
(Australia) Stern	w/o
(Australia) Berryman
(Australia) Moran	2	2
8	(Australia) O'Halloran	6	6
(Australia) Hunt	6	1
(Australia) Menzies	8	6

Second round
(Australia) Selwin	4	6	6
5	(Australia) Hardcastle	6	4	4
(Australia) Stevenson	2	1
3	(Australia) Coyne	6	6
(Australia) Berryman	6	6
8	(Australia) O'Halloran	4	1
(Australia) Menzies	0	4
2	(Australia) Wynne	6	6

Quarterfinals
(Australia) Selwin	1	1
3	(Australia) Coyne	6	6
(Australia) Berryman	0	1
2	(Australia) Wynne	6	6

Semifinals
3	(Australia) Coyne	5	6	4
2	(Australia) Wynne	7	4	6

Preceded by 1936 U.S. National Championships – Women's singles	Grand Slam women's singles	Succeeded by 1937 French Championships – Women's singles
