= 1937 Belmont Stakes =

American horse race

69th Belmont Stakes
- Belmont Stakes
- Grade I stakes race
- Location: Belmont Park; Elmont, New York, U.S.
- Date: June 5, 1937
- Distance: 1 1/2 mi (12 furlongs; 2,414 m)
- Winning horse: War Admiral
- Winning time: 2:28 3/5
- Jockey: Charles Kurtsinger
- Trainer: George Conway
- Owner: Samuel D. Riddle
- Surface: Dirt

The 1937 Belmont Stakes was the 69th running of the Belmont Stakes. It was the 31st Belmont Stakes held at Belmont Park in Elmont, New York and was held on June 5, 1937. With a field of seven horses, War Admiral, the winner of that year's Kentucky Derby and Preakness Stakes won the 1 1/2–mile race (12 f; 2.4 km) by 3 lengths over Sceneshifter.

With the win, War Admiral became the fourth Triple Crown champion.

== Results ==
| Finish | PP | Horse | Jockey | Trainer | Owner | Final odds | Earnings US$ |
|---|---|---|---|---|---|---|---|
| 1 | 7 | War Admiral | Charles Kurtsinger | George Conway | Samuel D. Riddle | 9–10 | $38,020 |
| 2 | 6 | Sceneshifter | James Stout | Earl Sande | Maxwell Howard | 8–1 | $5,000 |
| 3 | 1 | Vamoose | Raymond Workman | J. P. "Sammy" Smith | Falaise Stable | 60–1 | $2,500 |
| 4 | 4 | Brooklyn | Wayne D. Wright | Herbert J. Thompson | Edward R. Bradley | 6–1 | $1,000 |
| 5 | 5 | Flying Scot | John Gilbert | John M. Gaver Sr. | John Hay Whitney | 12–1 | |
| 6 | 3 | Pompoon | Harry Richards | Cyrus Field Clarke | Jerome H. Loucheim | 3½-1 | |
| 7 | 2 | Melodist | Johnny Longden | James E. Fitzsimmons | Wheatley Stable | 20–1 | |

- Winning breeder: Samuel D. Riddle; (KY)
