= 1940 Australian Championships – Women's singles =

Women's singles
- 1940 Australian Championships

Final
- Champion: (Australia) Nancye Wynne
- Runner-up: (Australia) Thelma Coyne
- Score: 5–7, 6–4, 6–0

Details
- Draw: 19 (Note: Original draw gives 22 players.)
- Seeds: 8

Events
Singles	men	women		boys	girls
Doubles	men	women	mixed	boys	girls
- Australian Championships

First-seeded Nancye Wynne defeated Thelma Coyne 5–7, 6–4, 6–0 in the final to win the women's singles tennis title at the 1940 Australian Championships.

== Seeds ==
The seeded players are listed below. Nancye Wynne is the champion; others show the round in which they were eliminated.

1. (Australia) Nancye Wynne (champion)
2. (Australia) Thelma Coyne (finalist)
3. (Australia) Nell Hopman (semifinals)
4. (Australia) May Hardcastle (quarterfinals)
5. (Australia) Joan Hartigan (semifinals)
6. (Australia) Alison Hattersley (quarterfinals)
7. (Australia) Gwen O'Halloran (quarterfinals)
8. (Australia) Constance Coate (quarterfinals)

== Draw ==
=== Key ===
- Q = Qualifier
- WC = Wild card
- LL = Lucky loser
- r = Retired

=== Finals ===
Quarterfinals
2	(Australia) Thelma Coyne	6	6
8	(Australia) Constance Coate	1	3
3	(Australia) Nell Hopman	6	6
6	(Australia) Alison Hattersley	3	4
5	(Australia) Joan Hartigan	6	6
4	(Australia) May Hardcastle	2	3
7	(Australia) Gwen O'Halloran	0	3
1	(Australia) Nancye Wynne	6	6

Semifinals
2	(Australia) Thelma Coyne	6	2	6
3	(Australia) Nell Hopman	4	6	3
5	(Australia) Joan Hartigan	0	6	1
1	(Australia) Nancye Wynne	6	3	6

Finals
2	(Australia) Thelma Coyne	7	4	0
1	(Australia) Nancye Wynne	5	6	6

=== Earlier rounds ===
==== Section 1 ====
First round
(Australia) Rice	n/a (Note: According to the initial draw. Apparently those matches were never played.)
(Australia) Turner
6	(Australia) Hattersley	6	6
(Australia) Chapman	1	2
(Australia) Niemeyer	6	6
(Australia) Gosbell	2	4

Second round
2	(Australia) Coyne	6	6
(Australia) Burke	0	1
8	(Australia) Coate	6	6	6
(Australia) Lack	2	8	3
3	(Australia) Hopman	6	6
(Australia) Clark (Note: Not in an initial draw. Apparently added to the draw after withdrawal of both Miss Rice and Miss Turner.)	0	1
6	(Australia) Hattersley	6	4	8
(Australia) Niemeyer	1	6	6

Quarterfinals
2	(Australia) Coyne	6	6
8	(Australia) Coate	1	3
3	(Australia) Hopman	6	6
6	(Australia) Hattersley	3	4

Semifinals
2	(Australia) Coyne	6	2	6
3	(Australia) Hopman	4	6	3

==== Section 2 ====
First round
7	(Australia) O'Halloran	6	6
(Australia) Manzie	0	0
(Australia) Berg	n/a
(Australia) Jenkins

Second round
5	(Australia) Hartigan	6	6
(Australia) Brooker	2	2
4	(Australia) Hardcastle	6	18
(Australia) Lewin	2	16
(Australia) Stebbing	1	7
7	(Australia) O'Halloran	6	9
(Australia) Griffiths (Note: Because of apparent withdrawal of both Miss Berg and Miss Jenkins from the event, this encounter actually became the second round match, even if sources clearly name it the first round match (as it was originally drawn as such).)	0	0
1	(Australia) Wynne	6	6

Quarterfinals
5	(Australia) Hartigan	6	6
4	(Australia) Hardcastle	2	3
7	(Australia) O'Halloran	0	3
1	(Australia) Wynne	6	6

Semifinals
5	(Australia) Hartigan	0	6	1
1	(Australia) Wynne	6	3	6

== Notes and references ==
Notes

Preceded by 1939 U.S. National Championships – Women's singles	Grand Slam women's singles	Succeeded by 1940 U.S. National Championships – Women's singles
