= 1936–37 Plunket Shield season =

Cricket tournament in New Zealand

1936–37 Plunket Shield
- Cricket format: First-class
- Tournament format(s): Round-robin
- Champions: Auckland
- Participants: 4
- Matches: 6

The 1936–37 Plunket Shield season was the sixteenth season where the Plunket Shield, the domestic first-class cricket competition of New Zealand, was competed as a league. Auckland won the championship.

== Table ==
Table
| Team | Played | W | L | DWF | DLF | Pts |
|---|---|---|---|---|---|---|
| | | 8 | | 4 | 2 | |
| Auckland | 3 | 2 | 0 | 0 | 1 | 18 |
| Otago | 3 | 1 | 1 | 0 | 1 | 10 |
| Canterbury | 3 | 0 | 1 | 2 | 0 | 8 |
| Wellington | 3 | 0 | 1 | 1 | 1 | 6 |

=== Results ===
| | Auckland | Canterbury | Otago | Wellington |
|---|---|---|---|---|
| Auckland | | | | 5-9 Feb; Auckland; 3 wickets |
| Canterbury | 25-29 Dec; Match drawn | | | 1-5 Jan; Match drawn |
| Otago | 31 Dec-4 Jan; Auckland inns & 175 | 19-23 Feb; Otago; 66 runs | | |
| Wellington | | | 25-29 Dec; Match drawn | |

| Home team won | Visiting team won | Match drawn |

== Round 1 ==
25–29 December 1936
Scorecard

| Canterbury (H) | v | Auckland |
| 280 (136.1 overs) | | 278 (88 overs) |
| 164 (70.5 overs) |

Match drawn
Lancaster Park, Christchurch

- There was no play on the third day
- 27 December was taken as a rest day

25–29 December 1936
Scorecard

| Wellington (H) | v | Otago |
| 249 (102.1 overs) | | 142 (64.4 overs) |
| 125/7d (56 overs) | | 127/7 (47 overs) |

Match drawn
Basin Reserve, Wellington

- There was no play on the first or third days
- 27 December was taken as a rest day

== Round 2 ==
31 December 1936 – 4 January 1937
Scorecard

| Auckland | v | Otago (H) |
| 550/5d (130.2 overs) | | 181 (126.4 overs) |
| | | 194 (f/o) (92.4 overs) |

Auckland won by an innings and 175 runs
Carisbrook, Dunedin

- There was no play on the second day
- 3 January was taken as a rest day

1–5 January 1937
Scorecard

| Wellington | v | Canterbury (H) |
| 183 (98.5 overs) | | 430/6d (132 overs) |
| 194/3 (102 overs) |

Match drawn
Lancaster Park, Christchurch

- There was no play on the fourth day
- 3 January was taken as a rest day

== Round 3 ==
5–9 February 1937
Scorecard

| Wellington | v | Auckland (H) |
| 445 (150.4 overs) | | 438 (129.4 overs) |
| 337 (117.4 overs) | | 347/7 (122.2 overs) |

Auckland won by 3 wickets
Eden Park, Auckland

- 7 February was taken as a rest day

19–23 February 1937
Scorecard

| Otago (H) | v | Canterbury |
| 124 (38.5 overs) | | 243 (115.4 overs) |
| 451 (132.3 overs) | | 266 (107.2 overs) |

Otago won by 66 runs
Carisbrook, Dunedin

- 21 February was taken as a rest day
