= Max Newcombe =

Australian tennis player

- Country (sports): Australia

Singles

Grand Slam singles results
- Australian Open: QF (1940)

Doubles

Grand Slam doubles results
- Australian Open: F (1946)

Mixed doubles

Grand Slam mixed doubles results
- Australian Open: QF (1940)

Douglas Maxwell Newcombe was an Australian amateur tennis player who competed in the 1930s and 1940s. He reached the quarterfinals of the Australian Championships in 1940 and won the junior singles in 1938. In 1946, he was runner-up in the men's doubles (partnering Len Schwartz).

== Grand Slam finals ==
=== Doubles: 1 runner-up ===
Result	Year	Championship	Surface	Partner	Opponents	Score
Loss	1946	Australian Championships	Grass	(Australia) Len Schwartz	(Australia) John Bromwich (Australia) Adrian Quist	3–6, 1–6, 7–9
