= 1940 Australian Championships – Women's doubles =

Women's doubles
- 1940 Australian Championships

Final
- Champions: (Australia) Thelma Coyne (Australia) Nancye Wynne
- Runners-up: (Australia) Joan Hartigan (Australia) Edie Niemeyer
- Score: 7–5, 6–2

Details
- Draw: 11
- Seeds: 4

Events
Singles	men	women		boys	girls
Doubles	men	women	mixed	boys	girls
- Australian Championships

Thelma Coyne and Nancye Wynne secured their fifth consecutive title by defeating Joan Hartigan and Edie Niemeyer 7–5, 6–2 in the final, to win the women's doubles tennis title at the 1940 Australian Championships.

== Seeds ==
1. (Australia) Thelma Coyne / (Australia) Nancye Wynne (champions)
2. (Australia) May Hardcastle / (Australia) Nell Hopman (quarterfinals)
3. (Australia) Alison Hattersley / (Australia) Olive Stebbing (semifinals)
4. (Australia) Joan Hartigan / (Australia) Edie Niemeyer (final)

== Draw ==
Key

- Q = Qualifier
- WC = Wild card
- LL = Lucky loser
- Alt = Alternate
- ITF = ITF entry
- PR = Protected ranking
- SR = Special ranking
- SE = Special exempt
- JE = Junior exempt
- JR = Junior Accelerator Programme entrant
- CO = College Accelerator Programme entrant
- NG = Next Gen Accelerator Program entrant
- w/o = Walkover
- r = Retired
- d = Defaulted

=== Draw ===
First round
4	(Australia) Joan Hartigan (Australia) Edie Niemeyer	6	6
(Australia) Mary Chapman (Australia) Pat Searl (Note: In the original draw Mary Chapman plays with a 'partner', while Pat Searl makes a team with Beth Peach and they are drawn against Coyne/Wynne.)	1	3
(Australia) Doris Mauger (Australia) Gwen O'Halloran	w/o
(Australia) Clare Proctor (Australia) Thelma Rice
1	(Australia) Thelma Coyne (Australia) Nancye Wynne	w/o
(Australia) Beth Peach (Note: Apparent withdrawal of Beth Peach. Pat Searl becomes the 'partner' of Mary Chapman.) (Australia) Pat Searl

Quarterfinals
(Australia) Rosemary Rees (Australia) Kath Woodward	9	3	6
2	(Australia) May Hardcastle (Australia) Nell Hopman	7	6	4
4	(Australia) Joan Hartigan (Australia) Edie Niemeyer	7	6
(Australia) Doris Mauger (Australia) Gwen O'Halloran	5	2
1	(Australia) Thelma Coyne (Australia) Nancye Wynne	w/o
(Australia) Vivienne Berg (Note: Miss Berg withdrew due to injury.) (Australia) Dorothy Jenkins
3	(Australia) Alison Hattersley (Australia) Olive Stebbing	6	6
(Australia) Connie Coate (Australia) Audrey Lewin	2	1

Semifinals
(Australia) Rosemary Rees (Australia) Kath Woodward	5	4
4	(Australia) Joan Hartigan (Australia) Edie Niemeyer	7	6
1	(Australia) Thelma Coyne (Australia) Nancye Wynne	6	6
3	(Australia) Alison Hattersley (Australia) Olive Stebbing	2	3

Final
4	(Australia) Joan Hartigan (Australia) Edie Niemeyer	5	2
1	(Australia) Thelma Coyne (Australia) Nancye Wynne	7	6
