= Abel Kay =

Australian tennis player

- Full name: Abel Alexander Kay
- Country (sports): Australia
- Born: 7 March 1911 Mitcham, Victoria, Australia
- Died: 26 September 2004 (aged 93) Berwick, Victoria, Australia
- Turned pro: 1932 (amateur tour)
- Retired: 1947

Grand Slam singles results
- Australian Open: SF (1936)

Grand Slam doubles results
- Australian Open: SF (1936)

Grand Slam mixed doubles results
- Australian Open: F (1936)

Abel Kay (1911–2004) was an Australian tennis player. He was renowned for his fitness and played several sports to a good standard. As a boxer he was Victorian amateur welterweight champion in 1931. He also played football and water polo. Entering the Australian Championships for the first time in 1933, Kay lost in round one to Wilmer Allison. The following year he lost his first match to Harry Lee in five sets. In 1935 he lost his first match to Enrique Maier. In 1936 Kay reached the semi-finals (beating Don Turnbull before losing to Jack Crawford). The following year he lost to Vivian McGrath in the quarter-finals. In 1939 he lost in round one to James Gilchrist.

== Grand Slam finals ==
=== Mixed Doubles (1 runner-up) ===
Result	Year	Championship	Surface	Partner	Opponents	Score
Runner-up	1936	Australian Championships	Grass	(Australia) May Blick	(Australia) Nell Hall Hopman (Australia) Harry Hopman	2–6, 0–6
