= Adrian Quist =

Australian tennis player (1913–1991)

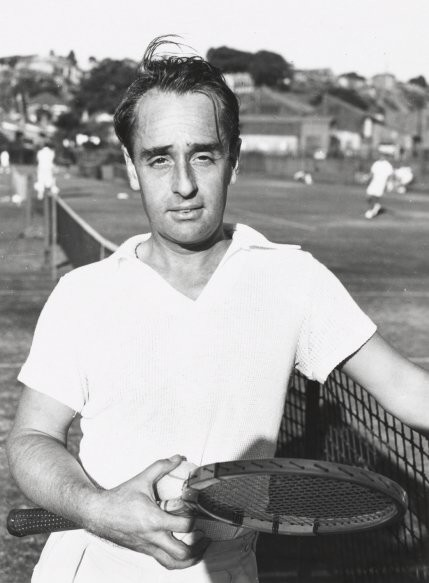
- Full name: Adrian Karl Quist
- Country (sports): Australia
- Born: 23 January 1913 Medindie, South Australia, Australia
- Died: 17 November 1991 (aged 78) Sydney, New South Wales, Australia
- Turned pro: 1930 (amateur tour)
- Retired: 1955
- Plays: Right-handed (one-handed backhand)
- Int. Tennis HoF: 1984 (member page)

Singles
- Career record: 517–147 (77.8%)
- Career titles: 46
- Highest ranking: No. 3 (1939, Gordon Lowe)

Grand Slam singles results
- Australian Open: W (1936, 1940, 1948)
- French Open: 4R (1935)
- Wimbledon: QF (1936)
- US Open: QF (1933)

Grand Slam doubles results
- Australian Open: W (1936, 1937, 1938, 1939, 1940, 1946, 1947, 1948, 1949, 1950)
- French Open: W (1935)
- Wimbledon: W (1935, 1950)
- US Open: W (1939)

Team competitions
- Davis Cup: W (1939)

Adrian Karl Quist (23 January 1913 – 17 November 1991) was an Australian tennis player.

== Biography ==
Adrian Quist was born in Medindie, South Australia. His father was Karl Quist, who had been a noted interstate cricketer, and owned a sporting goods store at the time of his son's birth. Quist grew up in Adelaide and once played Harry Hopman, but lost, having given Hopman a head start. He was a three-time Australian Championships men's singles champion but is primarily remembered today as a great doubles player. He won 10 consecutive Australian doubles titles between 1936 and 1950, the last eight together with John Bromwich and he was also one of the winners of a "Career Doubles Slam". Quist was ranked World No. 3 in singles in 1939 and World No. 4 in 1936.

His most famous singles win was a crucial singles match in the 1939 Davis Cup Challenge Round at Merion Cricket Club against the U.S., defeating world No. 1 Bobby Riggs in a close five set match in the fourth rubber. Australia would win the Davis Cup that year with a singles win by John Bromwich against Frank Parker in the fifth rubber.

In his 1979 autobiography tennis great Jack Kramer writes that in doubles "Quist played the backhand court. He had a dink backhand that was better for doubles than singles, and a classic forehand drive with a natural sink. He was also fine at the net, volley and forehand."

After retiring from playing the game, Quist became a journalist, best known for his articles in The Sydney Morning Herald. Quist also worked for Dunlop, where he designed the Dunlop Volley tennis shoe which is still in production.

Quist was inducted into the International Tennis Hall of Fame in Newport, Rhode Island, in 1984.

Adrian Quist also held the most Davis Cup victories by any Australian until Lleyton Hewitt surpassed that record on 18 September 2010 in Cairns.

He died in Sydney, New South Wales in 1991, aged 78.

Adrian Quist is the uncle of fashion designer Neville Quist, founding director of Saville Row.

== Personal life ==
Quist married Sylvia, the daughter of Erna Keighley and Albert William Keighley, a successful businessman who died in 1949 and left an estate worth nearly £300,000.

Adrian and Sylvia Quist had two children but the marriage was not successful. In 1950, Sylvia obtained a court order to instruct her husband to return home to his wife and children.

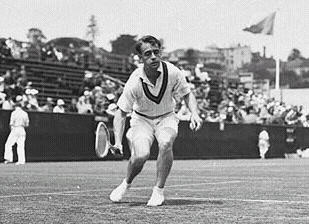
Adrian Quist hitting a low volley in the 1930s

== Grand Slam finals ==
=== Singles (3 titles, 1 runner-up) ===
Result	Year	Championship	Surface	Opponent	Score
Win	1936	Australian Championships	Grass	(Australia) Jack Crawford	6–2, 6–3, 4–6, 3–6, 9–7
Loss	1939	Australian Championships	Grass	(Australia) John Bromwich	4–6, 1–6, 3–6
Win	1940	Australian Championships	Grass	(Australia) Jack Crawford	6–3, 6–1, 6–2
Win	1948	Australian Championships	Grass	(Australia) John Bromwich	6–4, 3–6, 6–3, 2–6, 6–3

=== Doubles: (14 titles, 4 runner-ups) ===
Result	Year	Championship	Surface	Partner	Opponents	Score
Loss	1933	French Championships	Clay	(Australia) Vivian McGrath	(United Kingdom) Pat Hughes (United Kingdom) Fred Perry	2–6, 4–6, 6–2, 5–7
Loss	1934	Australian Championships	Grass	(Australia) Don Turnbull	(United Kingdom) Pat Hughes (United Kingdom) Fred Perry	8–6, 3–6, 4–6, 6–3, 3–6
Win	1935	French Championships	Clay	(Australia) Jack Crawford	(Australia) Donald Turnbull (Australia) Vivian McGrath	6–1, 6–4, 6–2
Win	1935	Wimbledon	Grass	(Australia) Jack Crawford	(United States) Wilmer Allison (United States) John Van Ryn	6–3, 5–7, 6–2, 5–7, 7–5
Win	1936	Australian Championships	Grass	(Australia) Don Turnbull	(Australia) Jack Crawford (Australia) Vivian McGrath	6–8, 6–2, 6–1, 3–6, 6–2
Win	1937	Australian Championships	Grass	(Australia) Don Turnbull	(Australia) John Bromwich (Australia) Jack Harper	6–2, 9–7, 1–6, 6–8, 6–4
Win	1938	Australian Championships	Grass	(Australia) John Bromwich	(Germany) Gottfried von Cramm (Germany) Henner Henkel	7–5, 6–4, 6–0
Loss	1938	U.S. Championships	Grass	(Australia) John Bromwich	(United States) Don Budge (United States) Gene Mako	3–6, 2–6, 1–6
Win	1939	Australian Championships	Grass	(Australia) John Bromwich	(Australia) Colin Long (Australia) Don Turnbull	6–4, 7–5, 6–2
Win	1939	U.S. Championships	Grass	(Australia) John Bromwich	(Australia) Jack Crawford (Australia) Harry Hopman	8–6, 6–1, 6–4
Win	1940	Australian Championships	Grass	(Australia) John Bromwich	(Australia) Jack Crawford (Australia) Vivian McGrath	6–3, 7–5, 6–1
Win	1946	Australian Championships	Grass	(Australia) John Bromwich	(Australia) Max Newcombe (Australia) Leonard Schwartz	6–3, 6–1, 9–7
Win	1947	Australian Championships	Grass	(Australia) John Bromwich	(Australia) Frank Sedgman (Australia) George Worthington	6–1, 6–3, 6–1
Win	1948	Australian Championships	Grass	(Australia) John Bromwich	(Australia) Frank Sedgman (Australia) Colin Long	1–6, 6–8, 9–7, 6–3, 8–6
Win	1949	Australian Championships	Grass	(Australia) John Bromwich	(Australia) Geoffrey Brown (Australia) Bill Sidwell	1–6, 7–5, 6–2, 6–3
Win	1950	Australian Championships	Grass	(Australia) John Bromwich	(Egypt) Jaroslav Drobný (South Africa) Eric Sturgess	6–3, 5–7, 4–6, 6–3, 8–6
Win	1950	Wimbledon	Grass	(Australia) John Bromwich	(Australia) Geoff Brown (Australia) Bill Sidwell	7–5, 3–6, 6–3, 3–6, 6–2
Loss	1951	Australian Championships	Grass	(Australia) John Bromwich	(Australia) Frank Sedgman (Australia) Ken McGregor	9–11, 6–2, 3–6, 6–4, 3–6

=== Mixed Doubles: (1 runner-up) ===
Result	Year	Championship	Surface	Partner	Opponents	Score
Loss	1934	French Championships	Clay	(United States) Elizabeth Ryan	(France) Colette Rosambert (France) Jean Borotra	2–6, 4–6

== Grand Slam singles performance timeline ==
Key
W	F	SF	QF	#R	RR	Q#	DNQ	A	NH

(W) winner; (F) finalist; (SF) semifinalist; (QF) quarterfinalist; (#R) rounds 4, 3, 2, 1; (RR) round-robin stage; (Q#) qualification round; (DNQ) did not qualify; (A) absent; (NH) not held; (SR) strike rate (events won / competed); (W–L) win–loss record.

Tournament	1930	1931	1932	1933	1934	1935	1936	1937	1938	1939	1940	1941	1942	1943	1944	1945	1946	1947	1948	1949	1950	1951	1952	1953	1954	1955	SR	W–L	Win %
Australia	1R	2R	3R	QF	SF	SF	W	QF	SF	F	W	NH	NH	NH	NH	NH	SF	QF	W	QF	A	QF	3R	2R	A	A	3 / 18	44–15	74.6
France	A	A	A	2R	3R	4R	A	A	A	A	NH	NH	NH	NH	NH	NH	A	A	A	A	3R	A	A	A	A	A	0 / 4	6–4	60.0
Wimbledon	A	A	A	2R	4R	3R	QF	A	A	A	NH	NH	NH	NH	NH	NH	A	A	A	A	4R	A	A	A	A	3R	0 / 6	15–6	71.4
United States	A	A	A	QF	A	A	A	A	4R	4R	A	A	A	A	A	A	A	A	4R	A	A	A	A	A	A	A	0 / 4	11–4	73.3
Win–loss	0–1	0–1	1–1	7–4	7–3	8–3	9–1	2–1	6–2	5–0	0–0	0–0	0–0	0–0	0–0	0–0	3–1	2–1	7–1	2–1	5–2	2–1	1–1	1–1	0–0	2–1	3 / 32	76–29	72.4
