= Jack Harper (tennis) =

Australian tennis player

- Full name: Jack Edwin Harper
- Country (sports): Australia
- Born: 8 April 1914 Melbourne, Australia
- Died: 17 January 2005 (aged 90) Melbourne, Australia

Singles

Grand Slam singles results
- Australian Open: QF (1946)
- Wimbledon: 4R (1948)

Doubles

Grand Slam doubles results
- Australian Open: F (1937)
- Wimbledon: SF (1948)

Mixed doubles

Grand Slam mixed doubles results
- Australian Open: 1R (1935)
- Wimbledon: 3R (1946, 1947)

Jack Edwin "Jock" Harper (8 April 1914 – 17 January 2005) was an Australian amateur tennis player who competed mainly in the 1930s and 1940s. He reached the quarterfinals of the Australian Championships in 1946 and was runner-up in the men's doubles in 1937 partnering John Bromwich.

In April 1946 Harper lost just a single point when he defeated J. Sandiford 6–0, 6–0 at the Surrey Open Hard Court Championships in a match that lasted 18 minutes, the shortest singles match on record.

== Grand Slam finals ==
=== Doubles: (1 runner-up) ===
Result	Year	Championship	Surface	Partner	Opponents	Score
Loss	1937	Australian Championships	Grass	(Australia) John Bromwich	(Australia) Adrian Quist (Australia) Don Turnbull	2–6, 7–9, 6–1, 8–6, 4–6
