= Dorothy Stevenson =

Australian tennis player

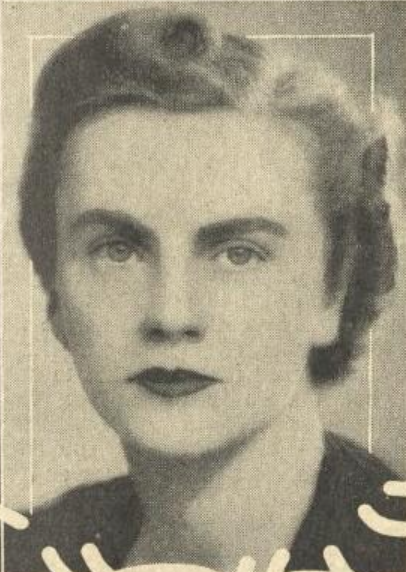
- Country (sports): Australia
- Born: c. 1916; Victoria, Australia

Singles

Grand Slam singles results
- Australian Open: F (1938)
- French Open: QF (1938)
- Wimbledon: 1R (1938)

Doubles

Grand Slam doubles results
- Australian Open: SF (1939)
- Wimbledon: 3R (1938)

Grand Slam mixed doubles results
- Australian Open: F (1937)
- Wimbledon: 1R (1938)

Dorothy 'Dot' Stevenson (born c.1916) was an Australian tennis player who was active in the 1930s.

== Career ==
Partnering compatriot Don Turnbull she reached the final of the mixed event at the 1937 Australian Championships which they lost in three sets to the husband and wife team of Nell Hall Hopman and Harry Hopman.

In 1938 she was runner-up in the singles event of the Australian Championship, losing the final in straight sets to Dorothy Cheney. In the semifinal she had defeated second-seeded and reigning champion Nancye Wynne. Owing to this result she was selected as a member of the Australian women's team that toured overseas in 1938. During the tour she competed in the French Championships where she reached the quarterfinal of the singles event where first-seed and eventual champions Simonne Mathieu proved too strong. At the Wimbledon Championships she lost in the first round of the singles event in three sets to third-seeded Jadwiga Jędrzejowska. Partnering Nell Hopman she lost in the third round of the doubles competition against the first seeded team of Simonne Mathieu and Billie Yorke.

== Personal life ==
Dorothy was the younger daughter of Ruth and Ernest A. Stevenson (died 9 April 1942) of "Mayfield", Langham Place, Upper Hawthorn, Victoria She married John Victor Waddell in Melbourne on 1 February 1940. Her sister Gwyndoline "Gwen" (1908–1950) was also a tennis player. While she was in England on her 1938 overseas tour her brother Ernest died in Melbourne of pneumonia.

== Grand Slam finals ==
=== Singles (1 runner-up) ===
Result	Year	Championship	Surface	Opponent	Score
Loss	1938	Australian Championships	Grass	(United States) Dorothy Cheney	3–6, 2–6

=== Mixed doubles (1 runner-up) ===
Result	Year	Championship	Surface	Partner	Opponents	Score
Loss	1937	Australian Championships	Grass	(Australia) Don Turnbull	(Australia) Nell Hall Hopman (Australia) Harry Hopman	6–3, 3–6, 2–6
