= Vivian McGrath =

Australian tennis player

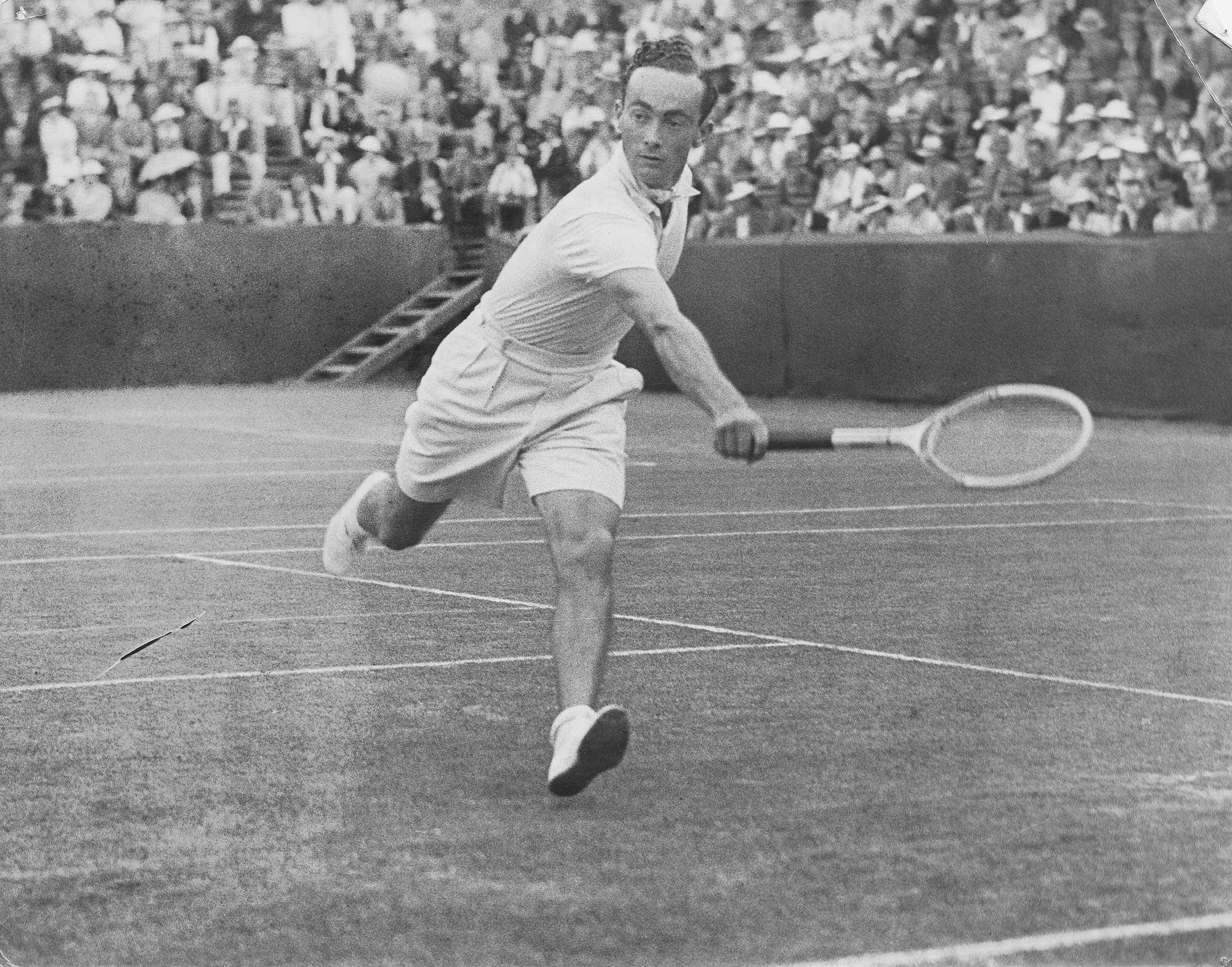
- McGrath in 1935.
- Full name: Vivian Erzerum Bede McGrath
- Country (sports): Australia
- Born: 17 February 1916; Merrendee, NSW, Australia
- Died: 9 April 1978 (aged 62); Burradoo, NSW, Australia
- Turned pro: Slam debut in 1932
- Retired: 1950s
- Plays: Right-handed (two-handed both sides)

Singles
- Highest ranking: No. 8 (1935, A. Wallis Myers)

Grand Slam singles results
- Australian Open: W (1937)
- French Open: QF (1935)
- Wimbledon: QF (1935, 1937)
- US Open: 4R (1933)

Doubles

Grand Slam doubles results
- Australian Open: W (1935)
- French Open: F (1933, 1934, 1935)

Vivian Erzerum Bede McGrath (17 February 1916 – 9 April 1978) was a tennis champion from Australia. Along with John Bromwich, he was one of the early great players to use a two-handed backhand. His name was pronounced "McGraw".

== Biography ==
He was born in Merrendee, near Mudgee, New South Wales, the fourth child of native Australian parents. His father was a hotelkeeper. He went to Sydney Boys High School, graduating in 1932, where he played tennis and cricket. He began playing tennis against a brick walk at his home.

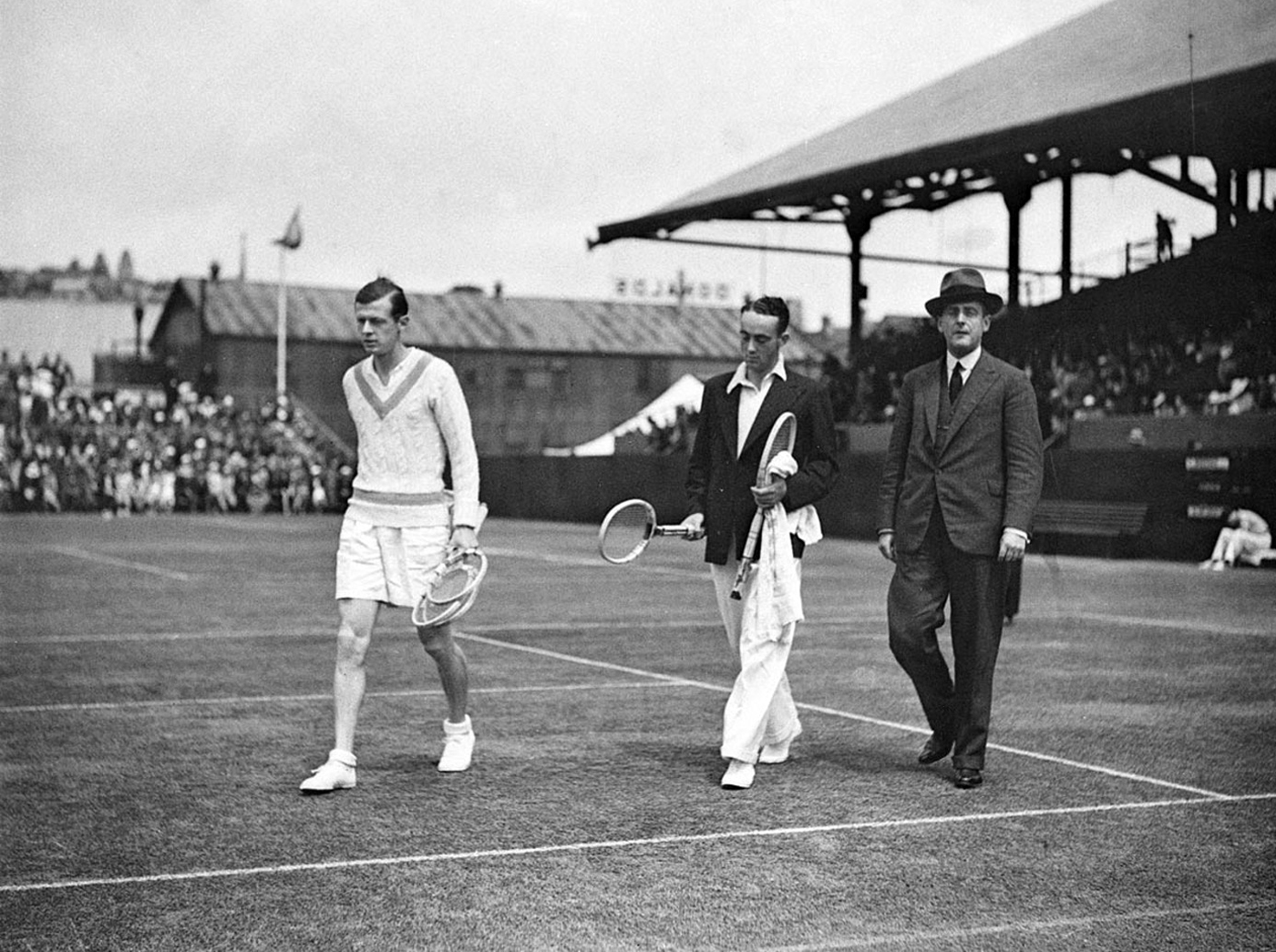
Christian Boussus (left) and Vivian McGrath (center) enter the center court of the White City Stadium in Sydney, Australia in November 1934

He won the Australian junior singles in 1932 and the French junior singles in 1933. He was a member of the Australian Davis Cup team from 1933 to 1937. He won the Australian Open doubles championship with his friend Jack Crawford in 1935. In 1937, he won the Australian Open singles title against John Bromwich. McGrath was ranked World No. 8 in 1935 by A. Wallis Myers of The Daily Telegraph.

World War II interrupted his career, and he served in the Air Force. He was granted leave to play exhibition games against American servicemen.

After the war, he never regained his form and was plagued by injuries. He eventually became a coach in the southern highlands and pursued his interest in horse racing. He died in Burradoo, New South Wales of heart disease.

== Grand Slam finals ==
=== Singles: (1 title) ===
Result	Year	Championship	Surface	Opponent	Score
Win	1937	Australian Championships	Grass	(Australia) John Bromwich	6–3, 1–6, 6–0, 2–6, 6–1

=== Doubles: (1 title, 5 runners-up) ===
Result	Year	Championship	Surface	Partner	Opponents	Score
Loss	1933	French Championships	Clay	(Australia) Adrian Quist	(United Kingdom) Pat Hughes (United Kingdom) Fred Perry	2–6, 4–6, 6–2, 5–7
Loss	1934	French Championships	Clay	(Australia) Jack Crawford	(France) Jean Borotra (France) Jacques Brugnon	9–11, 3–6, 6–2, 6–4, 7–9
Win	1935	Australian Championships	Grass	(Australia) Jack Crawford	(United Kingdom) Pat Hughes (United Kingdom) Fred Perry	6–4, 8–6, 6–2
Loss	1935	French Championships	Clay	(Australia) Donald Turnbull	(Australia) Jack Crawford (Australia) Adrian Quist	1–6, 4–6, 2–6
Loss	1936	Australian Championships	Grass	(Australia) Jack Crawford	(Australia) Adrian Quist (Australia) Donald Turnbull	8–6, 2–6, 1–6, 6–3, 2–6
Loss	1940	Australian Championships	Grass	(Australia) Jack Crawford	(Australia) John Bromwich (Australia) Adrian Quist	3–5, 5–7, 1–6
