= Don Turnbull (tennis) =

Australian tennis player

- Country (sports): Australia
- Born: 28 May 1909; Cottesloe, Western Australia
- Died: 30 January 1994 (aged 84)

Singles

Grand Slam singles results
- Australian Open: SF (1931)
- French Open: 4R (1935)
- Wimbledon: 3R (1933, 1934)
- US Open: 3R (1933)

Doubles

Grand Slam doubles results
- Australian Open: W (1936, 1937)
- French Open: F (1935)
- Wimbledon: QF (1934)

Mixed doubles

Grand Slam mixed doubles results
- Australian Open: F (1937)
- Wimbledon: QF (1935)

Donald Paterson Turnbull (28 May 1909 – 30 January 1994) was an Australian professional tennis player. He won the men's doubles title at the Australian Championships twice, in 1936 and 1937. Turnbull represented Australia in three Davis Cup ties, including the 1933 Europe Zone final against Great Britain. Turnbull beat defending champion Edgar Moon at the 1931 Australian Championships. Turnbull's forehand was in fine form and Moon made the mistake of not targeting Turnbull's weaker backhand. Turnbull came from 2–0 down in the fifth set to win. Turnbull lost in the semifinals to Jack Crawford in straight sets.

== Grand Slam finals ==
=== Doubles (2 titles, 3 runner-ups) ===
Result	Year	Championship	Surface	Partner	Opponents	Score
Loss	1934	Australian Championships	Grass	(Australia) Adrian Quist	(United Kingdom) Pat Hughes (United Kingdom) Fred Perry	8–6, 3–6, 4–6, 6–3, 3–6
Loss	1935	French Championships	Clay	(Australia) Vivian McGrath	(Australia) Jack Crawford (Australia) Adrian Quist	1–6, 4–6, 2–6
Win	1936	Australian Championships	Grass	(Australia) Adrian Quist	(Australia) Jack Crawford (Australia) Vivian McGrath	6–8, 6–2, 6–1, 3–6, 6–2
Win	1937	Australian Championships	Grass	(Australia) Adrian Quist	(Australia) John Bromwich (Australia) Jack Harper	6–2, 9–7, 1–6, 6–8, 6–4
Loss	1939	Australian Championships	Grass	(Australia) Colin Long	(Australia) John Bromwich (Australia) Adrian Quist	4–6, 5–7, 2–6

=== Mixed doubles (1 runner-up) ===
Result	Year	Championship	Surface	Partner	Opponents	Score
Loss	1937	Australian Championships	Grass	(Australia) Dorothy Stevenson	(Australia) Harry Hopman (Australia) Nell Hall Hopman	6–3, 3–6, 2–6
