= 1939 in tennis =

This page covers all the important events in the sport of tennis in 1939. It provides the results of notable tournaments throughout the year on both the men's and women's ILTF tennis circuits.

== Australian Open ==
Category	Champion(s)	Finalist(s)	Score
Men's singles	(Australia) John Bromwich	(Australia) Adrian Quist	6–4, 6–1, 6–3
Women's singles	(Australia) Emily Hood Westacott	(Australia) Nell Hall Hopman	6–1, 6–2
Men's doubles	(Australia) John Bromwich (Australia) Adrian Quist	(Australia) Colin Long (Australia) Don Turnbull	6–4, 7–5, 6–2
Women's doubles	(Australia) Thelma Coyne (Australia) Nancye Wynne	(Australia) May Hardcastle (Australia) Emily Hood Westacott	7–5, 6–4
Mixed doubles	(Australia) Nell Hall Hopman (Australia) Harry Hopman	(Australia) Margaret Wilson (Australia) John Bromwich	6–8, 6–3, 6–2

== French Open ==
Category	Champion(s)	Finalist(s)	Score
Men's singles	(United States) Don McNeill	(United States) Bobby Riggs	7–5, 6–0, 6–3
Women's singles	(France) Simonne Mathieu	(Poland) Jadwiga Jędrzejowska	6–3, 8–6
Men's doubles	(United States) Don McNeill (United States) Charles Harris	(France) Jean Borotra (France) Jacques Brugnon	4–6, 6–4, 6–0, 2–6, 10–8
Women's doubles	(France) Simonne Mathieu (Poland) Jadwiga Jędrzejowska	(Kingdom of Yugoslavia) Alice Florian (Kingdom of Yugoslavia) Hella Kovac	7–5, 7–5
Mixed doubles	(United States) Sarah Palfrey (United States) Elwood Cooke	(France) Simonne Mathieu (Kingdom of Yugoslavia) Franjo Kukuljević	4–6, 6–1, 7–5

== Wimbledon ==
Category	Champion(s)	Finalist(s)	Score
Men's singles	(United States) Bobby Riggs	(United States) Elwood Cooke	2–6, 8–6, 3–6, 6–3, 6–2
Women's singles	(United States) Alice Marble	(United Kingdom) Kay Stammers	6–2, 6–0
Men's doubles	(United States) Elwood Cooke (United States) Bobby Riggs	(United Kingdom) Charles Hare (United Kingdom) Frank Wilde	6–3, 3–6, 6–3, 9–7
Women's doubles	(United States) Sarah Fabyan (United States) Alice Marble	(United States) Helen Jacobs (United Kingdom) Billie Yorke	6–1, 6–0
Mixed doubles	(United States) Bobby Riggs (United States) Alice Marble	(United Kingdom) Frank Wilde (United Kingdom) Nina Brown	9–7, 6–1

== US Open ==
Category	Champion(s)	Finalist(s)	Score
Men's singles	(United States) Bobby Riggs	(United States) Welby van Horn	6–4, 6–2, 6–4
Women's singles	(United States) Alice Marble	(United States) Helen Jacobs	6–0, 8–10, 6–4
Men's doubles	(Australia) Adrian Quist (Australia) John Bromwich	(Australia) Jack Crawford (Australia) Harry Hopman	8–6, 6–1, 6–4
Women's doubles	(United States) Sarah Palfrey (United States) Alice Marble	(United Kingdom) Kay Stammers (United Kingdom) Freda James Hammersley	7–5, 8–6
Mixed doubles	(United States) Alice Marble (Australia) Harry Hopman	(United States) Sarah Palfrey (United States) Elwood Cooke	9–7, 6–1
