= 1939 Australian Championships – Mixed doubles =

Mixed doubles
- 1939 Australian Championships

Final
- Champions: (Australia) Nell Hopman (Australia) Harry Hopman
- Runners-up: (Australia) Margaret Wilson (Australia) John Bromwich
- Score: 6–8, 6–2, 6–3

Details
- Draw: 16
- Seeds: 4

Events
Singles	men	women		boys	girls
Doubles	men	women	mixed	boys	girls
- Australian Championships

Nell Hopman and Harry Hopman recorded their fourth and last mixed doubles victory by defeating the defending champions Margaret Wilson and John Bromwich 6–8, 6–2, 6–3, to win the mixed doubles tennis title at the 1939 Australian Championships.

== Seeds ==
1. (Australia) Margaret Wilson / (Australia) John Bromwich (final)
2. (Australia) Nell Hopman / (Australia) Harry Hopman (champions)
3. (Australia) Thelma Coyne / (Australia) Len Schwartz (first round)
4. (Australia) Nancye Wynne / (Australia) Colin Long (semifinals)

== Draw ==
Key

- Q = Qualifier
- WC = Wild card
- LL = Lucky loser
- Alt = Alternate
- ITF = ITF entry
- PR = Protected ranking
- SR = Special ranking
- SE = Special exempt
- JE = Junior exempt
- JR = Junior Accelerator Programme entrant
- CO = College Accelerator Programme entrant
- NG = Next Gen Accelerator Program entrant
- w/o = Walkover
- r = Retired
- d = Defaulted

First round
1	(Australia) Margaret Wilson (Australia) John Bromwich	6	6
(Australia) May Hardcastle (Australia) Max Bonner	4	2
(Australia) May Blick (Australia) George Holland	2	6	8
(Australia) Gwen O'Halloran (Australia) Les Hancock	6	4	6
4	(Australia) Nancye Wynne (Australia) Colin Long	6	5	6
(Australia) Joan Hartigan (Australia) Bert Tonkin	2	7	2
(Australia) Sadie Berryman (Australia) Gar Moon	6	6
(Australia) Birdie Bond (Australia) Norman Wasley	2	4
(Australia) Nancy Chitty (Australia) Lionel Brodie	2	6	9
3	(Australia) Thelma Coyne (Australia) Len Schwartz	6	3	7
(Australia) Emily Hood Westacott (Australia) Jim Gilchrist	6	6
(United States) Edith Tough (Australia) Vivian McGrath	4	2
2	(Australia) Nell Hopman (Australia) Harry Hopman	6	6
(Australia) Edie Niemeyer (Australia) George Wilkinson	2	3
(Australia) Dot Stevenson (Australia) Don Turnbull	6	6
(Australia) Thora Geddes (Australia) Jack Clemenger	4	4

Quarterfinals
1	(Australia) Margaret Wilson (Australia) John Bromwich	6	7
(Australia) May Blick (Australia) George Holland	4	5
4	(Australia) Nancye Wynne (Australia) Colin Long	6	7	6
(Australia) Sadie Berryman (Australia) Gar Moon	4	9	2
(Australia) Nancy Chitty (Australia) Lionel Brodie	2	2
(Australia) Emily Hood Westacott (Australia) Jim Gilchrist	6	6
2	(Australia) Nell Hopman (Australia) Harry Hopman	7	6
(Australia) Dot Stevenson (Australia) Don Turnbull	5	4

Semifinals
1	(Australia) Margaret Wilson (Australia) John Bromwich	6	0	7
4	(Australia) Nancye Wynne (Australia) Colin Long	4	6	5
(Australia) Emily Hood Westacott (Australia) Jim Gilchrist	1	6	1
2	(Australia) Nell Hopman (Australia) Harry Hopman	6	3	6

Final
1	(Australia) Margaret Wilson (Australia) John Bromwich	8	2	3
2	(Australia) Nell Hopman (Australia) Harry Hopman	6	6	6
