= List of Australian Open women's singles champions =

Australian Open women's singles champions
- Location: Melbourne; Australia
- Venue: Melbourne Park
- Governing body: Tennis Australia
- Created: 1922 (established)
- Editions: 100 events (2026); 58 events (Open Era)
- Surface: Grass (1922–1987); Rebound Ace (1988–2007); Plexicushion (2008–present)
- Prize money: A$ 3,500,000 (2025)
- Trophy: Daphne Akhurst Memorial Cup
- Website: Australian Open

Most titles
- Amateur era: 7: Margaret Court
- Open era: 7: Serena Williams

Most consecutive titles
- Amateur era: 7: Margaret Court
- Open era: 3: Margaret Court; 3: Evonne Goolagong; 3: Steffi Graf; 3: Monica Seles; 3: Martina Hingis

Current champion
- Elena Rybakina

The Australian Open (Note: Known as the Australasian Championships (1905–1926) and as the Australian Championships (1927–1968) during the Amateur Era.) (Note: The tournament entered the Open Era with the 1969 edition, allowing professional players to compete alongside amateurs.) is an annual tennis tournament created in 1905 and played on outdoor hard courts (Note: Since 1988, Rod Laver Arena features a retractable roof and lights, allowing indoor and night-time play.) (Note: The Australian Open specifically uses Plexicushion Prestige hardcourts, categorized as a "Medium" speed surface by the International Tennis Federation (ITF).) at Melbourne Park in Melbourne, Australia.

The women's singles was first contested in 1922 along with the women's and mixed doubles competition as the last three events to be added in the amateur era. The Australian Open is played during two weeks mid-January, and has been chronologically the first of the four Grand Slam tournaments of the tennis season since 1987. The event was not held from 1940 to 1945 because of World War II, and 1986 because Tennis Australia wanted to move the tournament start from mid-December 1986 to mid-January 1987. Margaret Court holds the all-time record for singles titles at this tournament with 11; 7 in the Amateur Era and 4 in the Open Era. Serena Williams holds the Open Era record with 7 singles titles.

== History ==
Perth, Brisbane, Adelaide, Sydney, and Melbourne, Australia have all held the event. The competition switched locations every year before it settled in 1972 at the Kooyong Stadium, moving to Flinders Park, now Melbourne Park, in 1988. Several calendar changes took place for the Australian Open, from January to December in 1972 to bypass the January-to-June International Lawn Tennis Federation (ITLF) ban of World Championship Tennis (WCT) players; from late to early December in 1977 to avoid the Christmas holidays, which resulted in having two Opens in the season; and back to January, when the planned December 1986 edition was moved to early 1987, leaving no Open for the 1986 season.

An all British and an all American final were contested in 1935 and 1979 respectively, but otherwise every other final contested until 1980 featured an Australian player.

The women's singles' rules have undergone several changes, since the first edition. This event has been contested in a knockout format, and all matches played at the best-of-three sets. Since 1922, all sets have been decided in the advantage format, with six games and two games difference. The lingering death best-of-twelve points tie-break was introduced in 1971, and used for the first two sets since then, except from 1980 to 1982, when the tie-break was also played in final sets.

The court surface changed once, from grass (1922–1987) to hard courts, since the move to Flinders Park in 1988. No tennis player has won this event on both grass and Rebound Ace; Serena Williams is the only player to win the tournament on two different surfaces, winning her first three titles on Rebound Ace and her last four on Plexicushion.

The champion receives a miniature replica of the Daphne Akhurst Memorial Cup, named after the five-time champion, which was first awarded to the champion in 1934. In 2010, the winner received prize money of A$2,100,000.

In the Australasian Championship, Margaret Molesworth (1922–1923) and Daphne Akhurst (1925–1926) co-hold the records for most wins and most consecutive wins.

In the Australian Championships, Margaret Court (1960–1966) holds the records for most titles with seven wins, and most consecutive titles with seven from (1960–1966).

In the Australian Open, Serena Williams (2003, 2005, 2007, 2009–2010, 2015, 2017) has the most victories, with seven. The record for most consecutive titles is three held by the following players: Margaret Court (1969–1971), Evonne Goolagong (1974–1976), Steffi Graf (1988–1990), Monica Seles (1991–1993), Martina Hingis (1997–1999).

Overall in the Championship's history, Margaret Court (1960–1973) holds the records for most titles with eleven wins, and most consecutive titles with seven from (1960–1966).

This event has been won in straight sets during the Open Era of tennis by the following players: Margaret Court in 1969, 1970 and 1973, Virginia Wade in 1972, Kerry Melville Reid in 1977 January, Evonne Goolagong in 1975, 1976 and 1977 December, Chris O'Neil in 1978, Barbara Jordan in 1979, Hana Mandlíková in 1980 and 1987, Martina Navratilova in 1983, Steffi Graf in 1988, 1989 and 1994, Monica Seles in 1992 and 1996, Mary Pierce in 1995, Martina Hingis in 1997, 1998 and 1999, Lindsay Davenport in 2000, Jennifer Capriati in 2001, Amélie Mauresmo in 2006, Maria Sharapova in 2008, Victoria Azarenka in 2012, Li Na in 2014 and Serena Williams in 2007, 2009, 2015 and 2017.

== Finals ==
=== Australasian Championships ===
Year (Note: Each year is linked to an article about that particular event's draw.)	Country	Champion	Country	Runner-up	Score in the final
1922	AUS	Margaret Molesworth (1/2)	AUS	Esna Boyd	6–3, 10–8
1923	AUS	Margaret Molesworth (2/2)	AUS	Esna Boyd	6–1, 7–5
1924	AUS	Sylvia Lance Harper	AUS	Esna Boyd	6–3, 3–6, 8–6
1925	AUS	Daphne Akhurst (1/5)	AUS	Esna Boyd	1–6, 8–6, 6–4
1926	AUS	Daphne Akhurst (2/5)	AUS	Esna Boyd	6–1, 6–3

=== Australian Championships ===
Year	Country	Champion	Country	Runner-up	Score in the final
1927	AUS	Esna Boyd	AUS	Sylvia Lance Harper	5–7, 6–1, 6–2
1928	AUS	Daphne Akhurst (3/5)	AUS	Esna Boyd	7–5, 6–2
1929	AUS	Daphne Akhurst (4/5)	AUS	Louie Bickerton	6–1, 5–7, 6–2
1930	AUS	Daphne Akhurst (5/5)	AUS	Sylvia Lance Harper	10–8, 2–6, 7–5
1931	AUS	Coral Buttsworth (1/2)	AUS	Marjorie Cox Crawford	1–6, 6–3, 6–4
1932	AUS	Coral Buttsworth (2/2)	AUS	Kathleen Le Messurier	9–7, 6–4
1933	AUS	Joan Hartigan (1/3)	AUS	Coral Buttsworth	6–4, 6–3
1934	AUS	Joan Hartigan (2/3)	AUS	Margaret Molesworth	6–1, 6–4
1935	GBR (Note: Three wins by players from the United Kingdom of Great Britain and Northern Ireland (1922–present).)	Dorothy Round	GBR	Nancy Lyle	1–6, 6–1, 6–3
1936	AUS	Joan Hartigan (3/3)	AUS	Nancye Wynne Bolton	6–4, 6–4
1937	AUS	Nancye Wynne Bolton (1/6)	AUS	Emily Hood Westacott	6–3, 5–7, 6–4
1938	USA	Dorothy Cheney	AUS	Dorothy Stevenson	6–3, 6–2
1939	AUS	Emily Hood Westacott	AUS	Nell Hall Hopman	6–1, 6–2
1940	AUS	Nancye Wynne Bolton (2/6)	AUS	Thelma Coyne Long	5–7, 6–4, 6–0
1941	No competition (due to World War II) (Note: The tournament was not held from 1941 to 1945 because of World War II.)				
1942	No competition (due to World War II)				
1943	No competition (due to World War II)				
1944	No competition (due to World War II)				
1945	No competition (due to World War II)				
1946	AUS	Nancye Wynne Bolton (3/6)	AUS	Joyce Fitch	6–4, 6–4
1947	AUS	Nancye Wynne Bolton (4/6)	AUS	Nell Hall Hopman	6–3, 6–2
1948	AUS	Nancye Wynne Bolton (5/6)	AUS	Marie Toomey	6–3, 6–1
1949	USA	Doris Hart	AUS	Nancye Wynne Bolton	6–3, 6–4
1950	USA	Louise Brough	USA	Doris Hart	6–4, 3–6, 6–4
1951	AUS	Nancye Wynne Bolton (6/6)	AUS	Thelma Coyne Long	6–1, 7–5
1952	AUS	Thelma Coyne Long (1/2)	AUS	Helen Angwin	6–2, 6–3
1953	USA	Maureen Connolly	USA	Julia Sampson Hayward	6–3, 6–2
1954	AUS	Thelma Coyne Long (2/2)	AUS	Jenny Staley	6–3, 6–4
1955	AUS	Beryl Penrose	AUS	Thelma Coyne Long	6–4, 6–3
1956	AUS	Mary Carter Reitano (1/2)	AUS	Thelma Coyne Long	3–6, 6–2, 9–7
1957	USA	Shirley Fry Irvin	USA	Althea Gibson	6–3, 6–4
1958	GBR	Angela Mortimer	AUS	Lorraine Coghlan	6–3, 6–4
1959	AUS	Mary Carter Reitano (2/2)	RSA	Renée Schuurman	6–2, 6–3
1960	AUS	Margaret Smith (1/11)	AUS	Jan Lehane	7–5, 6–2
1961	AUS	Margaret Smith (2/11)	AUS	Jan Lehane	6–1, 6–4
1962	AUS	Margaret Smith (3/11)	AUS	Jan Lehane	6–0, 6–2
1963	AUS	Margaret Smith (4/11)	AUS	Jan Lehane	6–2, 6–2
1964	AUS	Margaret Smith (5/11)	AUS	Lesley Turner Bowrey	6–3, 6–2
1965	AUS	Margaret Smith (6/11)	BRA	Maria Bueno	5–7, 6–4, 5–2, retired
1966	AUS	Margaret Smith (7/11)	USA	Nancy Richey	walkover
1967	USA	Nancy Richey	AUS	Lesley Turner Bowrey	6–1, 6–4
1968	USA	Billie Jean King	AUS	Margaret Court	6–1, 6–2

=== Australian Open ===
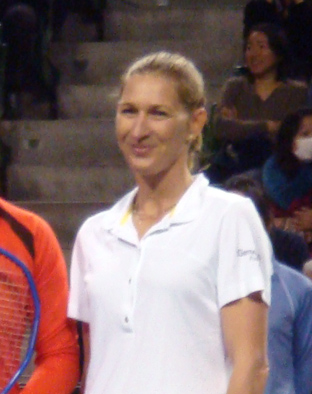
Steffi Graf is a four-time champion and won three times consecutively

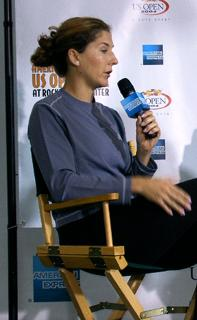
Monica Seles is a four-time champion and won three times consecutively

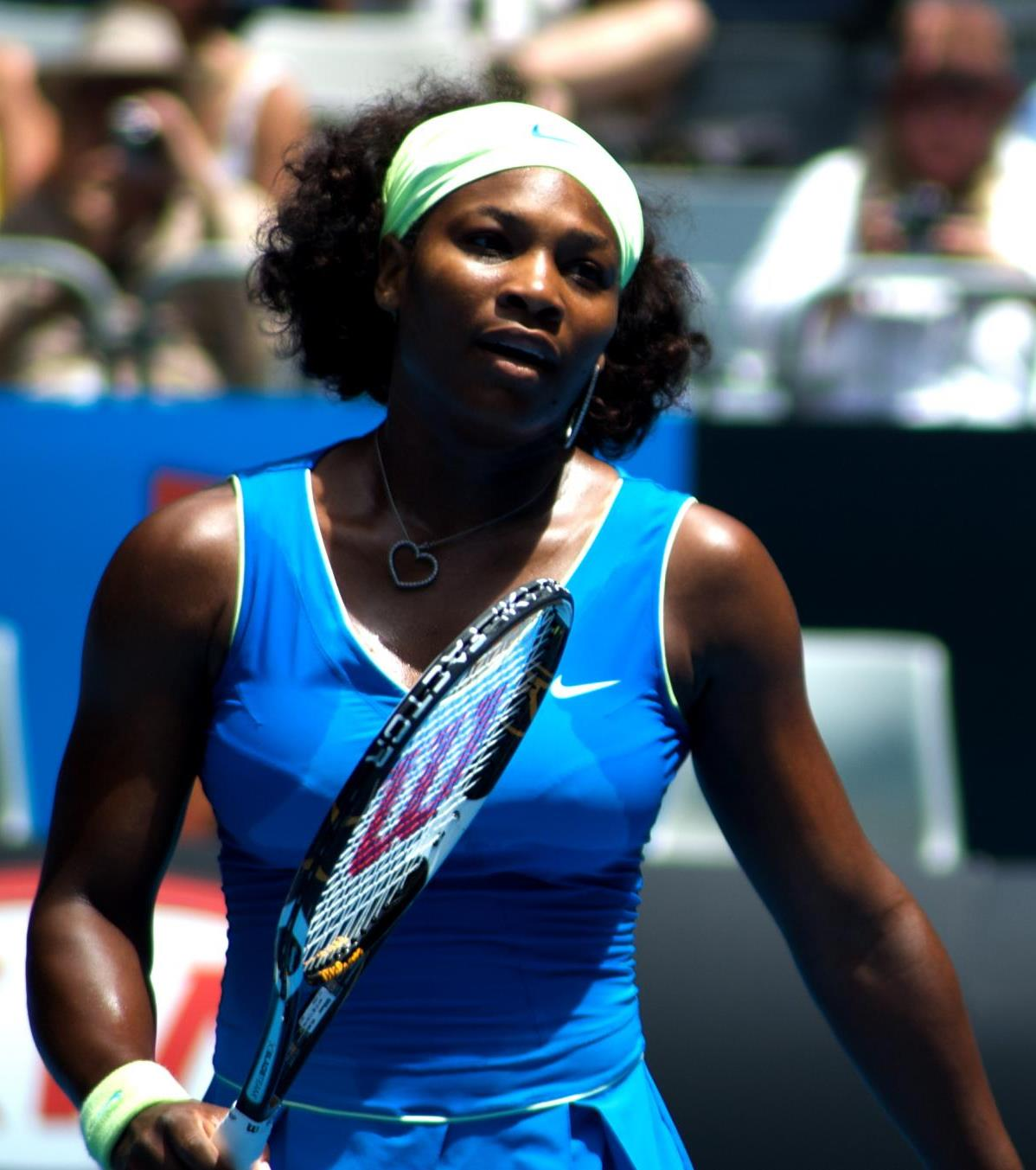
American Serena Williams is a seven-time champion, which is an Open Era record.

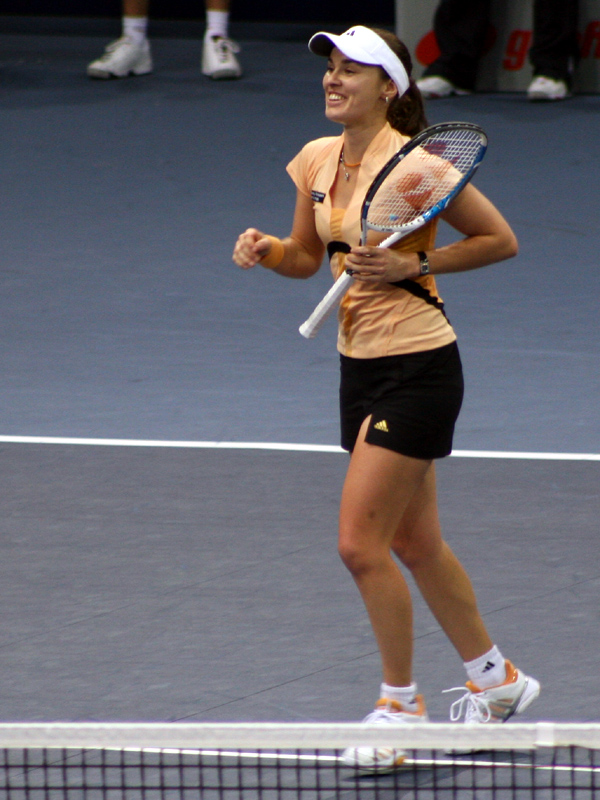
Martina Hingis is a three-time consecutive champion, and she reached the final six times consecutively, which is an open era record.

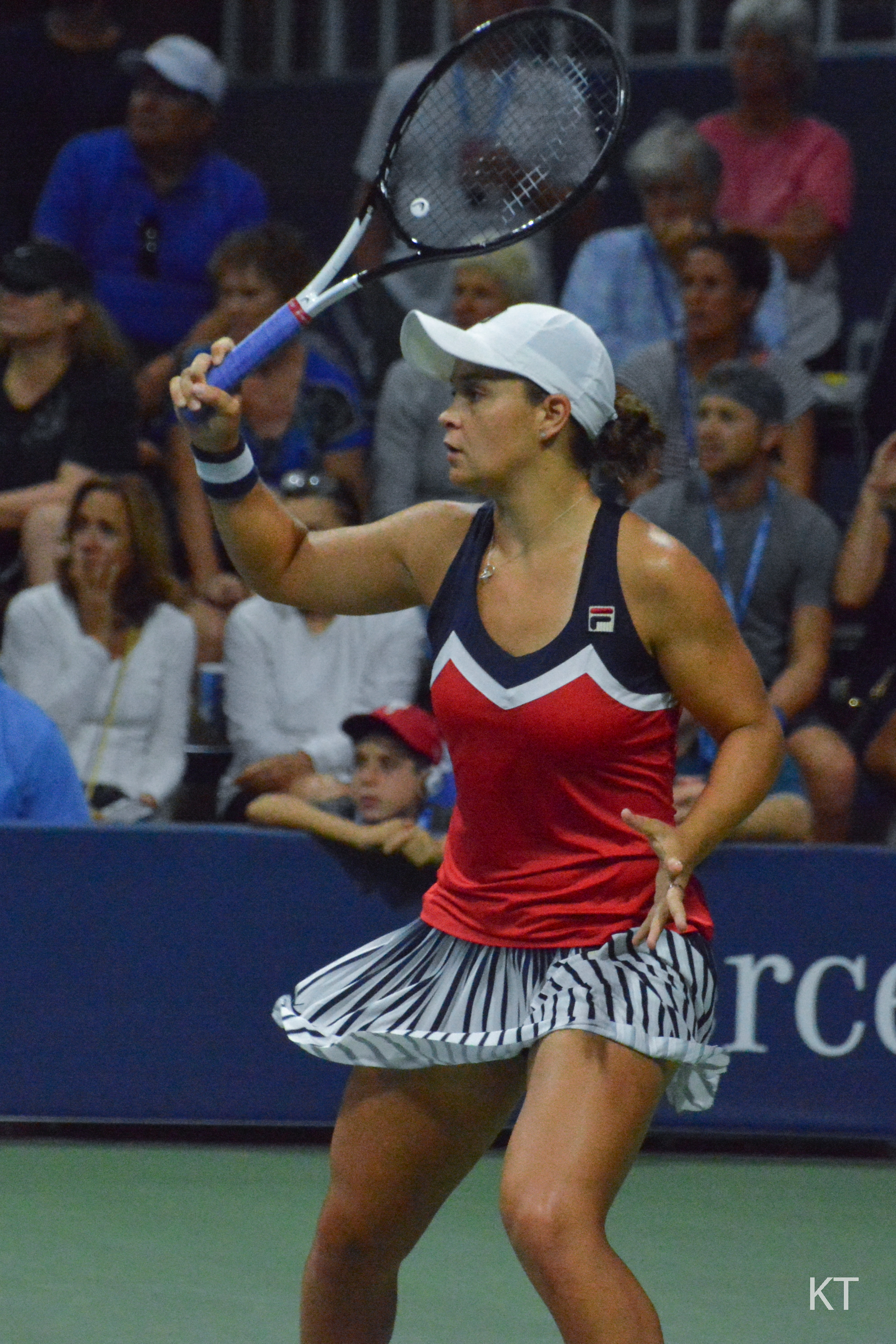
Ashleigh Barty won the title in 2022, becoming the first Australian woman to win the title in 44 years.

Year	Country	Champion	Country	Runner-up	Score in the final
1969	AUS	Margaret Court (8/11)	USA	Billie Jean King	6–4, 6–1
1970	AUS	Margaret Court (9/11)	AUS	Kerry Melville	6–1, 6–3
1971	AUS	Margaret Court (10/11)	AUS	Evonne Goolagong	2–6, 7–6^{(7–0)}, 7–5
1972	GBR	Virginia Wade	AUS	Evonne Goolagong	6–4, 6–4
1973	AUS	Margaret Court (11/11)	AUS	Evonne Goolagong	6–4, 7–5
1974	AUS	Evonne Goolagong (1/4)	USA	Chris Evert	7–6^{(7–5)}, 4–6, 6–0
1975	AUS	Evonne Goolagong (2/4)	TCH (Note: Czechoslovakia (TCH, 1918–1992), does not include the totals of Czech Republic (CZE, 1993–present) and Slovakia (SVK, 1993–present).)	Martina Navratilova (Note: Martina Navratilova was born in Czechoslovakia, but competed as an American after the US Open in 1975, having sought asylum in the United States, which made her relinquish her Czechoslovak citizenship.)	6–3, 6–2
1976	AUS	Evonne Goolagong (3/4)	TCH	Renáta Tomanová	6–2, 6–2
1977 (1) (Note: Two Australian Opens were in held in 1977 because of a date change, the first in January and the second in December.)	AUS	Kerry Melville Reid	AUS	Dianne Fromholtz	7–5, 6–2
1977 (2)	AUS	Evonne Goolagong (4/4)	AUS	Helen Gourlay	6–3, 6–0
1978	AUS	Chris O'Neil	USA	Betsy Nagelsen	6–3, 7–6^{(7–3)}
1979	USA	Barbara Jordan	USA	Sharon Walsh	6–3, 6–3
1980	TCH	Hana Mandlíková (1/2)	AUS	Wendy Turnbull	6–0, 7–5
1981	USA	Martina Navratilova (1/3)	USA	Chris Evert	6–7^{(7–4)}, 6–4, 7–5
1982	USA	Chris Evert (1/2)	USA	Martina Navratilova	6–3, 2–6, 6–3
1983	USA	Martina Navratilova (2/3)	USA	Kathy Jordan	6–2, 7–6^{(7–5)}
1984	USA	Chris Evert (2/2)	TCH	Helena Suková	6–7^{(4–7)}, 6–1, 6–3
1985	USA	Martina Navratilova (3/3)	USA	Chris Evert	6–2, 4–6, 6–2
1986	No competition (due to date change) (Note: The tournament was not held in 1986 because of a date change. See 1986 Australian Open tournament.)				
1987	TCH	Hana Mandlíková (2/2)	USA	Martina Navratilova	7–5, 7–6^{(7–1)}
1988	FRG (Note: FRG was West Germany, but after unification in 1990 became just Germany (GER).)	Steffi Graf (1/4)	USA	Chris Evert	6–1, 7–6^{(7–3)}
1989	FRG	Steffi Graf (2/4)	TCH	Helena Suková	6–4, 6–4
1990	FRG	Steffi Graf (3/4)	USA	Mary Joe Fernández	6–3, 6–4
1991	YUG (Note: Monica Seles won her first three titles as a Yugoslavian, but the last one was won as an American after gaining citizenship.)	Monica Seles (1/4)	TCH	Jana Novotná	5–7, 6–3, 6–1
1992	YUG	Monica Seles (2/4)	USA	Mary Joe Fernández	6–2, 6–3
1993	YUG	Monica Seles (3/4)	GER	Steffi Graf	4–6, 6–3, 6–2
1994	GER	Steffi Graf (4/4)	ESP	Arantxa Sánchez Vicario	6–0, 6–2
1995	FRA	Mary Pierce	ESP	Arantxa Sánchez Vicario	6–3, 6–2
1996	USA	Monica Seles (4/4)	GER	Anke Huber	6–4, 6–1
1997	SUI	Martina Hingis (1/3)	FRA	Mary Pierce	6–2, 6–2
1998	SUI	Martina Hingis (2/3)	ESP	Conchita Martínez	6–3, 6–3
1999	SUI	Martina Hingis (3/3)	FRA	Amélie Mauresmo	6–2, 6–3
2000	USA	Lindsay Davenport	SUI	Martina Hingis	6–1, 7–5
2001	USA	Jennifer Capriati (1/2)	SUI	Martina Hingis	6–4, 6–3
2002	USA	Jennifer Capriati (2/2)	SUI	Martina Hingis	4–6, 7–6^{(9–7)}, 6–2
2003	USA	Serena Williams (1/7)	USA	Venus Williams	7–6^{(7–4)}, 3–6, 6–4
2004	BEL	Justine Henin	BEL	Kim Clijsters	6–3, 4–6, 6–3
2005	USA	Serena Williams (2/7)	USA	Lindsay Davenport	2–6, 6–3, 6–0
2006	FRA	Amélie Mauresmo	BEL	Justine Henin	6–1, 2–0 retired
2007	USA	Serena Williams (3/7)	RUS	Maria Sharapova	6–1, 6–2
2008	RUS	Maria Sharapova	SRB	Ana Ivanovic	7–5, 6–3
2009	USA	Serena Williams (4/7)	RUS	Dinara Safina	6–0, 6–3
2010	USA	Serena Williams (5/7	BEL	Justine Henin	6–4, 3–6, 6–2
2011	BEL	Kim Clijsters	CHN	Li Na	3–6, 6–3, 6–3
2012	BLR	Victoria Azarenka (1/2)	RUS	Maria Sharapova	6–3, 6–0
2013	BLR	Victoria Azarenka (2/2)	CHN	Li Na	4–6, 6–4, 6–3
2014	CHN	Li Na	SVK	Dominika Cibulková	7–6^{(7–3)}, 6–0
2015	USA	Serena Williams (6/7)	RUS	Maria Sharapova	6–3, 7–6^{(7–5)}
2016	GER	Angelique Kerber	USA	Serena Williams	6–4, 3–6, 6–4
2017	USA	Serena Williams (7/7)	USA	Venus Williams	6–4, 6–4
2018	DEN	Caroline Wozniacki	ROU	Simona Halep	7–6^{(7–2)}, 3–6, 6–4
2019	JPN	Naomi Osaka (1/2)	CZE	Petra Kvitová	7–6^{(7–2)}, 5–7, 6–4
2020	USA	Sofia Kenin	ESP	Garbiñe Muguruza	4–6, 6–2, 6–2
2021	JPN	Naomi Osaka (2/2)	USA	Jennifer Brady	6–4, 6–3
2022	AUS	Ashleigh Barty	USA	Danielle Collins	6–3, 7–6^{(7–2)}
2023	(Note: On 1 March 2022, the WTA announced that players from Belarus will not be allowed to compete under the name or flag of Belarus following the Russian invasion of Ukraine.)	Aryna Sabalenka (1/2)	KAZ	Elena Rybakina	4–6, 6–3, 6–4
2024		Aryna Sabalenka (2/2)	CHN	Zheng Qinwen	6–3, 6–2
2025	USA	Madison Keys		Aryna Sabalenka	6–3, 2–6, 7–5
2026	KAZ	Elena Rybakina		Aryna Sabalenka	6–4, 4–6, 6–4

== Statistics ==
=== Multiple champions ===
Player	Amateur Era	Open Era	All-time	Years
Margaret Smith Court (AUS)	7	4	11	1960, 1961, 1962, 1963, 1964, 1965, 1966, 1969, 1970, 1971, 1973
Serena Williams (USA)	0	7	7	2003, 2005, 2007, 2009, 2010, 2015, 2017
Nancye Wynne Bolton (AUS)	6	0	6	1937, 1940, 1946, 1947, 1948, 1951
Daphne Akhurst Cozens (AUS)	5	0	5	1925, 1926, 1928, 1929, 1930
Evonne Goolagong (AUS)	0	4	4	1974, 1975, 1976, 1977(Dec)
Steffi Graf (GER)	0	4	4	1988, 1989, 1990, 1994
(Socialist Federal Republic of Yugoslavia) (Federal Republic of Yugoslavia) (United States) Monica Seles (YUG / FRY / USA)	0	4	4	1991, 1992, 1993, 1996
Joan Hartigan Bathurst (AUS)	3	0	3	1933, 1934, 1936
Martina Hingis (SUI)	0	3	3	1997, 1998, 1999
Martina Navratilova (USA)	0	3	3	1981, 1983, 1985
Victoria Azarenka (BLR)	0	2	2	2012, 2013
Coral Buttsworth (AUS)	2	0	2	1931, 1932
Jennifer Capriati (USA)	0	2	2	2001, 2002
Chris Evert (USA)	0	2	2	1982, 1984
Thelma Coyne Long (AUS)	2	0	2	1952, 1954
Hana Mandlíková (CZE)	0	2	2	1980, 1987
Margaret Molesworth (AUS)	2	0	2	1922, 1923
Naomi Osaka (JPN)	0	2	2	2019, 2021
Mary Carter Reitano (AUS)	2	0	2	1956, 1959
Aryna Sabalenka (Note: Aryna Sabalenka is from Belarus and won in 2023 and 2024, but was competing as a neutral competitor in both years because on 1 March 2022, the WTA announced that players from Belarus will not be allowed to compete under the name or flag of Belarus following the 2022 Russian invasion of Ukraine.)	0	2	2	2023, 2024

=== Champions by country ===
Country	Amateur Era	Open Era	All-time	First title	Last title
Australia (AUS)	33	11	44	1922	2022
United States (USA)	7	19	26	1938	2025
Germany (GER)	0	5	5	1988	2016
Great Britain (GBR)	2	1	3	1935	1972
Yugoslavia (YUG); Yugoslavia (FRY) (Note: Two wins as Yugoslavia (YUG, 1918–1992), one win as FR Yugoslavia (FRY, 1992–2006))	0	3	3	1991	1993
Switzerland (SUI)	0	3	3	1997	1999
Belarus (BLR)	0	2	2	2012	2013
Belgium (BEL)	0	2	2	2004	2011
Czechoslovakia (TCH)	0	2	2	1980	1987
France (FRA)	0	2	2	1995	2006
Japan (JPN)	0	2	2	2019	2021
China (CHN)	0	1	1	2014	2014
Denmark (DEN)	0	1	1	2018	2018
Russia (RUS)	0	1	1	2008	2008
Kazakhstan (KAZ)	0	1	1	2026	2026

== See also ==
Australian Open other competitions

- List of Australian Open men's singles champions
- List of Australian Open men's doubles champions
- List of Australian Open women's doubles champions
- List of Australian Open mixed doubles champions

Grand Slam women's singles

- List of French Open women's singles champions
- List of Wimbledon ladies' singles champions
- List of US Open women's singles champions
- List of Grand Slam women's singles champions
