= List of Australian Open women's doubles champions =

This is a list of all the champions of the women's doubles event for the Australian Open.

== Champions ==
=== Australasian Championships ===
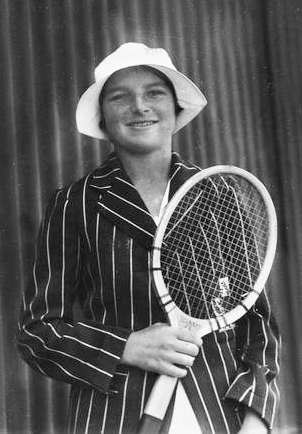
Thelma Coyne Long won 12 doubles titles at the Australian Championships.

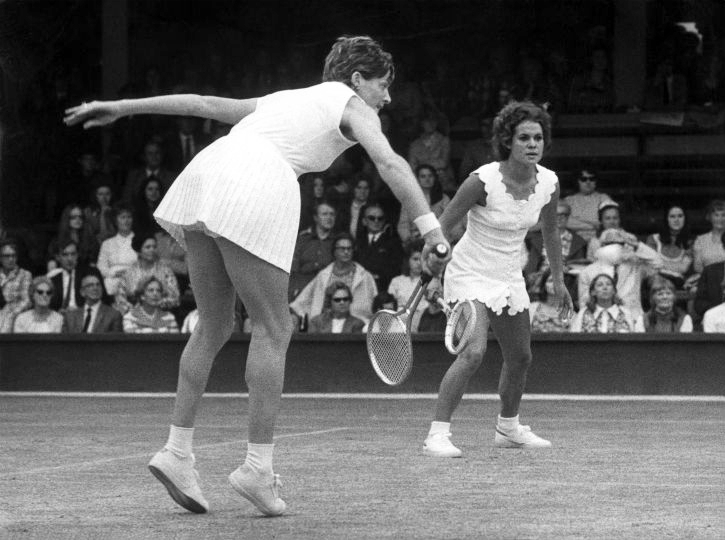
Margaret Court competed in 13 women's doubles finals and won eight titles

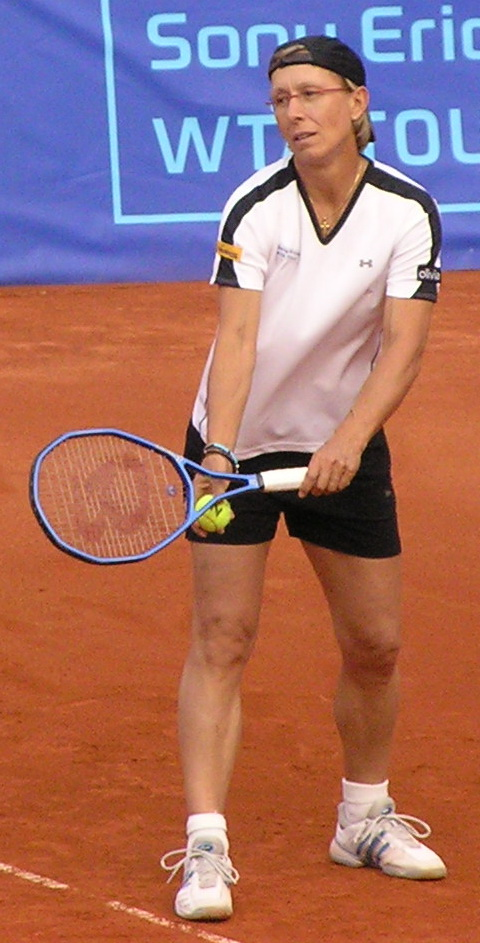
Martina Navratilova won the title eight times, seven of those together with Pam Shriver

Year	Champions	Runners-up	Score
1922	(Australia) Esna Boyd Robertson (Australia) Marjorie Mountain	(Australia) Floris St. George (Australia) Gwen Utz	1–6, 6–4, 7–5
1923	(Australia) Esna Boyd Robertson (Australia) Sylvia Lance Harper	(Australia) Mall Molesworth (Australia) Beryl Turner	6–1, 6–4
1924	(Australia) Daphne Akhurst Cozens (Australia) Sylvia Lance Harper	(Australia) Kathleen Le Messurier (Australia) Meryl O'Hara Wood	7–5, 6–2
1925	(Australia) Daphne Akhurst Cozens (Australia) Sylvia Lance Harper	(Australia) Esna Boyd Robertson (Australia) Kathleen Le Messurier	6–4, 6–3
1926	(Australia) Esna Boyd Robertson (Australia) Meryl O'Hara Wood	(Australia) Daphne Akhurst Cozens (Australia) Marjorie Cox Crawford	6–3, 6–8, 8–6

=== Australian Championships ===
Year	Champions	Runners-up	Score
1927	(Australia) Louie Bickerton (Australia) Meryl O'Hara Wood	(Australia) Esna Boyd Robertson (Australia) Sylvia Lance Harper	6–3, 6–3
1928	(Australia) Daphne Akhurst Cozens (Australia) Esna Boyd Robertson	(Australia) Kathleen Le Messurier (Australia) Dorothy Weston	6–3, 6–1
1929	(Australia) Daphne Akhurst Cozens (Australia) Louie Bickerton	(Australia) Sylvia Lance Harper (Australia) Meryl O'Hara Wood	6–2, 3–6, 6–2
1930	(Australia) Mall Molesworth (Australia) Emily Hood Westacott	(Australia) Marjorie Cox Crawford (Australia) Sylvia Lance Harper	6–3, 0–6, 7–5
1931	(Australia) Louie Bickerton (Australia) Daphne Akhurst Cozens	(Australia) Nell Lloyd (Australia) Gwen Utz	6–0, 6–4
1932	(Australia) Coral McInnes Buttsworth (Australia) Marjorie Cox Crawford	(Australia) Kathleen Le Messurier (Australia) Dorothy Weston	6–2, 6–2
1933	(Australia) Mall Molesworth (Australia) Emily Hood Westacott	(Australia) Joan Hartigan (United States) Marjorie Gladman Van Ryn	6–3, 6–3
1934	(Australia) Mall Molesworth (Australia) Emily Hood Westacott	(Australia) Joan Hartigan (Australia) Ula Valkenburg	6–8, 6–4, 6–4
1935	(United Kingdom) Evelyn Dearman (United Kingdom) Nancy Lyle	(Australia) Louie Bickerton (Australia) Nell Hall Hopman	6–3, 6–4
1936	(Australia) Thelma Coyne Long (Australia) Nancye Wynne Bolton	(Australia) May Blick (Australia) Katherine Woodward	6–2, 6–4
1937	(Australia) Thelma Coyne Long (Australia) Nancye Wynne Bolton	(Australia) Nell Hall Hopman (Australia) Emily Hood Westacott	6–2, 6–2
1938	(Australia) Thelma Coyne Long (Australia) Nancye Wynne Bolton	(United States) Dorothy Bundy Cheney (Australia) Dorothy Workman	9–7, 6–4
1939	(Australia) Thelma Coyne Long (Australia) Nancye Wynne Bolton	(Australia) May Hardcastle (Australia) Emily Hood Westacott	7–5, 6–4
1940	(Australia) Thelma Coyne Long (Australia) Nancye Wynne Bolton	(Australia) Joan Hartigan (Australia) Edith Niemeyer	7–5, 6–2
1941	No competition (due to World War II) (Note: The tournament was not held from 1941 to 1945 because of World War II.)		
1942	No competition (due to World War II)		
1943	No competition (due to World War II)		
1944	No competition (due to World War II)		
1945	No competition (due to World War II)		
1946	(Australia) Joyce Fitch (Australia) Mary Bevis Hawton	(Australia) Nancye Wynne Bolton (Australia) Thelma Coyne Long	9–7, 6–4
1947	(Australia) Thelma Coyne Long (Australia) Nancye Wynne Bolton	(Australia) Mary Bevis Hawton (Australia) Joyce Fitch	6–3, 6–3
1948	(Australia) Thelma Coyne Long (Australia) Nancye Wynne Bolton	(Australia) Mary Bevis Hawton (Australia) Pat Jones	6–3, 6–3
1949	(Australia) Thelma Coyne Long (Australia) Nancye Wynne Bolton	(United States) Doris Hart (Australia) Marie Toomey	6–0, 6–1
1950	(United States) Louise Brough Clapp (United States) Doris Hart	(Australia) Nancye Wynne Bolton (Australia) Thelma Coyne Long	6–2, 2–6, 6–3
1951	(Australia) Thelma Coyne Long (Australia) Nancye Wynne Bolton	(Australia) Joyce Fitch (Australia) Mary Bevis Hawton	6–2, 6–1
1952	(Australia) Thelma Coyne Long (Australia) Nancye Wynne Bolton	(Australia) Alison Burton Baker (Australia) Mary Bevis Hawton	6–1, 6–1
1953	(United States) Maureen Connolly (United States) Julia Sampson	(Australia) Mary Bevis Hawton (Australia) Beryl Penrose	6–4, 6–2
1954	(Australia) Mary Bevis Hawton (Australia) Beryl Penrose	(South Africa) Hazel Redick-Smith (South Africa) Julia Wipplinger	6–3, 8–6
1955	(Australia) Mary Bevis Hawton (Australia) Beryl Penrose	(Australia) Nell Hall Hopman (Australia) Gwen Thiele	7–5, 6–1
1956	(Australia) Mary Bevis Hawton (Australia) Thelma Coyne Long	(Australia) Mary Carter Reitano (Australia) Beryl Penrose	6–2, 5–7, 9–7
1957	(United States) Althea Gibson (United States) Shirley Fry Irvin	(Australia) Mary Bevis Hawton (Australia) Fay Muller	6–2, 6–1
1958	(Australia) Mary Bevis Hawton (Australia) Thelma Coyne Long	(Australia) Lorraine Coghlan Robinson (United Kingdom) Angela Mortimer	7–5, 6–8, 6–2
1959	(South Africa) Renée Schuurman (South Africa) Sandra Reynolds Price	(Australia) Lorraine Coghlan Robinson (Australia) Mary Carter Reitano	7–5,6–4
1960	(Brazil) Maria Bueno (United Kingdom) Christine Truman	(Australia) Lorraine Coghlan Robinson (Australia) Margaret Court	6–2, 5–7, 6–2
1961	(Australia) Mary Carter Reitano (Australia) Margaret Court	(Australia) Mary Bevis Hawton (Australia) Jan Lehane O'Neill	6–4, 3–6, 7–5
1962	(Australia) Margaret Court (Australia) Robyn Ebbern	(United States) Darlene Hard (Australia) Mary Carter Reitano	6–4, 6–4
1963	(Australia) Margaret Court (Australia) Robyn Ebbern	(Australia) Jan Lehane O'Neill (Australia) Lesley Turner Bowrey	6–1, 6–3
1964	(Australia) Judy Tegart-Dalton (Australia) Lesley Turner Bowrey	(Australia) Robyn Ebbern (Australia) Margaret Court	6–4, 6–4
1965	(Australia) Margaret Court (Australia) Lesley Turner Bowrey	(Australia) Robyn Ebbern (United States) Billie Jean King	1–6, 6–2, 6–3
1966	(United States) Carole Caldwell Graebner (United States) Nancy Richey	(Australia) Margaret Court (Australia) Lesley Turner Bowrey	6–4, 7–5
1967	(Australia) Lesley Turner Bowrey (Australia) Judy Tegart-Dalton	(Australia) Lorraine Coghlan Robinson (France) Évelyne Terras	6–0, 6–2
1968	(Australia) Karen Krantzcke (Australia) Kerry Melville Reid	(Australia) Judy Tegart-Dalton (Australia) Lesley Turner Bowrey	6–4, 3–6, 6–2

=== Australian Open ===
Year	Champions	Runners-up	Score
1969	(Australia) Margaret Court (Australia) Judy Tegart-Dalton	(United States) Rosemary Casals (United States) Billie Jean King	6–4, 6–4
1970	(Australia) Margaret Court (Australia) Judy Tegart-Dalton	(Australia) Karen Krantzcke (Australia) Kerry Melville Reid	6–3, 6–1
1971	(Australia) Evonne Goolagong (Australia) Margaret Court	(Australia) Jill Emmerson (Australia) Lesley Hunt	6–0, 6–0
1972	(Australia) Kerry Harris (Australia) Helen Gourlay Cawley	(Australia) Patricia Coleman (Australia) Karen Krantzcke	6–0, 6–4
1973	(Australia) Margaret Court (United Kingdom) Virginia Wade	(Australia) Kerry Harris (Australia) Kerry Melville	6–4, 6–4
1974	(Australia) Evonne Goolagong (United States) Peggy Michel	(Australia) Kerry Harris (Australia) Kerry Melville	7–5, 6–3
1975	(Australia) Evonne Goolagong Cawley (United States) Peggy Michel	(Australia) Margaret Court (Soviet Union) Olga Morozova	7–6, 7–6
1976	(Australia) Evonne Goolagong Cawley (Australia) Helen Gourlay Cawley	(Australia) Lesley Turner Bowrey (Czechoslovakia) Renáta Tomanová	8–1
1977 (Jan) (Note: Two Australian Opens were in held in 1977 because of a date change, the first in January and the second in December.)	(Australia) Dianne Fromholtz (Australia) Helen Gourlay Cawley	(Australia) Kerry Melville Reid (United States) Betsy Nagelsen	5–7, 6–1, 7–5
1977 (Dec)	(Australia) Evonne Goolagong Cawley (Australia) Helen Gourlay Cawley	(United States) Mona Schallau Guerrant (Australia) Kerry Melville Reid	Shared due to rain–out
1978	(United States) Betsy Nagelsen (Czechoslovakia) Renáta Tomanová	(Japan) Naoko Sato (Australia) Pam Whytcross	7–5, 6–2
1979	(New Zealand) Judy Connor Chaloner (Australia) Diane Evers Brown	(Australia) Leanne Harrison (Netherlands) Marcella Mesker	6–1, 3–6, 6–0
1980	(United States) Martina Navratilova (United States) Betsy Nagelsen	(United States) Ann Kiyomura (United States) Candy Reynolds	6–4, 6–4
1981	(United States) Kathy Jordan (United States) Anne Smith	(United States) Martina Navratilova (United States) Pam Shriver	6–2, 7–5
1982	(United States) Martina Navratilova (United States) Pam Shriver	(West Germany) Claudia Kohde-Kilsch (West Germany) Eva Pfaff	6–4, 6–2
1983	(United States) Martina Navratilova (United States) Pam Shriver	(United Kingdom) Anne Hobbs (Australia) Wendy Turnbull	6–4, 6–7, 6–2
1984	(United States) Martina Navratilova (United States) Pam Shriver	(West Germany) Claudia Kohde-Kilsch (Czechoslovakia) Helena Suková	6–3, 6–4
1985	(United States) Martina Navratilova (United States) Pam Shriver	(West Germany) Claudia Kohde-Kilsch (Czechoslovakia) Helena Suková	6–3, 6–4
1986	No competition (due to date change) (Note: The tournament was not held in 1986 because of a date change. See 1986 Australian Open tournament.)		
1987	(United States) Martina Navratilova (United States) Pam Shriver	(United States) Zina Garrison (United States) Lori McNeil	6–1, 6–0
1988	(United States) Martina Navratilova (United States) Pam Shriver	(United States) Chris Evert (Australia) Wendy Turnbull	6–0, 7–5
1989	(United States) Martina Navratilova (United States) Pam Shriver	(United States) Patty Fendick (Canada) Jill Hetherington	3–6, 6–3, 6–2
1990	(Czechoslovakia) Jana Novotná (Czechoslovakia) Helena Suková	(United States) Patty Fendick (United States) Mary Joe Fernández	7–6^{(7–5)}, 7–6^{(8–6)}
1991	(United States) Patty Fendick (United States) Mary Joe Fernández	(United States) Gigi Fernández (Czechoslovakia) Jana Novotná	7–6^{(7–4)}, 6–1
1992	(Spain) Arantxa Sánchez Vicario (Czechoslovakia) Helena Suková	(United States) Mary Joe Fernández (United States) Zina Garrison	6–4, 7–6^{(7–3)}
1993	(United States) Gigi Fernández (Belarus) Natalia Zvereva	(United States) Pam Shriver (Australia) Elizabeth Sayers Smylie	6–4, 6–3
1994	(United States) Gigi Fernández (Belarus) Natalia Zvereva	(United States) Patty Fendick (United States) Meredith McGrath	6–4, 4–6, 6–4
1995	(Czech Republic) Jana Novotná (Spain) Arantxa Sánchez Vicario	(United States) Gigi Fernández (Belarus) Natalia Zvereva	6–3, 6–7^{(7–9)}, 6–4
1996	(United States) Chanda Rubin (Spain) Arantxa Sánchez Vicario	(United States) Lindsay Davenport (United States) Mary Joe Fernández	7–5, 2–6, 6–4
1997	(Switzerland) Martina Hingis (Belarus) Natalia Zvereva	(United States) Lindsay Davenport (United States) Lisa Raymond	6–2, 6–2
1998	(Switzerland) Martina Hingis (Croatia) Mirjana Lučić	(United States) Lindsay Davenport (Belarus) Natalia Zvereva	6–4, 2–6, 6–3
1999	(Switzerland) Martina Hingis (Russia) Anna Kournikova	(United States) Lindsay Davenport (Belarus) Natalia Zvereva	7–5, 6–3
2000	(United States) Lisa Raymond (Australia) Rennae Stubbs	(Switzerland) Martina Hingis (France) Mary Pierce	6–4, 5–7, 6–4
2001	(United States) Serena Williams (United States) Venus Williams	(United States) Lindsay Davenport (United States) Corina Morariu	6–2, 4–6, 6–4
2002	(Switzerland) Martina Hingis (Russia) Anna Kournikova	(Slovakia) Daniela Hantuchová (Spain) Arantxa Sánchez Vicario	6–2, 6–7^{(7–9)}, 6–1
2003	(United States) Serena Williams (United States) Venus Williams	(Spain) Virginia Ruano Pascual (Argentina) Paola Suárez	4–6, 6–4, 6–3
2004	(Spain) Virginia Ruano Pascual (Argentina) Paola Suárez	(Russia) Svetlana Kuznetsova (Russia) Elena Likhovtseva	6–4, 6–3
2005	(Russia) Svetlana Kuznetsova (Australia) Alicia Molik	(United States) Lindsay Davenport (United States) Corina Morariu	6–3, 6–4
2006	(China) Yan Zi (China) Zheng Jie	(United States) Lisa Raymond (Australia) Samantha Stosur	2–6, 7–6^{(9–7)}, 6–3
2007	(Zimbabwe) Cara Black (South Africa) Liezel Huber	(Chinese Taipei) Chan Yung-jan (Chinese Taipei) Chuang Chia-jung	6–4, 6–7^{(4–7)}, 6–1
2008	(Ukraine) Alona Bondarenko (Ukraine) Kateryna Bondarenko	(Belarus) Victoria Azarenka (Israel) Shahar Pe'er	2–6, 6–1, 6–4
2009	(United States) Serena Williams (United States) Venus Williams	(Slovakia) Daniela Hantuchová (Japan) Ai Sugiyama	6–3, 6–3
2010	(United States) Serena Williams (United States) Venus Williams	(Zimbabwe) Cara Black (United States) Liezel Huber	6–4, 6–3
2011	(Argentina) Gisela Dulko (Italy) Flavia Pennetta	(Belarus) Victoria Azarenka (Russia) Maria Kirilenko	2–6, 7–5, 6–1
2012	(Russia) Svetlana Kuznetsova (Russia) Vera Zvonareva	(Italy) Sara Errani (Italy) Roberta Vinci	5–7, 6–4, 6–3
2013	(Italy) Sara Errani (Italy) Roberta Vinci	(Australia) Ashleigh Barty (Australia) Casey Dellacqua	6–2, 3–6, 6–2
2014	(Italy) Sara Errani (Italy) Roberta Vinci	(Russia) Ekaterina Makarova (Russia) Elena Vesnina	6–4, 3–6, 7–5
2015	(United States) Bethanie Mattek-Sands (Czech Republic) Lucie Šafářová	(Chinese Taipei) Chan Yung-jan (China) Zheng Jie	6–4, 7–6^{(7–5)}
2016	(Switzerland) Martina Hingis (India) Sania Mirza	(Czech Republic) Andrea Hlaváčková (Czech Republic) Lucie Hradecká	7–6^{(7–1)}, 6–3
2017	(United States) Bethanie Mattek-Sands (Czech Republic) Lucie Šafářová	(Czech Republic) Andrea Hlaváčková (China) Peng Shuai	6–7^{(4–7)}, 6–3, 6–3
2018	(Hungary) Tímea Babos (France) Kristina Mladenovic	(Russia) Ekaterina Makarova (Russia) Elena Vesnina	6–4, 6–3
2019	(Australia) Samantha Stosur (China) Zhang Shuai	(Hungary) Tímea Babos (France) Kristina Mladenovic	6–3, 6–4
2020	(Hungary) Tímea Babos (France) Kristina Mladenovic	(Chinese Taipei) Hsieh Su-wei (Czech Republic) Barbora Strýcová	6–2, 6–1
2021	(Belgium) Elise Mertens (Belarus) Aryna Sabalenka	(Czech Republic) Barbora Krejčíková (Czech Republic) Kateřina Siniaková	6–2, 6–3
2022	(Czech Republic) Barbora Krejčíková (Czech Republic) Kateřina Siniaková	(Kazakhstan) Anna Danilina (Brazil) Beatriz Haddad Maia	6–7^{(3–7)}, 6–4, 6–4
2023	(Czech Republic) Barbora Krejčíková (Czech Republic) Kateřina Siniaková	(Japan) Shuko Aoyama (Japan) Ena Shibahara	6–4, 6–3
2024	(Chinese Taipei) Hsieh Su-wei (Belgium) Elise Mertens	(Ukraine) Lyudmyla Kichenok (Latvia) Jeļena Ostapenko	6–1, 7–5
2025	(Czech Republic) Kateřina Siniaková (United States) Taylor Townsend	(Chinese Taipei) Hsieh Su-wei (Latvia) Jeļena Ostapenko	6–2, 6–7^{(4–7)}, 6–3
2026	(Belgium) Elise Mertens (China) Zhang Shuai	(Kazakhstan) Anna Danilina (Serbia) Aleksandra Krunić	7–6^{(7–4)}, 6–4

== See also ==
Australian Open other competitions

- List of Australian Open men's singles champions
- List of Australian Open men's doubles champions
- List of Australian Open women's singles champions
- List of Australian Open mixed doubles champions

Grand Slam women's doubles

- List of French Open women's doubles champions
- List of Wimbledon ladies' doubles champions
- List of US Open women's doubles champions
- List of Grand Slam women's doubles champions
