= 1939 Australian Championships – Men's doubles =

Men's doubles
- 1939 Australian Championships

Final
- Champions: (Australia) John Bromwich (Australia) Adrian Quist
- Runners-up: (Australia) Colin Long (Australia) Don Turnbull
- Score: 6–4, 7–5, 6–2

Details
- Draw: 16
- Seeds: 4

Events
Singles	men	women		boys	girls
Doubles	men	women	mixed	boys	girls
← 1938 ·	Australian Championships	· 1940 →

Defending champions John Bromwich and Adrian Quist defeated Colin Long and Don Turnbull 6–4, 7–5, 6–2, to win the men's doubles tennis title at the 1939 Australian Championships.

== Seeds ==
1. (Australia) John Bromwich / (Australia) Adrian Quist (champions)
2. (Australia) Harry Hopman / (Australia) Len Schwartz (semifinals)
3. (Australia) Jack Crawford / (Australia) Vivian McGrath (semifinals)
4. (Australia) Jack Clemenger / (Australia) Jack Harper (quarterfinals)

== Draw ==
=== Key ===
- Q = Qualifier
- WC = Wild card
- LL = Lucky loser
- Alt = Alternate
- ITF = ITF entry
- PR = Protected ranking
- SR = Special ranking
- SE = Special exempt
- JE = Junior exempt
- JR = Junior Accelerator Programme entrant
- CO = College Accelerator Programme entrant
- NG = Next Gen Accelerator Program entrant
- w/o = Walkover
- r = Retired
- d = Defaulted

First round
1	(Australia) John Bromwich (Australia) Adrian Quist	6	6	6
(Australia) Max McDermott (Australia) Vernon Mursell	2	1	1
(Australia) Jim Gilchrist (Australia) Les Hancock	6	6	6
(Australia) G. Derham (Australia) James Derham	4	3	2
3	(Australia) Jack Crawford (Australia) Vivian McGrath	6	9	1	6
(Australia) Ted Anstee (Australia) Lionel Brodie	3	7	6	4
(Australia) George Holland (Australia) Mervyn Weston	6	9	6
(Australia) Max Bonner (Australia) Norman Wasley	3	7	4
4	(Australia) Jack Clemenger (Australia) Jack Harper	10	6	6
(Australia) Alfred Chave (Australia) George Wilkinson	8	2	3
(Australia) Colin Long (Australia) Don Turnbull	6	6	6
(Australia) John Diggle (Australia) Alan Hartley	4	2	0
2	(Australia) Harry Hopman (Australia) Len Schwartz	6	6	6
(Australia) Tom Carey (Australia) Bert Tonkin	3	2	1
(Australia) Dinny Pails (Australia) Bill Sidwell	6	3	8	6	6
(Australia) Reg Ewin (Australia) Gar Moon	1	6	6	8	2

Quarterfinals
1	(Australia) John Bromwich (Australia) Adrian Quist	7	6	6
(Australia) Jim Gilchrist (Australia) Les Hancock	5	0	2
3	(Australia) Jack Crawford (Australia) Vivian McGrath	6	6	6
(Australia) George Holland (Australia) Mervyn Weston	4	4	0
4	(Australia) Jack Clemenger (Australia) Jack Harper	3	6	2	5
(Australia) Colin Long (Australia) Don Turnbull	6	3	6	7
2	(Australia) Harry Hopman (Australia) Len Schwartz	6	4	6	6
(Australia) Dinny Pails (Australia) Bill Sidwell	4	6	2	3

Semifinals
1	(Australia) John Bromwich (Australia) Adrian Quist	6	6	6
3	(Australia) Jack Crawford (Australia) Vivian McGrath	3	1	0
(Australia) Colin Long (Australia) Don Turnbull	6	2	6	6
2	(Australia) Harry Hopman (Australia) Len Schwartz	2	6	4	3

Final
1	(Australia) John Bromwich (Australia) Adrian Quist	6	7	6
(Australia) Colin Long (Australia) Don Turnbull	4	5	2
