= 1939 Australian Championships – Men's singles =

Tennis event results

Men's singles
- 1939 Australian Championships

Final
- Champion: (Australia) John Bromwich
- Runner-up: (Australia) Adrian Quist
- Score: 6–4, 6–1, 6–2

Details
- Draw: 32
- Seeds: 8

Events
Singles	men	women		boys	girls
Doubles	men	women	mixed	boys	girls
- Australian Championships

John Bromwich defeated Adrian Quist 6–4, 6–1, 6–2 in the final to win the men's singles tennis title at the 1939 Australian Championships.

== Seeds ==
The seeded players are listed below. John Bromwich is the champion; others show the round in which they were eliminated.

1. (Australia) John Bromwich (champion)
2. (Australia) Adrian Quist (finalist)
3. (Australia) Harry Hopman (quarterfinals)
4. (Australia) Jack Crawford (semifinals)
5. (Australia) Len Schwartz (second round)
6. (Australia) Vivian McGrath (semifinals)
7. (Australia) Don Turnbull (quarterfinals)
8. (Australia) Jack Harper (first round)

== Draw ==
=== Key ===
- Q = Qualifier
- WC = Wild card
- LL = Lucky loser
- r = Retired

=== Finals ===
Quarterfinals
1	(Australia) John Bromwich	7	6	6
7	(Australia) Don Turnbull	5	1	0
3	(Australia) Harry Hopman	1	6	4	3
6	(Australia) Vivian McGrath	6	4	6	6
2	(Australia) Adrian Quist	6	6	6	6
(Australia) Lionel Brodie	3	2	8	3
4	(Australia) Jack Crawford	4	6	2	6	6
(Australia) James Gilchrist	6	4	6	3	4

Semifinals
1	(Australia) John Bromwich	6	6	6
6	(Australia) Vivian McGrath	0	3	4
2	(Australia) Adrian Quist	6	7	6
4	(Australia) Jack Crawford	1	5	3

Final
1	(Australia) John Bromwich	6	6	6
2	(Australia) Adrian Quist	4	1	2

=== Earlier rounds ===
==== Section 1 ====
First round
1	(Australia) Bromwich	6	6	6
(Australia) Anstee	2	3	1
(Australia) Long	4	6
(Australia) Clemenger	6	3
7	(Australia) Turnbull	6	6	6
(Australia) Impey	3	0	3
(Australia) Vaughan	6	3	6	8	6
(Australia) Wasley	4	6	3	10	3
3	(Australia) Hopman	6	6	6
(Australia) Vickers-Willis	1	1	1
(Australia) Moon	6	6	6
(Australia) Lean	4	1	1
6	(Australia) McGrath	6	6	6
(Australia) Holland	2	3	4
(Australia) Bonner	6	6	6
(Australia) Callaghan	2	3	3

Second round
1	(Australia) Bromwich	6	6	8
(Australia) Long	3	2	6
7	(Australia) Turnbull	6	6	6
(Australia) Vaughan	2	1	3
3	(Australia) Hopman	6	6	6
(Australia) Moon	2	1	1
6	(Australia) McGrath	6	3	6	6
(Australia) Bonner	3	6	1	4

Quarterfinals
1	(Australia) Bromwich	7	6	6
7	(Australia) Turnbull	5	1	0
3	(Australia) Hopman	1	6	4	3
6	(Australia) McGrath	6	4	6	6

Semifinals
1	(Australia) Bromwich	6	6	6
6	(Australia) McGrath	0	3	4

==== Section 2 ====
First round
2	(Australia) Quist	8	6	6
(Australia) Wilkinson	6	1	3
(Australia) Pails	6	7	7
(Australia) Weston	1	5	5
(Australia) Sidwell	6	10	2	6
8	(Australia) Harper	2	8	6	4
(Australia) Brodie	6	6	6
(Australia) Hancock	1	2	1
4	(Australia) Crawford	6	6	6
(Australia) Liddle	4	0	2
(Australia) Ewin	6	6	6
(Australia) Felan	1	3	1
5	(Australia) Schwartz	6	6	6
(Australia) Pyle	2	0	1
(Australia) Gilchrist	5	4	6	6	6
(Australia) Kay	7	6	0	2	3

Second round
2	(Australia) Quist	6	6	6
(Australia) Pails	2	4	3
(Australia) Sidwell	2	5	4
(Australia) Brodie	6	7	6
4	(Australia) Crawford	6	6	6
(Australia) Ewin	2	1	2
5	(Australia) Schwartz	2	3	3
(Australia) Gilchrist	6	6	6

Quarterfinals
2	(Australia) Quist	6	6	6	6
(Australia) Brodie	3	2	8	3
4	(Australia) Crawford	4	6	2	6	6
(Australia) Gilchrist	6	4	6	3	4

Semifinals
2	(Australia) Quist	6	7	6
4	(Australia) Crawford	1	5	3

Preceded by 1938 U.S. National Championships	Grand Slam men's singles	Succeeded by 1939 French Championships
