= 1939 Australian Championships – Women's doubles =

Women's doubles
- 1939 Australian Championships

Final
- Champions: (Australia) Thelma Coyne (Australia) Nancye Wynne
- Runners-up: (Australia) May Hardcastle (Australia) Emily Hood Westacott
- Score: 7–5, 6–4

Details
- Draw: 13
- Seeds: 4

Events
Singles	men	women		boys	girls
Doubles	men	women	mixed	boys	girls
- Australian Championships

Thelma Coyne and Nancye Wynne successfully defended their title for a fourth consecutive year, defeating May Hardcastle and Emily Hood Westacott 7–5, 6–4 in the final, to win the women's doubles tennis title at the 1939 Australian Championships.

== Seeds ==
1. (Australia) Thelma Coyne / (Australia) Nancye Wynne (champions)
2. (Australia) Nell Hopman / (Australia) Dot Stevenson (semifinals)
3. (Australia) May Blick / (Australia) Margaret Wilson (semifinals)
4. (Australia) May Hardcastle / (Australia) Emily Hood Westacott (final)

== Draw ==
Key

- Q = Qualifier
- WC = Wild card
- LL = Lucky loser
- Alt = Alternate
- ITF = ITF entry
- PR = Protected ranking
- SR = Special ranking
- SE = Special exempt
- JE = Junior exempt
- JR = Junior Accelerator Programme entrant
- CO = College Accelerator Programme entrant
- NG = Next Gen Accelerator Program entrant
- w/o = Walkover
- r = Retired
- d = Defaulted

=== Draw ===
First round
(Australia) Nancy Chitty (Australia) Connie Coate	w/o
(Australia) Dorn McGill (Australia) Eileen McGill
4	(Australia) May Hardcastle (Australia) Emily Hood Westacott	6	4	6
(Australia) Thora Geddes (Australia) Joan Pett	2	6	2
(Australia) Sadie Berryman (Australia) Gwen O'Halloran	15	9
(Australia) Birdie Bond (Australia) Hazel Elliget	13	7
1	(Australia) Thelma Coyne (Australia) Nancye Wynne	6	6
(Australia) Eunice Hunt (Australia) Elaine Lovett	0	1
(Australia) Joan Hartigan (Australia) Edie Niemeyer	6	6
(Australia) Audrey Lewin (United States) Edith Tough	3	2

Quarterfinals
2	(Australia) Nell Hopman (Australia) Dot Stevenson	6	6
(Australia) Nancy Chitty (Australia) Connie Coate	1	4
4	(Australia) May Hardcastle (Australia) Emily Hood Westacott
(Australia) Sadie Berryman (Australia) Gwen OHalloran
1	(Australia) Thelma Coyne (Australia) Nancye Wynne	6	1	6
(Australia) Joan Hartigan (Australia) Edie Niemeyer	4	6	1
3	(Australia) May Blick (Australia) Margaret Wilson	6	3	6
(Australia) Doris Mauger (Australia) Gwen Stevenson	4	6	3

Semifinals
2	(Australia) Nell Hopman (Australia) Dot Stevenson	2	4
4	(Australia) May Hardcastle (Australia) Emily Hood Westacott	6	6
1	(Australia) Thelma Coyne (Australia) Nancye Wynne	6	6
3	(Australia) May Blick (Australia) Margaret Wilson	0	3

Final
4	(Australia) May Hardcastle (Australia) Emily Hood Westacott	5	4
1	(Australia) Thelma Coyne (Australia) Nancye Wynne	7	6
