= 1939 Australian Championships =

- Date: 20–28 January 1939
- Edition: 32nd
- Category: Grand Slam (ITF)
- Surface: Grass
- Location: Melbourne, Australia
- Venue: Kooyong Stadium

Champions

Men's singles
- (Australia) John Bromwich

Women's singles
- (Australia) Emily Hood Westacott

Men's doubles
- (Australia) John Bromwich / (Australia) Adrian Quist

Women's doubles
- (Australia) Thelma Coyne / (Australia) Nancye Wynne

Mixed doubles
- (Australia) Nell Hall Hopman / (Australia) Harry Hopman

Boys' singles
- (Australia) Bill Sidwell

Girls' singles
- (Australia) Joyce Wood

Boys' doubles
- (Australia) Roy Felan / (Australia) Harold Impey

Girls' doubles
- (Australia) Alison Burton / (Australia) Joyce Wood
- Australian Championships

The 1939 Australian Championships was a tennis tournament that took place on outdoor Grass courts at the Kooyong Stadium in Melbourne, Australia from 20 January to 30 January. It was the 32nd edition of the Australian Championships (now known as the Australian Open), the 9th held in Melbourne, and the first Grand Slam tournament of the year. Australians John Bromwich and Emily Hood Westacott won the singles titles.

== Finals ==
=== Men's singles ===
(Australia) John Bromwich defeated (Australia) Adrian Quist 6–4, 6–1, 6–3

=== Women's singles ===
(Australia) Emily Hood Westacott defeated (Australia) Nell Hall Hopman 6–1, 6–2

=== Men's doubles ===
(Australia) John Bromwich / (Australia) Adrian Quist defeated (Australia) Colin Long / (Australia) Don Turnbull 6–4, 7–5, 6–2

=== Women's doubles ===
(Australia) Thelma Coyne / (Australia) Nancye Wynne defeated (Australia) May Hardcastle / (Australia) Emily Hood Westacott 7–5, 6–4

=== Mixed doubles ===
(Australia) Nell Hall Hopman / (Australia) Harry Hopman defeated (Australia) Margaret Wilson / (Australia) John Bromwich 6–8, 6–3, 6–2

Preceded by 1938 U.S. National Championships	Grand Slams	Succeeded by 1939 French Championships
