= 1939 Australian Championships – Women's singles =

Women's singles
- 1939 Australian Championships

Final
- Champion: (Australia) Emily Hood Westacott
- Runner-up: (Australia) Nell Hopman
- Score: 6–1, 6–2

Details
- Seeds: 8

Events
Singles	men	women		boys	girls
Doubles	men	women	mixed	boys	girls
- Australian Championships

Sixth-seeded Emily Hood Westacott defeated Nell Hopman 6–1, 6–2, in the final to win the women's singles tennis title at the 1939 Australian Championships held in Melbourne.

== Seeds ==
The seeded players are listed below. Emily Westacott is the champion; others show the round in which they were eliminated.

1. (Australia) Nancye Wynne (second round)
2. (Australia) Thelma Coyne (semifinals)
3. (Australia) Nell Hopman (finalist)
4. (Australia) Joan Hartigan (semifinals)
5. (Australia) Dorothy Stevenson (second round)
6. (Australia) Emily Hood Westacott (champion)
7. (Australia) May Hardcastle (quarterfinals)
8. (Australia) Sadie Berryman (quarterfinals)

== Draw ==
=== Key ===
- Q = Qualifier
- WC = Wild card
- LL = Lucky loser
- r = Retired

=== Finals ===
Quarterfinals
(Australia) Constance Coate	4	2
6	(Australia) Emily Hood Westacott	6	6
4	(Australia) Joan Hartigan	6	6
8	(Australia) Sadie Berryman	1	4
2	(Australia) Thelma Coyne	1	6	6
(Australia) May Blick	6	4	1
3	(Australia) Nell Hopman	6	6
7	(Australia) May Hardcastle	3	3

Semifinals
6	(Australia) Emily Hood Westacott	6	6
4	(Australia) Joan Hartigan	2	3
2	(Australia) Thelma Coyne	3	4
3	(Australia) Nell Hopman	6	6

Finals
6	(Australia) Emily Hood Westacott	6	6
3	(Australia) Nell Hopman	1	2

=== Earlier rounds ===
==== Section 1 ====
First round
(Australia) Niemeyer	6	6
(United States) Tough	0	4
8	(Australia) Berryman	6	6
(Australia) Lewin	3	3
(Australia) Bond	6	3	6
(Australia) Hunt	1	6	3

Second round
1	(Australia) Wynne	6	3	2
(Australia) Coate	1	6	6
6	(Australia) Westacott	8	6
(Australia) Wilson	6	3
4	(Australia) Hartigan	6	6
(Australia) Niemeyer	2	1
8	(Australia) Berryman	6	6
(Australia) Bond	4	0

Quarterfinals
(Australia) Coate	4	2
6	(Australia) Westacott	6	6
4	(Australia) Hartigan	6	6
8	(Australia) Berryman	1	4

Semifinals
6	(Australia) Westacott	6	6
4	(Australia) Hartigan	2	3

==== Section 2 ====
First round
2	(Australia) Coyne	6	6
(Australia) Lack	1	0
(Australia) Stern	6	7
(Australia) Chitty	0	5
5	(Australia) Stevenson	6	6
(New Zealand) Kerr	0	0

Second round
2	(Australia) Coyne	6	6
(Australia) Stern	2	4
5	(Australia) Stevenson	6	4	4
(Australia) Blick	4	6	6
3	(Australia) Hopman	6	6
(Australia) Elliget	2	2
7	(Australia) Hardcastle	6	6
(Australia) O'Halloran	1	2

Quarterfinals
2	(Australia) Coyne	1	6	6
(Australia) Blick	6	4	1
3	(Australia) Hopman	6	6
7	(Australia) Hardcastle	3	3

Semifinals
2	(Australia) Coyne	3	4
3	(Australia) Hopman	6	6

Preceded by 1938 U.S. National Championships – Women's singles	Grand Slam women's singles	Succeeded by 1939 French Championships – Women's singles
