= 1947 Australian Championships =

- Date: 17–27 January 1947
- Edition: 35th
- Category: Grand Slam (ITF)
- Surface: Grass
- Location: Sydney, Australia
- Venue: White City Tennis Club

Champions

Men's singles
- (Australia) Dinny Pails

Women's singles
- (Australia) Nancye Wynne Bolton

Men's doubles
- (Australia) John Bromwich / (Australia) Adrian Quist

Women's doubles
- (Australia) Thelma Coyne Long / (Australia) Nancye Wynne Bolton

Mixed doubles
- (Australia) Nancye Wynne Bolton / (Australia) Colin Long
- Australian Championships

The 1947 Australian Championships was a tennis tournament that took place on outdoor Grass courts at the White City Tennis Club, Sydney, Australia from 18 January to 27 January. It was the 35th edition of the Australian Championships (now known as the Australian Open), the 10th held in Sydney, and the first Grand Slam tournament of the year. The singles titles were won by Australians Dinny Pails and Nancye Wynne Bolton.

== Finals ==
=== Men's singles ===
(Australia) Dinny Pails defeated (Australia) John Bromwich 4–6, 6–4, 3–6, 7–5, 8–6

=== Women's singles ===
(Australia) Nancye Wynne Bolton defeated (Australia) Nell Hall Hopman 6–3, 6–2

=== Men's doubles ===
(Australia) John Bromwich / (Australia) Adrian Quist defeated (Australia) Frank Sedgman / (Australia) George Worthington 6–1, 6–3, 6–1

=== Women's doubles ===
(Australia) Thelma Coyne Long / (Australia) Nancye Wynne Bolton defeated (Australia) Mary Bevis / (Australia) Joyce Fitch 6–3, 6–3

=== Mixed doubles ===
(Australia) Nancye Wynne Bolton / (Australia) Colin Long defeated (Australia) Joyce Fitch / (Australia) John Bromwich 6–3, 6–3

Preceded by 1946 U.S. National Championships	Grand Slams	Succeeded by 1947 Wimbledon Championships
