= 1946 Australian Championships =

- Date: 19–29 January 1946
- Edition: 34th
- Category: Grand Slam (ITF)
- Surface: Grass
- Location: Adelaide, Australia
- Venue: Memorial Drive

Champions

Men's singles
- (Australia) John Bromwich

Women's singles
- (Australia) Nancye Wynne Bolton

Men's doubles
- (Australia) John Bromwich / (Australia) Adrian Quist

Women's doubles
- (Australia) Joyce Fitch / (Australia) Mary Bevis Hawton

Mixed doubles
- (Australia) Nancye Wynne Bolton / (Australia) Colin Long
- Australian Championships

The 1946 Australian Championships was a tennis tournament that took place on outdoor grass courts at the Memorial Drive, Adelaide, Australia from 19 January to 29 January. It was the 34th edition of the Australian Championships (now known as the Australian Open), the 8th held in Adelaide, and the first Grand Slam tournament of the year. It was also the first edition of the championship after a five-year hiatus due to World War II. The singles titles were won by Australians John Bromwich and Nancye Wynne Bolton.

== Finals ==
=== Men's singles ===
(Australia) John Bromwich defeated (Australia) Dinny Pails 5–7, 6–3, 7–5, 3–6, 6–2

=== Women's singles ===
(Australia) Nancye Wynne Bolton defeated (Australia) Joyce Fitch 6–4, 6–4

=== Men's doubles ===
(Australia) John Bromwich / (Australia) Adrian Quist defeated (Australia) Max Newcombe / (Australia) Len Schwartz 6–3, 6–1, 9–7

=== Women's doubles ===
(Australia) Joyce Fitch / (Australia) Mary Bevis defeated (Australia) Nancye Wynne Bolton / (Australia) Thelma Coyne Long 9–7, 6–4

=== Mixed doubles ===
(Australia) Nancye Wynne Bolton / (Australia) Colin Long defeated (Australia) Joyce Fitch / (Australia) John Bromwich 6–0, 6–4

Preceded by 1945 U.S. National Championships	Grand Slams	Succeeded by 1946 Wimbledon Championships
