= 1946 Australian Championships – Women's singles =

Women's singles
- 1946 Australian Championships

Final
- Champion: (Australia) Nancye Bolton
- Runner-up: (Australia) Joyce Fitch
- Score: 6–4, 6–4

Details
- Draw: 23
- Seeds: 8

Events
Singles	men	women		boys	girls
Doubles	men	women	mixed	boys	girls
- Australian Championships

First-seeded Nancye Bolton defeated Joyce Fitch 6–4, 6–4 in the final to win the women's singles tennis title at the 1946 Australian Championships.

== Seeds ==
The seeded players are listed below. Nancye Bolton is the champion; others show the round in which they were eliminated.

1. (Australia) Nancye Bolton (champion)
2. (Australia) Nell Hopman (quarterfinals)
3. (Australia) Thelma Long (quarterfinals)
4. (Australia) Joan Hartigan (quarterfinals)
5. (Australia) Constance Wilson (semifinals)
6. (Australia) Alison Hattersley (second round)
7. (Australia) Dulcie Whittaker (quarterfinals)
8. (Australia) Joyce Fitch (finalist)

== Draw ==
=== Key ===
- Q = Qualifier
- WC = Wild card
- LL = Lucky loser
- r = Retired

=== Finals ===
Quarterfinals
5	(Australia) Constance Wilson	6	8
4	(Australia) Joan Hartigan	2	6
7	(Australia) Dulcie Whittaker	2	2
1	(Australia) Nancye Bolton	6	6
8	(Australia) Joyce Fitch	6	6
3	(Australia) Thelma Long	2	4
(Australia) Marie Toomey	6	4	6
2	(Australia) Nell Hopman	2	6	3

Semifinals
5	(Australia) Constance Wilson	2	1
1	(Australia) Nancye Bolton	6	6
8	(Australia) Joyce Fitch	7	6
(Australia) Marie Toomey	5	4

Finals
1	(Australia) Nancye Bolton	6	6
8	(Australia) Joyce Fitch	4	4

=== Earlier rounds ===
==== Section 1 ====
First round
(Australia) Cane	0	1
7	(Australia) Whittaker	6	6
(Australia) Pellew	2	3
(Australia) Proctor	6	6
(Australia) Cock	1	1
1	(Australia) Bolton	6	6

Second round
(Australia) Thiele	4	4
5	(Australia) Wilson	6	6
(Australia) McGill	6	4	2
4	(Australia) Hartigan	4	6	6
(Australia) Jones	2	4
7	(Australia) Whittaker	6	6
(Australia) Proctor	2	2
1	(Australia) Bolton	6	6

Quarterfinals
5	(Australia) Wilson	6	8
4	(Australia) Hartigan	2	6
7	(Australia) Whittaker	2	2
1	(Australia) Bolton	6	6

Semifinals
5	(Australia) Wilson	2	1
1	(Australia) Bolton	6	6

==== Section 2 ====
First round
(Australia) Moran	2	3
(Australia) Traeger	6	6
(Australia) Stevens	2	2
8	(Australia) Fitch	6	6
(Australia) Spehr-Jones	1	3
(Australia) Niemeyer	6	6
(Australia) Sheidow	2	1
3	(Australia) Long	6	6

Second round
(Australia) Traeger	0	1
8	(Australia) Fitch	6	6
(Australia) Niemeyer	1	3
3	(Australia) Long	6	6
(Australia) Toomey	5	7	6
6	(Australia) Hattersley	7	5	3
(Australia) Beavis	4	4
2	(Australia) Hopman	6	6

Quarterfinals
8	(Australia) Fitch	6	6
3	(Australia) Long	2	4
(Australia) Toomey	6	4	6
2	(Australia) Hopman	2	6	3

Semifinals
8	(Australia) Fitch	7	6
(Australia) Toomey	5	4

Preceded by 1945 U.S. National Championships	Grand Slam women's singles	Succeeded by 1946 Wimbledon Championships
