= James Gilchrist (tennis) =

Australian tennis player

- Full name: William James Gilchrist
- Country (sports): Australia
- Born: 1 February 1919 Molong, New South Wales, Australia
- Died: 29 February 2004 (aged 85)
- Turned pro: 1936 (amateur tour)
- Retired: 1951

Singles

Grand Slam singles results
- Australian Open: QF (1939)

Doubles

Grand Slam doubles results
- Australian Open: QF (1936, 1937, 1939, 1940, 1947)

Mixed doubles

Grand Slam mixed doubles results
- Australian Open: SF (1939)

James Gilchrist (1 February 1919 – 29 February 2004) was an Australian tennis player. He was reaching his peak just as World war 2 broke out. After serving in the war, Gilchrist resumed his career. Gilchrist had a good serve and powerful forehand, but a weak backhand, though he worked hard to improve it. Gilchrist won several tournaments, but at the Australian championships he often lost to Bromwich or Quist, the two best Australian players of that era. Gilchrist made his Grand Slam debut at 1936 Australian championships and lost in round two to Adrian Quist. In 1938 he lost in round two to John Bromwich. In 1939 he reached the quarter-finals and lost to Jack Crawford in five sets. At the Australian championships in 1940, Gilchrist beat Jack Cummings before losing to Quist in round two. In 1947 he lost in round two of the Australian championships to Bromwich. In 1951 he lost in the second round to Quist.
