= Joyce Fitch =

Australian tennis player

- Full name: Joyce Mary Fitch Rymer
- Country (sports): Australia
- Residence: Victoria, Australia
- Born: 3 April 1922 Victoria, Australia
- Died: 26 July 2012 (aged 90) Auckland, New Zealand

Singles
- Career titles: No.2 (AUS)

Grand Slam singles results
- Australian Open: F (1946)
- Wimbledon: 4R (1949)

Grand Slam doubles results
- Australian Open: W (1946)
- Wimbledon: 2R (1949)

Grand Slam mixed doubles results
- Australian Open: F (1946, 1947, 1949, 1950)

Joyce Fitch Rymer (née Fitch; 3 April 1922 – 26 July 2012) was a tennis player from Australia who reached the women's singles final of the 1946 Australian Championships, losing to Nancye Wynne Bolton 6–4, 6–4. She teamed with Mary Bevis Hawton to win the women's doubles title at the 1946 Australian Championships, defeating Bolton and Thelma Coyne Long in the final 9–7, 6–4. Rymer and Hawton reached the women's doubles final at the 1947 and 1951 Australian Championships, losing both years to the Bolton-Long team. In 1946, 1947 and 1949 she reached the finals of the Australian Championships in mixed doubles with partner, John Bromwich and again in 1950 with Eric Sturgess, losing all four times.

Fitch married John Oliver Rymer in May 1951 and did not play competitive tennis until 1955 when she played doubles with her longtime doubles partner Mary Bevis Hawton.

== Grand Slam finals ==
=== Singles: 1 (1 runners-up) ===
Result	Year	Championship	Surface	Opponent	Score
Loss	1946	Australian Championships	Grass	(Australia) Nancye Wynne Bolton	4–6, 4–6

=== Doubles: 2 (1 title, 1 runner-up) ===
Result	Year	Championship	Surface	Partner	Opponents	Score
Win	1946	Australian Championships	Grass	(Australia) Mary Hawton	(Australia) Nancye Wynne Bolton (Australia) Thelma Coyne Long	9–7, 6–4
Loss	1947	Australian Championships	Grass	(Australia) Mary Hawton	(Australia) Nancye Wynne Bolton (Australia) Thelma Coyne Long	3–6, 3–6

=== Mixed Doubles: 4 (4 runner-ups) ===
Result	Year	Championship	Surface	Partner	Opponents	Score
Loss	1946	Australian Championships	Grass	(Australia) John Bromwich	(Australia) Nancye Wynne Bolton (Australia) Colin Long	0–6, 4–6
Loss	1947	Australian Championships	Grass	(Australia) John Bromwich	(Australia) Nancye Wynne Bolton (Australia) Colin Long	3–6, 3–6
Loss	1949	Australian Championships	Grass	(Australia) John Bromwich	(United States) Doris Hart (Australia) Frank Sedgman	1–6, 7–5, 10–12
Loss	1950	Australian Championships	Grass	(South Africa) Eric Sturgess	(United States) Doris Hart (Australia) Frank Sedgman	6–8, 4–6

== Grand Slam singles tournament timeline ==
Key
W	F	SF	QF	#R	RR	Q#	DNQ	A	NH

(W) winner; (F) finalist; (SF) semifinalist; (QF) quarterfinalist; (#R) rounds 4, 3, 2, 1; (RR) round-robin stage; (Q#) qualification round; (DNQ) did not qualify; (A) absent; (NH) not held; (SR) strike rate (events won / competed); (W–L) win–loss record.

Tournament	1946^{1}	1947^{1}	1948	1949	1950	1951	Career SR
Australian Championships	F	QF	A	2R	SF	SF	0 / 5
French Championships	A	A	A	A	A	A	0 / 0
Wimbledon	A	A	A	4R	A	A	0 / 1
U.S. Championships	A	A	A	A	A	A	0 / 0
SR	0 / 1	0 / 1	0 / 0	0 / 2	0 / 1	0 / 1	0 / 6

^{1}In 1946 and 1947, the French Championships were held after Wimbledon.

== See also ==
- Performance timelines for all female tennis players since 1978 who reached at least one Grand Slam final
