= Dinny Pails =

Australian tennis player (1921–1986)

- Full name: Dennis Robert Pails
- Country (sports): Australia
- Born: 4 March 1921; Nottingham, England
- Died: 22 November 1986 (aged 65); Sydney, Australia
- Turned pro: 1947 (amateur from 1937)
- Retired: 1969
- Plays: Right-handed (one-handed backhand)

Singles
- Career record: 322–226 (58.7%)
- Career titles: 18
- Highest ranking: No. 6 (1947, John Olliff)

Grand Slam singles results
- Australian Open: W (1947)
- Wimbledon: SF (1947)
- US Open: 4R (1947)
- Professional majors
- US Pro: QF (1948, 1957)
- Wembley Pro: QF (1949, 1952)

Doubles

Grand Slam doubles results
- Australian Open: SF (1946)
- Wimbledon: F (1946)

Grand Slam mixed doubles results
- Wimbledon: QF (1946)

Dennis "Dinny" Pails (4 March 1921 – 22 November 1986) was an Australian tennis champion.

Pails was born in England, but moved to Australia in 1922 at age 1.

Pails won the men's singles championship at the Australian Championships in 1947. Pails defeated John Bromwich in the final in five sets, saving a match point in the process. Pails played eight Davis Cup matches between 1946 and 1947, winning three matches and losing five.

Pails turned professional at the end of 1947. He played on the pro tour off and on for many years. Pails reached as high as world No. 6 in the 1947 amateur rankings, and Bud Collins ranked him the world No. 4 pro in 1948.

According to the tour promoter Jack Kramer, Pails beat Pancho Segura 41 to 31 matches in the 1948 tour, "but that was when Sego was still learning how to play fast surfaces." Kramer beat Pails "55 times with 1 draw, but somehow we were able to forget that off the court."

In November and December 1950, Pails won a four-man tour of New Zealand against Pancho Gonzales, Don Budge, and Frank Parker.

== Grand Slam finals ==
=== Singles (1 title, 1 runner-up) ===
Result	Year	Championship	Surface	Opponent	Score
Loss	1946	Australian Championships	Grass	(Australia) John Bromwich	7–5, 3–6, 5–7, 6–3, 2–6
Win	1947	Australian Championships	Grass	(Australia) John Bromwich	4–6, 6–4, 3–6, 7–5, 8–6

=== Doubles (1 runner-up) ===
Result	Year	Championship	Surface	Partner	Opponents	Score
Loss	1946	Wimbledon	Grass	(Australia) Geoff Brown	(United States) Tom Brown (United States) Jack Kramer	4–6, 4–6, 2–6
