= Leonard Schwartz (tennis) =

Australian tennis player

Len Schwartz
- Country (sports): Australia
- Born: 23 April 1913 Tanunda, South Australia, Australia
- Died: 23 November 2010 (aged 97) Adelaide, South Australia, Australia

Grand Slam singles results
- Australian Open: QF (1937, 1938)
- US Open: 2R (1938)

Grand Slam doubles results
- Australian Open: F (1946)

Grand Slam mixed doubles results
- Australian Open: QF (1933, 1937)

Leonard Schwartz (23 April 1913 – 23 November 2010) was an Australian amateur tennis player in the 1930s.

He reached the quarterfinals of the 1937 and 1938 Australian Championships. In doubles, Schwartz reached the final of the 1946 Australian Championships (partnering Max Newcombe).

Schwartz was a member of the Australian Davis Cup team in the 1938 semifinal tie against Mexico and won his singles match against Daniel Hernández.

== Grand Slam finals ==
=== Doubles: 1 runner-up ===
Result	Year	Championship	Surface	Partner	Opponents	Score
Loss	1946	Australian Championships	Grass	(Australia) Max Newcombe	(Australia) John Bromwich (Australia) Adrian Quist	3–6, 1–6, 7–9
