= May Hardcastle =

Australian tennis player (1913–2002)

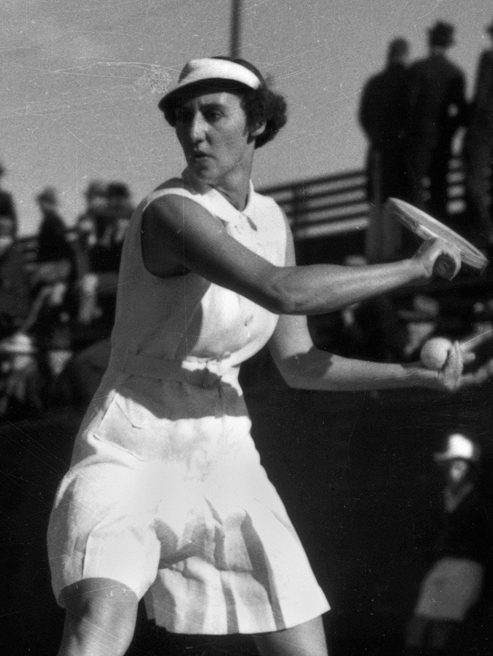
- Hardcastle in 1939
- Full name: Margaret May Hardcastle
- Country (sports): Australia
- Born: 6 May 1913 Brisbane, Queensland, Australia
- Died: 22 August 2002 (aged 89)
- Plays: Right-handed

Grand Slam singles results
- Australian Open: QF (1936, 1938, 1939, 1940)

Grand Slam doubles results
- Australian Open: F (1939)

Grand Slam mixed doubles results
- Australian Open: F (1940)

Margaret May Hardcastle (6 May 1913 – 22 August 2002) was an Australian tennis player of the 1930s and 1940s.

== Biography ==
Born in Brisbane, Queensland, Hardcastle was educated at Brisbane Girls Grammar School and later the Presbyterian Girls' College in Warwick. Following success at junior level, she competed at the Queensland Championships several times, winning on four occasions (1935, 1937, 1939 and 1940). She twice reached the final of the Australian Hard Court Championships in 1938 and 1939, winning the latter. Also in 1939, Hardcastle, in partnership with Emily Hood Westacott, reached the final of the women's doubles of the Australian Championships, losing to duo Thelma Coyne and Nancye Wynne. Additionally, she won the 1938–39 edition of the ladies' singles and mixed doubles at the New Zealand Championships.

In the early 1940s, during the Second World War, Hardcastle enlisted to the Australian Army Medical Women's Service. She later joined efforts at Morotai before transferring back to Australia upon the end of the war. She was discharged in April 1946. Her last recorded tennis match was in 1947. Hardcastle died in 2002 at the age of 89.

== Grand Slam finals ==
=== Doubles (1 runner-up) ===
Result	Year	Championship	Surface	Partner	Opponents	Score
Loss	1939	Australian Championships	Grass	(Australia) Emily Hood Westacott	(Australia) Thelma Coyne (Australia) Nancye Wynne	5–7, 4–6
