= Colin Long (tennis) =

Australian tennis player (1918–2009)

- Full name: Colin Foster Long
- Country (sports): Australia
- Born: 3 March 1918; Melbourne, Australia
- Died: 8 November 2009 (aged 91)

Singles

Grand Slam singles results
- Australian Open: QF (1947, 1948, 1949, 1950)
- Wimbledon: 4R (1947)
- US Open: 4R (1947)

Doubles

Grand Slam doubles results
- Australian Open: F (1939, 1948)
- Wimbledon: SF (1947)

Grand Slam mixed doubles results
- Australian Open: W (1940, 1946, 1947, 1948)
- Wimbledon: F (1947)

Colin Long (3 March 1918 – 8 November 2009) was an Australian tennis player. He had a notable mixed doubles partnership with fellow Australian Nancye Wynne Bolton. Together they won four Mixed Doubles (1940, 1946, 1947 and 1948) at the Australian Championships, which is an all-time record. In singles, he reached the quarterfinals of the Australian four times (1947, 1948, 1949 and 1950) and the fourth round of both Wimbledon and the U.S. Nationals in 1947. He was a major commentator for Channel 7 for both golf and tennis until the late 1980s.

== Life outside tennis ==
Long was born in Melbourne and attended Melbourne Grammar School, where he was school captain in 1937. He was a lieutenant in the AIF in World War II, serving in the Middle East.

He worked for Dunlop Sport before joining Spalding, where he became deputy chief executive. He appeared as a commentator on Seven Network tennis telecasts in the 1960s and 1970s and also commentated on golf up until the late 1980s alongside Peter Alliss.

In 1943, he married Florence Pelling. She survived him, along with their son and daughter.

== Grand Slam finals ==
=== Doubles: 2 (2 runner-ups) ===
Result	Year	Championship	Surface	Partner	Opponents	Score
Loss	1939	Australian Championships	Grass	(Australia) Don Turnbull	(Australia) John Bromwich (Australia) Adrian Quist	4–6, 5–7, 2–6
Loss	1948	Australian Championships	Grass	(Australia) Frank Sedgman	(Australia) John Bromwich (Australia) Adrian Quist	6–1, 8–6, 7–9, 3–6, 6–8

=== Mixed doubles: 6 (4 titles, 2 runner-ups) ===
Result	Year	Championship	Surface	Partner	Opponents	Score
Loss	1938	Australian Championships	Grass	(Australia) Nancye Wynne Bolton	(Australia) Margaret Wilson (Australia) John Bromwich	3–6, 2–6
Win	1940	Australian Championships	Grass	(Australia) Nancye Wynne Bolton	(Australia) Nell Hall Hopman (Australia) Harry Hopman	7–5, 2–6, 6–4
Win	1946	Australian Championships	Grass	(Australia) Nancye Wynne Bolton	(Australia) Joyce Fitch (Australia) John Bromwich	6–0, 6–4
Loss	1947	Wimbledon Championships	Grass	(Australia) Nancye Wynne Bolton	(United States) Louise Brough (Australia) John Bromwich	6–1, 4–6, 2–6
Win	1947	Australian Championships	Grass	(Australia) Nancye Wynne Bolton	(Australia) Joyce Fitch (Australia) John Bromwich	6–3, 6–3
Win	1948	Australian Championships	Grass	(Australia) Nancye Wynne Bolton	(Australia) Thelma Coyne Long (Australia) Bill Sidwell	7–5, 4–6, 8–6
