= Nell Hall Hopman =

Australian tennis player

Nell Hall Hopman, CBE
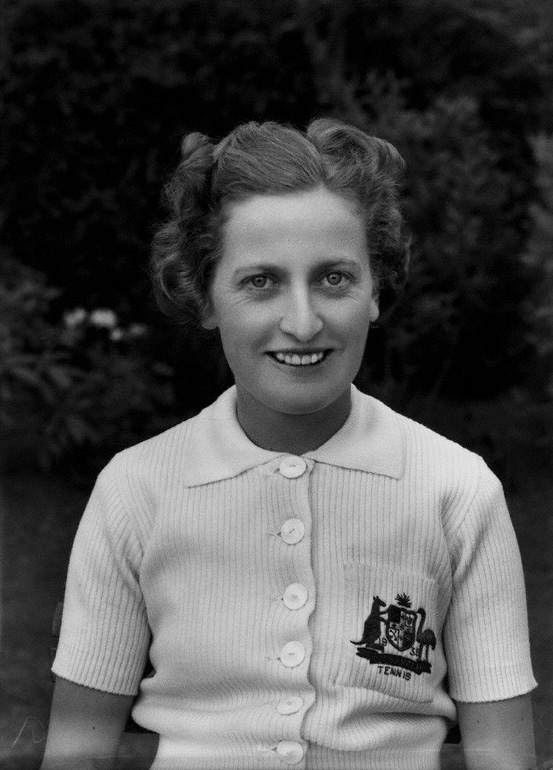
- Full name: Eleanor Mary Hall Hopman
- Country (sports): Australia
- Born: 9 March 1909 Sydney
- Died: 10 January 1968 (aged 58) Hawthorn, Victoria
- Retired: 1966

Grand Slam singles results
- Australian Open: F (1939, 1947)
- French Open: 3R (1938)
- Wimbledon: 3R (1934, 1952, 1953)
- US Open: 3R (1938)

Grand Slam doubles results
- Australian Open: F (1935, 1937, 1955)
- French Open: W (1954)
- Wimbledon: QF (1935, 1947)

Grand Slam mixed doubles results
- Australian Open: W (1930, 1936, 1937, 1939)
- Wimbledon: F (1935)

Eleanor "Nell" Mary Hall Hopman, CBE (née Hall; 9 March 1909 – 10 January 1968) was one of the female tennis players that dominated Australian tennis from 1930 through the early 1960s. She was the first wife of Harry Hopman, the coach and captain of 22 Australian Davis Cup teams.

== Early life ==
Hopman was born on 9 March 1909 at Coogee, Sydney and was the only daughter and second of three children of Charles Ernest Hall, clerk, and Mabel Gertrude, née Tipper. She was educated at Claremont College, Randwick and as a student she excelled at tennis and music. She obtaining her licentiate and teaching diploma at the Royal College of Music, London, and received a scholarship in 1928 but instead elected to pursue a tennis career.

== Career ==
Hopman teamed with her husband to win four mixed-doubles titles at the Australian Championships (1930, 1936, 1937, and 1939). They were mixed-doubles finalists at Wimbledon in 1935, losing to Fred Perry and Dorothy Round Little in three sets.

Hopman was a singles finalist at the Australian Championships in 1939 and 1947. She partnered with Maureen Connolly to win the women's doubles title at the 1954 French Championships. She played in 58 Grand Slam singles events during her career, the last one a first-round loss at the 1966 French Championships when she was 57 years old. She played in 27 of the 28 singles events that were held at the Australian Championships from 1930 through 1962, including 25 consecutive events from 1933 through 1962. Her last Grand Slam event was the women's doubles tournament at the 1966 US Championships, where she and Mrs. Arklay Richards lost in the first round.

Hopman was instrumental in Tennis Australia's decision to invite the reigning Wimbledon champion, Louise Brough Clapp, and Doris Hart to play tournaments in Australia in the summer of 1949–1950. She also arranged for Connolly and the American junior title holder Julie Sampson Haywood to play in Australia in the summer of 1952–1953. The result was Tennis Australia's decision to establish a committee to discuss ways and means of improving the "poor standards of Australian women's tennis". Other tennis writers supported Hopman's efforts, accusing Tennis Australia of a "parochial attitude to women players". In 1955, Tennis Australia finally sent a women's team abroad, under the management of Adrian Quist. In 1961, Hopman took another women's team abroad, consisting of Margaret Court, Lesley Turner Bowrey, and Mary Carter Reitano. The tour was a financial success, but Hopman was accused of overworking and underfeeding her players and forcing them to stay in inadequate hotels. As a result, Court refused to participate in the 1962 overseas tour led by Hopman.

Hopman was employed by the United States Lawn Tennis Association and the Southern California Tennis Association from 1952 through 1954 to be the travelling companion and chaperon of Connolly. In 1962, she persuaded the International Tennis Federation to begin sponsoring the Federation Cup, now known as the Fed Cup, an international team event for women similar to the Davis Cup for men.

She was awarded the CBE in July 1962.

Hopman became the first life member of "Tennis Victoria" in 1965 but the following year underwent unsuccessful surgery for a brain tumor and died in January 1968.

== Grand Slam tournament finals ==
=== Singles: 2 (2 runner-ups) ===
Result	Year	Championship	Surface	Opponent	Score
Loss	1939	Australian Championships	Grass	(Australia) Emily Hood Westacott	1–6, 2–6
Loss	1947	Australian Championships	Grass	(Australia) Nancye Wynne Bolton	3–6, 2–6

=== Doubles: 4 (1 title, 3 runner-ups) ===
Result	Year	Championship	Surface	Partner	Opponents	Score
Loss	1935	Australian Championships	Grass	(Australia) Louise Bickerton	(United Kingdom) Evelyn Dearman (United Kingdom) Nancy Lyle	3–6, 4–6
Loss	1937	Australian Championships	Grass	(Australia) Emily Hood Westacott	(Australia) Thelma Coyne Long (Australia) Nancye Wynne Bolton	2–6, 2–6
Win	1954	French Championships	Clay	(United States) Maureen Connolly	(France) Maud Galtier (France) Suzanne Schmitt	7–5, 4–6, 6–0
Loss	1955	Australian Championships	Grass	(Australia) Gwen Thiele	(Australia) Mary Bevis Hawton (Australia) Beryl Penrose	5–7, 1–6

=== Mixed doubles: 6 (4 titles, 2 runner-ups) ===
Result	Year	Championship	Surface	Partner	Opponents	Score
Win	1930	Australian Championships	Grass	(Australia) Harry Hopman	(Australia) Marjorie Cox Crawford (Australia) Jack Crawford	11–9, 3–6, 6–3
Loss	1935	Wimbledon Championships	Grass	(Australia) Harry Hopman	(United Kingdom) Dorothy Round (United Kingdom) Fred Perry	5–7, 6–4, 2–6
Win	1936	Australian Championships	Grass	(Australia) Harry Hopman	(Australia) May Blick (Australia) Abe Kay	6–2, 6–0
Win	1937	Australian Championships	Grass	(Australia) Harry Hopman	(Australia) Dorothy Stevenson (Australia) Don Turnbull	3–6, 6–3, 6–2
Win	1939	Australian Championships	Grass	(Australia) Harry Hopman	(Australia) Margaret Wilson (Australia) John Bromwich	6–8, 6–2, 6–3
Loss	1940	Australian Championships	Grass	(Australia) Harry Hopman	(Australia) Nancye Wynne Bolton (Australia) Colin Long	5–7, 6–2, 4–6

== Grand Slam singles performance timeline ==
Key
W	F	SF	QF	#R	RR	Q#	DNQ	A	NH

(W) winner; (F) finalist; (SF) semifinalist; (QF) quarterfinalist; (#R) rounds 4, 3, 2, 1; (RR) round-robin stage; (Q#) qualification round; (DNQ) did not qualify; (A) absent; (NH) not held; (SR) strike rate (events won / competed); (W–L) win–loss record.

Tournament	1930	1931	1932	1933	1934	1935	1936	1937	1938	1939	1940	1941	1942	1943	1944	1945	1946^{1}	1947^{1}	1948	1949	1950	1951	1952	1953	1954	1955	1956	1957	1958	1959	1960	1961	1962	1963	1964	1965	1966	Career SR
Australian Championships	1R	1R	A	QF	QF	SF	QF	2R	SF	F	SF	NH	NH	NH	NH	NH	QF	F	QF	2R	QF	QF	2R	2R	QF	QF	2R	2R	1R	2R	1R	2R	2R	A	A	A	A	0 / 27
French Championships	A	A	A	A	1R	2R	A	A	3R	A	NH	R	R	R	R	R	A	A	A	A	A	A	1R	1R	1R	2R	1R	A	A	1R	A	1R	2R	A	A	A	1R	0 / 12
Wimbledon Championships	A	A	A	A	3R	2R	A	A	1R	A	NH	NH	NH	NH	NH	NH	A	4R	A	A	A	A	3R	3R	1R	2R	2R	A	A	2R	A	1R	A	A	A	A	A	0 / 11
US Championships	A	A	A	A	A	A	A	A	3R	A	A	A	A	A	A	A	A	2R	A	A	A	A	A	2R	2R	2R	1R	A	A	2R	A	A	2R	A	A	A	A	0 / 8
Strike rate	0 / 1	0 / 1	0 / 0	0 / 1	0 / 3	0 / 3	0 / 1	0 / 1	0 / 4	0 / 1	0 / 1	0 / 0	0 / 0	0 / 0	0 / 0	0 / 0	0 / 1	0 / 3	0 / 1	0 / 1	0 / 1	0 / 1	0 / 3	0 / 4	0 / 4	0 / 4	0 / 4	0 / 1	0 / 1	0 / 4	0 / 1	0 / 3	0 / 3	0 / 0	0 / 0	0 / 0	0 / 1	0 / 58

R = tournament restricted to French nationals and held under German occupation.

^{1}In 1946 and 1947, the French Championships were held after Wimbledon.

== See also ==
- Performance timelines for all female tennis players since 1978 who reached at least one Grand Slam final
