= Nancye Wynne Bolton =

Australian tennis player (1916–2001)

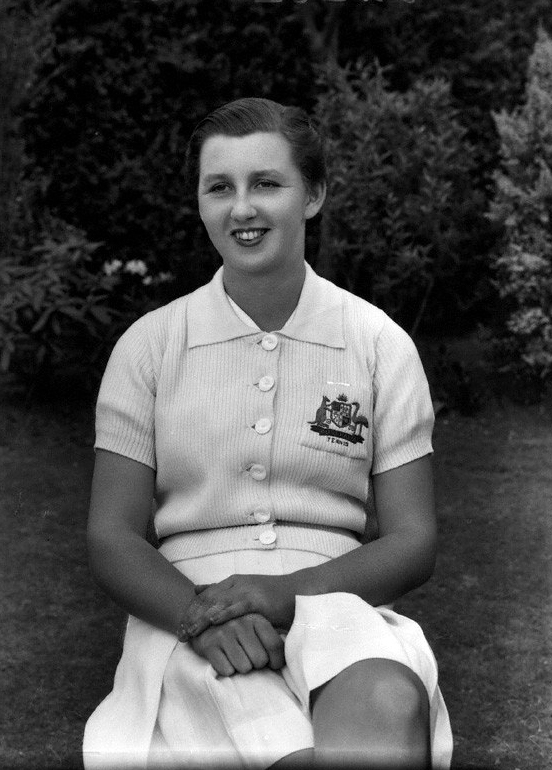
- Country (sports): Australia
- Born: 2 December 1916 Melbourne, Australia
- Died: 9 November 2001 (aged 84) Melbourne, Australia
- Height: 1.78 m (5 ft 10 in)
- Plays: Right-handed
- Int. Tennis HoF: 2006 (member page)

Singles

Grand Slam singles results
- Australian Open: W (1937, 1940, 1946, 1947, 1948, 1951)
- French Open: 3R (1938)
- Wimbledon: QF (1947)
- US Open: F (1938)

Doubles

Grand Slam doubles results
- Australian Open: W (1936, 1937, 1938, 1939, 1940, 1947, 1948, 1949, 1951, 1952)

Mixed doubles

Grand Slam mixed doubles results
- Australian Open: W (1940, 1946, 1947, 1948)
- French Open: F (1938)
- Wimbledon: F (1947, 1951)

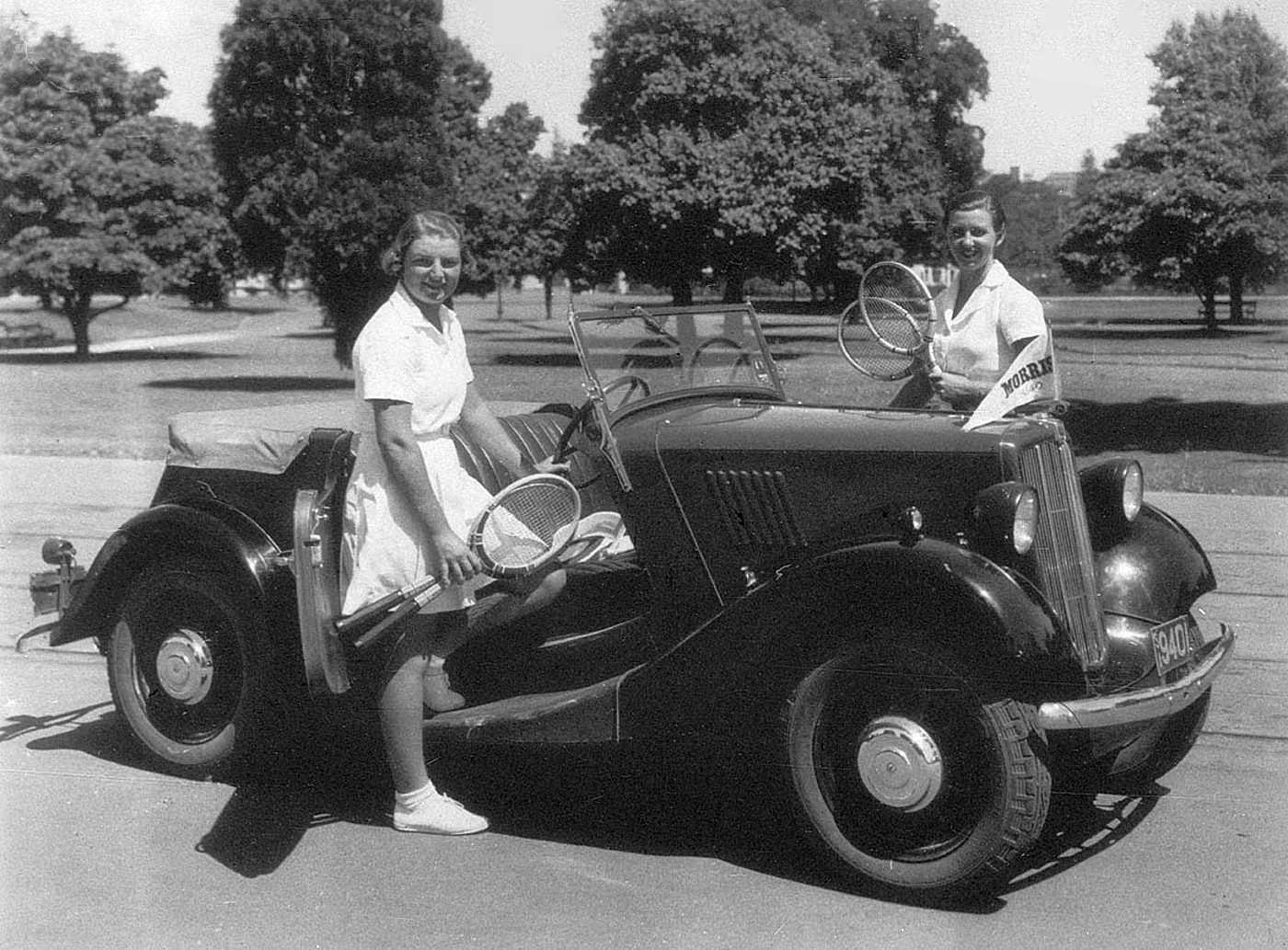
Thelma Coyne (l) and Nancye Wynne (r) in Adelaide (1938)

Nancye Wynne Bolton (née Wynne; 2 December 1916 – 9 November 2001) was an Australian tennis player. She won the women's singles title six times at the Australian Championships, third only to Margaret Court's and Serena Williams' 11 and 7 titles respectively. Bolton won 20 titles at the Australian Championships, second only to Court's 23 titles.

According to Wallis Myers and John Orloff of The Daily Telegraph and the Daily Mail, Bolton was ranked in the world top ten in 1938, 1947, and 1948 (no rankings issued from 1940 through 1945), reaching a career high of World No. 4 in those rankings in 1947 and 1948. According to Ned Potter of American Lawn Tennis magazine, Bolton was the second ranked player in 1947, behind Louise Brough.

She married George Bolton on 6 July 1940. He was a RAAF pilot and was killed in May 1942 during a raid on Germany.

Bolton was inducted into the International Tennis Hall of Fame in 2004.

== Grand Slam tournament finals ==
=== Singles: 9 (6 titles, 3 runner-ups) ===
Result	Year	Championship	Surface	Opponent	Score
Loss	1936	Australian Championships	Grass	(Australia) Joan Hartigan	4–6, 4–6
Win	1937	Australian Championships	Grass	(Australia) Emily Hood Westacott	6–3, 5–7, 6–4
Loss	1938	US Championships	Grass	(United States) Alice Marble	0–6, 3–6
Win	1940	Australian Championships	Grass	(Australia) Thelma Coyne Long	5–7, 6–4, 6–0
Win	1946	Australian Championships	Grass	(Australia) Joyce Fitch	6–4, 6–4
Win	1947	Australian Championships	Grass	(Australia) Nell Hall Hopman	6–3, 6–2
Win	1948	Australian Championships	Grass	(Australia) Marie Toomey	6–3, 6–1
Loss	1949	Australian Championships	Grass	(United States) Doris Hart	3–6, 4–6
Win	1951	Australian Championships	Grass	(Australia) Thelma Coyne Long	6–1, 7–5

=== Doubles: 12 (10 titles, 2 runner-ups) ===
Result	Year	Championship	Surface	Partner	Opponents	Score
Win	1936	Australian Championships	Grass	(Australia) Thelma Coyne Long	(Australia) May Blik (Australia) Katherine Woodward	6–2, 6–4
Win	1937	Australian Championships	Grass	(Australia) Thelma Coyne Long	(Australia) Nell Hall Hopman (Australia) Emily Hood Westacott	6–2, 6–2
Win	1938	Australian Championships	Grass	(Australia) Thelma Coyne Long	(United States) Dorothy Bundy Cheney (United States) Dorothy Workman	9–7, 6–4
Win	1939	Australian Championships	Grass	(Australia) Thelma Coyne Long	(Australia) May Hardcastle (Australia) Nell Hall Hopman	7–5, 6–4
Win	1940	Australian Championships	Grass	(Australia) Thelma Coyne Long	(Australia) Joan Hartigan (Australia) Emily Niemayer	7–5, 6–2
Loss	1946	Australian Championships	Grass	(Australia) Thelma Coyne Long	(Australia) Joyce Fitch (Australia) Mary Bevis Hawton	7–9, 4–6
Win	1947	Australian Championships	Grass	(Australia) Thelma Coyne Long	(Australia) Joyce Fitch (Australia) Mary Bevis Hawton	6–3, 6–3
Win	1948	Australian Championships	Grass	(Australia) Thelma Coyne Long	(Australia) Pat Jones (Australia) Mary Bevis Hawton	6–3, 6–3
Win	1949	Australian Championships	Grass	(Australia) Thelma Coyne Long	(United States) Doris Hart (Australia) Marie Toomey	6–0, 6–1
Loss	1950	Australian Championships	Grass	(Australia) Thelma Coyne Long	(United States) Louise Brough (United States) Doris Hart	2–6, 6–2, 3–6
Win	1951	Australian Championships	Grass	(Australia) Thelma Coyne Long	(Australia) Joyce Fitch (Australia) Mary Bevis Hawton	6–2, 6–1
Win	1952	Australian Championships	Grass	(Australia) Thelma Coyne Long	(Australia) Allison Burton Baker (Australia) Mary Bevis Hawton	6–1, 6–1

=== Mixed doubles: 8 (4 titles, 4 runner-ups) ===
Result	Year	Championship	Surface	Partner	Opponents	Score
Loss	1938	French Championships	Clay	(France) Christian Boussus	(France) Simonne Mathieu (Socialist Federal Republic of Yugoslavia) Dragutin Mitić	6–2, 3–6, 4–6
Loss	1938	Australian Championships	Grass	(Australia) Colin Long	(Australia) Margaret Wilson (Australia) John Bromwich	3–6, 2–6
Win	1940	Australian Championships	Grass	(Australia) Colin Long	(Australia) Nell Hall Hopman (Australia) Harry Hopman	7–5, 2–6, 6–4
Win	1946	Australian Championships	Grass	(Australia) Colin Long	(Australia) Joyce Fitch (Australia) John Bromwich	6–0, 6–4
Loss	1947	Wimbledon Championships	Grass	(Australia) Colin Long	(United States) Louise Brough (Australia) John Bromwich	6–1, 4–6, 2–6
Win	1947	Australian Championships	Grass	(Australia) Colin Long	(Australia) Joyce Fitch (Australia) John Bromwich	6–3, 6–3
Win	1948	Australian Championships	Grass	(Australia) Colin Long	(Australia) Thelma Coyne Long (Australia) Bill Sidwell	7–5, 4–6, 8–6
Loss	1951	Wimbledon Championships	Grass	(Australia) Mervyn Rose	(United States) Doris Hart (Australia) Frank Sedgman	5–7, 2–6

== Grand Slam singles tournament timeline ==
Key
W	F	SF	QF	#R	RR	Q#	DNQ	A	NH

(W) winner; (F) finalist; (SF) semifinalist; (QF) quarterfinalist; (#R) rounds 4, 3, 2, 1; (RR) round-robin stage; (Q#) qualification round; (DNQ) did not qualify; (A) absent; (NH) not held; (SR) strike rate (events won / competed); (W–L) win–loss record.

Tournament	1935	1936	1937	1938	1939	1940	1941–1944	1945	1946 (Note: In 1946 and 1947, the French Championships were held after Wimbledon.)	1947	1948	1949	1950	1951	1952	SR	W–L	Win %
Australian Championships	2R	F	W	SF	2R	W	NH	NH	W	W	W	F	SF	W	SF	6 / 13	44–7	86.3
French Championships	A	A	A	3R	A	NH	R (Note: Tournament restricted to French nationals and held under German occupation.)	A	A	A	A	A	A	A	A	0 / 1	1–1	50.0
Wimbledon	A	A	A	4R	A	NH	NH	NH	A	QF	A	A	A	3R	A	0 / 3	7–3	70.0
U.S. Championships	A	A	A	F	A	A	A	A	A	SF	A	A	A	A	A	0 / 2	7–2	77.8
Win–loss	1–1	4–1	4–0	10–4	0–1	4–0	–	–	5–0	11–2	4–0	3–1	3–1	7–1	3–1	6 / 19	59–13	81.9

== See also ==
- Performance timelines for all female tennis players since 1978 who reached at least one Grand Slam final
