= John Bromwich =

Australian tennis player (1918–1999)

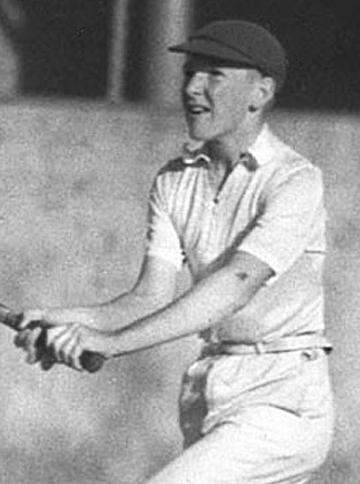
- Bromwich in the 1930s
- Full name: John Edward Bromwich
- Country (sports): Australia
- Born: 14 November 1918; Sydney, New South Wales, Australia
- Died: 21 October 1999 (aged 80); Geelong, Victoria, Australia
- Height: 1.78 m (5 ft 10 in)
- Turned pro: 1934 (amateur tour)
- Retired: 1954
- Plays: Left-handed (two-handed backhand, right-handed serve)
- Int. Tennis HoF: 1984 (member page)

Singles
- Career record: 480-90 (84.2%)
- Career titles: 54
- Highest ranking: No. 3 (1938, A. Wallis Myers)

Grand Slam singles results
- Australian Open: W (1939, 1946)
- French Open: QF (1950)
- Wimbledon: F (1948)
- US Open: SF (1938, 1939, 1947)

Doubles

Grand Slam doubles results
- Australian Open: W (1938, 1939, 1940, 1946, 1947, 1948, 1949, 1950)
- Wimbledon: W (1948, 1950)
- US Open: W (1939, 1949, 1950)

Grand Slam mixed doubles results
- Australian Open: W (1938)
- Wimbledon: W (1947, 1948)
- US Open: W (1947)

John Edward Bromwich (14 November 1918 – 21 October 1999) was an Australian tennis player who, along with fellow countryman Vivian McGrath, was one of the first great players to use a two-handed backhand. He was a natural left-hander, though hit his serve with his right hand. Bromwich twice won the Australian Championships singles title, in 1939 (over Adrian Quist in a straight sets final) and in 1946 (a five-set final victory over Dinny Pails). He was ranked world No. 3 by A. Wallis Myers in 1938 and again by Harry Hopman in 1947.

== Tennis career ==
Although a fine singles player, Bromwich was primarily known as being a world-class doubles player, winning 13 men's doubles titles and 4 mixed doubles titles in the majors. Tennis great (and near contemporary) Jack Kramer writes in his 1979 autobiography that if "Earth were playing in the all-time Universe Davis Cup, I'd play Budge and Vines in my singles, and Budge and Bromwich in the doubles. That's what I think of Johnny as a doubles player."

In the 1939 Davis Cup final, just as World War II was starting, Bromwich played arguably the match of his life in beating the American, Frank Parker, in straight sets, to clinch the Cup for Australia. Australia had trailed 0–2 after the first day, and came back to win the tie, 3–2. This remains the only time in Davis Cup history where the winning team has won a Davis Cup final after trailing 0–2.

In 1948, Bromwich played the American Bob Falkenburg in the Wimbledon final, and had a championship point at 5–3 in the fifth set. He came to the net for a volley but decided that Falkenburg's ball would go long and let it go by. It landed on the baseline and Falkenburg fought his way back into the match. Bromwich later had another two championship points, but was unable to take those either, and Falkenburg came back to win the championship, taking the last four games to win the fifth set, 7–5. Kramer later wrote that "...it never seemed to me that he was the same player after that. He doubted himself. He was a precision player to start with – he used a terribly light racket weighing less than twelve ounces, and it was strung loosely. He could put a ball on a dime, and I suppose after he misjudged that one shot, the most important in his life, he never possessed the confidence he needed." Bromwich also had a championship point in losing the 1947 Australian Championships singles final to Dinny Pails.

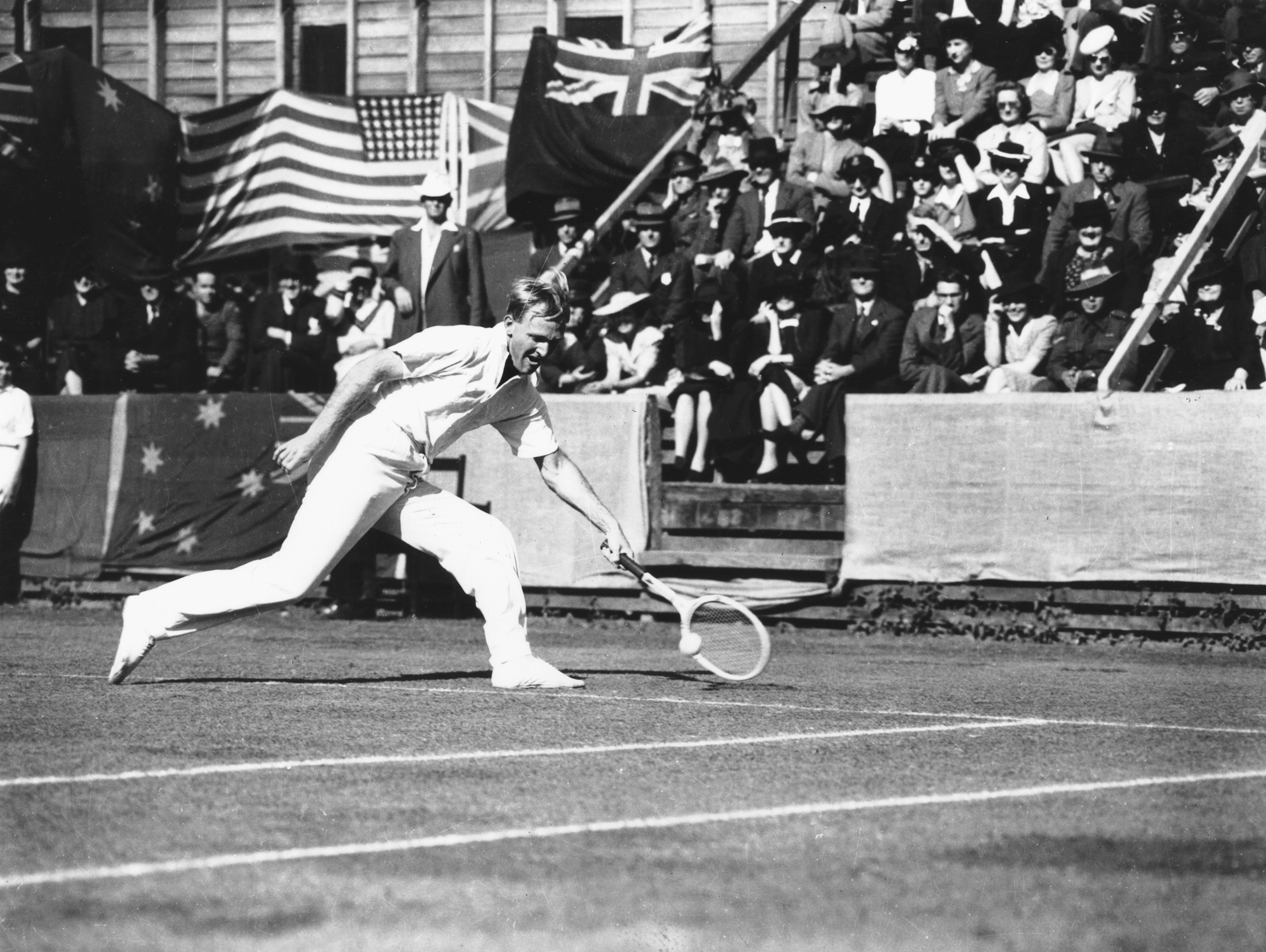
John Bromwich in a 1944 exhibition match against Dinny Pails

Bromwich gained some revenge against Falkenburg in the 1949 Wimbledon quarterfinals, coming back from two sets down to win in five sets. Bromwich then lost to Jaroslav Drobný in the semifinals.

Writing about Bromwich, Kramer says, "Bromwich was like McMillan today because as a kid John hit from both sides two-handed, and while he eventually had given up the two-handed forehand, he still hit backhand two-handed and could anything back from the baseline. He had strokes very much like Connors."

Bromwich was inducted into the International Tennis Hall of Fame in Newport, Rhode Island in 1984. He received a posthumous Davis Cup commitment award in 2017 which was presented to his wife by the ITF and Tennis Australia.

== Grand Slam finals ==
=== Singles (2 wins, 6 losses) ===
| Result | Year | Championship | Surface | Opponent | Score |
|---|---|---|---|---|---|
| Loss | 1937 | Australian Championships | Grass | (Australia) Vivian McGrath | 3–6, 6–1, 0–6, 6–2, 1–6 |
| Loss | 1938 | Australian Championships | Grass | (United States) Don Budge | 4–6, 2–6, 1–6 |
| Win | 1939 | Australian Championships | Grass | (Australia) Adrian Quist | 6–4, 6–1, 6–3 |
| Win | 1946 | Australian Championships | Grass | (Australia) Dinny Pails | 5–7, 6–3, 7–5, 3–6, 6–2 |
| Loss | 1947 | Australian Championships | Grass | (Australia) Dinny Pails | 6–4, 4–6, 6–3, 5–7, 6–8 |
| Loss | 1948 | Australian Championships | Grass | (Australia) Adrian Quist | 4–6, 6–3, 3–6, 6–2, 3–6 |
| Loss | 1948 | Wimbledon | Grass | (United States) Bob Falkenburg | 5–7, 6–0, 2–6, 6–3, 5–7 |
| Loss | 1949 | Australian Championships | Grass | (Australia) Frank Sedgman | 3–6, 2–6, 2–6 |

=== Doubles: (13 wins, 3 losses) ===
| Result | Year | Championship | Surface | Partner | Opponents | Score |
|---|---|---|---|---|---|---|
| Loss | 1937 | Australian Championships | Grass | (Australia) Jack Harper | (Australia) Adrian Quist (Australia) Don Turnbull | 2–6, 7–9, 6–1, 8–6, 4–6 |
| Win | 1938 | Australian Championships | Grass | (Australia) Adrian Quist | (Germany) Gottfried von Cramm (Germany) Henner Henkel | 7–5, 6–4, 6–0 |
| Loss | 1938 | U.S. Championships | Grass | (Australia) Adrian Quist | (United States) Don Budge (United States) Gene Mako | 3–6, 2–6, 1–6 |
| Win | 1939 | Australian Championships | Grass | (Australia) Adrian Quist | (Australia) Colin Long (Australia) Don Turnbull | 6–4, 7–5, 6–2 |
| Win | 1939 | U.S. Championships | Grass | (Australia) Adrian Quist | (Australia) Jack Crawford (Australia) Harry Hopman | 8–6, 6–1, 6–4 |
| Win | 1940 | Australian Championships | Grass | (Australia) Adrian Quist | (Australia) Jack Crawford (Australia) Vivian McGrath | 6–3, 7–5, 6–1 |
| Win | 1946 | Australian Championships | Grass | (Australia) Adrian Quist | (Australia) Max Newcombe (Australia) Leonard Schwartz | 6–3, 6–1, 9–7 |
| Win | 1947 | Australian Championships | Grass | (Australia) Adrian Quist | (Australia) Frank Sedgman (Australia) George Worthington | 6–1, 6–3, 6–1 |
| Win | 1948 | Australian Championships | Grass | (Australia) Adrian Quist | (Australia) Frank Sedgman (Australia) Colin Long | 1–6, 6–8, 9–7, 6–3, 8–6 |
| Win | 1948 | Wimbledon | Grass | (Australia) Frank Sedgman | (United States) Tom Brown (United States) Gardnar Mulloy | 5–7, 7–5, 7–5, 9–7 |
| Win | 1949 | Australian Championships | Grass | (Australia) Adrian Quist | (Australia) Geoffrey Brown (Australia) Bill Sidwell | 1–6, 7–5, 6–2, 6–3 |
| Win | 1949 | US National Championships | Grass | (Australia) Bill Sidwell | (Australia) Frank Sedgman (Australia) George Worthington | 6–4, 6–0, 6–1 |
| Win | 1950 | Australian Championships | Grass | (Australia) Adrian Quist | (Egypt) Jaroslav Drobný (South Africa) Eric Sturgess | 6–3, 5–7, 4–6, 6–3, 8–6 |
| Win | 1950 | Wimbledon Championships | Grass | (Australia) Adrian Quist | (Australia) Geoff Brown (Australia) Bill Sidwell | 7–5, 3–6, 6–3, 3–6, 6–2 |
| Win | 1950 | U.S. Championships | Grass | (Australia) Frank Sedgman | (United States) Gardnar Mulloy (Australia) Bill Talbert | 7–5, 8–6, 3–6, 6–1 |
| Loss | 1951 | Australian Championships | Grass | (Australia) Adrian Quist | (Australia) Frank Sedgman (Australia) Ken McGregor | 9–11, 6–2, 3–6, 6–4, 3–6 |

=== Mixed Doubles: 11 (4 wins, 7 losses) ===
| Result | Year | Championship | Surface | Partner | Opponents | Score |
|---|---|---|---|---|---|---|
| Win | 1938 | Australian Championships | Grass | (Australia) Margaret Wilson | (Australia) Nancye Wynne Bolton (Australia) Colin Long | 6–3, 6–2 |
| Loss | 1938 | U.S. Championships | Grass | (Australia) Thelma Coyne Long | (United States) Alice Marble (United States) Don Budge | 1–6, 2–6 |
| Loss | 1939 | Australian Championships | Grass | (Australia) Margaret Wilson | (Australia) Nell Hall Hopman (Australia) Harry Hopman | 8–6, 2–6, 3–6 |
| Loss | 1946 | Australian Championships | Grass | (Australia) Joyce Fitch | (Australia) Nancye Wynne Bolton (Australia) Colin Long | 0–6, 4–6 |
| Loss | 1947 | Australian Championships | Grass | (Australia) Joyce Fitch | (Australia) Nancye Wynne Bolton (Australia) Colin Long | 3–6, 3–6 |
| Win | 1947 | Wimbledon | Grass | (United States) Louise Brough | (Australia) Nancye Wynne Bolton (Australia) Colin Long | 1–6, 6–4, 6–2 |
| Win | 1947 | U.S. Championships | Grass | (United States) Louise Brough | (United States) Gussy Moran (United States) Pancho Segura | 6–3, 6–1 |
| Win | 1948 | Wimbledon | Grass | (United States) Louise Brough | (United States) Doris Hart (Australia) Frank Sedgman | 6–2, 3–6, 6–3 |
| Loss | 1949 | Australian Championships | Grass | (Australia) Joyce Fitch | (United States) Doris Hart (Australia) Frank Sedgman | 1–6, 7–5, 10–12 |
| Loss | 1949 | Wimbledon | Grass | (United States) Louise Brough | (South Africa) Sheila Summers (South Africa) Eric Sturgess | 7–9, 11–9, 5–7 |
| Loss | 1954 | Australian Championships | Grass | (Australia) Beryl Penrose | (Australia) Thelma Coyne Long (Australia) Rex Hartwig | 6–4, 1–6, 2–6 |

== Singles performance timeline ==
Key
| W | F | SF | QF | #R | RR | Q# | DNQ | A | NH |

(W) winner; (F) finalist; (SF) semifinalist; (QF) quarterfinalist; (#R) rounds 4, 3, 2, 1; (RR) round-robin stage; (Q#) qualification round; (DNQ) did not qualify; (A) absent; (NH) not held; (SR) strike rate (events won / competed); (W–L) win–loss record.

| Tournament | 1935 | 1936 | 1937 | 1938 | 1939 | 1940 | 1941 | 1942 | 1943 | 1944 | 1945 | 1946 | 1947 | 1948 | 1949 | 1950 | 1951 | 1952 | 1953 | 1954 | SR | W–L | Win % |
|---|---|---|---|---|---|---|---|---|---|---|---|---|---|---|---|---|---|---|---|---|---|---|---|
| Australian Open | 3R | QF | F | F | W | SF | Not held | | | | | W | F | F | F | QF | QF | A | A | SF | 2 / 13 | 44–11 | 80% |
| French Open | A | A | A | A | A | Not held | | | | | | A | A | A | A | QF | A | A | A | A | 0 / 1 | 4–1 | 80% |
| Wimbledon | A | A | 3R | A | A | Not held | | | | | | A | 4R | F | SF | 4R | A | A | A | A | 0 / 5 | 19–5 | 79% |
| US Open | A | A | A | SF | SF | A | A | A | A | A | A | A | SF | A | 3R | 3R | A | A | A | A | 0 / 5 | 16–5 | 76% |
| Win–loss | 2–1 | 2–1 | 6–2 | 8–2 | 9–1 | 3–1 | 0–0 | 0–0 | 0–0 | 0–0 | 0–0 | 5–0 | 11–3 | 10–2 | 11–3 | 11–4 | 2–1 | 0–0 | 0–0 | 3–1 | 2 / 24 | 83–22 | 79% |
