= Margaret Wilson (tennis) =

Australian tennis player

- Country (sports): Australia

Singles

Grand Slam singles results
- Australian Open: QF (1937)

Doubles

Grand Slam doubles results
- Australian Open: SF (1939)

Grand Slam mixed doubles results
- Australian Open: W (1938)

Margaret Wilson is an Australian former tennis player who was active in the 1930s.

Wilson won the mixed doubles title at the 1938 Australian Championships. Partnering with John Bromwich they defeated Nancye Wynne Bolton and Colin Long in the final in straight sets. The next year, 1939, they again reached the final but were defeated in three sets by compatriot husband and wife team Nell Hall Hopman and Harry Hopman.

== Grand Slam finals ==
=== Doubles (1 title, 1 runner-up) ===
Result	Year	Championship	Surface	Partner	Opponents	Score
Win	1938	Australian Championships	Grass	(Australia) John Bromwich	(Australia) Nancye Wynne Bolton (Australia) Colin Long	6–3, 6–2
Loss	1939	Australian Championships	Grass	(Australia) John Bromwich	(Australia) Nell Hall Hopman (Australia) Harry Hopman	8–6, 2–6, 3–6
