= Emily Hood Westacott =

Australian tennis player (1910–1980)

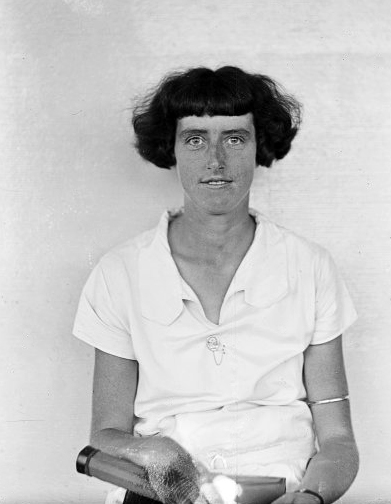
- Full name: Emily Jane Lucy Harding Hood
- Country (sports): Australia
- Born: 6 May 1910; Brisbane, Queensland, Australia
- Died: 9 October 1980 (aged 70)

Singles

Grand Slam singles results
- Australian Open: W (1939)

Doubles

Grand Slam doubles results
- Australian Open: W (1930, 1933, 1934)

Grand Slam mixed doubles results
- Australian Open: F (1931, 1934)

Emily Hood Westacott (née Hood; 6 May 1910– 9 October 1980), was an Australian female tennis player in the 1930s.

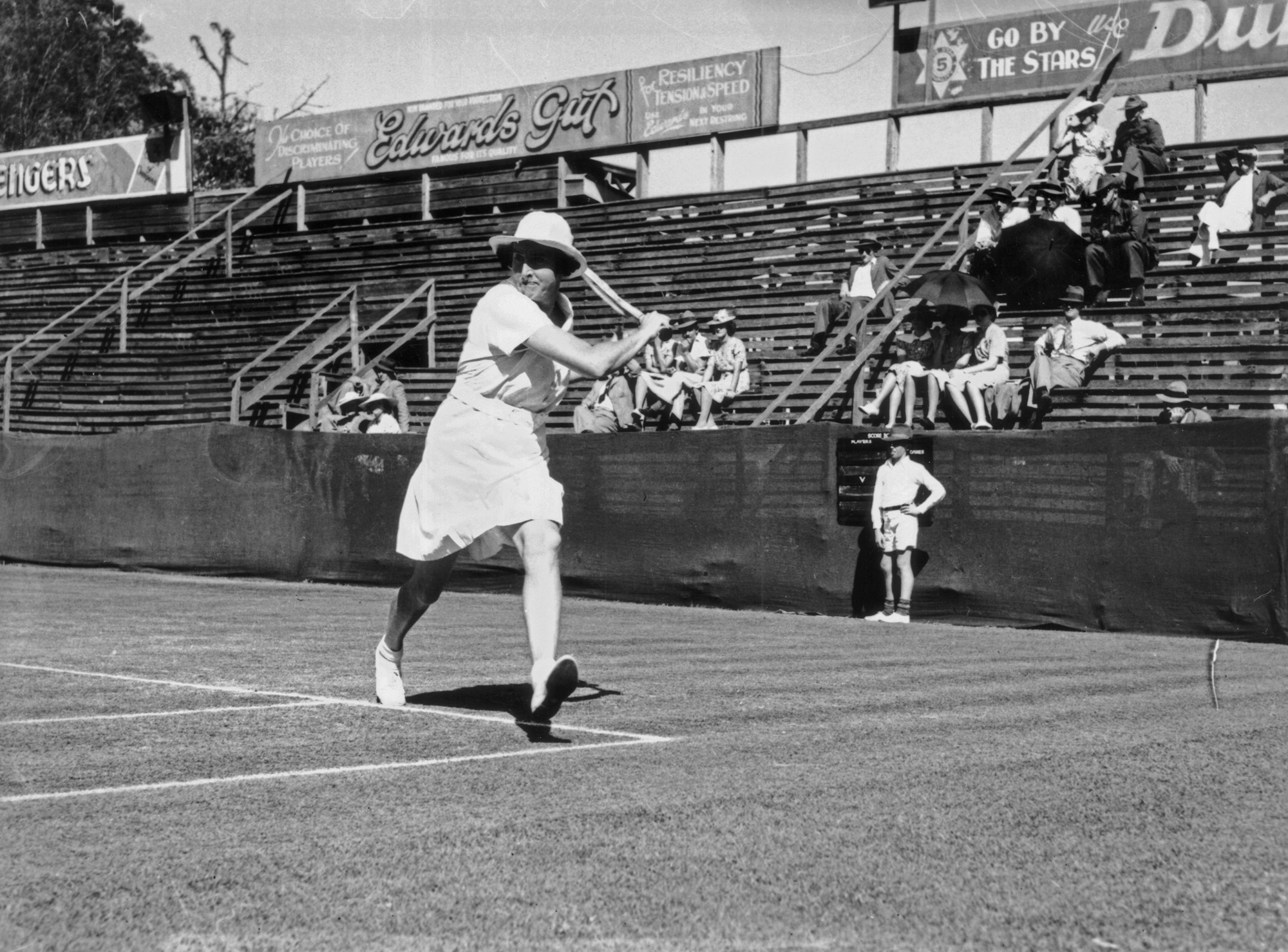
Emily Hood Westacott at the Milton Courts in Brisbane, Australia (1940)

In 1930 she won the national junior singles and doubles titles as well as the doubles title with Margaret Molesworth. Due to illness she played little tennis in 1935 and the first half of 1936.

She won the Australian Championship singles in 1939, defeating Nell Hopman in straight sets. In 1937 she was a finalist losing in the final to Nancye Wynne Bolton in three sets. Together with Margaret Molesworth, she won three women's doubles titles at the Australian Championships in 1930, 1933, and 1934.

In 1939 the Queensland Lawn Tennis Association proposed to send Westacott and May Hardcastle to the Wimbledon Championships, but Westacott declined due to illness of her mother.

She married Victor Clyde Westacott on 20 August 1930 at the Methodist Church in Brisbane.

== Grand Slam finals ==
=== Singles: 2 (1 titles, 1 runner-up) ===
Result	Year	Championship	Surface	Opponent	Score
Loss	1937	Australian Championships	Grass	(Australia) Nancye Wynne	3–6, 7–5, 4–6
Win	1939	Australian Championships	Grass	(Australia) Nell Hopman	6–1, 6–2

=== Doubles: 5 (3 titles, 2 runners-up) ===
Result	Year	Championship	Surface	Partner	Opponents	Score
Win	1930	Australian Championships	Grass	(Australia) Margaret Molesworth	(Australia) Marjorie Cox Crawford (Australia) Sylvia Lance Harper	6–3, 0–6, 7–5
Win	1933	Australian Championships	Grass	(Australia) Margaret Molesworth	(Australia) Joan Hartigan (United States) Marjorie Gladman	6–3, 6–2
Win	1934	Australian Championships	Grass	(Australia) Margaret Molesworth	(Australia) Joan Hartigan (Australia) Ula Valkenburg	6–8, 6–4, 6–4
Loss	1937	Australian Championships	Grass	(Australia) Nell Hopman	(Australia) Thelma Coyne (Australia) Nancye Wynne	2–6, 2–6
Loss	1939	Australian Championships	Grass	(Australia) May Hardcastle	(Australia) Thelma Coyne (Australia) Nancye Wynne	5–7, 4–6

=== Mixed doubles: 2 (2 runners-up) ===
Result	Year	Championship	Surface	Partner	Opponents	Score
Loss	1931	Australian Championships	Grass	(Australia) Aubrey Willard	(Australia) Marjorie Cox Crawford (Australia) Jack Crawford	5–7, 4–6
Loss	1934	Australian Championships	Grass	(Australia) Roy Dunlop	(Australia) Joan Hartigan (Australia) Edgar Moon	3–6, 4–6
