= 1935 in tennis =

This page covers all the important events in the sport of tennis in 1935. It provides the results of notable tournaments throughout the year on both the men's and women's ILTF tennis circuits.

== Australian Open ==
Category	Champion(s)	Finalist(s)	Score
Men's singles	(Australia) Jack Crawford	(United Kingdom) Fred Perry	2–6, 6–4, 6–4, 6–4
Women's singles	(United Kingdom) Dorothy Round	(United Kingdom) Nancy Lyle	1–6, 6–1, 6–3
Men's doubles	(Australia) Jack Crawford (Australia) Vivian McGrath	(United Kingdom) Pat Hughes (United Kingdom) Fred Perry	6–4, 8–6, 6–2
Women's doubles	(United Kingdom) Evelyn Dearman (United Kingdom) Nancy Lyle	(Australia) Louie Bickerton (Australia) Nell Hall Hopman	6–3, 6–4
Mixed doubles	(Australia) Louie Bickerton (France) Christian Boussus	(Australia) Birdie Bond (South Africa) Vernon Kirby	1–6, 6–3, 6–3

== French Open ==
Category	Champion(s)	Finalist(s)	Score
Men's singles	(United Kingdom) Fred Perry	(Germany) Gottfried von Cramm	6–3, 3–6, 6–1, 6–3
Women's singles	(Germany) Hilde Sperling	(France) Simonne Mathieu	6–2, 6–1
Men's doubles	(Australia) Jack Crawford (Australia) Adrian Quist	(Australia) Vivian McGrath (Australia) Don Turnbull	6–1, 6–4, 6–2
Women's doubles	(United Kingdom) Margaret Scriven (United Kingdom) Kay Stammers	(France) Ida Adamoff (Germany) Hilde Krahwinkel Sperling	6–4, 6–0
Mixed doubles	(France) Lolette Payot (France) Marcel Bernard	(France) Sylvie Jung Henrotin (France) André Martin-Legeay	4–6, 6–2, 6–4

== Wimbledon ==
Category	Champion(s)	Finalist(s)	Score
Men's singles	(United Kingdom) Fred Perry	(Germany) Gottfried von Cramm	6–2, 6–4, 6–4
Women's singles	(United States) Helen Moody	(United States) Helen Jacobs	6–3, 3–6, 7–5
Men's doubles	(Australia) Jack Crawford (Australia) Adrian Quist	(United States) Wilmer Allison (United States) John Van Ryn	6–3, 5–7, 6–2, 5–7, 7–5
Women's doubles	(United Kingdom) Freda James (United Kingdom) Kay Stammers	(France) Simonne Mathieu (Denmark) Hilde Sperling	6–1, 6–4
Mixed doubles	(United Kingdom) Fred Perry (United Kingdom) Dorothy Round	(Australia) Harry Hopman (Australia) Nell Hopman	7–5, 4–6, 6–2

== US Open ==
Category	Champion(s)	Finalist(s)	Score
Men's singles	(United States) Wilmer Allison	(United States) Sidney Wood	6–2, 6–2, 6–3
Women's singles	(United States) Helen Jacobs	(United States) Sarah Palfrey Cooke	6–2, 6–4
Men's doubles	(United States) Wilmer Allison (United States) John Van Ryn	(United States) Don Budge (United States) Gene Mako	6–2, 6–3, 2–6, 3–6, 6–1
Women's doubles	(United States) Helen Jacobs (United States) Sarah Palfrey Cooke	(United States) Carolin Babcock (United States) Dorothy Andrus	6–4, 6–2
Mixed doubles	(United States) Sarah Palfrey Cooke (Spain) Enrique Maier	(United Kingdom) Kay Stammers (Czechoslovakia) Roderich Menzel	6–4, 4–6, 6–3
