= 1929 in tennis =

This page covers all the important events in the sport of tennis in 1929. It provides the results of notable tournaments throughout the year on both the men's and women's ILTF tennis circuits.

== Australian Open ==
Category	Champion(s)	Finalist(s)	Score
Men's singles	(United Kingdom) Colin Gregory	(Australia) Bob Schlesinger	6–2, 6–2, 5–7, 7–5
Women's singles	(Australia) Daphne Akhurst	(Australia) Louie Bickerton	6–1, 5–7, 6–2
Men's doubles	(Australia) Jack Crawford (Australia) Harry Hopman	(Australia) Jack Cummings (Australia) Gar Moon	6–1, 6–8, 4–6, 6–1, 6–3
Women's doubles	(Australia) Daphne Akhurst (Australia) Louie Bickerton	(Australia) Sylvia Harper (Australia) Meryl O'Hara Wood	6–2, 3–6, 6–2
Mixed doubles	(Australia) Daphne Akhurst (Australia) Gar Moon	(Australia) Marjorie Cox (Australia) Jack Crawford	6–0, 7–5

== French Open ==
Category	Champion(s)	Finalist(s)	Score
Men's singles	(France) René Lacoste	(France) Jean Borotra	6–3, 2–6, 6–0, 2–6, 8–6
Women's singles	(United States) Helen Wills Moody	(France) Simonne Mathieu	6–3, 6–4
Men's doubles	(France) René Lacoste (France) Jean Borotra	(France) Henri Cochet (France) Jacques Brugnon	6–3, 3–6, 6–3, 3–6, 8–6
Women's doubles	(Spain) Lilí Álvarez (Netherlands) Kea Bouman	(South Africa) Bobbie Heine (South Africa) Alida Neave	7–5, 6–3
Mixed doubles	(United Kingdom) Eileen Bennett Whittingstall (France) Henri Cochet	(United States) Helen Wills Moody (United States) Frank Hunter	6–3, 6–2

== Wimbledon ==
Category	Champion(s)	Finalist(s)	Score
Men's singles	(France) Henri Cochet	(France) Jean Borotra	6–4, 6–3, 6–4
Women's singles	(United States) Helen Wills	(United States) Helen Jacobs	6–1, 6–2
Men's doubles	(United States) Wilmer Allison (United States) John Van Ryn	(United Kingdom) Ian Collins (United Kingdom) Colin Gregory	6–4, 5–7, 6–3, 10–12, 6–4
Women's doubles	(United Kingdom) Peggy Michell (United Kingdom) Phoebe Watson	(United Kingdom) Phyllis Covell (United Kingdom) Dorothy Shepherd-Barron	6–4, 8–6
Mixed doubles	(United States) Frank Hunter (United States) Helen Wills	(United Kingdom) Ian Collins (United Kingdom) Joan Fry	6–1, 6–4

== US Open ==
Category	Champion(s)	Finalist(s)	Score
Men's singles	(United States) Bill Tilden	(United States) Francis Hunter	3–6, 6–3, 4–6, 6–2, 6–4
Women's singles	(United States) Helen Wills	(United Kingdom) Phoebe Holcroft Watson	6–4, 6–2
Men's doubles	(United States) George Lott (United States) John Doeg	(United States) Berkeley Bell (United States) Lewis White	10–8, 16–14, 6–1
Women's doubles	(United Kingdom) Phoebe Holcroft Watson (United Kingdom) Peggy Michell	(United Kingdom) Phyllis Covell (United Kingdom) Dorothy Shepherd-Barron	2–6, 6–3, 6–4
Mixed doubles	(United Kingdom) Betty Nuthall (United States) George Lott	(United Kingdom) Phyllis Covell (United Kingdom) Bunny Austin	6–3, 6–3
