= 1929 in sports =

1929 in sports describes the year's events in world sport.

== American football ==
- NFL championship – Green Bay Packers (12–0–1)
- Rose Bowl (1928 season):
  - The Georgia Tech Yellow Jackets won 8–7 over the California Golden Bears to share the college football national championship
- Notre Dame Fighting Irish – college football national championship
- 28 November – Ernie Nevers scores 6 rushing touchdowns for Chicago Cardinals against Chicago Bears

== Association football ==
Ecuador

- Emelec of Guayaquil officially founded on April 28.

England

- The Football League – Sheffield Wednesday 52 points, Leicester City 51, Aston Villa 50, Sunderland 47, Liverpool 46, Derby County 46
- FA Cup final – Bolton Wanderers 2–0 Portsmouth at Empire Stadium, Wembley, London

Germany

- National Championship – SpVgg Fürth 3–2 Hertha BSC at Nuremberg

== Australian rules football ==
VFL Premiership

- Collingwood achieves the only perfect home-and-away season in VFL/AFL history, but lose the second semi-final to Richmond 8.13 (61) to 18.15 (123)
- Collingwood wins the 33rd VFL Premiership, beating Richmond 11.13 (79) to 7.8 (50) in the 1929 VFL Grand Final. This creates a still standing record of 4 Premierships in a row. Gordon Coventry (Collingwood) becomes the first player to kick more than 100 goals in a season (118)

Brownlow Medal

- The annual Brownlow Medal is awarded to Albert Collier (Collingwood)

== Bandy ==
Sweden

- Championship final – IF Göta 5-1 Västerås SK

== Baseball ==
- April 16 - New York Yankees become 1st team to use numbers on uniforms

World Series

- 8–14 October — Philadelphia Athletics (AL) defeat Chicago Cubs (NL) to win the 1929 World Series by 4 games to 1.

== Basketball ==
ABL Championship

- Cleveland Rosenblums over Fort Wayne Hoosiers (4–0)

Europe

- Italian club Virtus Bologna, officially founded.

France

- Limoges CSP, was founded in Nouvelle-Aquitaine, on November 13.

== Boxing ==
Events

- September — having successfully defended the World Light Heavyweight Championship this year against both Mickey Walker and James J. Braddock, Tommy Loughran relinquishes the title to fight as a heavyweight

Lineal world champions

- World Heavyweight Championship – vacant
- World Light Heavyweight Championship – Tommy Loughran → vacant
- World Middleweight Championship – Mickey Walker
- World Welterweight Championship – Joe Dundee → Jackie Fields
- World Lightweight Championship – Sammy Mandell
- World Featherweight Championship – Andre Routis → Bat Battalino
- World Bantamweight Championship – vacant → "Panama" Al Brown
- World Flyweight Championship – vacant

== Canadian football ==
Grey Cup

- 17th Grey Cup – Hamilton Tigers 14–3 Regina Roughriders

== Cricket ==
Events

- Marylebone Cricket Club (MCC) organises the England tour of Australia in the 1928–29 season. England retains The Ashes, winning the first four Tests against Australia and losing the last for a 4–1 series victory. But, ominously for England, a young batsman called Don Bradman makes his Test debut for Australia.

England

- County Championship – Nottinghamshire
- Minor Counties Championship – Oxfordshire
- Most runs – Frank Woolley 2804 @ 56.08 (HS 176)
- Most wickets – Tich Freeman 267 @ 18.27 (BB 10–131)
- Wisden Cricketers of the Year – Ted Bowley, K. S. Duleepsinhji, Tuppy Owen-Smith, Walter Robins, Bob Wyatt

Australia

- Sheffield Shield – New South Wales
- Most runs – Don Bradman 1690 @ 93.88 (HS 340*)
- Most wickets – Clarrie Grimmett 71 @ 34.25 (BB 6–109)

India

- Bombay Quadrangular – Parsees

New Zealand

- Plunket Shield – Auckland

South Africa

- Currie Cup – Western Province

West Indies

- Inter-Colonial Tournament – British Guiana

== Cycling ==
Tour de France

- Maurice De Waele (Belgium) wins the 23rd Tour de France

== Figure skating ==
World Figure Skating Championships

- World Men's Champion – Gillis Grafström (Sweden)
- World Women's Champion – Sonja Henie (Norway)
- World Pairs Champions – Lilly Scholz and Otto Kaiser (Austria)

== Golf ==
Major tournaments

- British Open – Walter Hagen
- US Open – Bobby Jones
- USPGA Championship – Leo Diegel

Other tournaments

- British Amateur – Cyril Tolley
- US Amateur – Jimmy Johnston

== Horse racing ==
England

- Champion Hurdle – Royal Falcon
- Cheltenham Gold Cup – Easter Hero
- Grand National – Gregalach
- 1,000 Guineas Stakes – Taj Mah
- 2,000 Guineas Stakes – Mr Jinks
- The Derby – Trigo
- The Oaks – Pennycomequick
- St. Leger Stakes – Trigo

Australia

- Melbourne Cup – Nightmarch

Canada

- King's Plate – Shorelint

France

- Prix de l'Arc de Triomphe – Ortello

Ireland

- Irish Grand National – Alike
- Irish Derby Stakes – Kopi

US

- Kentucky Derby – Clyde Van Dusen
- Preakness Stakes – Dr. Freeland
- Belmont Stakes – Blue Larkspur

== Ice hockey ==
Stanley Cup

- 28–29 March — Boston Bruins defeats New York Rangers by 2 games to 0 in the 1929 Stanley Cup Finals

== Lacrosse ==
Events

- The Intercollegiate Lacrosse League is renamed the U.S. Intercollegiate Lacrosse Association (USILA).

== Nordic skiing ==
FIS Nordic World Ski Championships

- 4th FIS Nordic World Ski Championships 1929 are held at Zakopane, Poland

== Rowing ==
The Boat Race

- 23 March — Cambridge wins the 81st Oxford and Cambridge Boat Race

== Rugby league ==
- The Australia national rugby league team embarked on the 1929–30 Kangaroo tour of Great Britain.

England

- Championship – Huddersfield
- Challenge Cup final – Wigan 13–2 Dewsbury at Empire Stadium, Wembley, London
- Lancashire League Championship – Swinton
- Yorkshire League Championship – Huddersfield
- Lancashire County Cup – Wigan 5–4 Widnes
- Yorkshire County Cup – Leeds 5–0 Featherstone Rovers

Australia

- NSW Premiership – South Sydney 30–10 Newtown (grand final)

== Rugby union ==
Five Nations Championship

- 42nd Five Nations Championship series is won by Scotland

== Snooker ==
World Championship

- 3rd World Snooker Championship is won by Joe Davis who defeats Tom Dennis 19–14

== Speed skating ==
Speed Skating World Championships

- Men's All-round Champion – Clas Thunberg (Finland)

== Tennis ==
Australia

- Australian Men's Singles Championship – Colin Gregory (Great Britain) defeats Richard Schlesinger (Australia) 6–2 6–2 5–7 7–5
- Australian Women's Singles Championship – Daphne Akhurst Cozens (Australia) defeats Louise Bickerton (Australia) 6–1 5–7 6–2

England

- Wimbledon Men's Singles Championship – Henri Cochet (France) defeats Jean Borotra (France) 6–4 6–3 6–4
- Wimbledon Women's Singles Championship – Helen Wills Moody (US) defeats Helen Jacobs (US) 6–1 6–2

France

- French Men's Singles Championship – René Lacoste (France) defeats Jean Borotra (France) 6–3 2–6 6–0 2–6 8–6
- French Women's Singles Championship – Helen Wills Moody (US) defeats Simonne Mathieu (France) 6–3 6–4

US

- American Men's Singles Championship – Bill Tilden (US) defeats Francis Hunter (US) 3–6 6–3 4–6 6–2 6–4
- American Women's Singles Championship – Helen Wills Moody (US) defeats Phoebe Holcroft Watson (Great Britain) 6–4 6–2

Davis Cup

- 1929 International Lawn Tennis Challenge – France 3–2 United States at Stade Roland Garros (clay) Paris, France
