= 1935 Australian Championships – Mixed doubles =

Mixed doubles
- 1935 Australian Championships

Final
- Champions: (Australia) Louie Bickerton (France) Christian Boussus
- Runners-up: (Australia) Birdie Bond (South Africa) Vernon Kirby
- Score: 1–6, 6–3, 6–3

Details
- Draw: 24
- Seeds: 4

Events
Singles	men	women		boys	girls
Doubles	men	women	mixed	boys	girls
- Australian Championships

In an all-unseeded final, Louie Bickerton and Christian Boussus defeated Birdie Bond and Vernon Kirby 1–6, 6–3, 6–3, to win the mixed doubles tennis title at the 1935 Australian Championships.

Bond and Kirby won the first set with ease. The second one was interrupted by rain thrice, which got them out of their rhythm and opponents won three remaining games. In the last three games of the third set Bickerton/Boussus lost only two points.

== Seeds ==
1. (United Kingdom) Dorothy Round / (United Kingdom) Fred Perry (quarterfinals)
2. (Australia) Nell Hopman / (Australia) Harry Hopman (second round)
3. (United Kingdom) Nancy Lyle / (Australia) Adrian Quist (semifinals)
4. (United Kingdom) Evelyn Dearman / (Spain) Enrique Maier (second round)

== Draw ==
Key

- Q = Qualifier
- WC = Wild card
- LL = Lucky loser
- Alt = Alternate
- ITF = ITF entry
- PR = Protected ranking
- SR = Special ranking
- SE = Special exempt
- JE = Junior exempt
- JR = Junior Accelerator Programme entrant
- CO = College Accelerator Programme entrant
- NG = Next Gen Accelerator Program entrant
- w/o = Walkover
- r = Retired
- d = Defaulted

=== Finals ===
Quarterfinals
1	(United Kingdom) Dorothy Round (United Kingdom) Fred Perry	3	1
(Australia) Emily Hood Westacott (Australia) Jack Cummings	6	6
(Australia) Shirley Whittaker (Australia) Gar Moon	3	4
(Australia) Birdie Bond (South Africa) Vernon Kirby	6	6
3	(United Kingdom) Nancy Lyle (Australia) Adrian Quist	6	6
(South Africa) Doreen Malcolm (South Africa) Roy Malcolm	0	1
(Australia) Louie Bickerton (France) Christian Boussus	6	7
(Australia) Kath Woodward (Czechoslovakia) Roderich Menzel	3	5

Semifinals
(Australia) Emily Hood Westacott (Australia) Jack Cummings	6	4	3
(Australia) Birdie Bond (South Africa) Vernon Kirby	4	6	6
3	(United Kingdom) Nancy Lyle (Australia) Adrian Quist	4	9
(Australia) Louie Bickerton (France) Christian Boussus	6	11

Final
(Australia) Birdie Bond (South Africa) Vernon Kirby	6	3	3
(Australia) Louie Bickerton (France) Christian Boussus	1	6	6

=== Earlier rounds ===
==== Section 1 ====
First round
(Australia) Shirley Whittaker (Australia) Gar Moon	4	6	6
(Australia) Truda Cox (Australia) Jack Harper	6	2	3
(Australia) Sylvia Harper (Italy) Giorgio de Stefani	w/o
(Australia) Nina Vickery (Australia) J. Davidson
4	(United Kingdom) Evelyn Dearman (Spain) Enrique Maier	6	6
(Australia) Dorothy Weston (Australia) Allan Knight	4	2
(Australia) Birdie Bond (South Africa) Vernon Kirby	6	6
(Australia) Mary Richardson (Australia) James Derham	3	4

Second round
1	(United Kingdom) Dorothy Round (United Kingdom) Fred Perry	6	6
(Australia) Mall Molesworth (Australia) John Grinstead	3	3
(Australia) Emily Hood Westacott (Australia) Jack Cummings	3	6	6
(Australia) Kathleen Le Messurier (Australia) Don Turnbull	6	4	3
(Australia) Shirley Whittaker (Australia) Gar Moon	5	10	6
(Australia) Sylvia Harper (Italy) Giorgio de Stefani	7	8	4
4	(United Kingdom) Evelyn Dearman (Spain) Enrique Maier	4	5
(Australia) Birdie Bond (South Africa) Vernon Kirby	6	7

Quarterfinals
1	(United Kingdom) Dorothy Round (United Kingdom) Fred Perry	3	1
(Australia) Emily Hood Westacott (Australia) Jack Cummings	6	6
(Australia) Shirley Whittaker (Australia) Gar Moon	3	4
(Australia) Birdie Bond (South Africa) Vernon Kirby	6	6

Semifinals
(Australia) Emily Hood Westacott (Australia) Jack Cummings	6	4	3
(Australia) Birdie Bond (South Africa) Vernon Kirby	4	6	6

==== Section 2 ====
First round
(Australia) Louie Bickerton (France) Christian Boussus	6	6
(Australia) Claire McCrae (Australia) Robert Vroland	1	3
(Australia) May Blick (Australia) Jack Clemenger	4	6	6
(Australia) Rosemary Rees (Australia) Colin McKenzie	6	2	2
2	(Australia) Nell Hopman (Australia) Harry Hopman	7	6
(Australia) Doris Mauger (Australia) Tim Fitchett	5	2
(Australia) Kath Woodward (Czechoslovakia) Roderich Menzel	6	6
(Australia) Thora Chittick (Australia) Bill Ryan	3	3

Second round
3	(United Kingdom) Nancy Lyle (Australia) Adrian Quist	8	10
(Australia) Gwen Stevenson (Australia) Bert Tonkin	6	8
(South Africa) Doreen Malcolm (South Africa) Roy Malcolm	6	8
(Australia) Dorothy Bellamy (France) Jacques Brugnon	4	6
(Australia) Louie Bickerton (France) Christian Boussus	6	6
(Australia) May Blick (Australia) Jack Clemenger	2	4
2	(Australia) Nell Hopman (Australia) Harry Hopman	3	2
(Australia) Kath Woodward (Czechoslovakia) Roderich Menzel	6	6

Quarterfinals
3	(United Kingdom) Nancy Lyle (Australia) Adrian Quist	6	6
(South Africa) Doreen Malcolm (South Africa) Roy Malcolm	0	1
(Australia) Louie Bickerton (France) Christian Boussus	6	7
(Australia) Kath Woodward (Czechoslovakia) Roderich Menzel	3	5

Semifinals
3	(United Kingdom) Nancy Lyle (Australia) Adrian Quist	4	9
(Australia) Louie Bickerton (France) Christian Boussus	6	11
