= 1935 Australian Championships – Women's doubles =

Women's doubles
- 1935 Australian Championships

Final
- Champions: (United Kingdom) Evelyn Dearman (United Kingdom) Nancy Lyle
- Runners-up: (Australia) Louie Bickerton (Australia) Nell Hopman
- Score: 6–3, 6–4

Details
- Draw: 16
- Seeds: 4

Events
Singles	men	women		boys	girls
Doubles	men	women	mixed	boys	girls
- Australian Championships

The first seeds Evelyn Dearman and Nancy Lyle defeated Louie Bickerton and Nell Hopman 6–3, 6–4 in the wholly replayed final, to win the women's doubles tennis title at the 1935 Australian Championships.

The original final encounter had to be ceased because of falling light. The score stood at set all: 6–3, 2–6.

== Seeds ==
1. (United Kingdom) Evelyn Dearman / (United Kingdom) Nancy Lyle (champions)
2. (Australia) Thelma Coyne^{[a]} / (United Kingdom) Dorothy Round (semifinals)
3. (Australia) Louie Bickerton / (Australia) Nell Hopman (final)
4. (Australia) Mall Molesworth / (Australia) Emily Hood Westacott (semifinals)

== Draw ==
Key

- Q = Qualifier
- WC = Wild card
- LL = Lucky loser
- Alt = Alternate
- ITF = ITF entry
- PR = Protected ranking
- SR = Special ranking
- SE = Special exempt
- JE = Junior exempt
- JR = Junior Accelerator Programme entrant
- CO = College Accelerator Programme entrant
- NG = Next Gen Accelerator Program entrant
- w/o = Walkover
- r = Retired
- d = Defaulted

=== Draw ===
First round
1	(United Kingdom) Evelyn Dearman (United Kingdom) Nancy Lyle	6	6
(Australia) Thora Chittick (Australia) Dorothy Greenwood	1	3
(Australia) Frances Hoddle-Wrigley (Australia) Rosemary Rees	6	5	8
(Australia) Birdie Bond (Australia) Mary Richardson	4	7	6
(Australia) Dot Stevenson (Australia) Gwen Stevenson	6	6	6
(Australia) Kathleen Le Messurier (Australia) Dorothy Weston	2	8	1
4	(Australia) Mall Molesworth (Australia) Emily Hood Westacott	4	6	6
(Australia) Doris Mauger (Australia) Shirley Whittaker	6	2	4
3	(Australia) Louie Bickerton (Australia) Nell Hopman	6	6
(Australia) Truda Cox (Australia) Gladys Toyne	1	4
(Australia) Dorothy Bellamy (Australia) Sylvia Harper	7	1	6
(Australia) Edna Harry (Australia) Agnes Scott	5	6	3
(Australia) Nancy Chitty (South Africa) Doreen Malcolm	6	6
(Australia) May Blick (Australia) Kath Woodward	2	0
2	(Australia) Thelma Coyne (United Kingdom) Dorothy Round	6	4	6
(Australia) Madge Carnie (Australia) Alma Cox	4	6	2

Quarterfinals
1	(United Kingdom) Evelyn Dearman (United Kingdom) Nancy Lyle	6	6
(Australia) Frances Hoddle-Wrigley (Australia) Rosemary Rees	1	3
(Australia) Dot Stevenson (Australia) Gwen Stevenson	3	3
4	(Australia) Mall Molesworth (Australia) Emily Hood Westacott	6	6
3	(Australia) Louie Bickerton (Australia) Nell Hopman	6	6
(Australia) Dorothy Bellamy (Australia) Sylvia Harper	1	3
(Australia) Nancy Chitty (South Africa) Doreen Malcolm	2	0
2	(Australia) Thelma Coyne (United Kingdom) Dorothy Round	6	6

Semifinals
1	(United Kingdom) Evelyn Dearman (United Kingdom) Nancy Lyle	6	6
4	(Australia) Mall Molesworth (Australia) Emily Hood Westacott	4	4
3	(Australia) Louie Bickerton (Australia) Nell Hopman	6	6
2	(Australia) Thelma Coyne (United Kingdom) Dorothy Round	2	4

Final
1	(United Kingdom) Evelyn Dearman (United Kingdom) Nancy Lyle	6	6
3	(Australia) Louie Bickerton (Australia) Nell Hopman	3	4

== Notes ==
- ^{a} Joan Hartigan, the original doubles partner for Miss Round, withdrew acting on medical advice. (See: reference #2).
