= 1929 Australian Championships – Mixed doubles =

Mixed doubles
- 1929 Australian Championships

Final
- Champions: (Australia) Daphne Akhurst (Australia) Gar Moon
- Runners-up: (Australia) Marjorie Cox (Australia) Jack Crawford
- Score: 6–0, 7–5

Details
- Draw: 16
- Seeds: 4

Events
Singles	men	women		boys	girls
Doubles	men	women	mixed	boys	girls
- Australian Championships

The fourth-seeded Daphne Akhurst and Gar Moon defeated the first seeds Marjorie Cox and Jack Crawford 6–0, 7–5 in the final, to win the mixed doubles tennis title at the 1929 Australian Championships.

== Seeds ==
1. (Australia) Marjorie Cox / (Australia) Jack Crawford (final)
2. (Australia) Meryl O'Hara Wood / (Australia) Pat O'Hara Wood (semifinals)
3. (Australia) Mall Molesworth / (United Kingdom) Colin Gregory (quarterfinals)
4. (Australia) Daphne Akhurst / (Australia) Gar Moon (champions)

== Draw ==
Key

- Q = Qualifier
- WC = Wild card
- LL = Lucky loser
- Alt = Alternate
- ITF = ITF entry
- PR = Protected ranking
- SR = Special ranking
- SE = Special exempt
- JE = Junior exempt
- JR = Junior Accelerator Programme entrant
- CO = College Accelerator Programme entrant
- NG = Next Gen Accelerator Program entrant
- w/o = Walkover
- r = Retired
- d = Defaulted

=== Draw ===
First round
1	(Australia) Marjorie Cox (Australia) Jack Crawford	6	6
(Australia) Emily Hood (Australia) Colin Cropper	1	4
(Australia) Nancy Day (Australia) Peter Hooper	w/o
(Australia) Birdie Bond (Australia) V. E. Page ^{[a]}
(Australia) Louie Bickerton (Australia) Rupert Wertheim	6	8
(Australia) Edna Lawrence (Australia) Ray Hone	2	6
3	(Australia) Mall Molesworth (United Kingdom) Colin Gregory	w/o
(Australia) Kathleen Le Messurier (Australia) Don Turnbull ^{[b]}
4	(Australia) Daphne Akhurst (Australia) Gar Moon	6	6
(Australia) Dorothy Weston (Australia) Ron Hone	3	1
(Australia) Lorna Bollen (Australia) D'Arcy Mullamphy	8	3	8
(Australia) Gwen Griffiths (Australia) Jim Black	6	6	6
(Australia) Sylvia Harper (United Kingdom) Ian Collins	6	6
(Australia) Mrs. V. Mathias ^{[c]} (Australia) Cliff Harvey	0	4
2	(Australia) Meryl O'Hara Wood (Australia) Pat O'Hara Wood	6	6
(Australia) Sydney Hocking (Australia) Lyall Reynolds	0	3

Quarterfinals
1	(Australia) Marjorie Cox (Australia) Jack Crawford	6	6
(Australia) Nancy Day (Australia) Peter Hooper	4	0
(Australia) Louie Bickerton (Australia) Rupert Wertheim	6	6
3	(Australia) Mall Molesworth (United Kingdom) Colin Gregory	2	3
4	(Australia) Daphne Akhurst (Australia) Gar Moon	6	6
(Australia) Lorna Bollen (Australia) D'Arcy Mullamphy	3	4
(Australia) Sylvia Harper (United Kingdom) Ian Collins	3	6	2
2	(Australia) Meryl O'Hara Wood (Australia) Pat O'Hara Wood	6	2	6

Semifinals
1	(Australia) Marjorie Cox (Australia) Jack Crawford	6	6
(Australia) Louie Bickerton (Australia) Rupert Wertheim	2	2
4	(Australia) Daphne Akhurst (Australia) Gar Moon	7	6
2	(Australia) Meryl O'Hara Wood (Australia) Pat O'Hara Wood	5	2

Final
1	(Australia) Marjorie Cox (Australia) Jack Crawford	0	5
4	(Australia) Daphne Akhurst (Australia) Gar Moon	6	7

== Notes ==
- ^{a} Page didn't show up at all because of health issues.
- ^{b} Turnbull severely injured his thumb the preceding day in the Linton Cup final.
- ^{c} Possibly Vera Lucy Mathias.
