= 1935 Australian Championships =

- Date: 1–14 January 1935
- Edition: 28th
- Category: Grand Slam (ITF)
- Surface: Grass
- Location: Melbourne, Australia
- Venue: Kooyong Stadium

Champions

Men's singles
- (Australia) Jack Crawford

Women's singles
- (United Kingdom) Dorothy Round

Men's doubles
- (Australia) Jack Crawford / (Australia) Vivian McGrath

Women's doubles
- (United Kingdom) Evelyn Dearman / (United Kingdom) Nancy Lyle

Mixed doubles
- (Australia) Louie Bickerton / (France) Christian Boussus

Boys' singles
- (Australia) John Bromwich

Girls' singles
- (Australia) Thelma Coyne

Boys' doubles
- (Australia) John Bromwich / (Australia) Arthur Huxley

Girls' doubles
- (Australia) Dot Stevenson / (Australia) Nancye Wynne
- Australian Championships

The 1935 Australian Championships was a tennis tournament that took place on outdoor grass courts at the Kooyong Stadium (Note: Many early matches (excluding those in which overseas players took part) and most junior events up to the finals held on the Albert Ground.) in Melbourne, Australia, from 1 to 14 January (Note: Because of the rain no match was played on Saturday, 5 January.). It was the 28th edition of the Australian Championships (now known as the Australian Open), the 8th held in Melbourne, and the first Grand Slam tournament of the year. Australian Jack Crawford and Dorothy Round from England won the singles titles.

== Finals ==
=== Men's singles ===
(Australia) Jack Crawford defeated (United Kingdom) Fred Perry 2–6, 6–4, 6–4, 6–4

=== Women's singles ===
(United Kingdom) Dorothy Round defeated (United Kingdom) Nancy Lyle 1–6, 6–1, 6–3

=== Men's doubles ===
(Australia) Jack Crawford / (Australia) Vivian McGrath defeated (United Kingdom) Pat Hughes / (United Kingdom) Fred Perry 6–4, 8–6, 6–2

=== Women's doubles ===
(United Kingdom) Evelyn Dearman / (United Kingdom) Nancy Lyle defeated (Australia) Louie Bickerton / (Australia) Nell Hall Hopman 6–3, 6–4

=== Mixed doubles ===
(Australia) Louie Bickerton / (France) Christian Boussus defeated (Australia) Birdie Bond / (South Africa) Vernon Kirby 1–6, 6–3, 6–3

== Notes ==
Preceded by 1934 U.S. National Championships	Grand Slams	Succeeded by 1935 French Championships
