= 1929 Australian Championships – Men's doubles =

Men's doubles
- 1929 Australian Championships

Final
- Champions: (Australia) Jack Crawford (Australia) Harry Hopman
- Runners-up: (Australia) Jack Cummings (Australia) Gar Moon
- Score: 6–1, 6–8, 4–6, 6–1, 6–3

Details
- Draw: 16
- Seeds: 7

Events
Singles	men	women		boys	girls
Doubles	men	women	mixed	boys	girls
- Australian Championships

The first-seeds Jack Crawford and Harry Hopman defeated Jack Cummings and Gar Moon 6–1, 6–8, 4–6, 6–1, 6–3 in the final, to win the men's doubles tennis title at the 1929 Australian Championships.

== Seeds ==
1. (Australia) Jack Crawford / (Australia) Harry Hopman (champions)
2. ( (United Kingdom) Ian Collins / (United Kingdom) Colin Gregory) (semifinals) (Note: Originally the second seeds were Bunny Austin with Gregory and the fifth seeds were Collins with Edward Higgs, but after injury forced the latter to withdraw from entire tournament, Austin scratched from the event for Collins to take his place.)
3. (Australia) Jack Cummings / (Australia) Gar Moon (final)
4. (Australia) Pat O'Hara Wood / (Australia) Ernest Rowe (quarterfinals)
5. n/a
6. (Australia) Bob Schlesinger / (Australia) Rupert Wertheim (semifinals)
7. (Australia) Gar Hone / (Australia) Ron Hone (quarterfinals)
8. (Australia) Jim Black / (Australia) Don Turnbull (first round)

== Draw ==
Key

- Q = Qualifier
- WC = Wild card
- LL = Lucky loser
- Alt = Alternate
- ITF = ITF entry
- PR = Protected ranking
- SR = Special ranking
- SE = Special exempt
- JE = Junior exempt
- JR = Junior Accelerator Programme entrant
- CO = College Accelerator Programme entrant
- NG = Next Gen Accelerator Program entrant
- w/o = Walkover
- r = Retired
- d = Defaulted

=== Draw ===
First round
(2)	(United Kingdom) Ian Collins (United Kingdom) Colin Gregory	6	6	6
(Australia) Erny Barritt (Australia) Dudley Middleton	3	1	1
(Australia) Cliff Harvey (Australia) Bruce Walker	6	6	6
(Australia) Max Noble (Australia) Tom Scaddan	2	1	1
7	(Australia) Gar Hone (Australia) Ron Hone	6	12	6
(Australia) George Vincent (Australia) Keith Dalgleish	0	10	0
3	(Australia) Jack Cummings (Australia) Gar Moon	6	6	6
(Australia) Arthur Cattanach (Australia) Dudley Frankenberg	1	4	1
4	(Australia) Pat O'Hara Wood (Australia) Ernest Rowe	6	6	4	6
(Australia) F. McCracken (Australia) J. S. D. Sweeting	4	3	6	2
6	(Australia) Bob Schlesinger (Australia) Rupert Wertheim	6	6	6
(Australia) Peter Hooper (Australia) Keith Manthorpe	4	2	0
(Australia) Bruce Moore (Australia) Dave Thompson	w/o
8	(Australia) Jim Black (Australia) Don Turnbull (Note: Turnbull severely injured his thumb the preceding day in the Linton Cup final.)
1	(Australia) Jack Crawford (Australia) Harry Hopman	6	6	6
(Australia) Ray Hone (Australia) Morris Smith	2	2	0

Quarterfinals
(2)	(United Kingdom) Ian Collins (United Kingdom) Colin Gregory	6	4	6	10
(Australia) Cliff Harvey (Australia) Bruce Walker	3	6	2	8
7	(Australia) Gar Hone (Australia) Ron Hone	4	4	6	7
3	(Australia) Jack Cummings (Australia) Gar Moon	6	6	3	9
4	(Australia) Pat O'Hara Wood (Australia) Ernest Rowe	4	6	1	1
6	(Australia) Bob Schlesinger (Australia) Rupert Wertheim	6	0	6	6
(Australia) Bruce Moore (Australia) Dave Thompson	2	3	9	1	r
1	(Australia) Jack Crawford (Australia) Harry Hopman	6	6	7	3

Semifinals
(2)	(United Kingdom) Ian Collins (United Kingdom) Colin Gregory	6	4	1	5
3	(Australia) Jack Cummings (Australia) Gar Moon	3	6	6	7
6	(Australia) Bob Schlesinger (Australia) Rupert Wertheim	3	6	3	3
1	(Australia) Jack Crawford (Australia) Harry Hopman	6	4	6	6

Final
3	(Australia) Jack Cummings (Australia) Gar Moon	1	8	6	1	3
1	(Australia) Jack Crawford (Australia) Harry Hopman	6	6	4	6	6
