= 1935 Australian Championships – Men's doubles =

Men's doubles
- 1935 Australian Championships

Final
- Champions: (Australia) Jack Crawford (Australia) Vivian McGrath
- Runners-up: (United Kingdom) Pat Hughes (United Kingdom) Fred Perry
- Score: 6–4, 8–6, 6–2

Details
- Draw: 16
- Seeds: 8

Events
Singles	men	women		boys	girls
Doubles	men	women	mixed	boys	girls
← 1934 ·	Australian Championships	· 1936 →

The third seeds Jack Crawford and Vivian McGrath defeated the defending champions Pat Hughes and Fred Perry 6–4, 8–6, 6–2 in the final, to win the men's doubles tennis title at the 1935 Australian Championships.

In the first set of the final Hughes was the only player to lose his service. The Englishmen went off with a three-love lead in the second set and later they held three set points when leading 5–2. Crawford and McGrath saved it, won the next three games and – after Perry evened the games again – they took advantage off Hughes' double fault in the 13th to close this set winning the 14th to love. In the last three games of the mostly one-sided third set Australian pair lost only four points and sealed their victory with an ace.

Falling light caused a cessation of play in three matches in earlier rounds.

In the first round Bromwich and Huxley, colts from New South Wales, took a 2 sets to 1 lead against the first seeds Hughes and Perry. Because of the rain no matches were played the next day and this rubber was concluded three days later on Monday, 7 January. Defending champions fully recovered winning remaining two sets. The same day, in the quarterfinals, another match was not completed in which previous year finalists and the second seeds Quist and Turnbull trailed the Frenchmen Boussus and Brugnon two sets. Two days later they improved accuracy and resorted to lobbing to win remaining three sets with relative ease. Later that day other quarterfinal match between Menzel/Moon and Hopman/Maier remain unfinished and the score stood at two sets all. The next day the latter pair won fifth set and went on to play their semifinals against Hughes/Perry.

== Seeds ==
1. (United Kingdom) Pat Hughes / (United Kingdom) Fred Perry (final)
2. (Australia) Adrian Quist / (Australia) Don Turnbull (semifinals)
3. (Australia) Jack Crawford / (Australia) Vivian McGrath (champions)
4. (Australia) Harry Hopman / (Spain) Enrique Maier (semifinals)
5. (France) Christian Boussus / (France) Jacques Brugnon (quarterfinals)
6. (Czechoslovakia) Roderich Menzel / (Australia) Gar Moon (quarterfinals)
7. (South Africa) Vernon Kirby / (South Africa) Roy Malcolm (quarterfinals)
8. (Australia) Jack Clemenger / (Australia) Abel Kay (first round)

== Draw ==
=== Key ===
- Q = Qualifier
- WC = Wild card
- LL = Lucky loser
- Alt = Alternate
- ITF = ITF entry
- PR = Protected ranking
- SR = Special ranking
- SE = Special exempt
- JE = Junior exempt
- JR = Junior Accelerator Programme entrant
- CO = College Accelerator Programme entrant
- NG = Next Gen Accelerator Program entrant
- w/o = Walkover
- r = Retired
- d = Defaulted

=== Draw ===
First round
1	(United Kingdom) Pat Hughes (United Kingdom) Fred Perry	6	4	3	6	6
(Australia) John Bromwich (Australia) Arthur Huxley	4	6	6	3	4
(Australia) Reg Ewin (Italy) Giorgio de Stefani	6	1	4	6	6
8	(Australia) Jack Clemenger (Australia) Abel Kay	3	6	6	3	4
6	(Czechoslovakia) Roderich Menzel (Australia) Gar Moon	6	6	6
(Australia) Allan Knight (United States) William Robertson	2	2	4
4	(Australia) Harry Hopman (Spain) Enrique Maier	8	6	3	9
(Australia) Tim Fitchett (Australia) Jack Harper	6	1	6	7
3	(Australia) Jack Crawford (Australia) Vivian McGrath	8	6	6
(Australia) Bert Tonkin (Australia) Jack Purcell	6	2	2
7	(South Africa) Vernon Kirby (South Africa) Roy Malcolm	6	13	1	9
(Australia) Jack Cummings (Australia) John Grinstead	1	11	6	7
5	(France) Christian Boussus (France) Jacques Brugnon	6	6	8
(Australia) Bill Ryan (Australia) Robert Vroland	1	3	6
2	(Australia) Adrian Quist (Australia) Don Turnbull	6	6	6
(Australia) Neil Ennis (Australia) Colin McKenzie	0	0	0

Quarterfinals
1	(United Kingdom) Pat Hughes (United Kingdom) Fred Perry	7	6	6
(Australia) Reg Ewin (Italy) Giorgio de Stefani	5	3	2
6	(Czechoslovakia) Roderich Menzel (Australia) Gar Moon	4	1	6	8	5
4	(Australia) Harry Hopman (Spain) Enrique Maier	6	6	4	6	7
3	(Australia) Jack Crawford (Australia) Vivian McGrath	6	4	8	6
7	(South Africa) Vernon Kirby (South Africa) Roy Malcolm	4	6	6	2
5	(France) Christian Boussus (France) Jacques Brugnon	13	10	3	3	2
2	(Australia) Adrian Quist (Australia) Don Turnbull	11	8	6	6	6

Semifinals
1	(United Kingdom) Pat Hughes (United Kingdom) Fred Perry	6	7	6
4	(Australia) Harry Hopman (Spain) Enrique Maier	3	5	3
3	(Australia) Jack Crawford (Australia) Vivian McGrath	6	6	6
2	(Australia) Adrian Quist (Australia) Don Turnbull	3	4	3

Final
1	(United Kingdom) Pat Hughes (United Kingdom) Fred Perry	4	6	2
3	(Australia) Jack Crawford (Australia) Vivian McGrath	6	8	6
