= 1929 Australian Championships – Women's doubles =

Women Australian Championship

Women's doubles
- 1929 Australian Championships

Final
- Champions: (Australia) Daphne Akhurst (Australia) Louie Bickerton
- Runners-up: (Australia) Sylvia Harper (Australia) Meryl O'Hara Wood
- Score: 6–2, 3–6, 6–2

Details
- Draw: 12
- Seeds: 4

Events
Singles	men	women		boys	girls
Doubles	men	women	mixed	boys	girls
- Australian Championships

First-seeded Daphne Akhurst and Louie Bickerton defeated the second seeds Sylvia Harper and Meryl O'Hara Wood 6–2, 3–6, 6–2 in the final, to win the women's doubles tennis title at the 1929 Australian Championships.

Miss Akhurst completed her third and last Triple Crown, having won the Women's Singles title earlier that day and the Mixed Doubles final the day before.

== Seeds ==
1. (Australia) Daphne Akhurst / (Australia) Louie Bickerton (champions)
2. (Australia) Sylvia Harper / (Australia) Meryl O'Hara Wood (final)
3. (Australia) Kathleen Le Messurier / (Australia) Dorothy Weston (semifinals)
4. (Australia) Emily Hood / (Australia) Mall Molesworth (semifinals)

== Draw ==
Key

- Q = Qualifier
- WC = Wild card
- LL = Lucky loser
- Alt = Alternate
- ITF = ITF entry
- PR = Protected ranking
- SR = Special ranking
- SE = Special exempt
- JE = Junior exempt
- JR = Junior Accelerator Programme entrant
- CO = College Accelerator Programme entrant
- NG = Next Gen Accelerator Program entrant
- w/o = Walkover
- r = Retired
- d = Defaulted

=== Draw ===
First round
(Australia) Birdie Bond (Australia) Sydney Hocking	4	6	6
(Australia) Gwen Griffiths (Australia) Vera Mathias	6	4	4
3	(Australia) Kathleen Le Messurier (Australia) Dorothy Weston	6	6
(Australia) Eileen Rischbieth (Australia) Roma Wadey	4	0
(Australia) Lorna Bollen (Australia) Anna Menz	3	6	6
(Australia) Bertha Kay (Australia) Margaret Taylor	6	2	4
1	(Australia) Daphne Akhurst (Australia) Louie Bickerton	6	6
(Australia) Joyce Lillecrapp (Australia) Katherine Wemyss	2	0

Quarterfinals
2	(Australia) Sylvia Harper (Australia) Meryl O'Hara Wood	6	6
(Australia) Edna Lawrence (Australia) Mrs. W. T. Rowe ^{[a]}	0	1
(Australia) Birdie Bond (Australia) Sydney Hocking	4	8	4
3	(Australia) Kathleen Le Messurier (Australia) Dorothy Weston	6	6	6
4	(Australia) Emily Hood (Australia) Mall Molesworth	6	6
(Australia) Edna Collison (Australia) Joyce Hone	0	1
(Australia) Lorna Bollen (Australia) Anna Menz	3	2
1	(Australia) Daphne Akhurst (Australia) Louie Bickerton	6	6

Semifinals
2	(Australia) Sylvia Harper (Australia) Meryl O'Hara Wood	7	6
3	(Australia) Kathleen Le Messurier (Australia) Dorothy Weston	5	2
4	(Australia) Emily Hood (Australia) Mall Molesworth	2	2
1	(Australia) Daphne Akhurst (Australia) Louie Bickerton	6	6

Final
2	(Australia) Sylvia Harper (Australia) Meryl O'Hara Wood	2	6	2
1	(Australia) Daphne Akhurst (Australia) Louie Bickerton	6	3	6

== Notes ==
- ^{a} Mother of Ernest Rowe, most likely Flora Rowe.
