= 1935 Australian Championships – Women's singles =

Women's singles
- 1935 Australian Championships

Final
- Champion: (United Kingdom) Dorothy Round
- Runner-up: (United Kingdom) Nancy Lyle
- Score: 1–6, 6–1, 6–3

Details
- Draw: 32
- Seeds: 8

Events
Singles	men	women		boys	girls
Doubles	men	women	mixed	boys	girls
- Australian Championships

First-seeded Dorothy Round defeated Nancy Lyle 1–6, 6–1, 6–3, in the final to win the women's singles tennis title at the 1935 Australian Championships. The final was the first not to feature an Australian player and is the only all British final in the championship's history.

== Seeds ==
The seeded players are listed below. Dorothy Round is the champion; others show the round in which they were eliminated.

1. (United Kingdom) Dorothy Round (champion)
2. n/a (Note: Original second seed Joan Hartigan withdrew acting on medical advice.)
3. (Australia) Emily Hood Westacott (semifinals)
4. (United Kingdom) Nancy Lyle (finalist)
5. (United Kingdom) Evelyn Dearman (quarterfinals)
6. (Australia) Louie Bickerton (quarterfinals)
7. (Australia) Nell Hopman (semifinals)
8. (Australia) May Blick (quarterfinals)

== Draw ==
=== Key ===
- Q = Qualifier
- WC = Wild card
- LL = Lucky loser
- r = Retired

=== Finals ===
Quarterfinals
(Australia) Joan Walters	6	1	3
7	(Australia) Nell Hopman	4	6	6
4	(United Kingdom) Nancy Lyle	6	8
6	(Australia) Louie Bickerton	2	6
1	(United Kingdom) Dorothy Round	6	6
8	(Australia) May Blick	4	0
3	(Australia) Emily Hood Westacott	9	7
5	(United Kingdom) Evelyn Dearman	7	5

Semifinals
7	(Australia) Nell Hopman	1	5
4	(United Kingdom) Nancy Lyle	6	7
1	(United Kingdom) Dorothy Round	6	6
3	(Australia) Emily Hood Westacott	4	2

Finals
4	(United Kingdom) Nancy Lyle	6	1	3
1	(United Kingdom) Dorothy Round	1	6	6

=== Earlier rounds ===
==== Section 1 ====
First round
(Australia) Walters	6	8
(Australia) Lewis	2	6
(Australia) Chitty	6	6
(Australia) Rees	4	1
7	(Australia) Hopman	6	6
(Australia) Hoddle-Wrigley	2	3
(Australia) Weston	6	6
(Australia) Coyne	2	3
4	(United Kingdom) Lyle	6	6
(Australia) Stevenson	0	0
(Australia) Whittaker	6	6
(Australia) Chittick	3	3
6	(Australia) Bickerton	6	6
(Australia) A Cox	4	3
(Australia) Woodward	4	7	8
(Australia) Bond	6	5	6

Second round
(Australia) Walters	7	6
(Australia) Chitty	5	4
7	(Australia) Hopman	11	6
(Australia) Weston	9	3
4	(United Kingdom) Lyle	6	6
(Australia) Whittaker	0	2
6	(Australia) Bickerton	6	6
(Australia) Woodward	4	4

Quarterfinals
(Australia) Walters	6	1	3
7	(Australia) Hopman	4	6	6
4	(United Kingdom) Lyle	6	8
6	(Australia) Bickerton	2	6

Semifinals
7	(Australia) Hopman	1	5
4	(United Kingdom) Lyle	6	7

==== Section 2 ====
First round
1	(United Kingdom) Round	6	6
(Australia) Stevenson	2	3
(Australia) Mauger	6	6
(Australia) Le Mesurier	1	4
8	(Australia) Blick	6	7	8
(Australia) Berryman	2	9	6
(Australia) Molesworth	6	6
(Australia) Dickens	2	2
3	(Australia) Westacott	6	6
(Australia) T Cox	1	0
(Australia) Bellamy	6	6
(Australia) Greenwood	1	2
5	(United Kingdom) Dearman	6	6
(Australia) Harry	1	2
(Australia) Wynne	6	6
(South Africa) Malcolm	1	2

Second round
1	(United Kingdom) Round	6	6
(Australia) Mauger	2	2
8	(Australia) Blick	6	4	7
(Australia) Molesworth	4	6	5
3	(Australia) Westacott	6	6
(Australia) Bellamy	4	2
5	(United Kingdom) Dearman	6	6
(Australia) Wynne	3	2

Quarterfinals
1	(United Kingdom) Round	6	6
8	(Australia) Blick	4	0
3	(Australia) Westacott	9	7
5	(United Kingdom) Dearman	7	5

Semifinals
1	(United Kingdom) Round	6	6
3	(Australia) Westacott	4	2

== Notes ==
Preceded by 1934 U.S. National Championships – Women's singles	Grand Slam women's singles	Succeeded by 1935 French Championships – Women's singles
