= 1935 Australian Championships – Men's singles =

Men's singles
- 1935 Australian Championships

Final
- Champion: (Australia) Jack Crawford
- Runner-up: (United Kingdom) Fred Perry
- Score: 2–6, 6–4, 6–4, 6–4

Details
- Draw: 40
- Seeds: 8

Events
Singles	men	women		boys	girls
Doubles	men	women	mixed	boys	girls
- Australian Championships

Jack Crawford defeated Fred Perry 2–6, 6–4, 6–4, 6–4 in the final to win the men's singles tennis title at the 1935 Australian Championships.

== Seeds ==
The seeded players are listed below. Jack Crawford is the champion; others show the round in which they were eliminated.

1. (United Kingdom) Fred Perry (finalist)
2. (Australia) Jack Crawford (champion)
3. (Czechoslovakia) Roderich Menzel (quarterfinals)
4. (France) Christian Boussus (third round)
5. (Australia) Vivian McGrath (semifinals)
6. (Australia) Adrian Quist (semifinals)
7. (Italy) Giorgio de Stefani (quarterfinals)
8. (South Africa) Vernon Kirby (second round)

== Draw ==
=== Key ===
- Q = Qualifier
- WC = Wild card
- LL = Lucky loser
- r = Retired

=== Finals ===
Quarterfinals
1	(United Kingdom) Fred Perry	6	6	6
7	(Italy) Giorgio de Stefani	0	0	0
(Australia) Don Turnbull	7	7	4	6	3
5	(Australia) Vivian McGrath	9	5	6	2	6
2	(Australia) Jack Crawford	6	10	6
(Australia) Edgar Moon	0	8	2
3	(Czechoslovakia) Roderich Menzel	1	3	10	6	1
6	(Australia) Adrian Quist	6	6	8	1	6

Semifinals
1	(United Kingdom) Fred Perry	6	6	6
5	(Australia) Vivian McGrath	2	3	1
2	(Australia) Jack Crawford	6	1	6	3	6
6	(Australia) Adrian Quist	1	6	2	6	3

Final
1	(United Kingdom) Fred Perry	6	4	4	4
2	(Australia) Jack Crawford	2	6	6	6

=== Earlier rounds ===
==== Section 1 ====
First round
(Australia) E Mahony	4	3	6	6	6
(Australia) Boone	6	6	4	2	4
(Australia) Frankenberg	6	6	7
(Australia) Vroland	2	3	5

Second round
1	(United Kingdom) Perry	6	6	6
(Australia) Mahony	3	4	2
(Australia) Knight	3	5	3
(South Africa) Malcolm	6	7	6
7	(Italy) de Stefani	6	6	6
(Australia) Frankenberg	1	1	1
(Australia) Clemenger	6	6	6
(France) Brugnon	4	4	2

Third round
1	(United Kingdom) Perry	6	6	6
(South Africa) Malcolm	2	3	0
7	(Italy) de Stefani	6	8	6
(Australia) Clemenger	2	6	2

Quarterfinals
1	(United Kingdom) Perry	6	6	6
7	(Italy) de Stefani	0	0	0

==== Section 2 ====
First round
(Australia) Huxley
(Australia) Bayley	w/o
(Australia) McKenzie
(Australia) Weston	w/o

Second round
4	(France) Boussus	6	6	8
(Australia) Huxley	1	2	6
(Australia) Turnbull	9	6	6
(Australia) Grinstead	7	4	3
5	(Australia) McGrath	6	6	6
(Australia) McKenzie	0	3	4
(Spain) Maier	6	6	6
(Australia) Kay	1	4	3

Third round
4	(France) Boussus	3	3	5
(Australia) Turnbull	6	6	7
5	(Australia) McGrath	6	5	6	6
(Spain) Maier	1	7	3	2

Quarterfinals
(Australia) Turnbull	7	7	4	6	3
5	(Australia) McGrath	9	5	6	2	6

==== Section 3 ====
First round
(Australia) Temple	5	6	6	6
(Australia) Lock	7	3	3	3
(Australia) Bromwich	6	6	4	6
(Australia) Harper	3	4	6	1

Second round
2	(Australia) Crawford	6	6	6
(Australia) Temple	1	1	2
(Australia) Tonkin	7	6	6	3	6
(Australia) Cummings	5	8	3	6	2
8	(South Africa) Kirby	6	2	5	1
(Australia) Bromwich	4	6	7	6
(Australia) Moon	6	1	6	6
(Australia) Purcell	3	6	2	1

Third round
2	(Australia) Crawford	7	7	7
(Australia) Tonkin	5	5	5
(Australia) Bromwich	4	4	9	6	2
(Australia) Moon	6	6	7	2	6

Quarterfinals
2	(Australia) Crawford	6	10	6
(Australia) Moon	0	8	2

==== Section 4 ====
First round
(Australia) Ryan	4	6	6	6
(Australia) Newcombe	6	0	3	4
(Australia) Walton	6	6	8
(Australia) K Mahony	4	2	6

Second round
3	(Czechoslovakia) Menzel	6	6	3	6
(Australia) Ryan	4	1	6	3
(United Kingdom) Hughes	6	6	6
(United States) Robertson	1	0	3
6	(Australia) Quist	6	6	6
(Australia) Walton	1	2	3
(Australia) Ewin	0	0	3
(Australia) Hopman	6	6	6

Third round
3	(Czechoslovakia) Menzel	6	3	6	6
(United Kingdom) Hughes	4	6	3	1
6	(Australia) Quist	8	6	9	6
(Australia) Hopman	10	3	7	1

Quarterfinals
3	(Czechoslovakia) Menzel	1	3	10	6	1
6	(Australia) Quist	6	6	8	1	6

Preceded by 1934 U.S. National Championships	Grand Slam men's singles	Succeeded by 1935 French Championships
