= 1928–29 Sheffield Shield season =

Australian cricket tournament

1928–29 Sheffield Shield
- Cricket format: First-class
- Tournament format: Double round-robin
- Champions: New South Wales (18th title)
- Participants: 4
- Matches: 12
- Most runs: Don Bradman (New South Wales) (893)
- Most wickets: Tim Wall (South Australia) (29)

The 1928–29 Sheffield Shield season was the 33rd season of the Sheffield Shield, the domestic first-class cricket competition of Australia. New South Wales won the championship.

== Points system ==
- 5 points for a win (changed from 4 points)
- 3 points for a win on first innings
- 1 point for a loss on first innings

== Table ==
Team	Played	Won	1st Inns Won	1st Inns Lost	Lost	Points
New South Wales	6	3	3	0	0	24
Victoria	6	2	0	4	0	14
Queensland	6	1	1	1	3	9
South Australia	6	1	1	0	4	8

== Statistics ==
=== Most Runs ===
Don Bradman 893

=== Most Wickets ===
Tim Wall 29
