= 1929 Currie Cup =

Domestic rugby union competition

- Countries: South Africa
- Champions: Western Province (13th title)

The 1929 Currie Cup was the 16th edition of the Currie Cup, the premier domestic rugby union competition in South Africa.

The tournament was won by Western Province for the 13th time.

== See also ==
- Currie Cup
