= 1929 Australian Championships =

- Date: 19–26 January 1929
- Edition: 22nd
- Category: Grand Slam (ITF)
- Surface: Grass
- Location: Adelaide, Australia
- Venue: Memorial Drive

Champions

Men's singles
- (United Kingdom) Colin Gregory

Women's singles
- (Australia) Daphne Akhurst

Men's doubles
- (Australia) Jack Crawford / (Australia) Harry Hopman

Women's doubles
- (Australia) Daphne Akhurst / (Australia) Louie Bickerton

Mixed doubles
- (Australia) Daphne Akhurst / (Australia) Gar Moon

Boys' singles
- (Australia) Jack Crawford

Boys' doubles
- (Australia) Colin Cropper / (Australia) Bruce Walker
- Australian Championships

The 1929 Australian Championships was a tennis tournament that took place on outdoor Grass courts at the Memorial Drive, Adelaide, Australia from 19 January to 28 January. It was the 22nd edition of the Australian Championships (now known as the Australian Open), the 4th held in Adelaide, and the first Grand Slam tournament of the year. The singles titles were won by British Colin Gregory and Australian Daphne Akhurst.

== Finals ==
=== Men's singles ===
(United Kingdom) Colin Gregory defeated (Australia) Bob Schlesinger 6–2, 6–2, 5–7, 7–5

=== Women's singles ===
(Australia) Daphne Akhurst defeated (Australia) Louie Bickerton 6–1, 5–7, 6–2

=== Men's doubles ===
(Australia) Jack Crawford / (Australia) Harry Hopman defeated (Australia) Jack Cummings / (Australia) Gar Moon 6–1, 6–8, 4–6, 6–1, 6–3

=== Women's doubles ===
(Australia) Daphne Akhurst / (Australia) Louie Bickerton defeated (Australia) Sylvia Harper / (Australia) Meryl O'Hara Wood 6–2, 3–6, 6–2

=== Mixed doubles ===
(Australia) Daphne Akhurst / (Australia) Gar Moon defeated (Australia) Marjorie Cox / (Australia) Jack Crawford 6–0, 7–5

| Preceded by 1928 U.S. National Championships | Grand Slams | Succeeded by 1929 French Championships |
