= 1929 Australian Championships – Women's singles =

Women's singles
- 1929 Australian Championships

Final
- Champion: (Australia) Daphne Akhurst
- Runner-up: (Australia) Louie Bickerton
- Score: 6–1, 5–7, 6–2

Details
- Draw: 17
- Seeds: 8

Events
Singles	men	women		boys	girls
Doubles	men	women	mixed	boys	girls
- Australian Championships

First-seeded Daphne Akhurst defeated Louie Bickerton 6–1, 5–7, 6–2, in the final to win the women's singles tennis title at the 1929 Australian Championships.

== Seeds ==
The seeded players are listed below. Daphne Akhurst is the champion; others show the round in which they were eliminated.

1. (Australia) Daphne Akhurst (champion)
2. (Australia) Louie Bickerton (finalist)
3. (Australia) Marjorie Cox (semifinals)
4. (Australia) Sylvia Harper (semifinals)
5. (Australia) Meryl O'Hara Wood (quarterfinals)
6. (Australia) Mall Molesworth (quarterfinals)
7. (Australia) Kathleen Le Messurier (quarterfinals)
8. (Australia) Birdie Bond (first round)

== Draw ==
=== Key ===
- Q = Qualifier
- WC = Wild card
- LL = Lucky loser
- r = Retired

=== Finals ===
Quarterfinals
1	(Australia) Daphne Akhurst	6	6
5	(Australia) Meryl O'Hara Wood	4	3
4	(Australia) Sylvia Harper	6	6
6	(Australia) Mall Molesworth	1	4
2	(Australia) Louie Bickerton	6	8
7	(Australia) Kathleen Le Messurier	0	6
3	(Australia) Marjorie Cox	6	6
(Australia) Emily Hood	0	1

Semifinals
1	(Australia) Daphne Akhurst	6	6
4	(Australia) Sylvia Harper	3	1
2	(Australia) Louie Bickerton	6	6
3	(Australia) Marjorie Cox	1	3

Finals
1	(Australia) Daphne Akhurst	6	5	6
2	(Australia) Louie Bickerton	1	7	2

=== Earlier rounds ===
==== Section 1 ====
First round
(Australia) Griffiths	4	6	6
(Australia) Mrs. V. Mathias ^{[a]}	6	4	3

Second round
1	(Australia) Akhurst	6	6
(Australia) Bollen	0	3
5	(Australia) O'Hara Wood	6	6
(Australia) Lillecrapp	2	2
4	(Australia) Harper	6	6
(Australia) Lawrence	1	2
6	(Australia) Molesworth	6	6
(Australia) Griffiths	3	0

Quarterfinals
1	(Australia) Akhurst	6	6
5	(Australia) O'Hara Wood	4	3
4	(Australia) Harper	6	6
6	(Australia) Molesworth	1	4

Semifinals
1	(Australia) Akhurst	6	6
4	(Australia) Harper	3	1

==== Section 2 ====
First round

Second round
2	(Australia) Bickerton	6	6
(Australia) Menz	0	1
7	(Australia) Le Messurier	6	6
(Australia) Hocking	2	2
3	(Australia) Cox	6	6
(Australia) Weston	3	4
(Australia) Hood	11	7
8	(Australia) Bond	9	5

Quarterfinals
2	(Australia) Bickerton	6	8
7	(Australia) Le Messurier	0	6
3	(Australia) Cox	6	6
(Australia) Hood	0	1

Semifinals
2	(Australia) Bickerton	6	6
3	(Australia) Cox	1	3

== Notes ==
- ^{a} Possibly Vera Lucy Mathias.

Preceded by 1928 U.S. National Championships – Women's singles	Grand Slam women's singles	Succeeded by 1929 French Championships – Women's singles
