= Christian Boussus =

French tennis player

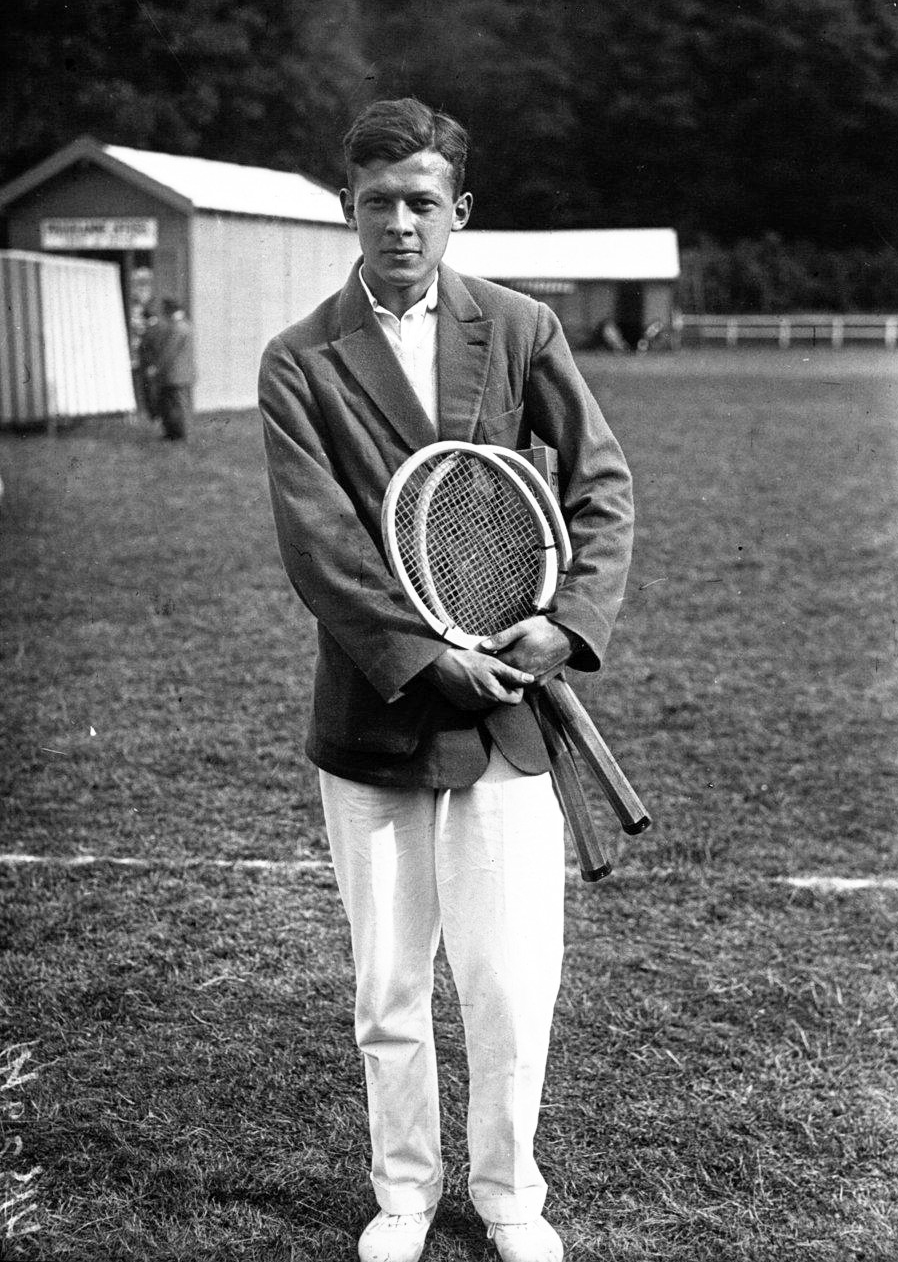
- Christian Boussus in 1927
- Full name: Jacques Christian Boussus
- Country (sports): France
- Born: 5 March 1908 Hyères, France
- Died: August 2003 (aged 95) Neuilly-sur-Seine, France
- Turned pro: 1926 (amateur tour)
- Retired: 1953
- Plays: Left-handed (1-handed backhand)

Singles
- Career record: 447-173 (72.1%)
- Career titles: 49
- Highest ranking: No. 9 (1930, A. Wallis Myers)

Grand Slam singles results
- Australian Open: 4R (1928, 1935)
- French Open: F (1931)
- Wimbledon: SF (1928)
- US Open: 4R (1928, 1931)

Grand Slam doubles results
- French Open: F (1932)
- Wimbledon: QF (1929)

Grand Slam mixed doubles results
- Australian Open: W (1935)
- French Open: F (1938)
- Wimbledon: QF (1938)

Christian Boussus (5 March 1908 – 12 August 2003) was a left-handed French tennis player who found success in the 1920s and 1930s.

== Tennis career ==
He started playing amateur tennis in the late 1920s by entering one of his first tournaments at the age of 17 in the 1926 edition of The French Covered Courts tournament in doubles, which he won by teaming up with French veteran René Lacoste. He was the runner-up at the Pacific South-west Championship in 1928(lost to fellow Frenchman Henri Cochet) although he won the mixed title trophy alongside American Anna Harper. The same year he won his first outdoor doubles title in Düsseldorf pairing Davis Cup teammate Jean Borotra. He won his first singles championships in 1929. He was on the victorious French team at the Davis Cup four times, in 1929, 1930, 1931, and 1932, although he never played. The members of the team became known as the "Four Musketeers" and Boussus was the "Fifth Musketeer". He finally got his chance to play at the Davis cup in 1934, when the Four Musketeers had retired. During World War II in 1941 in Vichy France, he won the unofficial French Open doubles title partnering Bernard Destremau, a feat that is unrecognized by the ITF. The same year he starred in a movie called "L'Appel du stade". After the war he became the captain of the French Davis Cup Team between 1949 and 1952 and vice-captain from 1953. In the very first year of his leadership France reached the final of the 1949 Davis Cup for the first time in 15 years. In club level team competitions he represented Racing Club de France of Paris.

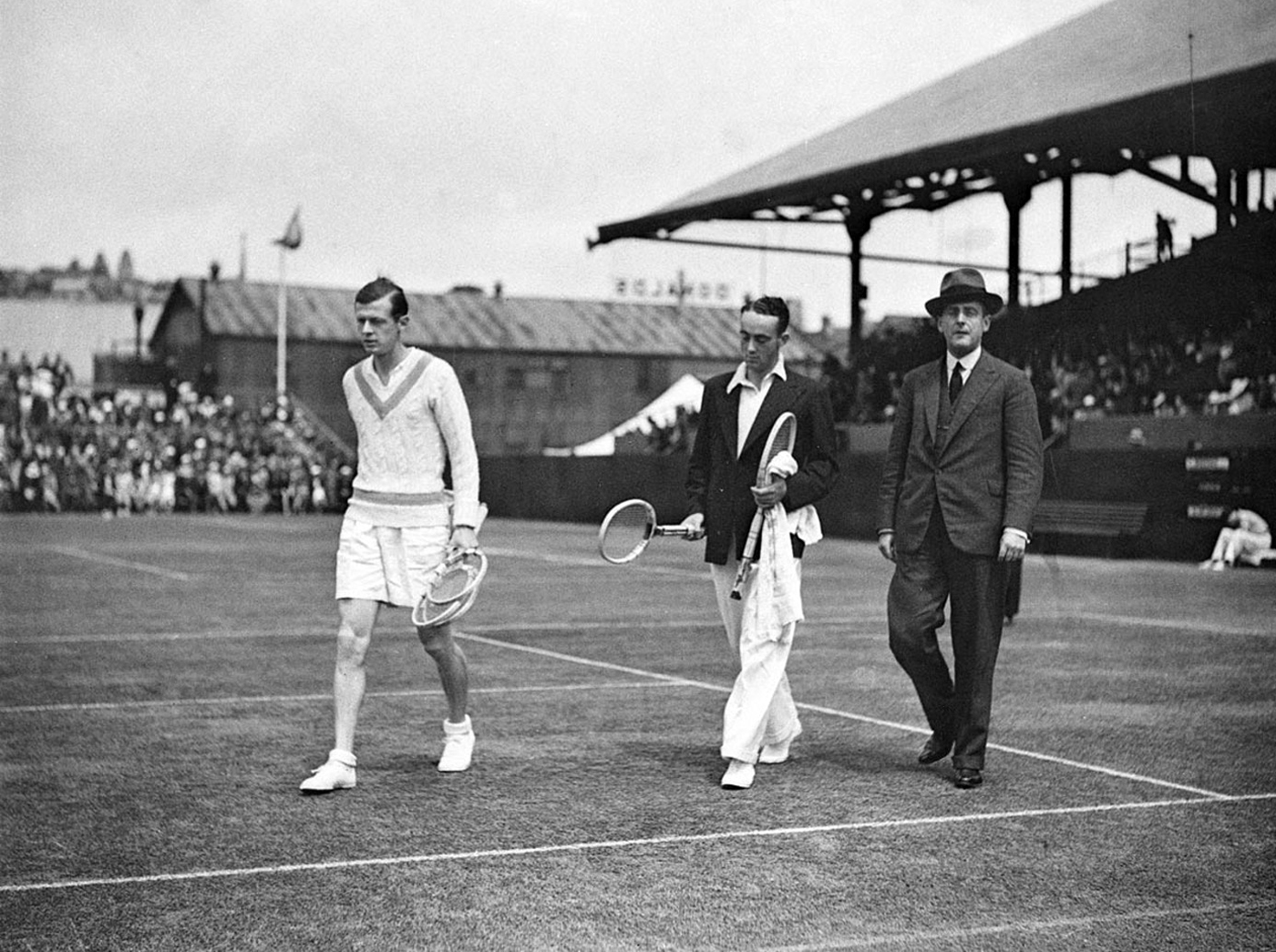
Christian Boussus (left) and Vivian McGrath (center) enter the center court of the White City Stadium in Sydney, Australia in November 1934

Boussus was defeated in the finals of the 1931 French Championships by Jean Borotra. In 1932, he and Marcel Bernard were defeated in the doubles finals of the French Championships by Henri Cochet and Jacques Brugnon. He played twice the Australian Championships, in 1928 and 1935, and won the mixed doubles that year, his only Grand Slam title. He competed in the French Championships 19 times between 1927 and 1953, which is the third most appearances in history right after Fabrice Santoro (20) and Francois Jauffret (20). Boussus twice won the German Championships in Hamburg (1930, 1931) and the British Hard Court Championships on one occasion (1931). He was ranked number one French tennis player four times in a row in the consecutive years of 1934, 1935, 1936 and 1937.

Boussus was ranked World No. 9 in 1930 and 1935 by A. Wallis Myers of The Daily Telegraph, and the European No. 6 in 1931 (the latter by Züricher Sport newspaper).

== Playing style ==
At the peak of his career in 1932 his play was observed by Great Britain's then active Davis Cup player Nigel Sharpe who described him as the greatest French left-hander in the following manner: "He relies upon an all-round game with volleying as his forte. There is nothing of hurricane speed in his game. He takes the ball on the rise and hist his forehand with an easy swing and without much topspin. He gets good pace in this stroke and usually relies upon it as the forerunner of a volleying campaign[…]His backhand is of the cut variety but although putting so much slice on it he does not let it stop him from hitting it pretty hard. This stroke, of course, has its limitations, as it is distinctly difficult to make good passing shots against an agile volleyer. This wing is Boussus' chief weakness[…] (he) is able to make his volley down the line with great speed...but does not use his wrist quite so much". He further analysed his service game and found it be most unorthodox. Boussus completely omitted to swing his racquet behind his head while serving making his serves rather ineffective. Although this style was useful in overhead smashes when accuracy is more important than the speed. With this type of serve he also put a great spin to the ball and kept it relatively low. Later in his career he adapted to baseline play and utilized a series of dropshots in his games.

== Personal life ==
In his student ages he studied advertising. His 1930 season was interrupted because he had to fulfill his military service. While playing amateur tennis, he worked as a tire salesman in the meantime. Later he was appointed the director of communications for IBM France. Apart from his tennis playing style, he is known as the first man to wear shorts instead of pants on court. He was in a civil partnership with French parfume designer Germaine Cellier with whom he lived together for 30 years until she died in 1976. He died at the age of 95, the last surviving Musketeer. He had a brother Roland, also amateur tennis player, with whom he won the doubles title of the Le Touquet Spa Championships in 1937, while also winning the singles and mixed contest as well.

== Grand Slam finals ==
=== Singles (1 runner-up) ===
Result	Year	Championship	Surface	Opponent	Score
Loss	1931	French Championships	Clay	(France) Jean Borotra	6–2, 4–6, 5–7, 4–6

=== Doubles (1 runner-up) ===
Result	Year	Championship	Surface	Partner	Opponents	Score
Loss	1932	French Championships	Clay	(France) Marcel Bernard	(France) Henri Cochet (France) Jacques Brugnon	4–6, 6–3, 5–7, 3–6

=== Mixed doubles (1 titles, 1 runner-up) ===
Result	Year	Championship	Surface	Partner	Opponents	Score
Win	1935	Australian Championships	Grass	(Australia) Louie Bickerton	(Australia) Birdie Bond (South Africa) Vernon Kirby	1–6, 6–3, 6–3
Loss	1938	French Championships	Clay	(Australia) Nancye Wynne Bolton	(France) Simonne Mathieu (Socialist Federal Republic of Yugoslavia) Dragutin Mitić	6–2, 3–6, 4–6
