= Ian Collins (tennis) =

Scottish tennis player

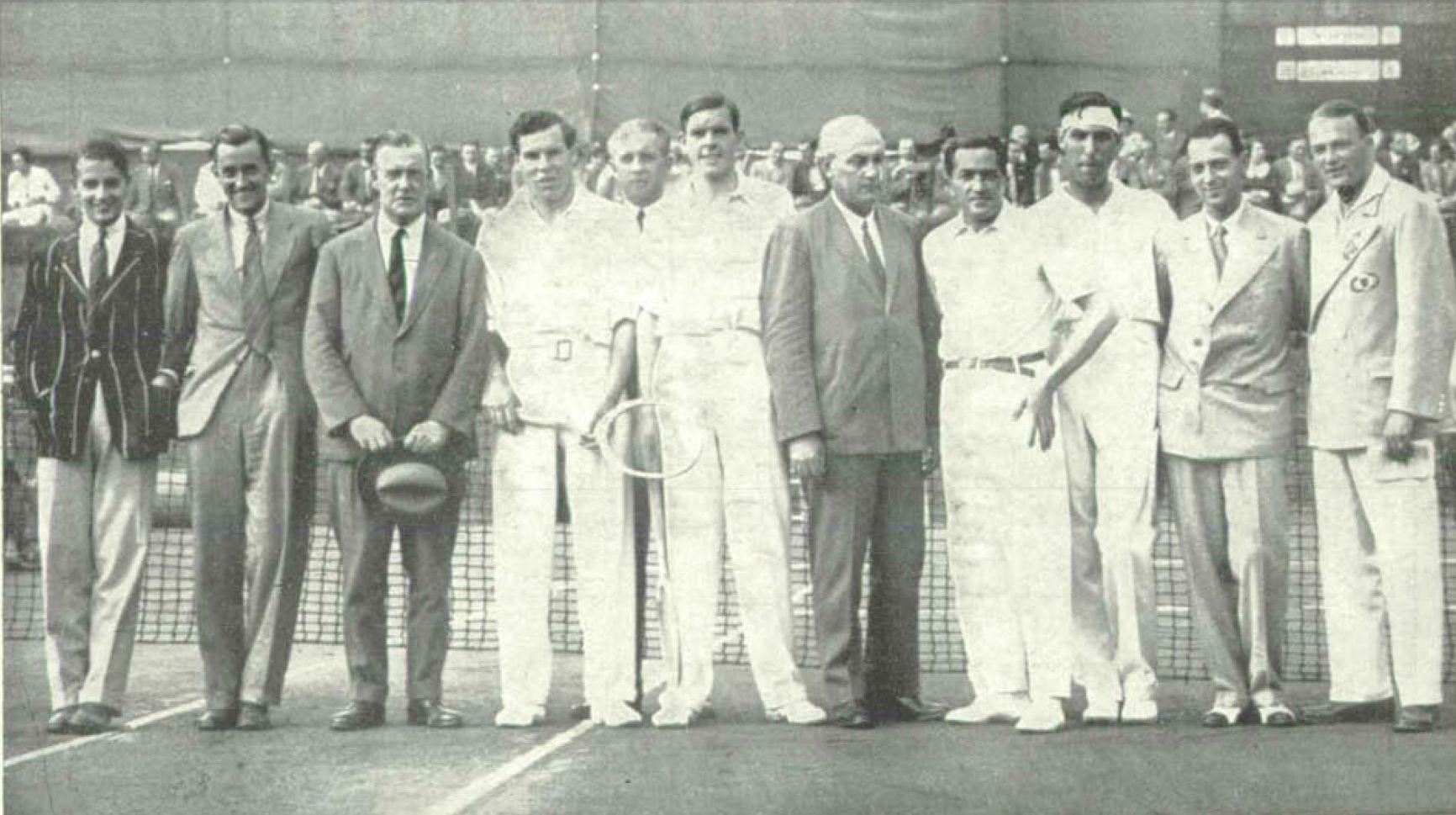
- Collins (sixth from left) in 1929
- Country (sports): (United Kingdom) Great Britain
- Born: 23 April 1903 Glasgow, Scotland
- Died: 20 March 1975 (aged 71) Bearsden, East Dunbartonshire

Singles
- Career record: 103–60 (63.1%)
- Career titles: 12

Grand Slam singles results
- Australian Open: 2R (1929)
- French Open: 3R (1929, 1930, 1931)
- Wimbledon: 4R (1931)
- US Open: 1R (1928)

Grand Slam doubles results
- Australian Open: F (1929)
- Wimbledon: F (1929)

Grand Slam mixed doubles results
- Australian Open: QF (1929)
- Wimbledon: F (1929, 1931)

Ian Glen Collins (23 April 1903 – 20 March 1975) was a Scottish tennis player who represented Great Britain in the Davis Cup.

Collins, primarily a doubles player, never fully recovered from a broken leg in his youth but still had a lengthy tennis career. It was said that due to the contortion he made when he served he looked like a "monkey mounting a pole". He had broken his leg soon after arriving at Magdalen College, Oxford, from Harrow School. Prior to Harrow, he was educated at Sandroyd School. While at Harrow he had appeared in every Eton v Harrow cricket match from 1919 to 1922. He played cricket for the university as a batsman and in 1925 appeared in a first-class match against Middlesex. Two years later he represented Scotland in a first-class match against Ireland.

In 1927 he made his Wimbledon debut, the first of 12 Wimbledon Championships that he entered. He missed the Championship in 1933 after injuring himself riding, but appeared in the event every other time until 1939.

His Davis Cup partnership with Colin Gregory proved successful as they were undefeated in their six matches together, in 1929 and 1930. They also combined in major tournaments and made the finals of both the Australian Championship and Wimbledon in 1929. Collins and Gregory lost to Jack Crawford and Harry Hopman in the Australian final in five sets, but beat them in the 1930 Davis Cup. They narrowly lost the Wimbledon final in another five setter, to Wilmer Allison and John Van Ryn. Collins was also a mixed doubles finalist in the 1929 Wimbledon Championship and again in 1931.

As a singles player, Collins had his best showing in 1930 when he reached the fourth round, before being eliminated by Bunny Austin. The following year he had the best win of his career when he defeated number one seed Henri Cochet in the second round of the 1931 Wimbledon Championship in four sets.

He won the Scottish Championships three consecutive times between 1926 and 1928, he was a finalist on six occasions between 1926 and 1936.

Collins is the great-great-grandson of publisher William Collins.

== Grand Slam finals ==
=== Doubles : 2 runners-up ===
Result	Year	Championship	Surface	Partner	Opponents	Score
Loss	1929	Australian Championships	Grass	(United Kingdom) Colin Gregory	(Australia) Jack Crawford (Australia) Harry Hopman	1–6, 8–6, 6–4, 1–6, 3–6
Loss	1929	Wimbledon	Grass	(United Kingdom) Colin Gregory	(United States) Wilmer Allison (United States) John Van Ryn	4–6, 7–5, 3–6, 12–10, 4–6

=== Mixed doubles : 2 runners-up ===
Result	Year	Championship	Surface	Partner	Opponents	Score
Loss	1929	Wimbledon	Grass	(United Kingdom) Joan Fry	(United States) Helen Wills (United States) Frank Hunter	1–6, 4–6
Loss	1931	Wimbledon	Grass	(United Kingdom) Joan Ridley	(United States) Anna Harper (United States) George Lott	3–6, 6–1, 1–6
