= Vernon Kirby =

South African tennis player

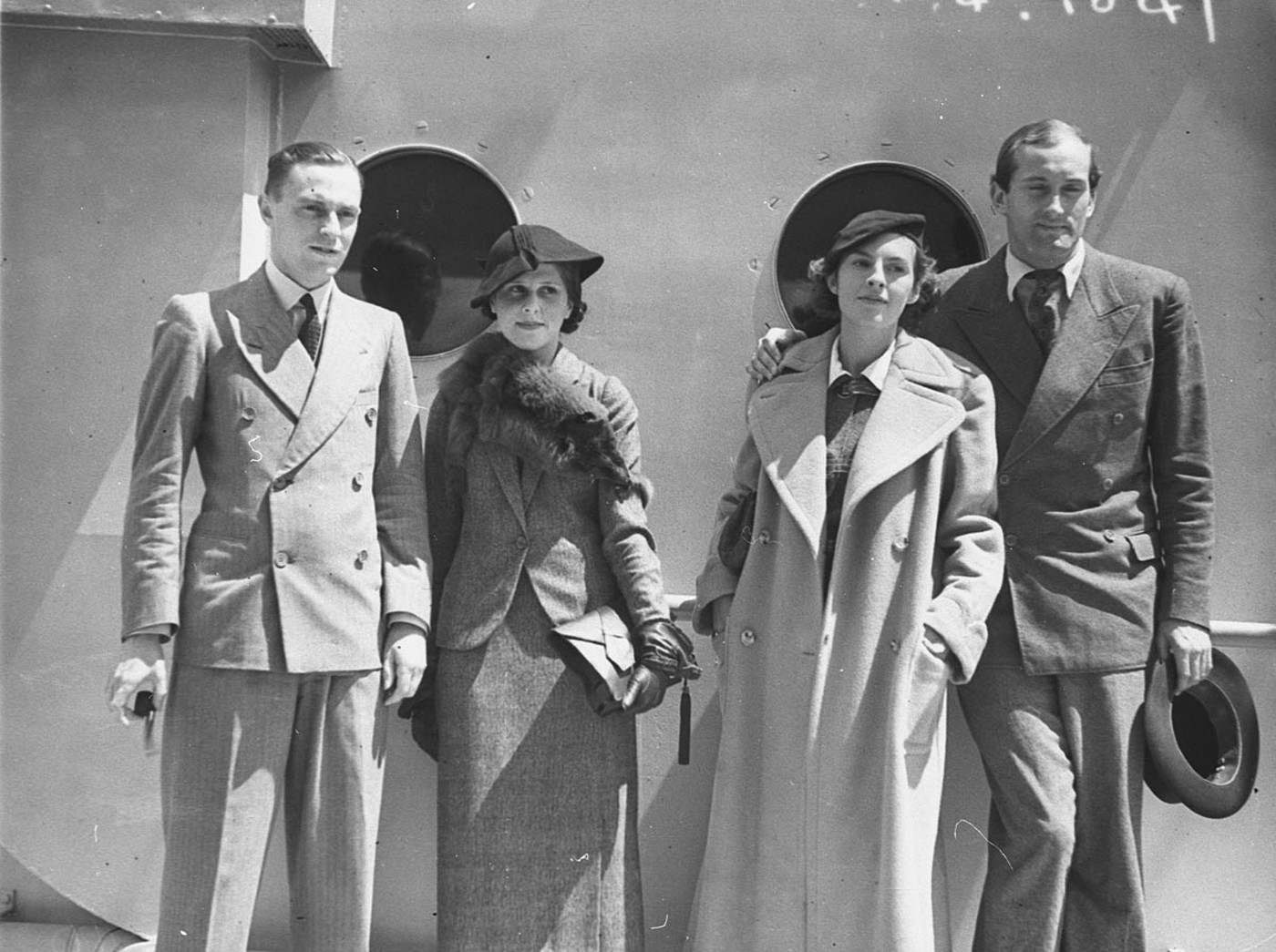
- Vernon Kirby (left) and Roderich Menzel (right) arriving to the 1935 Australian Championships
- Full name: Vernon Gordon Kirby
- Country (sports): South Africa
- Born: 22 June 1911; Durban, South Africa
- Died: 27 September 1994 (aged 83); Perth, Australia
- Height: 1.71 m (5 ft 7 in)
- Turned pro: 1931 (amateur tour)
- Retired: 1947
- Plays: Left-handed

Singles
- Highest ranking: No. 9 (1934, Literary Digest)

Grand Slam singles results
- Australian Open: 2R (1935)
- French Open: 3R (1937)
- Wimbledon: QF (1934)
- US Open: SF (1934)

Doubles

Grand Slam doubles results
- Australian Open: QF (1935)
- French Open: F (1931, 1937)
- Wimbledon: SF (1933)

Mixed doubles

Grand Slam mixed doubles results
- Australian Open: F (1935)
- Wimbledon: QF (1931, 1933)

Vernon Gordon 'Bob' Kirby (22 June 1911 – 27 September 1994) was a South African tennis player.

== Biography ==
Kirby was educated at the Durban High School where he played cricket and football. He started tennis at the age of five and played in his spare time while at school.

In May 1931 Kirby and his teammate and compatriot Norman Farquharson, were runners-up in the doubles final of the French Championships, losing in straight sets to the American pair George Lott and John Van Ryn. In July he won against George Lyttleton-Rogers in the final of the Wimbledon Plate, a tournament for players who were defeated in the first or second rounds of the singles competition at the Wimbledon Championships. Later in July Kirby beat his doubles partner in straight sets in the singles final of the Scottish Championships at Peebles. He also won the North of England Championships in Scarborough, North Yorkshire in singles and doubles.

In 1933 he won the Kent Championships and in January 1934 he was victorious in the Estoril tournament.

In 1934 Kirby reached the singles quarterfinal of the Wimbledon Championships but lost in four sets to American Sidney Wood. Later that same year at the U.S. National Championships he defeated future Grand Slam winner Don Budge in the fourth round to reach the semifinal in which he lost to eventual champion Fred Perry in four sets. In 1935 he reached the mixed doubles final of the Australian Championships with the Australian Birdie Bond. They were defeated by Australian Louise Bickerton and Frenchman Christian Boussus in three sets.

Kirby reached the singles final of the South African Championships on four occasions (1933, 1935, 1937, 1938). He was victorious in the doubles in 1931 and 1932.

He was ranked the third in the South African rankings in 1932 and World No. 9 in 1935 by J. Brooks Fenno Jr. of The Literary Digest. In 1937 he won the East Grinstead Open in England, the same year he was ranked No. 1 in South Africa.

Between 1931 and 1937 he played in ten ties for the South African Davis Cup team. The best team result was reaching the semifinal of the European Zone in 1935 against Czechoslovakia. Kirby had a Davis Cup match record of 16 wins vs. 8 losses and was more successful in doubles (7–1) than singles (9–7). Kirby died in September 1994 in Perth, Australia.

== Grand Slam finals ==
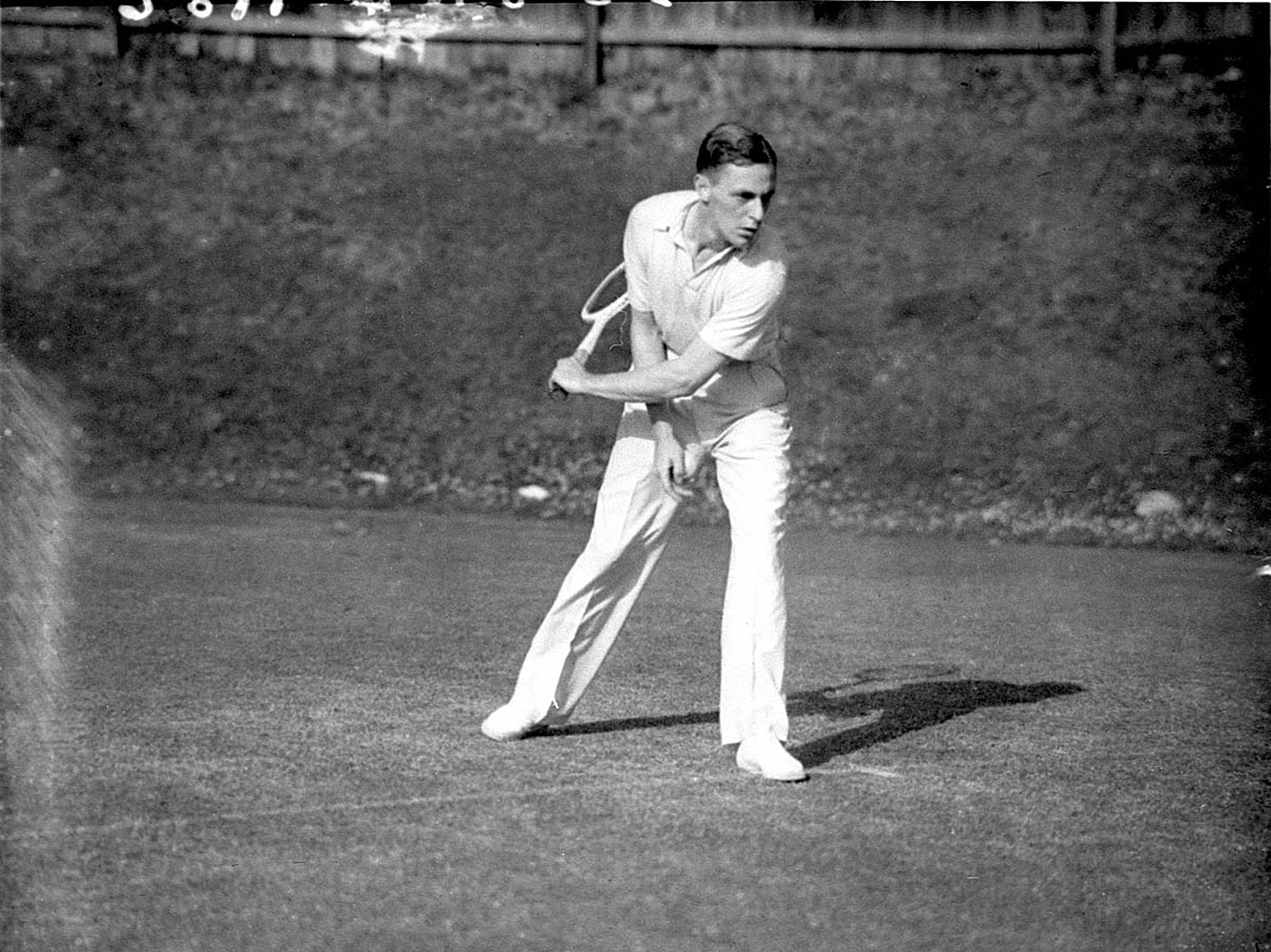
Vernon Kirby at the White City Stadium in Sydney, Australia in November 1934

=== Doubles (2 runners-up) ===
Result	Year	Championship	Surface	Partner	Opponents	Score
Loss	1931	French Championships	Clay	(South Africa) Norman Farquharson	(United States) George Lott (United States) John Van Ryn	4–6, 3–6, 4–6
Loss	1937	French Championships	Clay	(South Africa) Norman Farquharson	(Germany) Gottfried von Cramm (Germany) Henner Henkel	4–6, 5–7, 6–3, 1–6

=== Mixed doubles (1 runner-up) ===
Result	Year	Championship	Surface	Partner	Opponents	Score
Loss	1935	Australian Championships	Grass	(Australia) Birdie Bond	(Australia) Louie Bickerton (France) Christian Boussus	6–1, 3–6, 3–6
