= 1929 Australian Championships – Men's singles =

Men's singles
- 1929 Australian Championships

Final
- Champion: (United Kingdom of Great Britain and Ireland) John Colin Gregory
- Runner-up: (Australia) Richard Schlesinger
- Score: 6–2, 6–2, 5–7, 6–4

Details
- Draw: 32
- Seeds: 7

Events
Singles	men	women		boys	girls
Doubles	men	women	mixed	boys	girls
- Australian Championships

John Colin Gregory defeated Richard Schlesinger 6–2, 6–2, 5–7, 6–4 in the final to win the men's singles tennis title at the 1929 Australian Championships.

== Seeds ==
The seeded players are listed below. Colin Gregory is the champion; others show the round in which they were eliminated.

1. (Australia) Jack Crawford (quarterfinals)
2. (United Kingdom) Bunny Austin (quarterfinals)
3. (Australia) Harry Hopman (semifinals)
4. (United Kingdom) John Colin Gregory (champion)
5. (Australia) Richard Schlesinger (finalist)
6. (Australia) Jack Cummings (second round)
7. n/a (Note: Originally the seventh seed was Edward Higgs, but knee injury forced him to withdraw from entire tournament.)
8. (Australia) Edgar Moon (semifinals)

== Draw ==
=== Key ===
- Q = Qualifier
- WC = Wild card
- LL = Lucky loser
- r = Retired

=== Finals ===
Quarterfinals
1	(Australia) Jack Crawford	3	3	6	4
5	(Australia) Richard Schlesinger	6	6	2	6
3	(Australia) Harry Hopman	6	11	7
(Australia) Pat O'Hara Wood	2	9	5
8	(Australia) Edgar Moon	2	5	6	6	6
2	(United Kingdom) Bunny Austin	6	7	1	2	4
(Australia) Ernest Rowe	4	2	4
4	(United Kingdom) John Colin Gregory	6	6	6

Semifinals
5	(Australia) Richard Schlesinger	6	6	0	6
3	(Australia) Harry Hopman	2	1	6	2
8	(Australia) Edgar Moon	4	5	2
4	(United Kingdom) John Colin Gregory	6	7	6

Final
5	(Australia) Richard Schlesinger	2	2	7	4
4	(United Kingdom) John Colin Gregory	6	6	5	6

=== Earlier rounds ===
==== Section 1 ====
First round
1	(Australia) Crawford	6	6	6
(Australia) Little	4	3	0
(Australia) Moore	8	6	6	6
(Australia) Sweeting	10	2	3	3
5	(Australia) Schlesinger	6	6	6
(Australia) Harvey	0	1	3
(Australia) Thompson	6	6	6
(Australia) Cattanach	2	3	3
3	(Australia) Hopman	7	6	6
(Australia) Frankenberg	5	3	3
(Australia) Gar Hone	6	6	6
(Australia) Vincent	2	1	1
(Australia) O'Hara Wood	6	6	7
(Australia) James	2	1	5
(United Kingdom) Collins	6	6	6
(Australia) Dalgleish	3	1	0

Second round
1	(Australia) Crawford	6	8	6
(Australia) Moore	0	6	1
5	(Australia) Schlesinger	6	6	0	6
(Australia) Thompson	0	1	6	4
3	(Australia) Hopman	6	6	6
(Australia) Hone	1	0	1
(Australia) O'Hara Wood	6	4	6	6
(United Kingdom) Collins	3	6	1	4

Quarterfinals
1	(Australia) Crawford	3	3	6	4
5	(Australia) Schlesinger	6	6	2	6
3	(Australia) Hopman	6	11	7
(Australia) O'Hara Wood	2	9	5

Semifinals
5	(Australia) Schlesinger	6	6	0	6
3	(Australia) Hopman	2	1	6	2

==== Section 2 ====
First round
8	(Australia) Moon	6	6	6
(Australia) Walker	2	2	4
(Australia) McCracken	w/o
(Australia) Page
2	(United Kingdom) Austin	3	6	6	6
(Australia) Wertheim	6	4	2	1
(Australia) Cropper	w/o
(Australia) Turnbull (Note: Turnbull severely injured his thumb the preceding day in the Linton Cup final and had to withdraw from entire tournament.)
6	(Australia) Cummings	6	6	6
(Australia) Ray Hone	1	1	2
(Australia) Rowe	7	4	9	6
(Australia) Black	5	6	7	4
4	(United Kingdom) Gregory	6	6	6
(Australia) Manthorpe	3	2	1
(Australia) Hooper	6	6	6
(Australia) Ron Hone	3	3	2

Second round
8	(Australia) Moon	6	6	6
(Australia) McCracken	2	1	4
2	(United Kingdom) Austin	8	6	6
(Australia) Cropper	6	1	0
6	(Australia) Cummings	1	12	6	4	4
(Australia) Rowe	6	10	2	6	6
4	(United Kingdom) Gregory	6	6	6
(Australia) Hooper	1	3	4

Quarterfinals
8	(Australia) Moon	2	5	6	6	6
2	(United Kingdom) Austin	6	7	1	2	4
(Australia) Rowe	4	2	4
4	(United Kingdom) Gregory	6	6	6

Semifinals
8	(Australia) Moon	4	5	2
4	(United Kingdom) Gregory	6	7	6

== Notes ==
Preceded by 1928 U.S. National Championships	Grand Slam men's singles	Succeeded by 1929 French Championships
