= Nancy Lyle =

English tennis player (1910–86)

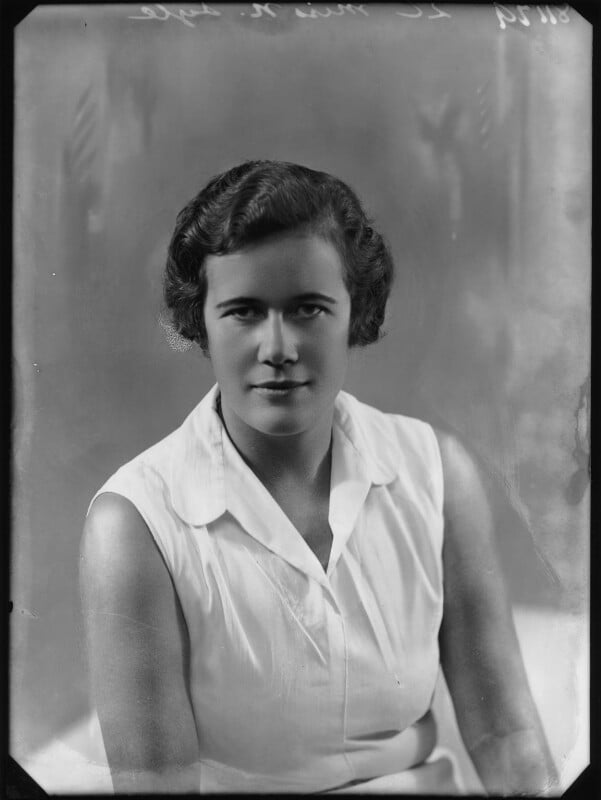
- Lyle in 1936
- Full name: Nancy Margaret Maltwood
- Country (sports): United Kingdom
- Born: February 26, 1910 London, England
- Died: 1986 (aged 75–76)
- Plays: Right-handed

Singles

Grand Slam singles results
- Australian Open: F (1935)
- French Open: QF (1934)
- Wimbledon: 3R (1933, 1935, 1938, 1939)
- US Open: QF (1935)

Doubles

Grand Slam doubles results
- Australian Open: W (1935)
- French Open: QF (1934)
- Wimbledon: QF (1934, 1935,1949)

Grand Slam mixed doubles results
- Australian Open: SF (1935)
- Wimbledon: 4R (1935)

The Honourable Nancy Lyle (February 26, 1910 – 1986) was a female tennis player from the United Kingdom who was active in the 1930s. Her married names were Glover and Maltwood.

== Early life and tennis ==
Nancy Margaret Lyle was born in London on 26 February 1910 and received education at St. Felix School in Southwold. She learned to play tennis from her father Leonard Lyle, 1st Baron Lyle of Westbourne, an industrialist and politician who had also competed at Wimbledon.

Lyle's biggest success at Grand Slam level came in 1935 when she partnered with Evelyn Dearman to win the doubles title at the 1935 Australian Championships, defeating Louie Bickerton and Nell Hall Hopman in the final in straight sets. Lyle and Dearman also won the doubles titles at the German Championships (1933) as well as the state championships of New South Wales and Victoria, Australia (1934).

She was a member of the British team at 1934 and 1935 Wightman Cup, the annual women's team tennis competition between the United States and Great Britain, and in both editions, she won her doubles match partnering Dearman.

== Grand Slam finals ==
=== Singles: (1 runner-up) ===
| Result | Year | Championship | Surface | Opponent | Score |
|---|---|---|---|---|---|
| Loss | 1935 | Australian Championships | Grass | (United Kingdom) Dorothy Round | 6–1, 1–6, 3–6 |

=== Doubles: (1 title) ===
| Result | Year | Championship | Surface | Partner | Opponents | Score |
|---|---|---|---|---|---|---|
| Win | 1935 | Australian Championships | Grass | (United Kingdom) Evelyn Dearman | (Australia) Louie Bickerton (Australia) Nell Hall Hopman | 6–3, 6–4 |

== See also ==
- Performance timelines for all female tennis players since 1978 who reached at least one Grand Slam final
