= Dorothy Round =

British tennis player (1909–1982)

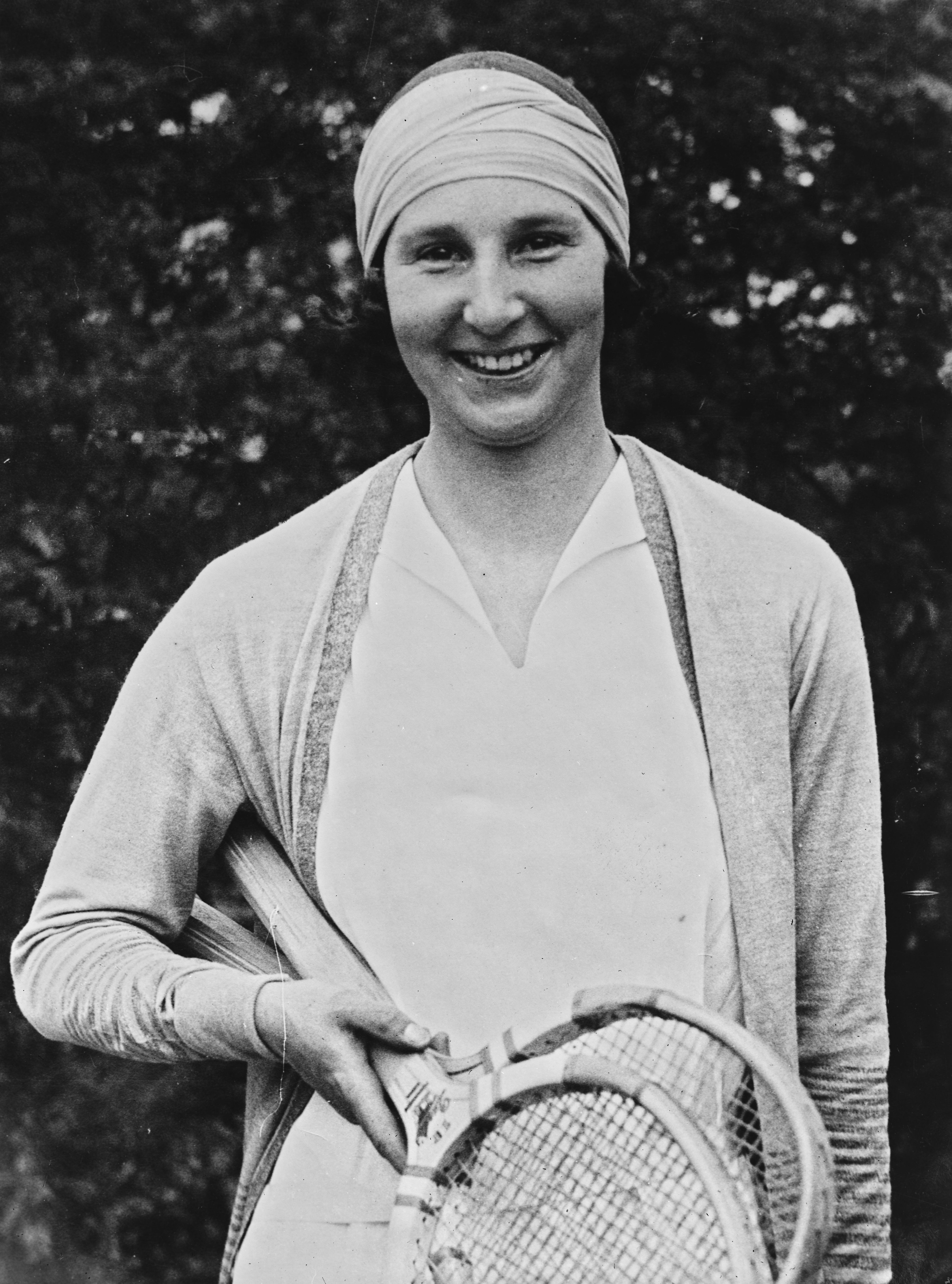
- Round in 1931
- Full name: Dorothy Edith Round
- Country (sports): United Kingdom
- Born: 13 July 1909 Dudley, West Midlands, England
- Died: 12 November 1982 (aged 73) Kidderminster, Hereford and Worcester, England
- Turned pro: 1927 (amateur circuit)
- Retired: 1950
- Plays: Right-handed (one-handed backhand)
- Int. Tennis HoF: 1986 (member page)

Singles
- Career record: 391-83 (82.5%)
- Career titles: 54
- Highest ranking: No. 1 (1934)

Grand Slam singles results
- Australian Open: W (1935)
- Wimbledon: W (1934, 1937)
- US Open: SF (1933)

Grand Slam doubles results
- French Open: SF (1930)
- US Open: F (1931)

Grand Slam mixed doubles results
- French Open: 3R (1930)
- Wimbledon: W (1934, 1935, 1936)

Dorothy Edith Round (13 July 1909 – 12 November 1982) was a British tennis player who was active from the late 1920s until 1950. She achieved her major successes in the 1930s. She won the singles title at Wimbledon in 1934 and 1937, and the singles at the Australian Championships in 1935. She also had success as a mixed doubles player at Wimbledon, winning a total of three titles. After her wedding in 1937, she played under her married name, Mrs D.L. Little. During the Second World War, she played in North America and became a professional coach in Canada and the United States. Post-war, she played in British regional tournaments, coached, and wrote on tennis for newspapers.

== Early life ==
Dorothy Round was born on 13 July 1909 in Dudley, West Midlands, England, the youngest of four children. She was the child of John Benjamin Round, a building contractor, and Maude Helena. Her family home in Park Road, Dudley, included a hard tennis court laid down by her grandfather. She was brought up as a Methodist, and her religion remained important to her throughout her life. According to an interview she gave in later life, she played tennis with her brothers at the court in the garden of the family home from an early age and entered a school tennis competition aged 10 or 11. Round attended the Dudley Girls High School.

== Career ==
=== Early career ===
Round entered her first tennis tournament when she was 16 when she appeared at a competition held at Pwllheli in Wales. In September 1925, Round entered the Junior Worcestershire Championships, and on 7 September 1925 she won the title, defeating Miss Lily Darby of Smethwick in straight sets. She retained the Worcestershire singles junior title the following year and added the doubles title at the same tournament. In September 1926, Round competed in the Junior Tennis Championships at Wimbledon, where she reached the semifinals. In June 1927, Round won three titles at the Worcestershire County Lawn Tennis Tournament, becoming the singles, doubles and mixed doubles champion.

=== First appearances at Wimbledon and other major tournaments ===
Round entered her first Wimbledon Championships in 1928 after coming through the qualifying event, and she was knocked out in the first round by Miss N. Trentham, 6–2, 6–8, 8–6. The following year, she suffered from nerves as she was defeated by Betty Nuthall in the second round. Later in 1929, her picture featured in the "Illustrated Sporting and Dramatic News" where she was billed as "a rising player". Round put in some impressive performances at the Wightman Cup trials held at Wimbledon in April 1930, defeating a number of established British players. In the same month, "Bunny" Austin one of the top British male players, called Round "a bright new star".

In 1930 she made her first tennis trip abroad, to the French Championships where she entered the doubles event, partnered with Mrs. Holcroft Watson and the mixed doubles event, partnered with Mr H.G.N. Lee. Her participation in the tournament resulted in a number of newspapers commenting on the possible difficulties caused by Round's refusal to play on Sunday because of her religious principles and the fact that the finals of the French Championships were played on that day. She reached the semifinals of the doubles, where the English pair were beaten by the French pair Mathieu and Barbier, 7–5, 7–5. She also reached the third round of the mixed doubles. In this year, it was reported that she was being coached by Dan Maskell.

At the 1931 Wimbledon Championships, she reached the quarterfinal stage for the first time after defeating fifth-seeded Lili Álvarez in the third round, and she was rewarded with a spot on the British team for the Wightman Cup, the annual women's team tennis competition between Great Britain and the United States, which in 1931 was held in August at Forest Hills. She lost her singles match against Anna Harper in three sets after failing to convert any of her seven matchpoints. Later in the same month, Round reached the doubles final of the U.S. National Championships at Forest Hill, where she was partnered with Helen Jacobs. The pair lost to Miss Betty Nuthall and Mrs. Fearnley Whittingstall, 6–2, 6–4. In a newspaper article from 1935, Round stated that it was her Wightman Cup loss that prompted her have more tournament play and she increased the number of tournaments that she played in to around 12 per season.

In 1932, she again reached the Wimbledon singles quarterfinal, losing to first-seeded and three-time Wimbledon champion Helen Wills Moody, 6–0, 6–1.

She declined to compete in the French Championships in 1933 because she did not want to play on a Sunday because of her religious convictions.

=== First Grand Slam singles final ===
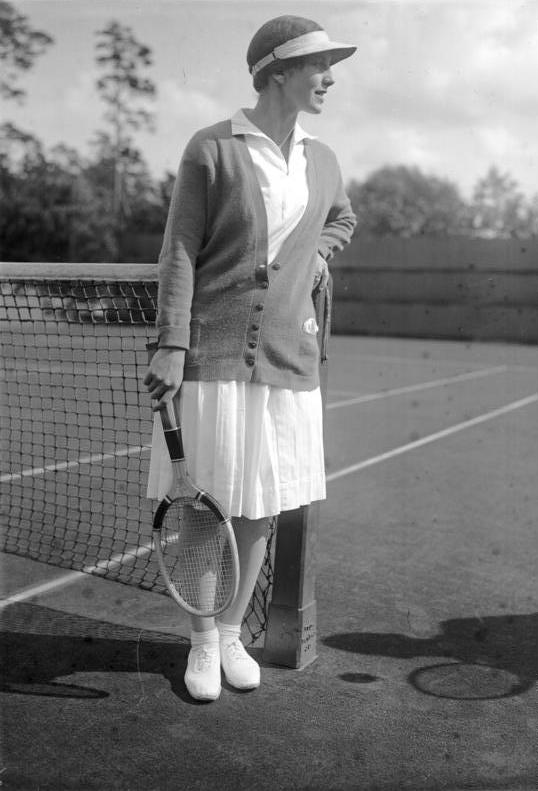
Helen Wills Moody was probably Round's most formidable tennis opponent.

In May 1933, Round scored a victory over Helen Jacobs in the final of the British Hard Court Championships, 3–6, 6–2, 6–3. At the 1933 Wimbledon Championships, she was seeded no. 2, and after a win against Helen Jacobs in the semifinal, she reached her first Grand Slam final. Wills Moody, now five-time Wimbledon singles title-holder, proved too strong, but Round managed to take a set from her, which was the first set Wills Moody lost in a Grand Slam final since 1925. (Note: After the final her hometown Dudley accorded her with a civic reception where she was presented with a platinum and diamond wristlet.) She proceeded with a tour to the United States where she competed in the 1933 Wightman Cup and won the singles title at the Eastern Grass Court Championships in Rye, beating compatriot Mary Heeley in the final. The result of the match, held on 12 August 1933, was 6–2, 6–4. Round competed in the 1933 Pacific Coast Championships, held in San Francisco, and was a runner-up to Alice Marble in the singles event but won the doubles event with partner Mary Heeley. In February and March 1934, Round travelled with a British team to the Jamaican Tennis Championships. She reached the singles final, losing to Helen Jacobs, 6–4, 6–1. The following May, Round retained her British Hard Court Championships single title in Bournemouth, beating Peggy Scriven in the final.

=== Grand Slam successes ===
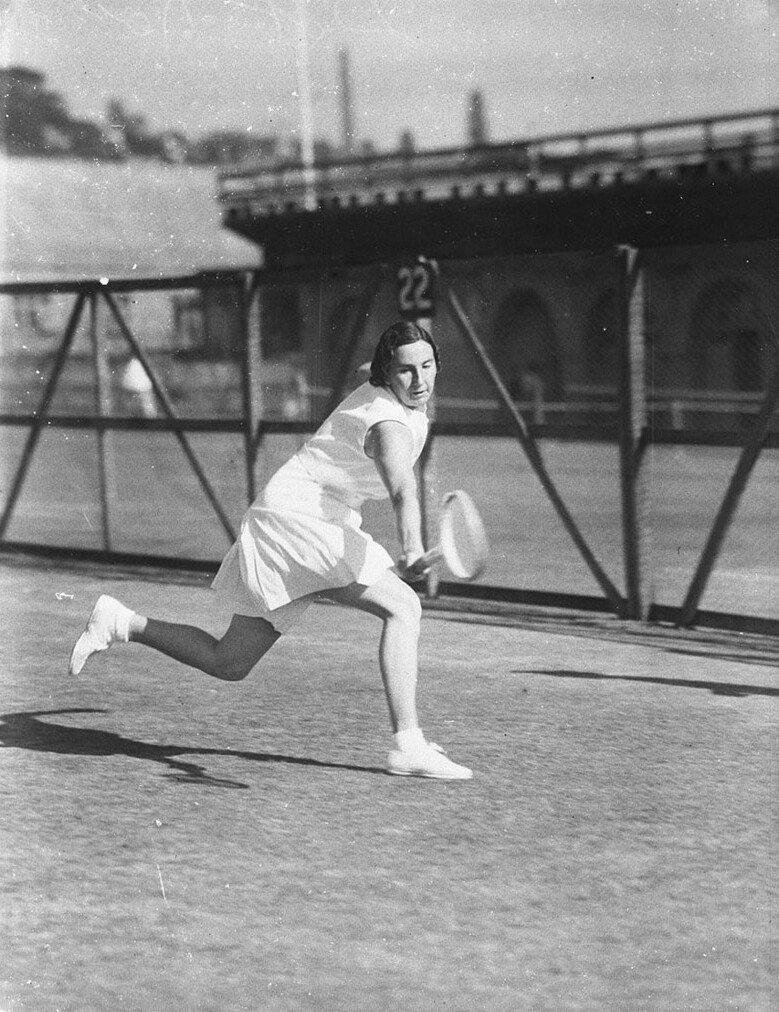
Dorothy Round practising at the White City Stadium in Sydney during her tour of Australia in 1934/5

Seeded number 2 in the 1934 Wimbledon Championships, she won the tournament, defeating sixth-seeded Lolette Payot in the quarterfinals and eighth-seeded Simonne Mathieu in the semifinals, and Helen Jacobs, 6–2, 5–7, 6–3 in the final. She also won the mixed doubles competition, partnered with Ryuki Miki.

In late 1934, Round was part of a British team that sailed to Australasia, arriving at Auckland on 2 November 1934 on board the Mariposa. After playing matches in New Zealand, the British team went to Australia in mid-November, where they were given a reception by the New South Lawn Tennis Association on 19 November 1934.

Round won the Victorian Championships, held in Melbourne, in December 1934 after a two-sets win in the final against Joan Hartigan. In January 1935, Round added the Australian Championships title to her Wimbledon one, beating compatriot Nancy Lyle in the final, 6–1, 1–6, 6–1. With this victory, Round became the first overseas player to win the Australian Championships.

Also in January 1935, Modern Lawn Tennis, her first instructional book on tennis, was published by George Newnes.

Round lost her Wimbledon singles title in the summer of 1935, defeated in the quarterfinals by Australian Joan Hartigan, 6–4, 4–6, 3–6. However, she retained her mixed doubles title in that year, partnered with Fred Perry. The pair beat Australians Nell Hopman and Harry Hopman, 7–5, 4–6, 6–2. In July 1935, it was reported that she had taken a post as a dress designer and sports wear adviser to a firm of outfitters.

Despite being the top seed in the singles of the Wimbledon Championships of summer 1936, Round lost in the quarterfinals, beaten by German Hilde Sperling. This match generated some controversy, when, during play, Round broke a shoulder strap. When Round requested permission to leave court to change, her opponent Sperling replied that she would prefer to keep on playing in case she got cold while waiting, forcing Round to carry on with the strap held by a safety pin. Despite the singles loss, Round retained her mixed doubles title, again partnered with Fred Perry. The pair defeated Don Budge and Sarah Fabyan, 7–9, 7–5, 6–4. In July 1936, a "lawn tennis experiment" was staged in the form of a match between Round and a top male player Bunny Austin. The match undertaken on "handicap terms" ended even at one set all.

In early 1937, Round was appointed to the National Advisory Council of Physical Fitness, tasked with improving the fitness of the nation.

Her second and final Wimbledon singles title came on 3 July 1937 when she defeated the Polish player Jadwiga Jędrzejowska 6–2, 2–6, 7–5.

According to A. Wallis Myers of The Daily Telegraph and the Daily Mail, Little was ranked in the world top 10 from 1933 through 1937, reaching a career high of World No. 1 in 1934.

=== Final Wimbledon appearance ===
Following her marriage in September 1937 and birth of her son in July 1938, Round took a break from tennis competition. In January 1938, Tennis for Girls Round's second instructional book, was published. In August 1938, Round presented a trophy that she had donated to the winner of the women's singles of the Pwllheli tennis tournament. In December 1938, it was reported that Round was planning a comeback to competitive tennis, but she stated that her participation at Wimbledon would depend on the progress she made during the year. She returned to tennis in 1939, appearing at the Herga Club's Tournament in Harrow at the end of March. She won her first tournament after her comeback on 13 April 1939, winning the Tally Ho! club's Easter tournament. Later in the year, she reached the fourth round in the singles and the third round of the doubles at Wimbledon. In August 1939, playing as Mrs Little in Pwllhelit, she won the Dorothy Round Challenge Cup.

In May 1940, Round won the doubles, partnered with Mrs. S H. Hammersley, at the Priory Lawn Tennis Tournament held at Edgbaston, Birmingham. In July 1940, Round announced that she was planning to go to Canada with her young son and that she was considering turning "pro" and doing some coaching.

=== Playing and coaching in North America ===
In July 1940, Round went to Canada with her two-year-old son Ian, and while there, she became a professional tennis coach. She also took part in competitions, exhibition matches and raised money for charity in Canada and the USA as well as promote the sale of War Bonds in the U.S.

In August 1940, Round won both the singles and doubles (partnered with Mrs Ross Harrington) in the Eastern Canada Championships held at Halifax, Nova Scotia.

Round turned professional in 1941 when she accepted a summer coaching position at the Seigniory Tennis Club in Canada. On 19 November of the same year, Round appeared in an exhibition match with Mary Hardwick in Durham, North Carolina.

In February 1942, Round was living on the campus of Lake Erie College, where she was coaching tennis players. She took over the coaching post from Mary Browne.

In June 1942, Round appeared with Mary Hardwick, Bobby Riggs and Wayne Sabin in a tennis exhibition held at the Edgemoor Club, Washington D.C. The event was to raise money for the British and American Ambulance Corps. At the event, Round was introduced to Dwight Davis, founder of the Davis Cup.

=== Her later playing career ===
In 1944, Round returned to the UK, where she performed exhibition matches. She was reinstated as an amateur in 1945 by the Lawn Tennis Association. There was speculation that she would return to Wimbledon in 1946, but, according to the contemporary player and sports journalist, John Olliff, former professionals could not appear at the Wimbledon Championships or at national championships organised under the jurisdiction of the International Lawn Tennis Association. However, Round remained an active tennis player, and after a break in 1946 when she had her second child, she continued to appear in British tournaments until the 1940s and later. In June 1947, it was announced that she would cover the Wimbledon Championships for the Liverpool Daily Post. In August 1947, she appeared at the Scottish Hard Court Championships, reaching the final of the singles and winning the doubles and mixed doubles titles. In July 1948, she appeared at the Midlands Counties Championship in Birmingham, where she lost the singles final to Barbara Knapp. In September 1949, Round was part of the Worcestershire team playing in the Inter-Counties Hard Court Tournament against a South Wales team. Round reached the third round of the singles in the Midland Counties Championships, held in Birmingham in 1950.

== Tennis-linked activities after finishing her playing career ==
In the 1953 and 1954, Round wrote articles for regional British newspapers, including a regular column titled "Dorothy Round on Tennis".

In 1963, Round coached tennis at Camp Aloha in Vermont. In the following year, she was coaching tennis at Halesowen Grammar School.

== Awards and honours ==
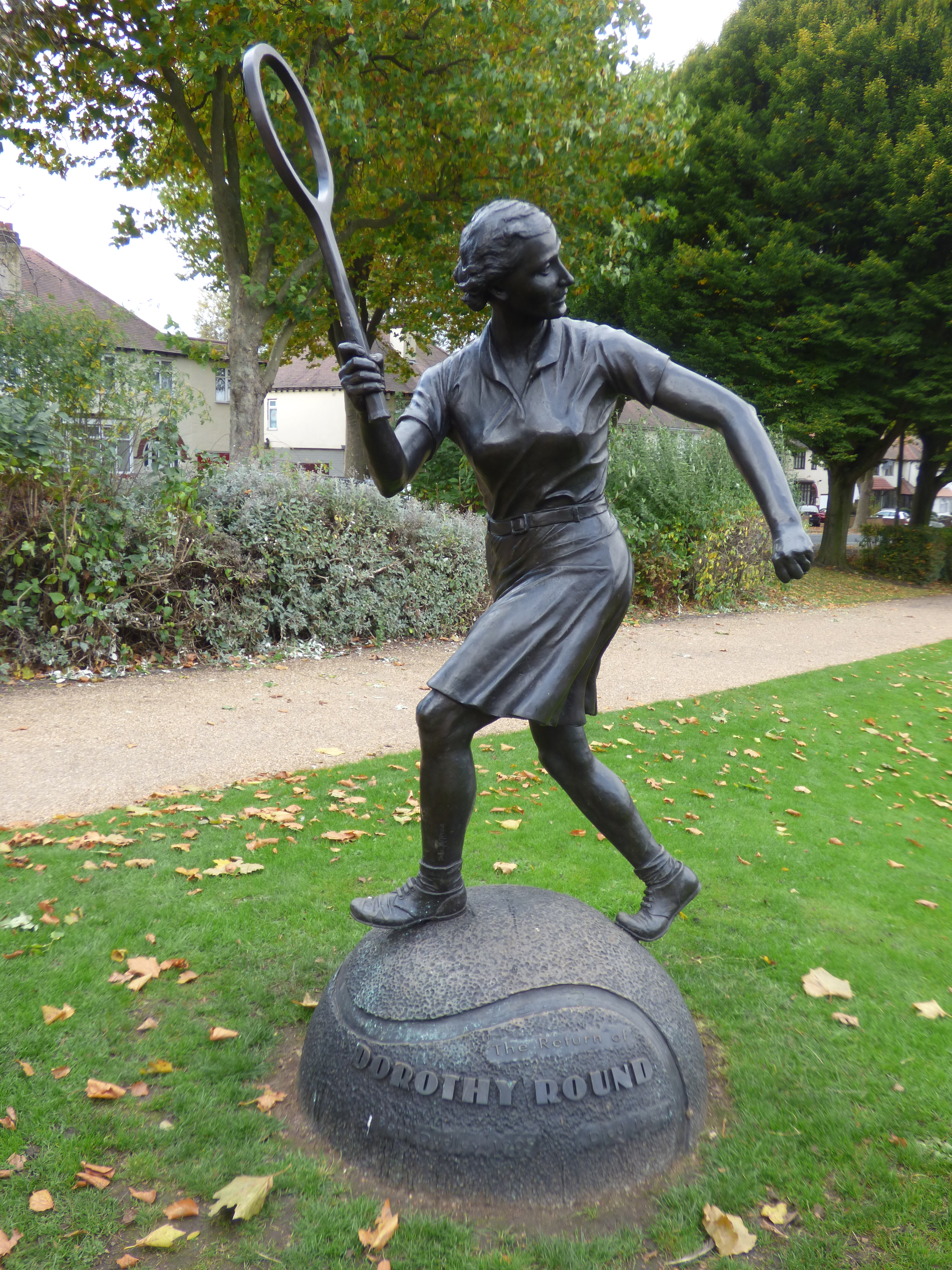
In 2013, a statue of Dorothy Round by sculptor John McKenna was erected in Priory Park, Dudley

She was inducted posthumously into the International Tennis Hall of Fame in 1986.

On 20 September 2013 her hometown of Dudley commemorated her by erecting a bronze statue in Priory Park, Dudley. The lifesize bronze statue, unveiled by her daughter, was created by the British sculptor John McKenna and depicts Dorothy Round making a return play of the ball. Also a portrait in oil on canvas by Dudley artist Philip Guest is part of the permanent collection of Dudley Museum and Art Gallery.

== Personal life ==
Dorothy Round's Methodist beliefs were important to her, and she continued to teach at a Methodist Sunday School in Dudley even at the height of her fame when she became Wimbledon champion in 1934. It was reported in 1934 that she was regularly at the baby welfare centre at Dudley, where she helped local mothers with babies. On 2 September 1937 she married Dr Douglas Leigh Little, a medical practitioner, at the Wesley Methodist Church in Dudley. The bridesmaid was the tennis player Mary Heeley, and the wedding dress was designed by Ted Tinling, who later became famous for creating sportswear for many of the post-war ladies' tennis champions. In July 1938, Round gave birth to a boy in Dudley. She went to Canada with her baby son in 1940, returning to the UK in 1944. She gave birth to a daughter, Patricia, in 1946. After Round's tennis playing career ended in 1950, she became a keen golf player and played in golf tournaments during the 1950s. On 4 April 1958, Round's husband died at their home in St. James Road, Dudley. In August 1958, she was appointed a justice of the peace in her home town of Dudley. Dorothy Round, who moved to Kinver, Staffordshire in 1970, died on 12 November 1982, aged 73, in Kidderminster.

== Grand Slam finals ==
=== Singles: 4 (3 titles, 1 runner-up) ===
Result	Year	Championship	Surface	Opponent	Score
Loss	1933	Wimbledon	Grass	(United States) Helen Wills Moody	4–6, 8–6, 3–6
Win	1934	Wimbledon	Grass	(United States) Helen Jacobs	6–2, 5–7, 6–3
Win	1935	Australian Championships	Grass	(United Kingdom) Nancy Lyle Glover	1–6, 6–1, 6–3
Win	1937	Wimbledon	Grass	(Poland) Jadwiga Jędrzejowska	6–2, 2–6, 7–5

=== Doubles: 1 runner-up ===
Result	Year	Championship	Surface	Partner	Opponents	Score
Loss	1931	U.S. National Championships	Grass	(United States) Helen Jacobs	(United Kingdom) Betty Nuthall (United Kingdom) Eileen Bennett Whittingstall	2–6, 4–6

=== Mixed doubles: 3 titles ===
Result	Year	Championship	Surface	Partner	Opponents	Score
Win	1934	Wimbledon	Grass	(Japan) Ryuki Miki	(United Kingdom) Dorothy Shepherd Barron (United Kingdom) Bunny Austin	3–6, 6–4, 6–0
Win	1935	Wimbledon	Grass	(United Kingdom) Fred Perry	(Australia) Nell Hopman (Australia) Harry Hopman	7–5, 4–6, 6–2
Win	1936	Wimbledon	Grass	(United Kingdom) Fred Perry	(United States) Sarah Fabyan (United States) Don Budge	7–9, 7–5, 6–4

== Grand Slam singles tournament timeline ==
Key
W	F	SF	QF	#R	RR	Q#	DNQ	A	NH

(W) winner; (F) finalist; (SF) semifinalist; (QF) quarterfinalist; (#R) rounds 4, 3, 2, 1; (RR) round-robin stage; (Q#) qualification round; (DNQ) did not qualify; (A) absent; (NH) not held; (SR) strike rate (events won / competed); (W–L) win–loss record.

Tournament	1928	1929	1930	1931	1932	1933	1934	1935	1936	1937	1938	1939	Career SR
Australian Championships	A	A	A	A	A	A	A	W	A	A	A	A	1 / 1
French Championships	A	A	A	A	A	A	A	A	A	A	A	A	0 / 0
Wimbledon	1R	2R	3R	QF	QF	F	W	QF	QF	W	A	4R	2 / 11
US Championships	A	A	A	3R	A	SF	A	A	A	A	A	A	0 / 2
SR	0 / 1	0 / 1	0 / 1	0 / 2	0 / 1	0 / 2	1 / 1	1 / 2	0 / 1	1 / 1	0 / 0	0 / 1	3 / 14

== See also ==
- Performance timelines for all female tennis players since 1978 who reached at least one Grand Slam final
