= Evelyn Dearman =

English tennis player

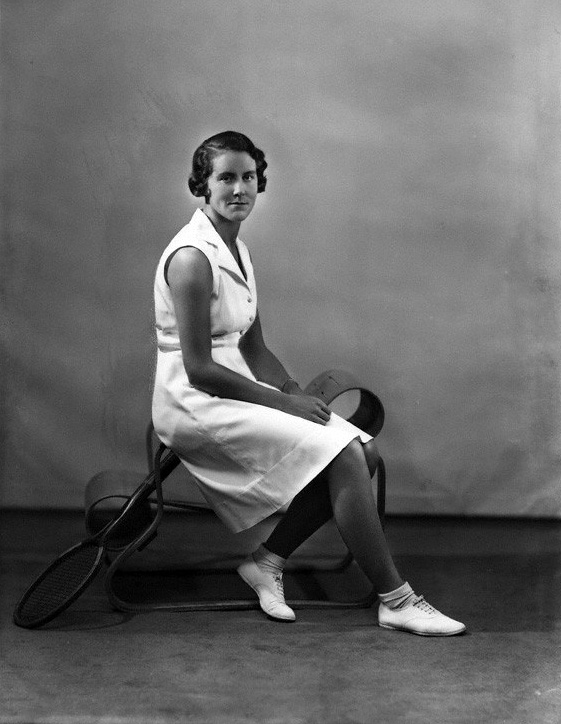
- Full name: Evelyn Mary Dearman
- Country (sports): United Kingdom
- Born: 8 September 1908
- Died: 2 December 1993 (aged 85)
- Plays: Right-handed

Singles

Grand Slam singles results
- Australian Open: QF (1935)
- French Open: 2R (1934)
- Wimbledon: 3R (1933, 1937)

Doubles

Grand Slam doubles results
- Australian Open: W (1935)
- Wimbledon: SF (1937)

Grand Slam mixed doubles results
- Australian Open: 2R (1935)
- Wimbledon: SF (1937)

Evelyn Dearman (8 September 1908 – 2 December 1993) was an English female tennis player who was active during the late 1920s and the 1930s.

Between 1927 and 1939 she participated in 13 Wimbledon Championships. Her best result in the singles event was reaching the third round in 1933 and 1937. In the doubles event Dearman reached the semifinal in 1937 partnering Joan Ingram. That same year she teamed-up with Daniel Prenn to reach the semifinal of the mixed doubles competition which they lost to the second-seeded pair Simonne Mathieu and Yvon Petra.

Her biggest success at Grand Slam level came in 1935 when she partnered with Nancy Lyle Glover to win the doubles title at the 1935 Australian Championships, defeating Louie Bickerton and Nell Hall Hopman in the final in straight sets.

In July 1937 she won the singles title at the Canadian Championships after a walkover in the final against compatriot Mary Hardwick. With Hardwick she also won the doubles title. From 1934 until 1937 Dearman was part of the British Wightman Cup team as a doubles player. These four editions were won by the United States.

== Grand Slam finals ==
=== Doubles: (1 title) ===
| Result | Year | Championship | Surface | Partner | Opponents | Score |
|---|---|---|---|---|---|---|
| Winner | 1935 | Australian Championships | Grass | (United Kingdom) Nancy Lyle | (Australia) Louie Bickerton (Australia) Nell Hall Hopman | 6–3, 6–4 |
