= Colin Gregory =

British tennis player

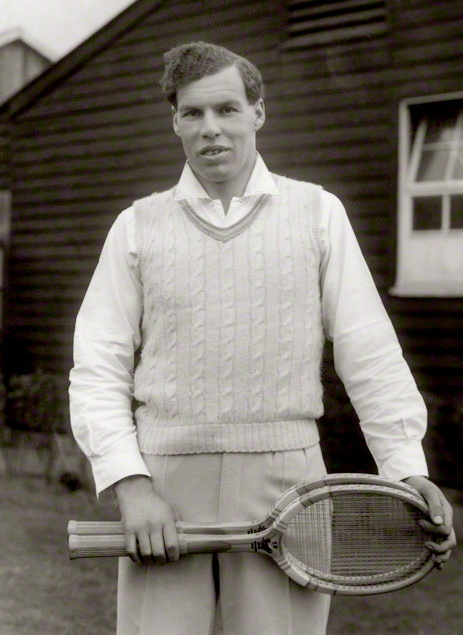
- Colin Gregory in 1932
- Full name: John Colin Gregory
- Country (sports): United Kingdom
- Born: 28 July 1903 Beverley, England
- Died: 10 January 1959 (aged 55) All England Club, Wimbledon, England

Singles

Grand Slam singles results
- Australian Open: W (1929)
- French Open: QF (1930)
- Wimbledon: QF (1926, 1930)
- US Open: 1R (1928)

Doubles

Grand Slam doubles results
- Australian Open: HF (1929)
- Wimbledon: F (1929)

Mixed doubles

Grand Slam mixed doubles results
- Australian Open: QF (1929)
- Wimbledon: SF (1929)

Team competitions
- Davis Cup: F^{Eu} (1926, 1929)

Doctor John Colin Gregory (28 July 1903 – 10 January 1959) was an amateur British tennis player, best remembered for winning the Australian Open in 1929.

Gregory was born in 1903 in Beverley, Yorkshire, the son of Dr William Herbert and Constance Gregory. Like his father, he became a medical doctor but was also a successful amateur lawn tennis player in both doubles and singles. Gregory also played cricket, golf, rugby and squash. In the 1920s he played doubles with Ian Collins and they were runners up at the 1929 Wimbledon Championships. In 1929 he won the Australian singles championship.

Following the Second World War, Gregory was captain of the British Davis Cup team. Due to an accident Geoffrey Paish was unable to play in a 1952 match against Yugoslavia and the 49-year-old Gregory stepped in to win the doubles match with Tony Mottram. Gregory became chairman of the All-England Club at Wimbledon in 1955, where he died in 1959 in the changing rooms following a match.

== Grand Slam finals ==
=== Singles: 1 title ===
Result	Year	Championship	Surface	Opponent	Score
Win	1929	Australian Championships	Grass	(Australia) Richard Schlesinger	6–2, 6–2, 5–7, 7–5

=== Doubles : 1 runners-up ===
Result	Year	Championship	Surface	Partner	Opponents	Score
Loss	1929	Wimbledon	Grass	(United Kingdom) Ian Collins	(United States) Wilmer Allison (United States) John Van Ryn	4–6, 7–5, 3–6, 12–10, 4–6
