= Louie Bickerton =

Australian tennis player

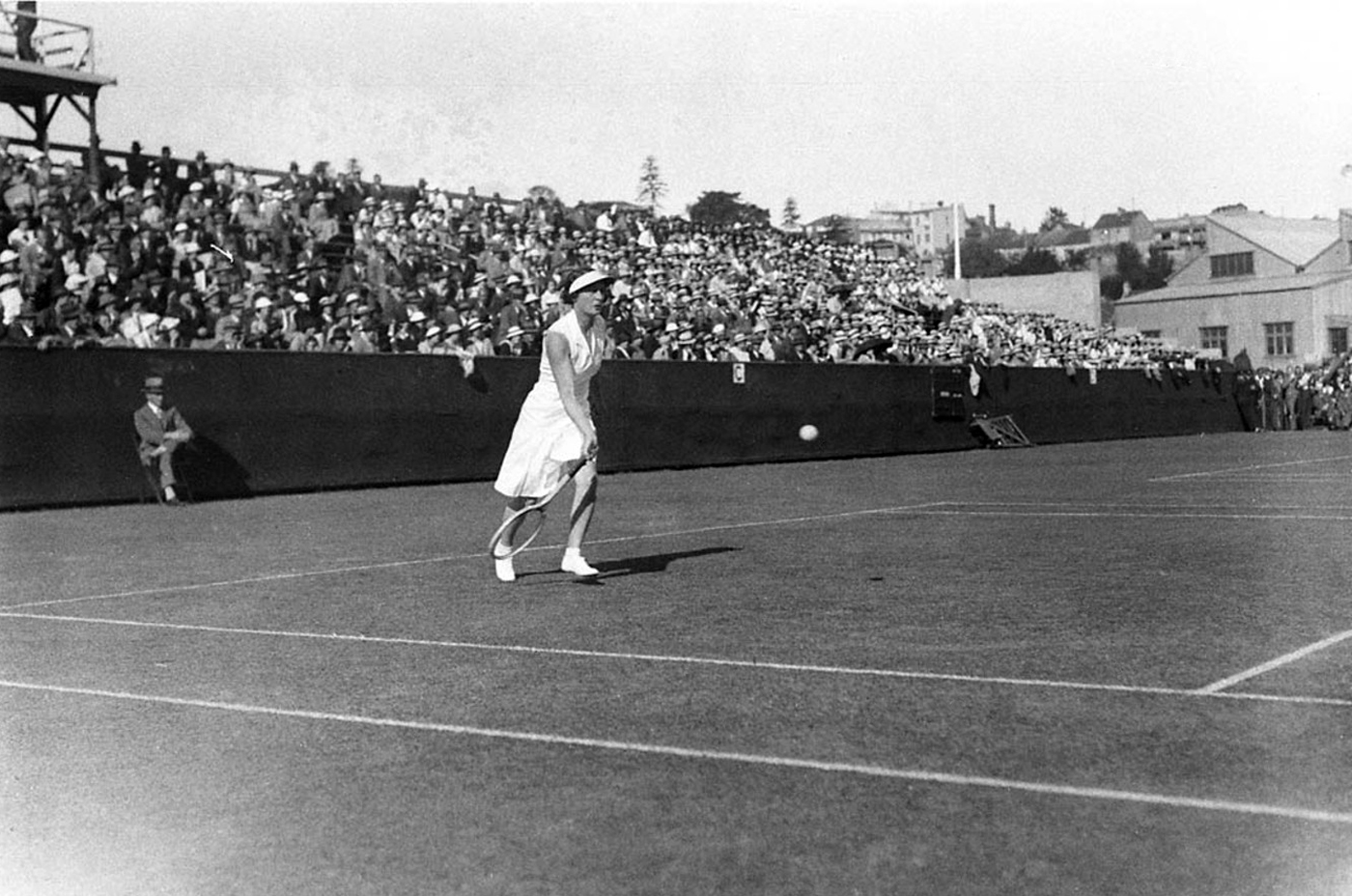
- Full name: Louie Mildred Bickerton Cozens
- Country (sports): Australia
- Born: 11 August 1902 Clifton Hill, Victoria, Australia
- Died: 6 June 1998 (aged 95)

Singles

Grand Slam singles results
- Australian Open: F (1929)
- French Open: 3R (1928)
- Wimbledon: 4R (1928)

Doubles

Grand Slam doubles results
- Australian Open: W (1927, 1929, 1931)

Grand Slam mixed doubles results
- Australian Open: W (1935)

Louie Mildred Bickerton Cozens (née Bickerton) (11 August 1902 – 6 June 1998) was a female tennis player from Australia. She was born in Clifton Hill, Victoria, Australia and won the women's doubles titles at the 1927, 1929, and 1931 Australian Championships. She won the mixed doubles title at those championships in 1935 and was the runner-up in the 1929 singles and 1935 women's doubles at that tournament.

Perhaps Bickerton's biggest singles victory outside of Australia was her first round defeat of 44-year-old and eight time U.S. champion Molla Bjurstedt Mallory in the first round of Wimbledon in 1928. The score was 6–3, 4–6, 6–4.

Bickerton was friends with Daphne Akhurst Cozens. In 1935 she married Daphne's widower, Royston Stuckey Cozens, to whom she remained married for 63 years until her death at the age of 95.

== Grand Slam finals ==
=== Singles (1 runner-up) ===
Result	Year	Championship	Surface	Opponent	Score
Loss	1929	Australian Championships	Grass	(Australia) Daphne Akhurst	1–6, 7–5, 2–6

=== Doubles (3 titles, 1 runner-up) ===
Result	Year	Championship	Surface	Partner	Opponents	Score
Win	1927	Australian Championships	Grass	(Australia) Meryl O'Hara Wood	(Australia) Esna Boyd (Australia) Sylvia Lance Harper	6–3, 6–3
Win	1929	Australian Championships	Grass	(Australia) Daphne Akhurst	(Australia) Sylvia Lance Harper (Australia) Meryl O'Hara Wood	6–2, 3–6, 6–2
Win	1931	Australian Championships	Grass	(Australia) Daphne Akhurst	(Australia) Nell Lloyd (Australia) Lorna Utz	6–0, 6–4
Loss	1935	Australian Championships	Grass	(Australia) Nell Hopman	(United Kingdom) Evelyn Dearman (United Kingdom) Nancy Lyle	3–6, 4–6

== Grand Slam singles tournament timeline ==
Key
W	F	SF	QF	#R	RR	Q#	DNQ	A	NH

(W) winner; (F) finalist; (SF) semifinalist; (QF) quarterfinalist; (#R) rounds 4, 3, 2, 1; (RR) round-robin stage; (Q#) qualification round; (DNQ) did not qualify; (A) absent; (NH) not held; (SR) strike rate (events won / competed); (W–L) win–loss record.

Tournament	1925	1926	1927	1928	1929	1930	1931	1932	1933	1934	1935	Career SR
Australian Championships	2R	A	SF	SF	F	SF	QF	A	A	SF	QF	0 / 8
French Championships	A	A	A	3R	A	A	A	A	A	A	A	0 / 1
Wimbledon	A	A	A	4R	A	A	A	A	A	A	A	0 / 1
U.S. Championships	A	A	A	A	A	A	A	A	A	A	A	0 / 0
SR	0 / 1	0 / 0	0 / 1	0 / 3	0 / 1	0 / 1	0 / 1	0 / 0	0 / 0	0 / 1	0 / 1	0 / 10

== See also ==
- Performance timelines for all female tennis players since 1978 who reached at least one Grand Slam final
