= 1938 in tennis =

This page covers all the important events in the sport of tennis in 1938. It provides the results of notable tournaments throughout the year on both the men's and women's ILTF tennis circuits.

== Australian Open ==
Category	Champion(s)	Finalist(s)	Score
Men's singles	(United States) Don Budge	(Australia) John Bromwich	6–4, 6–2, 6–1
Women's singles	(United States) Dorothy Bundy	(Australia) Dorothy Stevenson	6–3, 6–2
Men's doubles	(Australia) John Bromwich (Australia) Adrian Quist	(Germany) Gottfried von Cramm (Germany) Henner Henkel	7–5, 6–4, 6–0
Women's doubles	(Australia) Thelma Coyne (Australia) Nancye Wynne	(United States) Dorothy Bundy (United States) Dorothy Workman	9–7, 6–4
Mixed doubles	(Australia) Margaret Wilson (Australia) John Bromwich	(Australia) Nancye Wynne (Australia) Colin Long	6–3, 6–2

== French Open ==
Category	Champion(s)	Finalist(s)	Score
Men's singles	(United States) Don Budge	(Czechoslovakia) Roderich Menzel	6–3, 6–2, 6–4
Women's singles	(France) Simonne Mathieu	(France) Nelly Adamson	6–0, 6–3
Men's doubles	(France) Bernard Destremau (France) Yvon Petra	(United States) Don Budge (United States) Gene Mako	3–6, 6–3, 9–7, 6–1
Women's doubles	(France) Simonne Mathieu (United Kingdom) Billie Yorke	(France) Arlette Halff (France) Nelly Landry	6–3, 6–3
Mixed doubles	(France) Simonne Mathieu (Kingdom of Yugoslavia) Dragutin Mitić	(Australia) Nancye Wynne Bolton (France) Christian Boussus	2–6, 6–3, 6–4

== Wimbledon ==
Category	Champion(s)	Finalist(s)	Score
Men's singles	(United States) Don Budge	(United Kingdom) Bunny Austin	6–1, 6–0, 6–3
Women's singles	(United States) Helen Moody	(United States) Helen Jacobs	6–4, 6–0
Men's doubles	(United States) Don Budge (United States) Gene Mako	(Germany) Henner Henkel (Germany) Georg von Metaxa	6–4, 3–6, 6–3, 8–6
Women's doubles	(United States) Sarah Fabyan (United States) Alice Marble	(France) Simonne Mathieu (United Kingdom) Billie Yorke	6–2, 6–3
Mixed doubles	(United States) Don Budge (United States) Alice Marble	(Germany) Henner Henkel (United States) Sarah Fabyan	6–1, 6–4

== US Open ==
Category	Champion(s)	Finalist(s)	Score
Men's singles	(United States) Don Budge	(United States) Gene Mako	6–3, 6–8, 6–2, 6–1
Women's singles	(United States) Alice Marble	(Australia) Nancye Wynne Bolton	6–0, 6–3
Men's doubles	(United States) Don Budge (United States) Gene Mako	(Australia) Adrian Quist (Australia) John Bromwich	6–3, 6–2, 6–1
Women's doubles	(United States) Sarah Palfrey Cooke (United States) Alice Marble	(France) Simonne Mathieu (Poland) Jadwiga Jędrzejowska	6–8, 6–4, 6–3
Mixed doubles	(United States) Alice Marble (United States) Don Budge	(Australia) Thelma Coyne Long (Australia) John Bromwich	6–1, 6–2
