= 1937 Pacific Southwest Championships =

- Date: September 19–26
- Edition: 11th
- Category: Amateur
- Surface: Hard / outdoor
- Location: Los Angeles, California, U.S.
- Venue: Los Angeles Tennis Club

Champions

Men's singles
- (United States) Don Budge

Women's singles
- (United States) Alice Marble

Men's doubles
- (United Kingdom) Charles Hare / (United Kingdom) Pat Hughes

Women's doubles
- (United States) Dorothy Bundy / (United States) Dorothy Workman

Mixed doubles
- (United States) Helen Moody / (Nazi Germany) Gottfried von Cramm
← 1936 ·	Pacific Southwest Open	· 1938 →

The 1937 Pacific Southwest Championships was a combined men's and women's amateur tennis tournament played on outdoor hard courts at the Los Angeles Tennis Club in Los Angeles, California in the United States. It was the 12th edition of the tournament and took place from September 19 through September 26, 1937. Don Budge and Alice Marble won the singles titles.

== Finals ==
=== Men's singles ===
(United States) Don Budge defeated (Nazi Germany) Gottfried von Cramm 2–6, 7–5, 6–4, 7–5

=== Women's singles ===
(United States) Alice Marble defeated (United States) Gracyn Wheeler 7–5, 2–6, 6–4

=== Men's doubles ===
(United Kingdom) Charles Hare / (United Kingdom) Pat Hughes defeated (United States) Frank Shields / (France) Jacques Brugnon 6–4, 6–4, 6–2

=== Women's doubles ===
(United States) Dorothy Bundy / (United States) Dorothy Workman defeated (United States) Carolin Babcock / (United States) Marjorie Gladman Von Ryn 6–1, 0–6, 6–2

=== Mixed doubles ===
(United States) Helen Moody / (Nazi Germany) Gottfried von Cramm defeated (United States) Marjorie Gladman Von Ryn / (United States) Don Budge 6–1, 6–4
