= 1938 Australian Championships – Mixed doubles =

Mixed doubles
- 1938 Australian Championships

Final
- Champions: (Australia) Margaret Wilson (Australia) John Bromwich
- Runners-up: (Australia) Nancye Wynne (Australia) Colin Long
- Score: 6–3, 6–2

Details
- Draw: 23
- Seeds: 4

Events
Singles	men	women		boys	girls
Doubles	men	women	mixed	boys	girls
- Australian Championships

Nell Hopman and Harry Hopman were the defending champions and second seeds, but they lost in the quarterfinals.

In an all-unseeded final Margaret Wilson and John Bromwich defeated Nancye Wynne and Colin Long 6–3, 6–2, to win the mixed doubles tennis title at the 1938 Australian Championships.

== Seeds ==
1. (United States) Dorothy Bundy / (United States) Don Budge (quarterfinals)
2. (Australia) Nell Hopman / (Australia) Harry Hopman (quarterfinals)
3. (Australia) Thelma Coyne / (Australia) Jack Crawford (semifinals)
4. (United States) Dorothy Workman / (United States) Gene Mako (semifinals)

== Draw ==
Key

- Q = Qualifier
- WC = Wild card
- LL = Lucky loser
- Alt = Alternate
- ITF = ITF entry
- PR = Protected ranking
- SR = Special ranking
- SE = Special exempt
- JE = Junior exempt
- JR = Junior Accelerator Programme entrant
- CO = College Accelerator Programme entrant
- NG = Next Gen Accelerator Program entrant
- w/o = Walkover
- r = Retired
- d = Defaulted

=== Finals ===
Semifinals
(Australia) Margaret Wilson (Australia) John Bromwich	5	6	6
3	(Australia) Thelma Coyne (Australia) Jack Crawford	7	4	4
(Australia) Nancye Wynne (Australia) Colin Long	6	6
4	(United States) Dorothy Workman (United States) Gene Mako	2	3

Final
(Australia) Margaret Wilson (Australia) John Bromwich	6	6
(Australia) Nancye Wynne (Australia) Colin Long	3	2

=== Earlier rounds ===
==== Top half ====
First round
3	(Australia) Thelma Coyne (Australia) Jack Crawford	6	7
(Australia) Gwen Stevenson (Australia) Lionel Brodie	0	5
(Australia) May Hardcastle (Australia) Alfred Chave	3	6	6
(Australia) Nancy Chitty (Australia) Frank Walsh	6	3	2
(Australia) Dot Stevenson (Australia) Don Turnbull	6	4	6
(Australia) Dorothy Weston (Australia) Fred Bennett	0	6	1
(Australia) Jean Davies (Australia) Les Hancock	6	1	7
(Australia) Joan Walters (Australia) Cliff Harvey	4	6	5

Second round
1	(United States) Dorothy Bundy (United States) Don Budge	6	6
(Australia) Truda Cox (Australia) Tom Warhurst	2	2
(Australia) Margaret Wilson (Australia) John Bromwich	6	8
(Australia) Nina Vickery (Australia) Max Bonner	1	6
3	(Australia) Thelma Coyne (Australia) Jack Crawford	6	6
(Australia) May Hardcastle (Australia) Alfred Chave	0	3
(Australia) Dot Stevenson (Australia) Don Turnbull	6	7
(Australia) Jean Davies (Australia) Les Hancock	3	5

Quarterfinals
1	(United States) Dorothy Bundy (United States) Don Budge	0	2
(Australia) Margaret Wilson (Australia) John Bromwich	6	6
3	(Australia) Thelma Coyne (Australia) Jack Crawford	3	6	6
(Australia) Dot Stevenson (Australia) Don Turnbull	6	4	2

Semifinals
(Australia) Margaret Wilson (Australia) John Bromwich	5	6	6
3	(Australia) Thelma Coyne (Australia) Jack Crawford	7	4	4

==== Bottom half ====
First round
2	(Australia) Nell Hopman (Australia) Harry Hopman	6	6
(Australia) Eileen McGill (Australia) Jimmy McGill	1	0
(Australia) Connie Coate (Australia) George Holland	7	6
(Australia) Birdie Bond (Australia) Harold Whillans	5	1
(Australia) Emily Hood Westacott (Australia) Gar Moon	6	6
(Australia) Val Woods (Australia) Anthony Maggs	4	4

Second round
2	(Australia) Nell Hopman (Australia) Harry Hopman	6	6
(Australia) Connie Coate (Australia) George Holland	3	2
(Australia) Emily Hood Westacott (Australia) Gar Moon	13	3
(Australia) Nancye Wynne (Australia) Colin Long	15	6
4	(United States) Dorothy Workman (United States) Gene Mako	6	6
(Australia) Kath Woodward (Australia) Jack Clemenger	2	1
(Australia) Joan Hartigan (Australia) Arthur Huxley	3	9	6
(Australia) Gwen O'Halloran (Australia) Len Schwartz	6	7	2

Quarterfinals
2	(Australia) Nell Hopman (Australia) Harry Hopman	3	2
(Australia) Nancye Wynne (Australia) Colin Long	6	6
4	(United States) Dorothy Workman (United States) Gene Mako	6	6
(Australia) Joan Hartigan (Australia) Arthur Huxley	4	2

Semifinals
(Australia) Nancye Wynne (Australia) Colin Long	6	6
4	(United States) Dorothy Workman (United States) Gene Mako	2	3
