= 1938 Pacific Southwest Championships =

- Date: September 25 – October 4
- Edition: 12th
- Category: Amateur
- Surface: Hard / outdoor
- Location: Los Angeles, California, U.S.
- Venue: Los Angeles Tennis Club

Champions

Men's singles
- (Australia) Adrian Quist

Women's singles
- (United States) Dorothy Bundy

Men's doubles
- (Australia) Harry Hopman / (Australia) Leonard Schwartz

Women's doubles
- (France) Simonne Mathieu / (United Kingdom) Margot Lumb

Mixed doubles
- (United States) Sarah Palfrey Fabyan / (United States) Don Budge
← 1937 ·	Pacific Southwest Open	· 1939 →

The 1938 Pacific Southwest Championships was a combined men's and women's amateur tennis tournament played on outdoor hard courts at the Los Angeles Tennis Club in Los Angeles, California in the United States. It was the 12th edition of the tournament and took place from September 25 through October 4, 1938. Adrian Quist and Dorothy Bundy won the singles titles. The tournament finished two days behind schedule due to the late arrival of several players who participated in the U.S. National Championships.

== Finals ==
=== Men's singles ===
(Australia) Adrian Quist defeated (Australia) Harry Hopman 6–3, 0–6, 6–4, 6–4

=== Women's singles ===
(United States) Dorothy Bundy defeated (United States) Sarah Palfrey Fabyan 6–4, 6–4

=== Men's doubles ===
(Australia) Harry Hopman / (Australia) Leonard Schwartz defeated (Australia) John Bromwich / (Australia) Adrian Quist 3–6, 6–2, 6–4, 6–4

=== Women's doubles ===
(France) Simonne Mathieu / (United Kingdom) Margot Lumb defeated (United States) Sarah Palfrey Fabyan / (United States) Gracyn Wheeler 6–2, 6–3

=== Mixed doubles ===
(United States) Sarah Palfrey Fabyan / (United States) Don Budge defeated (Australia) Nell Hopman / (Australia) Harry Hopman 3–6, 6–3, 10–8
