= 1938 Australian Championships – Men's doubles =

Men's doubles
- 1938 Australian Championships

Final
- Champions: (Australia) John Bromwich (Australia) Adrian Quist
- Runners-up: (Germany) Gottfried von Cramm (Germany) Henner Henkel
- Score: 7–5, 6–4, 6–0

Details
- Draw: 16
- Seeds: 4

Events
Singles	men	women		boys	girls
Doubles	men	women	mixed	boys	girls
← 1937 ·	Australian Championships	· 1939 →

The third seeds John Bromwich and Adrian Quist defeated Gottfried von Cramm and Henner Henkel 7–5, 6–4, 6–0 in the final, to win the men's doubles tennis title at the 1938 Australian Championships.

This win marked the start of a record eight consecutive Australian Men's Doubles titles streak for the pair formed only recently at the request of the Australian Lawn Tennis Association.

== Seeds ==
1. (United States) Don Budge / (United States) Gene Mako (semifinals)
2. (Germany) Gottfried von Cramm / (Germany) Henner Henkel (final)
3. (Australia) John Bromwich / (Australia) Adrian Quist (champions)
4. (Australia) Jack Crawford / (Australia) Vivian McGrath (semifinals)

== Draw ==
=== Key ===
- Q = Qualifier
- WC = Wild card
- LL = Lucky loser
- Alt = Alternate
- ITF = ITF entry
- PR = Protected ranking
- SR = Special ranking
- SE = Special exempt
- JE = Junior exempt
- JR = Junior Accelerator Programme entrant
- CO = College Accelerator Programme entrant
- NG = Next Gen Accelerator Program entrant
- w/o = Walkover
- r = Retired
- d = Defaulted

=== Draw ===
First round
1	(United States) Don Budge (United States) Gene Mako	6	6	6
(Australia) Dinny Pails (Australia) Bill Sidwell	1	2	2
(Australia) Arthur Huxley (Australia) Don Turnbull	6	6	6
(Australia) George Holland (Germany) Heinrich Kleinschroth	3	3	3
3	(Australia) John Bromwich (Australia) Adrian Quist	6	6	7
(Australia) Lionel Brodie (Australia) Tom Warhurst	3	3	5
(Australia) Gar Hone (Australia) Max Newcombe	6	7	6
(Australia) Gar Moon (Australia) Harold Whillans	2	5	4
4	(Australia) Jack Crawford (Australia) Vivian McGrath	6	6	4	6
(Australia) William F. Stephen (Australia) Norman Wasley	3	3	6	2
(Australia) Harry Hopman (Australia) Len Schwartz	6	3	6	6	6
(Australia) Fred Bennett (Australia) Jim Gilchrist	1	6	3	8	2
2	(Germany) Gottfried von Cramm (Germany) Henner Henkel	9	4	6	6
(Australia) Les Hancock (Australia) Colin Long	7	6	1	4
(Australia) Jack Clemenger (Australia) Jack Harper	6	6	8	6
(Australia) Max Bonner (Australia) Albert Maggs	8	3	6	4

Quarterfinals
1	(United States) Don Budge (United States) Gene Mako	6	6	6
(Australia) Arthur Huxley (Australia) Don Turnbull	2	4	4
3	(Australia) John Bromwich (Australia) Adrian Quist	6	6	8
(Australia) Gar Hone (Australia) Max Newcombe	2	4	6
4	(Australia) Jack Crawford (Australia) Vivian McGrath	6	6	6
(Australia) Harry Hopman (Australia) Len Schwartz	1	2	4
2	(Germany) Gottfried von Cramm (Germany) Henner Henkel	4	6	1	6	14
(Australia) Jack Clemenger (Australia) Jack Harper	6	3	6	3	12

Semifinals
1	(United States) Don Budge (United States) Gene Mako	6	6	3	4	1
3	(Australia) John Bromwich (Australia) Adrian Quist	3	4	6	6	6
4	(Australia) Jack Crawford (Australia) Vivian McGrath	1	3	6	5
2	(Germany) Gottfried von Cramm (Germany) Henner Henkel	6	6	4	7

Final
3	(Australia) John Bromwich (Australia) Adrian Quist	7	6	6
2	(Germany) Gottfried von Cramm (Germany) Henner Henkel	5	4	0
