= 1938 Australian Championships =

- Date: 21–31 January 1938
- Edition: 31st
- Category: Grand Slam (ITF)
- Surface: Grass
- Location: Adelaide, Australia
- Venue: Memorial Drive

Champions

Men's singles
- (United States) Don Budge

Women's singles
- (United States) Dorothy Bundy

Men's doubles
- (Australia) John Bromwich / (Australia) Adrian Quist

Women's doubles
- (Australia) Thelma Coyne / (Australia) Nancye Wynne

Mixed doubles
- (Australia) Margaret Wilson / (Australia) John Bromwich

Boys' singles
- (Australia) Max Newcombe

Girls' singles
- (Australia) Joyce Wood

Boys' doubles
- (Australia) Dinny Pails / (Australia) Bill Sidwell

Girls' doubles
- (Australia) Alison Burton / (Australia) Joyce Wood
- Australian Championships

The 1938 Australian Championships was a tennis tournament that took place on outdoor Grass courts at the Memorial Drive, Adelaide, Australia from 21 January to 31 January. It was the 31st edition of the Australian Championships (now known as the Australian Open), the 7th held in Adelaide, and the first Grand Slam tournament of the year. The singles titles were won by Americans Don Budge and Dorothy Bundy Cheney.

== Finals ==
=== Men's singles ===
(United States) Don Budge defeated (Australia) John Bromwich 6–4, 6–2, 6–1

=== Women's singles ===
(United States) Dorothy Bundy defeated (Australia) Dorothy Stevenson 6–3, 6–2

=== Men's doubles ===
(Australia) John Bromwich / (Australia) Adrian Quist defeated (Germany) Gottfried von Cramm / (Germany) Henner Henkel 7–5, 6–4, 6–0

=== Women's doubles ===
(Australia) Thelma Coyne / (Australia) Nancye Wynne defeated (United States) Dorothy Bundy / (United States) Dorothy Workman 9–7, 6–4

=== Mixed doubles ===
(Australia) Margaret Wilson / (Australia) John Bromwich defeated (Australia) Nancye Wynne / (Australia) Colin Long 6–3, 6–2

Preceded by 1937 U.S. National Championships	Grand Slams	Succeeded by 1938 French Championships
