= 1938 Australian Championships – Women's doubles =

Women's doubles
- 1938 Australian Championships

Final
- Champions: (Australia) Thelma Coyne (Australia) Nancye Wynne
- Runners-up: (United States) Dorothy Bundy (United States) Dorothy Workman
- Score: 9–7, 6–4

Details
- Draw: 13
- Seeds: 4

Events
Singles	men	women		boys	girls
Doubles	men	women	mixed	boys	girls
- Australian Championships

Thelma Coyne and Nancye Wynne claimed their third consecutive domestic title, defeating Dorothy Bundy and Dorothy Workman 9–7, 6–4 in the final, to win the women's doubles tennis title at the 1938 Australian Championships.

== Seeds ==
1. (United States) Dorothy Bundy / (United States) Dorothy Workman (final)
2. (Australia) Thelma Coyne / (Australia) Nancye Wynne (champions)
3. (Australia) Nell Hopman / (Australia) Dot Stevenson (quarterfinals)
4. (Australia) Joan Hartigan / (Australia) Emily Hood Westacott (semifinals)

== Draw ==
Key

- Q = Qualifier
- WC = Wild card
- LL = Lucky loser
- Alt = Alternate
- ITF = ITF entry
- PR = Protected ranking
- SR = Special ranking
- SE = Special exempt
- JE = Junior exempt
- JR = Junior Accelerator Programme entrant
- CO = College Accelerator Programme entrant
- NG = Next Gen Accelerator Program entrant
- w/o = Walkover
- r = Retired
- d = Defaulted

=== Draw ===
First round
(Australia) Birdie Bond (Australia) Nina Vickery	6	4	6
(Australia) Nancy Chitty (Australia) Truda Cox	1	6	2
3	(Australia) Nell Hopman (Australia) Dot Stevenson	7	6
(Australia) Joan Walters (Australia) Dorothy Weston	5	2
(Australia) May Hardcastle (Australia) Gwen O'Halloran	6	6
(Australia) Ruby Skinner (Australia) Val Woods	3	2
1	(United States) Dorothy Bundy (United States) Dorothy Workman	6	8
(Australia) Doris Mauger (Australia) Gwen Stevenson	1	6
(Australia) Connie Coate (Australia) Kath Woodward	6	6
(Australia) Dorn McGill (Australia) Eileen McGill	0	1

Quarterfinals
2	(Australia) Thelma Coyne (Australia) Nancye Wynne	6	6
(Australia) Birdie Bond (Australia) Nina Vickery	3	2
3	(Australia) Nell Hopman (Australia) Dot Stevenson	3	4
(Australia) May Hardcastle (Australia) Gwen O'Halloran	6	6
1	(United States) Dorothy Bundy (United States) Dorothy Workman	6	6
(Australia) Connie Coate (Australia) Kath Woodward	1	4
4	(Australia) Joan Hartigan (Australia) Emily Hood Westacott	6	3	6
(Australia) Jean Davies (Australia) Margaret Wilson	1	6	2

Semifinals
2	(Australia) Thelma Coyne (Australia) Nancye Wynne	6	6
(Australia) May Hardcastle (Australia) Gwen O'Halloran	2	1
1	(United States) Dorothy Bundy (United States) Dorothy Workman	7	6	6
4	(Australia) Joan Hartigan (Australia) Emily Hood Westacott	5	8	4

Final
2	(Australia) Thelma Coyne (Australia) Nancye Wynne	9	6
1	(United States) Dorothy Bundy (United States) Dorothy Workman	7	4
