= 1938 Australian Championships – Women's singles =

Women's singles
- 1938 Australian Championships

Final
- Champion: (United States) Dorothy Bundy
- Runner-up: (Australia) Dorothy Stevenson
- Score: 6–3, 6–2

Details
- Draw: 24
- Seeds: 8

Events
Singles	men	women		boys	girls
Doubles	men	women	mixed	boys	girls
- Australian Championships

First-seeded Dorothy Bundy defeated Dorothy Stevenson 6–3, 6–2, in the final to win the women's singles tennis title at the 1938 Australian Championships.

== Seeds ==
The seeded players are listed below. Dorothy Bundy is the champion; others show the round in which they were eliminated.

1. (United States) Dorothy Bundy (champion)
2. (Australia) Nancye Wynne (semifinals)
3. (Australia) Thelma Coyne (quarterfinals)
4. (Australia) Joan Hartigan (quarterfinals)
5. (Australia) Nell Hopman (semifinals)
6. (Australia) May Hardcastle (quarterfinals)
7. (Australia) Dorothy Stevenson (finalist)
8. (United States) Do Workman (quarterfinals)

== Draw ==
=== Key ===
- Q = Qualifier
- WC = Wild card
- LL = Lucky loser
- r = Retired

=== Finals ===
Quarterfinals
1	(United States) Dorothy Bundy	6	6
6	(Australia) May Hardcastle	3	4
3	(Australia) Thelma Coyne	4	2
5	(Australia) Nell Hopman	6	6
2	(Australia) Nancye Wynne	6	6
8	(United States) Dorothy Workman	4	3
4	(Australia) Joan Hartigan	3	6	1
7	(Australia) Dorothy Stevenson	6	1	6

Semifinals
1	(United States) Dorothy Bundy	6	6
5	(Australia) Nell Hopman	2	3
2	(Australia) Nancye Wynne	3	3
7	(Australia) Dorothy Stevenson	6	6

Finals
1	(United States) Dorothy Bundy	6	6
7	(Australia) Dorothy Stevenson	3	2

=== Earlier rounds ===
==== Section 1 ====
First round
3	(Australia) Coyne	6	6
(Australia) Woods	2	0
(Australia) O'Halloran
(Australia) Cox	w/o
5	(Australia) Hopman	6	6
(Australia) Stern	1	2
(Australia) Mauger	6	0	6
(Australia) Coate	1	6	4

Second round
1	(United States) Bundy	6	8
(Australia) Walters	3	6
6	(Australia) Hardcastle
(Australia) Blick	w/o
3	(Australia) Coyne	6	6
(Australia) O'Halloran	3	4
5	(Australia) Hopman	6	6
(Australia) Mauger	2	1

Quarterfinals
1	(United States) Bundy	6	6
6	(Australia) Hardcastle	3	4
3	(Australia) Coyne	4	2
5	(Australia) Hopman	6	6

Semifinals
1	(United States) Bundy	6	6
5	(Australia) Hopman	2	3

==== Section 2 ====
First round
2	(Australia) Wynne	6	6
(Australia) Weston	2	1
(Australia) Vickery	6	6
(Australia) Bond	2	0
8	(United States) Workman	6	6
(Australia) Stevenson	1	3
(Australia) Wilson	9	6
(Australia) Skinner	7	3

Second round
2	(Australia) Wynne	6	6
(Australia) Vickery	4	3
8	(United States) Workman	6	6
(Australia) Wilson	2	1
4	(Australia) Hartigan	7	6
(Australia) Chitty	5	2
7	(Australia) Stevenson	6	4	6
(Australia) Westacott	4	6	3

Quarterfinals
2	(Australia) Wynne	6	6
8	(United States) Workman	4	3
4	(Australia) Hartigan	3	6	1
7	(Australia) Stevenson	6	1	6

Semifinals
2	(Australia) Wynne	3	3
7	(Australia) Stevenson	6	6

Preceded by 1937 U.S. National Championships – Women's singles	Grand Slam women's singles	Succeeded by 1938 French Championships – Women's singles
