= 1938 Australian Championships – Men's singles =

Men's singles
- 1938 Australian Championships

Final
- Champion: (United States) Don Budge
- Runner-up: (Australia) John Bromwich
- Score: 6–4, 6–2, 6–1

Details
- Draw: 33
- Seeds: 8

Events
Singles	men	women		boys	girls
Doubles	men	women	mixed	boys	girls
- Australian Championships

First-seeded Don Budge defeated fourth-seeded John Bromwich 6–4, 6–2, 6–1 in the final to win the men's singles tennis title at the 1938 Australian Championships.

== Seeds ==
The seeded players are listed below. Don Budge is the champion; others show the round in which they were eliminated.

1. (United States) Don Budge (champion)
2. (Germany) Gottfried von Cramm (semifinals)
3. (Germany) Henner Henkel (third round)
4. (Australia) John Bromwich (finalist)
5. (Australia) Adrian Quist (semifinals)
6. (Australia) Vivian McGrath (quarterfinals)
7. (Australia) Jack Crawford (third round)
8. (United States) Gene Mako (quarterfinals)

== Draw ==
Key

- Q = Qualifier
- WC = Wild card
- LL = Lucky loser
- Alt = Alternate
- ITF = ITF entry
- PR = Protected ranking
- SR = Special ranking
- SE = Special exempt
- JE = Junior exempt
- JR = Junior Accelerator Programme entrant
- CO = College Accelerator Programme entrant
- NG = Next Gen Accelerator Program entrant
- w/o = Walkover
- r = Retired
- d = Defaulted

=== Finals ===
Quarterfinals
5	(Australia) Adrian Quist	5	6	6	6
(Australia) George Holland	7	4	1	2
(Australia) Len Schwartz	4	3	8
1	(United States) Don Budge	6	6	10
8	(United States) Gene Mako	4	5	2
4	(Australia) John Bromwich	6	7	6
6	(Australia) Vivian McGrath	2	6	6	5	0
2	(Germany) Gottfried von Cramm	6	3	4	7	6

Semifinals
5	(Australia) Adrian Quist	4	2	6
1	(United States) Don Budge	6	6	8
4	(Australia) John Bromwich	6	7	6
2	(Germany) Gottfried von Cramm	3	5	1

Final
1	(United States) Don Budge	6	6	6
4	(Australia) John Bromwich	4	2	1

=== Earlier rounds ===
==== Section 1 ====
First round

Second round
(Australia) Moon	6	6	6
(Australia) Bennett	4	3	3
(Australia) Bonner	0	1	2
5	(Australia) Quist	6	6	6
(Australia) Holland	5	6	8	6	10
(Australia) Huxley	7	1	10	4	8
(Australia) Pails	5	1	0
3	(Germany) Henkel	7	6	6

Third round
(Australia) Moon	5	6	1
5	(Australia) Quist	7	8	6
(Australia) Holland	1	4	6	6	6
3	(Germany) Henkel	6	6	3	0	4

Quarterfinals
5	(Australia) Quist	5	6	6	6
(Australia) Holland	7	4	1	2

==== Section 2 ====
First round

Second round
(Australia) Callaghan	4	7	2	1
(Australia) Schwartz	6	5	6	6
(Australia) Lovett	4	3	2
7	(Australia) Crawford	6	6	6
(Australia) Weston	3	2	1
(Australia) Whillans	6	6	6
(Australia) Hancock	2	3	4
1	(United States) Budge	6	6	6

Third round
(Australia) Schwartz	7	5	6	8
7	(Australia) Crawford	5	7	3	6
(Australia) Whillans	1	0	1
1	(United States) Budge	6	6	6

Quarterfinals
(Australia) Schwartz	4	3	8
1	(United States) Budge	6	6	10

==== Section 3 ====
First round
(Australia) Warhurst	2	9	7	2
(Australia) Maggs	6	7	9	6

Second round
(Australia) Hopman	6	6	9
(Australia) Harvey	1	1	7
(Australia) Brodie	3	7	4
8	(United States) Mako	6	9	6
(Australia) Harper	w/o
(Australia) Gilchrist
(Australia) Maggs	2	0	0
4	(Australia) Bromwich	6	6	6

Third round
(Australia) Hopman	6	4	5	1
8	(United States) Mako	3	6	7	6
(Australia) Gilchrist	2	2	0
4	(Australia) Bromwich	6	6	6

Quarterfinals
8	(United States) Mako	4	5	2
4	(Australia) Bromwich	6	7	6

==== Section 4 ====
First round

Second round
(Australia) Long	6	6	2	3	2
(Australia) Newcombe	4	1	6	6	6
(Australia) Stephen	8	7	3
6	(Australia) McGrath	10	9	6
(Australia) Sidwell	2	1	4
(Australia) Turnbull	6	6	6
(Australia) Wasley	3	2	1
2	(Germany) von Cramm	6	6	6

Third round
(Australia) Newcombe	4	4	1
6	(Australia) McGrath	6	6	6
(Australia) Turnbull	0	4	6	6
2	(Germany) von Cramm	6	6	4	8

Quarterfinals
6	(Australia) McGrath	2	6	6	5	0
2	(Germany) von Cramm	6	3	4	7	6

Preceded by 1937 U.S. National Championships	Grand Slam men's singles	Succeeded by 1938 French Championships
