= Colorado State Open =

Tournament information
- Founded: 1891
- Location: Colorado, United States; Denver
- Venue: Denver Athletic Club (1891-1906); Denver Country Club (1907-20, 1923-42, 1946-67); Denver City Park (1921-22, 44-45); Colorado Racquet Club (1968-83); Gates Tennis Center (1975-83); Country Club of Colorado(1984); Gates Tennis Center (1985-current)
- Surface: Hard
- Website: https://www.coloradostateopen.com/

The Colorado State Open also known as the Colorado State Championships is a combined men's and women's hard court tennis tournament founded in 1891 as the Rocky Mountain Tennis Championships. The event was organised by the Western Lawn Tennis Association, the first championships was open to contestants from Colorade, New Mexico, Utah, and Wyoming. The first tournament held at the Denver Athletic Club and was played on outdoor clay courts. The current tournament is played on hard courts.

== History ==
In 1891 the Rocky Mountain Tennis Championships were established. The tournament was played on outdoor clay courts at the Denver Athletic Club, Denver, Colorado, United States. In 1907 the tournament was moved to new venue the Denver Country Club and rebranded as the “Colorado State Championships”. Between 1921 and 1922 the championships were moved to Denver City Park. In 1924 a women's event was added to the schedule.

In 1942 the Colorado State Championships moved back to the Denver Country Club until 1945, when it moved back to Denver City Park. In 1946 the championships moved back to Denver Country Club until 1967. The championships were held in other locations, but moved to the new Gates Tennis Center facility consisting of twenty tennis courts in 1975. That year the tournaments name was changed to the Colorado State Open Tennis Championships. In 1988 the tournament was rebranded as the Colorado State Open.
