= George Holland (tennis) =

Australian tennis player (born 1918)

- Full name: George Albert Holland
- Country (sports): Australia
- Born: 11 November 1918 St Kilda, Victoria, Australia
- Died: 30 April 1996 (aged 77) Malvern, Victoria, Australia
- Turned pro: 1936 (amateur tour)
- Retired: 1949

Grand Slam singles results
- Australian Open: QF (1938)

Grand Slam doubles results
- Australian Open: QF (1939)

Grand Slam mixed doubles results
- Australian Open: QF (1939)

George Holland (born 11 November 1918) was an Australian tennis player active during the late 1930s. He reached the quarterfinals of the 1938 Australian Championships after defeating Henner Henkel. During World War II, Holland served in the Australian Army, attaining the rank of lieutenant, before resuming his tennis career after the war.

== Career ==
George Holland made his debut in the Australian championships in 1937 and lost to Arthur Huxley in round one. At the 1938 Australian championships, 19 year old Holland beat Huxley 10–8 in the fifth set in round one. Then in round two Holland caused a big upset by beating reigning French champion and third ranked player in the world Henner Henkel after losing the first 2 sets. From the third set onwards, Holland "followed everything to the net and made some glorious volleys" and was in command of the match. "His groundstrokes had more penetration, he rarely missed his first serve, and he treated Henkel's cannon-balls in cavalier fashion to take command of the attack" according to The Argus. In the quarter-finals, Holland lost in four sets to Adrian Quist. In the first round of the 1939 Australian championships, Holland lost in round one to Vivian McGrath in straight sets. During World War II, Holland reached the rank of Lieutenant. After the war, Holland resumed his tennis career.
