= Dorothy Workman =

American tennis player

- Full name: Dorothy Elizabeth Workman
- Country (sports): United States
- Born: January 5, 1912
- Died: November 30, 1981 (aged 69)

Singles

Grand Slam singles results
- Australian Open: QF (1938)
- US Open: 3R (1930, 1938, 1939)

Doubles

Grand Slam doubles results
- Australian Open: F (1938)
- US Open: SF (1939)

Grand Slam mixed doubles results
- Australian Open: SF (1938)
- US Open: QF (1930, 1938, 1939)

Dorothy Elizabeth "Do" Workman (January 5, 1912 – November 30, 1981) was an American tennis player.

Born in King City, Missouri, Workman competed on tour in the 1930s. She was a member of the Los Angeles Tennis Club and attained a best national ranking of sixth. In 1938 she was a singles quarter-finalist at the Australian Championships and made the final of the women's doubles, with Dorothy Bundy. Her doubles partnership with Bundy, known as "Dodo" and "Do", included multiple Pacific Southwest Championships titles.

== Grand Slam finals ==
=== Women's doubles (1 runner-up) ===
Result	Year	Championship	Surface	Partner	Opponents	Score
Loss	1938	Australian Championships	Grass	(United States) Dorothy Bundy	(Australia) Nancye Wynne (Australia) Thelma Coyne	7–9, 4–6
