= Dorothy Cheney =

American tennis player (1916–2014)

Dorothy Bundy Cheney
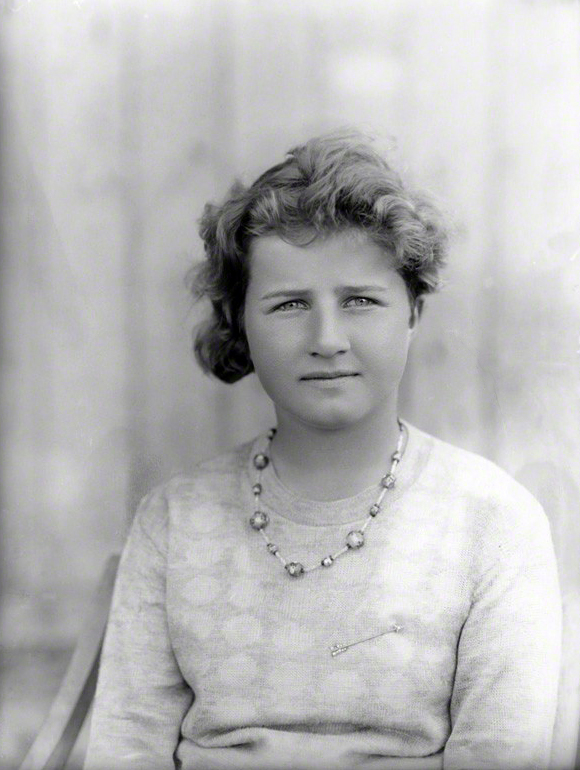
- Bundy in 1929
- Full name: Dorothy May Sutton Bundy Cheney
- Country (sports): United States
- Born: September 1, 1916 Los Angeles, California, U.S.
- Died: November 23, 2014 (aged 98) Escondido, California, U.S.
- Int. Tennis HoF: 2004 (member page)

Singles
- Highest ranking: World No. 6 (1946, John Olliff)

Grand Slam singles results
- Australian Open: W (1938)
- French Open: SF (1946)
- Wimbledon: SF (1946)
- US Open: SF (1937, 1938, 1943, 1944)

Grand Slam doubles results
- Australian Open: F (1938)
- US Open: F (1940, 1941)

Grand Slam mixed doubles results
- French Open: F (1946)
- Wimbledon: F (1946)
- US Open: F (1940, 1944)

Dorothy "Dodo" May Sutton Bundy Cheney (September 1, 1916 – November 23, 2014) was an American tennis player from her youth into her 90s. In 1938, Bundy was the first American to win the women's singles title at the Australian National Championships, defeating Dorothy Stevenson in the final.

== Personal life ==
Cheney was born in Los Angeles, the daughter of Tennis Hall of Famer May Sutton Bundy (1886–1975) and U.S. men's doubles champion Tom Bundy (1881–1945). She was the grandmother of former Major League Baseball player Danny Putnam. Cheney died on November 23, 2014, in Escondido, California at the age of 98.

== Tennis career ==
According to A. Wallis Myers and John Olliff of The Daily Telegraph and the Daily Mail, Bundy Cheney was ranked in the world top 10 in 1937 and 1946 (no rankings issued from 1940 through 1945), reaching a career high of sixth in 1946.

The United States Lawn Tennis Association (USLTA) included Bundy Cheney in its year-end, top-ten rankings of U.S. players from 1936 through 1941, 1943 through 1946, and in 1955. She was ranked third in 1937, 1938, and 1941.

Bundy was a member of the victorious U.S. Wightman Cup teams from 1937 through 1939.

She was inducted into the International Tennis Hall of Fame in 2004.

Cheney was still competing in selected top level events at the age of 51. In 1967, she defeated a seeded player, Karen Krantzcke, in the third round of the Pacific Southwest Championships in straight sets.

By the end of her senior age-groups playing career, Cheney had amassed 394 USTA titles — a record.

=== Grand Slam and other singles tournaments ===
In the first singles match of her career at any Grand Slam tournament, Bundy upset second-seeded Sarah Palfrey Fabyan in the first round of the 1936 U.S. National Championships. Bundy ultimately lost in the quarterfinals.

The first nine times that Bundy Cheney played singles at the U.S. National Championships, she reached at least the quarterfinals. During those (and other) years, she had no "bad" losses at Grand Slam singles tournaments. Her losses were as follows

Bundy Cheney also had several significant singles wins at Grand Slam tournaments:

Year	Tournament	Round	Opponent	Opponent's Seeding
1936	U.S. National Championships	1R	Sarah Palfrey Fabyan	Second
1937	U.S. National Championships	3R	Marie Horn	Fourth foreign
1937	U.S. National Championships	QF	Alice Marble	First
1938	U.S. National Championships	2R	Margaret Osborne	None
1938	U.S. National Championships	QF	Simone Mathieu	Second foreign
1939	U.S. National Championships	3R	Freda James	Fifth foreign
1941	U.S. National Championships	3R	Patricia Canning Todd	None
1943	U.S. National Championships	QF	Margaret Osborne	Third
1944	U.S. National Championships	2R	Patricia Canning Todd	None
1944	U.S. National Championships	QF	Doris Hart	Second
1946	Wimbledon Championships	4R	Betty Nuthall	None
1946	Wimbledon Championships	QF	Katherine Stammers	None

Cheney won the singles title at the 1944 Tri-Cities Championships in Cincinnati, defeating Betz in the final. The following year, Cheney was the singles runner-up at that tournament.

=== Grand Slam and other women's doubles tournaments ===
Bundy Cheney was a three-time runner-up in Grand Slam women's doubles tournaments: 1938 Australian National Championships, 1940 U.S. National Championships, and 1941 U.S. National Championships.

Cheney won the women's doubles title at the 1944 and 1945 Tri-Cities Championships in Cincinnati.

== Grand Slam finals ==
=== Singles (1 title) ===
Result	Year	Championship	Surface	Opponent	Score
Win	1938	Australian Championships	Grass	(Australia) Dorothy Stevenson	6–3, 6–2

=== Doubles (3 runner-ups) ===
Result	Year	Championship	Surface	Partner	Opponents	Score
Loss	1938	Australian Championships	Grass	(United States) Dorothy Workman	(Australia) Nancye Wynne Bolton (Australia) Thelma Coyne Long	7–9, 4–6
Loss	1940	U.S. National Championships	Grass	(United States) Marjorie Gladman Van Ryn	(United States) Alice Marble (United States) Sarah Palfrey Cooke	3–6, 7–9
Loss	1941	U.S. National Championships	Grass	(United States) Pauline Betz	(United States) Margaret Osborne duPont (United States) Sarah Palfrey Cooke	6–3, 1–6, 4–6

=== Mixed doubles (4 runner-ups) ===
Result	Year	Championship	Surface	Partner	Opponents	Score
Loss	1940	U.S. National Championships	Grass	(United States) Jack Kramer	(United States) Alice Marble (United States) Bobby Riggs	7–9, 1–6
Loss	1944	U.S. National Championships	Grass	(United States) Don McNeill	(United States) Margaret Osborne duPont (United States) Bill Talbert	2–6, 3–6
Loss	1946	Wimbledon	Grass	(Australia) Geoff Brown	(United States) Louise Brough (United States) Thomas Brown, Jr.	4–6, 4–6
Loss	1946	French Championships	Clay	(United States) Thomas Brown, Jr	(United States) Pauline Betz (United States) Budge Patty	5–7, 7–9

== Other singles finals (54 titles, 60 runner-ups) ==
Result	Week of	Tournament	Surface	Opponent	Score
Lost	Jul 24, 1933	British Columbia Open Championships; Victoria Lawn Tennis Club; Victoria, British Columbia, Canada	Grass	Mary Campbell	0–6, 6–2, 4–6
Won	Sep 4, 1933	Santa Monica City Open; Santa Monica, California, U. S.	Hard	May Doeg Smith	8–6, 6–3
Won	Aug 13, 1934	Long Beach Open Championships; Long Beach, California, U. S.	Hard	Marjorie Lauderbach Blair	10–8, 6–2
Won	Apr 13, 1936	Ambassador Hotel Invitational; Ambassador Tennis Club; Los Angeles, California, U. S.	Hard	Esther Hare Bartosh	6–3, 6–2
Won	Apr 20, 1936	Ojai Valley Tennis Tournament; Ojai Valley Tennis Club; Ojai, California, U. S.	Hard	Gracyn Wheeler Kelleher	7–5, 1–6, 6–4
Lost	May 4, 1936	Southern California Sectional Championships; Los Angeles Tennis Club; Los Angeles, U. S.	Hard	Alice Marble	2–6, 4–6
Won	Jun 15, 1936	City of Denver Championships; Denver Country Club; Denver, Colorado, U. S.	Clay	Fay Schwayder	6–1, 6–1
Won	Jul 6, 1936	Colorado State Championships; Denver Country Club; Denver, Colorado, U. S.	Clay	Gertrude Bishop Bixler	6–1, 6–4
Won	Dec 28, 1936	Southern California Midwinter Championships; La Cienega Tennis Club; Beverley Hills, California, U. S.	Hard	Jacque Virgil Nelson	6–1, 3–6, 6–1
Won	Apr 5, 1937	Ambassador Hotel Invitational; Ambassador Tennis Club; Los Angeles, California, U. S.	Hard	Barbara Winslow	6–4, 8–6
Won	Apr 19, 1937	Ojai Valley Tennis Tournament; Ojai Valley Tennis Club; Ojai, California, U. S.	Hard	Barbara Winslow	6–2, 6–2
Won	May 3, 1937	Southern California Sectional Championships; Los Angeles Tennis Club; Los Angeles, U.S.	Hard	Gracyn Wheeler Kelleher	6–1, 6–8, 7–5
Lost	Jun 28, 1937	Hotel del Coronado Invitational; Coronado, California, U. S.	Hard	Bonnie Miller Blank	5–7, 4–6
Won	Jul 12, 1937	Colorado State Championships; Denver Country Club; Denver, Colorado, U. S.	Clay	Carolin Babcock	4–6, 6–0, 6–3
Won	Dec 6, 1937	Victorian Championships; Kooyong Lawn Tennis Club; Melbourne, Australia	Grass	Nancye Wynne Bolton	6–4, 1–6, 6–4
Won	Apr 18, 1938	Ambassador Hotel Invitational; Ambassador Tennis Club; Los Angeles, California, U. S.	Hard	May Doeg Smith	8–6, 3–6, 6–2
Won	Apr 25, 1938	Ojai Valley Tennis Tournament; Ojai Valley Tennis Club; Ojai, California, U. S.	Hard	Gertrude Bishop Bixler	6–3, 6–3
Lost	May 23, 1938	Middlesex Championships; Chiswick Park Lawn Tennis Club; London, United Kingdom	Grass	Jadwiga Jędrzejowska	5–7, 2–6
Lost	Jul 11, 1938	Scottish Championships; Peebles, Scotland	Grass	Mary Hardwick	2–6, 5–7
Lost	Jul 25, 1938	Seabright Invitational; Seabright Lawn Tennis and Cricket Club; Rumson, New Jersey, U. S.	Grass	Alice Marble	2–6, 2–6
Lost	Aug 8, 1938	Eastern Grass Court Championships; Westchester Country Club; Rye, New York, U. S.	Grass	Alice Marble	5–7, 0–6
Won	Sep 26, 1938	Pacific Southwest Championships; Los Angeles Tennis Club; Los Angeles, U. S.	Hard	Sarah Palfrey Cooke	6–4, 6–4
Won	Jan 9, 1939	Palm Springs Invitational; Palm Springs Tennis Club; Palm Springs, California, U. S.	Hard	Mary Arnold Prentiss	6–4, 6–2
Won	Jun 26, 1939	Colorado State Championships; Denver Country Club; Denver, Colorado, U. S.	Clay	Marjorie Gladman Van Ryn	6–3, 4–6, 6–4
Lost	Sep 25, 1939	Pacific Southwest Championships; Los Angeles Tennis Club; Los Angeles, California, U. S.	Hard	Alice Marble	7–9, 1–6
Lost	Jan 8, 1940	Palm Springs Invitational; El Mirador Tennis Club; Palm Springs, California, U. S.	Hard	Helen Bernhard	3–6, 4–6
Won	Apr 15, 1940	Beverley Hills Invitational; La Cienega Tennis Club; Beverley Hills, California, U. S.	Hard	Helen Bernhard	6–2, 7–5
Won	Apr 22, 1940	Ojai Valley Tennis Tournament; Ojai Valley Tennis Club; Ojai, California, U. S.	Hard	Pauline Betz	6–4, 6–4
Won	Jun 24, 1940	Hotel del Coronado Invitational; Coronado, California, U. S.	Hard	Louise Brough	3–6, 6–1, 6–4
Won	Jul 8, 1940	Colorado State Championships; Denver Country Club; Denver, Colorado, U. S.	Clay	Esther Hare Bartosh	7–5, 6–4
Lost	Jul 15, 1940	Eastern Clay Court Championships; Jackson Heights Tennis Club; New York City, New York, U. S.	Clay	Virginia Wolfenden	6–4, 4–6, 3–6
Won	Jul 29, 1940	Maidstone Invitational; Maidstone Club; East Hampton, New York, U. S.	Grass	Gracyn Wheeler Kelleher	6–2, 6–3
Won	Sep 16, 1940	Pacific Southwest Championships; Los Angeles Tennis Club; Los Angeles, California, U. S.	Hard	Valerie Scott	6–3, 6–3
Won	Nov 11, 1940	Championships of the Argentine; Buenos Aires, Argentina	Clay	Sarah Palfrey Cooke	6–1, 4–6, 6–3
Won	Nov 25, 1940	International Tournament of Uruguay; Montevideo, Uruguay	Clay	Sarah Palfrey Cooke	6–4, 7–9, 6–3
Lost	Dec 2, 1940	Rio de Janeiro, Brazil	Clay	Sarah Palfrey Cooke	8–6, 3–6, 3–6
Lost	Dec 9, 1940	Championship of the Fluminense; Rio de Janeiro, Brazil	Clay	Sarah Palfrey Cooke	2–6, 1–6
Lost	Jan 20, 1941	Florida West Coast Championships; St. Petersburg, Florida, U. S.	Clay	Sarah Palfrey Cooke	5–7, 1–6
Lost	Feb 3, 1941	South Florida Championships; West Palm Beach, Florida, U. S.	Clay	Pauline Betz	4–6, 1–6
Lost	Feb 17, 1941	Miami Biltmore Round Robin; Miami Biltmore Country Club; Coral Gables, Florida, U. S.	Clay	Pauline Betz	3–6
Lost	Feb 24, 1941	Southeastern Sectional Championships; Jacksonville, Florida, U. S.	Clay	Pauline Betz	4–6, 9–11
Lost	Mar 24, 1941	U.S. National Indoor Championships; Longwood Cricket Club; Brookline, Massachusetts, U. S.	Indoor wood	Pauline Betz	1–6, 12–10, 2–6
Won	Apr 14, 1941	River Oaks Invitational; River Oaks Country Club; Houston, Texas, U. S.	Clay	Pauline Betz	5–7, 6–4, 11–9
Won	Jun 2, 1941	Heart of America Championships; Rockhill Club; Kansas City, Missouri, U. S.	Clay	Pauline Betz	6–2, 2–6, 6–3
Lost	Jun 23, 1941	Hotel del Coronado Invitational; Coronado, California, U. S.	Hard	Louise Brough	2–6, 11–9, 2–6
Lost	Jun 30, 1941	Colorado State Championships; Denver Country Club; Denver, Colorado, U. S.	Clay	Nina Browm	6–8, 5–7
Lost	Jul 7, 1941	Western Sectional Championships; Woodstock Country Club; Indianapolis, Indiana, U. S.	Clay	Pauline Betz	7–9, 6–4, 3–6
Lost	Sep 15, 1941	Pacific Southwest Championships; Los Angeles, U. S.	Hard	Sarah Palfrey Cooke	3–6, 5–7
Lost	Nov 17, 1941	Championships of the Argentine; Buenos Aires, Argentina	Clay	Sarah Palfrey Cooke	6–3, 7–9, 5–7
Lost	Feb 9, 1942	Florida State Championships; Orlando, Florida, U. S.	Clay	Pauline Betz	1–6, 4–6
Won	Jun 29, 1942	Colorado State Championships; Denver Country Club; Denver, Colorado, U. S.	Clay	Pearl Harland	
Won	Aug 31, 1942	Santa Monica City Open; Santa Monica, California, U. S.	Hard	Gracyn Wheeler Kelleher	6–3, 6–3
Won	Jan 25, 1943	La Jolla Beach and Tennis Club Invitational; La Jolla, California, U. S.	Hard	Gracyn Wheeler Kelleher	6–4, 6–1
Lost	May 31, 1943	Southern California Sectional Championships; Los Angeles Tennis Club; Los Angeles, U. S.	Hard	Louise Brough	3–6, 2–6
Lost	Oct 11, 1943	Pan American International Championships; Mexico City, Mexico	Clay	Pauline Betz	5–7, 4–6
Won	Jun 12, 1944	U.S. National Clay Court Championships; Detroit Tennis Club; Detroit, Michigan, U. S.	Clay	Mary Arnold Prentiss	7–5, 6–4
Won	Jun 19, 1944	Tri-State Championships; Cincinnati Tennis Club; Cincinnati, Ohio, U. S.	Clay	Pauline Betz	7–5, 6–4
Lost	Jul 3, 1944	Western Sectional Championships; Neenah, Wisconsin, U. S.	Clay	Pauline Betz	1–6, 2–6
Lost	Jul 10, 1944	Chicago Open; River Forest Tennis Club; River Forest, Illinois, U. S.	Clay	Mary Arnold Prentiss	7–9, 4–6
Lost	Aug 16, 1944	Longwood Bowl Invitational; Longwood Cricket Club; Brookline, Massachusetts, U. S.	Grass	Louise Brough	2–6, 4–6
Lost	Jun 25, 1945	Tri-State Championships; Cincinnati Tennis Club; Cincinnati, Ohio, U. S.	Clay	Pauline Betz	2–6, 0–6
Lost	Aug 20, 1945	Maidstone Invitational; Maidstone Club; East Hampton, New York, U. S.	Grass	Sarah Palfrey Cooke	6–8, 4–6
Lost	Jan 7, 1946	La Jolla Beach and Tennis Club Invitational; La Jolla, California, U. S.	Hard	Pauline Betz	9–7, 3–6, 3-6
Lost	Mar 18, 1946	Town House Invitational; Los Angeles, California, U. S.	Hard	Pauline Betz	4–6, 1-6
Lost	Apr 8, 1946	Beverly Hills Invitational; La Cienega Tennis Club; Beverly Hills, California, U. S.	Hard	Pauline Betz	3–6, 1-6
Won	May 6, 1946	Southern California Sectional Championships; Los Angeles Tennis Club; Los Angeles, U. S.	Hard	Pauline Betz	6–1, 3–6, 6-1
Won	May 20, 1946	California State Championships; California Club; Berkeley, California, U. S.	Hard	Dorothy Head Knode	6–4, 7-5
Won	Jul 29, 1946	Prague International Championships; Prague, Czechoslovakia	Clay	_____ Solcova	6–2, 6–1
Won	Aug 5, 1946	Gstaad International Championships; Gstaad, Switzerland	Clay	Helena Straubeová	6–4, 6–1
Won	Aug 12, 1946	International Swiss Championships; Lucerne, Switzerland	Clay	Shared with Nelly Adamson Landry	
Lost	Sep 23, 1946	Pacific Southwest Championships; Los Angeles Tennis Club; Los Angeles, California, U. S.	Hard	Pauline Betz	2–6, 2–6
Lost	Feb 3, 1947	La Jolla Beach and Tennis Club Invitational; La Jolla, California, U. S.	Hard	Pauline Betz	4–6, 3-6
Won	Mar 13, 1950	La Jolla Beach and Tennis Club Spring Invitational; La Jolla, California, U. S.	Hard	Gracyn Wheeler Kelleher	6–1, 6-2
Lost	Apr 24, 1950	Ojai Valley Tennis Tournament; Ojai Valley Tennis Club; Ojai, California, U. S.	Hard	Helen Pastall Perez	6–4, 4–6, 3–6
Lost	Sep 11, 1950	Pacific Southwest Championships; Los Angeles Tennis Club; Los Angeles, California, U. S.	Hard	Helen Pastall Perez	2–6, 2–6
Won	Jun 16, 1952	Hotel del Coronado Invitational; Coronado, California, U. S.	Hard	Gracyn Wheeler Kelleher	6–3, 6–4
Lost	Aug 18, 1952	Santa Monica City Open; Santa Monica, California, U. S.	Hard	Beverly Baker Fleitz	2–6, 3–6
Lost	Feb 2, 1953	Thunderbird Invitational; Phoenix, Arizona, U. S.	Hard	Anita Kanter	6–3, 4–6, 3–6
Lost	Feb 9, 1953	Palm Springs Winter Invitational; Palm Springs, California, U. S.	Hard	Helen Pastall Perez	6–3, 9–11, 4–6
Won	Apr 20, 1953	Ojai Valley Tennis Tournament; Ojai Valley Tennis Club; Ojai, California, U. S.	Hard	Darlene Hard	6–3, 6–2
Lost	May 4, 1953	Southern California Sectional Championships; Los Angeles Tennis Club; Los Angeles, U. S.	Hard	Helen Pastall Perez	2–6, 4–6
Lost	Jun 22, 1953	Hotel del Coronado Invitational; Coronado, California, U. S.	Hard	Beverly Baker Fleitz	6–4, 6–8, 1–6
Lost	Jul 27, 1953	Balboa Bay Club Invitational, Newport Beach, California, U. S.	Hard	Beverly Baker Fleitz	4–6, 5–7
Lost	Aug 24, 1953	Santa Monica City Tournament; Santa Monica, California, U. S.	Hard	Beverly Baker Fleitz	3–6, 4–6
Lost	Feb 8, 1954	Palm Springs Winter Invitational; Palm Springs, California, U. S.	Hard	Helen Pastall Perez	9–7, 2–6, retired
Lost	Apr 22, 1954	Ojai Valley Tennis Tournament; Ojai Valley Tennis Club; Ojai, California, U. S.	Hard	Mary Arnold Prentiss	6–1, 4–6, 2–6
Won	Jul 19, 1954	Colorado State Championships; Denver, Colorado, U. S.		Julia Sampson Hayward	6–3, 6–4
Won	Jul 26, 1954	Balboa Bay Club Invitational, Newport Beach, California, U. S.	Hard	Barbara Green Weigandt	2–6, 6–4, 6–2
Won	Apr 18, 1955	Ojai Valley Tennis Tournament; Ojai, California, U. S.	Hard	Barbara Breit	6–4, 9–7
Lost	Apr 30, 1956	Ojai Valley Tennis Tournament; Ojai, California, U. S.	Hard	Beverly Baker Fleitz	5–7, 2–6
Won	Feb 4, 1957	Palm Desert Invitational; Shadow Mountain Club; Palm Desert, California, U. S.	Hard	Patricia Canning Todd	4–6, 6–1, 6–4
Lost	May 13, 1957	San Bernardino Open; Perris Hill Park; San Bernardino, California, U. S.	Hard	Joan Johnson	2-6, retired
Won	Jul 1, 1957	La Jolla Beach and Tennis Club Summer Invitational; La Jolla, California, U. S.	Hard	Marilyn Joseph	6–3, 6-2
Won	Aug 12, 1957	Beverly Hills Invitational; La Cienega Tennis Club; Beverly Hills, California, U. S.	Hard	Barbara Green Weigandt	6–3, 6-0
Won	Aug 26, 1957	Santa Monica City Tournament; Santa Monica, California, U. S.	Hard	Beverly Baker Fleitz	6–3, 0–6, 6–4
Lost	Oct 21, 1957	Riverside Tennis Club Invitational; Riverside, California, U. S.	Hard	Darlene Hard	6–3, 8–10, 4–6
Lost	Oct 21, 1957	Balboa Bay Club Invitational; Newport Beach, California, U. S.	Hard	Beverly Baker Fleitz	4–6, 1–6
Won	Jul 10, 1958	La Jolla Beach and Tennis Club Summer Invitational; La Jolla, California, U. S.	Hard	Mary Arnold Prentiss	6–4, 6-2
Lost	Sep 29, 1958	Riverside Press-Enterprise Invitational; Riverside Tennis Club; Riverside, California, U. S.	Hard	Karen Hantze Susman	2–6, 1–6
Lost	Jul 9, 1959	La Jolla Beach and Tennis Club Summer Invitational; La Jolla, California, U. S.	Hard	Karen Hantze Susman	2–6, 7-9
Lost	Feb 8, 1960	Palm Desert Invitational; Shadow Mountain Club; Palm Desert, California, U. S.	Hard	Carole Caldwell Graebner	6–1, 3–6, 4–6
Lost	Apr 18, 1960	Ojai Valley Tennis Tournament; Ojai, California, U. S.	Hard	Karen Hantze Susman	0–6, 0–6
Won	1960	La Jolla Beach and Tennis Club Summer Invitational; La Jolla, California, U. S.	Hard	Judy Minna	6–1, 6-3
Won	Jul 3, 1961	La Jolla Beach and Tennis Club Summer Invitational; La Jolla, California, U. S.	Hard	Kathy Blake Bryan	6–1, 6-4
Lost	Apr 23, 1962	Ojai Valley Tennis Tournament; Ojai, California, U. S.	Hard	Carole Caldwell Graebner	7–5, 2–6, 5–7
Won	Jul 2, 1962	La Jolla Beach and Tennis Club Summer Invitational; La Jolla, California, U. S.	Hard	Patricia Cody	6–2, 6-3
Won	Jul 1, 1963	La Jolla Beach and Tennis Club Summer Invitational; La Jolla, California, U. S.	Hard	Kathy Chabot	6–2, 1–6, 6-1
Lost	1964	Palm Desert Invitational; Shadow Mountain Club; Palm Desert, California, U. S.	Hard	Karen Hantze Susman	5–7, 4–6
Won	Jul 9, 1964	La Jolla Beach and Tennis Club Summer Invitational; La Jolla, California, U. S.	Hard	Patricia Hogan Fordyce	7–5, 6-1
Lost	Jul 5, 1965	La Jolla Beach and Tennis Club Summer Invitational; La Jolla, California, U. S.	Hard	Patricia Hogan Fordyce	2–6, 4-6
Lost	Jul 4, 1966	La Jolla Beach and Tennis Club Summer Invitational; La Jolla, California, U. S.	Hard	Patricia Hogan Fordyce	7–5, 3–6, 4-6
Lost	May 8, 1967	Southern California Sectional Championships; Los Angeles Tennis Club; Los Angeles, U. S.	Hard	Tory Fretz	7–9, retired
Won	Aug 4, 1969	British Columbia Open Championships; Victoria, British Columbia, Canada		Mary Struthers	6-4, 8-6
Lost	Aug 4, 1969	British Columbia Open Championships; Victoria, British Columbia, Canada		Cynthia Marquette	2-6, 4-6

== Grand Slam singles tournament timeline ==
Key
W	F	SF	QF	#R	RR	Q#	DNQ	A	NH

(W) winner; (F) finalist; (SF) semifinalist; (QF) quarterfinalist; (#R) rounds 4, 3, 2, 1; (RR) round-robin stage; (Q#) qualification round; (DNQ) did not qualify; (A) absent; (NH) not held; (SR) strike rate (events won / competed); (W–L) win–loss record.

Tournament	1936	1937	1938	1939	1940	1941	1942	1943	1944	1945	1946^{1}	1947^{1}	1948	1949 - 1954	1955	1956 - 1958	1959	Career SR
Australian Championships	A	A	W	A	A	NH	NH	NH	NH	NH	A	A	A	A	A	A	A	1 / 1
French Championships	A	A	A	A	NH	R	R	R	R	A	SF	A	A	A	A	A	A	0 / 1
Wimbledon Championships	A	A	4R	A	NH	NH	NH	NH	NH	NH	SF	A	A	A	A	A	A	0 / 2
U.S. National Championships	QF	SF	SF	QF	QF	QF	A	SF	SF	QF	1R	A	2R	A	3R	A	1R	0 / 13
SR	0 / 1	0 / 1	1 / 3	0 / 1	0 / 1	0 / 1	0 / 0	0 / 1	0 / 1	0 / 1	0 / 3	0 / 0	0 / 1	0 / 0	0 / 1	0 / 0	0 / 1	1 / 17

R = tournament restricted to French nationals and held under German occupation.

^{1}In 1946 and 1947, the French International Championships were held after the Wimbledon Championships.

== See also ==
- Performance timelines for all female tennis players since 1978 who reached at least one Grand Slam final
